= 2020–21 Akwa United F.C. season =

25th season in existence of Akwa United

Akwa United
2020–21 season
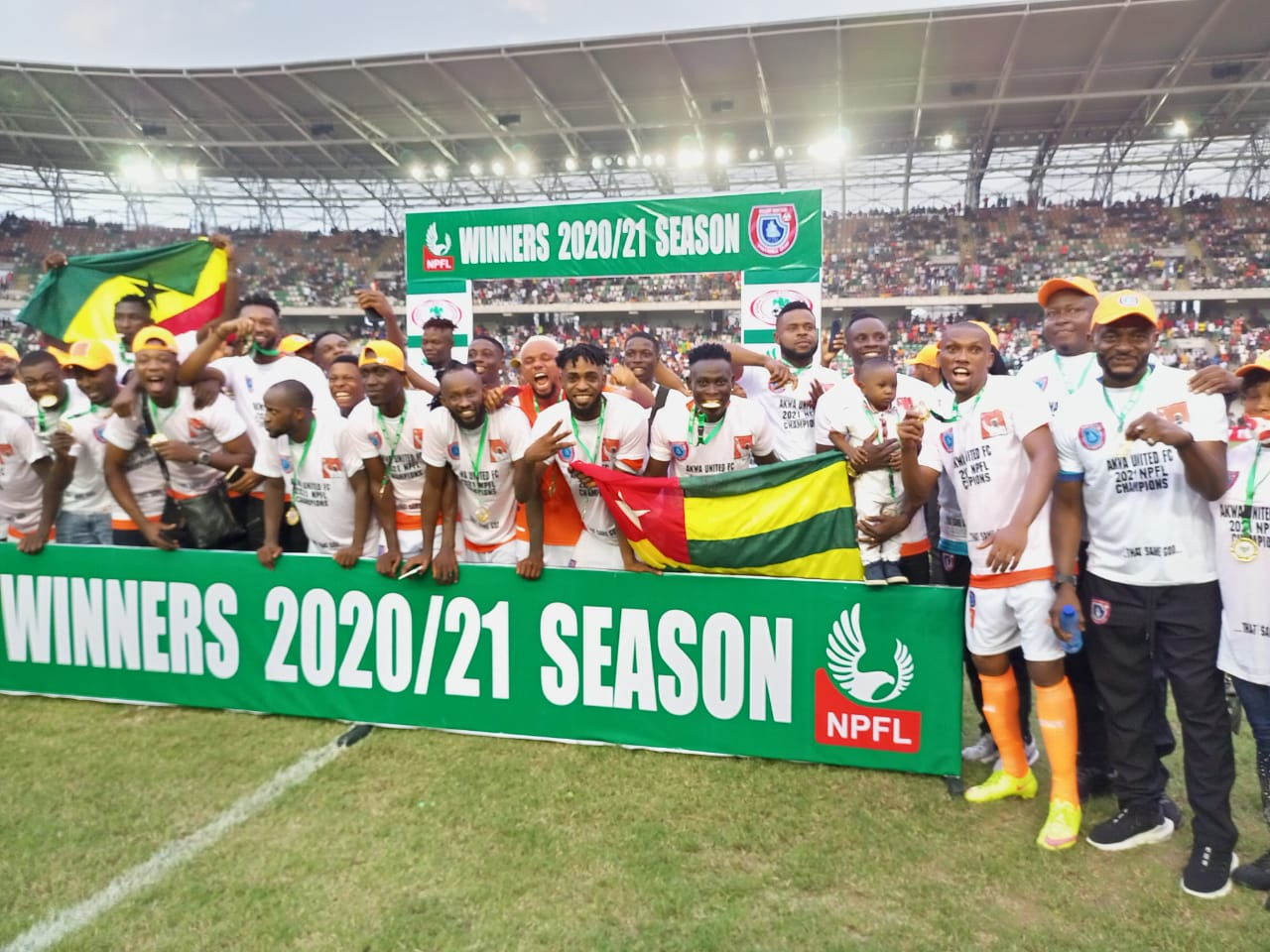
- Akwa United lifting the Nigeria Professional Football League trophy
- Chairman: Paul Bassey
- Manager: Kennedy Boboye
- Nigeria Professional Football League: 1st
- Nigeria FA Cup: First round
- Top goalscorer: League: Charles Atshimene (19); All: Charles Atshimene (19)
- Biggest win: 5-2 v MFM; 1 August 2021
Home colours	Away colours

The 2020–21 season was Akwa United's 25th season in the Nigerian football league system and their 12th (non-consecutive) season in the top tier of Nigerian football.

During the season, Akwa United participated in the Nigeria Professional Football League for the ninth consecutive season and the Nigeria FA Cup.

They began their Nigeria Professional Football League campaign with a home tie against city rivals Dakkada, which ended goalless. On 1 August 2021, they beat MFM 5-2 at Godswill Akpabio Stadium to seal the league title. It was their first-ever top-flight triumph. They suffered an early exit from the Aiteo Cup, losing 1-0 to Gateway United in the First Round.

== Kit and sponsorship ==
Supplier: Owu Sportswear

Home	2020-21 Away	2020-21 Third	2021-22 Home

== Competitions ==
Win Draw Loss

=== Overview ===
Competition	First match	Last match	Starting round	Final position	Record							
Competition	First match	Last match	Starting round	Final position	Pld	W	D	L	GF	GA	GD	Win %
Nigeria Professional Football League	28 December 2020	5 August 2021	Matchday 1	Winners	38	19	14	5	53	24	+29	50.00
FA Cup	7 July 2021	7 July 2021	First round	First round	1	0	0	1	0	1	−1	0.00
Total					39	19	14	6	53	25	+28	48.72

Source: Soccerway

=== Nigeria Professional Football League ===
==== League table ====
Pos	Team	Pld	W	D	L	GF	GA	GD	Pts	
1	Akwa United (C)	38	19	14	5	53	24	+29	71	Qualification for the Champions League
2	Rivers United	38	19	9	10	50	34	+16	66	Qualification for the Champions League
3	Enyimba	38	18	12	8	41	33	+8	66	Qualification for the Confederation Cup
4	Kwara United	38	19	8	11	48	28	+20	65	
5	Nasarawa United	38	20	5	13	55	38	+17	65	
6	Kano Pillars	38	19	7	12	38	29	+9	64	
7	Enugu Rangers	38	18	8	12	43	31	+12	62	
8	Lobi Stars	38	17	7	14	43	39	+4	58	
9	Plateau United	38	14	9	15	45	35	+10	51	
10	MFM	38	13	12	13	34	35	−1	51	
11	Dakkada	38	15	5	18	37	47	−10	50	
12	Katsina United	38	14	7	17	35	42	−7	49	
13	Heartland	38	13	9	16	43	50	−7	48	
14	Abia Warriors	38	12	11	15	48	42	+6	47	
15	Wikki Tourists	38	12	9	17	40	47	−7	45	
16	Sunshine Stars	38	11	12	15	28	39	−11	45	
17	Warri Wolves	38	11	8	19	30	45	−15	41	Relegation to the National League
18	Jigawa Golden Stars	38	10	10	18	27	48	−21	40	Relegation to the National League
19	Ifeanyiubah	38	9	12	17	33	50	−17	39	Relegation to the National League
20	Adamawa United	38	5	10	23	20	55	−35	25	Relegation to the National League

Source: NPFL
Rules for classification: 1) points; 2) goal difference; 3) number of goals scored
(C) Champions

==== Results summary ====
Overall								Home						Away					
Pld	W	D	L	GF	GA	GD	Pts	W	D	L	GF	GA	GD	W	D	L	GF	GA	GD
38	19	14	5	53	24	+29	71	16	3	0	38	8	+30	3	11	5	15	16	−1

Last updated: 26 October 2021.
Source: Soccerstats

==== Matches ====
On 9 November 2020, the fixtures for the forthcoming season were announced.

28 December 2020 1	Akwa United	0-0	Dakkada FC	Uyo
15:00 BST		Report		Stadium: Godswill Akpabio Stadium

3 January 2021 2	Enugu Rangers	1-0	Akwa United	Enugu
15:00 BST	Israel Abia 60'	Report		Stadium: The Cathedral

9 January 2021 3	Akwa United	2–1	Abia Warriors	Uyo
15:00 BST	Effiong 6' (59), pen.'	Report	Ibukun Harrison 81'	Stadium: Godswill Akpabio Stadium

13 January 2021 4	Kwara United	1–1	Akwa United	Ilorin
15:00 BST	Chinedu Nwanze 61' (pen.)	Report	Chinedu Nwanze 68' (o.g.)	Stadium: Kwara Stadium

18 January 2021 5	Akwa United	1-1	Wikki Tourists	Uyo
16:00 BST	Effiong 25'	Report	Sunday 40'	Stadium: Godswill Akpabio Stadium

24 January 2021 6	Heartland	2–1	Akwa United	Owerri
15:00 BST	Nnoshiri 52'; Pascal Eze 79'	Report	Udoh 34'	Stadium: Dan Anyiam Stadium

30 January 2021 7	Akwa United	1–0	Kano Pillars	Uyo
15:00 BST	Effiong 29'	Report		Stadium: Godswill Akpabio Stadium

3 February 2021 8	Adamawa United	0–1	Akwa United	Gombe
15:00 BST	Jibril Abubakar (red card)	Report	Udoh 58'	Stadium: Pantami Stadium

7 February 2021 9	Akwa United	3–0	Katsina United	Uyo
15:00 BST	Effiong 29' (76), pen.' Charles Atshimene 61'	Report		Stadium: Godswill Akpabio Stadium

14 February 2021 10	Nasarawa United	2–1	Akwa United	Lafia
15:00 BST	Hassan Adamu 56'; Chukwuebuka Anaekwe 90'	Report	Effiong 63'	Stadium: Lafia Township Stadium

20 February 2021 11	Akwa United	1–0	Plateau United	Uyo
15:00 GMT	Charles Atshimene 53'; Etboy Akpan (red card)	Report		Stadium: Godswill Akpabio Stadium

24 February 2021 12	Enyimba	1–1	Akwa United	Aba
15:00 GMT	Oladapo 54'	Report	David Philip 90+4'	Stadium: Enyimba International Stadium

28 February 2021 13	Akwa United	3–0	Rivers United	Uyo
15:00 GMT	Udoh 38'; Charles Atshimene 51'; Chukwu 89'	Report		Stadium: Godswill Akpabio Stadium

8 March 2021 14	Warri Wolves	0–0	Akwa United	Ozoro
15:00 GMT		Report		Stadium: Delta State Polytechnic Stadium

11 April 2021 15	Jigawa Stars	1–1	Akwa United	Kaduna
15:00 GMT	Samuel Stone 90' (pen.)	Report	Nasiru Jibril 89'	Stadium: Ahmadu Bello Stadium

17 March 2021 16	Akwa United	1–0	FC Ifeanyi Ubah	Uyo
15:00 GMT	Effiong 17' (pen.); Wilson Elu (red card)	Report		Stadium: Godswill Akpabio Stadium

21 March 2021 17	MFM	1–2	Akwa United	Lagos
15:00 GMT	Paul Obata 45'	Report	Udoh 27'; Ikechukwu Nwani 53'	Stadium: Soccer Temple

28 March 2021 18	Akwa United	3–0	Lobi Stars
15:00 GMT	Ikechukwu Nwani 16'; Udoh 23' (45+2)	Report	Mustapha Aliko (red card)

3 April 2021 19	Sunshine Stars	0–0	Akwa United	Lagos
15:00 GMT		Report		Stadium: Soccer Temple

9 May 2021 20	Akwa United	2–1	Sunshine Stars	Uyo
15:00 GMT	Charles Atshimene 21'; Seth Mayi 71'	Report	Sadeeq Yusuf 35'	Stadium: Godswill Akpabio Stadium

16 May 2021 21	Dakkada	0–2	Akwa United	Uyo
15:00 GMT		Report	Charles Atshimene 11' (48)	Stadium: Godswill Akpabio Stadium

24 May 2021 22	Akwa United	0–0	Enugu Rangers	Uyo
15:00 GMT		Report	Issif (red card)	Stadium: Godswill Akpabio Stadium

27 May 2021 23	Abia Warriors	0–0	Akwa United	Okigwe
15:00 GMT		Report	Charles Atshimene (red card)	Stadium: Okigwe Stadium

30 May 2021 24	Akwa United	2–1	Kwara United	Uyo
19:45 GMT	Friday 38'; Nasiru Jibril 69'	Report	Wasiu Alalade 80'	Stadium: Godswill Akpabio Stadium

6 June 2021 25	Wikki Tourists	2–2	Akwa United	Bauchi
15:00 GMT	Michael Stephen Gopey 33' (70)	Report	Saidu Salisu 37'; Charles Atshimene 53'	Stadium: Abubakar Tafawa Balewa Stadium

10 June 2021 26	Akwa United	3–1	Heartland	Uyo
12:00 GMT	Charles Atshimene 2' (24); Friday 73'	Report	Chijioke Akuneto 45' (pen.)	Stadium: Godswill Akpabio Stadium

14 June 2021 27	Kano Pillars	0–0	Akwa United	Kano
15:00 GMT				Stadium: Sani Abacha Stadium

19 June 2021 28	Akwa United	2–0	Adamawa United	Uyo
15:00 GMT	Udoh 25'; Charles Atshimene 45'	Report		Stadium: Godswill Akpabio Stadium

27 June 2021 29	Katsina United	1–0	Akwa United	Katsina
15:00 GMT	Samuel Kalu 16' (pen.)	Report		Stadium: Muhammadu Dikko Stadium

1 July 2021 30	Akwa United	2–1	Nasarawa United	Uyo
15:00 GMT	Samuel Amadi 36'; Johnson 45+1'	Report	Hassan Adamu 77' (pen.)	Stadium: Godswill Akpabio Stadium

4 July 20211 31	Plateau United	0–0	Akwa United	Jos
15:00 GMT		Report		Stadium: Jos International Stadium

11 July 2021 32	Akwa United	1–0	Enyimba	Uyo
15:00 BST	Charles Atshimene 89' (pen.)	Report		Stadium: Godswill Akpabio Stadium

21 July 2021 33	Rivers United	1–1	Akwa United	Port Harcourt
15:00 BST	Bamba Bakari 87'	Report	Charles Atshimene 53'	Stadium: Adokiye Amiesimaka Stadium

21 July 2021 34	Akwa United	3–0	Warri Wolves	Uyo
15:00 BST	Charles Atshimene 7' (pen.), 58'; Friday 25'	Report		Stadium: Godswill Akpabio Stadium

25 July 2021 35	Akwa United	3–0	Jigawa Stars	Uyo
15:00 BST	Friday 45'; Charles Atshimene 52'; Wisdom Fernando 89'	Report		Stadium: Godswill Akpabio Stadium

28 July 2021 36	FC Ifeanyi Ubah	1–1	Akwa United	Nnewi
15:00 BST	Uzochukwu Ifejiofor 87'	Report	Friday 79'	Stadium: FC Ifeanyi Ubah Stadium

1 August 2021 37	Akwa United	5–2	MFM FC	Uyo
15:00 BST	Charles Atshimene 24' (85), 90' (pen.); Alimi Adebayo	Report	Michael Mbonu 68' (pen.); Dennis Obasi 89'	Stadium: Godswill Akpabio Stadium

5 August 2021 38	Lobi Stars	2–1	Akwa United	Makurdi
15:00 BST	Chinonso Okonkwo 33'; Austin Ogunye 45' (pen.)	Report	Charles Atshimene 37' (pen.)	Stadium: Aper Aku Stadium

=== Nigeria FA Cup ===
Akwa United were Akwa Ibom State's sole representative in the Aiteo Cup. The Uyo club suffered an early exit from the competition, as they lost to Gateway United 1-0 at the FIFA Goal Project Pitch. Ilechukwu Julius scored the only goal of the game.

== Transfers ==
=== In ===
Date	Position	Nationality	Name	From	Fee
1 July 2020	CB	(Nigeria)	Charles Okafor	(Nigeria) Ifeanyi Ubah	Undisclosed
1 July 2020	RW	(Nigeria)	Samuel Amadi	(Nigeria) Warri Wolves	Undisclosed
1 July 2020	RW / LW	(Ghana)	Sadick Abass	(Nigeria) Enugu Rangers	Undisclosed
1 January 2021	CF	(Nigeria)	Charles Atshimene	(Nigeria) Warri Wolves	Undisclosed
24 April 2021	RW	(Nigeria)	Eko Barine	(Nigeria) Malkiya Club	Undisclosed

Total spending:

=== Out ===
Date	Position	Nationality	Name	To	Fee
7 April 2021	CM	(Nigeria)	Morice Chukwu	(Nigeria) Rivers United	Undisclosed
1 May 2021	RW	(Nigeria)	Ifeanyi Eze	(Nigeria) Kano Pillars	Undisclosed
7 May 2021	CF	(Nigeria)	Ndifreke Effiong	(Nigeria) Al-Ahly Benghazi	Undisclosed
26 August 2021	CB	(Nigeria)	Olisa Ndah	(South Africa) Orlando Pirates	Undisclosed

Total incoming:
