= 2020–21 Nigeria Professional Football League =

Nigeria Professional Football League season

Nigeria Professional Football League
- Season: 2020–2021
- Champions: Akwa United; 1st title
- Relegated: Warri Wolves; Jigawa Golden Stars; Ifeanyiubah; Adamawa United
- Champions League: Akwa United; Rivers United
- Confederation Cup: Enyimba
- Matches: 380
- Goals: 789 (2.08 per match)
- Top goalscorer: Silas Nwankwo & Charles Atshimene (19 goals)
- Biggest home win: Kwara 5–0 Adamawa (21 March 2021)
- Highest scoring: Nasarawa 5–3 Abia Warriors (28 March 2021)
- Longest winning run: Kano Pillars & Enyimba (4 matches)
- Longest unbeaten run: Akwa United (18 matches)
- Longest winless run: Sunshine Stars (18 matches)
- Longest losing run: Adamawa United (5 matches)
- All statistics correct as of 6 August 2021.

The 2020–21 Nigeria Professional Football League (NPFL) was the 50th season of the top flight league in the Nigeria football league system and the 31st since its rebranding. The league started on 27 December 2020 after much delay and concluded on 5 August 2021.

Enyimba were the defending champions from the 2019 season but failed to defend their title after finishing third on the table.

The season was initially scheduled to commence on 6 December 2020 but after much delay, the League Management Company announced that the league would start on 27 December 2020 with all matches played behind closed doors.

This season featured the 20 teams from the 2019–20 season as no clubs were promoted nor relegated as the season was cancelled due to the COVID-19 pandemic

The League Management Company announced that only 13 stadiums across the country were eligible to host league matches as part of a broader club licensing regime, they were certified to have met minimum requirements to host games. Another 11 were recommended for varying degrees of upgrade and repair works before they can be certified

This season saw a return of live NPFL matches. Selected matches were viewed live on NPFL TV and on NTA.

On 1 August 2021, Akwa United won their first NPFL title after a convincing 5–2 home win over MFM with a game left. Akwa United also set a league record with their 18-match unbeaten run, surpassing Enyimba in 2005 and Kano Pillars 2019–20 13-match unbeaten sequence.

Warri Wolves, Jigawa Golden Stars, Ifeanyiubah and Adamawa United were all confirmed relegated at the end of the campaign.

Nasarawa's Silas Nwankwo won the Eunisell golden boot award as the league topscorer for scoring lesser penalties having been tied with Akwa United's Charles Atshimene.

== Teams information ==
Locations of the 2020–21 Nigeria Professional Football League teams

=== Clubs ===
The league consisted of 20 teams from the previous season.

Team	Location	Stadium	Head coach
Abia Warriors	Umuahia	Okigwe Stadium (Note: Abia Warriors played their first two home games at the Enyimba International Stadium.)	(Nigeria) Imama Amapakabo
Adamawa United	Yola	Pantami Stadium	(Nigeria) Justin Madugu
Akwa United F.C.	Uyo	Godswill Akpabio International Stadium	(Nigeria) Kennedy Boboye
Dakkada	Uyo	Godswill Akpabio International Stadium	(Nigeria) Lawrence Kingsley
Enugu Rangers	Enugu	Nnamdi Azikiwe Stadium	(Nigeria) Salisu Yusuf
Enyimba	Aba	Enyimba International Stadium	(Nigeria) Fatai Osho
Heartland F.C.	Owerri	Okigwe Stadium	(Nigeria) Fidelis Ilechukwu
Ifeanyi Ubah F.C.	Nnewi	Ifeanyi Ubah FC International Stadium	(Nigeria) Uche Okagbue
Jigawa Golden Stars	Dutse	Ahmadu Bello Stadium	(Nigeria) Gilbert Opana
Kano Pillars	Kano	Ahmadu Bello Stadium	(Nigeria) Ibrahim Musa
Katsina United	Katsina	Muhammadu Dikko Stadium	(Nigeria) Azeez Mohammed
Kwara United	Ilorin	Kwara State Stadium	(Nigeria) Abdullahi Biffo
Lobi Stars	Makurdi	Aper Aku Stadium	(Nigeria) Kabiru Dogo
MFM F.C.	Lagos	Agege Stadium	(Nigeria) Gabriel Olalekan
Nasarawa United	Lafia	Lafia Township Stadium	(Nigeria) Bala Nikyu
Plateau United	Jos	New Jos Stadium	(Nigeria) Abdul Maikaba
Rivers United	Port Harcourt	Yakubu Gowon Stadium	(Nigeria) Stanley Eguma
Sunshine Stars	Akure	Akure Township Stadium	(Nigeria) Deji Ayeni
Warri Wolves	Warri	Delta State Polytechnic Stadium	(Nigeria) Ortega Deniran
Wikki Tourists F.C.	Bauchi	Abubakar Tafawa Balewa Stadium	(Nigeria) Bala Jibrin

=== Managerial changes ===
Team	Outgoing manager	Manner of departure	Date of departure	Incoming manager	Date of appointment
Jigawa Golden Stars	(Nigeria) Dodo Isah	Sacked	20 January	(Nigeria) Gilbert Opana	20 January
Katsina United	(Nigeria) Bishir Sadauki	End of interim management	21 January	(Nigeria) Baldwin Bazuaye	21 January
MFM	(Nigeria) Tony Bulus	Resignation	10 February	(Nigeria) Gabriel Olalekan	22 February
Kano Pillars	(France) Lionel Soccoïa	Resignation	16 March	(Nigeria) Ibrahim Musa	17 March
Warri Wolves	(Nigeria) Evans Ogenyi	Sacked	17 March	(Nigeria) Ortega Deniran	20 May
Katsina United	(Nigeria) Baldwin Bazuaye	Demotion to assistant coach	3 May	(Nigeria) Azeez Mohammed	3 May
Wikki Tourists	(Nigeria) (France) Usman Abd'Allah	Resignation	18 May	(Nigeria) Bala Jibrin	20 May
Sunshine Stars	(Nigeria) Gbenga Ogunbote	Resignation	27 May	(Nigeria) Deji Ayeni	1 June

== Summary ==
=== League table ===
Pos	Team	Pld	W	D	L	GF	GA	GD	Pts	Qualification or relegation
1	Akwa United (C)	38	19	14	5	53	24	+29	71	Qualification for the Champions League
2	Rivers United	38	19	9	10	50	34	+16	66	Qualification for the Champions League
3	Enyimba	38	18	12	8	41	33	+8	66	Qualification for the Confederation Cup
4	Kwara United	38	19	8	11	48	28	+20	65	
5	Nasarawa United	38	20	5	13	55	38	+17	65	
6	Kano Pillars	38	19	7	12	38	29	+9	64	
7	Enugu Rangers	38	18	8	12	43	31	+12	62	
8	Lobi Stars	38	17	7	14	43	39	+4	58	
9	Plateau United	38	14	9	15	45	35	+10	51	
10	MFM	38	13	12	13	34	35	−1	51	
11	Dakkada	38	15	5	18	37	47	−10	50	
12	Katsina United	38	14	7	17	35	42	−7	49	
13	Heartland	38	13	9	16	43	50	−7	48	
14	Abia Warriors	38	12	11	15	48	42	+6	47	
15	Wikki Tourists	38	12	9	17	40	47	−7	45	
16	Sunshine Stars	38	11	12	15	28	39	−11	45	
17	Warri Wolves	38	11	8	19	30	45	−15	41	Relegation to the National League
18	Jigawa Golden Stars	38	10	10	18	27	48	−21	40	Relegation to the National League
19	Ifeanyiubah	38	9	12	17	33	50	−17	39	Relegation to the National League
20	Adamawa United	38	5	10	23	20	55	−35	25	Relegation to the National League

Source: NPFL
Rules for classification: 1) points; 2) goal difference; 3) number of goals scored
(C) Champions

=== Results ===
Home \ Away	ABW	ADA	AKW	DAK	ENU	ENY	HEA	IFU	JGS	KAN	KAT	KWA	LOB	MFM	NAS	PLA	RIV	SUN	WWV	WIK
Abia Warriors		5–1	0–0	0–1	1–0	0–1	2–1	1–1	1–3	4–1	3–1	2–1	2–0	0–0	3–1	2–1	0–1	4–1	4–1	1–0
Adamawa United	1–1		0–1	2–0	1–1	1–2	0–1	1–1	2–0	1–1	1–0	0–2	1–0	1–1	0–0	0–2	2–0	0–0	3–3	0–0
Akwa United	2–1	2–0		0–0	0–0	1–0	3–1	1–0	3–0	1–0	3–0	2–1	3–0	5–2	2–1	1–0	3–0	2–1	3–0	1–1
Dakkada	2–1	4–0	0–2		1–1	1–3	1–0	2–1	2–1	3–2	1–0	2–0	0–1	1–1	0–0	1–0	4–2	1–2	2–0	2–1
Enugu Rangers	2–1	1–0	1–0	3–0		2–0	2–0	2–1	3–0	2–0	1–0	1–0	0–0	1–1	2–0	2–0	0–1	4–1	1–0	2–1
Enyimba	1–0	2–1	1–1	1–0	2–1		0–0	2–2	2–1	2–1	1–0	1–0	2–1	2–1	0–0	2–1	1–1	1–1	1–1	1–0
Heartland	2–2	2–1	2–1	2–1	2–1	2–0		1–1	2–1	1–0	2–0	0–0	2–0	2–0	1–2	0–0	2–2	0–1	1–1	2–0
Ifeanyi Ubah	1–1	3–0	1–1	0–1	0–0	1–1	2–1		2–2	0–1	3–0	2–1	1–0	0–2 (Note: The match was initially awarded to MFM as a 3–0 win after Ifeanyiubah failed to show up for the game, however, after Ifeanyiubah appealed regarding the issue, the League Management Company decided the match would be played at a neutral venue on 30 July, MFM won the rescheduled fixture 2–0.)	2–1	0–0	0–0	1–0	1–0	1–0
Jigawa GS	0–0	1–0	1–1	1–1	0–1	0–0	2–1	3–0		1–0	0–1	0–0	2–1	1–0	1–0	1–0	0–3 (Note: Matchday 34 fixture between Jigawa Golden Stars and Rivers United initially ended a 2–1 win for the hosts. However, on 5 August, the NFF and LMC awarded the fixture as a 0–3 win for Rivers United after it appeared that Jigawa had fielded an ineligible player at the match. This decision consequently altered the teams positions at the end of the season.)	1–0	1–1	1–1
Kano Pillars	1–0	1–0	0–0	2–0	1–1	2–1	2–1	1–0	2–0		2–0	2–0	3–0	1–0	1–0	1–0	1–0	1–0	1–0	1–0
Katsina United	1–0	2–0	1–0	2–0	2–0	3–1	3–2	3–0	1–0	1–1		1–2	1–1	0–0	2–1	0–0	2–1	0–0	1–0	5–1
Kwara United	1–1	5–0	1–1	3–0	2–0	1–0	0–0	1–0	3–0	1–0	3–0		2–1	1–0	2–0	2–0	1–1	1–0	2–0	3–1
Lobi Stars	0–0	1–0	2–1	2–1	1–0	1–1	3–0	2–0	2–1	1–0	2–1	2–0		1–0	3–2	3–2	4–1	2–1	3–0	0–0
MFM	0–0	2–0	1–2	1–0	1–1	1–0	1–2	1–1	2–0	2–1	0–0	0–0	1–0		1–0	3–1	2–2	1–0	2–1	1–0
Nasarawa United	5–3	1–0	2–1	3–0	3–0	1–2	3–1	3–0	3–1	1–1	1–0	2–1	1–0	1–0		2–0	2–1	4–0	3–1	2–1
Plateau United	2–1	3–0	0–0	2–0	2–1	0–0	3–0	4–0	3–0	0–0	2–0	0–2	0–0	3–1	1–0		1–1	3–1	2–0	4–1
Rivers United	0–0	1–0	1–1	2–0	1–0	1–0	3–1	2–0	2–0	2–0	1–0	3–0	3–1	2–0	2–0	3–1		1–0	2–1	1–1
Sunshine Stars	2–1	0–0	0–0	1–0	3–1	0–1	1–1	1–0	0–0	1–0	0–0	1–2	2–2	0–0	0–0	3–2	1–0		1–0	1–0
Warri Wolves	2–0	1–0	0–0	0–1	0–1	1–1	1–0	3–1	0–0	1–1	3–0	1–0	1–0	0–2	1–2	1–0	1–0	2–1		1–0
Wikki Tourists	1–0	2–0	2–2	2–1	2–1	1–2	4–2	4–3	2–0	1–2	3–1	1–1	1–0	2–0	1–2	0–0	1–0	0–0	1–0	

Source: NPFL
Legend: Blue = home team win; Yellow = draw; Red = away team win.

=== Positions by round ===
To preserve chronological evolvements, any postponed matches are not included to the round at which they were originally scheduled, but added to the full round they were played immediately afterwards. For example, if a match is scheduled for round 7, but then played between rounds 8 and 9, it will be added to the standings for round 8.

Team ╲ Round	1	2	3	4	5	6	7	8	9	10	11	12	13	14	15	16	17	18	19	20	21	22	23	24	25	26	27	28	29	30	31	32	33	34	35	36	37	38
Abia Warriors	16	20	19	20	20	19	19	19	19	17	16	17	14	12	10	12	10	11	10	12	12	13	13	13	13	13	13	13	13	14	15	14	15	14	14	14	14	14
Adamawa United	9	15	18	19	19	20	20	20	20	20	20	20	20	20	20	20	20	20	20	20	20	20	20	20	20	20	20	20	20	20	20	20	20	20	20	20	20	20
Akwa United	11	17	11	12	13	15	13	9	6	7	6	6	5	5	6	5	4	3	3	1	1	1	2	1	2	1	1	1	1	1	1	1	1	1	1	1	1	1
Dakkada	12	4	3	5	7	12	8	12	7	9	12	15	7	8	8	8	8	8	8	9	10	12	9	12	12	12	12	12	11	10	11	9	10	9	9	9	10	11
Enugu Rangers	17	10	8	2	4	6	10	5	5	5	4	5	2	2	2	4	2	5	6	5	6	6	6	6	6	9	6	7	7	7	7	7	7	7	7	7	7	7
Enyimba	5	6	5	10	5	3	2	1	1	2	2	3	3	4	3	7	6	6	5	7	9	10	7	7	7	6	7	5	5	5	4	5	4	4	4	3	5	3
Heartland	13	19	20	18	18	17	18	18	15	12	11	8	11	11	13	11	11	12	11	8	7	7	8	10	11	11	10	11	10	12	12	12	12	12	13	13	13	13
Ifeanyi Ubah	6	11	14	17	17	18	15	17	18	18	17	18	18	19	18	19	19	19	19	19	19	19	19	19	18	18	18	17	17	17	18	18	19	18	19	19	19	19
Jigawa GS	7	7	12	8	11	14	12	14	11	13	9	11	12	16	16	15	15	13	14	13	14	14	14	14	14	14	16	14	16	16	17	17	17	16	16	16	15	18
Kano Pillars	10	3	9	3	6	5	9	4	4	3	3	1	4	3	5	3	3	2	2	2	2	2	1	2	1	2	2	3	3	3	3	4	3	3	3	4	3	6
Katsina United	2	14	6	11	15	13	16	15	16	14	15	16	17	17	17	16	17	18	18	16	16	16	17	16	15	15	14	15	14	13	13	13	13	13	12	12	11	12
Kwara United	1	5	13	14	9	7	6	3	3	1	1	2	1	1	1	2	1	1	1	3	3	3	3	5	3	5	4	6	4	6	5	6	6	6	6	6	6	4
Lobi Stars	18	12	4	6	3	4	5	8	9	11	8	10	9	10	9	10	9	10	9	11	8	9	11	8	8	7	8	8	9	8	8	8	8	8	8	8	8	8
MFM	3	8	7	7	8	9	11	13	14	16	14	14	10	15	15	17	14	15	15	14	13	11	12	9	10	10	11	10	12	11	10	11	11	11	11	11	12	10
Nasarawa United	4	1	2	4	2	1	3	6	8	6	7	4	6	6	4	1	5	4	7	6	5	4	5	3	4	3	3	2	2	2	2	2	2	2	2	2	2	5
Plateau United	20	18	10	13	10	10	7	10	13	15	18	13	13	9	12	9	12	9	12	10	11	8	10	11	9	8	9	9	8	9	9	10	9	10	10	10	9	9
Rivers United	8	2	1	1	1	2	1	2	2	4	5	7	8	7	7	6	7	7	4	4	4	5	4	4	5	4	5	4	6	4	6	3	5	5	5	5	4	2
Sunshine Stars	19	13	15	15	12	8	4	7	10	8	10	12	16	14	14	14	16	17	16	18	17	18	18	18	19	19	19	18	18	18	16	16	16	17	17	16	17	16
Warri Wolves	14	9	16	9	14	16	17	16	17	19	19	19	19	18	19	18	18	16	17	17	18	17	16	17	16	17	17	19	19	19	19	19	18	19	18	18	18	17
Wikki Tourists	15	16	17	16	16	11	14	11	12	10	13	9	15	13	11	13	13	14	13	15	15	15	15	15	17	16	15	16	15	15	14	15	14	15	15	15	16	15

Leader
2021–22 CAF Champions League
2021–22 CAF Confederation Cup
Relegation to Nigeria National League

Source: World Football

== Statistics ==
=== Scoring ===
==== Top scorers ====
Rank	Player	Club	Goals
1	(Nigeria) Silas Nwankwo	Nasarawa United	19
1	(Nigeria) Charles Atshimene	Akwa United	19
3	(Nigeria) Rabiu Ali	Kano Pillars	14
3	(Nigeria) Michael Ohanu	Kwara United	14
5	(Nigeria) Zulkifilu Rabiu	Plateau United	13
5	(Nigeria) Sad'eeq Yusuf	Sunshine Stars	13
7	(Nigeria) Ossy Martins	Lobi Stars	11
7	(Nigeria) Chukwuemeka Obioma	Abia Warriors	11
9	(Nigeria) Jude Steven	Kwara United	10
9	(Nigeria) Christian Nnaji	Enugu Rangers	10
9	(Nigeria) Samuel Stone	Jigawa Golden Stars	10

==== Hattricks ====
Player	For	Against	Result	Date
(Nigeria) Jude Steven	Kwara United	Adamawa United	5–0 (H)	21 March 2021
(Nigeria) Silas Nwankwo	Nasarawa United	Abia Warriors	5–3 (H)	28 March 2021
(Nigeria) Nazifi Yahaya	Wikki Tourists	Ifeanyiubah	4–3 (H)	13 June 2021
(Nigeria) Michael Ohanu	Kwara United	Wikki Tourists	3–1 (H)	22 July 2021
(Nigeria) Chukwuemeka Obioma	Abia Warriors	Adamawa United	5–1 (H)	28 July 2021
(Nigeria) Charles Atshimene	Akwa United	MFM	5–2 (H)	1 August 2021

Notes

(H) – Home team

=== Top assists ===
Updated to match(es) played on 11 April 2021

Rank	Player	Club	Assists
1	(Nigeria) Auwalu Ali Malam	Kano Pillars	6
2	(Nigeria) Umwana Asuquo	Dakkada	5
2	(Nigeria) Stephen Jude	Kwara United	5
4	(Nigeria) Ndifreke Effiong	Akwa United	4
4	(Nigeria) Christian Ekong	Dakkada; Enyimba	4
4	(Nigeria) Elijah Akanni	MFM	4

=== Clean sheets ===
Rank	Player	Club	Clean sheets
1	(Nigeria) Dele Aiyenugba	Kwara United	16
1	(Nigeria) Adewale Adeyinka	Akwa United	16
3	(Nigeria) Stanley Nwabali	Lobi Stars	14
4	(Nigeria) Abubakar Adamu	Plateau United	10
4	(Nigeria) Sharp Uzoigwe	Ifeanyiubah	10
6	(Nigeria) Chinedu Anozie	Plateau United	8
6	(Nigeria) Chijioke Ejiogu	Heartland	8

== Awards ==
=== Monthly awards ===
Month	Manager of the Month		Player of the Month		References
Month	Manager	Club	Player	Club	References
January	(Nigeria) Gbenga Ogunbote	Sunshine Stars	(Nigeria) Sad'eeq Yusuf	Sunshine Stars	
February	(Nigeria) Fatai Osho	Enyimba	(Nigeria) Ndifreke Effiong	Akwa United	

=== Season's award ===
Eunisell golden boot

The golden boot award was won by Nasarawa's Silas Nwankwo. He won having scored lesser penalties than Akwa United's Charles Atshimene as they were tied at 19 goals.
