= 2019–20 Nigeria Professional Football League =

Nigeria Professional Football League season

Nigeria Professional Football League
- Season: 2019–2020
- Promoted: Dakkada; Warri Wolves; Jigawa Golden Stars; Adamawa United
- Relegated: None
- Champions League: Plateau United; Enyimba
- Confederation Cup: Rivers United; Kano Pillars
- Matches: 246
- Goals: 494 (2.01 per match)
- Top goalscorer: Israel Abia (12 goals)
- Biggest home win: Kano Pillars 6–1 Kwara United (Note: This match was originally played by Delta Force) (8 December 2019) Plateau United 5–0 Adamawa United (19 January 2020) Heartland 5–0 Adamawa United (16 February 2020)
- Biggest away win: Adamawa United 0–3 Sunshine Stars (15 December 2019) Dakkada 0–3 Nasarawa United (16 January 2020) Abia Warriors 1–4 Enyimba (17 February 2020)
- Highest scoring: Kano Pillars 6–1 Kwara United (8 December 2019)
- Longest winning run: Enyimba & Akwa United (5 matches)
- Longest unbeaten run: Kano Pillars (13 matches)
- Longest winless run: Wikki Tourists & Nasarawa United (8 matches)
- Longest losing run: Adamawa United (5 matches)
- All statistics correct as of 11 August 2020.

The 2019–2020 Nigeria Professional Football League was the 49th season of the top-flight division of the Nigerian football league system and the 30th season since its rebranding as the 'Professional League'. The league started on 3 November 2019 but was cancelled in July due to the effects of the COVID-19 pandemic with no champions and no teams relegated. Enyimba were the defending champions, after winning the Super 6 play-offs the previous season

The league was initially halted on 18 March 2020 following a decision by the League Management Company to suspend the league due to the COVID-19 pandemic with no decision made on the league's resumption. On 10 July 2020 however, the league was cancelled by the NFF for the second time in three seasons (after the 2018 season ended in a similar way), following an online meeting between its executive committee and the league board with no champions and no relegation or promotion from the National League, and stopped at Matchday 25.

As a result of this, the league's representatives at the continental competitions next season were decided by the PPG system, which created confusion and disagreement among the teams as Rivers United refused to accept their CAF Confederation Cup spot initially given to them.

Based on the points per game system, Plateau United and Enyimba will represent the country at the 2020–21 CAF Champions League while Rivers United will participate at the CAF Confederation Cup, since the 2020 Federation Cup was cancelled, Kano Pillars, the 2019 Federation Cup champions, will take the second CAF Confederation Cup spot.

== Teams ==
The league consisted of 20 teams, the 4 promoted teams from the Nigeria National League and the remaining 16 teams from the previous season. On 28 November, Kwara United bought Delta Force's slot and replaced them in the league.

Note: Table lists in alphabetical order.

Team	Location	Stadium
Abia Warriors	Umuahia	Umuahia Township Stadium
Adamawa United	Yola	Pantami Stadium (Note: Adamawa United played their home matches at Pantami Stadium, Gombe instead of their regular home stadium Ribadu Square Stadium, Yola as it didn't meet LMC's stadium requirements)
Akwa United F.C.	Uyo	Godswill Akpabio International Stadium
Dakkada	Uyo	Godswill Akpabio International Stadium
Enugu Rangers	Enugu	Nnamdi Azikiwe Stadium
Enyimba	Aba	Enyimba International Stadium
Heartland F.C.	Owerri	Okigwe Stadium
Ifeanyi Ubah F.C.	Nnewi	Ifeanyi Ubah FC International Stadium
Jigawa Golden Stars	Dutse	Sani Abacha Stadium (Note: Jigawa Golden Stars shared Kano Pillars' Sani Abacha Stadium as their home stadium instead of their regular home stadium Hadejia Stadium, Hadejia as it didn't meet LMC's stadium requirements)
Kano Pillars	Kano	Sani Abacha Stadium
Katsina United	Katsina	Muhammadu Dikko Stadium
Kwara United	Ilorin	Kwara State Stadium
Lobi Stars	Makurdi	Aper Aku Stadium
MFM F.C.	Lagos	Agege Stadium
Nasarawa United	Lafia	Lafia Township Stadium
Plateau United	Jos	New Jos Stadium
Rivers United	Port Harcourt	Liberation Stadium
Sunshine Stars	Akure	Akure Township Stadium
Warri Wolves	Warri	Warri Township Stadium
Wikki Tourists F.C.	Bauchi	Abubakar Tafawa Balewa Stadium

== Locations ==
Locations of the 2019-20 Nigerian Professional Football League Teams

== League table ==
Pos	Team	Pld	W	D	L	GF	GA	GD	Pts	PPG	
1	Plateau United	25	14	7	4	36	15	+21	49	1.96	Qualification to the 2020–21 CAF Champions League
2	Enyimba (Note: Enyimba were ranked higher than Rivers United despite having the same PPG, they were ranked based on the 'Weighty Points Per Game' system.)	20	11	3	6	30	20	+10	36	1.80	Qualification to the 2020–21 CAF Champions League
3	Rivers United	25	13	6	6	28	15	+13	45	1.80	Qualification to the 2020–21 CAF Confederation Cup
4	Lobi Stars	25	12	7	6	26	19	+7	43	1.72	
5	Enugu Rangers	24	10	7	7	25	20	+5	37	1.54	
6	Kano Pillars (Note: Since the 2020 Federation Cup was cancelled, Kano Pillars, the 2019 Federation Cup champions will qualify for the CAF Confederation Cup.)	24	8	10	6	27	18	+9	34	1.42	Qualification to the 2020–21 CAF Confederation Cup
7	Katsina United	24	9	7	8	18	25	−7	34	1.42	
8	Akwa United F.C.	25	8	11	6	23	22	+1	35	1.40	
9	Warri Wolves	24	9	6	9	25	23	+2	33	1.38	
10	Sunshine Stars	25	9	7	9	27	29	−2	34	1.36	
11	Ifeanyi Ubah F.C.	25	10	3	12	25	28	−3	33	1.32	
12	Dakkada	26	8	10	8	26	26	0	34	1.31	
13	Heartland F.C.	25	9	5	11	21	21	0	32	1.28	
14	MFM F.C.	25	8	7	10	19	19	0	31	1.24	
15	Wikki Tourists F.C.	25	8	7	10	23	24	−1	31	1.24	
16	Abia Warriors	25	8	6	11	23	28	−5	30	1.20	
17	Nasarawa United	25	8	5	12	27	27	0	29	1.16	
18	Jigawa Golden Stars	25	9	2	14	25	35	−10	29	1.16	
19	Kwara United (Note: Delta Force played the first 7 matches of the season, then sold their league spot to Kwara United, which took over their record and remaining fixtures.)	25	8	4	13	23	33	−10	28	1.12	
20	Adamawa United	25	6	2	17	17	47	−30	20	0.80	

Source: NPFL
Rules for classification: 1) points; 2) goal difference; 3) number of goals scored.

== Results ==
Home \ Away	ABW	ADA	AKW	DAK	ENU	ENY	HEA	IFU	JGS	KAN	KAT	KWA	LOB	MFM	NAS	PLA	RIV	SUN	WWV	WIK
Abia Warriors		2–1	2–1	1–1	–	1–4	–	2–1	2–1	0–0	2–0	–	–	1–0	–	3–0	–	1–1	1–0	–
Adamawa United	1–0		–	–	1–1	0–2	1–0	2–1	–	–	4–0	2–1	0–1	–	2–1	–	0–2	0–3	0–1	0–0
Akwa United	0–0	4–0		2–2	0–0	–	3–1	–	–	–	0–0	0–2	1–0	–	1–1	–	2–1	–	1–1	1–0
Dakkada	–	4–1	0–1		2–3	2–1	1–0	1–0	2–0	1–2	–	0–0	–	–	0–3	0–0	2–1	–	1–0	–
Enugu Rangers	3–1	2–0	1–2	0–2		–	–	3–1	1–0	1–0	1–0	–	–	0–1	–	0–0	1–0	1–0	3–0	–
Enyimba	2–1	2–0	3–1	–	–		0–2	–	–	–	–	2–0	1–1	–	3–1	–	1–0	3–0	–	3–0
Heartland	1–0	5–0	–	1–1	2–1	–		–	1–0	1–1	0–0	–	2–0	0–1	–	1–0	0–2	1–0	–	–
Ifeanyi Ubah		1–0	0–0	2–1	–	2–0	1–0		–	–	–	1–0	0–0	1–0	–	–	1–0	3–1	3–1	2–0
Jigawa GS	–	3–2	0–1	–	–	1–1	2–1	2–1		1–0	–	2–1	1–0	–	1–0	0–1	1–1	–	2–1	2–1
Kano Pillars	–	2–0	2–0	2–0	–	–	–	1–0	2–0		–	6–1	0–1	1–0	–	–	0–0	–	1–1	0–0
Katsina United	1–0	–	1–1	0–0	–	1–1	–	1–0	3–2	1–1		–	–		1–0	1–0	–	2–0	2–1	–
Kwara United	2–0	–	–	1–1	1–0	–	0–1	–	4–1	–	2–0		0–1	1–0	–	1–3	1–1	0–0	–	1–0
Lobi Stars	1–0	–	–	0–0	1–1	–	3–0	1–0	–	2–2	1–0	4–0		1–0	2–1	0–0	–	2–0	–	2–1
MFM	2–1	2–0	3–0	1–0	0–0	0–1	0–0	1–1	2–1	3–1	–	–	–		0–0	0–0	–	–	1–1	–
Nasarawa United	3–1	–	0–0	–	2–1	2–0	1–0	3–2	1–0	0–0	3–0	0–1		–		1–1	–	–	1–2	0–1
Plateau United	–	5–0	0–0	2–0	–	4–0	–	5–1	2–1	0–0	–	2–1	3–1	–	2–1		1–0	–	1–0	2–1
Rivers United	0–0	–	–	–	2–1	–	1–1	1–0	–	2–1	2–0	1–0	2–1	2–0	1–0	–		2–1	3–0	0–0
Sunshine Stars	1–0	–	1–0	1–1	0–0	1–0	–	2–0	2–0	2–2	1–2	–	–	1–1	4–2	2–1	–		1–1	–
Warri Wolves	–	2–0	1–1	–	1–2	–	1–0	–	–	–	2–0	2–1	0–0	2–0	–	–	0–1	3–0		1–0
Wikki Tourists	1–1	–	–	1–1	1–1	–	1–0	–	2–1	1–0	1–1	3–1	4–0	2–1	1–0	0–1	–	1–2	–	

Source: NPFL
Legend: Blue = home team win; Yellow = draw; Red = away team win.

== Season statistics ==
=== Scoring ===
==== Top scorers ====
Rank	Player	Club	Goals
1	(Nigeria) Israel Abia	Enugu Rangers	12
2	(Nigeria) Ibrahim Mustapha	Plateau United	11
2	(Nigeria) Ndifreke Effiong Udo	Akwa United	11
2	(Nigeria) Auwalu Ali Mallam	Kano Pillars	11
5	(Nigeria) Victor Mbaoma	Enyimba	9
6	(Nigeria) Tasiu Lawal	Katsina United	8
6	(Nigeria) Stanley Dimgba	Enyimba	8
6	(Nigeria) Malachi Ohawume	Rivers United	8

=== Clean sheets ===
Rank	Player	Club	Clean sheets
1	(Nigeria) Chinedu Anozie	Plateau United	10
2	(Cameroon) Jean Efala	Akwa United	9
3	(Nigeria) Suraj Ayeleso	Kano Pillars	8
3	(Nigeria) Sharp Uzoigwe	FC Ifeanyi Ubah	8
3	(Nigeria) Abayomi Folarin	MFM FC	8
3	(Nigeria) Vincent Edafe	Dakkada	8
3	(Nigeria) Ibrahim Pius	Wikki Tourists FC	8

== News ==
- This was the 30th Anniversary of the Nigerian Professional Football League since attaining professionalism in 1990.
- On 29 November 2019, Ifeanyi Ubah's bus was attacked by armed robbers near Lokoja, Kogi State's capital during a trip to Kano for their match against Jigawa Golden Stars which left players and members of the coaching crew "critically injured" according to the club.
- Katsina United and Kano Pillars were fined N3.5 million($9) and N1.5 million($3.8) by the League Management Company on 25 January 2020 for their fans misconduct during their fixture 10 days earlier in Katsina.
- In a similar incident, the 16 January 2020 fixture between Abia Warriors and Enyimba was postponed to Monday, 17 January 2020 and played without spectators after the match was disrupted and couldn't be completed on the initial date. Abia Warriors were later fined by the League Management Company for fan violence.
- Nasarawa United's defender Chineme Martins collapsed at the Lafia Township Stadium during a home league match versus Katsina United on 8 March 2020. He was attended to by medics and later rushed to an hospital where he was later confirmed dead. The Nigeria Football Federation ordered all NPFL clubs to provide all necessary medical equipment and personnel before hosting any other game. Owing to the poor first aid assistance at the stadium. All players wore black armbands and a minute's silence held before the commencement of all Matchday 24 games as tribute. A round of applause was held for him at the 20th minute of each game.
- Enugu Rangers duo Ifeanyi George and Emmanuel Ogbu were involved in an auto crash which claimed their lives and the life of a third person. The accident occurred in Abudu at the Benin-Agbor road while the players were travelling to Lagos after the season was suspended due to the COVID-19 pandemic.
