= Paul Onobi =

Nigerian footballer (born 1992)

Personal information
- Full name: Paul Odeh Onobi
- Date of birth: 27 December 1992 (age 33)
- Place of birth: Makurdi, Nigeria
- Height: 1.83 m (6 ft 0 in)
- Position: Defensive midfielder

Team information
- Current team: Rivers United

Senior career*
Years	Team	Apps	(Gls)
2008–2010	Niger Tornadoes		
2010–2011	Warri Wolves		
2012	Enyimba		
2013–2015	Sunshine Stars	42	(5)
2016	KuPS	22	(0)
2017	Abia Warriors	2	(0)
2017	Lobi Stars	5	(0)
2018–2019	Al-Nojoom		
2019–2020	Al-Bukiryah	9	(0)
2019–2020	Kazma		
2021–2022	Nasarawa United	6	(3)
2022–2023	Wikki Tourists	2	(0)
2023	Rivers United	10	(0)
2023–2024	Al-Shabab Seeb	4	(0)
2025–	Rivers United	2	(0)

International career
2015–2016	Nigeria	7	(0)
- * Club domestic league appearances and goals as of 15 March 2025

Paul Odeh Onobi (born 27 December 1992) is a Nigerian professional football player who plays as a defensive midfielder for Rivers United in the Nigeria Premier Football League. He has been capped seven times for the Nigeria national team in 2015–2016, representing his country at the 2016 African Nations Championship tournament.

== Career statistics ==
=== Club ===
As of 15 March 2025

Appearances and goals by club, season and competition
Club	Season	League			Cup (Note: Includes Suomen Cup and Saudi King's Cup)		Total	
Club	Season	Division	Apps	Goals	Apps	Goals	Apps	Goals
Niger Tornadoes	2008–09	NPFL			–			
Niger Tornadoes	2009–10	NPFL			–			
Warri Wolves	2010–11	NPFL			–			
Enyimba	2012	NPFL			–			
Sunshine Stars	2013	NPFL	3	0	–		3	0
Sunshine Stars	2014	NPFL	9	0	–		9	0
Sunshine Stars	2015	NPFL	30	5	–		30	5
Sunshine Stars	Total		42	5	0	0	42	5
KuPS	2016	Veikkausliiga	22	0	1	0	23	0
Abia Warriors	2017	NPFL	2	0	–		2	0
Lobi Stars	2017	NPFL	5	0	–		5	0
Al-Nojoom	2018–19	Saudi First Division			–			
Al-Bukiryah	2019–20	Saudi First Division	9	0	2	0	11	0
Kazma	2019–20	Kuwait Premier League			–			
Nasarawa United	2021–22	NPFL	6	3	–		6	3
Wikki Tourists	2022–23	NPFL	2	0	–		2	0
Rivers United	2023–24	NPFL	10	0	–		10	0
Al-Shabab Seeb	2023–24	Oman Professional League	4	0	–		4	0
Rivers United	2024–25	NPFL	2	0	–		2	0
Career total			104	8	3	0	107	8

=== International ===
As of 26 January 2016

Appearances and goals by national team and year
National team	Year	Apps	Goals
Nigeria	2015	3	0
Nigeria	2016	4	0
Total		7	0

== Honours ==
Individual

- Nigeria Pitch Awards: Midfielder of the Year, 2016
