= Michael Ohanu =

Nigerian footballer (born 1998)

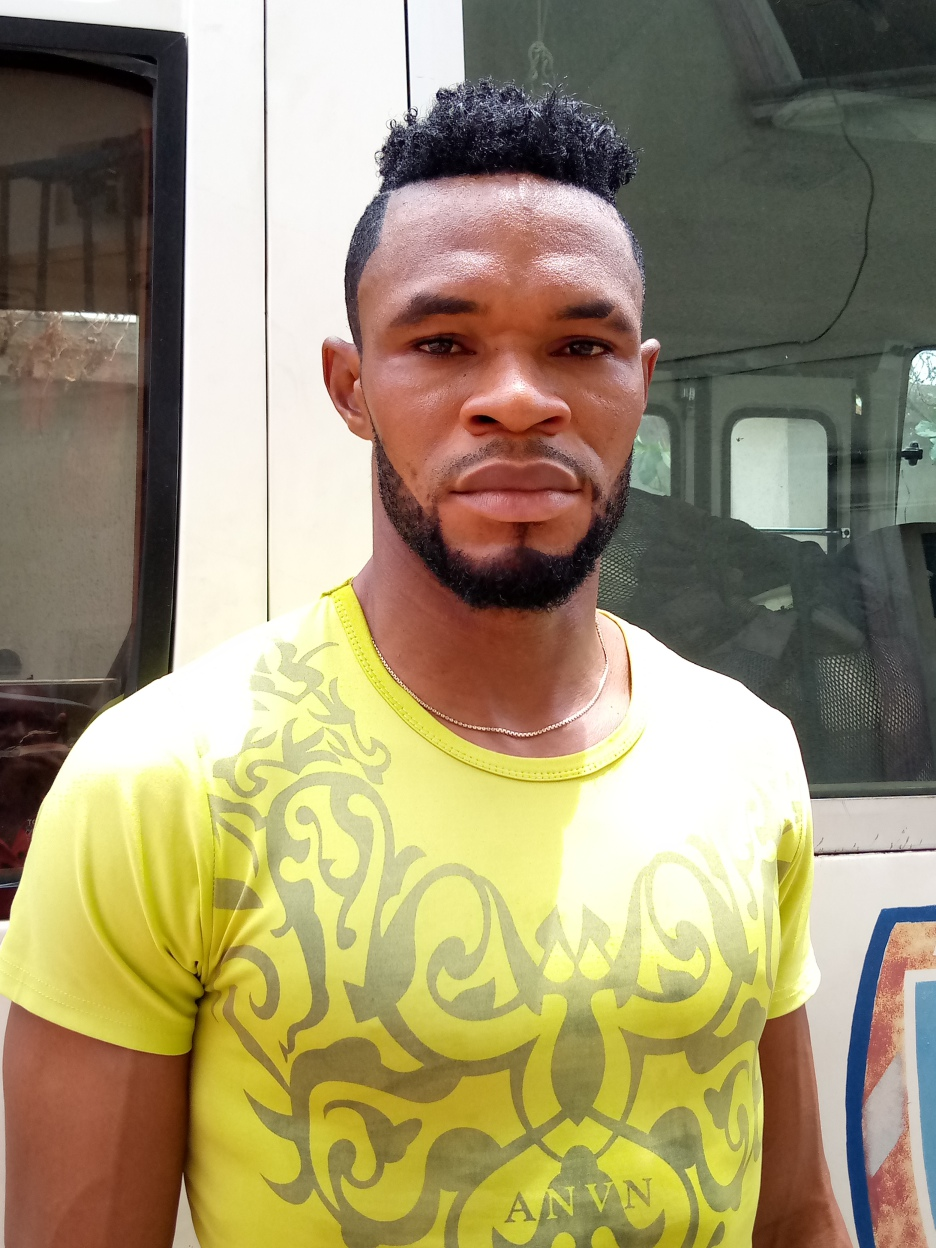
- Michael Ohanu

Personal information
- Date of birth: 1 June 1998 (age 28)
- Place of birth: Kano, Nigeria
- Height: 1.83 m (6 ft 0 in)
- Position: Forward

Youth career
- 2012–2013: Enugu Rangers Academy

Senior career*
Years	Team	Apps	(Gls)
2013–2014	Gabros		
2014–2015	FC Ifeanyi Ubah		
2015–2018	Kwara United		
2017–2018	→ El-Kanemi Warriors (loan)		
2018–2020	MFM	8	(2)
2019–2020	→ Akwa United (loan)		
2020–2021	Kwara United	20	(7)
2021–2022	Al-Shorta	6	(0)
- * Club domestic league appearances and goals as of 17 May 2022

Michael Ohanu // (born 1 June 1998) is a Nigerian association footballer who last played for Al-Shorta SC. He plays as a centre forward.

== Personal life ==
Ohanu hails from Aboh Mbaise Local Government Area of Imo State

== Club career ==
Ohanu began his youth career with Enugu Rangers Academy. He joined the Enugu outfit in 2013. The following year, he was recruited by second division side, Gabros after an impressive tryout.

Ohanu scored eight goals in his debut season with the Nnewi club, helping them earn promotion to the elite division.

Shortly after their promotion to the NPFL, Gabros were acquired by Nnewi billionaire Ifeanyi Ubah and their name was changed to F.C. Ifeanyi Ubah.

He was outstanding for Gabros in the 2014-15 season matchday seven 2–0 win over Enyimba in Nnewi on 3 May 2015.

After a season with FC Ifeanyi Ubah, Ohanu moved to Kwara United, who were in the second division at the time.

The striker finished as the top scorer in the division with 21 goals and Kwara United secured promotion to the NPFL. He also won the Bet9ja Nigeria National League player of the 2016–17 season at the Gala held on 10 January 2018.

on 21 April 21, 2018, Ohanu joined El-Kanemi Warriors on loan in the midseason of 2017-18 season, following two-and-a-half seasons with Kwara United.

He scored on his debut for El-Kanemi Warriors in the final match of the first round, on 29 April 2018, helping the northeast club secure a 2–0 home win over Nasarawa United. His 54th-minute effort put the icing on the cake, after Antonio De Souza had opened the scoring within eight minutes of the encounter.

After seeing out his six-month Elkanemi contract, he signed a two-year deal with MFM FC. On 10 February 2019, Ohanu scored his first goal of the 2018-19 season for MFM in a 3–2 comeback win over Niger Tornadoes in a Group A matchday eight tie at the Agege Stadium. He ended up scoring two goals in eight appearances for MFM during the second half of the 2018-19 season.

At the end of the 2018–19 season, Ohanu cut short his two-year MFM deal to join Akwa United on a one-year loan contract. He was unveiled alongside 14 new signings by the Promise Keepers ahead of the 2019-20 Nigeria Professional Football League season on 28 October 2019.

== Honours ==
=== Club honours ===
- Nigeria National League

2017 Nigeria National League Champion with Kwara United

=== Individual honours ===
- Nigeria National League

2017 Nigeria National League Topscorer (21 Goals)
