= 2017 Nigeria Professional Football League =

Nigeria Premier League
- Champions: Plateau United
- Relegated: Shooting Stars SC Remo Stars F.C. Gombe United F.C. ABS
- Champions League: Plateau United; MFM F.C.
- Confederation Cup: Enyimba
- Matches: 380
- Goals: 765 (2.01 per match)
- Top goalscorer: Anthony Okpotu (19)
- Biggest home win: Ifeanyi Uba 4-0 MFM (18 January 2017) MFM 4-0 Lobi Stars (22 January 2017) Nasarawa United 4-0 MFM (2 April 2017)
- Biggest away win: Shooting Stars 0-3 Ifeanyi Ubah; 27 May 2017)
- Highest scoring: Akwa United 4-2 Shooting Stars (2 April 2017) Gombe United 3-3 Enugu Rangers (10 May 2017)
- Longest winning run: El Kanemi Warriors (4)
- Longest unbeaten run: Plateau United (7)
- Longest winless run: Remo Stars (14)
- Longest losing run: Kano Pillars (4)
- Average attendance: 2,556
- All statistics correct as of 20 September 2017.

The 2017 Nigeria Professional Football League was the 46th season of the top Nigerian professional league for association football clubs, since its establishment in 1972, and the 27th since the rebranding of the league as the "Professional League". Plateau United won the league on the Saturday, 9 September 2017 with a 2-0 victory over Enugu Rangers.

Enugu Rangers won the previous edition, their seventh league title and first since 1984.

Plateau United's win of this edition is their first ever title, which came in their second season after being promoted to the top flight. It was intended to be rational, meaning in reserve purposes.

== Clubs ==
A total of 20 teams contested the league, these included 16 teams from the previous season and four teams promoted from the Nigeria National League. The season began on 14 January.

Locations of the Nigeria Premier League 2017 teams

== League table ==
Pos	Team	Pld	W	D	L	GF	GA	GD	Pts	Qualification
1	Plateau United (C)	38	19	9	10	49	25	+24	66	Qualification to the 2018 CAF Champions League
2	MFM	38	19	5	14	42	41	+1	62	Qualification to the 2018 CAF Champions League
3	Enyimba	38	18	7	13	43	28	+15	61	Qualification to the 2018 CAF Confederation Cup
4	Akwa United	38	17	9	12	46	30	+16	60	
5	Nasarawa United	38	16	8	14	35	30	+5	56	
6	El Kanemi Warriors	38	18	2	18	39	43	−4	56	
7	Lobi Stars	38	15	9	14	43	39	+4	54	
8	Kano Pillars	38	16	6	16	38	35	+3	54	
9	Ifeanyi Ubah	38	15	9	14	39	38	+1	54	
10	Sunshine Stars	38	17	3	18	41	43	−2	54	
11	Niger Tornadoes	38	16	6	16	31	35	−4	54	
12	Abia Warriors	38	15	8	15	44	36	+8	53	
13	Wikki Tourist	38	16	5	17	37	41	−4	53	
14	Enugu Rangers	38	14	11	13	39	44	−5	53	
15	Rivers United	38	14	10	14	34	33	+1	52	
16	Katsina United	38	15	7	16	37	38	−1	52	
17	Shooting Stars	38	13	11	14	32	38	−6	50	Relegation to the Nigeria National League
18	ABS	38	14	7	17	37	50	−13	49	Relegation to the Nigeria National League
19	Gombe United	38	11	10	17	32	49	−17	43	Relegation to the Nigeria National League
20	Remo Stars	38	7	8	23	27	49	−22	29	Relegation to the Nigeria National League

Updated to match(es) played on 9 September 2017. Source: NPFL.ng
Rules for classification: 1) points; 2) goal difference; 3) number of goals scored.
(C) Champions

== Season statistics ==
=== Goals ===
==== Top scorers ====
As of 10 May 2017

Rank	Player	Team	Goals
1	(Nigeria) Stephen Odey	MFM	14
2	(Nigeria) Abdullahi Ibrahim Alhassan	Akwa United	10
2	(Nigeria) Samuel Mathias	El Kanemi Warriors	10
3	(Nigeria) Sunday Adetunji	Abia Warriors	8
3	(Nigeria) Mfon Udoh	Enyimba	8
4	(Nigeria) Adamu Hassan	Nasarawa United	7
4	(Nigeria) Victor Mboama	Remo Stars	7
4	(Nigeria) Anthony Okpotu	Lobi Stars	7
5	(Nigeria) Godwin Obaje	Ifeanyi Ubah	6
6	(Nigeria) Prince Aggreh	Ifeanyi Ubah	5
6	(Nigeria) Kingsley Eduwo	Lobi Stars	5
6	(Nigeria) Daniel Etor	Enugu Rangers	5
6	(Nigeria) Sunday Faleye	Shooting Stars	5
6	(Nigeria) Austin Oladapo	Gombe United	5
6	(Nigeria) Sikiru Olatunbosun	MFM	5

==== Hat-tricks ====
Player	For	Against	Result	Date
Stephen Odey	MFM	Lobi Stars	4-0	22 January 2017
Reuben Bala	Plateau United	ABS	4-1	26 March 2017
Mu'azzam	Akwa United	Shooting Stars	4-2	2 April 2017
Anthony Okpotu	Lobi Stars	Sunshine Stars	3-1	19 April 2017

== Attendances ==
Rangers International drew the highest average home attendance in the NPFL.

#	Football club	Average attendance
1	Rangers International	14,651
2	Kano Pillars	12,418
3	Gombe United	4,087
4	Wikki Tourists	3,864
5	Plateau United	3,450
6	El-Kanemi Warriors	2,742
7	ABS FC	2,656
8	Sunshine Stars	1,824
9	MFM FC	1,654
10	FC Ifeanyi Ubah	1,446
11	Nasarawa United	1,364
12	Shooting Stars	1,206
13	Enyimba FC	696
14	Remo Stars	672
15	Katsina United	636
16	Abia Warriors	288
17	Lobi Stars	276
18	Akwa United	250
19	Niger Tornadoes	135
20	Rivers United	104
