= Chijioke Ejiogu =

Nigerian footballer (born 1984)

Personal information
- Date of birth: 22 November 1984 (age 41)
- Place of birth: Imo State, Nigeria
- Height: 1.80 m (5 ft 11 in)
- Position: Goalkeeper

Team information
- Current team: Heartland F.C.
- Number: 1

Senior career*
Years	Team	Apps	(Gls)
1999	Arugo F.C.		
2000–2003	Julius Berger FC	18	
2004–2008	Dolphins F.C.	29	
2008	Akwa United F.C. (loan)	14	
2008–2012	Enyimba	15	
2012	Heartland		
2012–2013	Sharks F.C.	8	
2014–2015	Enyimba	3	
2016–2017	Ifeanyi Ubah FC	13	
2018–	Heartland	17	

International career^{‡}
2004	Nigeria	1	
- * Club domestic league appearances and goals as of 26 June 2020 ‡ National team caps and goals as of 26 June 2020

Chijioke Ejiogu // (born 22 November 1984) is a Nigerian football goalkeeper, he plays for Heartland FC.

== Career ==
He began his career at Arugo F.C., he then played for Dolphins F.C. and Julius Berger FC. He was held in high regard by Dolphins F.C., with some considering him a hero. The players alongside Victor Babayaro (director of sport of Dolphins F.C.) allegedly collected money meant to be part payment of sign on fees as well as three months salary from Akwa United F.C. and then returned to Dolphins F.C. In August 2008, he briefly signed up for Heartland F.C. and later left the team and moved to Enyimba in September that year.He also played for Sharks F.C. and Ifeanyi Ubah FC. In 2018 he signed for Heartland.

He is renowned for his ability to stop penalty kicks, most memorably at the 2007 Nigerian FA Cup Final between Dolphins F.C. and Enugu Rangers where he stopped 4 penalty kicks at the penalty shoot-outs, also during Enyimba's CAF Confederation Cup penalty shoot-out in 2010 against DR Congo's AS Vita where he stopped three penalty kicks.

He is a highly decorated player in the Nigerian Professional Football League, winning the title once with Dolphins F.C. (2004) and twice with Enyimba (2010 and 2015).

He is also the most decorated player in the Nigerian FA Cup with seven winners' medals, with Julius Berger in 2002, Dolphins F.C. in 2004, 2006 and 2007, Enyimba in 2009 and 2014 and Heartland in 2012.

He was part of the Julius Berger side that played in the final of the now defunct CAF Cup Winners' Cup in 2003 and was also part of the Dolphins F.C. team that played in the final of the CAF Confederation Cup in 2005.

== Honours ==
=== Club ===
Julius Berger

- Nigerian FA Cup: 2002
- Nigerian Super Cup: 2002
- CAF Cup Winners' Cup: 2003, Runner-up

Dolphins

- Nigerian Professional Football League: 2004
- Nigerian FA Cup: 2004, 2006, 2007
- CAF Confederation Cup: 2005, Runner-up

Enyimba

- Nigerian Professional Football League: 2009–10, 2015
- Nigerian FA Cup: 2009, 2014
- Nigerian Super Cup: 2010

Ifeanyi Ubah

- NEROS Anambra FA Cup: 2017

Heartland

- Nigerian FA Cup: 2012
