= Silas Nwankwo =

Nigerian footballer (born 2003)

Personal information
- Date of birth: 12 December 2003 (age 22)
- Height: 1.83 m (6 ft 0 in)
- Position: Striker

Youth career
- De-Royal Academy

Senior career*
Years	Team	Apps	(Gls)
–2019	Crown FC		
2019–2020	Sunshine Stars	11	(2)
2020–2022	Nasarawa United	42	(20)
2022–2025	Mjällby	42	(9)
- * Club domestic league appearances and goals as of 13 November 2024

Silas Nwankwo (born 12 December 2003) is a Nigerian professional footballer who last played as a striker for Allsvenskan club Mjällby.

== Career ==
Nwankwo started his football career at De-Royal Football Academy in Lagos before moving to Crown FC and later Sunshine Stars in 2019. One year later, he went on to play for Nasarawa United in the NPFL making 35 appearances and scoring 19 goals in the 2020–21 season.

On 3 February 2022, Nwankwo signed a four-year contract with Swedish club Mjällby.

== Honours ==
Individual

- NPFL Eunisell Golden Boot: 2020–21
