= Tamarakuro Debekeme =

Nigerian footballer

Tammy Debekeme
Personal information
- Full name: Tamarakuro Debekeme
- Date of birth: 24 October 1990 (age 36)
- Place of birth: Bayelsa, Nigeria
- Height: 1.87 m (6 ft 1 1/2 in)
- Position: Midfielder

Team information
- Current team: Nasarawa United F.C.

Senior career*
Years	Team	Apps	(Gls)
2008–2009	Bayelsa United		
2009–2012	Warri Wolves		
2013–	Nasarawa United F.C.		
- * Club domestic league appearances and goals

Tamarakuro Debekeme (born 24 October 1990 in Bayelsa, Nigeria) is a footballer, who plays for Nasarawa United F.C.

== Career ==
Debekeme began his career with Bayelsa United, earning his first professional game on 17 November 2008 against Enyimba Aba and signed than in May 2009 for Warri Wolves. He moved to Nasarawa for the 2013 season.
