= Adewale Adeyinka =

Nigerian footballer (born 1996)

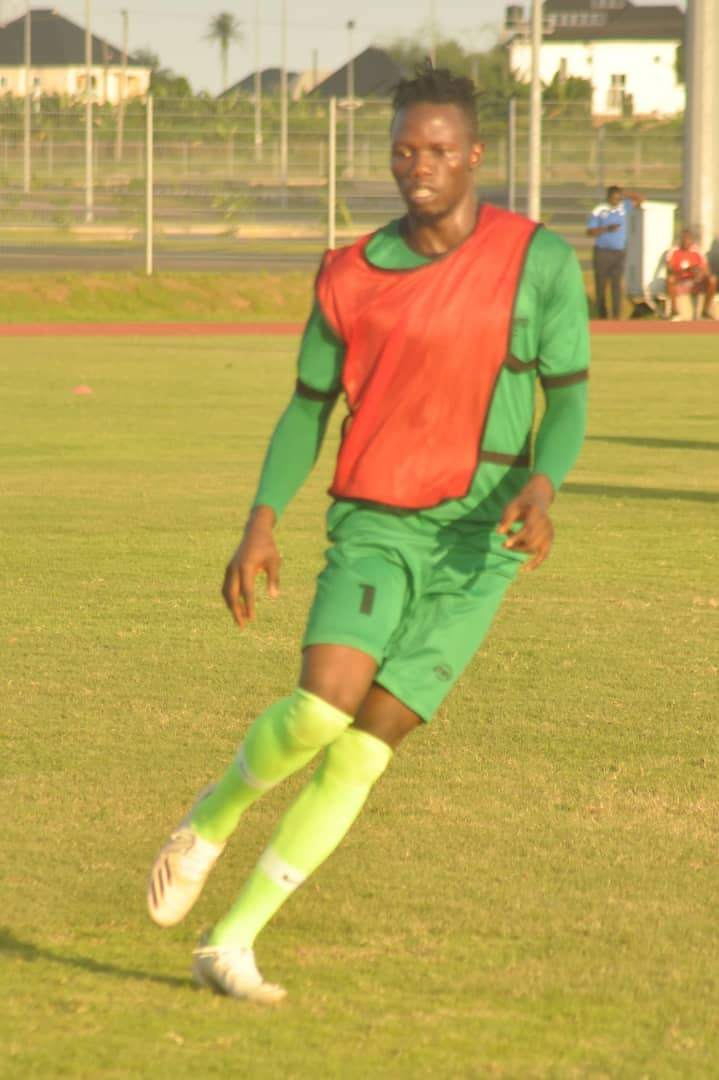
- Adeyinka training at Godswill Akpabio Stadium on 14 October 2021

Personal information
- Date of birth: 14 December 1996 (age 29)
- Place of birth: Offa, Nigeria
- Height: 1.86 m (6 ft 1 in)
- Position: Goalkeeper

Team information
- Current team: Kwara United
- Number: 1

Senior career*
Years	Team	Apps	(Gls)
2016–2017	Kwara United		
2017–2018	ABS FC		
2018–2019	Gombe United		
2019–2022	Akwa United		
2022–	Akwa United		
- * Club domestic league appearances and goals as of 17 September 2022 20:19 (UTC)

Adewale Adeyinka (born 14 December 1996) is a Nigerian professional footballer who plays as a goalkeeper for Akwa United and the Nigeria national team. He is a former Nigeria U17 team player.

Adeyinka won the Nigeria Professional Football League title with Akwa United in the 2020-21 season.

The Kwara native holds the record for most consecutive clean sheets in the Nigeria Professional Football League, after going 16 matches without conceding a goal in the 2020-21 season.

== Honours ==
=== Club ===
Akwa United

- Nigeria Professional Football League: 2020-21

=== Individual ===
- Most consecutive clean sheets in the Nigeria Professional Football League (16)
