= Fatai Osho =

Nigerian football manager

Personal information
- Place of birth: Nigeria

Managerial career
- Years: Team
- 2015: Remo Stars
- 2020 - 2021: Enyimba

Fatai Osho is a Nigerian football manager who is the current head coach of NPFL club Akwa United. He's known for his preferred 4-4-2 Diamond formation.

Osho has managed Kogi United, Supreme Court F.C., Rivers United, Enyimba and Remo Stars over the course of his career.

== Managerial career ==
Osho was appointed as Remo Stars FC coach in 2018, he guided the team to her first NPFL season, but got relegated after finishing at the bottom of the standing.

Osho guide Remo Stars back to the NPFL immediately after spending one season in the NPFL, he however resigned when Remo Stars appoints former Plateau Kennedy Boboye was appointed as the Technical consultant of Remo Stars and joins Enyimba fc as the assistant coah of the peoples elephant.

He was appointed as the interim coach of Enyimba following Usman Abdallah dismissal.

On 23 August 2023, Osho was appointed as Awka United Manager.
