= Chinedu Sunday Chukwu =

Nigerian professional footballer

Personal information
- Full name: Chinedu Sunday Chukwu
- Date of birth: 28 February 1997 (age 29)
- Place of birth: Nkanu East, Enugu State, Nigeria
- Height: 1.90 m (6 ft 3 in)
- Positions: Centre back; defensive midfielder

Team information
- Current team: Kano Pillars F.C.
- Number: 26

Senior career*
Years	Team	Apps	(Gls)
2013–2015	Abia Comets	32	(10)
2017–2018	Kwara United	23	(5)
2019-present	Kano Pillars F.C.	28	(6)
- * Club domestic league appearances and goals

Chinedu Sunday Chukwu (born 28 February 1997 in Nkanu East, Enugu State) is a Nigerian professional footballer who plays as a centre back for Kano Pillars F.C. in the Nigerian Professional Football League. He alternatively plays as defensive midfielder.

== Club career ==
=== Early career ===
Sunday Chukwu began his youth career with Abia Comets, where he played from 2013 to 2015.

=== Kwara United (2017–2018) ===
After an impressive two years at Abia Comets, In the 2017-2018 Nigerian Professional Football League season, he transferred to Kwara United of Ilorin, penning two-year contract with them where he played regularly during his debut season and made 23 match appearances with 5 goals.

=== Kano Pillars (2019–present) ===
On 1 January 2019 after rejecting many offers from clubs in the Nigerian Professional Football League, he signed with four times Nigerian Professional Football League champions Kano Pillars F.C. on a two-year contract.

== Career statistics ==
=== Club ===
Club	Season	League			Cup		Continental		Other		Total	
Club	Season	Division	Apps	Goals	Apps	Goals	Apps	Goals	Apps	Goals	Apps	Goals
Kano Pillars F.C.	2020	NPFL	28	6	0	0	–		0	0	28	6
Career total			28	6	0	0	0	0	0	0	28	6
