= Enyinnaya Godswill =

Nigerian footballer

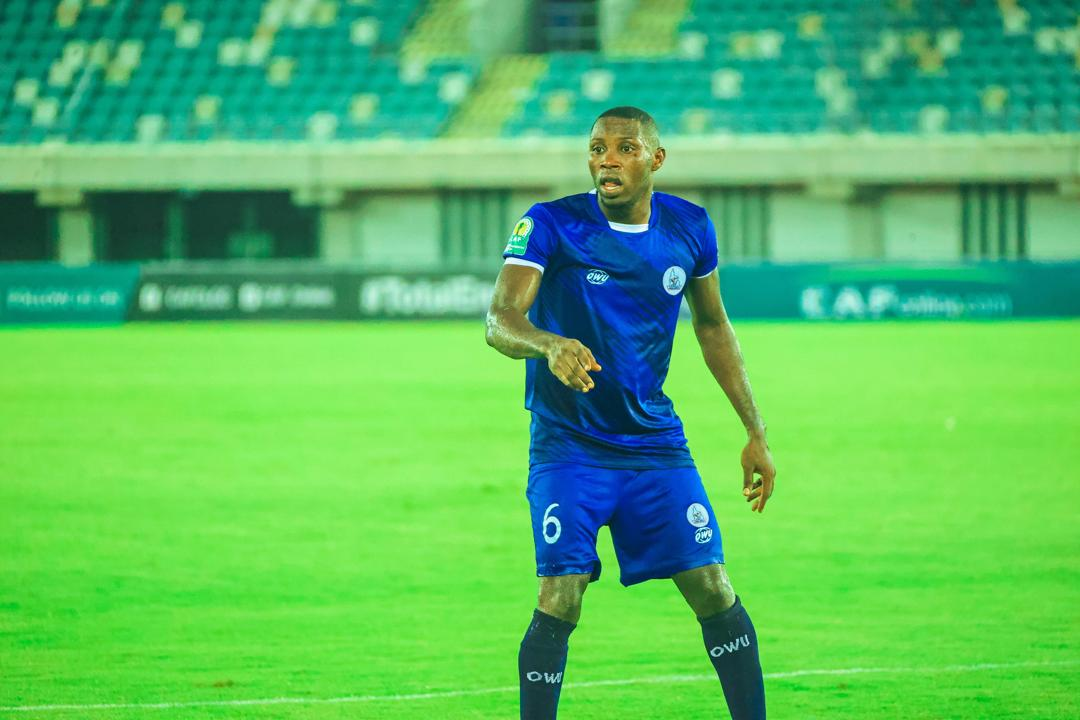
- Nigerian professional footballer, Enyinnaya Godswill during a CAF Confederation Cup match at Godswill Akpabio Stadium on March 3, 2024

Personal information
- Full name: Enyinnaya Kazie Godswill
- Date of birth: 12 April 1999 (age 27)
- Place of birth: Obingwa
- Height: 1.67 m (5 ft 6 in)
- Position: Right-back

Team information
- Current team: Stellenbosch F.C.
- Number: 6

Senior career*
| Years | Team | Apps | (Gls) |
| 2019 | Delta Force | 4 | (0) |
| 2019–2020 | Kwara United | 4 | (1) |
| 2020–2024 | Rivers United | 121 | (6) |
| 2024- | Stellenbosch | 43 | (1) |

International career^{‡}
| 2022– | Nigeria B | 1 | (0) |
- * Club domestic league appearances and goals as of 17 May 2026 ‡ National team caps and goals as of 17 July 2024

Enyinnaya Godswill (born 12 April 1999) is a Nigerian professional footballer who plays as a right-back for Premier Soccer League club Stellenbosch and the CHAN Eagles.

== International career ==
Godswill received his first call-up to CHAN Eagles for the two-legged 2022 CHAN Qualifiers against Ghana B team. He was not involved in the first leg, but started the reverse fixture, which was played at Moshood Abiola National Stadium on 3 September 2022.

In June 2021, he was named in the Nigeria squad for a friendly with Mexico.

== Honours ==
=== Club ===
==== Rivers United ====
- Nigeria Premier League: Winners 2021–2022
