= Charles Atshimene =

Nigerian footballer (born 2001)

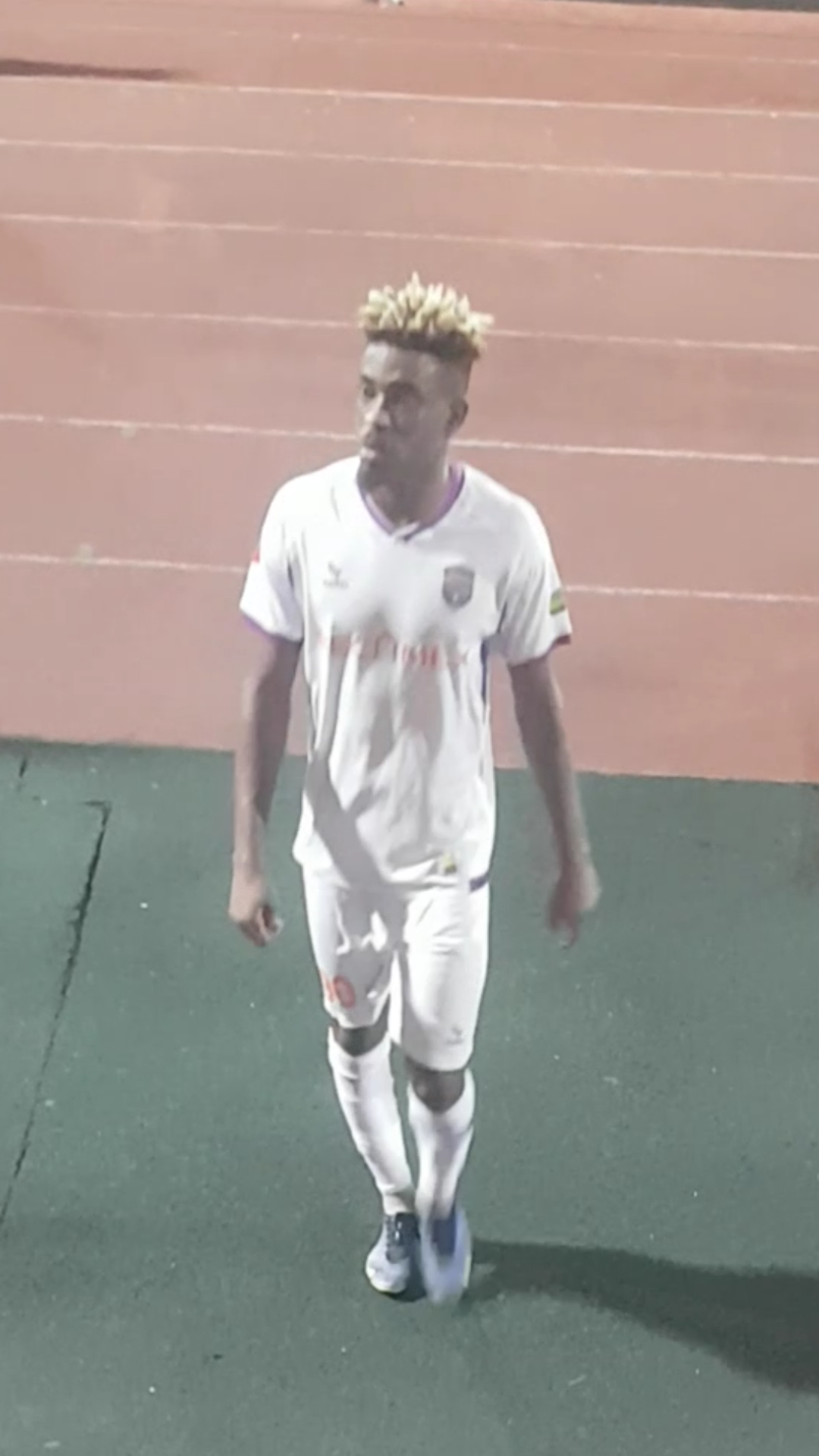

Personal information
- Date of birth: 5 February 2001 (age 25)
- Place of birth: Jega, Nigeria
- Height: 1.88 m (6 ft 2 in)
- Position: Forward

Team information
- Current team: Hong Linh Ha Tinh
- Number: 90

Senior career*
| Years | Team | Apps | (Gls) |
| 2019–2020 | Warri Wolves | 8 | (7) |
| 2021 | Akwa United | 26 | (19) |
| 2021–2022 | Feirense | 2 | (0) |
| 2022 | → Leixões (loan) | 9 | (2) |
| 2022–2024 | Bylis | 13 | (0) |
| 2024 | Becamex Binh Duong | 15 | (9) |
| 2024–2025 | Quang Nam | 24 | (11) |
| 2025– | Hong Linh Ha Tinh | 26 | (6) |

International career^{‡}
| 2021 | Nigeria | 1 | (0) |
- * Club domestic league appearances and goals as of 7 June 2026 ‡ National team caps and goals as of 14:44, 2 November 2021 (UTC)

Charles Atshimene (born 5 February 2001) is a Nigerian professional footballer who plays as a forward for V.League 1 club Hong Linh Ha Tinh.

== Career ==
On 27 February 2023, Atshimene joined V.League 1 side Becamex Binh Duong.

== Career statistics ==
=== Club ===
As of 30 June 2024.

| Club | Season | League | | | Cup | | Continental | | Other | | Total | |
| Club | Season | Division | Apps | Goals | Apps | Goals | Apps | Goals | Apps | Goals | Apps | Goals |
|---|---|---|---|---|---|---|---|---|---|---|---|---|
| Warri Wolves | 2019–20 | NPFL | 8 | 7 | 0 | 0 | — | | 0 | 0 | 8 | 7 |
| Akwa United | 2020–21 | NPFL | 26 | 19 | 0 | 0 | — | | 0 | 0 | 26 | 19 |
| Feirense | 2021–22 | Liga Portugal 2 | 2 | 0 | 2 (Note: Appearances in the Taça de Portugal) | 1 | — | | 0 | 0 | 4 | 1 |
| Leixões (loan) | 2021–22 | Liga Portugal 2 | 9 | 2 | 0 | 0 | — | | 0 | 0 | 9 | 2 |
| Bylis | 2022–23 | Kategoria Superiore | 12 | 0 | 2 | 2 | — | | 0 | 0 | 14 | 2 |
| Becamex Binh Duong | 2023–24 | V.League 1 | 15 | 9 | 1 | 0 | — | | 0 | 0 | 16 | 9 |
| Career total | | | 72 | 37 | 5 | 3 | 0 | 0 | 0 | 0 | 77 | 40 |

=== International ===
As of 2 November 2021.

Appearances and goals by national team and year
| National team | Year | Apps | Goals |
|---|---|---|---|
| Nigeria | 2021 | 1 | 0 |
| Total | | 1 | 0 |
