= Shehu Dikko =

Nigerian sports administrator

Chairman National Sports Commission
- Incumbent
- Assumed office 2024

Personal details
- Born: July 4th, 1970. Kaduna State

Shehu Dikko (born in Kaduna, Nigeria) is a Nigerian sports administrator and is the Chairman of National Sports Commission appointed by Bola Tinubu in October 2024. He held the Chairmanship of the League Management Company responsible for the management of the Nigerian Professional Football League. He was previously a consultant for the Nigerian House of Representatives on Sports committee. Ahead of the 2022 NFF Elections, Dikko has declared his intention to run for the presidency.

== Personal life and education ==
Dikko was born in Kaduna State, Nigeria. He attended Ahmadu Bello University where he studied Quantity Surveying and graduated with a BSc. He also did a post-graduate diploma in management from the same university. He subsequently obtained his Master of Business Administration from Ahmadu Bello University.

== Career ==
Shehu Dikko was before going into professional football administration was working in the private sector between 1991 and 2004. In 2004, when he went into football administration in Nigeria he started as the FIFA Goal Project Manager (Nigeria) with organizing several club tours between Portsmouth F.C. and Manchester United alongside Kano Pillars F.C. In 2008, Shehu Dikko was hired as a consultant for the sports committee in the Nigerian House of Representatives where he served till 2011. While he was a consultant for the government, he assisted in the drafting the National Sports Commission bill in the National Assembly. In 2012 he was appointed secretary of Super Eagles Bonus Row and code of conduct drafting till 2013. In September 2014, he ran for office of the NFF President but withdrew his candidacy before election was officially held.

On 26 December 2014, he was appointed Chairman of League Management Company by the Nigeria Football Federation.

On 4 April 2019 Shehu Dikko was reappointed Chairman of the League Management Company.

== Court order ==
On 19 April 2016, Dikko ordered the ban of Giwa F.C. after the team had allegedly broken several NPFL rules among the charges were the assault of match referee and other officials during a match. Following the ban, Giwa F.C. sued the LMC and Shehu Dikko to a Federal High court in Plateau State. On 16 August 2016 Shehu Dikko was ordered by the court to reinstate Giwa F.C. into the NPFL.

In September 2016, a Federal High court in Jos ordered the arrest of Dikko for failing to reinstate Giwa F.C. He was subsequently asked to appear before the court and when he failed to appear in court, the court ruled on two weeks imprisonment for Shehu Dikko.
