= Gabros Stadium =

Multi-use stadium in Nnewi, Nigeria

Coordinates: 5°58′49″N 6°54′7″E

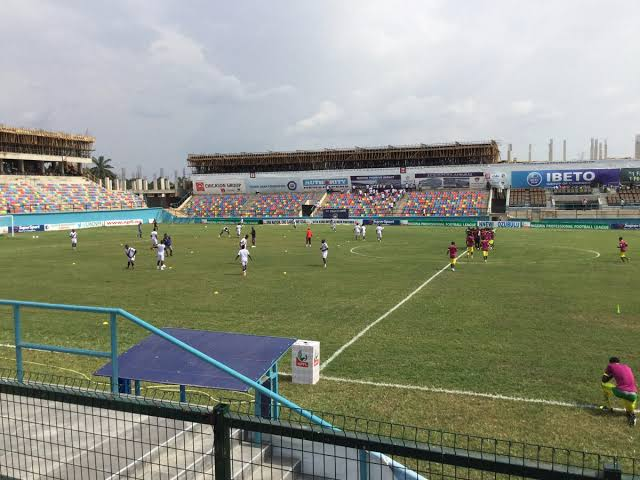
Gabros Stadium.jpg

Gabros Stadium is a 3,000-capacity multi-use stadium in Nnewi, Nigeria, adjacent to the Beverly Hills Hotel. It is the home stadium of Gabros International and Godosky FC and was the temporary home of Anambra United F.C.

== Controversy ==
The Gabros Football Club and its Stadium was later sold to Dr. Patrick Ifeanyi Ubah by Chief Gabriel Chukwuma. The stadium hosted the NFPL Week 10 football match. However, Chief Gabriel Chukwuma insisted that no such sale took place. He also claims that Dr. Patrick Ifeanyi Ubah only paid for the football club and not for the stadium as a different entity.

In December 2015, the High Court of the Federal Capital Territory (FCT) restrained Chief Gabriel Chukwuma from meddling with the rights of Dr. Patrick Ifeanyi Ubah and FC Ifeanyi Ubah to operate as a football club and participate in the Nigeria Professional Football League (NPFL), after the former claimed that he had taken control of the club and was making preparations to participate in the forthcoming season.
