= Jigawa Golden Stars F.C. =

Nigerian football club

Jigawa Golden Stars
- Full name: Jigawa Golden Stars Football Club
- Nickname: Badaru Boys
- Ground: Jigawa State Township Stadium; DUTSE
- Capacity: 15,000
- Manager: Dodo Isah
- League: Nigeria National League
- 2020–21: Nigeria Professional Football League, 18th of 20 (relegated)
Home colours	Away colours

Jigawa Golden Stars Football Club is a Nigerian football club. They play in the second level of professional football in Nigeria, the Nigeria National League. Until 2007 they played in the city of Kano. After promotion, the team then moved to play its home games in Zaria, Kaduna State because of interference from Kano officials and their ground in Dutse being under renovation until March 2008.

== Current squad ==
Note: Flags indicate national team as defined under FIFA eligibility rules; some limited exceptions apply. Players may hold more than one non-FIFA nationality.

No.	Pos.	Nation	Player
—	GK	NGA	Sulaiman Shuaibu
—	GK	NGA	Okani Chukwunonye
—	DF	NGA	Bala Mohammed
—	FW	NGA	Maurice Chigozie
—		NGA	Auwalu Gbade (Captain)
—		NGA	Mamuda Isa

No.	Pos.	Nation	Player
—		NGA	Pius Joseph
—		NGA	Abubakar Yahaya
—	FW	NGA	Ayinde Biodun Yusuf
—		NGA	Tijani Sulaiman
—		NGA	Oliver Ensidibe
—		NGA	Isa Jamiu
