= Godwin Obaje =

Nigerian footballer (born 1996)

Personal information
- Date of birth: 12 March 1996 (age 30)
- Place of birth: Kaduna, Nigeria
- Height: 1.88 m (6 ft 2 in)
- Position: Forward

Team information
- Current team: Enugu Rangers
- Number: 11

Senior career*
Years	Team	Apps	(Gls)
2014–2015	Wikki Tourists	19	(7)
2015	AS Trenčín	0	(0)
2016–2017	Wikki Tourists	32	(18)
2017–2018	Ifeanyi Ubah	41	(16)
2019	Plateau United	6	(1)
2019–2020	JSK (Kairouan)	10	(1)
2020–2022	Abia Warriors	63	(20)
2022	Sidama Coffee		
2023–2024	Enugu Rangers	42	(15)
2024	Oman Club	4	(0)
2024–	Enugu Rangers	25	(8)
- * Club domestic league appearances and goals as of 10:53, 20 July 2025 (UTC)

Godwin Obaje (born 12 March 1996) is a Nigerian professional footballer who plays as a forward for Enugu Rangers.

== Career ==
In 2015, Obaje signed for Slovak side Trenčín. He was the top scorer of the 2016 Nigeria Professional Football League with 18 goals. In 2016, he trialed for Spartak Moscow in the Russian top flight. In 2019, Obaje signed for JSK (Kairouan) in Tunisia. In 2020, he signed for Nigerian team Abia Warriors.
