= 2009–10 Nigeria Premier League =

Nigeria Premier League
- Season: 2009–2010
- Champions: Enyimba F.C.
- Relegated: Wikki Tourists; Bayelsa United; Gateway F.C. Ranchers Bees
- 2011 CAF Champions League: Enyimba; Kano Pillars
- 2011 CAF Confederation Cup: Sunshine Stars; Kaduna United (cup winner)
- Matches: 378
- Goals: 750 (1.98 per match)
- Top goalscorer: Ahmed Musa, K. Pillars (18)
- Biggest home win: Kwara United F.C. 6 Ranchers Bees 0 (June 13)
- Biggest away win: Shooting Stars 2 Ranchers Bees 0 (June 27)-Played in Minna per League Punishment
- Highest scoring: 7-Wikki Tourists 3 Kwara United 4 (Oct. 17),

The 2009–10 Nigeria Premier League was the 39th season of the competition since its inception. Starting on 20 September 2009, it ran to July 7 due to breaks for both the 2010 Africa Cup of Nations and the 2010 FIFA World Cup and a total of 378 of a possible 380 games played. It ran without a sponsor since January due to the pulling out of sponsor Globacom.

Locations of the Nigeria Premier League 2009–10 teams

== Table ==
Pos	Team	Pld	W	D	L	GF	GA	GD	Pts	Qualification or relegation
1	Enyimba (C)	38	20	10	8	43	25	+18	70	Qualification to 2011 CAF Champions League
2	Kano Pillars	38	19	9	10	48	29	+19	66	Qualification to 2011 CAF Champions League
3	Sunshine Stars	38	19	7	12	39	30	+9	64	Qualification to 2011 CAF Confederation Cup
4	Kwara United	38	18	6	14	43	34	+9	60	Qualification to 2011 WAFU Club Championship
5	Enugu Rangers	38	15	13	10	34	22	+12	58	Qualification to 2011 WAFU Club Championship
6	Warri Wolves	38	17	7	14	50	43	+7	58	
7	Niger Tornadoes	38	16	7	15	42	38	+4	55	
8	Heartland	38	16	6	16	37	33	+4	54	
9	Gombe United	38	16	4	18	34	33	+1	52	
10	Kaduna United	38	15	7	16	40	45	−5	52	Qualification to 2011 CAF Confederation Cup (Federation Cup winner)
11	Shooting Stars	38	14	10	14	27	33	−6	52	
12	Dolphins	38	13	12	13	39	39	0	51	
13	Lobi Stars	38	14	9	15	34	37	−3	51	
14	Ocean Boys	38	14	8	16	32	36	−4	50	
15	Zamfara United	38	13	10	15	30	46	−16	49	
16	Sharks	38	14	6	18	45	41	+4	48	
17	Wikki Tourists (R)	38	13	8	17	40	38	+2	47	Relegation to Nigeria National League
18	Bayelsa United FC (R)	38	13	8	17	40	46	−6	47	Relegation to Nigeria National League
19	Gateway F.C. (R)	38	11	7	20	33	46	−13	40	Relegation to Nigeria National League
20	Ranchers Bees (R)	38	10	6	22	23	59	−36	36	Relegation to Nigeria National League

(C) Champions; (R) Relegated
