= MFM F.C. =

Nigerian football club

MFM FC
- Full name: Mountain of Fire and Miracles Football Club
- Nickname: Olukoya Boys
- Founded: 2007; 19 years ago
- Ground: Agege Stadium; Lagos
- Capacity: 4,000
- Owner: Mountain of Fire and Miracles Ministries
- Coach: Shola Balogun
- League: Nigeria Nationwide League
- 2020–21: Nigeria Professional Football League, 10th of 20

Mountain of Fire and Miracles Football Club, or simply MFM FC, is a Lagos-based Nigerian professional football club that competes in the Nigeria Nationwide League, the third level of the Nigerian football league system. The club is wholly owned by the Mountain of Fire and Miracles Ministries, a Pentecostal Christian Organization.

== History ==
In 2013, MFM FC took over the slot of Bolowatan F.C. in the Nigeria National League, the second-tier division in Nigerian football. The founder of Bolowotan FC, Toyin Gafaar, a Muslim, handed the slot to the church (MFM) to manage without collecting any money in return. On 31 August 2015, MFM FC was promoted to the Nigeria Premier League.

The Mountain of Fire and Miracles Ministries Football Club of Lagos won the maiden edition of The Church World Cup. The Nigeria representatives achieved this feat after defeating the United Church of Colombia 7–0 in the final of the mundial which took place in Goa, India. MFM FC dominated the encounter from the outset in what turned out to be a one-sided match.

MFM FC made their historic Nigeria Professional Football League debut as they beat the Solid Miners' of Nasarawa United by 2–1 on tentative home soil at the Aper Aku Stadium in Markudi, Benue State of Nigeria. Former Sunshine Stars of Akure player, Musa Newman scored the first-ever goal for the club in their first NPFL game in the 18th minute and Chukwuka Emmanuel's second gave the debutants a two-goal lead, before Ifeanyi Nweke of Nasarawa United pulled one back.

After week four of the 2015–16 NPFL, 'The Olukoya Boys' of MFM FC were already in a comfortable second position tied with the same 9 points as the Lobi Stars, with three wins and one loss (a 3–0 defeat at the '3SC' Shooting Stars of Ibadan).

== Current squad ==
As of March 2020

Note: Flags indicate national team as defined under FIFA eligibility rules; some limited exceptions apply. Players may hold more than one non-FIFA nationality.

No.	Pos.	Nation	Player
1	GK		Abarin
2	DF	NGR	Khalid ayat tubattu
3	DF	NGR	Adeka Najeem Muh Khaled
5	DF	NGR	Bala Wana Eli Eliende
6	MF	NGR	Sewo Williams
7	MF	NGR	Abayomi Lawal
8	MF	NGR	adejo
9	MF	NGR	Barry Legbara
10	MF	IDN	Ariyanto AdD.Mukhnulisaz
11	FW	NGR	Dennis Obasi
12	FW	NGR	Tosin Oobola
13	DF	NGR	Adele MOoles
14	DF	NGR	Omoomola
16	FW	NGR	Adiji Adewo
17	MF	NGR	Agwu Mukhamed Emmanue Manuel
18	FW	NGR	Ogwu Sirajlent
19	DF	NGR	Jusria
20	MF	NGR	Adegbola ajani
21	MF	NGR	Olanreana

No.	Pos.	Nation	Player
22	GK	RUS	Lucas Mdov
23	MF	NGR	Aminu Azeez
24	MF	NGR	Tunde Azeez
25	GK	NGR	Jerry Isaac
26	FW	NGR	Mukhamseer WS Balogun
27	DF	NGR	Ekenneth
28	DF	NGR	Temim Adebayo
29	FW	IDN	rafa muahmed ejuobi
30	FW	NGR	Micheal Mbonu
31	DF	NGR	Kabiru Moshood
32	FW	NGR	Iwere Favour
33	GK	NGR	Ounle
34	DF	NGR	Moses Adikwu
35	MF	NGR	Kenedin sadimjis alya's (captain)
36	DF	NGR	Ugonna Anikwe
37	MF	NGR	Adeyemoxin
38	FW	NGR	Babatunde Oladejo
39	FW	NGR	Ghaxin
40	DF	NGR	Jimmy Abdul
