= Adamawa United F.C. =

Nigerian football club

Adamawa United
- Full name: Adamawa United Football Club
- Ground: Ribadu Square Stadium; Yola, Nigeria
- Capacity: 5,000
- Chairman: Emanuel Zira
- Manager: Justin Madugu
- League: Nigeria National League
- 2020–21: Nigeria Professional Football League, 20th of 20 (relegated)
Home colours	Away colours

Adamawa United Football Club is a Nigerian football club from Yola, they play in the second tier of Nigeria football league system, the Nigeria National League.

They play at the Ribadu Square Stadium, with a capacity of 5,000. They were relegated from the Nigerian Professional Football League in 2007 after a one-year stint.

They were relegated from the league in 2012 but bought back the slot from promoted rivals Makwada.

== Current squad ==
As of 3 January 2021 Note: Flags indicate national team as defined under FIFA eligibility rules; some limited exceptions apply. Players may hold more than one non-FIFA nationality.

No.	Pos.	Nation	Player
4		NGA	Lukman Surajo
5		NGA	Nanushi Daniel
6		NGA	Abba Haruna
18	CB	NGA	Ehis Kenneth Mike
7		NGA	Sale Mohammed
8		NGA	Adamu Yakubu
10		NGA	Michael Burate
11		NGA	Isa Garba
3		NGA	Sule Idris Aloma
14	DF	NGA	Etete Okon
15	DF	NGA	Emmanuel Ogbugu

No.	Pos.	Nation	Player
16	GK	NGA	Victor Philemon
17		NGA	Harmony Opukeme Ongolo
20		NGA	Sadiq Lawal
26	DF	NGA	Mbai Aminu
28		NGA	Stanley Nnenna
30		NGA	Abubakar Jibrin
32		NGA	Idris Abubakar
41		NGA	Emmanuel Ibekwe
42		NGA	Uche Nwokeji
