= Baldwin Bazuaye =

Retired Nigerian footballer

Personal information
- Full name: Baldwin Bazuaye
- Date of birth: 9 September 1968 (age 58)
- Place of birth: Benin city
- Position: Forward

Team information
- Current team: Kastina united

Senior career*
Years	Team	Apps	(Gls)
–1992	?		
1992–1993	Ethnikos Piraeus		
1993–1998	Concord		
1999–2001	Shooting Stars		

International career
1990–1997	Nigeria	7	(0)
- * Club domestic league appearances and goals

Baldwin Bazuaye (born 9 September 1965,Benin City) is a retired Nigerian international footballer, who played as a forward. He hails from Edo State. He was once a Bendel United F.C. coach and he later resigned. He is also related to Bazuaye Maxwell, Professor Godwin Nosa Bazuaye, Daddy Bazuaye and late chief Henry Bazuaye.

== Club career ==
Born in Nigeria, Bazuaye moved to play in the Greek second division at the age of 24, signing with Ethnikos Piraeus F.C.

Bazuaye would finish his playing career in Nigeria, playing for Concord F.C. and Shooting Stars F.C., helping the latter in their 1999 CAF Champions League campaign.

== Football career ==
Bazuaye was a member of Nigeria's squad which won the 1985 FIFA U-16 World Championship. He would also play for the senior Nigeria national football team and participated in the 1990 African Nations Cup finals. he later became a coach in Bendel Insurance F.C. and resigned.

== Managerial career ==
After his playing career ended, Bazuaye began coaching and took the helm of Lobi Stars F.C.
