= Usman Abd'Allah =

Association football coach (born 1974)

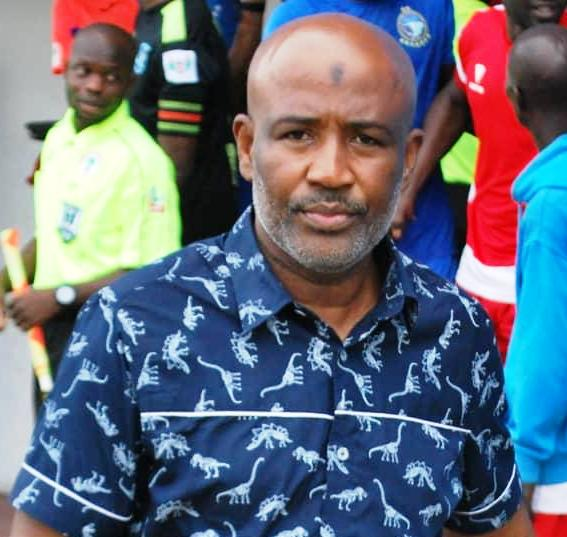
- Abd'Allah in 2019
- Born: July 16, 1974 (age 52); Kano, Kano State, Nigeria
- Other name: Shariff
- Occupation: Football coach
- Years active: 2006–present

Usman Abd'Allah (born 16 June 1974) is a Nigerian-French football coach. Abd'Allah is the head coach of Ranchers Bees.

== Early life ==
He was born in Kano State in northern Nigeria. He began at Tarauni Primary School and went on to Government Secondary School, Kazaure, before studying chemical engineering at Kaduna State Polytechnic where he graduated in 1989.

== Career ==
=== Player ===
His playing career spanned the continents of Africa, Asia and Europe. In Africa he turned out for various Nigerian Clubs, including Sanka Vipers of Kano; UNTL of Kaduna, Rocks of Kaduna, Stationery Stores of Lagos and Mogas 90 of Benin Republic. He played in the Kano State academic and festival teams in the 1980s and the national Under-20 and Under-23 teams along with his older brother – Hassan Abd'Allah.

In 1991, he moved to Al Arabic FC and Bayer Leverkusen. He moved to Singapore where he played for Jurong FC, Khalsa FC and Gombak United FC, while his odyssey in Asia also involved periods with top side Sheikh Russel in Bangladesh and Kalantan FC in Malaysia.

At the twilight of his playing career, he returned to France and starred for Bollene FC and also FC Sete. Abd'Allah stopped playing in 2006 while with a second division side in France.

=== Coach ===
He first coached in the French lower division for EPS FC, FC Sete, FC Frontignan and Bollene FC. He holds UEFA B Licence Certificate and a UEFA A Licence obtained in England. He attended several coaching courses, including CAF courses and Strength and Conditioning Level 1 Coaching Certificate in Australia. He has degrees in football coaching and team management at Le CREPS de Montpellier, France, National Coaching Accreditation Programme (NCAP) Level 1 from Singapore and the LaLiga Coaching Certificate.

He coached football club sides in Asia and France. He is the head coach and Technical Adviser at two time African Champions League winner Enyimba International FC. They hold eight Nigerian Professional Football League championships and four Federation Cups, Usman is currently the Third assistant of Nigeria super eagles.

Before joining Enyimba, he coached in Nigeria with Kano Pillars as an assistant coach and also oversaw the youth team of the club. He joined Enyimba initially as an assistant to Paul Aigbogun. He was later promoted to Head Coach and led the side to the semi-finals of the CAF Confederations Cup, losing to Raja Casablanca of Morocco.

He won the Nigeria Professional Football League title in 2018/19 season, finishing first ahead of his state club Kano Pillars.

Abdallah was appointed as Technical Adviser of Remo Stars in 2026 at the time the team was battling relegation

== Marriage and family ==
Usman Abd'Allah holds dual citizenship with both Nigeria and France. He is married to a French woman and together they have twin daughters. His family lives in France.
