= Lionel Soccoïa =

French professional football coach

Lionel Soccoïa is a French professional football coach. After a recent stint in South Africa, he is the coach of Kano Pillars in Nigeria.

== Professional coach career ==
Soccoïa had a long career as a professional club coach and sport director.

- 2004–2009: Rapid Omnisports de Menton, Menton (France)

Head coach of the professional team

- 2009–2011: Centre International de Formation Adjavon Sébastien, Djeffa (Benin)

Head coach of the professional team and technical director

- 2012–2013: Académie de Foot Amadou Diallo de Djékanou, Abidjan (Ivory Coast)

Head coach of the professional team

- 2013–2015: Centre de Formation de Mounana, Mounana (Gabon)

Head coach of the professional team

- 2015–2016: Coton Sport Football Club de Garoua, Garoua (Cameroon)

General Manager of the Professional Team

- 2017: Dubai Cultural Sports Club, Dubai (United Arab Emirates)

Head coach of the professional team

- 2018: African Lyon Football Club, Dar es Salaam (Tanzania)

Head coach of the professional team

- 2019: Black Leopards Football Club, Thohoyandou (South Africa)

Head coach of the professional team

- 2020–2021 : Kano Pillars Football Club (Nigeria)

Head coach of the professional team

- 2022–2023 : Stade Migoveen F.C. (Gabon)

Head coach of the professional team And Technical director

- 2023–2024 : Stade Migoveen F.C. (Gabon)

Head coach of the professional team And Technical director

== Honors ==
- French championship 6th Tier Champion 2003–2004
- Benin Second Division championship Champion 2009–2010
- Benin Premier League championship Vice Champion 2010–2011
- Winner of Gabonese Supercup 2013–2014
- Gabonese Premier League championship Vice Champion 2013–2014
- Winner of Gabonese cup 2014–2015
- UAE Second Division championship Champion 2017

== Qualifications ==
- UEFA B Coaching Diploma
- UEFA A Coaching Diploma
- CAF Coaching license workshop for clubs coaches Coupe confédération and Champions league
