= Ndifreke Udo =

Nigerian footballer

Ndifreke Effiong
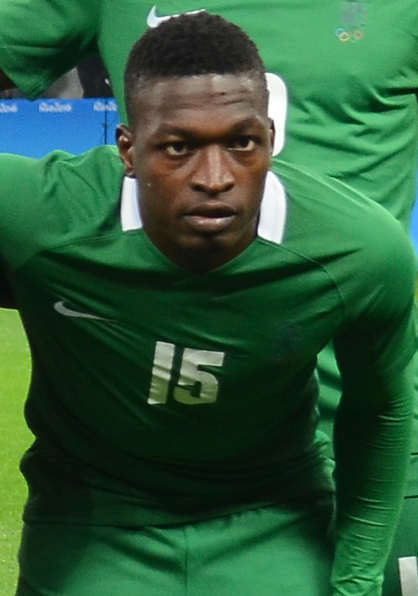

Personal information
- Full name: Ndifreke Udo Effiong
- Date of birth: 15 August 1998 (age 28)
- Height: 1.73 m (5 ft 8 in)
- Position: Forward

Team information
- Current team: Rivers United
- Number: 21

Senior career*
Years	Team	Apps	(Gls)
2015-2016	Abia Comets F.C.		
2016–2019	Abia Warriors	92	(40)
2019–2021	Akwa United	31	(17)
2021-2022	Ahli Benghazi	24	(11)
2022–2023	Akwa United		
2023	Al-Quwa Al-Jawiya	3	(3)
2023	Olympic Club Safi	4	(0)
2024	Al-Naft SC	3	(3)
2024–	Rivers United	1	(1)

International career^{‡}
2014	Nigeria Olympic	5	(0)
2015–2019	Nigeria U-23	9	(2)
2019-2022	Nigeria	1	(0)
Medal record
Olympic Games
Men's football
Representing Nigeria
Bronze medal – third place	2016 Rio de Janeiro	Team
Africa U-23 Cup of Nations
Winner	2015 Senegal
- * Club domestic league appearances and goals as of 8 October 2024 ‡ National team caps and goals as of 26 March 2019

Ndifreke Udo Effiong (born 15 August 1998) is a Nigerian footballer who plays for Rivers United.

== International ==
He has represented Nigeria at the 2015 African Games, 2015 Africa U-23 Cup of Nations and the 2016 Summer Olympics. He made his debut for the Nigeria national football team on 26 March 2019 in a friendly against Egypt, as a 90th-minute substitute for Shehu Abdullahi.

== Honours ==
Nigeria U23

- Olympic Bronze Medal: 2016
