= Israel Abia =

Nigerian footballer (born 1993)

Personal information
- Full name: Israel Abia
- Date of birth: 10 December 1993 (age 32)
- Place of birth: Enugu, Nigeria
- Height: 1.73 m (5 ft 8 in)
- Position: Forward

Team information
- Current team: Al-Rawdah
- Number: 26

Senior career*
Years	Team	Apps	(Gls)
2018	Sunshine Stars		
2019–2021	Enugu Rangers		
2021–2024	Al-Rawdah		
2024–2025	Al-Kawkab		
2025–	Al-Rawdah		
- * Club domestic league appearances and goals

Israel Abia (born 10 December 1993) is a Nigerian footballer who plays as a striker for Saudi Second Division club Al-Rawdah.

After joining Enugu Rangers from Sunshine Stars, Israel Abia was crucial for Enugu Rangers during the 2019–20 season and was the leading goalscorer at the inconclusive 2019–20 NPFL season. On 30 July 2021, Abia joined Saudi Arabian club Al-Rawdah. On 26 September 2025, Abia rejoined Al-Rawdah.
