= Eunisell =

Eunisell is the common name for Eunisell Operations in Nigeria, other operational countries are in Ghana and South Africa. The industrial company accounts for a large supply of additives, specialty fluids and key chemicals in Nigeria and some African countries.

== History ==
Eunisell started business in 1996 in Nigeria, dealing with the supply of key oil fields chemicals. Prior to the establishment of Eunisell, Nigeria like many African Countries depended solely on importation for their Chemicals for oil fields. The establishment of Eunisell and various other oil and gas companies in this sector of business has reduced tremendously the importation and increased the exportation of additives, specialty fluids and key chemicals.

In 2014, Eunisell completed the construction of the Central Processing Facility on Marginal Field for Network E&P on OML in Qua Iboe. Eunisell became the official shirt sponsor for Sharks F.C. Porthacourt in Nigeria in 2015.

== Structure ==
Eunisell operates as a Nigerian Operations Specialty fluid company in Nigeria—headquartered in Lagos—and also an active distributor of addictive in some African countries. Eunisell operates its distribution to Ghana and South Africa also.
