= Lafia Township Stadium =

Sports venue in Lafia, Nigeria

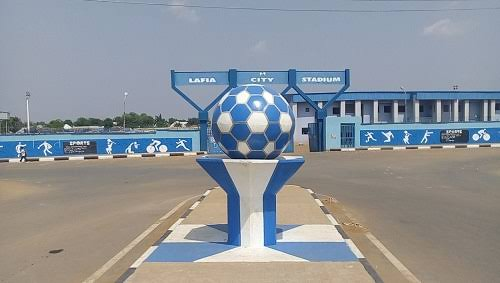
Lafia City Stadium gate

Lafia Township Stadium is a multi-use stadium in Lafia, Nasarawa State, central Nigeria. It is used mostly for football matches and is the home stadium of Nasarawa United. The stadium has a capacity of 10,000 people. It is in central Lafia City on Jos-Makurdi Road.
