= Aper Aku Stadium =

Sports venue in Makurdi, Nigeria

Coordinates: 7°43′53″N 8°31′14″E

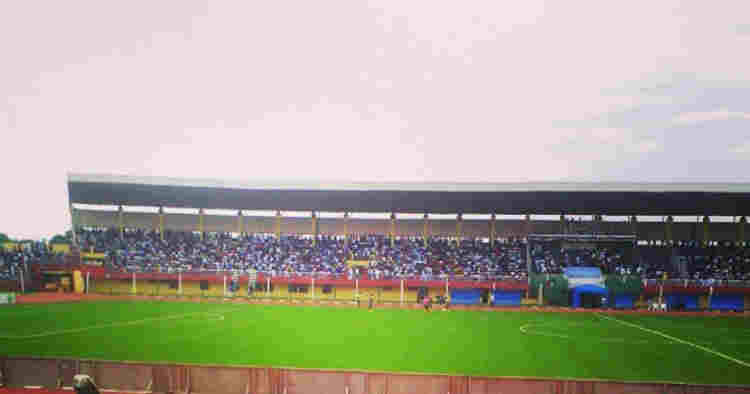
Home of Lobi Stars F.C.

Aper Aku Stadium is a multi-use stadium in Makurdi, Benue State, Nigeria. Construction of the stadium was initiated by the Second Republic governor Aper Aku. The 100% Natural Geo Technology Pitch was constructed by Monimichelle Sports Facility Construction Ltd.

It is currently used mostly for football matches and is the home stadium of the Lobi Stars. Aper Aku Stadium has a capacity of 8,000 people. It was renovated to host the 2007 Nigerian FA Cup final .
