= Ifeanyi Ubah F.C. =

Football club in Nigeria

FC Ifeanyi Ubah
- Full name: Football Club Ifeanyi Ubah
- Nicknames: Anambra Warriors, NPFL Galacticos
- Founded: 2015; 11 years ago
- Ground: FC Ifeanyi Ubah International Stadium; Ozubulu, Anambra, Nigeria
- Capacity: 18,000
- Chairman: Prince Chukwuma D. Ubah
- Manager: Uche Okagbue
- League: Nigeria National League
- 2020–21: Nigeria Professional Football League, 19th of 20 (relegated)
- Website: fcifeanyiubah.ng
Home colours	Away colours

FC Ifeanyi Ubah is a Nigerian football club formed following the acquisition of Gabros International Football Club by businessman Ifeanyi Ubah. The club was originally known as Iyayi Football Club of Benin City before being acquired by Gabriel Chukwuma and renamed Gabros International Football Club.

FC Ifeanyi Ubah has its headquarters at 21 Nnobi Road, Nnewi, Anambra State.

On 6 November 2016, the club defeated Nasarawa United FC on penalties to clinch a historic Federation Cup at Teslim Balogun Stadium, Lagos. Since the split of Anambra State in 1991, no football club from the State had ever won the trophy.

F.C. Ifeanyi Ubah is one of the few privately run football clubs in the country. The club has gained massive success as a newly formed club garnering droves of fans all around the south eastern part of Nigeria and around the country at large.

The media officer of the club is Engr Ikenna Nwokedi, while the stadium announcer is Josh Immanuel Ike-Okoli.

== Current (2016–17) squad ==
Note: Flags indicate national team as defined under FIFA eligibility rules; some limited exceptions apply. Players may hold more than one non-FIFA nationality.

No.	Pos.	Nation	Player
1	GK	NGR	Nwakanma Edwin Emeka
4	MF	NGR	Olamilekan Aniyikaye
5	MF	NGR	Onyekachi Akakem
7	FW	NGR	Okereke Maduabuchi
32	FW	NGR	Solomon Ovedje
8	FW	CMR	Medrano Tamen
9		GHA	Koffi Boakye
11	MF	NGR	Cyril Edum
12	GK	NGR	Uche Okafor
13	DF	NGR	Thompson Emmanuel
15	FW	BRA	William Silva
17	FW	NGR	Godwin Obaje
18	MF	NGR	Mohammed Suleiman

No.	Pos.	Nation	Player
20	DF	NGR	Chibuzor Okonkwo
21	GK	NGR	Ikechukwu Ezenwa
23	DF	NGR	Mbonu Ikechukwu
24		NGR	Andrew Adada
26	FW	CIV	Pascal Seka
30	FW	NGR	Onyedikachi Bright
29		NGR	Lukman Abdulkareem
31		NGR	Precious Omodu
34		CMR	Fabrice Ngoma
35	MF	MLI	Nico Dao
25	FW	NGR	Okoro Emmanuel

== Achievements ==
- Nigeria National League: 2014
- NEROS Anambra FA CUP: 2015, 2016, 2017, 2018
- Nigerian Federation Cup: 2016
