= Rivers United F.C. =

Nigerian football club

Rivers United
- Full name: Rivers Is .... Football Club
- Nickname: The Pride of Rivers
- Founded: 2016; 10 years ago
- Ground: Adokiye Amiesimaka Stadium; Port Harcourt, Rivers State, Nigeria
- Capacity: 38,000
- Manager: Finidi George
- League: Nigeria Professional Football League
- 2025–26: NPFL: 2nd of 20, Runners-up
Home colours

Rivers United Football Club Nigeria is a Nigerian professional football club based in Port Harcourt, Rivers State nigeria, that participates in the Nigerian Professional Football League, the highest level of domestic Nigerian football. The club was formed by the merger of Sharks F.C. and Dolphins F.C. in 2016. Their home stadium was the Yakubu Gowon Stadium, formerly Liberation Stadium, in Elekahia that has a seating capacity of 30,000. They moved to the Adokiye Amiesimaka Stadium in 2020. The stadium, renovated in 2020, has a capacity of 40,000. There is also a female team, Rivers Angels F.C., which is one of the best in Nigeria and Africa.

Rivers United FC has remained in the top flight since its first season. In the 2020-2021 CAF Confederation Cup season, Rivers defeated South African opponent Bloemfontein Celtic home and away to set up a highly anticipated matchup against neighbors Enyimba in the final qualifying round for a spot in the group stage. They lost the tie on penalties after a 1–1 aggregate scoreline

== History ==
Rivers United was founded in 2016 after the Rivers state government got permission to merge Dolphins FC and Sharks FC. Both clubs were run by the state government and were experiencing financial difficulty. Sharks were relegated to the First Division in 2015 while Dolphins had barely escaped relegation after drawing their final match. Rivers United's crest contains both a shark and a dolphin as a result of the merge.

Stanley Eguma was appointed coach and led them to a win in their first league match, 1–0 over Enyimba.

The club finished second in the 2016 Nigerian Premier League which qualified them for the 2017 CAF Champions League for the first time. A four-goal second-leg win over Mali's AS Bamako with Esosa Igbinoba and Bernard Ovoke each scoring a brace put Rivers past the preliminary round. However, they were eliminated by Sudan's Al-Merrikh 4–3 on aggregate in the first round after losing a 3–0 first round lead.

=== 2021–22: Nigerian Professional League Champions ===
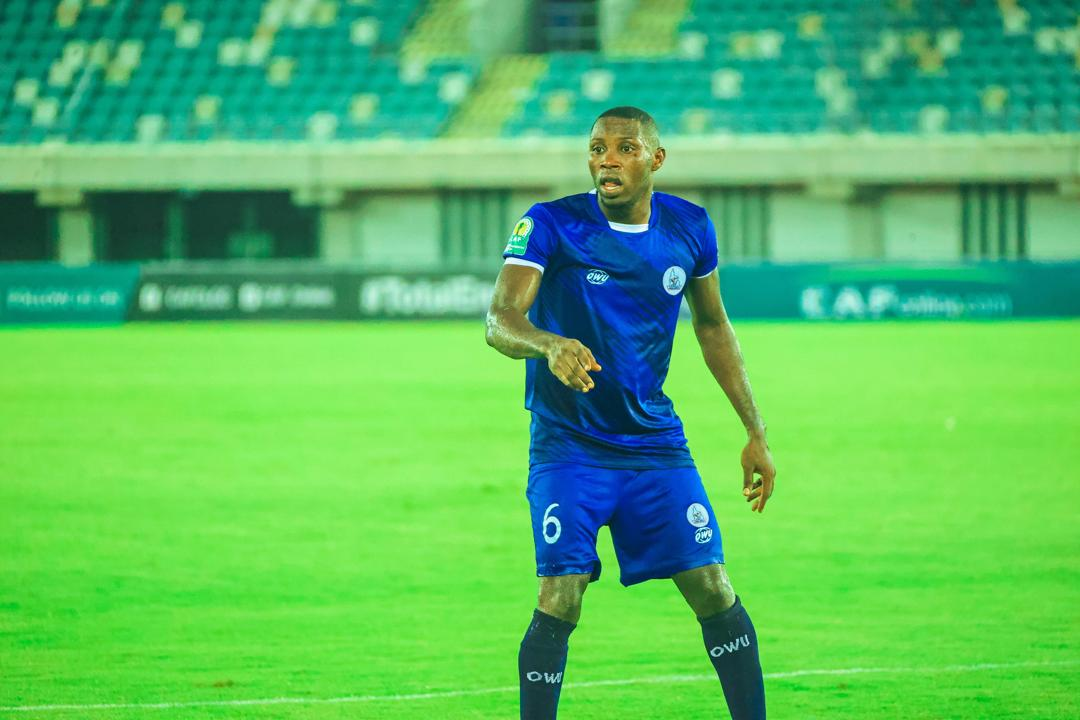
Enyinnaya Godswill in a jersey of Rivers United

On 25 June 2022, Rivers United won their first Nigeria Professional Football League title with four games to spare after Akwa United beat their nearest challengers, Plateau United 2–1 in Uyo.

Rivers United ended the season with 77 points, breaking the league record of 73 points in a season.

The 2021–22 Nigeria Professional Football League title is their first league title since the merger between Dolphins and Sharks FC of Port Harcourt in 2016. It is also the first NPFL title by a Rivers-based side since the Dolphins won in 2011.

Rivers United won 23 games, drew 8, and lost 7 of their 38 league games as they claimed the 2021-22 league title with 10 points ahead of their closest rivals, Plateau United.

Rivers united players and officials were awarded $20,000 each by the Rivers state government for their league triumph in 2022 and were promised another US$40,000 if they qualify for the 2022-2023 Caf champions league group stage.

== Honours ==
=== Domestic ===
- Nigerian Professional Football League
  - Champions (1): 2021–22
  - Runners-up (3): 2016, 2024–25, 2025–26
  - Third Place: 2022–23

== Performance in CAF competitions ==
- CAF Champions League: 3 appearances

2017 – First Round
2022 – second Round
2022–23 – Second Round

- CAF Confederation Cup: 4 appearances

2017 – Group stage
2020–21 – Play-off round
2021–22 – Play-off round
2022–23 – Quarter Finals

== Staff ==
Head coach

- (Nigeria) Finidi George

Assistant coach

- (Nigeria) Fatai Osho

Acting General Manager

- Okey Kpalukwu

Welfare Secretary

- Albert Chinwo

Media officer

- Mayuku Charles

== Current squad ==
Updated 8 February 2024

Note: Flags indicate national team as defined under FIFA eligibility rules; some limited exceptions apply. Players may hold more than one non-FIFA nationality.

No.	Pos.	Nation	Player
2	DF	NGR	Muyiwa Fehintola
3	DF	GHA	Emmanuel Ampiah
4	DF	NGR	John Uche Akubueze
5	DF	NGR	Ebedebiri Endurance
7	FW	NGR	Suleiman Abba
8	MF	NGR	Ukeme Williams
9	FW	LBR	Mark Gibson
10	FW	NGR	Alex Oyowah
11	MF	NGR	Shedrack Asiegbu
12	FW	LBR	Albert Korvah
14	MF	NGR	Paul Onobi
16	GK	NGR	Victor Soshima
17	MF	GHA	Farouk Mohammed

No.	Pos.	Nation	Player
19	DF	NGR	Paul Odeh
23	MF	GHA	Paul Acquah
25	MF	NGR	Augustine Okejepha
26	FW	CIV	Bernard Yao Kouassi
27	FW	GHA	Samuel Antwi
28	FW	NGR	Nwangwa Nyima (Captain)
29	FW	NGR	Ossy Martins
30	FW	NGR	Chibuzor Ezeh
31	DF	NGR	Azeez Godswill
32	FW	NGR	Andy Okpe
33	DF	NGR	Temple Emekayi
34	GK	NGR	Osagie Onisodumeya

== Rivers Angels ==
Further information: Rivers Angels F.C.

Rivers Angels F.C. (formerly Larry Angels F.C.) is a Nigerian professional football club based in Port Harcourt, Rivers State. They play in the Nigeria Women Premier League, the top flight division in the female soccer league system in Nigeria.
