= Nasarawa United F.C. =

- Full name: Nasarawa United Football Club
- Nickname: Solid Miners
- Founded: 2003
- Ground: Lafia Township Stadium, Lafia, Nasarawa, Nigeria
- Capacity: 10,000
- Chairman: Isaac Danladi
- Manager: Mohammed Baba Ganaru
- League: Nigeria Premier Football League
- 2025–26: 6th
Home colours	Away colours

Nasarawa United Football Club is a football club based in Lafia, Nasarawa, Nigeria. They play in the Nigeria Premier League.

== History ==
The team was founded in 2003 after the Nasarawa government took over Black Stars FC of Gombe. They joined the Nigerian Premier League in 2004–05. Their stadium, Lafia Township Stadium, has a capacity of some 5,000spectators. The club's nickname is Solid Miners.

== 2009–10 seasons ==
The team went through financial shortfalls in the 2008–09 season that one player described as leaving them on the verge of "starvation". A 1–1 home draw on March 7 against Niger Tornadoes caused home fans to riot and even follow the Tornadoes to the hotel and attack them there. The team was sent to play in Ibadan for the rest of the season and assured relegation to the Nigeria National League with three games remaining. The resulting debt of 46 million naira (Approx. $300,000) threatened to cancel the team's 2009–10 season. Midway through the season, the debt was reportedly 58 million naira ($387,000) and the team missed 16 games due to its precarious financial position. They returned to the field April 24 after a five-month suspension was lifted with a 1–0 win over Mighty Jets. They were promoted back to the Premier League in 2012 after winning their division.

== Achievements ==
- Professional Second Division: 1

2004

== Current team ==
As of 12 February 2023

Note: Flags indicate national team as defined under FIFA eligibility rules; some limited exceptions apply. Players may hold more than one non-FIFA nationality.

No.	Pos.	Nation	Player
1	GK	NGR	Yinka David
3	MF	NGR	Godwin Alex (captain)
9	FW	NGR	Ohanachom Chinedu
10	MF	NGR	Maigishiri Dauda
11	DF	NGR	Madaki Chris
12	GK	NGR	Danlami Umar
13	FW	NGR	Osanga King
14	MF	NGR	Yusuf Anas
15	DF	NGR	Ugochukwu Gabriel

No.	Pos.	Nation	Player
16	DF	NGR	Manga Mohammed
18	FW	NGR	Ogbole Emmanuel
20	FW	NGR	Offor Ikenna
25	GK	NGR	Isaac Jerry
27	DF	NGR	Denis Victor
30	FW	NGR	Obasi Dennis
34	GK	NGR	Godwin Ameh

== Performance in CAF competitions ==
- CAF Champions League: 1 appearance

2007 – Second Round

- CAF Confederation Cup: 2 appearances

2007 – Intermediate Round
2016 – First Round

== Management ==
Technical Advisor

- Kabiru Sulaiman Dogo

Head coach

- none

Assistant coach

- TBA

== Former coaches ==
- (Nigeria) Daniel Amokachi (2006)
- Bitrus Bewarang
- Zachary Baraje (2004–2007)
- (Denmark) Flemming Serritslev (2008–2009)
- Muhammad Babaganaru (2013–2005)
