= Nigeria Premier Football League =

Nigerian association football league

EuroMatch Premier Football League
- Founded: 1972; 54 years ago
- Country: Nigeria
- Confederation: CAF
- Number of clubs: 20
- Level on pyramid: 1
- Relegation to: Nigeria National League
- Domestic cup(s): Nigeria Federation Cup; Nigerian Super Cup
- International cup(s): Champions League; Confederation Cup
- Current champions: Enugu Rangers (9th title)
- Most championships: Enugu Rangers & Enyimba (9 titles each)
- Most appearances: Rabiu Ali (407+)
- Broadcasters: AfroSoccer (Direct to home and free-to-air); YouTube (Streaming producers for NPFL); Murphy Ben International
- Website: npfl.com.ng
- Current: 2026–27 Nigeria Premier Football League

The Nigeria Premier Football League (NPFL) also known as the EuroMatch Premier Football League for sponsorship reasons and (formerly the Nigeria Professional Football League) is the highest level of club football in Nigerian football league system. It is organized by the Nigeria Premier Football League (NPFL) Board under the authority of the Nigeria Football Federation. It has been organised since 1972. It is fed into by the Nigeria National League (NNL).

The NPFL runs from August to May, with each of the 20 teams playing 38 matches (facing every other team twice, once at home and once away), totaling 380 matches per season. Most games are scheduled for Sunday afternoons, while others are played on Saturday or weekday evenings.

The current champions are Enugu Rangers, who won their 9th title in the 2025–26 season.

== Name history ==
The league was previously known as the Nigeria Premier League between 1993 and 2000, and between 2003 and 2013.

It has also been known as the "Nigerian Premiership" (2000–2003); "Nigerian Professional League" (1990–1993); Nigerian National League - First Division (1979–1990) and "the (Nigerian) National League" or "Nigerian Football League" (1972–1979) and more recently "Nigeria Professional Football League" (2014–2023).

== International partnerships ==
On 27 April 2016, The Liga Nacional de Fútbol Profesional, organisers of the La Liga sealed a five-year memorandum of understanding deal with the NPFL on capacity building and idea exchange signed by the League Management Company chairman, Shehu Dikko and the La Liga President Javier Tebas. The NPFL and La Liga partnership has already started bearing fruit as during the January transfer window, Super Eagles fringe player Ezekiel Bassey was signed on loan from Enyimba to Barcelona B on a six-month deal with an option of 3-years come end of the season based on performance. The NPFL AllStars (made up of the league's best players) have also been playing Pre-Season as well as Winter break friendlies with top flight Spanish sides like Atlético Madrid, Málaga, Valencia, Villarreal, etc. In an effort to expose and test local players against top players and sides.

On Thursday, 25 May 2017, The Nigerian Football Federation (NFF) alongside the League Management Company (LMC), also consummated a multi-faceted strategic agreement in general football development with the Football Federation and Premier League body of the Kingdom of Morocco, NFF President Amaju Pinnick and NFF 2nd Vice-president/ LMC Chairman Shehu Dikko put pen to paper on a memorandum of understanding with their Moroccan counterparts, the result of detailed discussions, deliberations and considerations over time. The two FA Presidents signed their own sides in the Office of the Federation Royale Marocaine de Football in Rabat, while the LMC 's Chairman, Shehu Dikko and Chairman of the Ligue Nationale de Football Professionnel (which organises the Botola), Said Naciri signed at the LNFP office, watched by the two FA bosses.

Eunisell, Bet9ja and Hero lager are current sponsors of the NPFL.

== History ==
=== 2017 season ===
Plateau United F.C. won the league on 9 September 2017, with a 2–0 victory over Enugu Rangers.

=== 2018 season ===
In July 2018 the league was postponed indefinitely following crisis in the Nigerian Football Federation (NFF). Lobi Stars was declared as the sole representative of the league in the 2019 CAF Champions League as the team was at the top of the standings.

=== 2019 season ===
The league consisted of 24 teams. Four were promoted from the Nigeria National League. Twenty teams remained from the previous season which was not completed. They were divided into two groups of 12 teams. The top three teams in each group contested for the title in the NPFL Super six championship playoff in Lagos. The People's Elephant finished at the top of the log with 12 points from five games.

Enyimba vs Kano Pillars is considered the biggest match of the season because of their rivalry and they remain the 2 teams yet to finish outside the top eight for 12 consecutive seasons.

== Management ==
The League Management Company (shortly and commonly known as the 'LMC') is the legal association football League governing body of the Nigeria Professional Football League. It was created and incorporated by the Nigeria Football Federation in 2012 to take over the nearly-collapsed Nigeria Football League (NFL), the former league governing body.

=== History ===
The NFF created the Nigeria Premier League, organized by the Nigeria Football League in 1990 as a step in attaining full professionalism as the sole regulatory for football in Nigeria. At the Onikan Stadium on 12 May 1990, the league was given a name as it was then known as the 'Professional League'.

However, in November 2012 with the agreement and support of the National Sports Commission, Nigeria's sports regulatory authority, the NFF constituted an Interim Management Committee (IMC) for the League as part of measures to avert a total collapse of the top tier professional League following the downfall of the Nigeria Football League (NFL) which arose from difficult legal and administrative impediments. The IMC supervised the formation and incorporation of the LMC to run a transparent and commercially viable professional league.

=== Achievements ===
The first step the LMC took was to rebrand the League name, from the Nigerian Premier League to the Nigeria Professional Football League (NPFL), or simply the Professional 'Football' League) Also, the LMC signed a $34m TV rights deal to broadcast league matches which lasted until 2017.

In 2015, the League Management Company solicited financial support from the Government in order to upgrade existing grounds, provision of required broadcast and medical equipment and facilities in the stadiums.

The League Management Company has its framework and rules governing the 20 clubs in the Nigeria Professional Football League each season. On 5 July 2016, the NPFL adopted the TMS Domestic Transfer Matching System (DTMS), becoming the first league in Africa to do so.

The League Management Company is currently headed by Shehu Dikko.

== Awards ==
In 2012, the NPFL was ranked as the best in Africa and 24th best in the world by the IFFHS, the rating puts it a spot above the Scottish Premier League for the year.

The League Bloggers Awards celebrate players, coaches and administrators.

== Qualification for CAF competitions ==
=== Association Ranking for the 2023–24 CAF club season ===
The association ranking for the 2023–24 CAF Champions League and the 2023–24 CAF Confederation Cup will be based on results from each CAF club competition from 2018–19 to the 2022–23 season. The standings below are as of 21 March 2023.

Legend

- CL: CAF Champions League
- CC: CAF Confederation Cup
- ≥: Associations points might increase on basis of its clubs performance in 2022-23 CAF club competitions
- Associations ranked 1–12 are eligible to enter two teams in each CAF club competition.

Rank			Association	2018–19 (× 1)		2019–20 (× 2)		2020–21 (× 3)		2021–22 (× 4)		2022-23 (× 5)		Total
2023	2022	Mvt	Association	CL	CC	CL	CC	CL	CC	CL	CC	CL	CC	Total
1	1	—	Morocco	5	7	8	8	4	6	9	5	≥8	2	≥180
2	2	—	Egypt	4	5	11	6	8	3	7	4	≥7	2.5	≥167.5
3	3	—	Algeria	5	1	3	1	6	5	7	1	6	5	134
4	5	+1	South Africa	6	0	3	0.5	8	2	5	4	4	3	114
5	4	-1	Tunisia	8	6	6	0	4	3	5	1	4	2	101
6	11	+5	Tanzania	3	0	0	0	3	0.5	0	2	3	4	56.5
7	6	-1	DR Congo	5	0	4	1	4	0	0	3	1	2	54
8	7	-1	Angola	0	0.5	4	0	1	0	5	0	2	0	41.5
9	8	-1	Sudan	0	2	2	0	2	0	3	0	3	0	39
10	10	—	Guinea	3	0	0	3	2	0	1	0	2	0	29
11	9	-2	Libya	0	0	0	2	0	0.5	0	5	0	0.5	28
12	12	—	Nigeria	2	1	0	3	0	2	0	0	0	2	25
13	16	+3	Ivory Coast	1	0	0	0.5	0	0	0	1	0	3	21
14	14	—	Cameroon	0	0	0	0	0	3	0	0.5	1	0	16
15	13	-2	Zambia	0	2.5	1	2	0	1.5	0	0.5	0	0	15
16	17	+1	Congo	0	0.5	0	0	0	0	0	1	0	1	9.5
17	15	-2	Senegal	0	0	0	0	1	2	0	0	0	0	9
18	21	+3	Mali	0	0	0	1	0	0	0	0	0	1	7
19	30	+11	Togo	0	0	0	0	0	0	0	0	0	1	5
19	26	+7	Uganda	0	0	0	0	0	0	0	0	1	0	5
21	18	-3	Botswana	0	0	0	0	0	0	1	0	0	0	4
22	19	-3	Zimbabwe	1	0	1	0	0	0	0	0	0	0	3
23	19	-4	Kenya	0	2	0	0	0	0	0	0	0	0	2
23	21	-2	Eswatini	0	0	0	0	0	0	0	0.5	0	0	2
23	23	—	Burkina Faso	0	0.5	0	0	0	0.5	0	0	0	0	2
23	24	+1	Niger	0	0	0	0	0	0	0	0.5	0	0	2
27	24	-3	Ghana	0	1	0	0	0	0	0	0	0	0	1
27	27	—	Mauritania	0	0	0	0.5	0	0	0	0	0	0	1
27	27	—	Benin	0	0	0	0.5	0	0	0	0	0	0	1

=== Association ranking for the 2024–25 CAF club season ===
The association ranking for the 2024–25 CAF Champions League and the 2024–25 CAF Confederation Cup is be based on results from each CAF club competition from 2019–20 to the 2023–24 season.

Legend

- CL: CAF Champions League
- CC: CAF Confederation Cup
- ≥: Associations points might increase on basis of its clubs performance in 2023–24 CAF club competitions
- Associations ranked 1–12 are eligible to enter two teams in each CAF club competition.

Rank			Association	2019–20 (× 1)		2020–21 (× 2)		2021–22 (× 3)		2022–23 (× 4)		2023–24 (× 5)		Total
2024	2023	Mvt	Association	CL	CC	CL	CC	CL	CC	CL	CC	CL	CC	Total
1	2	+1	Egypt	11	6	8	3	7	4	8	2.5	7	7	184
2	1	-1	Morocco	8	8	4	6	9	5	8	2	2	4	148
3	3	—	Algeria	3	1	6	5	7	1	6	5	2	3	119
4	4	—	South Africa	3	0.5	8	2	5	4	4	3	4	1.5	106
5	5	—	Tunisia	6	0	4	3	5	1	4	2	6	1	97
6	6	—	Tanzania	0	0	3	0.5	0	2	3	4	6	0	71
7	7	—	DR Congo	4	1	4	0	0	3	1	2	4	0	54
8	8	—	Angola	4	0	1	0	5	0	2	0	3	1.5	51.5
9	9	—	Sudan	2	0	2	0	3	0	3	0	2	0	37
10	11	+1	Libya	0	2	0	0.5	0	5	0	0.5	0	3	35
11	13	+2	Ivory Coast	0	0.5	0	0	0	1	0	3	3	0	30.5
12	12	—	Nigeria	0	3	0	2	0	0	0	2	0	2	25
13	10	-3	Guinea	0	3	2	0	1	0	2	0	0	0.5	20.5
14	27	+13	Ghana	0	0	0	0	0	0	0	0	1	3	20
15	18	+3	Mali	0	1	0	0	0	0	0	1	0	2	15
16	14	-2	Cameroon	0	0	0	3	0	0.5	1	0	0	0	11.5
17	27	+10	Mauritania	0	0.5	0	0	0	0	0	0	2	0	10.5
18	16	-2	Congo	0	0	0	0	0	1	0	1	0	0.5	9.5
19	21	+2	Botswana	0	0	0	0	1	0	0	0	1	0	8
20	15	-5	Zambia	1	2	0	1.5	0	0.5	0	0	0	0	7.5
21	17	-4	Senegal	0	0	1	2	0	0	0	0	0	0	6
22	19	-3	Togo	0	0	0	0	0	0	0	1	0	0	4
22	19	-3	Uganda	0	0	0	0	0	0	1	0	0	0	4
24	23	-1	Eswatini	0	0	0	0	0	0.5	0	0	0	0	1.5
24	23	-1	Niger	0	0	0	0	0	0.5	0	0	0	0	1.5
26	22	-4	Zimbabwe	1	0	0	0	0	0	0	0	0	0	1
26	23	-3	Burkina Faso	0	0	0	0.5	0	0	0	0	0	0	1
28	27	-1	Benin	0	0.5	0	0	0	0	0	0	0	0	0.5

=== Association ranking for the 2025–26 CAF club season ===
The association ranking for the 2025–26 CAF Champions League and the 2025–26 CAF Confederation Cup will be based on results from each CAF club competition from 2020–21 to the 2024–25 season.

Legend

- CL: CAF Champions League
- CC: CAF Confederation Cup
- ≥: Associations points might increase on basis of its clubs performance in 2024–25 CAF club competitions
- Associations ranked 1–12 are eligible to enter two teams in each CAF club competition.

Rank			Association	2020–21 (× 1)		2021–22 (× 2)		2022–23 (× 3)		2023–24 (× 4)		2024–25 (× 5)		Total
2025	2024	Mvt	Association	CL	CC	CL	CC	CL	CC	CL	CC	CL	CC	Total
1	1	—	Egypt	8	3	7	4	8	2.5	7	7	10	4	190.5
2	2	—	Morocco	4	6	9	5	8	2	2	4	5	5	142
3	4	+1	South Africa	8	2	5	4	4	3	4	1.5	9	3	131
4	3	-1	Algeria	6	5	7	1	6	5	2	3	5	5	130
5	6	+1	Tanzania	3	0.5	0	2	3	4	6	0	2	4	82.5
6	5	-1	Tunisia	4	3	5	1	4	2	6	1	3	0.5	82.5
7	8	+1	Angola	1	0	5	0	2	0	3	1.5	2	2	55
8	7	-1	DR Congo	4	0	0	3	1	2	4	0	2	0	45
9	9	—	Sudan	3	0	3	0	3	0	2	0	3	0	41
10	11	+1	Ivory Coast	0	0	0	1	0	3	3	0	1	2	38
11	10	-1	Libya	0	0.5	0	5	0	0.5	0	3	0	0	24
12	12	—	Nigeria	0	2	0	0	0	2	0	2	0	1	21

== Past champions ==
=== Champions by season ===
Année	Champion
1972	Mighty Jets (1)
1973	Bendel Insurance (1)
1974	Enugu Rangers (1)
1975	Enugu Rangers (2)
1976	Shooting Stars (1)
1977	Enugu Rangers (3)
1978	Racca Rovers (1)
1979	Bendel Insurance (2)
1980	Shooting Stars (2)
1981	Enugu Rangers (4)
1982	Enugu Rangers (5)
1983	Shooting Stars (3)
1984	Enugu Rangers (6)
1985	New Nigeria Bank FC (1)
1986	Leventis United (1)
1987	Iwuanyanwu Nationale (1)
1988	Iwuanyanwu Nationale (2)
1989	Iwuanyanwu Nationale (3)
1990	Iwuanyanwu Nationale (4)
1991	Julius Berger (1)
1992	Stationery Stores (1)
1993	Iwuanyanwu Nationale (5)
1994	BCC Lions (1)
1995	Shooting Stars (4)
1996	Udoji United (1)
1997	Dolphin F.C. (1)
1998	Shooting Stars (5)
1999	Lobi Stars (1)
2000	Julius Berger (2)
2001	Enyimba FC (1)
2002	Enyimba FC (2)
2003	Enyimba FC (3)
2004	Dolphin F.C. (2)
2005	Enyimba FC (4)
2006	Ocean Boys FC (1)
2007	Enyimba FC (5)
2007–08	Kano Pillars FC (1)
2008–09	Bayelsa United (1)
2009–10	Enyimba FC (6)
2010–11	Dolphin F.C. (3)
2012	Kano Pillars FC (2)
2013	Kano Pillars FC (3)
2014	Kano Pillars FC (4)
2015	Enyimba FC (7)
2016	Enugu Rangers (7)
2017	Plateau United FC (1)
2018	Championship canceled
2019	Enyimba FC (8)
2019–20	Championship canceled due to COVID-19
2020–21	Akwa United FC (1)
2021–22	Rivers United (1)
2022–23	Enyimba FC (9)
2023–24	Enugu Rangers (8)
2024–25	Remo Stars (1)
2025–26	Enugu Rangers (9)

=== Most titles won ===
Clubs	Championship	Years
Enyimba (Aba)	9	2001, 2002, 2003, 2005, 2007, 2010, 2015, 2019, 2022–23
Enugu Rangers (Enugu)	9	1974, 1975, 1977, 1981, 1982, 1984, 2016, 2023–24, 2025–26
Shooting Stars (Ibadan)	5	1976, 1980, 1983, 1995, 1998
Heartland F.C. (Owerri)	5	1987, 1988, 1989, 1990, 1993
Kano Pillars (Kano)	4	2008, 2012, 2013, 2014
Dolphins (Port Harcourt)	3	1997, 2004, 2011
Bendel Insurance (Benin City)	2	1973, 1979
Julius Berger (Lagos)	2	1991, 2000
Lobi Stars (Makurdi)	1	1999
BCC Lions (Gboko)	1	1994
Stationery Stores (Lagos)	1	1992
Leventis United (Ibadan)	1	1986
Plateau United (Jos)	1	2017
Bayelsa United (Yenegoa)	1	2009
Ocean Boys (Brass)	1	2006
Udoji United (Awka)	1	1996
New Nigeria Bank (Benin City)	1	1985
Racca Rovers (Kano)	1	1978
Mighty Jets (Jos)	1	1972
Akwa United (Uyo)	1	2020–21
Rivers United (Port Harcourt)	1	2021–22
Remo Stars (Ikenne)	1	2024–25

== Top scorers ==
Season	Player	Club	Goals
1990	(Nigeria) Ishaya Jatau	Iwuanyanwu Nationale	17
1991	(Nigeria) Richard Ojomo	Bendel United	12
1992	(Nigeria) Arthur Moses	Stationery Stores	10
1993	(Nigeria) Anthony Nwaigwe	Iwuanyanwu Nationale	13
1994	(Nigeria) Olumide Harris	Shooting Stars	14
1995	(Nigeria) Ben Agawam	Gombe United	12
1996	(Nigeria) Peter Anyiolobi	Enyimba	9
1997	(Democratic Republic of the Congo) Paul Kpoughoul	Jasper United / BCC Lions	16
1998	(Nigeria) Hassan Minna	Gombe United	14
1999	(Nigeria) Emmanuel Ago	Iwuanyanwu Nationale	14
2000	(Nigeria) Peter Ijeh	Julius Berger	14
2001	(Nigeria) Uche Okereke	Enugu Rangers	13
2002	(Ghana) Joetex Frimpong (Nigeria) Victor Ezeji	El-Kanemi Warriors; Sharks	16
2003	(Nigeria) Chibuzor Ozurumba (Nigeria) Endurance Idahor	Iwuanyanwu Nationale; Julius Berger	13
2004	(Nigeria) Kabiru Alausa	Julius Berger	13
2005	(Nigeria) Timothy Anjembe (Nigeria) Joseph Akpala	Lobi Stars; Bendel Insurance	12
2006	(Nigeria) Ikechukwu Ibenegbu	El-Kanemi Warriors	10
2007	(Nigeria) Aruwa Ameh	Kaduna United	10
2008	(Nigeria) Abubakar Babale	Wikki Tourists / Sunshine Stars	14
2009	(Nigeria) Orok Akarandut	Akwa United	17
2010	(Nigeria) Ahmed Musa	Kano Pillars	18
2011	(Nigeria) Jude Aneke	Kaduna United	20
2012	(Nigeria) Sibi Gwar	Niger Tornadoes	17
2013	(Nigeria) Victor Namo	Nasarawa United	18
2014	(Nigeria) Mfon Udoh	Enyimba	23
2015	(Nigeria) Gbolahan Salami	Warri Wolves	17
2016	(Nigeria) Godwin Obaje	Wikki Tourists	18
2017	(Nigeria) Anthony Okpotu	Lobi Stars	19
2018	(Nigeria) Junior Lokosa	Kano Pillars	19
2019	(Nigeria) Mfon Udoh (Nigeria) Sunusi Ibrahim	Akwa United; Nasarawa United	10
2019–20	(Nigeria) Israel Abia (Note: Leading goalscorer as at the time of cancellation.)	Enugu Rangers	12
2020–21	(Nigeria) Silas Nwankwo (Nigeria) Charles Atshimene	Nasarawa United; Akwa United	19
2021–22	(Nigeria) Chijioke Akuneto	Rivers United	19
2022–23	(Nigeria) Chukwuemeka Obioma	Enyimba	16
2023–24	(Nigeria) Chijioke Mbaoma	Enyimba	17
2024–25	(Nigeria) Anas Yusuf	Nasarawa United	18
2025–26	(Nigeria) Jonathan Mairiga (Note: Three players finished topscorers with the same goals but Mairiga was awarded the Golden Boot.)	Wikki Tourists	14
