= League Bloggers Awards =

Association football league awards in Nigeria

League Bloggers Award
- Sport: Association football
- Competition: All levels of Nigerian football
- Country: Nigeria
- Presented by: League Bloggers Awards

History
- First award: 2012
- First winner: (Nigeria) Reuben Gabriel
- Most wins: (Nigeria) Mfon Udoh (2 awards)
- Most recent: (Nigeria) Chijioke Mbaoma
- Website: thelbawards.wordpress.com

The League Bloggers Awards (also called LBA), is an independent initiative conceived to celebrate players, coaches and administrators in the Nigeria Premier Football League (NPFL), Nigeria Women Football League and Nigeria National League. Formerly called Naija Premier League Online Award, it started in 2009 and was rebranded to become League Bloggers Awards in 2012. Awards (Player Of The Month & Coach Of The Month) were initially on a monthly basis from 2009 before the first End Of Season Award kicked off in 2012. The end-of-season awards ceremony wasn't held in 2015, 2018, 2020 & 2021 for various reasons.

== History ==
Founded in 2009 by Ojeikere Aikhoje and George Akpayen as the Naija Premier League Online Awards when both men met during the Super 4 Pre-Season Tournament, in Ijebu-Ode, Ogun State. The awards were initially on a monthly basis before becoming a seasonal event in 2012 when it was rebranded as the League Bloggers Awards (LBA). Reuben Gabriel was the first winner of the Player Of The Season Award. The awards ceremony have held in Lagos every year since 2012, except in 2018 when the League was suspended and in 2020 due to COVID-19 pandemic.

== Main categories ==
Season	Player of the Season	Rookie of the Season	Coach of the Season	Club of the Season	Top Scorer	Women Player of the Season	NNL Player of the Season
2012	(Nigeria) Reuben Gabriel (Kano Pillars)	(Nigeria) Andrew Abalogu (ABS F.C.)	(Nigeria) Dominic Iorfa (Lobi Stars)	(Nigeria) Kano Pillars	(Nigeria) Sibi Gwar (Niger Tornadoes)	—N/a	—N/a
2013	(Nigeria) Rabiu Ali (Kano Pillars)	(Nigeria) Oghenekaro Etebo (Warri Wolves)	(Nigeria) Mohammed Babagananu (Kano Pillars)	(Nigeria) Kano Pillars	(Nigeria) Victor Namo (Nasarawa United)	—N/a	—N/a
2014	(Nigeria) Mfon Udoh (|Enyimba FC)	(Nigeria) Chisom Chikatara (Abia Warriors)	(Nigeria) Okey Emordi (Kano Pillars)	(Nigeria) Kano Pillars	(Nigeria) Mfon Udoh (|Enyimba FC)	—N/a	—N/a
2015	—N/a	—N/a	—N/a	—N/a	(Nigeria) Gbolahan Salami (Warri Wolves)	—N/a	—N/a
2016	(Nigeria) Chisom Egbuchulam (Rangers International)	—N/a	(Nigeria) Imama Amapakabo (Rangers International)	(Nigeria) Rangers International	(Nigeria) Godwin Obaje (Wikki Tourists)	—N/a	—N/a
2017	(Nigeria) Anthony Okpotu (Lobi Stars)	(Nigeria) Peter Eneji (Plateau United)	(Nigeria) Kennedy Boboye (Akwa United)	(Nigeria) Plateau United	(Nigeria) Anthony Okpotu(Lobi Stars)	(Nigeria) Rasheedat Ajibade (FC Robo)	(Nigeria) Michael Ohanu (Kwara United)
2018	—N/a	—N/a	—N/a	—N/a	(Nigeria) Junior Lokosa (Kano Pillars)	—N/a	—N/a
2019	(Nigeria) Mfon Udoh (|Enyimba FC)	—N/a	(Nigeria) Usman Abd'Allah (Enyimba)	(Nigeria) Enyimba Football Club	(Nigeria) Mfon Udoh (Enyimba Football Club) (Nigeria) Sunusi Ibrahim (Nasarawa United)	—N/a	—N/a
2019-20	—N/a	—N/a	—N/a	—N/a	(Nigeria) Israel Abia (Rangers International)	—N/a	—N/a
2020-21	(Nigeria) Silas Nwankwo (|Nasarawa United)	—N/a	(Nigeria) Kennedy Boboye (Akwa United)	(Nigeria) Akwa United	(Nigeria) Charles Atshimene (Akwa United) (Nigeria) Silas Nwankwo (Nasarawa United)	—N/a	—N/a
2021-22	(Nigeria) Chijioke Akuneto (Rivers United)	—N/a	(Nigeria) Stanley Eguma (Rivers United)	(Nigeria) Rivers United	(Nigeria) Chijioke Akuneto (Rivers United)	—N/a	—N/a
2022-23	(Nigeria) Chukwuemeka Obioma (Enyimba Football Club)	(Nigeria) Robert Mizo (Bayelsa United)	(Nigeria) Daniel Ogunmodede (Remo Stars)	(Nigeria) Remo Stars	(Nigeria) Chukwuemeka Obioma (Enyimba Football Club)	—N/a	—N/a
2023-24	(Nigeria) Chijioke Mbaoma (Enyimba FC)	(Nigeria) Suleman Sani (Akwa United)	(Nigeria) Fidelis Ilechukwu (Rangers International)	(Nigeria) Rangers International	(Nigeria) Chijioke Mbaoma (|Enyimba FC)	(Nigeria) Emem Essien (Edo Queens)	(Nigeria) Kparobo Arierhi (Beyond Limits F.A.)
2024-25	—N/a	—N/a	—N/a	—N/a	—N/a	—N/a	—N/a

== Sponsorship ==
In 2014, Betting brand, 1960BET sponsored the awards and presented a brand new car to the Player of the Season, Mfon Udoh Football engagement platform, 54footballx, initially signed a two-year deal with the LBA in 2024 as Sponsor.
