= 2022–23 Enyimba F.C. season =

47th season in existence of Enyimba

Enyimba
2022–23 season
- Chairman: Felix Anyansi-Agwu
- Manager: Finidi George
- Nigeria Professional Football League: 1st
- Nigeria FA Cup: Round of 32
- Top goalscorer: League: Chukwuemeka Obioma (16) (14 in Regular Season, two in Championship Play-off); All: Chukwuemeka Obioma (16)
- Biggest win: 5–0 (vs. Gombe United (H), 7 May 2023, NPFL)

The 2022–23 season was Enyimba's 47th season in the Nigerian football league system. In addition to the league, the club also competed in the Nigeria Federation Cup.

== First-team squad ==
No.	Name	Position	Nationality	Date of birth (age)	Apps	Goals
Goalkeepers
1	John Noble	GK	(Nigeria)	6 June 1993 (age 32)	8	0
12	Olorunleke Ojo	GK	(Nigeria)	17 August 1995 (age 30)	7	0
21	Sabirou Bassa-Djeri	GK	(Togo)	17 June 1987 (age 38)	6	0
Defenders
2	Yakubu Bilal	RB	(Nigeria)	6 June 1993 (age 32)	10	0
3	Ini Edem	LB	(Nigeria)	10 September 2003 (age 22)	11	0
18	Pascal Eze	CB	(Nigeria)	23 February 1997 (age 29)	17	0
23	Adeleke Adekunle	CB	(Nigeria)	27 July 2002 (age 23)	5	0
24	Chigozie Chilekwu	LB	(Nigeria)	4 August 1996 (age 29)	2	0
25	Somiari Alalibo	CB	(Nigeria)	30 November 2001 (age 24)	11	0
26	Chikamso Okechukwu	CB	(Nigeria)		4	0
29	Imoh Obot	LB	(Nigeria)	15 December 2002 (age 23)	15	0
33	Unwana Asuquo	RB	(Nigeria)	3 June 2001 (age 24)	11	0
Midfielders
6	Eze Ekwutoziam	DM	(Nigeria)		12	0
10	Elijah Akanni	AM	(Nigeria)	22 August 2001 (age 24)	10	2
14	Abdullahi Fatai	AM	(Nigeria)	8 May 1998 (age 27)	12	0
16	Philip Ozor	CM	(Nigeria)	12 July 1999 (age 26)	7	0
22	Ikenna Cooper	AM	(Nigeria)	6 June 1993 (age 32)	14	2
28	James Oronsaye	CM	(Nigeria)		2	0
31	Tijani Kabiru	CM	(Nigeria)	8 August 2002 (age 23)	9	0
Forwards
7	Nonso Nzediegwu	RW	(Nigeria)		7	0
9	Chukwuemeka Obioma	ST	(Nigeria)	20 November 1998 (age 27)	19	16
11	Chijioke Akuneto	LW	(Nigeria)	10 October 1997 (age 28)	3	0
13	Sadiq Abubakar	ST	(Nigeria)	9 June 1997 (age 28)	17	2
15	Chijioke Mbaoma	ST	(Nigeria)	6 May 2003 (age 22)	14	5
20	Ademola Adebambo	ST	(Nigeria)	22 January 2000 (age 26)	5	1

== Competitions ==
Win Draw Loss

=== Overview ===
Competition	First match	Last match	Starting round	Final position	Record							
Competition	First match	Last match	Starting round	Final position	Pld	W	D	L	GF	GA	GD	Win %
Nigeria Professional Football League	14 January 2023	21 May 2023	Matchday 1	Third	18	9	5	4	25	12	+13	50.00
FA Cup	10 May 2023	10 May 2023	Round of 32	Round of 32	1	0	0	1	1	1	+0	0.00
Total					19	9	5	5	26	13	+13	47.37

Source: Flashcore

=== Nigeria Professional Football League ===
==== Regular season ====
===== Group A =====
====== League table ======
Pos	Team	Pld	W	D	L	GF	GA	GD	Pts	
1	Bendel Insurance	18	8	10	0	22	11	+11	34	Qualification to Championship round
2	Remo Stars	18	9	6	3	21	14	+7	33	Qualification to Championship round
3	Enyimba	18	9	5	4	25	12	+13	32	Qualification to Championship round
4	Akwa United	18	9	5	4	24	14	+10	32	
5	Plateau United	18	7	5	6	29	23	+6	26	

Updated to match(es) played on 21 May 2023. Source: NPFL
Rules for classification: 1) points; 2) goal difference; 3) number of goals scored

==== Matches ====
On 28 December 2022, the fixtures for the forthcoming season were announced.

14 January 2023 1	Nasarawa United	1–2	Enyimba FC	Jos
16:00 BST	Josiah Oche 87'	Report	Elijah Akanni 32'; Imoh Obot 37'	Stadium: New Jos Stadium

18 January 2023 2	Enyimba	0–0	Akwa United	Aba
16:00 BST		Report		Stadium: Enyimba Stadium

22 January 2023 3	Plateau United	2–1	Enyimba	Jos
16:00 BST	Onyebuchi Ifeanyi 36'; Kazeem Ogunleye 90+6'	Report	Chibuike Nwaiwu 25'	Stadium: New Jos Stadium

29 January 2023 4	Enyimba	3–0	Kwara United	Aba
15:00 BST	Chukwuemeka Obioma 11' (68); Ademola Adebambo 18'	Report		Stadium: Enyimba Stadium

1 February 2023 5	Remo Stars	1–0	Enyimba	Ikenne
16:00 BST	Samuel Anakwe 1'	Report		Stadium: Remo Stars Stadium

5 February 2023 6	Enyimba	2–0	El-Kanemi	Aba
15:00 BST	Chukwuemeka Obioma 27' (45)	Report		Stadium: Enyimba Stadium

11 February 2023 7	Gombe United	1–2	Enyimba	Gombe
16:00 BST	Yusuf Taiye 12'	Report	Elijah Akanni {goal	Stadium: Pantami Stadium

15 February 2023 8	Enyimba	2–0	Shooting Stars	Aba
16:00 BST	Chukwuemeka Obioma 2' (45+1)	Report		Stadium: Enyimba Stadium

19 February 2023 9	Bendel Insurance	1–0	Enyimba	Benin City
16:00 BST	Imade Osarenkhoe 23'	Report		Stadium: Samuel Ogbemudia Stadium

26 March 2023 10	Enyimba	1–1	Bendel Insurance	Aba
16:00 BST	Chukwuemeka Obioma 44' (pen.)	Report	Imade Osarenkhoe 80'	Stadium: Enyimba Stadium

29 March 2023 11	Enyimba	1–1	Nasarawa United	Aba
16:00 GMT	Chukwuemeka Obioma 12' (pen.)	Report	Emmanuel Ogbole 75'	Stadium: Enyimba Stadium

2 April 2021 12	Akwa United	1–0	Enyimba	Uyo
16:00 GMT	Uche Collins 73'	Report		Stadium: Godswill Akpabio Stadium

9 April 2023 13	Enyimba	2–1	Plateau United	Aba
15:00 GMT	Imoh Obot 35'; Chukwuemeka Obioma 53'	Report	Izuchukwu Chimezie 71'	Stadium: Enyimba Stadium

16 April 2023 14	Kwara United	1–2	Enyimba	Akure
16:00 GMT	Chijioke Mbaoma 29' (78)	Report	Samad Kadiri 35' (pen.)	Stadium: Akure Sports Complex

23 April 2023 15	Enyimba	1–1	Remo Stars	Aba
15:00 GMT	Chijioke Mbaoma 90+7'	Report	F. Dubia 43'	Stadium: Enyimba Stadium

30 April 2023 16	El-Kanemi Warriors	0–1	Enyimba	Maiduguri
16:00 GMT		Report	Chukwuemeka Obioma 59'	Stadium: El-Kanemi Stadium

7 May 2023 17	Enyimba	5–0	Gombe United	Aba
15:00 GMT	Chukwuemeka Obioma 18' (77), pen.' (84); Ikenna Cooper 36'; Sadiq Abubakar 65'	Report		Stadium: Enyimba Stadium

21 May 2023 18	Shooting Stars	0–0	Enyimba	Ibadan
16:00 GMT		Report		Stadium: Lekan Salami Stadium

==== Championship round ====
The Championship round, also known as the super six playoffs, was held between 3–11 June at the Mobolaji Johnson Arena, Lagos.

Pos	Team	Pld	W	D	L	GF	GA	GD	Pts		ENY	REM	RIV	SUN	BEN	LOB
1	Enyimba	5	2	3	0	8	4	+4	9	Champions League	—	—	1–1	3–0	—	1–0
2	Remo Stars	5	2	3	0	8	5	+3	9	Champions League	2–2	—	—	—	1–0	2–0
3	Rivers United	5	2	3	0	6	4	+2	9	CAF CC	—	2–2	—	1–0	2–1	—
4	Sunshine Stars	5	1	2	2	5	7	−2	5		—	1–1	—	—	1–1	3–1
5	Bendel Insurance	5	0	3	2	3	5	−2	3	CAF CC (Note: Bendel Insurance qualified as Federation Cup winners.)	1–1	—	—	—	—	0–0
6	Lobi Stars	5	0	2	3	1	6	−5	2		—	—	0–0	—	—	—

Source: Soccerway
Rules for classification: 1) Points; 2) Head-to-head points 3) Goal difference; 4) Goals scored; 5) Disciplinary points; 6) Play-off (Only to decide champions, runners-up, third placed and relegation spots); 7) Drawing of lots
