= Adiele Eriugo =

Nigerian footballer (born 2006)

Personal information
- Full name: Adiele Peter Eriugo
- Date of birth: 12 August 2006 (age 20)
- Place of birth: Nnetu, Aba, Nigeria
- Position: Forward

Team information
- Current team: Zagorec Krapina

Youth career
- Enyimba

Senior career*
Years	Team	Apps	(Gls)
2023–2024	Enyimba	18	(0)
2024–2026	Kustošija	4	(1)
2025	→ Maksimir (loan)	13	(14)
2025–2026	→ Rudeš (loan)	7	(0)
2026–	Zagorec Krapina	11	(4)
- * Club domestic league appearances and goals as of 18:08, 2 November 2026 (UTC)

Adiele Peter Eriugo (born 12 August 2006) is a Nigerian professional footballer who plays as a forward for Croatian club Zagorec Krapina.

== Club career ==
Eriugo progressed through the academy of Nigeria Professional Football League (NPFL) side Enyimba, where impressive performances for the club's 'B' team earned him his professional debut in a 1–1 draw with Bendel Insurance in March 2023. He made two further cameo appearances before making his first start for the club in an eventual 2–1 win against Plateau United, with manager Finidi George stating after the game that Eriugo "did so well", and that he "was impressed with his performance".

In the first match of the Super Six playoffs, between the top six teams in the NPFL, Eriugo scored his first goal for Enyimba in a 2–2 draw with Remo Stars. Following the conclusion of the 2022–23 season, which ended with Enyimba winning their ninth league title, Eriugo was offered his first professional contract with the club. He agreed to a two-year deal in August 2023.

In a 2–0 loss to Gombe United on 8 October 2023, Eriugo suffered an injury which initially ruled him out for two weeks. Despite this, he was included in the squad for Enyimba's CAF Champions League tie against Moroccan side WAC later in the same month.

== Career statistics ==
=== Club ===
As of 2 November 2026.

Appearances and goals by club, season and competition
Club	Season	League			Cup (Note: Includes Nigeria Federation Cup and Croatian Cup)		Continental		Other		Total	
Club	Season	Division	Apps	Goals	Apps	Goals	Apps	Goals	Apps	Goals	Apps	Goals
Enyimba	2022–23	NPFL	6	0	0	0	0	0	5 (Note: Appearances in the Super Six playoffs)	1	11	1
Enyimba	2023–24	NPFL	12	0	0	0	3 (Note: One appearance in the CAF Champions League, two appearances in the African Football League)	0	0	0	15	0
Enyimba	Total		18	0	0	0	3	0	5	1	26	1
Kustošija	2024–25	2. NL	3	1	0	0	–		0	0	3	1
Kustošija	2025–26	2. NL	1	0	0	0	–		0	0	1	0
Kustošija	Total		4	1	0	0	0	0	0	0	4	1
Maksimir (loan)	2024–25	3. NL	13	14	0	0	–		3 (Note: Appearances in the Zagreb FA Cup)	0	16	14
Rudeš (loan)	2025–26	1. NL	7	0	2	0	–		0	0	9	0
Zagorec Krapina	2026–27	3. NL	11	4	2	1	–		2 (Note: Appearances in the Krapina-Zagorje County FA Cup)	1	15	6
Career total			53	19	4	1	3	0	10	2	70	22
