= 2024–25 Nigeria Premier Football League =

Nigerian association football season

Nigeria Premier Football League
- Season: 2024–25
- Dates: 31 August 2024 – 25 May 2025
- Champions: Remo Stars (1st title)
- Relegated: Akwa United; Heartland; Sunshine Stars; Lobi Stars
- Champions League: Remo Stars; Rivers United
- Confederation Cup: Kwara United (as Federation Cup winners); Abia Warriors
- Matches: 380
- Goals: 784 (2.06 per match)
- Top goalscorer: Anas Yusuf (18 goals)
- Biggest home win: Ikorodu City 6–0 Katsina United (10 April 2025)
- Highest scoring: Nasarawa United 3–4 El-Kanemi Warriors (21 September 2024); Enugu Rangers 3–4 Kano Pillars (16 October 2024); Sunshine Stars 4–3 Ikorodu City (25 January 2025)
- Longest winning run: Shooting Stars & Remo Stars (6 matches)
- Longest unbeaten run: El-Kanemi Warriors (10 matches)
- Longest winless run: Lobi Stars (21 matches)
- Longest losing run: Lobi Stars (5 matches)
- All statistics correct as of 25 May 2025.

The 2024–25 Nigeria Premier Football League was the 54th season of Nigeria's top-flight association football league, the 35th since attaining professionalism and the second under the current name. The season commenced early on 31 August 2024 with the defending champions, Enugu Rangers hosting El-Kanemi Warriors.

On 27 April 2025, Remo Stars defeated Niger Tornadoes to secure their first ever Nigeria Premier Football League title with 3 games to spare. With this triumph, they became the first South-western club to win the title since Julius Berger in 2000.

This season also saw an increase of N50 million in prize money for the champions from the previous season, with the winners taking home N200 million. Additionally, the NPFL secured a sponsorship deal with British multinational television production company, IMG/JVco for broadcast of league games.

== Teams ==
=== Changes from previous season ===
Twenty teams, consisting of the top sixteen teams from the previous season and four promoted teams from the Nigeria National League, are competing in the league. The promoted teams are Nasarawa United and El-Kanemi Warriors who both got relegated two seasons ago, and newcomers Ikorodu City and Beyond Limits. Beyond Limits would be subsequently replaced by Heartland who were initially relegated the previous season as Beyond Limits and Remo Stars share the same owners.

▲ Promoted from 2023–24 National League	▼ Relegated to 2024–25 National League
Nasarawa United; El-Kanemi Warriors; Ikorodu City; ~~Beyond Limits~~	Sporting Lagos; Doma United; ~~Heartland~~ (spared); Gombe United

=== Teams information ===
Locations of the 2024–25 Nigeria Premier Football League teams

Team	Location	Kit Supplier	Shirt Sponsor	Stadium	Capacity
Abia Warriors	Umuahia	Owu	Eunisell	Umuahia Township Stadium	5,000
Akwa United	Uyo	Owu	1xBet	Godswill Akpabio Stadium	30,000
Bayelsa United	Yenagoa	GDF	_	Samson Siasia Stadium	5,000
Bendel Insurance	Benin City	Fourteen	Sterling Bank	Samuel Ogbemudia Stadium	12,000
El-Kanemi Warriors	Maiduguri			El-Kanemi Stadium	10,000
Enugu Rangers	Enugu	Cone Sport	Afrinvest, Shopurban, Senior Barman, Nortra	Nnamdi Azikiwe Stadium	22,000
Enyimba	Aba	KK	Stake.com, United Nigeria Airlines	Enyimba International Stadium	16,000
Heartland	Owerri	Noyan	_	Dan Anyiam Stadium	10,000
Ikorodu City	Ikorodu, Lagos	Play	BetKing	Onikan Stadium	10,000
Kano Pillars	Kano	Play	Rambo	Sani Abacha Stadium (Note: Kano Pillars played some of their home games at Muhammadu Dikko Stadium in Katsina as their home stadium Sani Abacha Stadium, Kano was undergoing renovation works.)	16,000
Katsina United	Katsina	Owu	_	Muhammadu Dikko Stadium	35,000
Kwara United	Ilorin	Owu	22bet	Kwara State Stadium	18,000
Lobi Stars	Makurdi	Owu	_	Nnamdi Azikiwe Stadium (Note: Lobi Stars play their home matches at Nnamdi Azikiwe Stadium, Enugu and previously at Lafia Township Stadium, Lafia and Abubakar Tafawa Balewa Stadium, Bauchi instead of their regular home ground Aper Aku Stadium, Makurdi due to renovation works.)	22,000
Nasarawa United	Lafia	Cone Sport		Lafia Township Stadium	10,000
Niger Tornadoes	Minna	Ammaz	Niger Foods	Bako Kontagora Stadium	5,000
Plateau United	Jos	Kapspor	_	New Jos Stadium	44,000
Remo Stars	Ikenne	Cone Sport	Bet9ja	Remo Stars Stadium	5,000
Rivers United	Port Harcourt	Owu	_	Adokiye Amiesimaka Stadium	40,000
Shooting Stars	Ibadan	Mo Woola (MW)	Peculiar	Lekan Salami Stadium	15,000
Sunshine Stars	Akure	Cone Sport	Sunbeth	Dipo Dina International Stadium (Note: Sunshine Stars play their home games at Dipo Dina International Stadium, Ijebu-Ode rather than their regular home ground, Akure Township Stadium, Akure due to renovation works.)	20,000

=== Managerial changes ===
Not including interim management.

Team	Outgoing manager	Manner of departure	Date of departure	Incoming manager	Date of appointment
Nasarawa United	(Nigeria) Usman Adams	Sacked	31 August 2024	(Nigeria) Kabiru Dogo	3 August 2024
Kwara United	(Nigeria) Kabiru Dogo	Moved to Nasarawa United	31 August 2024	(Nigeria) Tunde Sanni	31 August 2024
Lobi Stars	(Nigeria) Eugene Agagbe	Sacked	6 October 2024	(Nigeria) Daniel Amokachi	6 October 2024
Ikorodu City	(Nigeria) Bright Ozebagbe	Resignation	6 October 2024	(Nigeria) Nurudeen Aweroro	22 October 2024
Sunshine Stars	(Nigeria) Kennedy Boboye	Resignation	11 November 2024	(Nigeria) Abubakar Bala	11 December 2024
Bendel Insurance	(Nigeria) Monday Odigie	Resignation	22 November 2024	(Nigeria) Greg Ikhenoba	23 November 2024
Enyimba	(Nigeria) Yemi Olanrewaju	Sacked	28 December 2024	(Nigeria) Stanley Eguma	29 December 2024

== League table ==
Pos	Team	Pld	W	D	L	GF	GA	GD	Pts	
1	Remo Stars (C)	38	22	5	11	49	31	+18	71	Qualification for the Champions League
2	Rivers United	38	18	10	10	35	29	+6	64	Qualification for the Champions League
3	Abia Warriors	38	18	6	14	43	40	+3	60	Qualification for the Confederation Cup
4	Ikorodu City	38	17	8	13	60	44	+16	59	
5	Bendel Insurance (Note: Bendel Insurance were initially deducted 3 points and 3 goals but was later rescinded.)	38	15	11	12	39	33	+6	56	
6	Enyimba	38	14	13	11	38	35	+3	55	
7	Plateau United (Note: Plateau United were deducted 3 points and 3 goals.)	38	16	9	13	40	38	+2	54	
8	Shooting Stars	38	15	9	14	39	38	+1	54	
9	Kano Pillars	38	15	8	15	44	45	−1	53	
10	Enugu Rangers	38	14	10	14	42	34	+8	52	
11	Bayelsa United	38	13	13	12	39	36	+3	52	
12	Nasarawa United (Note: Nasarawa United were initially deducted 3 points and 3 goals but was later rescinded.)	38	14	10	14	40	41	−1	52	
13	Niger Tornadoes	38	14	9	15	40	46	−6	51	
14	Kwara United	38	14	8	16	38	36	+2	50	Qualification for the Confederation Cup (Note: Kwara United qualified to the CAF Confederation Cup as Federation Cup winners.)
15	Katsina United	38	14	8	16	30	36	−6	50	
16	El-Kanemi Warriors	38	12	13	13	34	41	−7	49	
17	Heartland (R)	38	12	12	14	33	34	−1	48	Relegation to the National League
18	Akwa United (R)	38	12	8	18	35	39	−4	44	Relegation to the National League
19	Sunshine Stars (R)	38	11	8	19	34	51	−17	41	Relegation to the National League
20	Lobi Stars (R)	38	6	10	22	29	56	−27	28	Relegation to the National League

Source: NPFL
Rules for classification: 1) points; 2) goal difference; 3) number of goals scored
(C) Champion; (R) Relegated

== Results ==
Home \ Away	ABW	AKW	BAY	BEN	ELK	ENU	ENY	HEA	IKR	KAN	KAT	KWA	LOB	NAS	NIG	PLA	REM	RIV	3SC	SUN
Abia Warriors		2–0	1–0	1–0	2–1	1–0	1–1	0–2	2–0	2–0	2–0	1–0	2–0	1–1	2–1	3–1	0–2	2–0	3–1	3–0
Akwa United	1–1		2–0	1–1	1–1	0–0	2–1	2–0	2–1	2–0	1–0	2–1	1–1	1–0	2–0	1–0	1–2	1–1	2–0	1–2
Bayelsa United	0–1	2–1		2–1	2–1	0–0	1–1	1–0	1–0	1–1	1–1	1–1	1–0	2–2	4–1	1–0	3–0	1–0	3–0	4–1
Bendel Insurance	0–1	1–0	3–0		1–1	0–0	1–0	1–0	2–1	0–1	1–0	3–1	1–0	1–1	3–0	2–1	2–1	0–0	1–0	1–0
El-Kanemi Warriors	3–0	1–0	0–0	0–0		2–1	1–0	0–0	1–1	1–0	1–0	1–1	1–0	1–0	1–0	2–2	2–0	1–2	2–2	1–0
Enugu Rangers	1–0	1–1	1–0	3–2	0–0		1–2	0–2	2–0	3–4	4–0	3–0	3–0	2–0	1–2	0–1	2–1	1–0	0–1	3–0
Enyimba	2–1	1–0	1–1	0–0	1–0	0–0		1–1	2–1	2–1	3–0	2–0	2–1	2–1	1–1	0–1	0–0	1–0	1–1	0–0
Heartland	0–1	2–1	1–1	1–1	0–0	0–0	1–3		1–1	2–0	0–0	0–0	1–0	3–2	2–0	2–0	1–0	2–0	2–1	1–0
Ikorodu City	3–2	4–1	3–2	3–0	2–0	0–1	2–2	2–0		4–1	6–0	2–1	4–2	1–2	3–0	2–1	1–1	2–0	2–1	2–1
Kano Pillars	1–0	1–0	0–0	0–0	2–1	2–1	2–0	2–2	3–0		1–0	1–1	2–0	1–1	2–1	2–1	0–2	2–0	3–1	2–0
Katsina United	5–1	1–0	1–1	2–1	3–0	0–0	2–1	1–0	1–2	1–0		1–0	3–0	1–0	1–1	1–0	2–0	0–0	1–0	1–0
Kwara United	0–0	0–2	1–0	0–1	2–0	1–1	2–0	1–0	0–0	2–0	1–0		4–0	1–0	1–2	2–0	1–0	3–1	2–0	3–0
Lobi Stars	3–1	0–0	2–1	2–1	2–2	2–4	0–1	0–0	0–1	2–2	1–1	1–0		1–2	0–2	1–0	2–2	0–1	1–0	1–1
Nasarawa United	3–0	2–0	0–0	2–1	3–4	1–0	3–2	1–0	0–0	1–0	1–0	0–1	1–0		2–0	3–2	1–0	1–1	1–1	1–1
Niger Tornadoes	1–1	1–0	1–1	1–1	2–0	0–1	0–1	2–1	0–0	3–2	1–0	2–1	1–1	0–0		1–1	2–1	0–1	2–0	4–1
Plateau United	1–0	1–0	1–0	2–1	2–0	0–0	0–0	3–2	1–0	2–1	1–0	0–0	2–1	2–0	1–2		3–1	2–1	1–1	3–0
Remo Stars	3–2	2–1	2–0	1–0	2–0	2–1	2–0	2–0	4–1	2–1	0–0	2–0	1–0	3–0	1–0	1–0		0–0	2–0	1–0
Rivers United	1–0	2–1	0–1	2–2	1–1	1–0	2–0	3–1	1–0	1–0	1–0	2–1	1–0	2–1	1–0	1–1	1–0		2–0	1–0
Shooting Stars	2–0	2–1	1–0	1–0	3–0	5–1	0–0	1–0	0–0	2–0	1–0	1–0	2–2	2–0	3–1	1–1	0–1	0–0		1–0
Sunshine Stars	0–0	1–0	3–0	1–2	1–0	1–0	2–1	0–0	4–3	1–1	2–0	4–3	1–0	1–0	1–2	2–2	1–2	1–1	0–1	

Source: NPFL
Legend: Blue = home team win; Yellow = draw; Red = away team win.

== Positions by round ==
To preserve chronological evolvements, any postponed matches are not included to the round at which they were originally scheduled, but added to the full round they were played immediately afterwards. For example, if a match is scheduled for round 7, but then played between rounds 8 and 9, it will be added to the standings for round 8.

Team ╲ Round	1	2	3	4	5	6	7	8	9	10	11	12	13	14	15	16	17	18	19	20	21	22	23	24	25	26	27	28	29	30	31	32	33	34	35	36	37	38
Abia Warriors	18	16	14	13	15	9	14	10	5	9	13	13	15	11	14	11	12	10	7	5	8	5	4	5	4	5	7	9	5	3	3	3	3	4	3	3	3	3
Akwa United	11	10	12	16	19	16	19	18	20	19	20	16	18	17	19	19	20	17	19	19	19	20	18	19	19	19	19	19	19	17	16	18	18	18	18	18	18	18
Bayelsa United	19	17	18	17	18	15	18	16	18	18	15	14	16	13	13	10	8	9	11	13	11	13	12	15	15	16	14	16	13	15	12	13	10	10	9	10	13	11
Bendel Insurance	13	15	16	11	12	14	11	14	15	11	16	20	19	20	18	18	19	15	15	17	17	15	16	10	9	8	9	7	9	7	7	7	5	5	6	6	5	5
El-Kanemi Warriors	14	14	6	8	10	10	13	5	6	4	7	5	3	4	5	6	5	5	5	6	4	6	6	9	8	10	8	10	11	11	13	14	15	16	16	15	16	16
Enugu Rangers	9	12	7	7	4	5	7	8	9	5	6	4	5	3	4	3	3	4	4	4	6	4	5	3	6	4	5	5	3	5	5	5	8	6	8	9	8	10
Enyimba	3	6	4	3	2	3	3	3	3	3	3	3	4	6	6	7	9	12	9	9	9	8	8	11	11	12	10	8	8	8	9	8	9	7	5	5	6	6
Heartland	17	20	20	18	16	18	15	19	16	12	9	10	11	12	10	13	11	13	14	12	13	11	11	12	14	13	13	15	16	18	18	17	16	17	17	16	17	17
Ikorodu City	20	19	19	20	20	20	20	17	19	17	12	8	7	5	3	4	6	6	6	7	5	7	7	6	5	7	6	3	4	6	6	6	4	3	4	4	4	4
Kano Pillars	1	2	8	14	7	11	6	6	13	8	5	6	6	8	11	8	10	7	8	8	10	12	14	8	7	6	4	6	7	9	8	9	7	9	7	8	7	9
Katsina United	16	8	10	6	9	8	5	9	10	13	17	15	12	15	12	14	14	16	13	16	14	14	13	14	13	14	15	13	14	12	15	15	17	13	14	14	15	15
Kwara United	15	18	15	15	13	17	12	11	12	16	11	7	10	7	9	12	13	11	12	11	12	10	10	7	10	11	12	11	12	13	10	10	11	12	12	13	12	14
Lobi Stars	10	13	17	19	17	19	17	20	17	20	19	19	17	19	16	20	15	19	18	18	18	19	20	20	20	20	20	20	20	20	20	20	20	20	20	20	20	20
Nasarawa United	8	11	13	9	11	13	10	13	8	14	18	18	20	18	20	16	17	18	20	20	20	18	19	18	18	17	17	17	17	16	17	16	14	15	13	11	9	12
Niger Tornadoes	5	4	3	4	6	6	8	12	14	7	4	9	8	9	8	9	7	8	10	10	7	9	9	13	12	9	11	12	10	10	14	11	12	14	15	17	14	13
Plateau United	6	5	9	10	5	7	4	7	4	6	8	17	14	16	17	15	16	20	17	15	16	16	15	16	16	15	16	14	15	14	11	12	13	11	10	12	10	7
Remo Stars	4	1	1	1	3	1	2	2	2	1	1	1	2	1	2	1	2	1	1	1	1	1	1	1	1	1	1	1	1	1	1	1	1	1	1	1	1	1
Rivers United	12	3	2	2	1	2	1	1	1	2	2	2	1	2	1	2	1	2	2	2	3	3	3	4	3	2	2	2	2	2	2	2	2	2	2	2	2	2
Shooting Stars	7	9	11	12	14	12	16	15	11	15	10	12	9	10	7	5	4	3	3	3	2	2	2	2	2	3	3	4	6	4	4	4	6	8	11	7	11	8
Sunshine Stars	2	7	5	5	8	4	9	4	7	10	14	11	13	14	15	17	18	14	16	14	15	17	17	17	17	18	18	18	18	19	19	19	19	19	19	19	19	19

Leader
Qualification for the Champions League
Qualification for the Confederation Cup
Relegation to Nigeria National League

Source: World Football

== Season statistics ==
=== Scoring ===
==== Top scorers ====
As of 25 May 2025

Rank	Player	Club	Goals
1	(Nigeria) Anas Yusuf	Nasarawa United	18
2	(Nigeria) Rabiu Ali	Kano Pillars	13
3	(Nigeria) Ijoma Antoine	Abia Warriors	12
3	(Nigeria) Sunday Megwo	Abia Warriors	12
3	(Nigeria) Shola Adelani	Ikorodu City	12
6	(Nigeria) Ayomide Cole	Ikorodu City	11
7	(Nigeria) Ahmed Musa	Kano Pillars	10
7	(Nigeria) Rabiu Abdullahi	Bayelsa United	10
9	(Nigeria) Wasiu Alalade	Kwara United	9
9	(Nigeria) Saviour Isaac	Enugu Rangers	9

=== Hat-tricks ===
As of 3 March 2025

Player	For	Against	Result	Date
Anas Yusuf	Nasarawa United	El-Kanemi Warriors	3–4 (H)	21 September 2024
Anas Yusuf	Nasarawa United	Abia Warriors	3–0 (H)	16 October 2024
Ahmad Liman	Sunshine Stars	Kwara United	4–2 (H)	1 March 2025

Note

(H) – Home; (A) – Away

== Attendances ==
Enugu Rangers drew the highest average home attendance in this season.

#	Football club	Average attendance
1	Enugu Rangers	11,684
2	Kano Pillars	7,864
3	Shooting Stars	4,421
4	Kwara United	4,327
5	Niger Tornadoes	3,874
6	Remo Stars	3,842
7	Enyimba FC	3,742
8	Ikorodu City	2,684
9	Plateau United	2,284
10	El-Kanemi Warriors	2,146
11	Bendel Insurance	1,492
12	Nasarawa United	1,436
13	Gombe United	982
14	Bayelsa United	607
15	Abia Warriors	592
16	Heartland FC	512
17	Katsina United	364
18	Akwa United	348
19	Sunshine Stars	332
20	Rivers United	174
