= Daniel Ogunmodede =

Nigerian football coach

Personal information
- Date of birth: 19 May 1980 (age 46)
- Place of birth: Ogun State, Nigeria

Team information
- Current team: Remo Stars, Nigeria (head coach)

Managerial career
- Years: Team
- 2016-2021: Remo Stars (assistant)
- 2021-2022: CD Feirense (assistant)
- 2022-: Remo Stars
- 2024-: Nigeria (assistant)

Daniel Ogunmodede (born 19 May 1980) is a Nigerian professional football manager who is the head coach of Nigeria Premier Football League club Kano Pillars and an assistant manager for the Nigeria national football team. From 2021 to 2022, Ogunmodede was the assistant coach of Portuguese club CD Feirense under Rui Ferreira.

== Early life and education ==
Born in Ogun State, Nigeria, Ogunmodede spent his early years looking to become a medical doctor, per his father's wishes. He would later obtain two degrees, one in physiology from Ladoke Akintola University of Technology and another in human kinetics from the University of Ilorin.

== Coaching career ==
=== Early career ===
Ogunmodede initially pursued a career in football, but an appendix operation prevented him from reaching the professional level. Following medical advice, he discontinued playing to avoid serious health risks.

=== Crown FC ===
After shifting his focus to coaching with his parents' encouragement, he was noticed by the late Crown F.C. chairman, Chief Olagbenro. Chief Olagbenro subsequently granted him a scholarship to pursue coaching training at Nigeria's National Institute of Sports, with the arrangement that he would complete an internship at the club upon earning his coaching certificate. Although Chief Olagbenro passed away before the program was completed, the late chairman's wishes were honoured, and the opportunity for the internship was still provided.

=== Remo Stars ===
In 2015, Ogunmodede was hired by Remo Stars as an assistant manager to Nduka Ugbade and was also put in charge of the youth team.

On 26 September 2016, the Remo Stars senior team earned promotion to the Nigeria Premier Football League for the first time in their history, with Ogunmodede serving as assistant coach.

==== Remo Youth ====
He led the Remo youth team to second place in the Metro League in Lagos and the final of the Ogun State FA Cup.

In 2016, the club established its youth academy system and appointed Ogunmodede as its head. His role expanded in 2020 when he became the club's inaugural Director of Youth Football Development, which ultimately contributed to the formation of Beyond Limits F.A.

==== First senior managerial role ====
In 2020, Ogunmodede was put in charge of the Remo Stars senior team.

In September 2021, he led them back to the NPFL after they finished as runners-up in the NNL playoff Group A.

=== CD Feirense ===
In 2021, Ogunmodede was appointed as assistant manager under Rui Ferreira at CD Feirense.

=== Return to Remo Stars ===
In 2022, Ogunmodede returned to Remo Stars. He led them to back-to-back second placed finishes in the top flight, in 2023 and 2024.

On 27 April 2025, Ogunmodede led Remo Stars to their first ever Nigeria Premier Football League title. They became the first South-West club to win the title since 2000 when Julius Berger won it.

== Manager profile ==
=== Tactics ===
Ogunmodede's coaching philosophy, termed "IjaBall", incorporates tactical elements drawn from the methodologies of José Mourinho, Jürgen Klopp, and Pep Guardiola. His preferred formation is 5-3-2.

Ijaball is a proactive possession style of football. I derived the mentality from the many years of experience I have had with different coaches I worked with. I have worked with some of the best coaches in the country. I learnt from them and mixed it with my ideology and at the end it resulted to Ijaball.

Daniel Ogunmodede, Punch

== Honours ==
=== Manager ===
Remo Stars

- Nigeria Premier Football League: 2024–25

Individual

- NPFL Coach of the Season: 2023
- NIS Hall of Fame: 2025
