= Abdullahi Ibrahim Alhassan =

Nigerian footballer (born 1996)

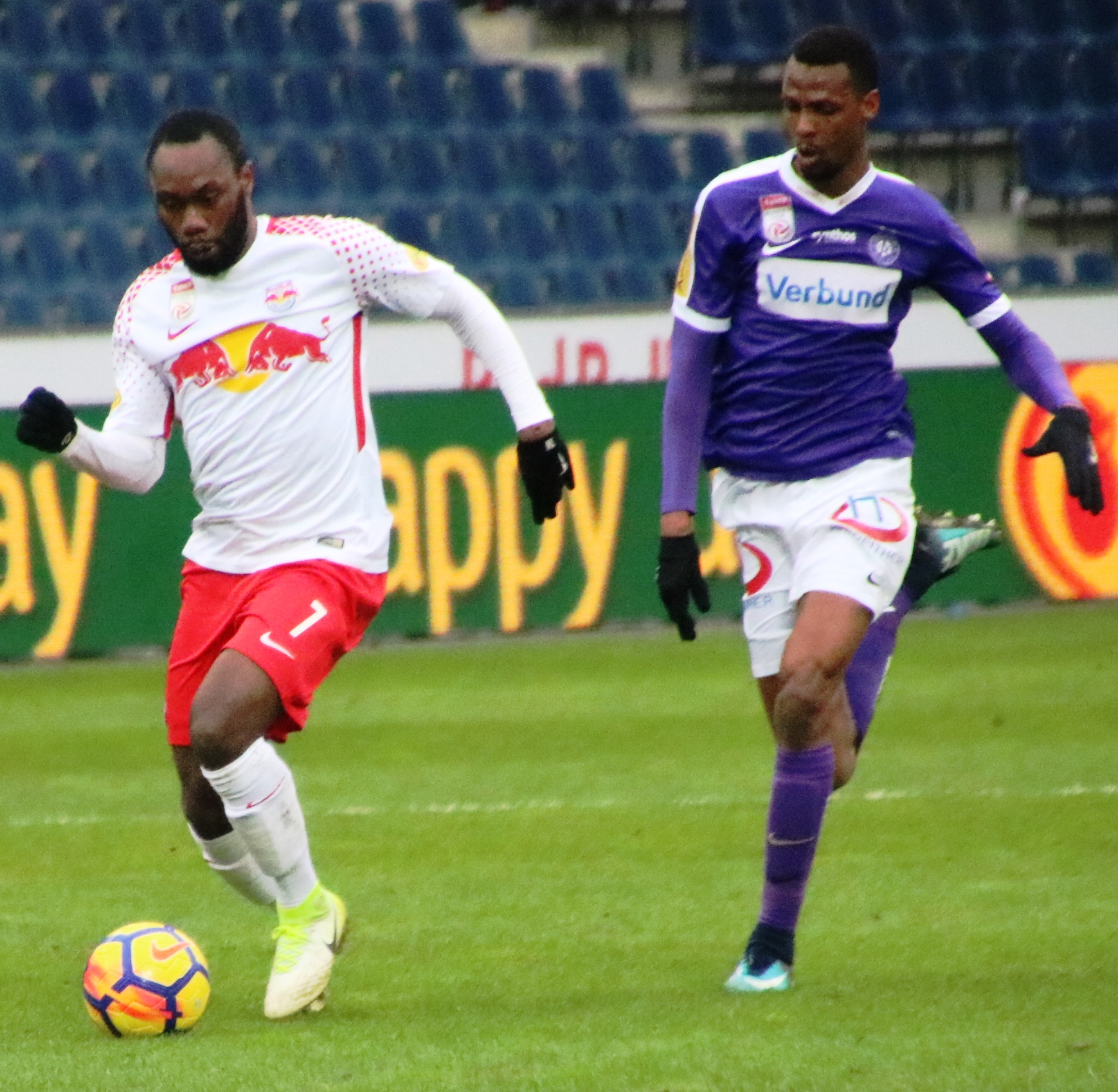
- Alhassan (right) with Austria Wien in 2018

Personal information
- Date of birth: 3 November 1996 (age 30)
- Place of birth: Kano, Nigeria
- Height: 1.92 m (6 ft 4 in)
- Position: Midfielder

Team information
- Current team: Iberia 1999
- Number: 14

Youth career
- 2012–2015: F.C. Heart Academy

Senior career*
Years	Team	Apps	(Gls)
2016	Wikki Tourists	5	(2)
2016–2018	Akwa United	16	(12)
2017–2018	→ Austria Wien (loan)	20	(1)
2018–2022	Nacional	71	(2)
2022–2024	Beerschot	41	(1)
2024	Boavista	0	(0)
2024–2025	Leixões	17	(0)
2025–2026	Lusitânia	15	(0)
2026–	Iberia 1999	0	(0)

International career
- Nigeria U17
2015	Nigeria U20	4	(0)
2017	Nigeria	3	(0)
- * Club domestic league appearances and goals as of 29 July 2026

Abdullahi Ibrahim Alhassan (born 3 November 1996), known as Mu'azzam, is a Nigerian professional footballer who plays as a midfielder for Erovnuli Liga club Iberia 1999.

== Club career ==
=== Early career ===
Alhassan was born in Kano and grew up supporting Nigerian league giants Kano Pillars. He was a youth player for F.C. Hearts Academy and the Nigerian U-17 and U-20 youth sides. He formed an effective partnership with Kelechi Iheanacho at the U-17 level, was the joint-top-scorer in the U-17 world-cup qualifiers. He went on to successfully represent the Nigerian U-20 team in 2015.

=== Wikki Tourists ===
In late 2015, after receiving offers from teams in Belgium, England, Sweden and Croatia, Alhassan suffered an injury after trials at HNK Rijeka. After recovering, and seeking to maintain his fitness, midway through the 2015–16 NPFL season he signed a 6-month deal with the Nigeria Professional Football League side Wikki Tourists. He made his league debut in June 2016 against Kano Pillars in Bauchi. He came on as a second-half substitute to turn the game on its head by scoring two late goals against his hometown club. Already well known as the prodigy dubbed Mu'azzam around his state, the 3–1 upset loss for Pillars did not go down well with the travelling Kano supporters.

=== Akwa United ===
At the end of the 2015–16 NPFL season, Alhassan decided to follow mentor-coach Abdu Maikaba from Wikki to Akwa United as he enjoyed his ongoing development under Maikaba’s tutelage. He immediately became a focal point of his new team's attacks alongside midfield maestro Orji Sylvester Amaechi. Mu'azzam scored his first career hat-trick in April 2017 against Shooting Stars in a 4–2 win in Uyo. He had a total of 10 goals at the halfway point (May 2017) of the season, after which Akwa United negotiated an improved deal with F.C. Heart Academy to make him the highest earning player at the club and joint highest in the league alongside Super Eagles goalkeeper Ikechukwu Ezenwa. Mu'azzam provided the assist to Christian Pyagbara's goal in the 0–1 away win against Kano Pillars in a well rounded performance to rouse Kano fans for a second-straight year. He went on to win the April 2017 League Bloggers Awards for Player of the month alongside his mentor-coach Maikaba.

=== Austria Wien ===
Alhassan signed on a one-year loan with a three-year extension option with Austria Wien on 25 August 2017.

=== Nacional ===
In 2018, Alhassan joined Portuguese club Nacional.

=== Beerschot ===
In the summer of 2022, Alhassan signed a two-year contract with Beerschot in Belgium.

=== Return to Portugal ===
On 4 July 2024, Alhassan returned to Portugal and signed a two-year deal with Boavista. Alhassan left the club on 1 September 2024, as Boavista was unable to lift the ban on registering new players by the end of the transfer window. He subsequently joined Leixões. On 27 June 2025, Alhassan signed a two-year contract with Liga Portugal 2 club Lusitânia.

=== Iberia 1999 ===
In early July 2026, Erovnuli Liga club Iberia 1999 announced the signing of Alhassan.

== International career ==
Alhassan has represented Nigerian youth teams at the U-17 and U-20 level. He was part of the Nigeria at the CAF U-20 Championship 2015. He made four appearances as the Nigerian team went on to win the championship. In May 2017, he was called up to the Nigeria national team.

== Honours ==
Individual

- Nigeria Professional Football League League Bloggers Awards Player of the Month: April 2017
