= Anas Yusuf =

Nigerian footballer (born 2004)

Anas Yussuf
Personal information
- Full name: Anas Opkadibu Yusuf Ayitonu
- Date of birth: 1 February 2004 (age 22)
- Place of birth: Lafia, Nigeria
- Position: Left winger

Senior career*
Years	Team	Apps	(Gls)
2018–2021	Nasarawa United	47	(9)
2021–2022	Wikki Tourists	14	(2)
2022–2026	Nasarawa United	47	(20)
2026	JS Saoura	9	(1)

International career^{‡}
2024–	Nigeria U23	1	(0)
2025–	Nigeria	2	(1)
- * Club domestic league appearances and goals as of 5 June 2026 ‡ National team caps and goals as of 19 August 2025

Anas Yusuf (born 1 February 2004) is a Nigerian professional footballer who plays as a forward. He finished as the league's top scorer in the 2024–25 season, scoring 18 goals and winning the NPFL Golden Boot and Eunisell Boot Award.

In July 2025, he was named in Nigeria's provisional squad for the 2024 African Nations Championship (CHAN).

== Early life and youth career ==
Yusuf was born on 1 February 2004 in Lafia, Nasarawa State, Nigeria. He began playing football at age 12 with FC Basira.

Despite being initially overlooked due to his physical build, Yusuf impressed in non-league competitions and later joined Nasarawa United's youth team in 2018. In 2021, he signed his first professional contract with Wikki Tourists, as then coached by Kabiru Suleiman Dogo.

== Club career ==
=== Wikki Tourists ===
Yusuf began his professional career with Wikki Tourists in 2021, making his debut in the NPFL. He showed potential with his pace, dribbling, and vision, and featured intermittently during the 2021–22 season.

=== Nasarawa United ===
He returned to Nasarawa United in January 2022, working under a series of coaches including Bala Nikyu, Usman Adams, and former Super Eagles manager Salisu Yusuf. His breakthrough came in the 2024–25 season, where he scored 18 goals. This tally included two hat-tricks—against El-Kanemi Warriors and Abia Warriors—and multiple match-winning performances.

Yusuf finished the season as the NPFL's top scorer, winning the Golden Boot. He was also awarded the Eunisell Boot Award, with a cash prize of ₦3.6 million, calculated at ₦200,000 per goal.

=== JS Saoura ===
On 31 January 2026, he joined Algerian club JS Saoura.

== International career ==
In July 2025, Yusuf was selected in the 35-man provisional squad for the 2024 African Nations Championship (CHAN) by Nigeria's Team B (Super Eagles B), managed by Eric Chelle. His inclusion followed a high-scoring domestic campaign. NPFL chairman Gbenga Elegbeleye publicly endorsed Yusuf's potential for future inclusion in Nigeria's main senior team.

== Career statistics ==
=== Club ===
As of match played 4 October 2025

Appearances and goals by club, season and competition
Club	Season	League			National Cup		Continental		Other		Total	
Club	Season	Division	Apps	Goals	Apps	Goals	Apps	Goals	Apps	Goals	Apps	Goals
Nasarawa United	2018	Nigeria Professional Football League	1	0	—		—		—		1	0
Nasarawa United	2019	Nigeria Professional Football League	16	4	—		—		—		16	4
Nasarawa United	2019–20	Nigeria Professional Football League	18	3	—		—		—		18	3
Nasarawa United	2020–21	Nigeria Professional Football League	12	2	—		—		—		12	2
Nasarawa United	Total		47	9	—		—		—		47	9
Wikki Tourists	2021–22	Nigeria Professional Football League	14	2	—		—		—		14	2
Nasarawa United	2022–23	Nigeria Professional Football League	8	1	—		—		—		8	1
Nasarawa United	2024–25	Nigeria Professional Football League	34	18	—		—		—		34	18
Nasarawa United	2025–26	Nigeria Professional Football League	5	1	—		—		—		5	1
Nasarawa United	Total		47	20	—		—		—		47	20
Career total			108	31	0	0	0	0	0	0	108	31

=== International ===
As of match played 19 August 2025

Appearances and goals by national team and year
National team	Year	Apps	Goals
Nigeria	2025	2	1
Total		2	1

Scores and results list Nigeria's goal tally first, score column indicates score after each Yusuf goal.

List of international goals scored by Anas Yusuf
No.	Date	Venue	Opponent	Score	Result	Competition
1	19 August 2025	Benjamin Mkapa Stadium, Miburani, Tanzania	Congo	0–1	0–2	African Nations Championship
