= 2019 Nigeria Professional Football League =

Nigeria Professional Football League
- Season: 2019
- Champions: Enyimba
- Promoted: Remo Stars; Bendel Insurance Delta Force Yobe Desert Stars
- Relegated: None
- Champions League: Enyimba; Kano Pillars
- Confederation Cup: Enugu Rangers; Niger Tornadoes
- Top goalscorer: Mfon Udoh & Sunusi Ibrahim (10 goals)

The 2019 Nigeria Professional Football League was the 29th season of the Nigeria Professional Football League, the top-tier football league in Nigeria, since the rebranding of the league as the "Professional League", and the 48th season of top-division football in Nigeria since its establishment in 1972. The season started on 13 January 2019.

== Teams ==
The league consisted of 24 teams. Four were promoted from the Nigeria National League. Twenty teams remain from the previous season which was not completed. They are divided into two groups of 12 teams. The draw was held on 20 November 2018.

Group A

- Wikki Tourists
- Rivers United
- Enugu Rangers
- Niger Tornadoes
- Lobi Stars
- Katsina United
- Kwara United
- Sunshine Stars
- Enyimba
- MFM
- Remo Stars
- Bendel Insurance

Group B

- Yobe Desert Stars
- Go Round
- Nasarawa United
- Abia Warriors
- Plateau United
- FC Ifeanyi Ubah
- Kano Pillars
- Heartland
- Akwa United
- El Kanemi Warriors
- Delta Force F.C.
- Gombe United

Blue= Group A. Red= Group B

Locations of the Nigeria Professional Football League 2019 teams

== First stage ==
=== Group A ===
| Pos | Team | Pld | W | D | L | GF | GA | GD | Pts | Qualification or relegation |
|---|---|---|---|---|---|---|---|---|---|---|
| 1 | Rangers International (Q) | 22 | 12 | 4 | 6 | 23 | 18 | +5 | 40 | Qualification for Championship playoff |
| 2 | Lobi Stars (Q) | 22 | 8 | 11 | 3 | 22 | 18 | +4 | 35 | Qualification for Championship playoff |
| 3 | Enyimba (Q) | 22 | 8 | 9 | 5 | 22 | 13 | +9 | 33 | Qualification for Championship playoff |
| 4 | MFM | 22 | 9 | 5 | 8 | 22 | 20 | +2 | 32 | |
| 5 | Rivers United | 22 | 8 | 7 | 7 | 18 | 17 | +1 | 31 | |
| 6 | Katsina United | 22 | 9 | 3 | 10 | 24 | 25 | −1 | 30 | |
| 7 | Wikki Tourists | 22 | 9 | 3 | 10 | 22 | 24 | −2 | 30 | |
| 8 | Sunshine Stars | 22 | 8 | 5 | 9 | 23 | 22 | +1 | 29 | |
| 9 | Bendel Insurance (R) | 22 | 6 | 10 | 6 | 13 | 13 | 0 | 28 | Relegation |
| 10 | Kwara United (R) | 22 | 7 | 6 | 9 | 15 | 20 | −5 | 27 | Relegation |
| 11 | Niger Tornadoes (Q, R) | 22 | 4 | 9 | 9 | 14 | 21 | −7 | 21 | Qualification for Confederation Cup and relegation (Note: Niger Tornadoes are Nigeria Federation Cup runners-up (Kano Pillars are cup winners).) |
| 12 | Remo Stars (R) | 22 | 4 | 8 | 10 | 17 | 24 | −7 | 20 | Relegation |

Source: NPFL
(Q) Qualified for the phase indicated; (R) Relegated
Notes:

=== Group B ===
| Pos | Team | Pld | W | D | L | GF | GA | GD | Pts | Qualification or relegation |
|---|---|---|---|---|---|---|---|---|---|---|
| 1 | Akwa United (Q) | 22 | 11 | 5 | 6 | 32 | 24 | +8 | 38 | Qualification for Championship playoff |
| 2 | Kano Pillars (Q) | 22 | 11 | 4 | 7 | 28 | 19 | +9 | 37 | Qualification for Championship playoff |
| 3 | Ifeanyi Ubah (Q) | 22 | 11 | 3 | 8 | 18 | 18 | 0 | 36 | Qualification for Championship playoff |
| 4 | Nasarawa United | 22 | 10 | 3 | 9 | 30 | 28 | +2 | 33 | |
| 5 | Abia Warriors | 22 | 9 | 4 | 9 | 25 | 20 | +5 | 31 | |
| 6 | Heartland | 22 | 9 | 4 | 9 | 25 | 22 | +3 | 31 | |
| 7 | Delta Force (Note: Kada City played the first 11 matches of the season, and then sold their league spot to Delta Force, which took over their record and remaining fixtures.) | 22 | 9 | 4 | 9 | 19 | 26 | −7 | 31 | |
| 8 | Plateau United | 22 | 7 | 9 | 6 | 18 | 14 | +4 | 30 | |
| 9 | Gombe United (R) | 22 | 8 | 6 | 8 | 19 | 19 | 0 | 30 | Relegation |
| 10 | El-Kanemi Warriors (R) | 22 | 9 | 3 | 10 | 21 | 25 | −4 | 30 | Relegation |
| 11 | Go Round (R) | 22 | 7 | 6 | 9 | 16 | 23 | −7 | 27 | Relegation |
| 12 | Yobe Desert Stars (R) | 22 | 4 | 3 | 15 | 11 | 24 | −13 | 15 | Relegation |

Source: NPFL
(Q) Qualified for the phase indicated; (R) Relegated

== Championship playoff ==
| Pos | Grp | Team | Pld | W | D | L | GF | GA | GD | Pts | Qualification or relegation |
|---|---|---|---|---|---|---|---|---|---|---|---|
| 1 | A | Enyimba (C) | 5 | 4 | 0 | 1 | 10 | 4 | +6 | 12 | Qualification for Champions League |
| 2 | B | Kano Pillars (Q) | 5 | 3 | 2 | 0 | 8 | 4 | +4 | 11 | Qualification for Champions League |
| 3 | A | Rangers International (Q) | 5 | 2 | 2 | 1 | 10 | 8 | +2 | 8 | Qualification for Confederation Cup |
| 4 | B | Akwa United | 5 | 1 | 3 | 1 | 7 | 9 | −2 | 6 | |
| 5 | A | Lobi Stars | 5 | 1 | 1 | 3 | 5 | 7 | −2 | 4 | |
| 6 | B | Ifeanyi Ubah | 5 | 0 | 0 | 5 | 6 | 14 | −8 | 0 | |

Source: NPFL
(C) Champions; (Q) Qualified for the phase indicated

== Attendances ==
The clubs in the championship phase by average home league attendance:

| No. | Club | Average |
|---|---|---|
| 1 | Kano Pillars | 11,463 |
| 2 | Rangers International | 9,712 |
| 3 | Enyimba | 3,687 |
| 4 | Ifeanyi Ubah | 1,834 |
| 5 | Akwa United | 472 |
| 6 | Lobi Stars | 351 |
