= Chukwuemeka Obioma =

Nigerian footballer

Personal information
- Full name: Chukwuemeka Obioma
- Date of birth: 20 November 1998 (age 27)
- Place of birth: Nigeria
- Position: Striker

Team information
- Current team: Abia warriors football club

Senior career*
Years	Team	Apps	(Gls)
2019–2020	Heartland	12	(6)
2020–2021	Abia Warriors	25	(11)
2021–2023	Enyimba	51	(23)
2023–2024	Al Bashayer	8	(3)
2024–	Al-Majd	9	(0)
- * Club domestic league appearances and goals

Chukwuemeka Obioma (born 20 November 1998) is a Nigerian professional footballer who plays as a striker for the Nigeria Premier Football League club Abia warriors football club. He won the golden boot in the 2022-23 Nigeria Professional Football League season.

== Club career ==
Obioma joined Heartland in 2019, making 12 appearances and scoring six goals. He also played for Abia Warriors before joining Enyimba.

== Breakout season ==
During the 2022-23 NPFL season, Obioma scored 14 goals in the regular season as Enyimba made the Super Six playoffs.

On 3 June 2023, Obioma scored a penalty against Remo Stars in their first playoff game which ended 2-2.

On 5 June 2023, he scored the only goal against Lobi Stars in their second game.

Obioma failed to score in the third game against Bendel Insurance, picking up an injury that ruled him out of their fourth game of the playoffs against Sunshine Stars. He returned for the title decider against Rivers United on 11 June 2023, which ended 1-1. The draw clinched a record-extending ninth NPFL title for Enyimba, with Obioma finishing the season as the league top scorer. He would also be named Player of the Season at the League Bloggers Awards.

== Honours ==
Enyimba

- Nigeria Premier Football League: 2022–23

Individual

- NPFL Player of the Season: 2022–23
- NPFL Top Goalscorer: 2022-23
