= Olorunleke Ojo =

Nigerian footballer

Personal information
- Birth name: Olorunleke Oluwasegun Ojo
- Date of birth: August 17, 1995 (age 31)
- Place of birth: Kogi State, Nigeria
- Height: 1.89 m (6 ft 2 1/2 in)
- Position: Goalkeeper

Youth career
- Voice of Nigeria FC

Senior career*
Years	Team	Apps	(Gls)
2013–2014	Giwa		
2014–2017	Kano Pillars		
2017–2019	Akwa United		
2019–2020	Sunshine Stars		
2020–2021	Abia Warriors		
2021–2024	Enyimba		
2024-2025	Al-Merrikh SC		
2025–present	Welwalo Adigrat University FC		

International career^{‡}
2015	Nigeria U20	2	(0)
2023–	Nigeria	0	(0)
Medal record
Men's football
Representing Nigeria
Africa Cup of Nations
Runner-up	2023 Ivory Coast
- * Club domestic league appearances and goals ‡ National team caps and goals as of 20:00, 11 February 2023 (UTC)

Olorunleke Oluwasegun Ojo MON (born 17 August 1995) is a Nigerian professional footballer who plays as a goalkeeper for Welwalo Adigrat University FC, and the Nigeria national team.

== Career ==
Ojo began his senior career with Giwa in 2013, and helped them win the Nigeria National League and achieve promotion to the Nigeria Professional Football League in his debut season. He moved to Kano Pillars on 9 December 2014. He transferred to Akwa United in 2017, where he won the 2017 Nigeria Federation Cup and was given the MVP and Best Goalkeeper award for the cup. In 2019, he moved to Sunshine Stars. After a season there, he had another year-long stint with Abia Warriors starting on 14 August 2020. In 2021, he transferred to Enyimba, and eventually helped them win the 2022–23 Nigeria Professional Football League. On 3 August 2023, he was named the captain at Enyimba.

== International ==
Ojo is a former youth international for Nigeria, and was called up to the Nigeria U20s for the 2015 African U-20 Championship where they became champions. In May 2018, he was called up to the Nigeria B national team for a friendly against Atlético de Madrid. In May 2022, he received his first call-up to the senior Nigeria national team. He made the final squad for the 2023 Africa Cup of Nations, where he was the only player called up from the Nigeria Professional Football League.

== Personal life ==
In November 2016, Ojo married his wife Tosin Ojo, then manager, secretary and media manager of the women's football team Confluence Queens F.C.

== Honours ==
Giwa

- Nigeria National League: 2013

Akwa United

- Nigeria Federation Cup: 2017

Enyimba

- Nigeria Professional Football League: 2022–23

Nigeria U20

- African U-20 Championship: 2015

Nigeria

- Africa Cup of Nations runner-up: 2023

Orders

- Member of the Order of the Niger
