= Stephen Odey =

Nigerian footballer (born 1998)

Personal information
- Full name: Stephen Pius Odey
- Date of birth: 15 January 1998 (age 28)
- Place of birth: Lagos, Nigeria
- Height: 1.73 m (5 ft 8 in)
- Position: Forward

Team information
- Current team: Debreceni VSC
- Number: 90

Senior career*
Years	Team	Apps	(Gls)
2016–2017	MFM	42	(23)
2017–2019	Zürich	45	(12)
2019–2022	Genk	11	(0)
2020–2021	→ Amiens (loan)	28	(6)
2021–2022	→ Randers (loan)	23	(7)
2022–2025	Randers FC	89	(9)
2026–	Debrecen	1	(0)

International career^{‡}
2017–	Nigeria	3	(0)
- * Club domestic league appearances and goals as of 30 May 2026 ‡ National team caps and goals as of 18 August 2018

Stephen Pius Odey (born 15 January 1998) is a Nigerian professional footballer who last played as a forward for Hungarian NB I club Debrecen.

== Club career ==
Odey played in the second edition of GTBank-Lagos state principals cup where he was the captain of the winning Dairy Farm Senior secondary school Agege. He also topped the list of the GTBank 13-man all star team of that year. He trained at CampGTBank with 23 other students under lead coach Mark Elis, former coach at Arsenal.

He is the all-time top scorer for MFM in the Nigerian Professional Football League, the highest football league level in Nigeria. Odey was the highest goalscorer for MFM in the 2015–16 season. He scored his first career hat-trick in January 2017 against Lobi Stars.

On 4 October 2017, Odey completed a transfer to Swiss club FC Zürich.

On 28 June 2019, it was confirmed that Odey had joined Genk on a five-year contract. On 11 September 2020, he joined Ligue 2 club Amiens SC on loan. On 31 August 2021, he joined Danish club Randers FC on loan for the 2021-22 season with an option to buy. After scoring five goals in seven games Randers confirmed on 21 November 2021, that they had bought Odey free from Genk at the end of his loan deal, becoming the most expensive transfer in Randers' history. Odey signed a deal until June 2024, running from the 2022-23 season.

On 8 December 2025, Randers FC announced that Odey is going to leave the club on 31 December 2025, when his contract expires.

On 27 February 2026, Odey completed a transfer to Hungarian club Debreceni VSC.

== International career ==
On 13 August 2017, Odey made his debut for Nigeria, as a substitute, in a 1–0 loss against Benin.

== Honours ==
Individual

- Player of the Month, NPFL League Bloggers Awards: January 2017
- Player of the Month, NPFL League Bloggers Awards: March 2017

FC Zürich

- Swiss Cup: 2017–18
