= 2023–24 Nigeria Premier Football League =

Nigerian association football season

Nigeria Premier Football League
- Season: 2023–24
- Dates: 30 September 2023 – 23 June 2024
- Champions: Enugu Rangers (8th title)
- Relegated: Sporting Lagos; Doma United; Heartland; Gombe United
- Champions League: Enugu Rangers; Remo Stars
- Confederation Cup: Enyimba
- Matches: 380
- Goals: 848 (2.23 per match)
- Top goalscorer: Chijioke Mbaoma (17 goals)
- Biggest home win: Rivers United 6–0 Gombe United (15 June 2024)
- Biggest away win: Heartland 1–5 Plateau United (28 February 2024)
- Highest scoring: Bayelsa United 5–3 Akwa United (30 September 2023)
- Longest winning run: Enugu Rangers (5 matches)
- Longest unbeaten run: Enugu Rangers (10 matches)
- Longest winless run: Heartland (11 matches)
- Longest losing run: Gombe United (6 matches)
- Highest attendance: 44,000; Enugu Rangers 3–0 Enyimba (9 June 2024)
- Average attendance: 2,867
- All statistics correct as of 23 June 2024.

The 2023–24 Nigeria Premier Football League was the 53rd season of Nigeria's top-flight association football league, the 34th since attaining professionalism and the first under the current name. The season commenced on 30 September 2023 after initial delays.

Enyimba were the defending champions, after finishing top of the Championship round at the previous season. On 17 June 2024, Enugu Rangers won their eighth NPFL title with a game to spare.

This season sees the Interim Management Committee (IMC) entering into a partnership with technology firm GTI Investment, Propel Sports Africa and MTN to sponsor the league, with an exclusive broadcast right that shall cover eight live games every weekend and 300 throughout the season. Thus, this makes the NPFL the first African football league to deploy artificial intelligence at games.

This season also sees an increase of N50 million in prize money for the champions. Also, The NPFL secured $1 Billion Broadcast sponsorship deal with Chinese satellite provider StarTimes, for five years.

== Teams ==
Twenty teams are competing in the league – the top sixteen teams from the previous season and the four teams promoted from the Nigeria National League. The promoted teams are Heartland, Sporting Lagos, Kano Pillars and Katsina United. This is Sporting Lagos's first season in the Nigeria Professional Football League. With their promotion, Sporting Lagos became the first team to have been promoted after the first season of their creation. Heartland, Katsina United and Kano Pillars also returned to the top-flight after getting relegated two seasons ago. They replaced Wikki Tourists, Nasarawa United, El-Kanemi Warriors and Dakkada, who were relegated to the Nigeria National League.

=== Teams information ===
Locations of the 2023–24 Nigeria Premier Football League teams

Team	Location	Kit Supplier	Shirt Sponsor	Stadium	Capacity
Abia Warriors	Umuahia	Owu	Eunisell	Umuahia Township Stadium; Enyimba International Stadium (Note: Abia Warriors played some of their games at Aba as their original stadium failed to meet the requirements.)	5,000
Akwa United	Uyo	Owu	1xBet	Godswill Akpabio Stadium; Eket Stadium	30,000; 18,000
Bayelsa United	Yenagoa	GDF	_	Samson Siasia Stadium	5,000
Bendel Insurance	Benin City	Fourteen	Sterling Bank	Samuel Ogbemudia Stadium	12,000
Doma United	Gombe	Cone Sport	_	Pantami Stadium	12,000
Enugu Rangers	Enugu	Cone Sport	Afrinvest, Shopurban, Senior Barman	Nnamdi Azikiwe Stadium	22,000
Enyimba	Aba	KK	Stake.com, United Nigeria Airlines	Enyimba International Stadium	16,000
Gombe United	Gombe	Cone Sport	_	Pantami Stadium	12,000
Heartland	Owerri	_	_	Dan Anyiam Stadium; Awka City Stadium (Note: Heartland played their second round games at Awka.)	10,000
Kano Pillars	Kano	Play	Rambo	Sani Abacha Stadium	16,000
Katsina United	Katsina	Owu	_	Muhammadu Dikko Stadium	35,000
Kwara United	Ilorin	Owu	_	Kwara State Stadium	18,000
Lobi Stars	Makurdi	Owu	_	Lafia Township Stadium (Note: Lobi Stars played their home matches at Lafia Township Stadium, Lafia instead of Aper Aku Stadium, Makurdi due to renovation works.)	10,000
Niger Tornadoes	Minna	Cone Sport	_	Ahmadu Bello Stadium (Note: Niger Tornadoes home stadium was not approved, so they play in their adopted home in Kaduna.)	16,000
Plateau United	Jos	Kapspor	_	New Jos Stadium	60,000
Remo Stars	Ikenne	Cone Sport	Bet9ja	Remo Stars Stadium	5,000
Rivers United	Port Harcourt	Owu	_	Adokiye Amiesimaka Stadium	40,000
Shooting Stars	Ibadan	Cone Sport	Peculiar	Adamasingba Stadium	10,000
Sporting Lagos	Lagos	Umbro	Klasha, Choplife	Onikan Stadium	10,000
Sunshine Stars	Akure	Cone Sport	_	Akure Township Stadium	5,000

== League table ==
Pos	Team	Pld	W	D	L	GF	GA	GD	Pts	
1	Enugu Rangers (C)	38	21	7	10	56	33	+23	70	Qualification for the Champions League
2	Remo Stars	38	20	5	13	53	39	+14	65	Qualification for the Champions League
3	Enyimba	38	19	6	13	46	33	+13	63	Qualification for the Confederation Cup
4	Shooting Stars	38	18	8	12	48	34	+14	62	
5	Plateau United	38	18	4	16	53	40	+13	58	
6	Lobi Stars	38	17	7	14	48	45	+3	58	
7	Katsina United	38	15	10	13	42	39	+3	55	
8	Rivers United	38	15	8	15	51	42	+9	53	
9	Bendel Insurance	38	14	11	13	32	30	+2	53	
10	Sunshine Stars	38	13	13	12	37	37	0	52	
11	Kano Pillars	38	15	7	16	49	50	−1	52	
12	Abia Warriors	38	15	7	16	42	45	−3	52	
13	Kwara United	38	12	15	11	38	37	+1	51	
14	Niger Tornadoes	38	14	9	15	38	41	−3	51	
15	Bayelsa United	38	13	11	14	46	50	−4	50	
16	Akwa United	38	14	7	17	44	42	+2	49	
17	Sporting Lagos (R)	38	12	10	16	39	44	−5	46	Relegation to the National League
18	Doma United (R)	38	11	11	16	26	42	−16	44	Relegation to the National League
19	Heartland (R)	38	9	11	18	36	50	−14	38	Relegation to the National League
20	Gombe United (Note: Gombe United were deducted 6 points and 6 goals.) (R)	38	8	7	23	21	78	−57	25	Relegation to the National League

Source: NPFL
Rules for classification: 1) points; 2) goal difference; 3) number of goals scored
(C) Champions; (R) Relegated

== Results ==
Home \ Away	ABW	AKW	BAY	BEN	DOM	ENU	ENY	GOM	HEA	KAN	KAT	KWA	LOB	NIG	PLA	REM	RIV	3SC	SPL	SUN
Abia Warriors		2–0	1–0	0–0	3–0	1–0	0–1	3–1	1–0	1–0	2–1	1–0	1–1	1–0	1–0	0–0	2–0	3–2	1–1	0–0
Akwa United	3–1		0–1	3–1	0–1	1–0	3–1	1–0	2–0	3–0	3–1	1–1	1–0	4–1	0–0	3–2	3–1	0–0	0–0	0–0
Bayelsa United	2–2	5–3		2–0	2–0	2–0	1–2	2–0	1–0	2–1	1–1	2–1	1–2	0–1	3–2	1–2	2–1	2–1	2–2	1–1
Bendel Insurance	1–0	0–0	0–2		4–0	2–0	0–0	2–0	1–0	2–1	2–0	2–2	1–0	1–3	1–0	1–0	2–1	2–0	3–1	1–0
Doma United	1–1	1–0	2–0	0–0		0–1	1–0	1–1	1–0	1–0	2–0	0–0	1–0	1–0	1–0	1–1	1–1	0–1	0–0	0–1
Enugu Rangers	3–2	1–0	3–0	2–0	2–1		3–0	4–1	2–0	4–1	0–0	0–0	2–1	2–1	2–0	1–0	1–0	2–0	2–0	2–0
Enyimba	2–1	3–2	1–1	2–1	0–0	1–1		4–0	1–0	5–0	1–0	1–0	1–0	3–1	2–0	0–1	4–1	1–0	2–0	1–0
Gombe United	1–3	1–1	1–1	1–0	0–3	1–2	2–0		2–0	2–5	1–0	1–2	3–2	1–0	1–0	0–0	1–1	1–1	2–0	0–2
Heartland	2–0	1–0	2–2	1–0	3–1	1–2	0–1	3–0		1–1	1–1	1–1	2–2	1–0	1–5	3–1	1–1	1–0	3–1	1–1
Kano Pillars	0–1	1–0	3–0	0–0	3–1	1–1	1–0	4–0	2–1		1–0	2–1	3–2	1–1	2–1	2–1	1–0	1–2	1–0	5–1
Katsina United	2–1	1–0	1–1	1–0	2–0	4–3	2–1	4–0	1–1	3–2		1–0	0–0	1–0	2–1	2–0	1–0	2–2	2–0	3–2
Kwara United	1–0	1–0	1–0	1–1	0–0	1–1	2–1	2–0	4–0	2–0	1–1		0–2	0–0	2–1	3–2	0–0	1–1	2–1	1–0
Lobi Stars	2–0	1–2	1–1	0–0	2–1	2–1	1–0	1–0	1–0	1–1	2–0	4–3		1–0	2–1	3–2	3–2	2–1	1–0	3–2
Niger Tornadoes	1–0	1–0	1–0	0–0	2–0	0–2	0–0	5–0	3–2	1–0	0–0	1–1	3–2		2–3	0–0	1–0	2–1	1–0	2–1
Plateau United	3–1	1–2	5–1	2–0	4–0	2–1	1–0	4–0	1–0	1–1	1–0	2–0	2–1	0–0		1–0	3–2	0–0	1–0	1–0
Remo Stars	2–1	2–1	1–0	2–0	0–0	2–1	1–0	4–0	4–1	2–1	2–1	2–0	2–0	3–0	1–0		2–1	3–0	2–1	2–0
Rivers United	2–1	2–1	2–0	1–1	3–2	2–0	2–0	6–0	1–0	1–1	2–0	0–0	1–0	3–2	3–1	2–0		1–0	4–1	1–1
Shooting Stars	4–0	3–0	1–0	1–0	3–1	1–0	1–2	2–1	0–0	1–0	1–1	2–0	2–0	4–1	2–1	2–0	1–0		1–0	2–0
Sporting Lagos	4–2	2–1	1–1	1–0	0–0	0–0	2–1	2–0	1–1	3–0	1–0	2–0	1–1	2–1	1–2	4–1	1–0	2–2		1–0
Sunshine Stars	2–1	2–0	1–1	0–0	2–0	2–2	1–1	1–1	1–1	1–0	1–0	1–1	2–0	0–0	3–1	2–1	1–0	1–0	1–0	

Source: NPFL
Legend: Blue = home team win; Yellow = draw; Red = away team win.

== Positions by round ==
To preserve chronological evolvements, any postponed matches are not included to the round at which they were originally scheduled, but added to the full round they were played immediately afterwards. For example, if a match is scheduled for round 7, but then played between rounds 8 and 9, it will be added to the standings for round 8.

Team ╲ Round	1	2	3	4	5	6	7	8	9	10	11	12	13	14	15	16	17	18	19	20	21	22	23	24	25	26	27	28	29	30	31	32	33	34	35	36	37	38
Abia Warriors	5	12	3	10	5	8	5	9	12	7	8	8	9	8	8	8	8	9	10	11	11	10	8	10	10	10	10	9	11	12	11	11	12	13	14	13	10	12
Akwa United	19	18	20	20	20	16	17	18	17	18	17	18	16	17	18	19	16	18	16	16	19	19	18	19	17	18	17	18	18	18	18	18	15	14	15	14	16	16
Bayelsa United	1	6	13	19	11	17	19	19	18	19	19	20	17	20	19	20	20	19	19	18	16	14	15	15	18	15	18	15	15	15	17	16	18	18	17	16	15	15
Bendel Insurance	10	3	1	5	9	13	7	7	6	8	6	7	5	7	4	7	6	7	7	8	8	9	10	8	9	9	9	10	10	8	9	8	10	7	9	7	9	9
Doma United	14	4	8	14	16	18	12	4	1	3	2	3	2	3	2	3	3	4	3	6	7	8	9	11	12	13	13	11	12	13	14	15	17	16	18	18	18	18
Enugu Rangers	3	7	2	3	1	3	2	3	5	6	9	12	12	10	9	9	9	10	8	7	6	4	3	4	3	2	1	1	1	1	1	1	1	1	1	1	1	1
Enyimba	11	20	14	18	18	19	16	17	8	5	4	5	4	5	5	4	4	5	5	3	4	1	5	2	5	3	4	2	4	2	2	3	2	2	2	3	3	3
Gombe United	20	9	15	6	4	6	11	15	14	16	16	17	14	15	12	14	13	15	18	19	17	18	17	18	19	19	20	20	20	20	20	20	20	20	20	20	20	20
Heartland	8	17	19	17	19	20	20	20	20	20	20	19	20	18	20	17	19	20	20	20	20	20	20	20	20	20	19	19	19	19	19	19	19	19	19	19	19	19
Kano Pillars	16	11	18	9	14	5	10	8	13	13	7	4	8	6	7	6	5	6	4	5	3	6	6	6	6	7	6	8	8	9	8	10	9	10	10	10	12	11
Katsina United	6	13	12	13	8	15	14	11	11	12	14	15	16	11	15	11	12	8	9	9	9	7	7	7	8	8	7	7	7	7	7	7	7	8	7	8	7	7
Kwara United	17	14	11	12	11	12	15	14	16	9	11	13	13	14	11	12	14	16	13	14	13	16	16	17	15	17	15	16	16	14	12	14	11	11	13	11	13	13
Lobi Stars	9	2	7	2	6	2	1	1	2	1	3	2	3	2	3	2	2	1	1	2	1	2	1	1	1	1	2	3	2	3	3	5	5	5	5	6	6	6
Niger Tornadoes	18	15	16	7	12	15	18	16	19	17	18	16	19	19	16	18	15	14	17	17	15	17	19	16	14	16	14	12	9	10	10	12	13	12	12	12	14	14
Plateau United	15	10	17	8	13	7	8	6	7	10	12	10	6	4	6	5	7	3	6	4	5	3	2	3	2	4	5	5	5	6	4	6	6	6	6	5	5	5
Remo Stars	12	5	5	1	3	1	4	2	4	2	1	1	1	1	1	1	1	2	2	1	2	5	4	5	4	5	3	4	3	4	5	2	3	3	3	2	2	2
Rivers United	13	19	9	15	10	10	9	12	10	15	15	15	18	16	17	16	17	13	12	10	10	12	13	14	16	14	16	17	17	17	15	9	8	9	8	9	8	8
Shooting Stars	4	16	4	4	2	4	3	5	3	4	5	6	7	9	10	13	10	11	11	12	12	11	11	9	7	6	8	6	6	5	6	4	4	4	4	4	4	4
Sporting Lagos	2	1	6	11	7	9	6	10	9	14	10	9	10	12	14	15	18	17	15	13	14	13	12	12	13	11	11	13	13	11	13	13	14	17	16	17	17	17
Sunshine Stars	7	8	10	16	17	14	13	13	15	11	13	11	11	11	13	10	11	12	14	15	18	15	14	13	11	12	12	14	14	16	16	17	16	15	11	15	11	10

Leader
Champions League
Confederation Cup
Relegation to Nigeria National League

Source: World Football

== Statistics ==
=== Top scorers ===
As of 23 June 2024

Rank	Player	Club	Goals
1	(Nigeria) Chijioke Mbaoma	Enyimba	17
2	(Nigeria) Sikiru Alimi	Remo Stars	15
3	(Nigeria) Albert Hilary	Plateau United	12
3	(Nigeria) Jonathan Alukwu	Sporting Lagos	12
3	(Nigeria) Godwin Obaje	Enugu Rangers	12
3	(Nigeria) Hashiri Usman	Niger Tornadoes	12
7	(Nigeria) Ibrahim Mustapha	Kano Pillars	11
7	(Nigeria) Suleman Sani	Akwa United	11
7	(Nigeria) Ubong Friday	Akwa United	11
11	(Nigeria) Robert Mizo	Bayelsa United	10
11	(Nigeria) Rabiu Ali	Kano Pillars	10
11	(Nigeria) Michael Okoro Ibe	Katsina United	10
11	(Nigeria) Christian Pyagbara	Shooting Stars	10

=== Hat-tricks ===
Player	For	Against	Score	Date	Ref(s)
(Nigeria) Robert Mizo	Bayelsa United	Akwa United	5–3 (H)	30 September 2023	
(Nigeria) Yusuf Abdullahi^{5}	Kano Pillars	Gombe United	5–2 (A)	3 December 2023	
(Nigeria) Albert Hilary	Plateau United	Bayelsa United	5–1 (H)	17 December 2023	
(Nigeria) Nyima Nwagua	Rivers United	Doma United	3–2 (H)	18 February 2024	

Notes

^{5} Player scored 5 goals
(H) – Home team
(A) – Away team

== Monthly awards ==
Month	Player of the Month		Manager of the Month		Ref.
Month	Player	Club	Manager	Club	Ref.
September/October	(Nigeria) Robert Mizo	Bayelsa United	(Nigeria) Daniel Ogunmodede	Remo Stars	
November	(Nigeria) Kingdom Osayi	Doma United	(Nigeria) Akinade Onigbinde	Doma United	
December	(Nigeria) Albert Hilary	Plateau United	(Nigeria) Mbwas Mangut	Plateau United	
February	(Nigeria) Ibrahim Mustapha	Kano Pillars	(Nigeria) Meremu Okara	Bayelsa United	
March	(Nigeria) Suleman Sani	Akwa United	(Nigeria) Fidelis Ilechukwu	Enugu Rangers	
April	(Nigeria) Clinton Jephta	Niger Tornadoes	(Nigeria) Gbenga Ogunbote	Shooting Stars	

== Attendances ==
Rangers International drew the highest average home attendance in the 2023-24 edition of the NPFL. Numerous NPFL games took place in front of capacity crowds.

#	Football club	Average attendance
1	Rangers International	20,672
2	Kano Pillars	8,894
3	Kwara United	5,368
4	Shooting Stars	4,421
5	Niger Tornadoes	4,300
6	Enyimba FC	3,496
7	Doma United	2,852
8	Plateau United	1,982
9	Sporting Lagos	1,180
10	Heartland FC	800
11	Remo Stars	706
12	Sunshine Stars	572
13	Lobi Stars	448
14	Gombe United	438
15	Bendel Insurance	320
16	Bayelsa United	226
17	Abia Warriors	224
18	Katsina United	194
19	Akwa United	135
20	Rivers United	104
