= Mfon Udoh =

Nigerian footballer (born 1992)

Personal information
- Date of birth: 14 March 1992 (age 34)
- Place of birth: Lagos, Nigeria
- Height: 1.72 m (5 ft 8 in)
- Position: Forward

Youth career
- Diamond Stars

Senior career*
Years	Team	Apps	(Gls)
2011–2012	Calabar Rovers	10	(8)
2012–2013	Akwa United	34	(16)
2013–2018	Enyimba	76	(39)
2018–2019	Akwa United	27	(17)
2020	FC Tulsa	4	(0)
2020–2021	Akwa United	6	(1)
2021–2022	Saif Sporting Club	17	(11)
2022–2023	Sheikh Russel KC	12	(11)
2023–2024	Bashundhara Kings	3	(3)
2025	Brothers Union	8	(4)

International career^{‡}
2014–	Nigeria	3	(1)
- * Club domestic league appearances and goals as of 27 May 2025 ‡ National team caps and goals as of 14 September 2019

Mfon Udoh (born 14 March 1992) is a Nigerian professional footballer who last played as a forward for Bangladesh Premier League club Brothers Union. He has been described as a complete forward who possesses pace, good positioning, natural finishing as well as the ability to provide assists. He is a "fox in the box" type of player, difficult to stop once in the penalty area. He currently holds the record for highest number of goals scored in the Nigerian Premier Football League in a single season. He is also the first player to score over 35 goals in two consecutive seasons in Nigeria. Between 2012 and 2014, he scored 39 goals in the regular league and 3 in national cup competitions, for a total of 41 goals in two seasons. He was the highest goal scorer in the 2016 CAF champions league with nine goals and was all scored in the group stage of the competition.

== Club career ==
=== Early career ===
Mfon began his youth career with Diamond Stars Academy then at Calabar (UNICEM) Rovers of the Nigeria National League, the former youth club of Finidi George. He would go on to score 8 goals in his first season for the Rovers in 2011–2012 season, finishing as their top marksman in all competitions.

=== Akwa United ===
In the 2012–2013 season he transferred to Akwa United F.C., his hometown club in the Nigerian Premier Division. On 31 March 2013 few weeks after turning twenty years, he scored his first ever goal at the top level of Nigerian football. On 3 August 2013 he received the League Bloggers Award for the best player during the month of July. He would go on to complete the regular season with 16 goals to his name, among them 8 crucial away goals to help 'the Promise Keepers' escape relegation. He finished the season once more as the top marksman for his club and 3rd highest overall in the league. The performances by the then 20-year-old attracted the attention of top clubs in the league, among them two-time African champions Enyimba.

=== Enyimba ===
==== 2013-2014 ====
After his first NPFL season, Udoh transferred to Enyimba, two time winners of the CAF Champions League, for an undisclosed fee. He was assigned the number 10 shirt and registered for both the Nigerian NPFL and African Champions League competitions. Ahead of the season, he stated a personal target of scoring 20 league goals. Udoh surpassed that target, scoring 23 goals during the campaign and breaking the previous league scoring record as Enyimba finished second in the league table. He became the first player in the history of the Nigerian league to score more than 20 goals in a single league season. During the season, he received several Player of the Week awards and scored six braces, including two goals against Kano Pillars in Enyimba’s final league match. At the end of the campaign, he won the NPFL Golden Boot, the NPFL Player of the Season award, and the League Bloggers Player of the Season award.

==== 2014-2015 ====
Mfon scored the only goal in the 1–0 win over Bayelsa Utd to give Enyimba their first league win of the season. He would then score a trademark goal against Taraba Utd by capitalizing on lapse in communication between the defenders to give Enyimba a crucial away win. In the game against Sharks in Aba, Mfon scored a brace to bring his tally to 4 goals. Following injury, Mfon was unavailable for matches until the last few games of the season. He scored the only goal through a superb solo-run in a crucial away derby against Abia Warriors, to help Enyimba win the 2015 NPFL season with a game to spare.

==== 2016 ====
After electing to remain with Enyimba for the 2016 season, Mfon scored a brace in the second leg of the 2016 CAF Champions league qualifying game against Vipers FC. He scored another brace in the next round of the competition against Vital'o FC in an assured 5–1 home victory in Aba. In the final qualifying round, Udoh netted a hat-trick in the first leg against Etoile du Sahel for a convincing 3–0 win in Aba. With new coach Paul Aigbogun using a different tactical approach for the NPFL, Udoh was deployed as a right-winger (RW) in league games. Combined with injuries and reduced appearances upfront he suffered his first scoring drought of his career. Incidentally, with Enyimba's elimination from the CAF Champions league, Mfon's form improved as he scored on matchdays 33 & 35. To somewhat vindicate his local form, he ended the season as the top scorer in the CAF champions league with a total of 9 goals. His feat in the continental competition led to his nomination for the award of CAF African footballer of the year at the end of 2016.

==== 2017 ====
Following the departure of Chinedu Udoji to Kano Pillars in December 2016, Mfon Udoh was named the captain of Enyimba F.C.

On 14 September 2018, he announced his departure after seeing off his contract with the club.

=== Akwa United ===
Mfon Udoh joined Akwa United for the 2018–19 NPFL season where he helped them finish fourth at the Super 6.

=== FC Tulsa ===
On 14 January 2020, USL Championship side FC Tulsa announced the signing of Mfon Udoh alongside Solomon Kwambe from Lobi Stars. He made his league debut against Austin Bold but ended up making just four appearances for the American club.

=== Return to Akwa United ===
Udoh rejoined his hometown club Akwa United in December 2020 and marked his return with a goal in a 2–1 loss to Heartland in the 2020–21 season.

== International career ==
In November 2014 he was called up to a friendly game between Nigerian and Ghanaian home-based teams. He made his first appearance for the national team as a 45th-minute substitute.

== Career statistics ==
Scores and results list Nigeria's goal tally first.

No	Date	Venue	Opponent	Score	Result	Competition
1.	17 January 2015	The Sevens Stadium, Dubai, United Arab Emirates	Yemen	1–0	2–0	Friendly

== Honours ==
Enyimba

- Nigeria Professional Football League: 2015
- Aiteo Cup: 2014

Individual

- Nigerian Premier League top scorer: 2013–14
- Enyimba top scorer: 2013–14
- Nigerian League Bloggers (Monthly) Award: August 2013
- NPFL Player of the Year Award: 2014
- Nigerian League Bloggers Awards Player of the Season: 2014, 2019
- CAF Champions League 2016 top scorer (9 goals): 2016
