= Yemi Daniel Olanrewaju =

Nigerian footballer and coach

Personal information
- Date of birth: 2 May 1992 (age 34)
- Place of birth: Lagos, Nigeria
- Position: Midfielder

Team information
- Current team: Rivers United FC (Chief coach)

Senior career*
Years	Team	Apps	(Gls)
2010–2011	Kwara United		
2011–2012	Ocean Boys		
2012–2013	Crown FC		
2013–2014	Kizitepe		

Managerial career
- 2019: Magate F.C.
- 2019–2021: MFM FC
- 2022: Nigeria under-17 (assistant)
- 2022: Vandrezzer
- 2022–2024: Enyimba FC (Assistant coach)
- 2024: Enyimba FC (Interim Head coach)
- 2024: Enyimba FC (Head coach)
- 2025–till date: Rivers United (Chief coach)
- * Club domestic league appearances and goals

Yemi Daniel Olanrewaju (born 2 May 1992) also known as Yema is a Nigerian professional football coach and former player who played as a midfielder. He was appointed the head coach of Enyimba FC in 2024. He is currently the Chief coach of Rivers United FC.

== Playing career ==
He made appearances in the first tier division in Nigerian football, the Nigeria Professional Football League for Kwara United FC, Ocean Boys FC, and Crown FC. Abroad, he played for Turkish club Kizitepe.

In 2014, at the age of 22, Yema was forced to early retirement due to knee injury sustained while playing for ocean boys.

== Coaching career ==
In 2019, Yema was appointed coach of third-division side Magate FC. Later that year, he joined MFM FC as assistant coach to Tony Bolus. In 2022 he became assistant coach to Nduka Ugbade for the Nigeria U17 national team and was also named coach of Nigeria National League side, Vandrezzer FC.

In September 2022 when Finidi George was announced as Enyimba's coach, he handpicked Yema as his assistant. They won a record-extending 9th Nigeria Premier League title for Enyimba.

In May 2024 when Finidi resigned from his position at Enyimba after he was appointed as coach of Nigeria's national football team, Yema was appointed as interim head coach of the team till the end of the season. In August 2024, Yemi was confirmed as the permanent head coach of Enyimba. In December 2024, after a run of poor results, he was dismissed by the club.

In June 2025, he reçonnected with his former boss, Finidi George at Rivers United as Chief Coach.

== Honours ==
Enyimba

- Nigeria Professional Football League: 2022–23 (assistant manager)
