= 2023 Nigeria Federation Cup =

75th edition of the Nigeria FA Cup

2023 Federation Cup
Tingo Cup

Tournament details
- Country: Nigeria
- Dates: 18 April – 21 June 2023
- Teams: 72

Final positions
- Champions: Bendel Insurance
- Runners-up: Enugu Rangers

The 2023 Nigeria Federation Cup (known as the 2023 Tingo Cup) is the 75th edition of the Nigerian Federation Cup. The tournament began with the National playoffs on 18 April and concluded with the final in June.

This year's format remained the same as previous editions, with 72 clubs qualifying as the finalists of the various states tournaments.

== Format ==
The competition is a single elimination knockout tournament featuring the 36 finalists of each state tournaments plus the FCT. The 16 weakest clubs enter the play-off round, the winners then join the remaining 56 teams at the main tournament. All matches are played at neutral stadiums.

Matches are played 90 minutes with tied games at the end of regulation time going straight to penalties.

== National play-offs ==
All matches were played on 18 April.

Team 1	Score	Team 2
Novia FC	? ?	Ashana FC
Katukan Tsafe FC	? ?	Yelwa United
Smart City Feeders	0–2	Bendel Insurance Feeders
Kogi United Feeders	? ?	Lautai FC
FR Eburuaja	1–0	PCM FC
Osevan FC	? ?	Ahudiya FC
Red and Black FC	? ?	Edel FC
ABJ FC	? ?	Nya-Sa Gwang

== First round ==
The draw for this round was conducted on 19 April. Matches were held between 27 April to 3 May

Team 1	Score	Team 2
Heartland	2–0	Jedo FC
Bayelsa United	1–1 (3–5 p)	Essien Ayi
Ahudiya FC	1–0	Jigawa Golden Stars
ABS	0–1	Bendel Insurance
Standard FC	2–2 (4–3 p)	Ekiti United
FC Basira	0–2	Sunshine Stars
EFCC FC	4–2	Katukan Tsafe Fc
Wikki Tourists	0–1	Akwa United
Warri Wolves	4–0	Beyond Limit
Shooting Stars	4–3	Adamimogo
Mighty Jets	w/o	Niger Tornadoes Feeders
Malumfashi	0–1	Gombe United
Bendel Insurance Feeders	4–0	Maikunkele
Cynosure FC	1–0	Kano Pillars Juniors
Lobi Stars	2–2 (5–3 p)	One Rocket
Jama United	w/o	Plateau United
Ingas FC	3–0	Novia FC
El-Kanemi Warriors	2–0	De Cardinal
Nasarawa United	2–0	Kebbi United
DMD FC	2–0	ABJ FC
Ikorodu City	3–0	Crusader FC
Gateway United	1–1 (2–4 p)	Kwara United
Ebedei	3–0	Hope of Glory
Yobe Desert Stars	1–1 (6–7 p)	Igbajo
Adamawa United	w/o	Enugu Rangers
Ilaji	w/o	Kano Pillars
Green Berets	2–3	FR Eburuaja
Ozalla	0–3	Doma United
Kogi United Feeders	1–4	Edel FC
Mailantarki	0–0 (8–7 p)	Kogi United
Rivers United	0–0 (4–5 p)	Enyimba

== Second round ==
Team 1	Score	Team 2
Ahudiya FC	0–1	Bendel Insurance
Cynosure FC	0–2	Lobi Stars
Ebedei	4–0	Igbajo
Edel FC	1–0	Milantarki
EFCC FC	1–1 (9–8 p)	Akwa United
Enugu Rangers	2–0	Kano Pillars
Ikorodu City	1–3	Kwara United
Ingas FC	1–1 (9–8 p)	El-Kanemi Warriors
Mighty Jets	0–2	Gombe United
Nasarawa United	3–2	DMD FC
Osun United	1–2	Bendel Insurance Feeders
Plateau United	2–2 (3–2 p)	Enyimba
Standard FC	0–2	Sunshine Stars
Warri Wolves	0–0 (4–3 p)	Shooting Stars
FR Eburuaja	0–4	Doma United
Heartland	2–1	Essien Ayi

== Third round ==
The third round of matches were played on 24 and 25 May.

Team 1	Score	Team 2
24 May 2023
Warri Wolves	1–0	Gombe United
Sunshine Stars	3–2	EFCC FC
Heartland	0–1	Bendel Insurance
Ebedei	1–3	Enugu Rangers
Plateau United	2–1	Ingas FC
Nasarawa United	0–1	Kwara United
Doma United	2–1	Edel
25 May 2023
Bendel Insurance Feeders	1–3	Lobi Stars

== Quarter-final ==
Matches were played on 28 May.

Team 1	Score	Team 2
Enugu Rangers	1–0	Doma United
Plateau United	1–0	Kwara United
Warri Wolves	2–1	Lobi Stars
Bendel Insurance	1–0	Sunshine Stars

28 May 2023	Bendel Insurance	1–0	Sunshine Stars	Awka City Stadium, Awka
12:00 (UTC+1)	Osarenkhoe 56'

28 May 2023	Warri Wolves	2–1	Lobi Stars	Dipo Dina Stadium, Ijebu-Ode
15:00 (UTC+1)	Jabbar 44'; Christian 72'		Kumaga 57'

28 May 2023	Enugu Rangers	1–0	Doma United	Akure Township Stadium, Akure
16:00 (UTC+1)	90+2'

28 May 2023	Plateau United	1–0	Kwara United	FIFA Goal Project Stadium, Abuja
16:00 (UTC+1)	Yakubu 44'

== Semi-final ==
In the semi-final, Enugu Rangers defeated Plateau United courtesy of a last minute penalty kick while Bendel Insurance won on penalty shootout to extend their unbeaten record this season to 23 games. The matches were played on 1 June.

Team 1	Score	Team 2
Plateau United	0–1	Enugu Rangers
Bendel Insurance	0–0 (4–2 p)	Warri Wolves

1 June 2023	Plateau United	0–1	Enugu Rangers	Dipo Dina Stadium, Ijebu-Ode
16:00 (UTC+1)			Obaje 90+2' (pen.)

1 June 2023	Bendel Insurance	0–0 (4–2 p)	Warri Wolves	Mobolaji Johnson Arena, Lagos
16:00 (UTC+1)

== Final ==
Bendel Insurance defeated Enugu Rangers to earn their fourth title, their first since 1980 and earned the right to participate in the 2023–24 CAF Confederation Cup.

Team 1	Score	Team 2
Bendel Insurance	1–0	Enugu Rangers

21 June	Bendel Insurance	1–0	Enugu Rangers	Stephen Keshi Stadium, Asaba
17:00	Osarenkhoe 45+8' (pen.)	Report
