= Sunusi Ibrahim =

Nigerian footballer (born 2002)

Personal information
- Full name: Sunusi Ibrahim
- Date of birth: 1 October 2002 (age 24)
- Place of birth: Keffi, Nigeria
- Height: 5 ft 6 in (1.68 m)
- Position: Forward

Youth career
- FC Basira

Senior career*
Years	Team	Apps	(Gls)
2019	Nasarawa United	22	(10)
2020–2021	36 Lion	0	(0)
2021–2026	CF Montréal	92	(13)
2022	→ CF Montreal U23 (loan)	2	(0)

International career^{‡}
2019–	Nigeria U23	3	(0)
2019–	Nigeria	3	(1)
- * Club domestic league appearances and goals as of 21:03, 2 July 2026 (UTC) ‡ National team caps and goals as of 09:46, 25 August 2021 (UTC)

Sunusi Ibrahim (born 1 October 2002) is a Nigerian professional footballer who plays as a forward.

== Club career ==
Born in Keffi, Ibrahim was part of the youth system at FC Basira in Lafia before joining Nigerian Professional Football League side Nasarawa United. During the 2019 season, Ibrahim finished the season as the league's joint-top scorer, scoring 10 goals in 22 matches. He was also awarded the Golden Boot over joint-top scorer Mfon Udoh since Ibrahim was given one less caution during the season.

After the 2019 season, Ibrahim left Nasarawa United following the Federation Cup, and then in 2020, Ibrahim was part of 36 Lion Football Club in Lagos.

On 12 January 2021, Ibrahim signed for Canadian Major League Soccer club CF Montréal. After over 5 years with the club, Ibrahim and Montréal mutually agreed to part ways.

== International career ==
Following his performances during 2019 season, Ibrahim was called up to the Nigeria squad for the 2020 African Nations Championship qualifiers. He made his debut for his nation on 22 September 2019 against Togo, scoring the only goal for Nigeria in a 1–4 defeat.

In November 2019, Ibrahim was called up to the Nigeria under-23 side. He made his debut for them on 9 November 2019 during the 2019 African U-23 Cup of Nations qualifiers against the Ivory Coast.

== Career statistics ==
=== Club ===
As of 18 November 2021.

Club	Season	League			National cup		Continental		Other		Total	
Club	Season	Division	Apps	Goals	Apps	Goals	Apps	Goals	Apps	Goals	Apps	Goals
Nasarawa United	2019	NPFL	22	10	0	0	–		–		22	10
CF Montréal	2021	MLS	26	4	1	0	–		–		27	4
Career total			48	14	1	0	–		–		49	14

=== International ===
As of match played 10 April 2020.

National team	Year	Apps	Goals
Nigeria	2019	2	1
Total		2	1

Scores and results list Nigeria's goal tally first.

No.	Date	Venue	Opponent	Score	Result	Competition
1.	22 September 2019	Stade de Kégué, Lomé, Togo	Togo	1–0	1–4	2020 African Nations Championship qualification
