= Okey Emordi =

Nigerian ex-football player

Felix Okechukwu Emordi is a Nigerian former football player who played for Enugu Rangers International. After he retires from active football, he went into coaching and went on to guide Enyimba International F.C. to win the 2004 CAF Champions League.

== Accolades ==
=== International ===
- CAF Champions League – 2004

=== Individual ===
- 2005 African Coach of the Year
- 2nd Nigeria Pitch Awards – Coach of the Year
