= Chijioke Mbaoma =

Nigerian footballer (born 2003)

Personal information
- Full name: Chijioke Miracle Mbaoma
- Date of birth: 6 May 2003 (age 23)
- Place of birth: Eziama Nkwere, Imo State, Nigeria
- Height: 1.83 m (6 ft 0 in)
- Position: Forward

Team information
- Current team: Rivers United F.C.
- Number: 15

Senior career*
Years	Team	Apps	(Gls)
2020–2022	Heartland F.C.		
2022–	Enyimba F.C.	52	(23)
- * Club domestic league appearances and goals

Chijioke Miracle Mbaoma (born 6 May 2003) is a Nigerian professional footballer serving as a forward for Rivers United F.C. of Port Harcourt in southern Nigeria, a team that plays in the Nigerian Premier Football League (NPFL) and CAF Champions League.

Commencing his professional career in 2021 with Heartland FC of Owerri, Mbaoma joined Enyimba F.C. for the 2022–23 football season. At the beginning of the season, he helped Enyimba FC reach the finals of the Dozy Mmobuosi Pre-season Cup, where he emerged as the highest goal scorer of the competition. During the season, he made fourteen appearances and scored five goals, helping the club to the league title.

During the 2023–24 Nigerian Premier Football League (NPFL) season and the 2023–24 CAF Champions League qualifying rounds, Mbaoma continues to play for Enyimba FC.
