= Enyimba F.C. =

Association football club in Nigeria

Enyimba FC
- Full name: Enyimba Football Club
- Nicknames: Peoples' Elephant, The Aba Warriors
- Founded: 1976; 50 years ago
- Ground: Enyimba International Stadium; Aba, Abia, Nigeria
- Capacity: 16,000
- Owner: Abia State Government
- Chairman: Nwankwo Kanu
- Coach: Deutsch Detchoua Gustave Emmanuel
- League: Nigeria Premier Football League
- 2025–26: 11th of 20
- Website: www.enyimbafc.net
| Home colours | Away colours |

Enyimba Football Club, commonly known as Enyimba, is a Nigerian professional football club based in the city of Aba, Abia State which plays in the Nigerian Professional Football League. Their name means People's Elephant in Igbo language and is also the nickname used for the city of Aba. Founded in 1976, the club rose to prominence in the 2000s and is considered the most successful Nigerian football club as they have won two consecutive African Champions League titles, nine Nigerian championships and four Federation Cups since 2001. Their most recent league glory came in the 2022–23 season.

== History ==
=== Early years ===
The club was founded as a state-owned club in November 1976 by Jerry Amadi Enyeazu, who was the first Director for Sports in the newly established Imo State, a province in southeast Nigeria. In August 1991, Imo State was divided further and Abia State was created from the part of Imo which included the city of Aba, Enyimba's hometown, so the new state government took over as owners of Enyimba.

In the 1970s and 1980s, Enyimba struggled to make a notable impact as the traditional powerhouses such as Enugu Rangers, Shooting Stars, Bendel Insurance and local rivals Iwuanyanwu Nationale dominated Nigerian football. Enyimba's rise to fame began in 1990 when the Professional League was inaugurated.

In their first season in the top division, Enyimba finished 13th out of 16 clubs, winning just five out of 30 games with a goal difference 25–36. In the following season, they won eight games but still finished 15th with 36 points, just one point short from escaping relegation behind Stationery Stores, and were relegated to second level for the 1992 season. Enyimba stayed in the second level for the next two seasons before winning promotion in 1993, finishing first with 29 wins out of 46 games, winning a record 96 points with a goal difference of 64–25, with most goals scored and fewest goals conceded in the 24-team league.

Back at the top level, their string of good results continued, and they finished the 1994 season third, behind BCC Lions and Shooting Stars, missing out on a spot in the 1995 CAF Cup on goal difference. After a mediocre 1995 season, they won fourth place in 1996, before a series of inconsistent results saw them narrowly escaping relegation on goal difference in 1997 and finishing seventh in the 1999 season.

=== Rise to prominence ===
The People's Elephant experienced international football for the first time in August 2001, when they were invited to play Inter Milan at San Siro in a charity friendly which marked the return of Ronaldo after a 21-month injury layoff and saw Enyimba thrashed 7–0 with four goals from Christian Vieri.

The club went on to win their second successive league title in 2002, and then became the first Nigerian club to win the continent's premier international club competition in the 2003 CAF Champions League by beating Ismaily of Egypt 2–1 on aggregate, under coach Kadiri Ikhana. This was also the first time since 1996 that a Nigerian club had reached the final of the competition. Several key players from Enyimba's 2003 continental success have since gone on to play for Nigeria (Vincent Enyeama, Obinna Nwaneri and Onyekachi Okonkwo) and Benin Republic National Team (Muri Ogunbiyi).

Enyimba then successfully defended their title as they won their second consecutive African Champions League title in 2004, beating Tunisia's Étoile du Sahel in the finals. After finishing runners-up in the national championship in 2004 (behind Dolphins), Enyimba won the Double in 2005, winning their fourth Nigerian championship and their first Nigerian Cup.

=== 2003–2008: awards ===
In 2003, Enyimba won the best team in Africa award while coach Kadiri emerged the best coach. In 2004, the club retained the best coach award while the club's first choice goalkeeper, Vincent Enyeama won the Champions league player of the year.

These two Champions league victories in the hands of West African teams, plus the second CAF Super Cup against Accra Hearts of Oak finally brought Enyimba to the limelight of African football. The team signed a $300,000 uniform deal with Joma in 2008.

=== 2016 season ===
The 2016 season was not so favorable for People's Elephants as end the season being ninth on the league with 50 points.

=== 2017 season ===
Enyimba finished third in the league with 61 points. The third position saw Enyimba qualify to represent Nigeria at the CAF Confederations Cup the following season.

=== Record-breaking Eighth Title ===
On 12 June, 2019, Enyimba won a record 8th Nigeria Premier Football League title, to move one clear of Rangers International F.C. on the all-time rankings. The title was clinched after a 3-0 victory over Akwa United, with goals from Reuben Bala, Stanley Dimgba and Abdulrahman Bashir, during the Super Six Championship Playoffs in which they garnered 12 points from 5 matches.

=== Ninth Title ===
The 2022–23 Nigeria Professional Football League season had an abridged format in which teams were split into two groups of 10, with the top 3 teams from each group qualifying for the Super Six Championship Playoffs. On 21 May, 2023, the final day of the regular season, the team coached by former Nigeria national football team winger, Finidi George, secured a Super Six Championship Playoff spot with a draw against Shooting Stars SC in Ibadan.

On 3 June, 2023, they faced Remo Stars in the first game of the playoffs, at Onikan Stadium. In the second half, they went ahead through Adiele Eriugo but were pegged back soon after by Junior Lokosa. They were soon awarded a penalty after a foul on Chijioke Mbaoma by Segun Olalere. Chukwuemeka Obioma converted the penalty to give them the lead again. In stoppage time, Remo's captain Nduka Junior scored a free kick. The game ended 2-2.

On 5 June, 2023, Enyimba faced Lobi Stars in the second round of playoff games. The only goal of the game early in the first half through Chukwuemeka Obioma. The 1-0 victory sent them to the top of the standings.

On 7 June, 2023, they faced Bendel Insurance, who were on a 20-game unbeaten run, in the third round of playoff games. In the 23rd minute, The People’s Elephant went ahead through Sadiq Abubakar. In the 37th minute, Divine Nwachukwu equalised for Bendel Insurance. There was no goal in the second half and the game ended 1-1.

On 9 June 2023, Enyimba faced Sunshine Stars in the fourth round of playoff games without league top scorer, Chukwuemeka Obioma, who had picked up an injury in the previous game. They went ahead in the 3rd minute through Chijioke Mbaoma. In the 8th minute, he doubled their lead. Midfielder, Ikenna Cooper, sealed a 3-0 win with a free kick in the 66th minute. They remained top of the standings ahead of their final day opponents, Rivers United, on goal difference.

On 11 June 2023, Enyimba faced Rivers United in the NPFL title decider with both teams locked on 8 points and separated by goal difference. Earlier in the day, Remo Stars had beaten Bendel Insurance 1-0 to go top of the table on 9 points. This result meant that Enyimba only needed a draw to win the title, as they had a superior goal difference to the other two contenders.

Enyimba took the lead in the 39th minute through Ekene Awazie and went into halftime 1-0 up. Three minutes after the restart, Rivers United equalised through Nwangwa Nyima but The People's Elephant held on till the end to clinch their record-extending ninth Nigeria Premier Football League title.

== Home ground ==
Enyimba currently uses the Enyimba International Stadium located in the city of Aba in Abia State. The stadium was renovated in 2018.

== Honours ==
=== Domestic ===
- Nigerian Premier League
  - Winners (9): 2001, 2002, 2003, 2005, 2007, 2009–10, 2015, 2019, 2023
- Nigerian FA Cup
  - Winners (4): 2005, 2009, 2013, 2014
- National Second Division
  - Winners (1): 1993
- Nigerian Super Cup
  - Winners (4): 2001, 2003, 2010, 2013

=== Continental ===
- CAF Champions League
  - Winners (2): 2003, 2004
- CAF Super Cup
  - Winners (2): 2004, 2005

== Current squad ==
As of 12 February 2023

Note: Flags indicate national team as defined under FIFA eligibility rules; some limited exceptions apply. Players may hold more than one non-FIFA nationality.

| No. | Pos. | Nation | Player |
|---|---|---|---|
| 1 | GK | NGA | Nathaniel Asibe |
| 2 | DF | NGA | Odinaka Obichere |
| 5 | DF | NGA | Gabriel Innocent |
| 6 | FW | NGA | Ekwutoziam Eze |
| 7 | MF | NGA | Nzondiegwu Nonso |
| 8 | FW | NGA | Chukwudi Nwaodu |
| 9 | FW | NGA | Chukwuemeka Obioma |
| 10 | MF | NGA | Akanni Elijah |
| 13 | FW | NGA | Alade Balogun |
| 14 | FW | NGA | Jeremy Olatunji |
| 15 | MF | NGA | Nweke Kalu |
| 16 | DF | NGA | Francis Odinaka |
| 18 | DF | NGA | Pascal Eze |

| No. | Pos. | Nation | Player |
|---|---|---|---|
| 19 | FW | NGA | Ismail Sarki |
| 20 | DF | NGA | Asuquo Uwana |
| 21 | GK | NGA | Emeka Onyekachi |
| 22 | MF | NGA | Chinedu Ufere |
| 23 | FW | NGA | Austin Onyemaechi |
| 24 | MF | NGA | Fatai Abdullahi |
| 25 | DF | NGA | Somiari Alalibo |
| 26 | DF | NGA | Odita Okechukwu |
| 29 | DF | NGA | Imo Obot |
| 30 | FW | NGA | Ekene Awazie |
| 31 | FW | NGA | Ifeanyi Ihemekwele |
| 35 | GK | NGA | Henry Ani |
| 38 | FW | NGA | Adiele Eriugo |

== Performance in CAF competitions ==
- CAF Champions League: 8 appearances

2002 – second round
2003 – champion (Enyimba International F.C. season 2003)
2004 – champion
2005 – group stage (Top 8)
2006 – group stage (Top 8)
2008 – semi-finals
2011 – semi-finals
2014 – first round
2015 – first round
2016 – group stage (Top 8)
2020 – first round

- CAF Confederation Cup: 3 appearances

2010 – second round of 16
2018 – semi-finals
2020 – quarter-finals
2021 – quarter-finals

== Coaching history ==
- (Serbia) Kosta Papić (1998–02)
- (Nigeria) Shaibu Amodu (2002–03)
- (Nigeria) Kadiri Ikhana (2003–04)
- (Australia) Michael Urukalo (2004)
- (Nigeria) Okey Emordi (2004–05)
- (Nigeria) Alphonsus Dike (2005–06)
- (Belgium) Maurice Cooreman (Oct 2006 – 9 Feb)
- (Nigeria) Daniel Amokachi (2008)
- (Nigeria) Augustine Eguavoen (2008–09)
- (Nigeria) Okey Emordi (Aug 2009 – Nov 2011)
- (Nigeria) Abdu Maikaba (Nov 2011– Jan 2016)
- (Nigeria) Paul Aigbogun (Jan 2016 – Jul 2018)
- (Iran) Ali Hanteh (Jul 2018 – Jan 2020)
- (Nigeria) Fatai Osho (Jan 2020 – 2021)
- (Nigeria) Finidi George (Sept 2021 – May 2024)
- (Nigeria) Yemi Daniel Olanrewaju (May 2024 – Dec 2024)
- (Nigeria) Stanley Azunda Eguma (Jan 2025 – Nov 2025)
- (Nigeria) Deji Ayeni (Nov 2025 – Jan 2026)
- (Cameroon) Emmanuel Deutsch (Jan 2026– present)

== Notable players ==
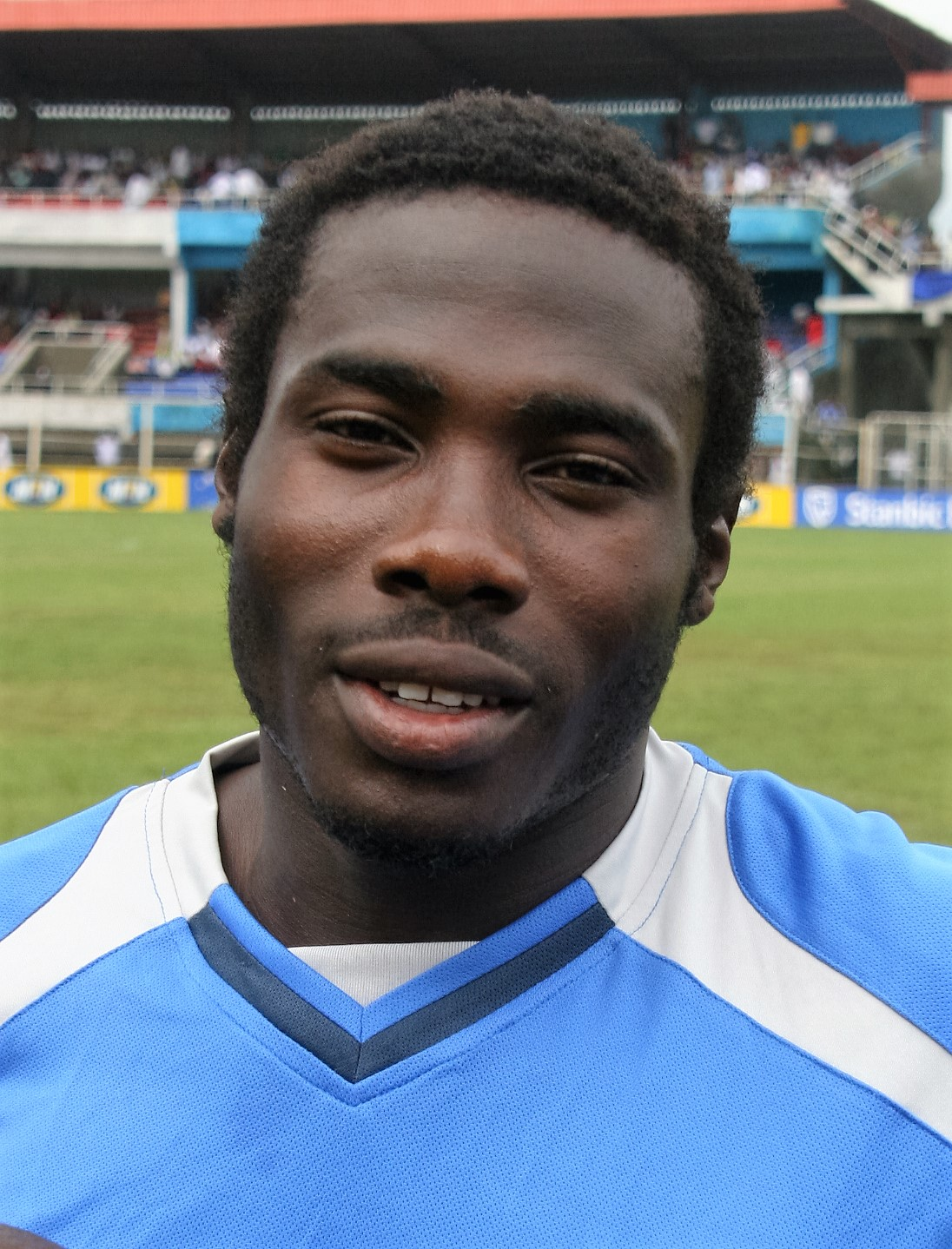
Stephen Worgu in a shirt of Enyimba FC at the Enyimba International Stadium

- Kalu Uche
- Ibrahim Mustapha
- Vincent Enyeama
- Obinna Nwaneri
- Mouritala Ogunbiyi
- Uche Kalu
- Onyekachi Okonkwo
- Joetex Frimpong
- Ikechukwu Ezenwa
- Chinedu Udoji
- Valentine Ozornwafor
- Stephen Worgu
- Romanus Orjinta
- Dele Aiyenugba
- Ikouwem Udo
- Anayo Iwuala
