= 2022–23 Nigeria Professional Football League =

Nigeria Premier League season

Nigeria Professional Football League
- Season: 2022–23
- Dates: 8 January – 11 June
- Champions: Enyimba (9th title)
- Promoted: Bendel Insurance; Doma United; Bayelsa United; El-Kanemi Warriors
- Relegated: Wikki Tourists; Nasarawa United; El-Kanemi Warriors; Dakkada
- CAF Champions League: Enyimba; Remo Stars
- CAF Confederation Cup: Rivers United; Bendel Insurance
- Matches: 195
- Goals: 411 (2.11 per match)
- Top goalscorer: Chukwuemeka Obioma (16 goals)
- Best goalkeeper: Bankole Kayode (11 clean sheets)
- Biggest home win: Plateau United 5–0 El-Kanemi Warriors (15 February 2023); Enyimba 5–0 Gombe United (7 May 2023)
- Biggest away win: Nasarawa United 0–3 Akwa United (22 January 2023)
- Highest scoring: Plateau United 3–3 Shooting Stars (15 January 2023); Dakkada 2–4 Abia Warriors (4 February 2023); Bayelsa United 5–1 Abia Warriors (2 April 2023)
- Longest winning run: (5 matches); Bendel Insurance
- Longest unbeaten run: (21 matches); Bendel Insurance
- Longest winless run: (7 matches); El-Kanemi Warriors
- Longest losing run: (5 matches); Dakkada
- All statistics correct as of 11 June 2023.

The 2022–23 Nigeria Professional Football League was the 52nd season of Nigeria's top-flight association football league and the 33rd since attaining professionalism. The regular season started on 8 January 2023 and concluded with the playoffs on 11 June 2023.

Bendel Insurance, Doma United, Bayelsa United and El-Kanemi Warriors were the four promoted clubs from the 2021–22 Nigeria National League, replacing Kano Pillars, Katsina United, MFM and Heartland.

Following Enyimba draw against Rivers United on 11 June at the playoffs, Enyimba secured a record ninth NPFL title at the Onikan Stadium.

== Format ==
The clubs and league organizers decided to start the 2022–23 season on 8 January 2023 instead of 28 December 2022 as previously planned. The league will switch to an abridged format that will see the clubs split into two groups of ten each. The top three clubs from each group will qualify for a championship round, which will be known as the Super Six, to determine the league winners.

== Teams ==
=== Changes from previous season ===
The following teams changed divisions since the end of the 2021–22 season

Promoted from the 2021–22 Nigeria National League

- Bayelsa United
- Bendel Insurance
- Doma United
- El-Kanemi Warriors

Relegated from the 2021–22 Nigeria Professional Football League

- Heartland
- Kano Pillars
- Katsina United
- MFM

== Regular season ==
=== Group A ===
==== League table ====
Pos	Team	Pld	W	D	L	GF	GA	GD	Pts	
1	Bendel Insurance	18	8	10	0	22	11	+11	34	Qualification to Championship round
2	Remo Stars	18	9	6	3	21	14	+7	33	Qualification to Championship round
3	Enyimba	18	9	5	4	25	12	+13	32	Qualification to Championship round
4	Akwa United	18	9	5	4	24	14	+10	32	
5	Plateau United	18	7	5	6	29	23	+6	26	
6	Shooting Stars	18	5	8	5	20	20	0	23	
7	Gombe United	18	4	7	7	10	20	−10	19	
8	Kwara United	18	4	5	9	11	22	−11	17	
9	Nasarawa United	18	3	5	10	15	23	−8	14	Relegation to the National League
10	El-Kanemi Warriors	18	2	4	12	10	28	−18	10	Relegation to the National League

Updated to match(es) played on 21 May 2023. Source: NPFL
Rules for classification: 1) points; 2) goal difference; 3) number of goals scored

==== Positions by round ====
To preserve chronological evolvements, any postponed matches are not included to the round at which they were originally scheduled, but added to the full round they were played immediately afterwards. For example, if a match is scheduled for round 7, but then played between rounds 8 and 9, it will be added to the standings for round 8.

Team ╲ Round	1	2	3	4	5	6	7	8	9	10	11	12	13	14	15	16	17	18
Akwa United	9	9	3	4	4	4	4	4	3	2	3	2	2	3	2	4	4	4
Bendel Insurance	1	1	2	1	1	1	1	1	1	1	1	1	1	1	1	1	1	1
El-Kanemi Warriors	10	4	6	7	9	9	8	9	10	10	10	10	10	10	10	10	10	10
Enyimba	3	3	5	3	3	3	2	2	2	4	4	5	4	2	3	2	2	3
Gombe United	6	8	7	8	6	7	7	7	6	7	6	7	6	6	7	7	7	7
Kwara United	7	6	8	9	8	8	9	8	8	6	8	8	8	8	8	8	8	8
Nasarawa United	8	10	10	10	10	10	10	10	9	9	9	9	9	9	9	9	9	9
Plateau United	4	7	4	6	5	5	5	3	4	3	5	4	5	5	4	5	5	5
Remo Stars	2	2	1	2	2	2	3	5	5	5	2	3	3	4	5	3	3	2
Shooting Stars	5	5	9	5	7	6	6	6	7	8	7	6	7	7	6	6	6	6

Leader
Qualification to Championship round
Relegation to Nigeria National League

Updated to match(es) played on 21 May 2023. Source: World Football

==== Results ====
Home \ Away	AKW	BEN	EKW	ENY	GOM	KWA	NAS	PLA	REM	3SC
Akwa United		0–2	2–0	1–0	1–0	3–1	2–2	1–0	3–1	2–0
Bendel Insurance	1–1		2–1	1–0	0–0	1–1	1–0	2–1	3–0	1–1
El-Kanemi Warriors	1–1	0–1		0–1	0–0	1–2	2–1	2–2	1–2	0–0
Enyimba	0–0	1–1	2–0		5–0	3–0	1–1	2–1	1–1	2–0
Gombe United	0–1	0–0	1–0	1–2		1–0	1–1	3–2	0–1	2–1
Kwara United	2–1	0–1	2–0	1–2	0–0		1–0	1–1	0–0	0–1
Nasarawa United	0–3	1–1	1–2	1–2	1–1	2–0		1–2	2–0	1–0
Plateau United	1–0	1–1	5–0	2–1	2–0	1–0	1–0		1–2	3–3
Remo Stars	1–0	1–1	2–0	1–0	0–0	4–0	1–0	1–1		2–0
Shooting Stars	2–2	2–2	1–0	0–0	1–0	0–0	2–0	3–2	1–1	

Updated to match(es) played on 21 May 2023. Source: Soccerway
Legend: Blue = home team win; Yellow = draw; Red = away team win.

=== Group B ===
==== League table ====
Pos	Team	Pld	W	D	L	GF	GA	GD	Pts	
1	Rivers United	18	9	7	2	24	15	+9	34	Qualification to Championship round
2	Lobi Stars	18	9	3	6	20	17	+3	30	Qualification to Championship round
3	Sunshine Stars	18	7	6	5	20	14	+6	27	Qualification to Championship round
4	Abia Warriors	18	8	3	7	22	24	−2	27	
5	Doma United	18	7	5	6	15	15	0	26	
6	Niger Tornadoes	18	6	5	7	16	16	0	23	
7	Bayelsa United (Note: Bayelsa United had three points and three goals deducted by the IMC.)	18	6	6	6	24	24	0	21	
8	Enugu Rangers	18	4	9	5	16	16	0	21	
9	Wikki Tourists	18	5	4	9	18	23	−5	19	Relegation to the National League
10	Dakkada	18	3	4	11	15	29	−14	13	Relegation to the National League

Updated to match(es) played on 21 May 2023. Source: NPFL
Rules for classification: 1) points; 2) goal difference; 3) number of goals scored

==== Positions by round ====
To preserve chronological evolvements, any postponed matches are not included to the round at which they were originally scheduled, but added to the full round they were played immediately afterwards. For example, if a match is scheduled for round 7, but then played between rounds 8 and 9, it will be added to the standings for round 8.

Team ╲ Round	1	2	3	4	5	6	7	8	9	10	11	12	13	14	15	16	17	18
Abia Warriors	1	1	2	4	3	3	2	2	4	4	3	5	6	4	6	2	5	4
Bayelsa United	4	8	7	8	8	8	8	10	9	9	8	8	7	6	7	6	7	6
Dakkada	5	3	5	7	9	9	10	9	10	10	10	10	10	10	9	9	10	10
Doma United	6	7	6	6	6	4	5	5	6	5	6	3	4	3	2	3	3	5
Enugu Rangers	9	10	9	9	7	7	7	7	7	7	7	7	8	8	8	8	8	8
Lobi Stars	8	5	4	2	2	1	1	1	1	2	1	1	1	1	1	1	1	2
Niger Tornadoes	2	2	3	3	4	6	6	6	5	6	4	4	3	5	4	5	6	7
Rivers United	3	4	1	1	1	2	3	3	3	1	2	2	2	2	3	4	2	1
Sunshine Stars	7	6	8	5	5	5	4	4	2	3	5	6	5	7	5	7	4	3
Wikki Tourists	10	9	10	10	10	10	9	8	8	8	9	9	9	9	10	10	9	9

Leader
Qualification to Championship round
Relegation to Nigeria National League

Updated to match(es) played on 21 May 2023. Source: World Football

==== Results ====
Home \ Away	ABI	BAY	DAK	DOM	ENU	LOB	NIG	RIV	SUN	WIK
Abia Warriors		3–1	3–0	2–0	2–1	0–1	1–0	0–0	2–1	1–1
Bayelsa United	5–1		1–1	1–1	1–1	3–0	2–0	2–2	2–1	2–1
Dakkada	2–4	1–1		1–0	1–1	1–1	1–2	1–2	2–1	2–1
Doma United	1–0	2–1	1–0		0–0	2–0	2–1	2–1	1–1	2–0
Enugu Rangers	0–2	2–1	1–0	1–0		1–1	2–2	1–1	1–1	3–0
Lobi Stars	2–0	3–0	2–1	2–0	1–0		1–0	3–2	1–0	0–2
Niger Tornadoes	3–0	1–1	1–0	1–0	0–0	0–0		0–0	0–2	2–0
Rivers United	1–1	2–1	1–0	2–0	1–0	2–1	2–1		1–0	2–0
Sunshine Stars	1–0	1–0	3–0	1–1	1–1	1–0	2–0	1–1		1–0
Wikki Tourists	4–0	1–2	3–1	0–0	1–0	2–1	0–2	1–1	1–1	

Updated to match(es) played on 21 May 2023. Source: Soccerway
Legend: Blue = home team win; Yellow = draw; Red = away team win.

== Championship round ==
The Championship round, also known as the super six playoffs, was held between 3–11 June at the Mobolaji Johnson Arena, Lagos.

Pos	Team	Pld	W	D	L	GF	GA	GD	Pts		ENY	REM	RIV	SUN	BEN	LOB
1	Enyimba	5	2	3	0	8	4	+4	9	Champions League	—	—	1–1	3–0	—	1–0
2	Remo Stars	5	2	3	0	8	5	+3	9	Champions League	2–2	—	—	—	1–0	2–0
3	Rivers United	5	2	3	0	6	4	+2	9	CAF CC	—	2–2	—	1–0	2–1	—
4	Sunshine Stars	5	1	2	2	5	7	−2	5		—	1–1	—	—	1–1	3–1
5	Bendel Insurance	5	0	3	2	3	5	−2	3	CAF CC (Note: Bendel Insurance qualified as Federation Cup winners.)	1–1	—	—	—	—	0–0
6	Lobi Stars	5	0	2	3	1	6	−5	2		—	—	0–0	—	—	—

Source: Soccerway
Rules for classification: 1) Points; 2) Head-to-head points 3) Goal difference; 4) Goals scored; 5) Disciplinary points; 6) Play-off (Only to decide champions, runners-up, third placed and relegation spots); 7) Drawing of lots

== Top scorers ==
As of 11 June 2023

Rank	Player	Club	Goals
1	(Nigeria) Chukwuemeka Obioma	Enyimba	16
2	(Nigeria) Robert Mizo	Bayelsa United	8
2	(Nigeria) Imade Osehenkhoe	Bendel Insurance	8
4	(Nigeria) Nyima Nwagua	Rivers United	7
5	(Nigeria) Umar Abba	Lobi Stars	6
5	(Nigeria) Bello Lukman	Abia Warriors	6
5	(Nigeria) David Okoromi	Niger Tornadoes	6
5	(Nigeria) Cyril Olisema	Akwa United	6
5	(Nigeria) Ismael Seriki	Bendel Insurance	6
5	(Nigeria) Musa Usman	Doma United	6
