= Plateau United F.C. =

Nigerian football club

Plateau United FC
- Full name: Plateau United Football Club of Jos
- Nickname: The peace boys.
- Founded: 1975; 51 years ago
- Ground: New Jos Stadium; Jos, Nigeria
- Capacity: 44,000
- Owner: Plateau State
- Chairman: Dr. Alhassan Yakmut
- Manager: Gbenga Ogunbote
- League: Nigeria Professional Football League
- 2025–26: 10th of 20
- Website: https://www.plateauunitedfc.com/list/player-list/
Home colours	Away colours

Plateau United Football Club of Jos (usually known as Plateau United) is a Nigerian professional football (soccer) club based in Jos, that competes in the Nigerian Professional Football League. Before 1991, they were known as the JIB Strikers FC. The name "Plateau United" was the former name of their cross-town rivals Mighty Jets.

== History ==
Plateau United were founded in 1975 as JIB Strikers FC.

Plateau United won their first major silverware in 1999, a 1–0 Nigeria Cup final victory over Iwuanyanwu Nationale on a goal by Donatus Iloka. They had lost in the final in 1993 and 1998. They made their continental debut in 2000, but were eliminated after their first tie.

They were promoted to the Nigeria Premier League for the 2010–11 season by winning on the last day against Mighty Jets, but were relegated the next year on the last day. They were promoted to the top league on the last day of the 2015 season.

In 2013, their feeder team were one of four clubs suspended, pending an investigation into their 79–0 victory over Akurba FC. The four clubs were accused of match-fixing to advance into the professional league. On 22 July 2013, Plateau Feeders, Akurba FC, Police Machine FC and Bubayaro FC were each banned for 10 years, with the players and officials in each game banned for life.

Plateau United won the Nigerian Professional Football League for the first time in 2017, led by coach Kennedy Boboye.

Plateau United drew an average home attendance of 1,982 in the 2023–24 Nigeria Premier Football League.

== Ownership and Management ==
Since its inception, the State Government owns the club, ensuring stability and community connection. Home Matches are played at the impressive New Jos Stadium with a capacity of up to 60,000 supporters.

== Youth Development and Women Team ==
The club emphasizes youth and women’s football development, with collaborations including scouting events in Abuja backed by the Exports Promotion Council, ensuring a pipeline of future talent. Graduates like John Obi Mikel, Celestine Babayaro, and Emmanuel Babayaro have represented Nigeria Internationally.

== Cultural Impact ==
Plateau United stands as a symbol of Northern Nigerian football, breaking the dominance of Southern clubs through homegrown talent.

== Honors ==
Domestic

- Nigerian Professional Football League: 1

2017

- Nigerian FA Cup: 1

1999
Runners-up: 1993, 1998

Preseason/Friendly

- Unity Preseason Tournament: 1

2021

- Plateau state FA cup: 6

2019, 2020, 2021, 2022, 2023, 2024, 2025

== Kits and Sponsors ==
Period	Kit manufacturer	Shirt sponsor (chest)	Shirt sponsor (sleeve)
2015–2019	Cone	None	None
2019—2026	Kapspore	Bitnob	None
2026—till date	Galaxy		Experience Plateau

== Performance in CAF competitions ==
- CAF Cup Winners' Cup: 1 appearance

2000 – First Round

- CAF Champions League: 2018,

2020/21, 2022/23

- CAF Confederation Cup: 2018,

2022/23

== Management and Technical Crew ==
The management of the club is currently headed by Dr Alhassan Yakmut who acts in the capacity of Chairman while Gbenga Ogunbote serves as Technical Director

== Current team ==
As of 7 September 2026

Note: Flags indicate national team as defined under FIFA eligibility rules; some limited exceptions apply. Players may hold more than one non-FIFA nationality.

No.	Pos.	Nation	Player
3	DF	NGR	Raymond Aniako
4	MF	NGR	Vangsou Tchadienne
5	DF	NGR	Amietimi Enewarikpemi
6	MF	NGR	Obiuto Nwueke
7	FW	NGR	Paul Samson
8	FW	NGR	Nenrot Silas
9	FW	NGR	Saka Gafar
10	FW	NGR	Ekundayo Ojo
12	MF	NGR	Abdallah Hussaini
13	MF	NGR	Ikouwem Utin
14	MF	NGR	Magbisa Wisdom
15	DF	NGR	Mustapha Abdullahi
16	MF	NGR	Jonathan Okechukwu
17	FW	NGR	Seiyfa Jackson

No.	Pos.	Nation	Player
19	MF	NGR	Haggai Katoh
20	MF	NGR	Malik Lawal
22	GK	NGR	John Amah
23		NGR	Godspower Akekoromowei
25		NGR	Yahaya Ibrahim
27		NGR	Gideon Monday
26		NGR	Alex Agahowa
30		NGR	Akiemute Odah
31	DF	NGR	Mancha Sabbath
32		NGR	Victor Dawa
34	FW	NGR	Anas Yusuf
35	DF	NGR	Jimmy Ambrose
40		NGR	Isaiah Sunday

== Notable players ==
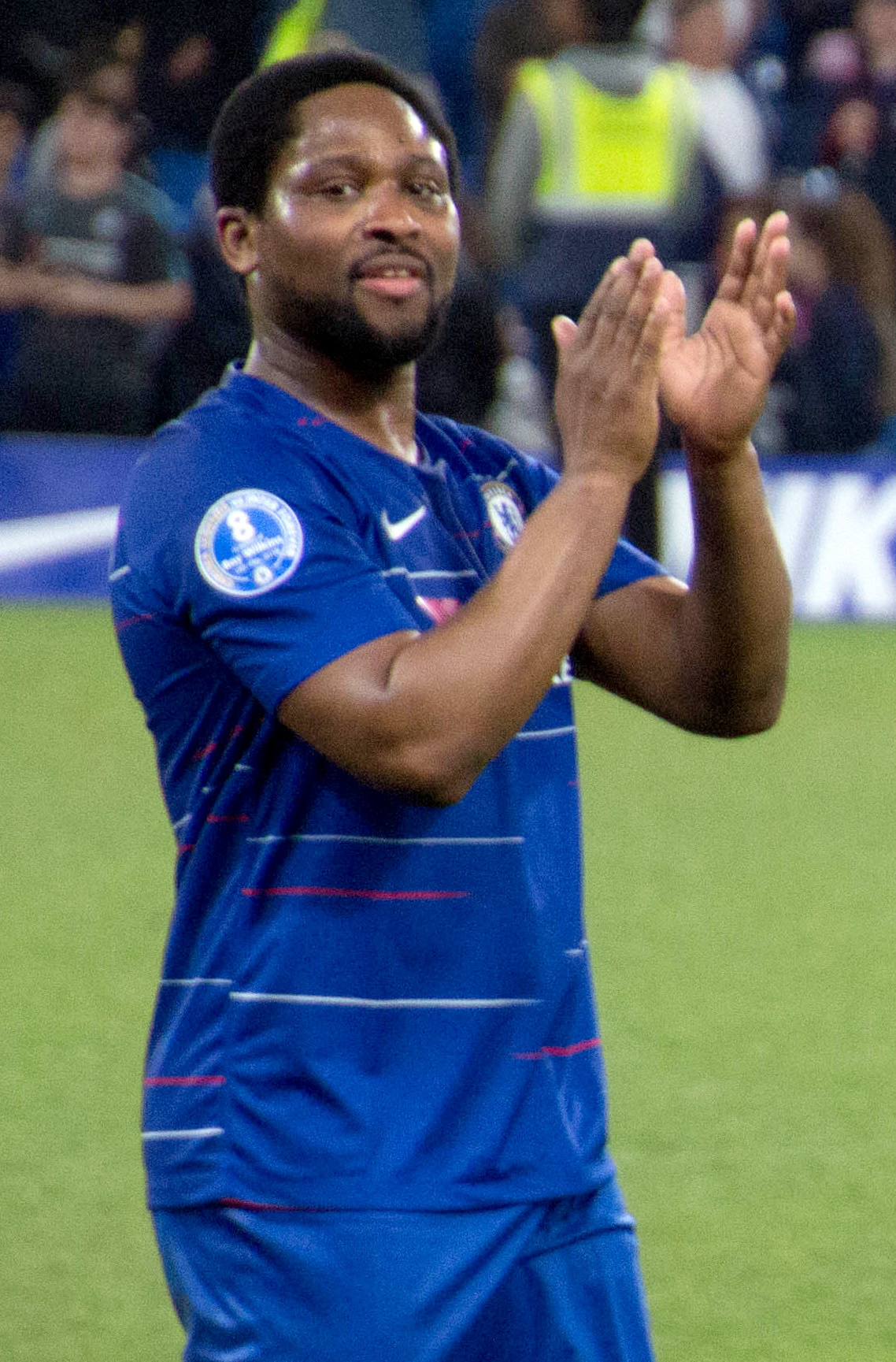
Celestine Babayaro played youth football for Plateau United

- (Nigeria) Chris Obodo
- (Nigeria) Celestine Babayaro
- (Nigeria) Mikel John Obi
- (Nigeria) Victor Obinna
- (Nigeria) Shehu Abdullahi
- (Nigeria) Sunday Ingbede
- (Nigeria) Daniel Itodo
- (Nigeria) Ibrahim Mustapha
- (Benin) Junior Salomon
- (Nigeria) Tosin Omoyele
- (Nigeria) Sikiru Olatunbosun
- (Nigeria) Philip Azango
- (Nigeria) Nansel Selbol
- (Nigeria) Sunday Adetunji
- (Nigeria) Oche Ochowechi
- (Nigeria) Chris Nweaze
- (Nigeria) Ibrahim Buhari
- (Nigeria) George Akpabio

== Management and Technical Crew ==
The management of the club is currently headed by Dr Alhassan Yakmut who acts in the capacity of Chairman while Gbenga Ogunbote serves as Technical Director
