= Remo Stars F.C. =

Football club in Nigeria

Remo Stars Football Club
- Full name: Remo Stars Football Club
- Nickname: Sky Blue Stars
- Founded: 2010; 16 years ago
- Ground: Remo Stars Stadium, Ikenne
- Capacity: 5,000
- Owner: Kunle Soname
- Chairman: Kunle Soname
- Head Coach: Daniel Ogunmodede
- League: Nigeria Premier Football League
- 2025–26: Nigeria Premier Football League, 17 of 20 (relegated)
- Website: remostarsfc.com
Home colours	Away colours

Remo Stars Football Club is a professional football club based in Ikenne, Ogun State, Nigeria. The club competes in the Nigeria Professional Football League, the top division of the Nigeria Football League system. They are nicknamed the Sky Blue Stars. In 2022, Remo Stars FC had a market value of €1.5 million.

== History ==
The club was founded in 2004 by Kunle Soname as FC Dender.

In 2010, continuous hard work of the club saw them promoted to the second tier of Nigerian Football, the Nigeria National League (NNL). Further development saw the club's management re-brand its organization. The rebranding included a change of name when FC Dender relocated to its current base of Remoland and changed its name to "Remo Stars Football Club". They played in the top division of Nigerian football, the Nigerian Premier League after promotion in 2016.

In 2018, Remo Stars were relegated from the Nigerian Professional Football League (NPFL) to Nigeria National League.

In September 2021, Remo Stars secured promotion to the Nigeria Professional Football League (NPFL) after finishing second in Nigeria National League (NNL) playoff Group A.

On 27th April, 2025, Remo Stars defeated Niger Tornadoes 1-0, through an 84th-minute goal by Olamilekan Adedayo, to secure their first ever Nigeria Premier Football League title. With this triumph, they became the first South-West club to win the title since 2000 when Julius Berger won it.

Remo Stars drew an average home attendance of 706 in the 2023–24 Nigeria Premier Football League.

Remo Stars won the Nigeria Premier Football League (NPFL) title in 2024/2025 to write a new chapter in their history.

However, in the following 2025/2026 season, Remo Stars suffered relegation from the NPFL following a 1-1 draw at Bendel Insurance on the final day of the season.

The Sky Blues’ relegation was confirmed after Kun Khalifat came from behind to claim a 3-1 win over Wikki Tourists. The Ikenne based club joins El Kanemi, Bayelsa United, and Wikki Tourists down to the NNL for next season.

The 2025/2026 exit from the top-flight league marked the club's third relegation in the club’s history after suffering relegations in 2017 and 2019

== Color ==
Remo Stars FC are also known as Sky Blue Stars. The primary color for Remo Stars is Sky Blue, While the away strips is yellow and the alternative color is white.

Remo Stars original home colours.

=== Kits and ===
Period	Kit manufacturer	Shirt sponsor (chest)	Shirt sponsor (sleeve)
2020–2021	Owu	ValueJet	None
202-25	Cone	Bet9ja	None
2025—	Dexie	Bet9ja	-

== Stadium ==
As a developing amateur team, Dender FC now Remo Stars FC played and trained at a local pitch in Ketu, in Lagos State.

The club then relocated to Remo Land in Ogun State and rebranded with a change of name to Remo Stars FC, as they played their home matches at Dipo Dina Stadium in Ijebu Ode until their promotion to the Nigeria Professional Football League for the 2017–2018 season.

Remo Stars then moved to Gateway International Stadium in Sagamu for their first season Nigeria professional football league season.

Remo Stars Fc currently play their home matches in Nigeria professional football league at the newly constructed Remo Stars FC Stadium, Ikenne.

== Rivalries ==
Gateway United F.C. are considered to be Remo Stars's main rivals, while Ijebu United are considered to be primary rivals. Remo Stars additionally share a rivalry with Shooting Stars S.C., in what is commonly known as the South West Derby, named after the South West (Nigeria)

Other Remo Stars Rivals are Sunshine Stars F.C. and MFM F.C.

In 2023, a rivalry developed between Remo Stars and Sporting Lagos FC. The matches between these two teams are dubbed the Southwest Derby.

On February 8, 2025, Remo Stars hosted Kano Pillars at Remo Stadium and secured a 2–1 victory. Prior to the match, Remo Stars had scored 19 goals at their home ground while conceding only four. The match was reported by a soccer website "Can Kano Pillars end Remo Stars' home winning streak?

== Performance in CAF competitions ==
- 2023-24 CAF Champions League qualifying rounds – First Round
- 2022-23 CAF Confederation Cup qualifying rounds – First Round

== Current squad ==
As of 15 September, 2025

Note: Flags indicate national team as defined under FIFA eligibility rules; some limited exceptions apply. Players may hold more than one non-FIFA nationality.

No.	Pos.	Nation	Player
1	GK	NGA	Ibrahim Sabitu
2	DF	NGA	Ibrahim Abubakar
4	MF	NGA	Sodiq Oshidero
6	MF	MLI	Chaka Coulibaly
7	FW	NGA	Samson Olasupo
8	FW	NGA	Shuaibu Lalle Ibrahim
9	FW	NGA	Joseph Abah
10	MF	NGA	Olamilekan Adedayo
11	DF	NGA	Sodiq Ismail
13	DF	NGA	Mutiu Dauda
14	MF	NGA	Alex Oyowah
15	DF	NGA	Stanley Joseph (captain)
16	MF	NGA	Hadi Haruna
17	MF	NGA	Samuel Anakwe
18	MF	NGA	Qudus Akanni

No.	Pos.	Nation	Player
19	FW	NGA	Jabal Malik
20	MF	NGA	Thankgod Ikeagwu
21	MF	BEN	Jerome Bonou
22	DF	NGA	Chigozie Chilekwu
23	MF	NGA	Michael Okoro Ibe
25	FW	NGA	Victor Mbaoma
26	GK	NGA	Emmanuel Okechukwu
27	FW	USA	Mark Gibson
29	FW	MLI	Adama Goita
30	GK	BEN	Serge Obassa
33	DF	NGA	Segun Owoade
34	DF	NGA	Ahmed Akinyele
35	GK	CTA	Alladum Kolimba
36	MF	NGA	Odunsi Sunday
38	DF	NGA	Olalekan Adeleke

== Honours ==
=== League ===
- Nigeria Premier Football League:
  - Winners (1): 2024–25
