= Bendel Insurance F.C. =

Nigerian football club

Bendel Insurance
- Full name: Bendel Insurance Football Club
- Nicknames: Vipers, The Benin Arsenal
- Founded: 1972; 54 years ago
- Ground: Samuel Ogbemudia Stadium; Benin City, Nigeria
- Capacity: 12,000
- Chairman: Jarret Tenebe
- Manager: Greg Ikhenoba
- League: Nigeria Premier Football League
- 2025–26: 5th
Home colours	Away colours

Bendel Insurance Football Club is a football club based in Benin City, Nigeria. The club plays in the Nigeria Premier Football League. They were originally known as the Vipers of Benin. They play their home matches at Samuel Ogbemudia Stadium, which has a capacity of 12,000. They won the 2023 edition of the Federation Cup after defeating Enugu Rangers 1–0 at the Stephen Keshi Stadium in Asaba on 21 June 2023.

== History ==
Created by Dr. Samuel Osaigbovo Ogbemudia, Bendel Insurance was one of the founding members of the Nigerian Premier League in 1972.

The team had its first month of the 2007–08 season delayed because of a management dispute over who controlled the team. The crisis led to two different clubs claiming the name Insurance. They were relegated at the end of the 2007–08 season after finishing in last place, the first relegation from the top level in the team's history.

In August 2008, the ownership crisis was settled and the Edo State government took control. Thus the name officially reverted to Bendel Insurance Football Club.

However, the club's financial problems continued throughout the season. In February 2009, Insurance was banned from using their stadium temporarily because it was not up to league standards. In March, they were one of eight teams threatened with having their participation suspended due to a backlog of debts and fines. Finally, they were exiled to Ilorin, North Central Nigeria, for their final home game of the season after crowd trouble in a 1–1 tie against Shooting Stars FC that put an end to their promotion chances. The reason for Bendel Insurance's breakdown was because of the ownership situations.

Bendel Insurance were promoted to the top flight for the 2019 season after spending over ten years in lower divisions. They were relegated to the NNL after just one season. They won promotion back to the NPFL on the penultimate day of the 2022 season.

== Honours ==
=== Domestic ===
- Nigeria Premier League
  - Winners (2): 1973, 1979
- Nigeria National League: 1
  - Winners (1): 2022
- Nigerian FA Cup
  - Winners (4): 1972, 1978, 1980, 2023

=== Continental ===
- CAF Cup
  - Winners (1): 1994

=== Regional ===
- West African Club Championship (UFOA Cup)
  - Winners (3): 1993, 1994, 1995

== Performance in CAF competitions ==
- African Cup of Champions Clubs: 2 appearances

1974: Second Round
1980: Semi-Finals

- CAF Confederation Cup: 1 appearance

2005 – Second Round

- CAF Cup: 1 appearance

1994 – Champion

- CAF Cup Winners' Cup: 2 appearances

1979 – Semi-Finals
1982 – Second Round

== Management ==
- Head Coach: Greg Ikpenoba
- Technical Director: Augustine Iyamu
- Team Manager: Peter Obanor
- Scouting Director: Idemudia Esigbe

== Notable players ==
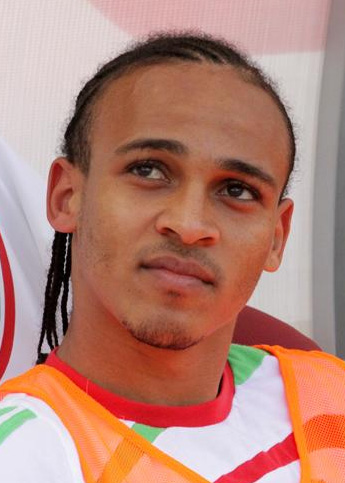
Peter Odemwingie scored 19 goals in 53 games for Bendel Insurance FC

- (Nigeria) Peter Odemwingie
- (Nigeria) Ambruse Vanzekin
- (Nigeria) Julius Aghahowa
- (Nigeria) Elderson Echiéjilé
- (Nigeria) Olubayo Adefemi
- (Nigeria) Bright Omokaro
