= 2012 Nigeria Premier League =

Nigeria Premier League
- Season: 2011–12
- Champions: Kano Pillars F.C.
- Relegated: Niger Tornadoes, Jigawa Golden Stars, Rising Stars F.C.
- Champions League: Kano Pillars F.C. Enugu Rangers
- Confederation Cup: Lobi Stars; Heartland F.C. (cup winner)
- Matches: 342
- Goals: 687 (2.01 per match)
- Top goalscorer: Sibi Gwar (Niger Tornadoes) - 13
- Biggest home win: Gombe United 5 Sharks F.C. 0 (1 Feb.); Rangers 5 Jigawa Golden Stars 0 (2 May)

The 2012 Nigeria Premier League is the 41st season of the competition since its inception, and the 22nd since the rebranding of the league as the "Professional League".

Sixteen teams from the previous season and four teams promoted from the Nigeria National League (Akwa United, Rising Stars, Jigawa Golden Stars and Wikki Tourists) are participating in this season.

The season was originally due to start November 26, 2011, less than a month after the conclusion of the previous season due to many long delays by the NFF. The date was pushed back to January 2012 to give time to organize and to sort out the league's sponsorship and scheduled to run to July.

== Clubs ==
Locations of the Nigeria Premier League 2011–12 teams

Team name	Home city	Home venue	First year of current stint in League
ABS	Ilorin	Kwara State Stadium	2010
Akwa United	Uyo	Uyo Township Stadium/UJ Esuene Stadium, Calabar	2011
Dolphins	Port Harcourt	Liberation Stadium	2009
Enugu Rangers	Enugu	Nnamdi Azikiwe Stadium	1973
Enyimba	Aba	Enyimba International Stadium	1994
Gombe United	Gombe	Pantami Stadium	1994
Heartland	Owerri	Dan Anyiam Stadium	1975
Jigawa Golden Stars	Dutse	Hadejia Stadium	2011
Kaduna United	Kaduna	Kaduna Township Stadium	2008
Kano Pillars	Kano	Sani Abacha Stadium/Hadejia Stadium	2001
Kwara United	Ilorin	Kwara State Stadium	2009
Lobi Stars	Makurdi	Emmanuel Atongo Stadium, Katsina-Ala/Aper Aku Stadium/Old Parade Ground	1999
Niger Tornadoes	Minna	Minna Township Stadium	2003
Ocean Boys	Brass	Samson Siasia Stadium	2006
Rising Stars	Akure	Gateway Stadium (Ijebu Ode)/Akure Township Stadium	2011
Sharks	Port Harcourt	Sharks Stadium	2008
Shooting Stars	Ibadan	Awolowo Stadium/MKO Abiola Stadium, Abeokuta	2009
Sunshine Stars	Akure	Akure Township Stadium	2007
Warri Wolves	Warri	Warri Township Stadium	2008
Wikki Tourists	Bauchi	Abubarkar Tafawa Balewa Stadium	2011

=== League table ===
Pos	Team	Pld	W	D	L	GF	GA	GD	Pts	Qualification or relegation
1	Kano Pillars (C)	36	17	10	9	46	26	+20	61	Qualification for 2013 CAF Champions League
2	Enugu Rangers (Q)	36	17	7	12	45	27	+18	58	Qualification for 2013 CAF Champions League
3	Lobi Stars (Q)	36	18	3	15	38	30	+8	57	Qualification for 2013 CAF Confederation Cup
4	Enyimba	36	16	6	14	38	30	+8	54	
5	Sunshine Stars	36	15	7	14	41	35	+6	52	
6	Kwara United	36	16	4	16	35	36	−1	52	
7	Sharks	36	16	4	16	43	46	−3	52	
8	Heartland (Q)	36	14	9	13	32	30	+2	51 (Note: Heartland qualified for the 2013 CAF Confederation Cup as the 2012 Nigerian FA Cup winner.)	Qualification for 2013 CAF Confederation Cup
9	Gombe United	36	15	6	15	40	45	−5	51	
10	Wikki Tourists	36	16	3	17	33	46	−13	51	
11	Dolphins	36	15	5	16	37	39	−2	50	
12	Akwa United	36	15	5	16	27	31	−4	50	
13	Shooting Stars	36	14	7	15	31	34	−3	49	
14	Kaduna United	36	15	4	17	37	42	−5	49	
15	Warri Wolves	36	13	9	14	32	29	+3	48	
16	ABS	36	14	6	16	42	40	+2	48	
17	Niger Tornadoes (R)	36	14	6	16	38	42	−4	48	Relegated to Nigeria National League
18	Jigawa Golden Stars (R)	36	14	6	16	29	42	−13	48	Relegated to Nigeria National League
19	Rising Stars (R)	36	10	9	17	23	37	−14	39	Relegated to Nigeria National League
20	Ocean Boys (D)	0	-	-	-	-	-	—	0 (Note: Ocean Boys were disqualified September 6 after no-showing four straight games when their relegation was confirmed. All points/results of games involving them were expunged.)	Relegated to Nigeria National League

Updated to match(es) played on 9 Sept. 2012. Source: Nigeria Premier League
Rules for classification: 1) points; 2) goal difference; 3) number of goals scored.
(C) Champions; (D) Disqualified; (Q) Qualified for the phase indicated; (R) Relegated

=== News ===
- - In addition to the Kaduna United v Jigawa week 1 game, te entire week 2 schedule was postponed due to the nationwide general strike protesting the removal of the national fuel subsidy.
- - Two matchday 4 matches were cancelled: SUnshine Stars FC was robbed on the way to their game with Lobi, and Kano Pillars vs Enyimba was postponed after a bombing attributed to Boko Haram. Pillars eventually announced they were moving games to Jigawa's Hadeja Stadium. The league relented and allowed Pillars to play in Kano behind closed doors.
- - A week 11 match was postponed when Wikki Tourists were robbed on their way to Warri.

=== Team of the Year ===
From MTNFootball

- GK- Chigozie Agbim (Warri Wolves)
- DF- Namso Edo (Akwa United)
- DF- Mutiu Adegoke (3SC)
- DF- Azubuike Egwuekwe (Warri Wolves)
- DF- Godfrey Oboabona (Sunshine Stars F.C.)
- MF- Ejike Uzoenyi (Enugu Rangers)
- MF- Philip Asuquo (3SC)
- MF- Reuben Gabriel (Kano Pillars)
- FW- Mohammed Gambo (Kano Pillars)
- FW- Abdulrahman Bashir (ABS FC)
- FW- Sibi Gwar (Niger Tornadoes)
- Coach-Mohammed Baba Ganaru (Kano Pillars)

Reserves GK: Moses Ocheje (Sunshine Stars) D: ThankGod Ike (Warri Wolves) D/M:Chinedu Efugh (Heartland) M: David Tyavkase (Lobi Stars) M: Abduljaleel Ajagun (Dolphin) F: Dele Olorundare (Sunshine Stars) F: Chikeluba Ofoedu (Rangers)

=== Managerial (head coach) changes ===
Team	Outgoing manager	Manner of departure	Date of vacancy	Incoming manager	Date of appointment
Enyimba	Felix Emordi	Resigned	End of 2010-11 Season	Abdu Maikaba	Nov. 26 2011
Shooting Stars	Fatai Amoo	Resigned	End of 2010-11 Season	Festus Allen	Dec. 30 2011
Enugu Rangers	Alphonsus Dike	Resigned	End of 2010-11 Season	Felix Emordi	Dec. 23 2011
Wikki Tourists	Hassan Abubukar	Contract not renewed	End of 2010-11 Season	Ladan Bosso	Dec. 23 2011
Warri Wolves	Paul Aigbogun	Family reasons	Feb. 20, 2012	Maurice Cooreman	Feb. 20 2012
Kaduna United	Maurice Cooreman	Resigned	Feb. 20, 2012	Saleh Tanko Lato	
ABS	Erasmus Onuh	Sacked	Feb. 27, 2012	Kabiru Suleiman Dogo (interim)	Feb. 27, 2012
Shooting Stars	Festus Allen	Sacked	Mar. 26, 2012	Tunde Odubola/Busari Akeem	Mar. 26, 2012
