= Denis Nya =

Nigerian footballer

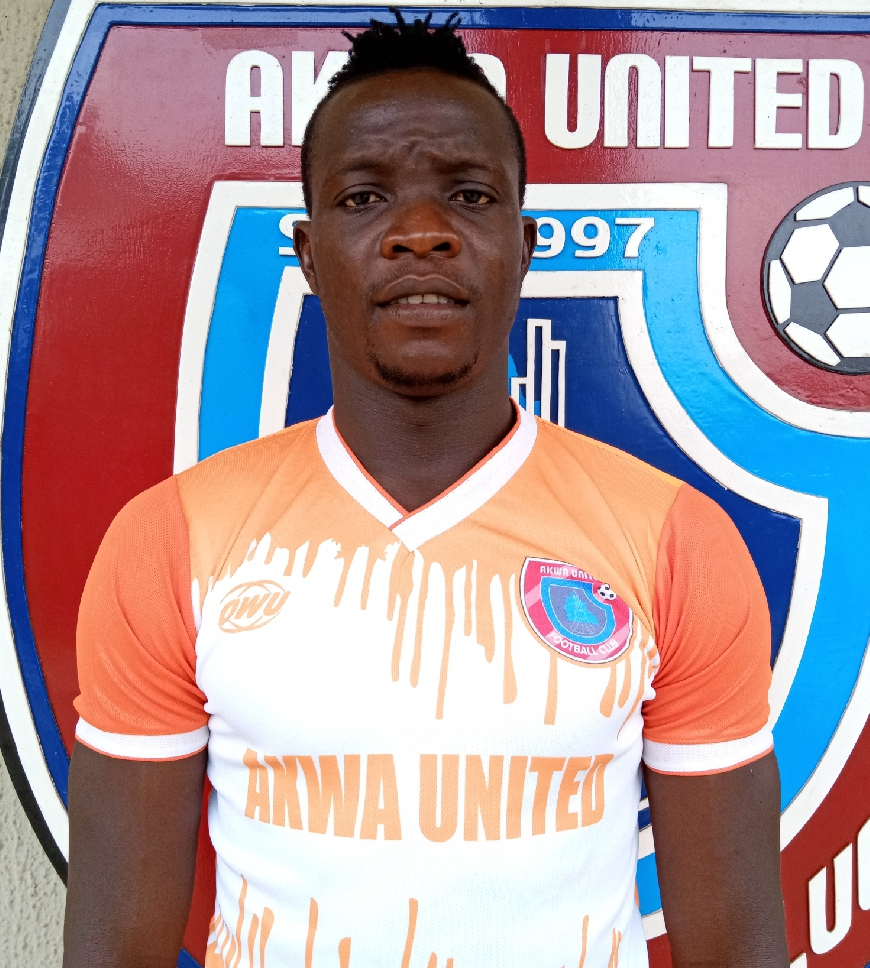

Personal information
- Date of birth: 1 December 1996 (age 29)
- Place of birth: Calabar, Nigeria
- Height: 1.78 m (5 ft 10 in)
- Position: Centre-back

Youth career
- 2011–2013: Canaan United

Senior career*
Years	Team	Apps	(Gls)
2013–2015	Ekiti United	?	(1)
2015–2017	Lobi Stars	?	(1)
2017–2020	Akwa United	62	(5)
2020–2021	Plateau United	14	(0)
2021–2023	Akwa United	16	(0)
- * Club domestic league appearances and goals as of 19 October 2022 ‡ National team caps and goals as of 8 May 2019

Denis Nya (born 1 December 1996) is a Nigerian professional footballer who plays as a central defender.

== Personal life ==
Born in Calabar, Nigeria, Nya is an indigene of Ini Local Government Area of Akwa Ibom State.

== Club career ==
Nya began his football career in 2011 with calabar-based academy and Nigeria nationwide league club, Canaan United, coached by former Super Eagles midfielder, John Okon Ene. While at Canaan United, he represented Cross River State in the men's football event at the Lagos 2012 National Sports Festival and won a silver medal. He joined Ekiti United, a Nigeria National League team during the 2013–14 Nigeria National League season to continue his development. He extended his stay with the Ekiti United F.C. until the end of 2014–15 season.

At the start of the 2015–2016 season, Nya signed for Nigerian topflight side Lobi Stars. In his first season with the Makurdi-based club, he scored in the final of the 2016 Benue State FA Cup against Dreams FC. The following season, he netted his first professional goal from the spot to help Lobi Stars from a goal down to beat Akwa United 2-1, in a match-day 16 tie at the Aper Aku Stadium.

In November 2017, Nya finalized his move from Lobi Stars to Akwa United and was unveiled by the club management alongside 15 new players at the Godswill Akpabio International Stadium on Saturday, 6 January 2018.

Nya scored in his debut for Akwa United on the opening day of the 2017–18 NPFL season against Enugu Rangers in Uyo, to ensure the Promise Keepers recorded a 2-0 win over Enugu Rangers – their first victory over the Flying Antelopes in three seasons. He scored the second goal of the match twenty minutes into the second half. Nya scored his second league goal of the season at the Confluence Stadium in Lokoja, as Akwa United got a 2-1 win against Niger Tornadoes. Nya scored his third league goal of the 2017–18 Nigeria Professional Football League season for Akwa United in the 2-1 home win over Enyimba in a rescheduled match at the Godswill Akpabio International Stadium.

During Akwa United's 2018 CAF Confederation Cup campaign, Nya played all six games and scored a goal for the 2015 and 2017 Aiteo Cup winner, before they were eliminated by Al-Hilal Club of Sudan in the Round of 32.

On Wednesday, 29 May 2019, Nya won Dana Air Akwa United Player for the month of April, following his outstanding performances for the Promise Keepers in the 2018–19 NPFL home win against Gombe United and Kano Pillars and a 3-0 loss at Plateau United.

== International career ==
Nya scaled through the open screening held by Coach Manu Garba for under-17 players at the U. J. Esuene Stadium in Calabar, after the Morocco 2013 CAF Under-17 Championship in July 2013. He starred for the Under-17 team in the 1-0 win over Akwa United reserve team in a World Cup preparatory game at the Uyo Township Stadium on Wednesday, 28 August 2013.

On 3 October 2013, he was named in Golden Eaglets' final 21-man squad for the UAE 2013 FIFA Under-17 World Cup, but did not feature in any match, as the team went ahead to claim their fourth title.

== Career statistics ==
=== Club ===
Professional Goals

As of 24 April 2019

No	Date	Venue	Team	Opponent	Score	Result	Competition
1.	30 March 2017	Aper Aku Stadium, Makurdi, Nigeria	Lobi Stars	Akwa United	1–1	2–1	2016–17 NPFL Matchday 16
2.	14 January 2018	Godswill Akpabio International Stadium, Uyo, Nigeria	Akwa United	Enugu Rangers	2–0	2–0	2017–18 NPFL Matchday 1
3.	25 January 2018	Confluence Stadium, Lokoja, Nigeria	Akwa United	Niger Tornadoes	1–0	2–1	2017–18 NPFL Matchday 4
4.	18 April 2018	Godswill Akpabio International Stadium, Uyo, Nigeria	Akwa United	Al-Hilal Club	1–1	3–1	2018 CAF Confederation Cup, Round of 32
5.	30 May 2018	Godswill Akpabio International Stadium, Uyo, Nigeria	Akwa United	Enyimba	1–0	2–1	2017–18 NPFL Matchday 20

== Honours ==
=== International ===
- FIFA U-17 World Cup
  - UAE 2013 FIFA U-17 World Cup

(gold) Champion Nigeria U-17

=== National ===
- National Sports Festival
  - Lagos 2012 National Sports Festival men's football event

(silver) Runners-up Cross River State

=== Individual ===
  - Dana Air / Akwa United Player of the Month

(gold) Winner April 2019
