= Jamiu Alimi =

Nigerian footballer (born 1992)

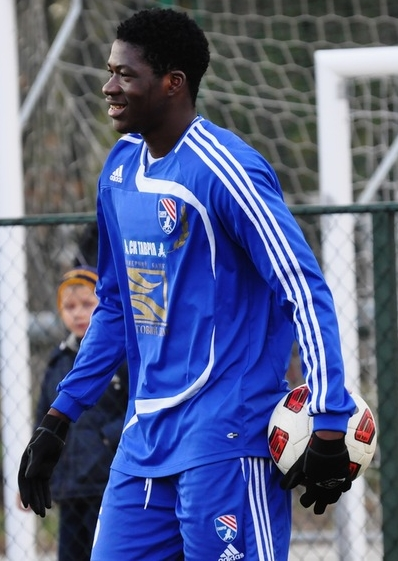

Personal information
- Full name: Jamiu Abiodun Alimi
- Date of birth: 5 October 1992 (age 34)
- Place of birth: Lagos, Nigeria
- Height: 1.90 m (6 ft 3 in)
- Position: Centre back

Team information
- Current team: Sunshine Stars

Youth career
- Westerlo
- Metalurh Donetsk

Senior career*
Years	Team	Apps	(Gls)
2011–2012	Tavriya Simferopol	9	(0)
2012–2013	Olympiakos Nicosia	6	(0)
2014	Sharks		
2015	Shooting Stars		
2016–2017	Kano Pillars		
2018–2019	Akwa United		
2019	→ El-Kanemi (loan)		
2019–	Sunshine Stars		

International career^{‡}
2015–2016	Nigeria	4	(0)
- * Club domestic league appearances and goals as of 11:56, 16 November 2018 (UTC) ‡ National team caps and goals as of 11:56, 16 November 2018 (UTC)

Jamiu Abiodun Alimi (born 5 October 1992) is a Nigerian international footballer who plays for Sunshine Stars, as a central defender.

== Club career ==
Born in Lagos, Alimi spent his early career with Westerlo and Metalurh Donetsk. He later played for Tavriya Simferopol, Olympiakos Nicosia, Sharks, Shooting Stars, Kano Pillars and Akwa United.

Jamiu joined Akwa United on a two-year deal from Kano Pillars, during the 2017–18 mid-season transfer window. On 27 February 2019, he was loaned out to El-Kanemi for the rest of the season because of lack of playing time after falling out of favour with Akwa United manager Rafael Everton. In September 2019 it was confirmed that he had joined Sunshine Stars.

== International career ==
He made his international debut for Nigeria in 2015.
