= Bassey Akpan =

Nigerian footballer (born 1984)

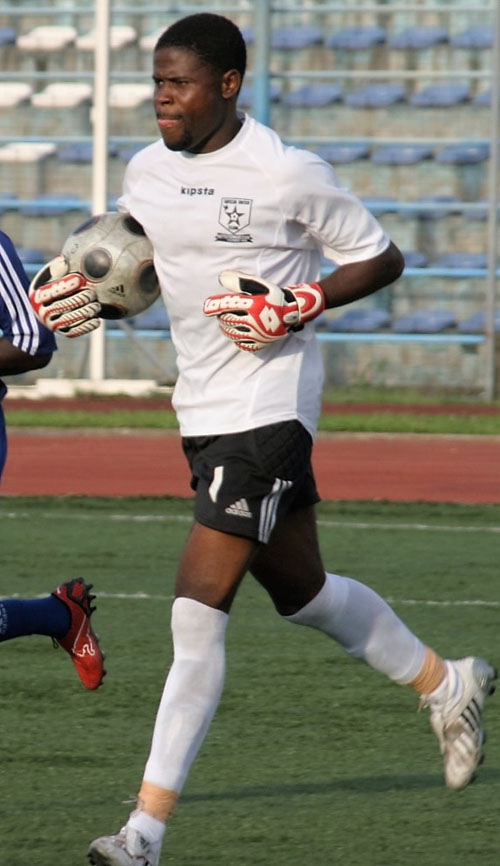
- Akpan playing for Bayelsa United

Personal information
- Full name: Bassey Akpan
- Date of birth: 6 January 1984 (age 42)
- Place of birth: Eket, Akwa Ibom State, Nigeria
- Height: 1.86 m (6 ft 1 in)
- Position: Goalkeeper

Youth career
- 1998–1999: Delta Force Academy
- 1999–2001: Bright Stars Football Academy

Senior career*
Years	Team	Apps	(Gls)
2001–2002	Bayelsa United	10	(0)
2002–2003	Sunshine Stars	28	(0)
2003–2006	Kwara United	61	(0)
2006–2008	Bayelsa United	24	(0)
2008–2009	→ Heartland (loan)	20	(0)
2009–2010	Bayelsa United	30	(0)
2010–2011	Heartland	17	(0)
2012–2014	Hoàng Anh Gia Lai	57	(0)
2014–2015	Bayelsa United	5	(0)
2014–2015	→ Abia Warriors (loan)	6	(0)
2015–2016	Akwa United	16	(0)
2016–2018	Enugu Rangers	7	(0)
2018	Sunshine Stars		
2019	Kano Pillars		
2019–2021	Akwa United	0	(0)
2021–2022	Kano Pillars	7	(0)

International career
2001	Nigeria U17	15	(0)
2003	Nigeria U20	3	(0)
2003–2004	Nigeria U23	4	(0)
2008–2010	Nigeria	10	(0)
- * Club domestic league appearances and goals

Bassey Abobo Akpan (born 6 January 1984) is a retired Nigerian professional footballer who last played as a goalkeeper for NPFL club Kano Pillars.

== Club career ==
Born in Eket, Nigeria, Akpan began his career with Delta Force Academy of Asaba. He was part of the team that placed third at the 1998 Nike Premier Cup in Paris, France. He later joined Bright Stars Football Academy In 1999.

During the 1999 Nike Premier Cup Africa playoffs in lagos, Akpan put up an impressive performance for the Port-Harcourt-based Academy and was voted the best goalkeeper of the under-15 tournament.

Akpan signed his first professional contract with southern Nigerian club, Bayelsa United in 2001, where he spent the entire 2001–02 season.

He switched to Sunshine Stars, where he played for the rest of 2002–03 season, before teaming up with Kwara United for the 2003–04 season, following the relegation of the Akure-based club to second tier.

He extended his contract with the Afonja Warriors for two seasons, before joining Bayelsa United for a second spell at the start of the 2006–07 season.

After two seasons with Bayelsa United, Akpan secured a loan move to Heartland FC during the 2008–09 season where he helped the Naze Millionaires reach the final of the 2009 CAF Champions League for the first time in their history.

At the expiration of his season long loan at Heartland in August 2009, Akpan returned to his parent club Bayelsa United for the 2009–10 season, before they exited the 2009 CAF Confederation Cup at the semi-finals.

He rejoined Heartland ahead of the 2010-11 season, after Bayelsa United relegated at the end of 2009-10 NPFL season. He ended the season winning the 2011 Nigerian FA Cup title.

In October 2011, Akpan signed for Vietnam first division club, Hoang Anh Gia Lai FC for the 2012 V-League season.

He ended his debut season with the Best Goalkeeper Award, following his outstanding performance in 20 league games, which propelled Hoang Anh Gia Lai FC to a fifth-place finish on a 14-team table.

Akpan extended his stay with Hoang Anh Gia Lai FC for two seasons until 17 August 2014.

He returned home to join Bayelsa United for the 2014-15 NPFL season, playing three games for the Yenagoa-based club, before moving to Abia Warriors on loan for the rest of the season.

He joined his hometown club, Akwa United during the 2015-16 NPFL season.

Before the commencement of the regular season, Akpan won the 2016 Super Four and the Nigeria Super Cup with the Promise Keepers. He was part of the team during their maiden CAF Confederation Cup campaign.

He made 16 league appearances for the Uyo-based club including a vital goalless draw at Abia Warriors in a matchday 30 tie at Umuahia Township Stadium on 7 August 2016.

Akpan signed for 2015-16 NPFL champions, Enugu Rangers during the midseason of the 2016-17 NPFL.

Akpan joined Sunshine Stars FC for a second spell during the 2018-19 season and was unveiled alongside 23 others at the Ondo State Sports Complex on Saturday 19 January 2019.

He did not feature for the Akure Gunners as they ended the 2018-19 abridged league season on the eighth position - one place above relegation zone.

== International career ==
Akpan's exploits at the 1998 and 1999 Nike International Premier Cup in Paris and Barcelona, earned him an invitation to the Nigeria under-17 team for the 2001 Africa U-17 Cup of Nations qualifiers in 2000.

On 3 March 2001, he inspired the Golden Eaglets to its first continental title at the 2001 African U-17 Championship in Seychelles with a 3–0 victory over Burkina Faso.

At the FIFA U-17 World Cup in Trinidad & Tobago, Akpan was voted Best Goalkeeper of the tournament due to his heroics in goal, despite the Golden Eaglets losing 3–0 to France in the finals to settle for a silver medal.

In 2002, he was involved with the Flying Eagles team that failed to qualify for the Burkina Faso 2003 CAF U-20 Championship.

From June 2003 to March 2004, Akpan was a member of the Nigeria U-23 team and took part in the CAF qualifiers as the team failed to secure a ticket for the Athens 2004 Summer Olympics Men's football event

In 2008, Bassey was in goal for the Home-based Super Eagles during the Ivory Coast 2009 African Nations Championship WAFU Zone B qualifiers, helping coach Okey Emordi led team to beat Burkina Faso 4–1 on aggregate in the first round, before losing 3–2 on aggregate to Ghana in the final qualifying round.

He made his senior debut for the Super Eagles on 3 March 2010, as an 80th minute substitute for Shooting Stars goalkeeper, Segun Oluwaniyi in the 5–2 win over Congo DR in Abuja.

Bassey manned the post for the coach Samson Siasia tutored Home-based Super Eagles during the second leg goalless draw with Niger in the Sudan 2011 African Nations Championship WAFU Zone B qualifier on 28 March 2010.

He kept four matches for coach Daniel Amokachi led homebased Super Eagles, as they went all the way to beat the Teranga Lions of Senegal 2–0 to claim the maiden edition of the 2010 WAFU Nations Cup at the MKO Abiola Stadium Abeokuta on Sunday, 18 April 2010.

In May 2010, Akpan alongside Terna Suswam was the only home-based players named in Super Eagles' preparatory squad for the 2010 FIFA World Cup by Coach Lars Lagerback, but did not make the final squad.

He was a used substitute during the Super Eagles' 0–0 draw with Saudi Arabia in a pre-World Cup friendly in Austria on 25 May 2010.

He also served as back up to goalkeeper Dele Aiyenugba in the Super Eagles 2–1 loss to South Korea in an international friendly at the Suwon World Cup Stadium, on 11 August 2010.

== Honours ==
=== International ===
Nigeria U-17

- FIFA U-17 World Cup winner: 2001
- CAF U-17 Championship winner: 2001

Nigeria

- WAFU Nations Cup winner: 2010

=== Club ===
==== National ====
Bayelsa United

- Nigerian Professional Football League winner: 2008-09

Heartland FC

- Nigerian FA Cup winner: 2011

Akwa United

- Nigeria Super Cup winner: 2016
- Nigeria Super Four winner: 2016

==== International ====
Heartland FC

- CAF Champions League runners up: 2009

=== Individual ===
- 2001 FIFA U-17 World Championship Golden Glove winner
- 2010 WAFU Nations Cup Golden Glove winner
- 2012 V-League Best Goalkeeper
