= Najeem Olukokun =

Nigerian footballer

Kunle Olukokun
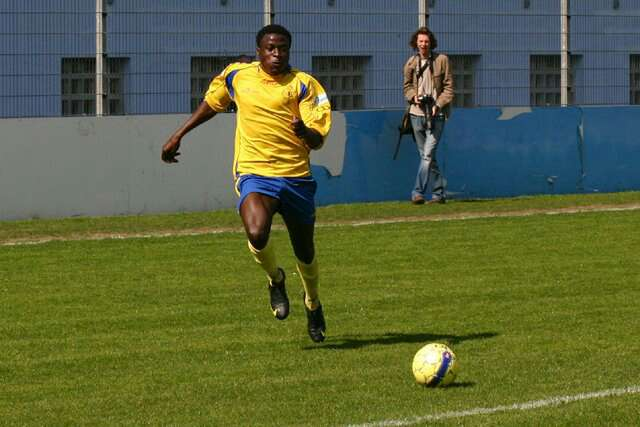

Personal information
- Full name: Najeem Olaitan Olukokun
- Date of birth: 27 December 1990 (age 35)
- Place of birth: Oyo, Nigeria
- Height: 1.85 m (6 ft 1 in)
- Position: Striker

Team information
- Current team: Jawornik Gorzków

Youth career
- Steeb Football Academy

Senior career*
| Years | Team | Apps | (Gls) |
- Prime
- Hidd SCC
- Niger Tornadoes
| 2010 | → Union SG (loan) | 11 | (8) |
| 2010–2011 | Union SG | | |
| 2012 | Rising Stars | | |
- Kwara United
- Shooting Stars
- Nasarawa United
- Lobi Stars
- Shooting Stars
| 2025– | Jawornik Gorzków | 0 | (0) |
- * Club domestic league appearances and goals as of 21:53, 15 March 2025 (UTC)

Najeem Olaitan "Kunle" Olukokun (born 27 December 1990) is a Nigerian footballer who plays as a striker for Klasa A club Jawornik Gorzków.

== Career ==
Olukokun began his career in the Steeb Football Academy and was then 2007 scouted by Prime. He earned his first professional caps for Prime in the Nigerian Premier League. In early 2010, he was loaned out to Belgian club Union SG. After exercising their buy option, Union SG signed Olukokun on a permanent basis in July 2010.

In April 2012, Olukokun returned to Nigeria to join top-flight side Rising Stars. In 2013, he played for Kwara United. He also won the Nigeria Player Of the Week in week three of the Nigeria Professional Football League.

In 2014, he joined Shooting Stars. After six appearances in week six, he scored three goals in six games. He scored 20 goals in 48 league appearances during his stay at Shooting Stars.

During the 2018–19 CAF Champions League season, he made three appearances for Lobi Stars.

On 5 March 2025, Olukokun joined Polish Klasa A club Jawornik Gorzków.
