= Cooreman =

Cooreman is a surname. Notable people with the surname include:

- Davy Cooreman (born 1971), Belgian football player and manager
- Gérard Cooreman (1852–1926), Belgian politician and Prime Minister
- Maurice Cooreman (1943–2022), Belgian football manager
- Roger Cooreman (born 1941), Belgian racing cyclist
- Steve Cooreman (born 1976), Belgian football player
