= Mohammed Gambo =

Nigerian footballer

Muhammed
Personal information
- Full name: Muhammad Gambo
- Date of birth: 10 March 1988 (age 38)
- Place of birth: Kano, Nigeria
- Height: 1.87 m (6 ft 2 in)
- Position: Forward

Team information
- Current team: Katsina United F.C.

Youth career
- 2000–2006: Abuja F.C.

Senior career*
Years	Team	Apps	(Gls)
2005-2006	Abuja F.C.		
2006–2018	Kano Pillars	200	(70)
2019–	Katsina United F.C.	4	(1)

International career
2013–2015	Nigeria	4	(1)
- * Club domestic league appearances and goals as of 7 June 2013

Muhammad Gambo (born 10 March 1988), also known as Muhammed, is a footballer who plays for Nigerian club Katsina United F.C. as a forward.

== Club career ==
Gambo moved to his current club Kano Pillars from Buffalo F.C. in 2006 and has since been a sensation for his current club scoring over 60 goals in league and cup competitions. He was tipped to replace Ekigho Ehiosun at Turkish club Samsunspor in the August transfer window after scoring 15 goals in the Nigerian league in the 2012 season with 5 goals in the Cup. In July 2013 he was close to signing with Tunisian club, Club Africain, but contract negotiations broke down. Post 2015 his career graph dipped due to injury.

== International career ==
Gambo Muammed was called up to the Nigerian national football team otherwise known as the Super Eagles by Former coach Samson Siasia for a tournament in America but could not make his debut due to the competition being cancelled.

In March 2013 Gambo was an unused substitute in a 1–1 draw against Kenya national football team in the 2014 FIFA World Cup qualification (CAF) in Nigeria.

In June 2013 he was selected by Nigerian coach Stephen Keshi to represent Nigeria in the 2013 FIFA Confederations Cup He was one of the 8 locally based players that made the list, the only striker and has widely been regarded as one of the best strikers in the Nigeria Premier League in the last few seasons On 6 July 2013, Gambo got his first international goal when he scored for Nigeria's B team in the CAF CHAN qualifier against Côte d'Ivoire at the Ahmadu Bello Stadium, Kaduna.

== Personal life ==
Gambo watches videos of The Great Brazilian Ronaldo and is a Big Fan. As quoted Below from Fifa.com Muhammad Gambo is one of several Nigerian-based players that Super Eagles coach Stephen Keshi has called up for the FIFA Confederations Cup Brazil 2013. However, unlike most of the other locally based players, Gambo is not a talented youngster embarking on his career, but a seasoned professional, who has spent several seasons campaigning in the Nigerian top flight. The 25-year-old also brings the experience of playing in the CAF Champions League with him, having advanced to the semi-finals with Kano Pillars in 2009. The Kano captain last year seemed close to moving to Turkey, but the transfer fell through in the end. It is not something that causes him great consternation. "I don't want to rush anything, when it is time I will go and play in Europe." Gambo was first called up to the Super Eagles in 2010 but the matches were cancelled and he had to wait on the sidelines until he was given the nod by Keshi recently for Nigeria's friendly against Mexico, two 2014 FIFA World Cup qualifiers as well as the Confederations Cup. The tournament provides Gambo with an opportunity to play in the country of his idol, Ronaldo. "I want to be like Ronaldo of Brazil. He is my role model. It will be great to be like him. I want to make a name for myself as he did," he recently told journalists.

He was one of five Pillars players injured during an armed robbery as the club was headings south for their 2015 Nigeria Professional Football League opener against Heartland FC.

== Honours ==
=== Club ===
Kano Pillars F.C.

- Nigerian Premier League

Champions (3): 2007–08, 2011–12, 2014
Runners-up (1): 2009–10

- Nigerian Super Cup

Runners-up (1): 2012

=== Individual ===
2012 Nigeria Premier League

Selected in team of the year, Runner-up Top Scorer (15 goals)
