= Ivo Sajh =

Personal information
- Full name: Ivo von Sajh-Scheich
- Date of birth: 21 January 1953 (age 73)
- Place of birth: Ljubljana, Slovenia, SFR Yugoslavia
- Position: Striker

Youth career
- 1965–1971: Slovan

Senior career*
Years	Team	Apps	(Gls)
1972–1986	Ljubljana (indoor)		

Managerial career
- 1978: FC Dobrova
- 1992–1993: Asmaral (techn.adv.)
- 1994: Potrosnik Beltinci
- 1998: India (Technical Director)
- 1998: India U-17
- 1998: India U-20
- 2000: India
- 2000: Myanmar (Director of Coaching)
- 2001: Myanmar
- 2001–2002: FC Tahaddi
- 2002: AFC (Development Programme)
- 2003: Jasper United
- 2005: FCM Târgoviște
- 2008: Olympic Azzaweya
- 2009: Kano Pillars
- 2017: Tuvalu
- * Club domestic league appearances and goals

Ivo von Sajh-Scheich (born on 21 January 1953 in Ljubljana), is a Slovenian and Yugoslavian former football player who last worked as the head coach of Tuvalu national football team.

== Career ==
He played for ND Slovan on the youth side from 1965 until injuries and a knee surgery in a youth championship ended his professional career in 1971. A year later, he started playing indoor football until 1986.

In 1979, he organized the first Slovenian futsal Championship.

== Coaching career ==
Sajh began his coaching career in 1978 for FC Dobrova who were runners-up in the 1978/1979 season. He was then from 1992 to 1993 technical advisor for FC Asmaral. In 1994, he returned to Slovenia and signed for FC Potrosnik Beltinci, during his time with FC Potrosnik Beltinci he coached the team to 6th place of the PrvaLiga Telekom Slovenije, the best result in the history of the club.

Before his work as the technical director/ national coach of all Indian national teams, he issued a book named Technical- Tactical preparation of Footballer and Technical- Tactical preparation of the Team.

During his time with the Myanmar Football Federation between 2000 and 2001 he lost just one match.

In the year 2001 he prepared a six- year development program for the Asian Football Confederation. In the same period in Asia he prepared and guided coaching seminars for local coaches.

He took over as coach of Al Tahaddy, a football team from Benghazi where he qualified them for the 2002 CAF Cup but eventually lost to FUS Rabat at the first round.

In 2005, he was in charge of Romanian club FCM Targoviste where for more than three months he did not lose any league or cup match; a feat he repeated with Libyan side Olympic Azzaweya three years later. FIFA awarded him for his contribution in the development of football in Asia and his native country Slovenia.

=== Nigeria Internationals ===
His boys, Theophilus Afelokhai, Gabriel Ikechukwu, Abdulwasiu Showemimo, Solomon Okpako, Muhammad Shagari, Ali Rabiu, Bello Musa Kofarmata, Mohammad Gambo and Ahmed Musa have played for Nigeria at various levels at the African Nations Cup, FIFA Confederations Cup and the FIFA World Cup.

=== CAF Champions League semi-final ===
He led Nigerian side Kano Pillars to the semifinal of the CAF Champions League where they lost to another Nigerian club, Heartland. He was named African Coach of the Year that year.

=== Pattern ===
He is the first coach to use a new playing system (1-2-2-1-1-1-2 in defense, 2-2-2-1-3 in attack). The system could only be used efficiently by teams with excellent skills. He named his system Pahljača which means "fan" in his native Slovenian.

=== Tuvalu and the Oceania Football Confederation ===
His last job was in Tuvalu where he educated local coaches on several coaching seminars and where he was also the national football team coach. During his stay in Tuvalu, he helped the Tuvalu Islands Football Association to prepare documents for admission of Tuvalu as members of FIFA and the OFC.

== Humanitarian activities ==
In April 1984, Ivo Sajh organized a basketball match between the 1970s Yugoslavia world basketball champions and the 1984 national basketball team of Yugoslavia, who finished third at the Olympic Games later that year. The match ended 100:96 (54:50) for the 1970s team. The game had a purely humanitarian purpose, as all the proceeds went for the construction of the Ljubljana maternity hospital.

== Honours ==
- 1979: Slovenian regional league runners-up
- 2009: CAF Champions League semi-finalist
