= Sibi Gwar =

Nigerian footballer

Personal information
- Date of birth: 9 September 1987 (age 39)
- Place of birth: Gboko, Nigeria
- Height: 1.75 m (5 ft 9 in)
- Position: Striker

Team information
- Current team: Nasarawa United F.C.

Youth career
- 1991–1998: Government Secondary School Gboko

Senior career*
Years	Team	Apps	(Gls)
2001–2003	BCC Lions FC	30	(12)
2004–2005	Ebonyi Angels F.C.	26	(14)
2005–2006	Kwara United F.C.	20	(11)
2006–2007	Enyimba	30	(15)
2008–2009	Lobi Stars F.C.	18	(10)
2009–2011	Enyimba	15	(8)
2011 – 2012	Kwara United F.C.	22	(12)
2012 – 2013	Niger Tornadoes F.C.	30	(17)
2013–2014	Enyimba	10	(7)
2014–2016	Shooting Stars SC		
2016–17	Victoria Hotspurs F.C.		
2017–	Nasarawa United F.C.		

International career
2012	Nigeria	1	(0)
- * Club domestic league appearances and goals as of 21 November 2012

Sibi Gwar (born 9 September 1987 in Gboko) is a Nigerian football player who plays for Nasarawa United F.C. in the Nigeria Premier League.

== Early life ==
Gwar hails from Gboko in Konshisha local government area of Benue State and attended the Government Secondary School, Gboko (1991–1998).

== Career ==
He began his career with Ebonyi Angels. After 1 year with Kwara he moved to Enyimba International F.C. in early 2008 and returned to Lobi in June 2008. After a successful season with Lobi and winning the NFA Golden Boot, Gwar signed with his former club Kwara United in 2009.

At Kwara United FC he scored nine league goals. In June 2010, Argentine football coach Rodolfo Zapata, the former coach of Sunshine Stars FC, named Gwar in a list of players he thought should form the basis of the future Nigeria national football team. Sibi was described as a "Speedy attacker, quick with the ball, eye for goals, good finisher and dangerous in the goal box."

He signed with Niger Tornadoes in spring 2011, and scored the winning goal in a 2-1 win over his former Kwara United team on 11 May. He scored six goals in his first three games with Tornadoes.

In June 2012 Sibi Gwar became the highest goal scorer in the Nigeria Premier League after scoring a brace against his former team Kwara United and taking his goal tally to 12 goals.

Sibi was named as the Nigerian league player of the week in May 2012, He was again named as the league's Star of the week for the second straight week in June 2012 and was league player of the year.

He signed with Enyimba in November 2012 on a one-year deal. On 2 August 2015, Sibi Gwar joined Shooting Stars SC After leaving Shooting to join Victoria Hotspurs F.C.in Malta, he returned to Nigeria on deadline day and signed with Nasarawa United. Gwar has won the NFF Golden Boot twice, during the 2008 and 2012 Nigeria Premier League seasons.

== International career ==
Gwar received his first callup to the Super Eagles in August 2012, when he was named in Stephen Keshi's squad for a friendly against Niger.
