= Super 4 =

Super 4 may refer to:

- Super 4 (2014 TV series), a French-German animated television series
- Super 4 (Indian TV series), a Malayalam language musical reality show
- Super 4 (Nigeria), a football competition in Nigeria
