= Reuben Ogbonnaya =

Nigerian footballer

Reuben Ogbonnaya is a Nigerian professional footballer who plays for Lobi Stars F.C. of Makurdi.
