= Ikechukwu Kalu =

Nigerian footballer

Ike Kalu
Personal information
- Full name: Ikechukwu Kalu
- Date of birth: 18 April 1984 (age 42)
- Place of birth: Kaduna, Nigeria
- Height: 1.73 m (5 ft 8 in)
- Positions: Striker; attacking midfielder

Youth career
- 1998–2002: Jasper United
- 2002–2003: Sampdoria

Senior career*
Years	Team	Apps	(Gls)
2003–2007	AC Milan	0	(0)
2003–2004	→ Pro Patria (loan)	28	(4)
2004–2005	→ Pisa (loan)	26	(2)
2005–2007	→ Chiasso (loan)	48	(28)
2007–2008	→ Sampdoria (loan)	5	(0)
2008–2010	AC Bellinzona	20	(1)
2010–2011	Chiasso	19	(4)
2012	KuPS		
2013	Jaro		
2013	AC Bellinzona		
2014	Teuta Durrës	10	(0)
2014–2015	Singhtarua	7	(2)
2020–2021	Agno		

International career
2003–2008	Nigeria	3	(1)
- * Club domestic league appearances and goals

Ikechukwu Kalu (born 18 April 1984) is a Nigerian former footballer who played as a striker. His name, Ikechukwu, means "Power of God".

== Football career ==
He started his career at Jasper United in Nigeria. He was signed by Sampdoria in summer 2002. After playing one season in Genoa, AC Milan signed him in summer 2003 in joint-ownership bid for €1 million, and saw Luca Antonini move to opposite direction in joint-ownership deal (for €2 million), and sent him on loan to Pisa and Chiasso. He scored 28 goals in 44 games in two season in Swiss second division, which saw Sampdoria recall him in summer 2007. He made his Serie A debut on 10 November 2007 against Empoli

In June 2008, Sampdoria bought back Kalu from Milan for €250,000 and co-currently signed Paolo Sammarco outright for another €2.5 million. Kalu then sold to the Swiss side AC Bellinzona for €400,000.
