= Afeez Awakan =

Nigerian footballer (born 2000)

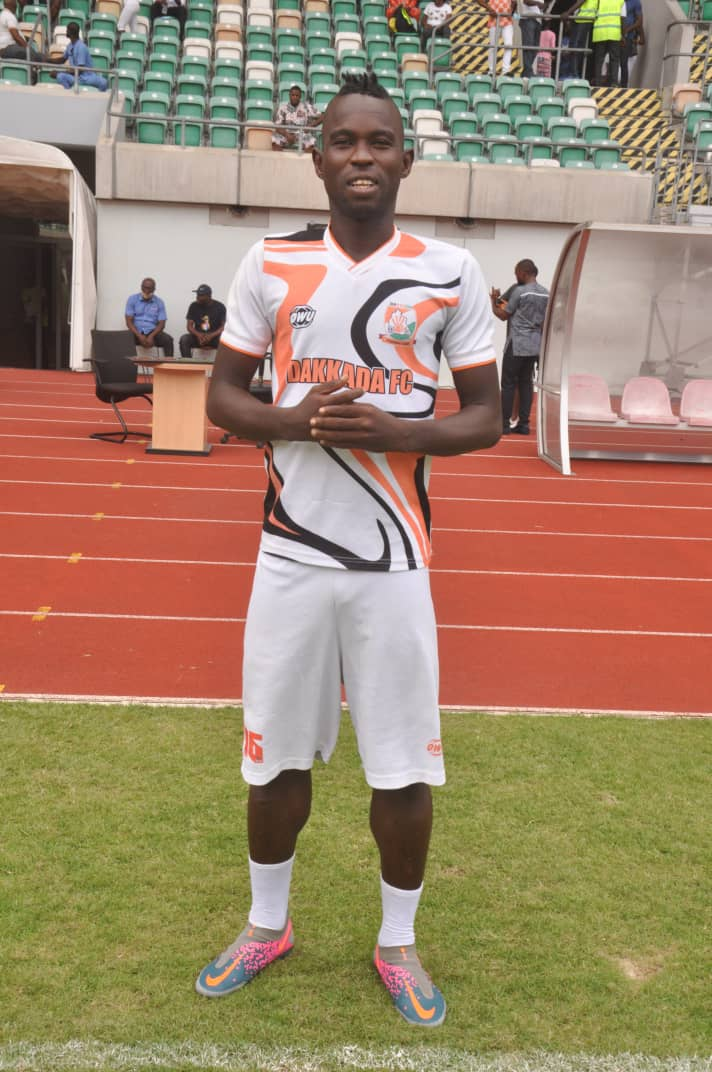
- Afeez Awakan at Godswill Akpabio Stadium on 16 May 2021

Personal information
- Full name: Afeez Olawale Awakan
- Date of birth: 22 June 2000 (age 26)
- Place of birth: Lagos, Nigeria
- Position: Defensive midfielder

Team information
- Current team: Dakkada FC
- Number: 40

Youth career
- 2008 - 2009: FC Ebedei
- 2009 - 2010: FC Abuja

Senior career*
Years	Team	Apps	(Gls)
2010 - 2011	Shooting Stars	2	(0)
2011 - 2013	Sunshine Stars	?	(?)
2013 - 2014	Kwara United	?	(?)
2013 - 2014	Crown	?	(?)
2014 - 2016	Akwa United	16	(4)
2016 - 2017	Enugu Rangers	4	(0)
2017 - 2018	Swehly Club	0	(0)
2018 - 2020	?	?	(?)
2021 -	Dakkada	7	(0)
- * Club domestic league appearances and goals as of 12 June 2021

Afeez Awakan born (22 June 2000) is a first-team player of Dakkada FC. He is a utility player who can play as a defensive midfielder and winger.

== Personal life ==
Awakan is a native of Ogun, Nigeria.

== Club career ==
Awakan started his football career at FC Ebiede in 2011.

He made a name for himself while playing for Akwa United. On 15 November 2015, Awakan scored the only goal against Lobi Stars in the final matchday of the 2014–15 season, at the Nest of Champions to help Akwa United maintain their top-flight status.

On 22 November 2015, Awakan won the Nigeria FA Cup with Akwa United. His goal alongside Namdo Edo's strike earned the Uyo club a 2–1 win over Lobi Stars in the final at Teslim Balogun Stadium.

Awakan was voted Most Valuable Player of the tournament.

Awakan moved to Enugu Rangers from Akwa United alongside Fortune Omoniwari at the beginning of the 2016–17 season.

He is currently at Dakkada for the 2020-21 NPFL season

== Club honours ==
- Nigerian FA Cup

Federation Cup 2015 with Akwa United

== Individual honours ==
- Most Valuable Player

Federation Cup 2015
