= Abdulrahman Bashir =

Nigerian footballer (born 1991)

Personal information
- Full name: Abdulrahman Bolakale Bashir
- Date of birth: 15 January 1991 (age 35)
- Place of birth: Zaria, Nigeria
- Height: 1.80 m (5 ft 11 in)
- Position: Forward

Team information
- Current team: Plateau United

Senior career*
Years	Team	Apps	(Gls)
2013–2015	ABS FC		
2015–	Enyimba		
2015–2016	Lobi Stars (loan)		
2016–2017	Nasarawa United		
2017–2020	Enyimba		
2020–	Plateau United		
- * Club domestic league appearances and goals

Abdulrahman Bashir (born 15 January 1991) is a Nigerian footballer who plays as a forward for Nigeria Professional Football League club Plateau United

== Personal life ==
Bashir is a native of Kwara State. He idolises Wayne Rooney and likes listening to music and watching movies in his spare time.

== Club career ==
=== Domestic competitions ===
Bashir began his professional career at ABS after graduating from the Ilorin club's Academy.

In 2012, Bashir—an ABS player at the time—went for trials at Sporting Charleroi. He impressed during the trials and scored in an exhibition game against FC Charleroi, but returned to ABS soon after the trials following ABS's rejection of a loan deal offered by the Belgian club.

Bashir joined Enyimba from ABS FC in 2014 following the Ilorin club's relegation from the top-flight at the end of the 2012–2013 season. He scored a hat-trick in his first competitive match for Enyimba—against Bayelsa United in the 2013-14 Glo NPFL Pre-season Super Four tournament.

During the 2014-15 mid-season transfer window, Bashir made a loan move to Lobi Stars, who were in danger of relegation. He helped the north-central club finish 14th in the 20-team log.

Bashir joined Nasarawa United at the start of the 2015–2016 season.

In 2016, despite earning a reputation as one of the top strikers in the NPFL, Bashir was left out of the final NPFL All-star squad to Spain for an international pre-season tour. The striker, though, featured for the NPFL All-Stars during the tour, following a late invitation. He played in all of the NPFL All-Stars matches during the tour—against Malaga, Atletico Madrid and Valencia. Bashir scored against Atletico Madrid, as goals from Nicolas Gaitan and Diego Godin gave the Spanish club a 2–1 victory over the NPFL All-Stars team.

He helped Nasarawa United finish the 2016-17 NPFL season in fifth place, before returning to Enyimba for a second stint at the start of 2017–2018 season. In a rescheduled Matchday 21 fixture—played at the U.J Esuene Stadium, Calabar on Wednesday, 6 June 2018—Bashir earned Enyimba a 1–0 win over his former club Lobi Stars through a second-half header. Bashir made 10 league appearances, scoring two goals.

Bashir scored three goals in four matches for Enyimba during the 2018-19 NPFL play-offs at the Agege Stadium, Lagos, in June 2019. After sitting out the 1–0 win over Enugu Rangers in the opening game on 4 June 2019, he fired blanks in the 2–0 loss to Kano Pillars two days later. Bashir scored in all of his side's last three games in the competition—the 3–1 victory over Lobi Stars on 8 June 2019; the 3–1 win over Ifeanyi Ubah on 10 June 2019; and the 1–0 win over Akwa United on 12 June 2019. On 17 September 2020, Bashir joined Plateau United ahead of the 2020-21 NPFL season and CAF Champions League campaign.

=== CAF competitions ===
Bashir made his CAF Competitions debut in 2014. On 16 February 2014, Bashir was on the scoresheet for Enyimba in the 2–1 loss to Anges De Notse of Togo in the 2014 CAF Champions League second leg, preliminary tie. The Aba Elephants advanced to the next round with a 4-3 aggregate score line, having won the first leg 3–1 on 9 February 2014.

During the 2017–2018 season, Bashir made 12 appearances for Enyimba in CAF Competitions, scoring twice in their CAF Confederation Cup campaign, which culminated in the home and away semi-final losses to Raja Casablanca. Bashir's goals came in the 3-2 first round second leg win against Energie FC in Aba and in the 2–1 loss in semi-final, second leg.

In the 2019-20 CAF Confederation Cup campaign, Bashir played four games for Enyimba before they crashed out following a 3-1 aggregate loss to AC Horoya in March 2020. In the group stages, Bashir scored as Enyimba thrashed San Pedro of Côte d'Ivoire 5–2 in Abidjan to progress to the quarter-finals where they were eliminated by Horoya.

== Honours ==
Enyimba

- Super 4 (Nigeria): 2013 NPFL Super Four
- Nigeria Professional Football League: 2014–15, 2018–19
