= Showemimo =

Showemimo is a Nigerian surname that may refer to the following notable people:

- Abdulwasiu Showemimo (born 1988), Nigerian football defender
- Adeola Ogunmola Showemimo, Nigerian aircraft pilot
- Gift Showemimo (born 1974), Nigerian football player
