= Abdullahi Musa =

Nigerian footballer

Personal information
- Full name: Abdullahi Tayo Musa
- Date of birth: 1 February 1996 (age 30)
- Place of birth: Kano, Nigeria
- Height: 1.72 m (5 ft 8 in)
- Position: Defender

Team information
- Current team: Kano Pillars

Senior career*
Years	Team	Apps	(Gls)
2014	Ramcy Kano		
2015–2019	Wikki Tourists		
2019–	Kano Pillars		

International career^{‡}
2018–	Nigeria	1	(0)
- * Club domestic league appearances and goals as of 11:47, 28 September 2020 (UTC) ‡ National team caps and goals as of 11:47, 28 September 2020 (UTC)

Abdullahi Tayo Musa (born 1 February 1996) is a Nigerian international footballer who plays for Kano Pillars, as a defender.

== Career ==
Born in Kano, he has played club football for Ramcy Kano, Wikki Tourists and Kano Pillars.

He made his international debut for Nigeria in 2018.
