= Ubong Essien =

Nigerian footballer

Personal information
- Full name: Ubong Effiong Essien
- Date of birth: 17 December 2001 (age 24)
- Place of birth: Kano
- Height: 1.68 m (5 ft 6 in)
- Position: Midfielder

Team information
- Current team: Akwa United
- Number: 27

Senior career*
Years	Team	Apps	(Gls)
2018 -	Akwa United	75	(0)
- * Club domestic league appearances and goals as of 23 July 2022

Ubong Essien (born 17 December 2001) is a Nigerian footballer who plays as a midfielder for Nigeria Professional Football League club Akwa United.

== Club career ==
Essien began his professional career in 2018, when he joined Akwa United from Kano-based Welcome Time Soccer Academy. He signed for the Uyo club on 1 January 2018, but was unveiled on 7 January 2018. Essien made his Nigeria Professional Football League debut for the club in the 2–1 win over Enyimba on 30 May 2018.
