= Chinedu Udoji =

Nigerian footballer

Personal information
- Date of birth: 22 December 1989
- Date of death: 18 February 2018 (aged 28)
- Position: Midfielder

Senior career*
Years	Team	Apps	(Gls)
2010–2017	Enyimba		
2017–2018	Kano Pillars		
- * Club domestic league appearances and goals

Chinedu Udoji (22 December 1989 – 18 February 2018) was a Nigerian professional footballer who played for Enyimba and Kano Pillars, as a midfielder. He died in a car crash on 18 February 2018, aged 28.
