= Jasper United F.C. =

Nigerian football club in Onitsha

Jasper United
- Full name: Jasper United

Jasper United were a Nigerian football club based in the city of Onitsha. Founded by Jude Ezechukwu in July 1991 under the name Premier Breweries FC, they were founding members of the Professional League second division. After changing the name to "Jasper United" in 1994, the team won promotion to the First Division in 1995. Their next two seasons were the best in team history. The placed second in both 1996 and 1997, missing the title by goal difference and a single point. Both times they qualified for the CAF Cup the next year, reaching the semis in 1997.

That was the highlight of the team as they slowly slid down the table the next few years. In 2001, they were banished to Minna after crowd violence against rival Enyimba F.C. Eventually, Jasper finished 15th out of 16 teams, but won a relegation playoff with second-division Bendel United to stay up. They were however relegated the next season after finishing 18th, and disbanded after one season in the Professional Division One.

Their seven-year record in the highest level was 94 wins, 44 draws and 91 losses.

== Performance in CAF competitions ==
- CAF Cup:

1997: Semifinals
1998: Second Round

== Former coaches ==
- Ivo Sajh
