= Junior Lokosa =

Nigerian footballer

Personal information
- Full name: Junior Sewanu Lokosa
- Date of birth: 23 August 1993 (age 33)
- Place of birth: Badagry, Nigeria
- Position: Centre-forward

Team information
- Current team: Sporting Lagos F.C
- Number: 18

Senior career*
Years	Team	Apps	(Gls)
2013–2018	First Bank	128	(92)
2018–2019	Kano Pillars	35	(26)
2019–2020	ES Tunis	11	(6)
2021	Simba Sports Club		
2021–2022	Kwara United F.C.		
2022–2023	Al-Rayyan		
2023–	Sporting Lagos F.C		

International career^{‡}
2018–	Nigeria	1	(0)
- * Club domestic league appearances and goals as of 15:04, 15 January 2019 (UTC) ‡ National team caps and goals as of 15:04, 15 January 2019 (UTC)

Junior Sewanu Lokosa (born 23 August 1993) is a Nigerian footballer who plays for Sporting Lagos F.C

== Career ==
Lokosa played for First Bank before moving to Kano Pillars in May 2017. He scored five goals in 14 league games up to the end of the 2017 season.

By the midway point of the 2018 season, Lokosa had scored 14 goal in 15 matches. In May 2018, he went on trial with Bulgarian club Ludogorets, and he also had a trial at Norwegian club Brann. At the end of the season, he received the Eunisell Boot Award after his 19 goals placed him top of the NPFL scoring charts, earning him N3.8million (N200,000 for each goal).

After trials in China, he joined Espérance Sportive de Tunis on 14 January 2019, signing a two-and-a-half-year contract. On July 30, 2020, the Tunisian champions Espérance Sportive de Tunis announced Lokosa's departure on their Official Twitter and cut his contract.

On 5 August 2022, Lokosa joined Saudi Second Division side Al-Rayyan.

== International career ==
Lokosa made his international debut for Nigeria on 28 May 2018 in a friendly against DR Congo. After his impressive form with Kano Pillars, Lokosa was named in the 30-man provisional squad for the 2018 FIFA World Cup in Russia. However, he did not make the final 23.

== Career statistics ==
=== Club ===
As of 8 November 2018

Club performance			League		Cup		Continental		Other		Total	
Club	League	Season	Apps	Goals	Apps	Goals	Apps	Goals	Apps	Goals	Apps	Goals
Kano Pillars	Nigerian League	2017	14	5	0	0	–		–		14	5
Kano Pillars	Nigerian League	2018	21	19	0	0	–		–		21	19
Career statistics			35	23	0	0	0	0	0	0	35	23

=== International ===
As of match played 28 May 2018.

Nigeria
Year	Apps	Goals
2018	1	0
Total	1	0
