= 2018 Nigeria Professional Football League =

Nigeria Professional Football League
- Matches: 60
- Goals: 110 (1.83 per match)
- Top goalscorer: Junior Lokosa (19 goals)
- Biggest away win: Niger Tornadoes 2-0 at Kwara United, 13 January

The 2018 Nigeria Professional Football League was the 47th season of the Nigeria Premier League, the top Nigerian professional league for association football clubs, since its establishment in 1972, and the 28th since the rebranding of the league as the "Professional League". Plateau United won the 2017 season, their first ever title, which came in their second season after being promoted to the top flight.

The season started on 13 January 2018.

== Clubs ==
A total of 20 teams contested the league including 16 teams from the previous season and four teams promoted from the Nigeria National League.

Locations of the Nigeria Professional Football League 2018 teams

== League table ==
Pos	Team	Pld	W	D	L	GF	GA	GD	Pts
1	Lobi Stars F.C.	24	13	4	7	25	16	+9	43
2	Akwa United F.C.	24	12	5	7	27	17	+10	41
3	Kano Pillars F.C.	24	9	11	4	30	17	+13	38
4	Enyimba F.C.	24	9	11	4	23	16	+7	38
5	Plateau United F.C.	24	11	4	9	27	20	+7	37
6	Niger Tornadoes F.C.	24	11	4	9	21	23	−2	37
7	Katsina United F.C.	24	11	3	10	28	22	+6	36
8	Abia Warriors F.C.	24	8	10	6	20	16	+4	34
9	Rivers United F.C.	24	9	7	8	22	22	0	34
10	Enugu Rangers International F.C.	24	8	9	7	19	15	+4	33
11	MFM F.C.	24	10	3	11	22	24	−2	30 (Note: 3 points deducted)
12	Nasarawa United F.C.	24	9	2	13	26	29	−3	29
13	El-Kanemi Warriors F.C.	24	8	5	11	17	21	−4	29
14	Wikki Tourists F.C.	24	8	5	11	21	26	−5	29
15	Kwara United F.C.	24	7	8	9	21	28	−7	29
16	Go Round F.C.	24	8	5	11	16	23	−7	29
17	Ifeanyi Ubah F.C.	24	7	7	10	23	26	−3	28
18	Sunshine Stars F.C.	24	8	7	9	22	27	−5	28
19	Yobe Desert Stars F.C.	24	8	4	12	20	30	−10	28
20	Heartland F.C.	24	5	8	11	15	27	−12	20

Notes:

The league was suspended after 24 rounds due to administrative problems. On 31 August 2018, the Nigeria Professional Football League announced the season was deemed concluded. No champions were awarded and the bottom four teams were not relegated. Lobi Stars, as first place in the league table, were nominated as the Nigerian representatives in the 2018–19 CAF Champions League. Four teams were promoted from the Nigeria National League and 24 teams will compete in the 2018–19 Nigeria Professional Football League season.

== Season statistics ==
=== Goals ===
==== Top scorers ====
Junior Lokosa 19 goals
