= Christian Madu =

Nigerian footballer

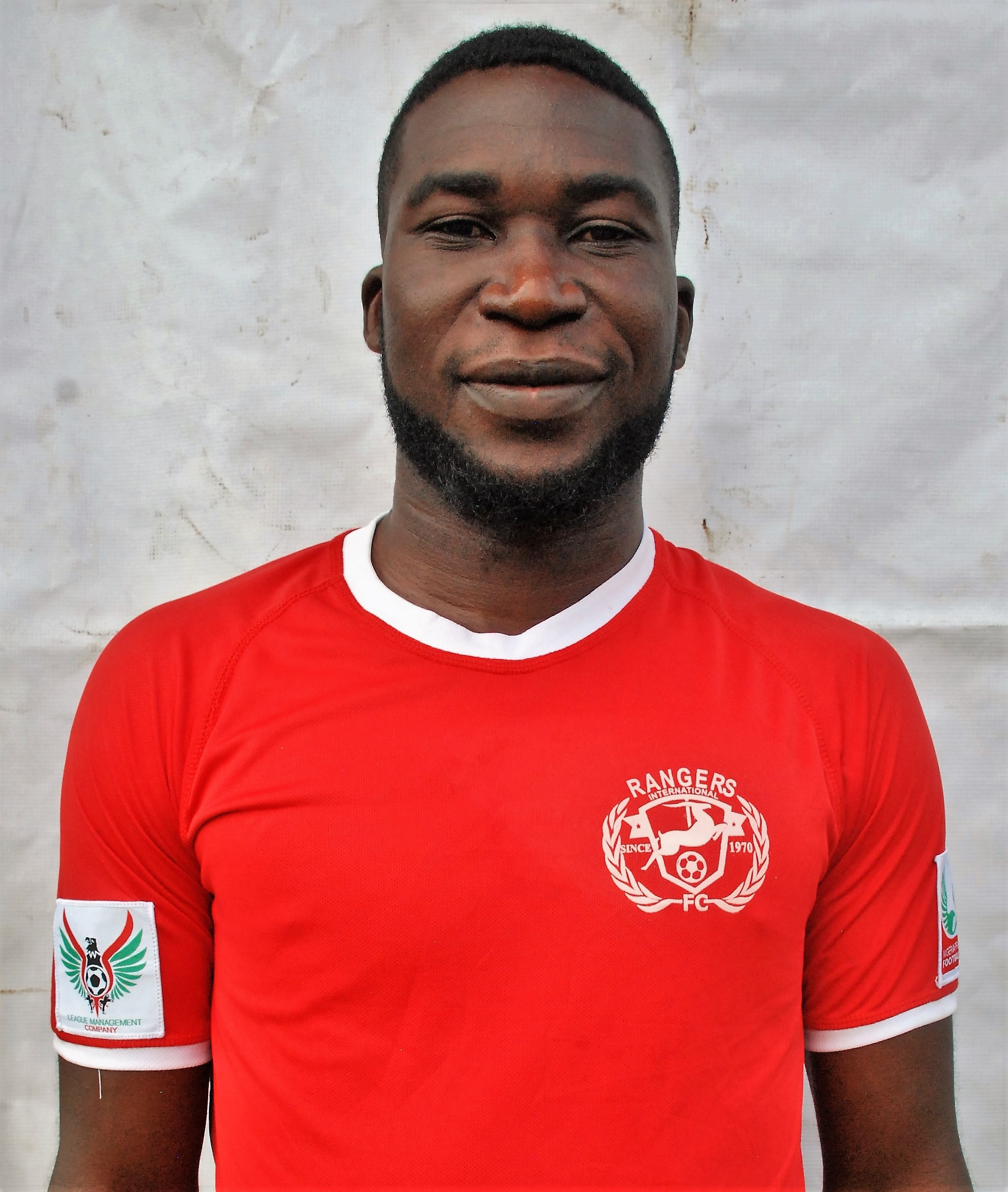

Personal information
- Full name: Christian Obumeneme Madu
- Date of birth: 9 July 1993 (age 33)
- Place of birth: Nigeria
- Height: 1.85 m (6 ft 1 in)
- Position: Midfielder

Team information
- Current team: Lobi Stars
- Number: 21

Senior career*
Years	Team	Apps	(Gls)
2014–2018	Enugu Rangers	98	(4)
2018–2019	Nacional	0	(0)
2019–2022	Enugu Rangers	36	(1)
2022–	Lobi Stars	53	(0)
- * Club domestic league appearances and goals as of 11:55, 20 July 2025 (UTC)

Christian Obumeneme Madu (born 9 July 1993) is a Nigerian professional footballer who plays as midfielder for Lobi Stars.

== Early life and career ==
Christian was born in Udi Local Government Area of Enugu State on 9 July 1993. He grew up in Oji River temporarily where he lived with his parents before relocating to Abuja. While he was in Oji River he attended Federal Co-operative College and graduated with an OND in 2012. Christian began his football career during his childhood days, after finishing from college in 2012 he started playing football full-time. In 2014, he signed a four-year contract with Enugu Rangers and started playing professional football and won Enugu Ranger player of the month in the 2015-16 season. In 2017, while still playing for the Enugu Rangers Christian was absent from matches and trainings for several weeks without official notification to the team and following his absence the management of Enugu Rangers issued a statement that Christian had gone "AWOL". During that period they were rumors he had signed another team.

In August 2018, Christian's contract with Enugu Rangers expired and he signed a new contract with Portuguese team CD Nacional. His new contract with CD Nacional is a four-year deal. Madu left the club by mutual consent on 10 January 2019.
