= Mika Lönnström =

Finnish football coach (born 1974)

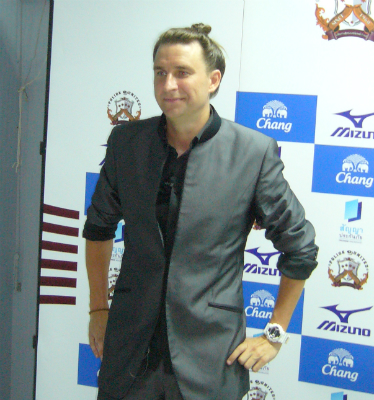
- Lönnström in a press conference with Police United FC in 2014

Personal information
- Full name: Mika Lönnström
- Date of birth: 27 May 1974 (age 52)
- Place of birth: Porvoo, Finland

Team information
- Current team: Lobi Stars (manager)

Managerial career
- Years: Team
- 2002: HyPS (Assistant)
- 2003: Futura
- 2004: MPS (Women)
- 2005–2011: MYPA
- 2011–2012: Roi Et United (Academy)
- 2012–2014: Roi Et United
- 2014: Thailand U16 (assistant)
- 2014: Police United
- 2014–2015: New Radiant
- 2015: Saraburi
- 2015: Maji Maji
- 2017–2018: ŠTK Šamorín
- 2018–2022: HIFK (sporting director)
- 2022–2023: Al-Bukiryah (assistant)
- 2024–: Lobi Stars

Mika Lönnström (born 24 May 1974 in Porvoo) is a Finnish football coach and sporting director, currently managing Lobi Stars in Nigeria Premier Football League.

== Career ==
=== Finland ===
Lönnström started his coaching career at the age of 16 at FC Futura in Finland. After completing his UEFA A Licence (Welsh FA) qualification in 1998 he began working as a coach and director of coaching for several clubs.

After many successful years as a coach and Technical director of Finnish Veikkausliiga team MYPA and after finalising a Degree of Football Management from Finnish FA he was appointed by Gnistan as a club executive director and head of operations.

=== United States ===
In 2007 Lönnström took an educational break to work with Elite Football Camps for youth players in the United States where he became a staff member of University of Kentucky football program. In 2008, he joined the coaching staff of U.S. Soccer in the Olympic Development Program Camps and University of Minnesota's Gopher Soccer Camps. Lönnström also made educational visits with MLS clubs like Columbus Crew and Chicago Fire

=== Thailand ===
In May 2012 Lönnström was appointed Academy Director and first team Assistant Coach of Roi Et United FC of Thailand. He then became Head Coach of the first team the following year.

In his first season in charge he managed to get Roi Et United FC promoted to Thai Division 1 League. In 2013, he was also appointed as Assistant Coach of the Thailand U16 National Team on a part-time basis.

In April 2014 Roi Et United FC mutually terminated his contract to allow him to become Head Coach of Police United FC of the Thailand Premier League. As a result, he became the first ever Finnish head coach to manage in a top flight division of Southeast Asian football.

Before Lönnström took charge of Police United FC at the start of May, the team were languishing 17th in the Thailand Premier League with seven points from nine matches. Under his management they picked up 16 points from nine matches before him and his coaching staff resigned in June under controversial circumstances.

=== Maldives ===
In August 2014 Lönnström was appointed Head Coach of Maldives' most successful football club New Radiant SC. The club went on a long unbeaten streak under him and secured the Dhivehi League title and also President's Cup.

After winning the double in Maldives, Lönnström was awarded the Coach of the Year award in February 2015 at Haveeru Sports Awards.

The Maldivian league champions qualified for the AFC Cup and Lönnström became the first ever Finnish and Nordic football coach to manage a club in this competition. New Radiant SC started their new season with an away match in AFC Cup against Persib Bandung of the (Indonesia Super League). The match was played in front of a full capacity crowd of 30,000 in March 2015. New Radiant SC were beaten 4–1 and as a result, Lönnström and the club mutually terminated his contract a few days later.

After his spell in the Maldives, Lönnström took charge of Thai Premier League side Saraburi FC in April 2015. The newly promoted team were struggling to adapt to the Thailand top flight and were bottom of the table when Lönnström took over. However, after just five league matches at the club, Lönnström resigned in June.

=== Tanzania ===
In July 2015 Lönnström was appointed as a Head Coach of Tanzanian Premier League side Maji Maji FC. The club from Songea gained promotion the previous season and were determined to stay in the top flight by bringing in international coaching.

Lönnström's side made a bright start to the season by winning their first two matches 1–0. By the December mid-season break, the club had collected 11 points from ten matches and were sitting comfortably mid-table. But following difficulties off the pitch Lönnström resigned with immediate effect.

After leaving Maji Maji FC, he focused on projects with his coaching group, The MnM coaching, which is a professional and international coaching group that aims to develop football coaching around the world.

=== Slovakia ===
In December 2016 Lönnström became Head Coach of FC ŠTK 1914 Šamorín in the Slovak 2. Liga in the middle of the season. The club have a partnership with one of Brazil's biggest football clubs, Fluminense FC. Lönnström guided his side into the Promotion Group play-offs by winning three of their first four matches. By the end of the season they had won 10 of their 16 league matches since Lönnström took over to finish fourth in the table and just six points from the top.

=== Finland ===
Lönnström left FC ŠTK 1914 Šamorín in February 2018 before joining HIFK Fotboll as Director of Sport in Finland's Ykkönen. During his first season at the club, HIFK won promotion back to Veikkausliiga at the first attempt. Since then, Lönnström has helped the club finish 7th in 2019 and 8th in 2020.

=== Saudi Arabia ===
He left HIFK in 2022 and joined third-tier Saudi club Al-Bukiryah as an assistant to Glenn Ståhl. While Lonnstrom was in the Middle East, he served on the team’s coaching staff during the preseason and at the start of the season. During this time, the team did not lose a single game. By mutual agreement between the club management and Lonnstrom, his coaching contract was terminated because, upon returning to Finland, Lonnstrom began working in football and leisure consulting and development roles at ExMoVe Ltd. Initially, Lonnstrom served as a Football Specialist at the company and later as acting CEO. An important part of the work involved training management at football clubs and improving coaching and player development.

=== Nigeria ===
On 5 November 2024, Lönnström was named the head coach of Lobi Stars in the Nigeria Premier Football League (NPFL). Lonnstrom served as head coach under Nigerian football legend Daniel Amokachi. Their collaboration was extremely fruitful and successful, but by mutual decision, they stepped down from the club’s leadership in early 2025. The team’s success exceeded expectations, but financial challenges, among other factors, led to a situation where Amokachi and Lonnstrom decided to step down. At the end of the season, the club was relegated from Nigeria’s top division.

Finland, October 2025

Mika Lonnstrom was appointed Sporting Director of Hercules, a club competing in the Finnish Second Division. Before joining Hercules, he worked as a football consultant through MNM Coaching, providing consulting services primarily in Northern Europe and Africa.

As Sporting Director, Lonnstrom was responsible for supporting the club’s long-term sporting strategy, which focused on identifying and developing talented players from northern Finland and creating opportunities for them to advance to higher levels of professional football, including transfers to clubs in more competitive European leagues.

== Managerial statistics ==
As of 3 February 2025

| Team | Nat | From | To | Record | | | | |
| Team | Nat | From | To | G | W | D | L | Win % |
|---|---|---|---|---|---|---|---|---|
| Police United | (Thailand) | 1 April 2014 | 1 August 2014 | 10 | 5 | 1 | 4 | 50.00 |
| Saraburi | (Thailand) | 25 April 2015 | 22 June 2015 | 4 | 0 | 1 | 3 | 0.00 |
| ŠTK Šamorín | (Slovakia) | 10 January 2017 | 3 March 2018 | 34 | 15 | 6 | 13 | 44.12 |
| Lobi Stars | (Nigeria) | 5 November 2024 | present | 10 | 2 | 3 | 5 | 20.00 |
| Total | | | | 58 | 22 | 11 | 25 | 37.93 |

== Honours ==
Manager

Roi Et United

- Thai Regional League Division 2 Winner: 2013
- Regional League North-East Division Winner: 2012, 2013

New Radiant SC

- Dhivehi League Title 2014
- President's Cup 2014

Individual awards:

- Coach of the month in Thai Premier League 2014
- Coach of the Year 2014 in Maldives
