= John Ene Okon =

Nigerian footballer

Personal information
- Date of birth: 15 March 1969
- Date of death: 15 March 2016 (aged 47)
- Place of death: Calabar, Nigeria
- Position: Midfielder

Senior career*
Years	Team	Apps	(Gls)
- Acada United F.C.
- Calabar Rovers
- BCC Lions
- Akwa United

International career
1987	Nigeria U-20		
1992	Nigeria		

Managerial career
- –2016: Calabar Rovers
- * Club domestic league appearances and goals

John Ene Effe Okon (15 March 1969 – 15 March 2016) was a Nigerian football player.

== International career ==
He was part of Nigeria's squad in the 1987 FIFA World Youth Championship and the African Nations Cup that finished third in 1992 Africa Cup of Nations.

== Personal life ==
=== Death ===
Okon died after a short illness in March 2016. He was Calabar Rovers' coach at the time.

Until his death, he was also coach of Eastside Sports Club, a Calabar-based social and non professional group which seeks to establish and improve relationships among young professionals from various walks of life through sport.
