= Godfrey Oboabona =

Nigerian footballer (born 1990)

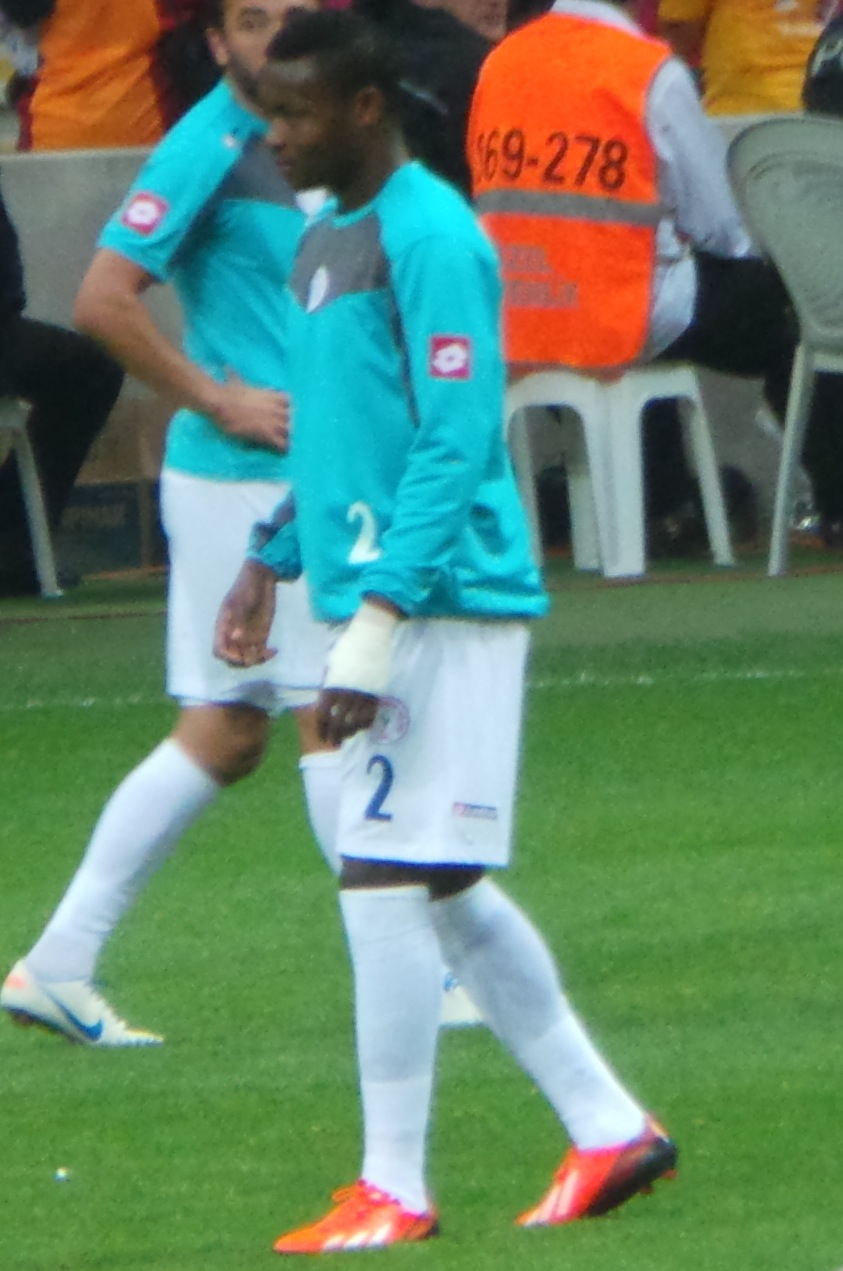
- Obabona with Çaykur Rizespor in 2013

Personal information
- Full name: Godfrey Itama Oboabona
- Date of birth: 16 August 1990 (age 36)
- Place of birth: Ondo, Nigeria
- Height: 1.86 m (6 ft 1 in)
- Position: Centre-back

Youth career
- 2006–2010: Rising Stars

Senior career*
Years	Team	Apps	(Gls)
2010–2013	Sunshine Stars		
2013–2017	Çaykur Rizespor	96	(5)
2017–2018	Al-Ahli	9	(0)
2018–2019	Gorica	14	(0)
2020	FC Dinamo Batumi	11	(2)

International career
2012–2016	Nigeria	39	(1)
Medal record
Men's football
Representing Nigeria
Africa Cup of Nations
Winner	2013 South Africa
- * Club domestic league appearances and goals

Godfrey Itama Oboabona MON (born 16 August 1990) is a Nigerian former professional footballer who played as a centre-back.

== Club career ==
Oboabona was born in Ondo City, and began his professional career with local club Sunshine Stars In August 2013, the BBC claimed there was speculation linking him with a move to English side Arsenal, a claim denied by both Oboabona and Sunshine Stars chairman Mike Odoko.

Later that month, he signed a four-year contract with Turkish club Çaykur Rizespor. He described the transfer as a "dream move." In September 2018, Oboabona joined HNK Gorica in the Croatian First Football League.

In February 2020 he signed for Georgian club FC Dinamo Batumi.

== International career ==
Oboabona made his international debut for Nigeria in 2012, and has appeared in FIFA World Cup qualifying matches. He was called up to Nigeria's 23-man squad for the 2013 Africa Cup of Nations.

He was selected for Nigeria's squad at the 2013 FIFA Confederations Cup, and the 2014 FIFA World Cup. Oboabona was selected by Nigeria for their 35-man provisional squad for the 2016 Summer Olympics.

== Honours ==
Orders

- Member of the Order of the Niger
