= Godwin Koko Uwua =

Nigerian football coach

Personal information
- Full name: Godwin Koko Uwua

Managerial career
- Years: Team
- Lobi Stars F. C.
- Enyimba F. C.
- Niger Tornadoes F. C.
- Bendel Insurance F. C.
- U-20 Flying Eagles

Godwin Koko Uwua is a Nigerian football coach. He has a UEFA B Licence.

In 1999, he led Lobi Stars F.C. of Makurdi, North-Central Nigeria, to win the maiden edition of the Nigerian Super League. He also led Enyimba F.C. of Aba, South-East Nigeria, to their first Nigerian League title in the 2001 season, as well as winning the Nigerian Super Cup in October 2001 with Enyimba F.C. by beating Dolphins F.C. (Port Harcourt) 2–0 in Maiduguri, North-East Nigeria.

In April 2003, Uwua was dismissed with just six months to the start of the All-Africa Games. Nigeria's Football Association said the under-23 coach was sacked for picking up employment with a domestic club while under contract with the national team.

In May 2005, he left Bendel Insurance F.C. of Benin City, South-South Nigeria, after he was beaten up by angry fans. The attack came following his team's 3-0 loss at home to Enyimba F.C.

In April 2013, he resigned his appointment as coach of Niger Tornadoes F.C. of Minna, North-West, Nigeria.

In 2016, he was one of five coaches nominated by the Nigeria Football Federation (NFF) to attend a three-week coaching course in Cologne, Germany. Uwua is a former assistant coach of the Super Eagles of Nigeria to the 2002 FIFA World Cup.

In September 2020, he said one of the biggest disappointments in his coaching career was when he coached Nigeria’s National Team. Uwua coached both the U-20 and U-23 Flying Eagles, at various times.

In October 2020, Uwua said he was ready to return to football but will not beg to get a coaching job. The former Niger Tornadoes F.C. manager said he was enjoying his break from the sport but would consider a return with the right offer. Uwua’s last coaching stint was with Lobi Stars F.C. of Makurdi, after resigning his appointment in 2017 due to a fall-out with the club management.

In January 2021, Uwua was appointed by the Benue State Governor, Samuel Ortom, as his Principal Special Assistant on Urban Development.
