= Theophilus Afelokhai =

Nigerian football player

Personal information
- Full name: Joel Theophilus Afelokhai
- Date of birth: 7 April 1988 (age 38)
- Position: Goalkeeper

Team information
- Current team: Rivers United

Senior career*
| Years | Team | Apps | (Gls) |
| 2015 | Kano Pillars | | |
| 2015–20 | Enyimba | | |
| 2020– | Rivers United | | |
- * Club domestic league appearances and goals

Joel Theophilus Afelokhai (born 7 April 1988) is a Nigerian professional football goalkeeper for Rivers United of the Nigeria Professional Football League (NPFL). Before playing for Rivers United, Afelokhai played for Kano Pillars and Enyimba.

== Club career ==
Afelokhai joined Rivers United from Enyimba in 2020. He became the highest paid footballer in the Nigeria Professional Football League.

In the 2021–2022 NPFL title, he won his 7th Nigerian League title as a player with Rivers United. Afelokhai has also represented his clubs in African continental competitions including both the CAF Champions League, and the CAF Confederation Cup.

== International career ==
Afelokhai received his first call up to the Nigerian national football team in 2018 after an injury ruled out first choice Francis Uzoho. He was part of the Nigeria squad for the 2018 African Nations Championship, but was on the bench as they lost 4-0 in the final to Morocco at the Stade Mohammed V in Casablanca.

== Honours ==
Winner

Kano Pillars

- NPFL: 2011–2012, 2012–2013, 2013–2014

Enyimba F.C.

- NPFL: 2019

Rivers United

- NPFL: 2021–2022
