= Maurice Cooreman =

Belgian football manager (1943–2022)

Personal information
- Date of birth: 1943
- Place of birth: Belgium
- Date of death: 31 May 2022 (aged 79)
- Place of death: Belgium

Managerial career
- Years: Team
- Bendel Insurance
- Lobi Stars
- Gabros International
- 2005: NPA
- 2006: Ocean Boys
- 2006–2008: Enyimba
- 2008–2009: Asante Kotoko
- 2009–2012: Kaduna United
- 2012: Warri Wolves
- 2012–2014: Gombe United
- 2015: Ikorodu United
- 2016: Akwa United
- 2017: Ikorodu United

Maurice Cooreman (1943 – 31 May 2022) was a Belgian football manager who coached primarily in Africa.

== Career ==
Cooreman led Ocean Boys to the title in 2006, but was sacked in September 2006 and then rehired two weeks later. He managed Enyimba from October 2006 to November 2008, and received a five match ban in April 2008 after attacking a referee. He was appointed manager of Ghanaian side Asante Kotoko in November 2008, but was sacked in February 2009.

Cooreman also managed NPA, Bendel Insurance, Lobi Stars and Gabros International. He was hired in August 2009 to coach Kaduna United FC.

On 30 August 2010, Cooreman, who led Kaduna United to a historic Federation Cup glory for the first time for the state, decided to extend his stay with the team for another year.

On 20 February 2012, Cooreman was named as the new head coach of Warri Wolves. He signed a one-year contract with Gombe United in October 2012. He resigned for health in 2014. He was hired in March 2015 as coach of second-division Ikorodu United.

After helping Ikorodu win promotion, he signed for Akwa United ahead of the 2016 season for a chance to coach again in continental football. He returned to Ikorodu in January 2017 after being sacked by Akwa.

== Personal life ==
He had three children, including sons Davy and Steve who are professional footballers in Belgium. He was married to a Nigerian woman.

Cooreman died in Belgium on 31 May 2022 at the age of 79.
