= Akwa United F.C. =

Nigerian football club

Akwa United
- Full name: Akwa United Football Club of Uyo
- Nickname: The Promise Keepers
- Founded: 1996; 30 years ago
- Ground: Godswill Akpabio International Stadium
- Capacity: 30,000
- Owner: Akwa Ibom State Government
- Chairman: Joseph Eno
- Manager: Paul Offor
- League: Nigeria National League
- 2025–26: Nigeria National League, 2nd of 10 (Conference B)
| Home colours | Away colours |

Akwa United Football Club is a Nigerian football club based in Uyo, Akwa Ibom. They play in the Nigeria National League, the second division of Nigerian football. The Godswill Akpabio International Stadium is the club's home Stadium. In the 2020/21 season they were crowned champions of the league for the first time in their history.

== History ==
Starting out as "Ibom Stars Football Club", the club began its professional campaign in the 1996/97 season of the second-tier NNL (then called the "Pro League"). Assam Assam was the pioneer chairman of the club with coach Bernard Ogbe serving as its first technical adviser. The club played its home matches at the Uyo Township Stadium, wearing red & white as its respective home and away kits. It was a dominant force in the state, winning the state Challenge Cup seven times between 1996 and 2006.

=== Promotion & Rebrand ===
After playing in the second division for almost ten years, Ibom Stars gained promotion to the Nigeria Premier League (now called the Nigeria Professional Football League) in the 2007/08 season, thrashing neighbours Calabar Rovers 13–0 at Oron Township Stadium on the last day of the season to edge Bussdor FC and qualify.

The management of the club then applied for a change of name, changing from "Ibom Stars FC" to "Akwa United FC" with the nickname The Promise Keepers. They would also adopt blue for their home matches and white for their away matches.

The team attracted many big names from other clubs around the country. The then-chairman Chris Ekong signed coach Charles Bassey (MON) to take charge of the team, assisted by Emmanuel King. What followed was arrival of some household names, including Innocent Ozurumba, Ottanwa Ottanwa, Abdul Haruna, Stanley Amadi, and even former national U17 players Ambrose Vanzekin, Kingsley Udo and King Osanga. The newly recruited players teamed up with some indigenous stars to build what was one of the best squads in the country that year.

=== First Top-flight Season ===
Akwa United played her first Premier League match against El-kanemi Warriors of Maiduguri at the Oron Township Stadium, winning 1–0. Midfielder Emmanuel Ekpo was the scorer. Their 0–1 victory over Nasarawa United in Lafia would be the team's first away win in the Premier league. Akwa United's first season in the Premier League was not, however, without friction. In a league match against Enyimba International, the club was hit with a heavy fine and banished from Uyo Township Stadium for three years after home fans furiously invaded the pitch in response to referee Felicia Okugbe awarding a controversial injury time penalty, with one person believed dead and many others sustaining various injuries. The aftermath of this would have a psychological effect on the team's performance, as they struggled through the rest of the season. In what was a turbulent first season for the club, they finished 14th with 48 points after recording 14 victories, 6 draws and 18 defeats.

=== 2008-2009 Season- One season, three Coaches and relegation ===
The Promise Keepers second season in the Premier League was not as smooth as the first.

Coach ImeUko was appointed by the club's management to take charge of the team and he was assisted by Coach Godwin Morgan. The team faced many challenges in the 2008/2009 season as some of her top players left the team for greener pastures. What followed was poor form and results. The team was struggling in the relegation zone for most of the season.

In a bid to salvage the situation, Coach Godwin Uwah was contracted to save the team from the drop. Coach Uwah battled tooth and nail to get results but to no avail. He later resigned his appointment.

The management in a desperate attempt to avoid being relegated appointed Coach Patrick Udoh to take charge of the team till the end of the season. Despite a late charge which saw them pick up some interesting results and also produced the league highest goal scorer of the season, (Orok Akarandut 17 goals) the team was dramatically relegated on the last day. They were dramatically relegated on the last day of the season on goals differential following Kaduna United's 9–0 defeat to Zamfara United. Akwa United garnered 48 points from 38 matches including 14 wins, 6 draws and 18 defeats to finish in 17th position.

=== Return to Premier League ===
When Akwa United returned to the lower division in the 2009/2010 season, the management team led by ObongIsongIsang promised that the team would return to the Premier League and kept its words. Akwa United made a return to the Big Time - the Premier League in 2011/2012 season (two years after their relegation from the premier league) and put up an improved performances throughout the season to finish on 50 points from 38 games comprising 15 victories, 5draws and 16 losses finishing in 12th, (the club's highest position ever on the log) under coach Solomon Ogbeide.

=== Last day survival ===
The management brought in two indigenous Coaches, Patrick Udo was the Technical Adviser while Emmanuel King was the Chief Coach both handled the team in 2012/2013 season. They started the campaign on a brighter note and topped the log for five weeks. But a dip in form saw them drop drastically in mid season though they managed to retain their top flight status when they ended the season one place above the relegation zone with 51 points. Their 14 wins, 9 draws and 15 defeats dropped the Promise Keepers to 16th position.

In 2013/2014 season, one of Nigeria's most experienced and widely traveled coaches Justin Tenger was given the nod to take charge of the team. But after a bright start at the beginning of that season, the team's fortune dwindled yet again. For the second straight season, they survived the drop on the last day, finishing in 16th place.

=== New Home Ground ===
The usual trend continued in the 2014/2015 season with the arrival of a new coach in Zackary Baraje. The team played few matches at the old Uyo Township Stadium before the League Management Company (LMC) deemed the stadium unfit to host Nigeria Professional Football League matches.

Akwa United then moved to the magnificent 30,000 capacity Godswill Akpabio International Stadium which was built by former Governor Godswill Akpabio.

Although the story of escaping relegation on the last day was the same ( Akwa United defeated Lobi Stars of Makurdi 1–0, with Afeez Awakan scoring the only goal of the match to help the team stay up). Their 13 wins, 8 draws and 17 defeats pushed them to 15th position, two places above the drop zone.

=== Federation Cup Glory and Continental Debut ===
The 2014/2015 season was to be a standout season for the club for many reasons.

The team made history by winning the Federations Cup in November 2015, beating Lobi Stars of Makurdi 2–1 at the Teslim Balogun Stadium in Lagos to lift their first major trophy and qualified to play in the CAF Confederation Cup. (Then Captain Nnamso Edo and Afeez Awakan were the scorers).

Belgian Coach Maurice Cooreman was then appointed the new manager of the team and he took charge of the team in their first ever outing at the continental level where they were knocked out in the first round by Congolese side Vita Club Mokanda in Uyo. After winning the first leg 1–0 in Congo (UbongEkpai was the scorer) they lost at home by the same margin and were knocked out 4–3 on penalty shootout.

There was however a big improvement in the team's performance in the league as they finished in 14th position.

The team's 14th-place finish without the sweat of relegation worries was well celebrated and it was attributed to the effort of a seasoned journalist turned football administrator Elder Paul Bassey who was appointed Chairman of the Club in mid season of 2015/2016 by the State Governor Mr. Udom Emmanuel.

=== A New Dawn ===
In his first full season in charge of Akwa United as chairman, Elder Paul Bassey restructured the team and brought in a touch of professionalism into the administration of the club which has since manifested positively.

Part of the transformation process was the change in the club's Jersey colour from Blue and White to Orange and White which represents the Akwa Ibom State official colours.

Elder Paul Bassey's lead management contracted one of Nigeria's most experienced and intelligent Coaches Abdu Maikaba to take charge of the team.

Coach Maikaba recruited players such as Alhassan Ibrahim, Moses Ebiye, Aremu Afeez, IfeanyiIfeanyi, Musa Newman, Christian Pyagbara and Emmanuel Iwu and blended them with some star players like Ubong Friday, Otobong Effiong, Godspower Igudia, Ariwachukwu Emmanuel, Cyril Olisema, Chigozie Chilekwu, Ubong Idio, Amaechi Orji etc. that were retained from the previous season.

And despite a slow start to the season which saw the team manage just six points from a possible 18, they picked up and adjusted to the playing pattern of Coach Maikaba.

The result of the blend was evident in Akwa United's performances and achievements in the 2016/2017 NPFL season in which they were seriously contending for the title, but only to miss out in the last four rounds of matches and also missed the chance to pick one of the three continental tickets available through the league format by just a point.

Akwa United finished the 2016/2017 NPFL season in fourth placed (their highest ever finish in the top flight). They recorded 17 victories, 9 draws and 12 defeats with 60 points from 38 matches and also lifted the FA Cup (AITEO Cup) for the second time in 3 years.

The 2016/2017 season was the 20th Anniversary of Akwa United since it was founded as the Ibom Stars in the 1996/1997 season. The team has played in Nigeria's Premier League for eight years in its 20 years of existence. The end of the 2016/2017 season marked the club's sixth consecutive seasons in the league.

=== 2017–18: Uninterrupted seventh season in the topflight ===
The end of the 2017–18 NPFL season marked the club's seven consecutive seasons in the Nigeria top flight since the 2011–12 NPFL.

==== Second appearance on the continent ====
Akwa United made their second appearance on the continent but were stunned 2–1 by Hawks FC of Gambia, in the first leg of the 2018 CAF Confederation Cup preliminary tie played at the Godswill Akpabio International Stadium on Sunday, February 11, 2018.

In the second leg at the Independence Stadium, Bakau on February 21, 2018, Cyril Olisema scored a brace to hand Akwa United a 3–2 aggregate win over the Gambian club and passage to the first round.

Al-Ittihad defeated Akwa United 1–0 in the first round, first leg fixture, only for the Promise Keepers to record the same scoreline in the second leg courtesy of Aniekeme Asuquo's 46th-minute goal, to go level on aggregate, before edging the Libyan club 3–2 on penalties to qualify for the second round.

The Promise Keepers fell 2–0 to Al-Hilal in the second round, first leg, at the Al-Hilal Stadium on Sunday April 8, 2018.

However, their 3–1 win over Al-Hilal in the second round, return leg at the Godswill Akpabio International Stadium on Sunday, April 18, 2018, courtesy of Denis Nya's first half injury-time goal and Michael Ibe's brace in the second half was not enough to take Akwa United to the group stage, as Al-Hilal's Mohammed Bashir 28' minute goal qualified the Sudanese club on away goals rule.

==== Highest position ever on the log ====
The Promise Keepers finished second on the 2017–18 NPFL log with 41 points from 24 matches, two points behind leaders Lobi Stars in July 2018.

==== 2018 Aiteo Cup quarter final Exit ====
The two time FA Cup Champions who were hoping to defend their 2017 Aiteo Cup crown were halted in the quarter final via penalties by Enugu Rangers at the Sani Abacha Stadium, Kano on Wednesday, 3 October 2018.

Michael Ibeh put Akwa United in front with a well-taken freekick in the first half, before Okey Odita drew level for Enugu Rangers, 20 minutes to the end of regulation time.

Enugu Rangers (The Flying Antelopes), however prevailed 4–2 in the penalty shoot-outs.

=== 2018–19: Abridged league ===
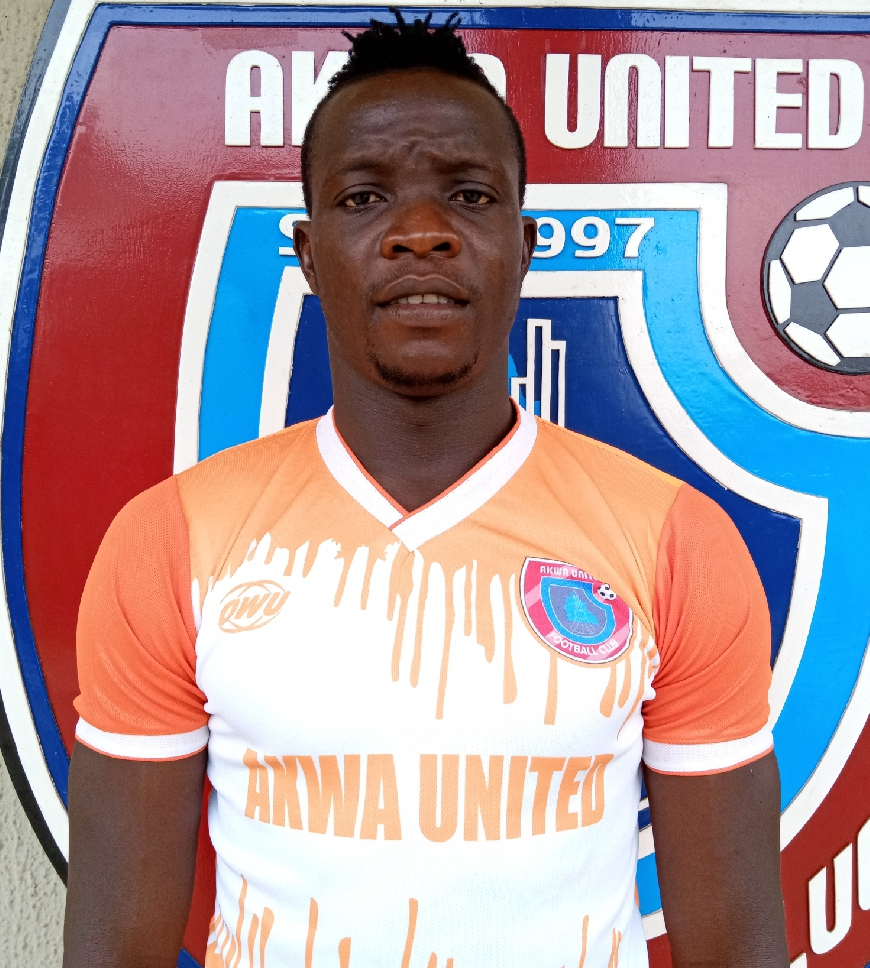
Denis Nya in a shirt of Akwa United

Akwa United management signed former Abia Warriors and FC Ifeanyi Ubah coach, Rafael Everton to lead the team in the abridged 2018–19 NPFL, following the departure of coach Abdullahi Maikaba to Plateau United at the conclusion of the 2017–18 season.

The Brazilian tactician became the third foreigner after Cameroonian Emmanuel Deutsch and Belgian Maurice Cooreman to handle Akwa United in its 22-year-old history.

Twelve new players joined the team, including former player and Enyimba captain, Mfon Udoh, 2013 Super Eagles AFCON winner, Juwon Oshaniwa, and 2016 Federation Cup winner, Alberico Da Silva.

The team lost 1–0 at home to El-Kanemi Warriors on the opening day of the league and followed up with a 1–1 draw at Kano Pillars on matchday three, being their second game of the season, after the matchday two tie against Gombe United was postponed.

They drew 2–2 at home against Plateau United on matchday four and lost 2–0 to Nasarawa United at Lafia Township stadium in a matchday five fixture.

Coach Everton side recorded their first win of the season on matchday six courtesy of a 3–0 home win over new comers, Go Round FC and went on an unbeaten run which culminated in a hard-fought 2–1 victory over Heartland FC of Owerri at the Okigwe Township stadium.

Akwa United ended the first round in second place on the Group B log with 19 points from 11 matches, scoring 17 goals and conceding 10.

=== 2020–21: Nigerian Professional League Champions ===
On August 1, 2021, Akwa United was crowned NPFL Champions for the first time in their existence after a dominating winning display of 5–2 against MFM FC at the Godswill Akpabio stadium, Uyo with a game to spare.

Akwa United also set a league record with their 18-match unbeaten run, surpassing Enyimba in 2005 and Kano Pillars 2019–20 13-match unbeaten sequence.

As at the time of being crowned champions, which occurred during the Match Week 37, they had a total win of 19, 14 draws and 4 losses in a feat unbecoming of a Nigerian football club.

The later lost 2–1 away to Lobi Stars FC in the last Match Day of the season.

== Honours ==
| Type | Competition | Titles | Seasons |
|---|---|---|---|
| Domestic | League/NPFL | 1 | Winners (1): 2020–21 |
| Domestic | FA Cup/Nigeria Federation Cup | 2 | Winners (2): 2015, 2017 |
| Domestic | Super Cup/Nigeria Super Cup | 1 | Winners (1): 2015 |
| Domestic | Super 4 | 1 | Winners (1): 2015 |
| Regional | Akwa Ibom Fa Cup | 18 | Winners (18): 1996 – 2006, 2007 – 2011, 2013, 2014, 2015, 2016, 2018, 2022, 2023, 2024, 2025, 2026 |

- record

== Performances in CAF competitions ==
CAF Champions League

- 2021–22 – First round

CAF Confederation Cup

- 2016 – First round
- 2018 – Third round

== Players ==
=== Current players ===
As of 14 November 2021

Note: Flags indicate national team as defined under FIFA eligibility rules; some limited exceptions apply. Players may hold more than one non-FIFA nationality.

| No. | Pos. | Nation | Player |
|---|---|---|---|
| 1 | GK | NGR | Adewale Adeyinka |
| 18 | GK | CMR | Jean Efala |
| 33 | GK | NGR | Dele Ajiboye |
| 34 | GK | NGR | Ifeanyi Emmanuel |

| No. | Pos. | Nation | Player |
|---|---|---|---|
| 2 | DF | NGR | James Ajako |
| 3 | DF | NGR | Evans Ogbonda |
| 5 | DF | NGR | Sampson Gbadebo |
| 6 | DF | NGR | Charles Okafor |
| 12 | DF | NGR | Denis Nya |
| 14 | DF | NGR | John Lazarus |
| 15 | DF | NGR | Elu Wilson |
| 26 | DF | NGR | Ekene Olisema |
| 29 | DF | NGR | Etboy Akpan |

| No. | Pos. | Nation | Player |
|---|---|---|---|
| 16 | MF | NGR | James Arong |
| 19 | MF | NGR | Seth Mayi |
| 24 | MF | NGR | Samuel Amadi |
| 27 | MF | NGR | Ubong Essien |
| 28 | MF | NGR | Stephen Amos |
| 37 | MF | NGR | Nicholas Godswill |

| No. | Pos. | Nation | Player |
|---|---|---|---|
| 7 | FW | NGR | Ubong Friday |
| 8 | FW | NGR | Ezekiel Bassey |
| 10 | FW | NGR | Orok Akarandut |
| 11 | FW | NGR | Leo Ezekiel |
| 13 | FW | NGR | Aiz Jibrin |
| 17 | FW | NGR | Stephen Chukwude |
| 4 | FW | NGR | Utibe Archibong |
| 23 | FW | NGR | Izu Azuka |
| 25 | FW | NGR | Wisdom Fernando |
| 32 | FW | NGR | Abiodun Thompson |
| 35 | FW | NGR | Tony Obia |

== Staff ==
=== Management staff ===
| Position | Name |
|---|---|
| Chairman | (Nigeria) Joseph Eno |
| General Manager | (Nigeria) Jimmy Joshua |
| Team manager | (Nigeria) Festus Akpan |
| Secretary | (Nigeria) Omon Bassey |
| Accountant | (Nigeria) Mary Akpaidiok |
| Welfare officer | (Nigeria) Asuquo Samuel |
| Media manager | (Nigeria) Mfon Patrick |
| Cashier | (Nigeria) Idara Ekong |
| Camp commandant | (Nigeria) Anietie Christo Davies |

=== Technical staff ===
| Position | Name |
|---|---|
| Assistant coach (Goalkeeper Trainer) | (Nigeria) Bassey Akpan |
| Assistant coach | (Nigeria) Usen Ebuk |
| Assistant coach | (Nigeria) Orok Akarandut |
| Referees coordinator | (Nigeria) Okon Ekanem |
| Scout | (Nigeria) Usoro Imaikop |
| Doctor | (Nigeria) Obot Jackson |
| Nurse | (Nigeria) Emem Edwin |
| Physiotherapist | (Nigeria) Albert Samuel |
| Psychologist | (Nigeria) Ime Uko |
| Kit and Equipment managers | (Nigeria) Aniedi Isaiah (Nigeria) Akaninyene Dickson |

=== Administrative staff ===
| Position | Name |
|---|---|
| Office Manager | (Nigeria) Uwem James |
| Office Secretary | (Nigeria) Emem Udofot |
| Assistant Office Manager | (Nigeria) Ndiana-Abasi James |
| Transport officers | (Nigeria) Edet Okon (Nigeria) Sunny Cosmas (Nigeria) Austine George (Nigeria) Monday Solomon |
| Security officers | (Nigeria) Okon Udo (Nigeria) Edikan Dominic |

== Managerial history ==
Akwa United Head Coaches since 1997–1998 Nigeria football season

| Season | Name | League |
|---|---|---|
| 1997–1998 | (Nigeria) Benard Ogbe | NNL |
| 1998–1999 | (Nigeria) Henry Nwosu | NNL |
| 1999–2000 | (Nigeria) Henry Nwosu | NNL |
| 2000–2001 | (Nigeria) Anietie Ukpa | NNL |
| 2001–2002 | (Nigeria) Anietie Ukpa | NNL |
| 2002–2003 | (Nigeria) Henry Nwosu | NNL |
| 2003–2004 | (Nigeria) Henry Nwosu | NNL |
| 2004–2005 | (Nigeria) Emmanuel King | NNL |
| 2005–2006 | (Nigeria) Charles Bassey | NNL |
| 2006–2007 | (Nigeria) Charles Bassey | NNL |
| 2007–2008 | (Cameroon) Emmanuel Deutsch | NNL |
| 2008–2009 | (Nigeria) Ime Uko | NPFL |
| 2008–2009 | (Nigeria) Godwin Uwua | NPFL |
| 2008–2009 | (Nigeria) Patrick Udoh | NPFL |
| 2009–2010 | (Nigeria) Bernard Ogbe | NNL |
| 2010–2011 | (Nigeria) Solomon Ogbeide | NNL |
| 2011–2012 | (Nigeria) Solomon Ogbeide | 2011–12 NPFL |
| 2012–2013 | (Nigeria) Patrick Udoh | 2012–13 NPFL |
| 2013–2014 | (Nigeria) Justin Tenger | 2013–14 NPFL |
| 2014–2015 | (Nigeria) Zachary Baraje | 2014–15 NPFL |
| 2015–2016 | (Belgium) Maurice Cooreman | 2015–16 NPFL |
| 2016–2017 | (Nigeria) Abdullahi Maikaba | 2016–17 NPFL |
| 2017–2018 | (Nigeria) Abdullahi Maikaba | 2017–18 NPFL |
| 2018–2019 | (Brazil) Rafael Everton | 2018–19 NPFL |
| 2019 – | (Nigeria) John Obuh | 2019–20 NPFL |
| 2019 – | (Nigeria) Kennedy Boboye | 2019–20 NPFL |

- Last updated: 10 February 2020

== Kit information ==
| Period | Kit manufacturer | Shirt sponsor |
|---|---|---|
| 1996–2017 | | None |
| 2017–2022 | Owu Sportswear | None |
| 2022–2024 | Owu Sportswear | 1xBet |
| 2025– | Owu Sportswear | Ibom Air |
