= Abdulwasiu Showemimo =

Nigerian footballer

Wasiu Sowemimo
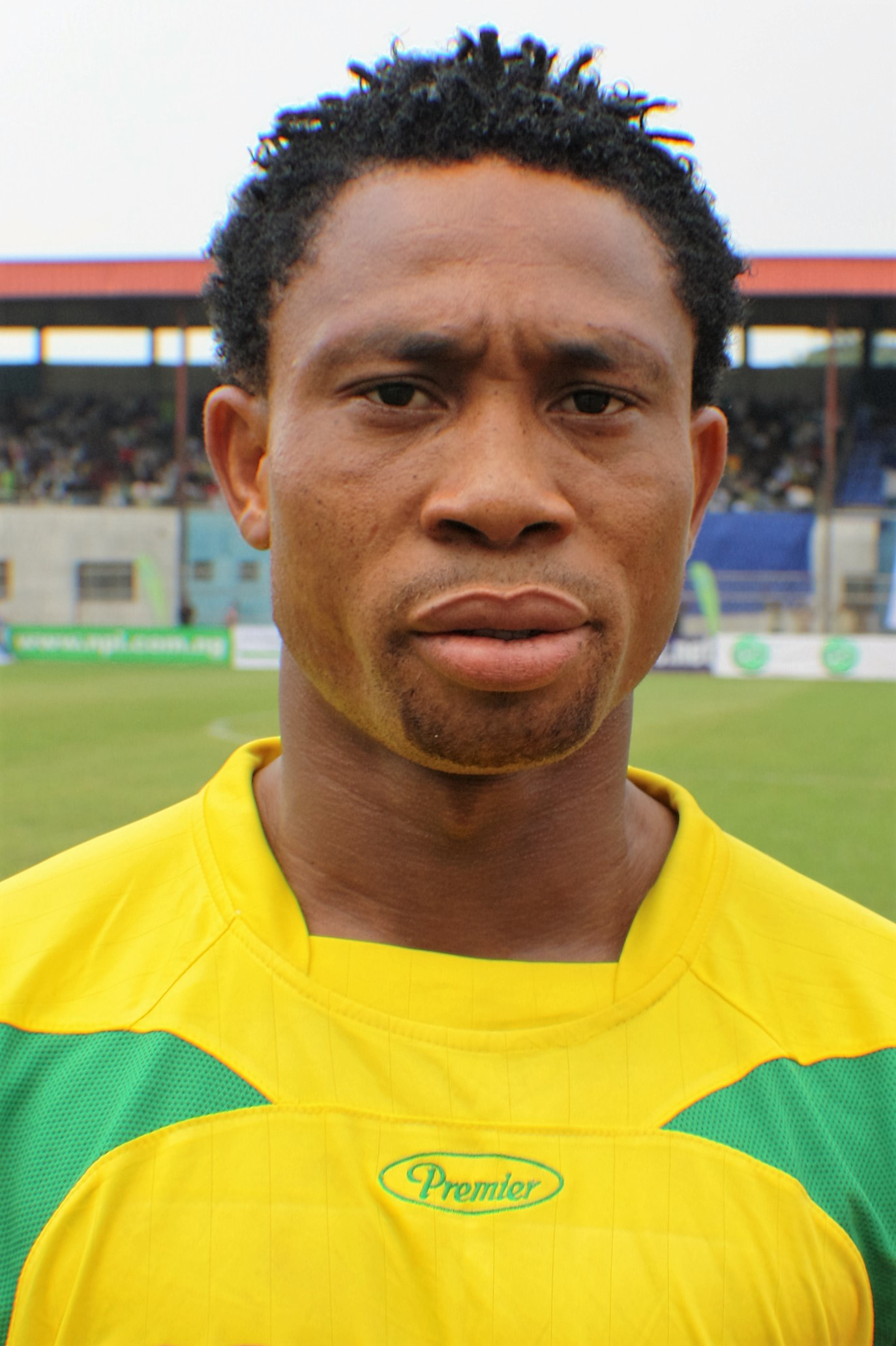
- Kano Pillars 2010, by Nobert Okoli, Enugu

Personal information
- Full name: Abdulwasiu Omotayo Showemimo
- Date of birth: 10 October 1988 (age 38)
- Place of birth: Lagos, Nigeria
- Position: Centre back

Team information
- Current team: Abia Warriors F.C.

Youth career
- 2005: Zamfara United F.C.

Senior career*
Years	Team	Apps	(Gls)
2006–2008	Gateway F.C.	38	
2008–2011	Kano Pillars F.C.		
2012–2013	Dolphins		
2014–	Abia Warriors F.C.		

International career
- Nigeria beach football
2011	Nigeria	1	(0)
- * Club domestic league appearances and goals

Abdulwasiu Omotayo Showemimo (born 10 October 1988, in Lagos) is a Nigerian defender playing for Abia Warriors F.C.

== Career ==
Showemimo began his career 2005 on the youth side for Zamfara United F.C. and signed in the spring 2006 for team Gateway F.C. He played 38 games in two seasons for Gateway and signed in summer 2008 for Kano Pillars F.C. He transferred to Dolphins before the 2012 season. In January 2014 he signed with Premier League newcomers Abia Warriors.

== International career ==
He was called up for the camp prior to November 2010 friendly against Iran, but had to drop out due to an injury. He made his Eagles' debut as a substitute in the February 2011 friendly against Sierra Leone. Showemimo represented previously the Nigeria beach football team in an International tournament in South Africa.
