= 2011 Green Soccer Bowl =

Tournament details
- Host country: United States
- City: Dallas
- Dates: 26–27 February 2011
- Teams: 4 (from 2 confederations)
- Venue: 1 (in 1 host city)

Tournament statistics
- Matches played: 0

The 2011 Green Soccer Bowl (reported by some media outlets as the Obama Cup) was a proposed association football tournament. Previously, the competition had been scheduled to take place in 2010 but the event was cancelled.

The competition's matches were reported to be played at Ford Field, Detroit and Cotton Bowl, Dallas. The two venues are approximately 1,000 miles apart. It had previously been reported that games would be hosted at Pizza Hut Park (erroneously reported as PHP Stadium).

Nigeria Football Federation's media officer Ademola Olajire stated that the competition will be held in honor of U.S. President Barack Obama. The tournament was organized by the U.S. Presidents’ Day Celebration Soccer Invitational Tournament Foundation chaired by former Nigerian international soccer player Pius Oleh, who participated in Nigeria's unsuccessful qualifying campaign for the 1990 World Cup.

Nigerian newspapers have also suggested that Malaysia and Bahrain would participate in the tournament whilst the competition's official tournament says that Lebanon and Mexico would participate.

As of July 24, 2010 the groups have been set as:

Group A

- Nigeria
- Poland
- Malaysia
- Iraq

Group B

- Egypt
- Bosnia and Herzegovina
- Kenya
- Bahrain

On February 18, 2011 it was announced the United States Soccer Federation had finally accredited the tournament. However, due to withdrawals from the paucity of gaining entry visas, the field was reduced to only four teams: Nigeria, Mexico's Under 23 team, Panama, and Costa Rica.

Group A

- Nigeria
- Mexico U-23
- Panama
- Costa Rica

On the eve of the matches, the tournament was cancelled after various organizational problems left every team but Nigeria to withdraw.
