= Hadejia Stadium =

Multi-use stadium in Hadejia, Jigawa State, Nigeria

Coordinates: 12°28′25″N 10°1′53″E

Hadejia Stadium is a multi-use stadium in Hadejia, Jigawa State, Nigeria. It is currently used mostly for football matches and is the home stadium of Jigawa Golden Stars F.C. The stadium has a capacity of 15,000 people.
