= Steve Cooreman =

Belgian footballer

Personal information
- Full name: Steve Cooreman
- Date of birth: 20 December 1976 (age 49)
- Place of birth: Lunner, Belgium
- Height: 1.75 m (5 ft 9 in)
- Position: Defender

Team information
- Current team: Ham-Kam
- Number: 1

Senior career*
Years	Team	Apps	(Gls)
1996–1998	KAA Gent	5	(0)
1998–2000	Eendracht Aalst	43	(7)
2000–2004	Germinal Beerschot	60	(8)
2004–2006	KAA Gent	24	(2)
2006–2008	Ham-Kam	0	(0)
- * Club domestic league appearances and goals as of 21 June 2008 ‡ National team caps and goals as of 21 June 2009

Steve Cooreman (born 28 December 1976) is a Belgian football defender who last played for Hamarkameratene in the Norwegian Tippeliga.

Steve is the son of Maurice Cooreman.
