= Super 4 (Nigeria) =

Sporting event

The Nigeria Super 4 was an annual preseason competition involving teams that will be representing Nigeria in CAF Champions League and CAF Confederations Cup. The teams to participate were normally the winners and runners-up from the FA Cup and Nigerian Premier League, although age-grade national teams have also competed once in the past. Four teams usually compete, hence the name "Super 4".

== Finals ==
Year	Winner	FA Cup winner	Premier League winner	Ref
2010	Enyimba	Kaduna United F.C.	Enyimba	
2011		Heartland F.C.	Dolphins F.C.	
2012	Heartland F.C.	Heartland F.C.	Kano Pillars	
2013	Enyimba	Enyimba	Kano Pillars	
2014	Flying Eagles	Enyimba	Kano Pillars	
2015	Akwa United	Akwa United	Enyimba	
2016	Rivers United F.C.	Ifeanyi Ubah F.C.	Enugu Rangers	
2017 (Note: In addition to the four teams representing Nigeria on the continent, CHAN Eagles and host team, Kano Pillars joined the tournament, making it Super 6.)	CHAN Eagles	Akwa United	Plateau United F.C.	
2018	Lobi Stars F.C.	Rangers International F.C.	Lobi Stars F.C.	
2019	Not Held	Kano Pillars F.C.	Enyimba F.C.	
2020	Not Held	Not Held	Plateau United F.C.	
2021	Not Held	Bayelsa United F.C.	Akwa United F.C.	
2022	Not Held	Abandoned	Rivers United F.C.	
2023	Not Held	Bendel Insurance	Enyimba F.C.	
2024	Not Held	El-Kanemi Warriors	Rangers International F.C.	
