= Nigeria Super Cup =

Nigeria Super Cup (also known as Charity Cup or Charity Shield) is a game that features the FA Cup and Nigerian Premier League winners. It usually commence before the start of a new season.

== Winners ==
- 1999:Lobi Stars
- 2000: Julius Berger F.C.
- 2001: Enyimba F.C.
- 2002: Julius Berger F.C.
- 2003: Enyimba F.C.
- 2004: Enugu Rangers
- 2005: did not hold
- 2006: Ocean Boys F.C.
- 2007: did not hold
- 2008: Kano Pillars
- 2009: Bayelsa United
- 2010: did not hold
- 2011: did not hold
- 2012: did not hold
- 2013: did not hold
- 2014: did not hold
- 2015: Akwa United
- 2016: Ifeanyi Ubah F.C.
- 2017: did not hold
- 2018: Lobi Stars F.C.
