= Rodolfo Zapata =

Argentine coach

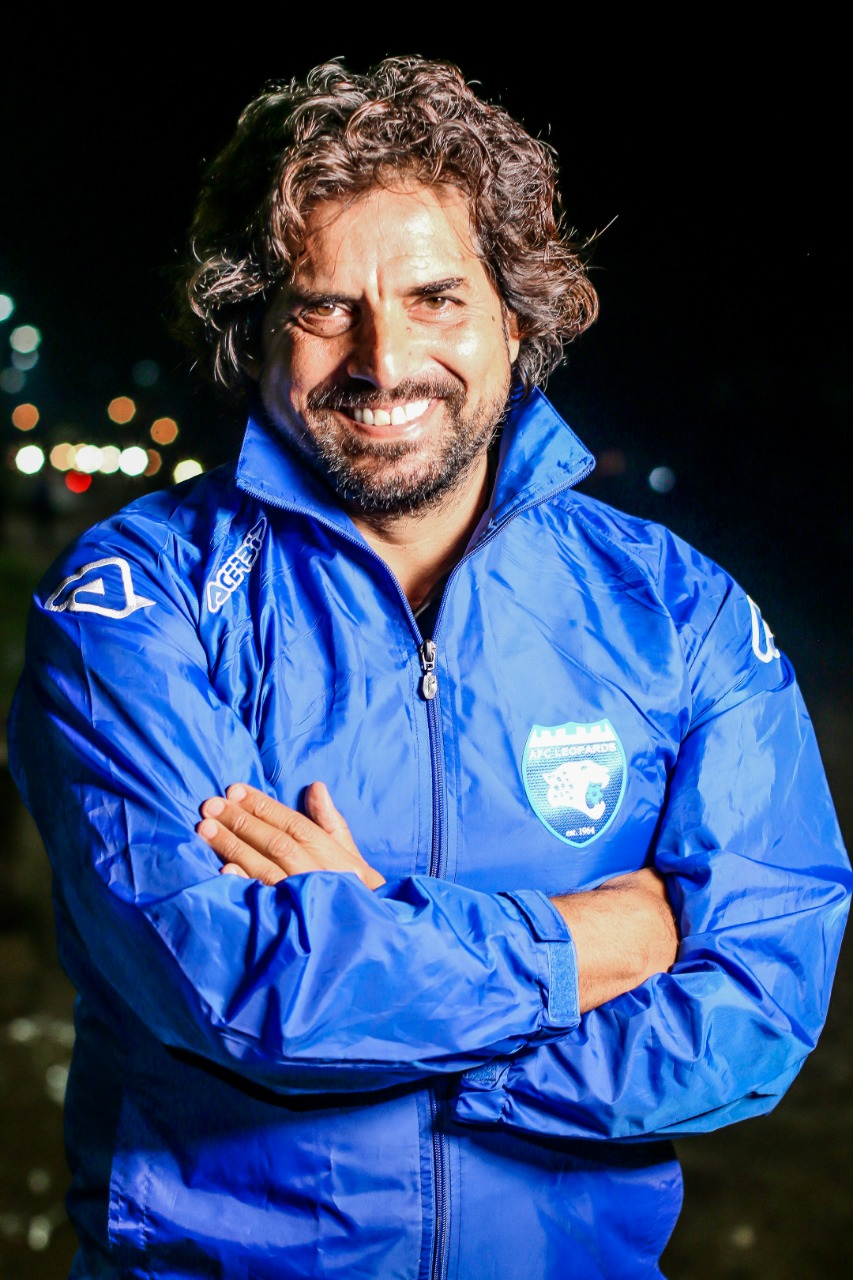

Personal information
- Full name: Rodolfo Zapata
- Date of birth: 1 May 1966 (age 60)
- Place of birth: Buenos Aires, Argentina

Managerial career
- Years: Team
- 2010: Sunshine Stars
- 2011–2012: Mpumalanga Black Aces
- 2016–2017: Gaborone United
- 2018: AFC Leopards
- 2019: Township Rollers
- 2021: Mukura Victory Sports
- 2022–2023: Fiji U20 National Team
- 2024–2025: Montego Bay United
- 2026: Thimphu City FC

Rodolfo Zapata (born 1 May 1966) is an Argentine professional football manager and former player who is the head coach of Bhutan Premier League club Thimphu City.

He holds Argentine Football Association and CONMEBOL PRO coaching licenses.

== Playing career ==
Zapata began his playing career as a goalkeeper in the Argentinian Primera B Nacional. He played for Huracán, Sportivo Italiano, Racing de Olavarría, San Miguel and Cipolletti.

== Managerial career ==
=== Canada ===
In 2000, Zapata taught seminars for coaches and players development in the cities of Calgary and Edmonton that were promoted by the Alberta Soccer Association. He also planned and coordinated activities of coaching staff.

=== United States ===
In 2001, he was the head coach of United Nations International School in New York City. He was head coach of the USA Olympic Development Program from 2001 to 2009, a national program for identifying and developing youth football players to represent the United States in international competitions.

=== Nigeria ===
In January 2010, he was appointed head coach of Nigeria Professional Football League side Sunshine Stars.

=== South Africa ===
For the 2011–12 season, Rodolfo was appointed as head coach of Mpumalanga Black Aces of the South African National First Division.

=== Return to the United States ===
In September 2012, Zapata returned to the United States as head coach of the United States Youth Soccer Association and the New Jersey Youth Soccer Association. His role was the identification and recruitment of young players.

=== Botswana ===
From 2016 to 2018, Zapata was head coach of Gaborone United of the Botswana Premier League. The club suffered financial and internal troubles during his time. He contributed to the progress of fifteen under-23 players into the first team, while avoiding relegation.

=== Kenya ===
In May 2018, AFC Leopards announced Zapata as their new head coach for the remainder of the Kenyan Premier League season.

=== Return to Botswana ===
In 2019, Zapata was appointed as the new head coach of Township Rollers in Botswana. He won the 2018–19 Botswana Premier League with the club. As a result, Township Rollers qualified for the 2019–20 CAF Champions League. As head coach, Zapata oversaw a possession-based and attacking style of play.

=== Rwanda ===
In March 2021, Rodolfo joined Mukura Victory Sports of the Rwanda Premier League.

=== Fiji ===
After his experience in Rwanda, Zapata signed as head coach of the Fiji national under-20 team for the 2023 FIFA U-20 World Cup.

=== Jamaica ===
Zapata joined Montego Bay United of the Jamaica Premier League ahead of the 2024–25 season. At the time of his departure, Montego Bay United were third in the league.

=== Bhutan ===
In March 2026, Rodolfo Zapata was appointed head coach of Thimphu City FC in Bhutan. Under his management, the club finished the 2026 Bhutan Premier League in second place, with 12 wins, 4 draws and 2 losses, scoring 49 goals and conceding 14.
