= Rising Stars F.C. =

Nigerian football club

Rising Stars
- Full name: Rising Stars Football Club
- Founded: 2006; 19 years ago
- Ground: Ondo City Stadium
- Capacity: 15,000
- Chairman: Oluwafisayo Akinkuade
- Manager: Sunday Erelesusi
- League: Nigeria Nationwide League
Home colours	Away colours

Rising Stars Football Club is a Nigerian football club based in Ondo City. They play in the third division in Nigerian football, the Nigeria Nationwide League.

Their home stadium is Ondo City Stadium, but for some of the 2012 season they played games at Kayode Stadium in Ado-Ekiti.

== History ==
The club was originally a farm club to the major team Sunshine Stars F.C. They won the Nigeria Amateur League in 2009 and were promoted to the Nigeria National League. They placed second in their division in 2011 by one point to join their parent team at the top level of Nigerian football. After regulation in 2012, they self regulated further to the Nationwide League to save funds, but remained in the National League when fixtures were announced in December 2012. They were relegated at the end of the 2012–13 season after placing 14th of 15 teams.

== Notable coaches ==
- (Argentina) Rodolfo Zapata
