= Kano Pillars F.C. =

Nigerian football club

Kano Pillars
- Full name: Kano Pillars Football Club
- Nickname: Sai Masu Gida
- Founded: 1990; 36 years ago
- Ground: Sani Abacha Stadium; Kano
- Capacity: 16,000
- Chairman: Musbahu Ahmad Garo
- Manager: Daniel Ogunmodede
- League: Nigeria Professional Football League
- 2025–26: 15th of 20
Home colours	Away colours

Kano Pillars Football Club is a Nigerian professional football club based in Kano, northwestern Nigeria. They play in the Nigeria Professional Football League, the first-tier division in Nigerian football. They play their home games at Sani Abacha Stadium.

Kano Pillars FC was founded in 1990, the year the professional association football league started in Nigeria, and it is also among the oldest clubs in Nigerian history alongside clubs like Bendel Insurance, Shooting Stars, and Enugu Rangers. It was an amalgamation of three amateur clubs in Kano State.

Kano Pillars Football Club is the most popular club in Nigeria. The Pillars drew an average home attendance of 8,894 in the 2023–24 edition of the NPFL, the 2nd-highest in the league.

== History ==
Founded in 1990, by Alhaji Ibrahim Galadima, former chairman of Nigeria Football Association and former sports commissioner of Kano, from the combination of WRECA FC, Kano Golden Stars and Bank of the North FC, Kano Pillars achieved outstanding success by winning the 2007–08 Nigerian Premier League. Kano Pillars produced players like Abiodun Baruwa who has since played for Swiss, Austrian, Welsh and British Clubs and Sani Kaita who later plays for Sparta Rotterdam in the Netherlands. Another Prominent player is Ahmed Garba 'Yaro Yaro' who later plays for AB in Denmark and a notable player from Kano Pillars FC is Ahmed Musa who played for Leicester City in the English Premier league after joining from CSKA Moscow. It was registered as a limited liability company with the Corporate Affairs Commission, Nigeria, and then registered with the Nigeria Football Association (NFA) as a professional football club.

In the 2020/2021 NPFL season, Kano Pillars were fined a whopping sum of ₦7,500,000.00 for failing to follow the orders of the LMC and NFF, which prohibited fans from viewing live games in the stadium. Fans disrupted a top table clash between Akwa United and Kano Pillars. The game ended 0–0 after it was concluded the following day.

They were relegated from NPFL on 16 July 2022 following the confirmation of a verdict against them for the deduction of 3 points, despite an appeal which the NFF committee disregarded against their complaint. The verdict on them was a penalty for what their former chairman did to match officials in their encounter with Dakkada FC

=== 2009 Champions League ===
They are also nicknamed "Ahly Killers" as they scored 2 magnificent goals in Egypt and drew with Al Ahly Cairo in Egypt 2–2 and 1–1 in Nigeria, so the Ahly Killers went to the Group stage in the African Champions League on the away goals rule. They made it to the semi-finals before being eliminated against fellow Nigerian team Heartland.

== Honours ==
- Nigerian Premier League
  - Champions (4): 2007–08, 2012, 2013, 2014
  - Runners-up (1): 2009–10
- Nigeria Federation Cup
  - Winners (2): 1953, 2019
  - Runners-up (2): 1991, 2018
- Nigeria Super Cup
  - Winners (1): 2008

== Performance in CAF competitions ==
- CAF Champions League: 6 appearances

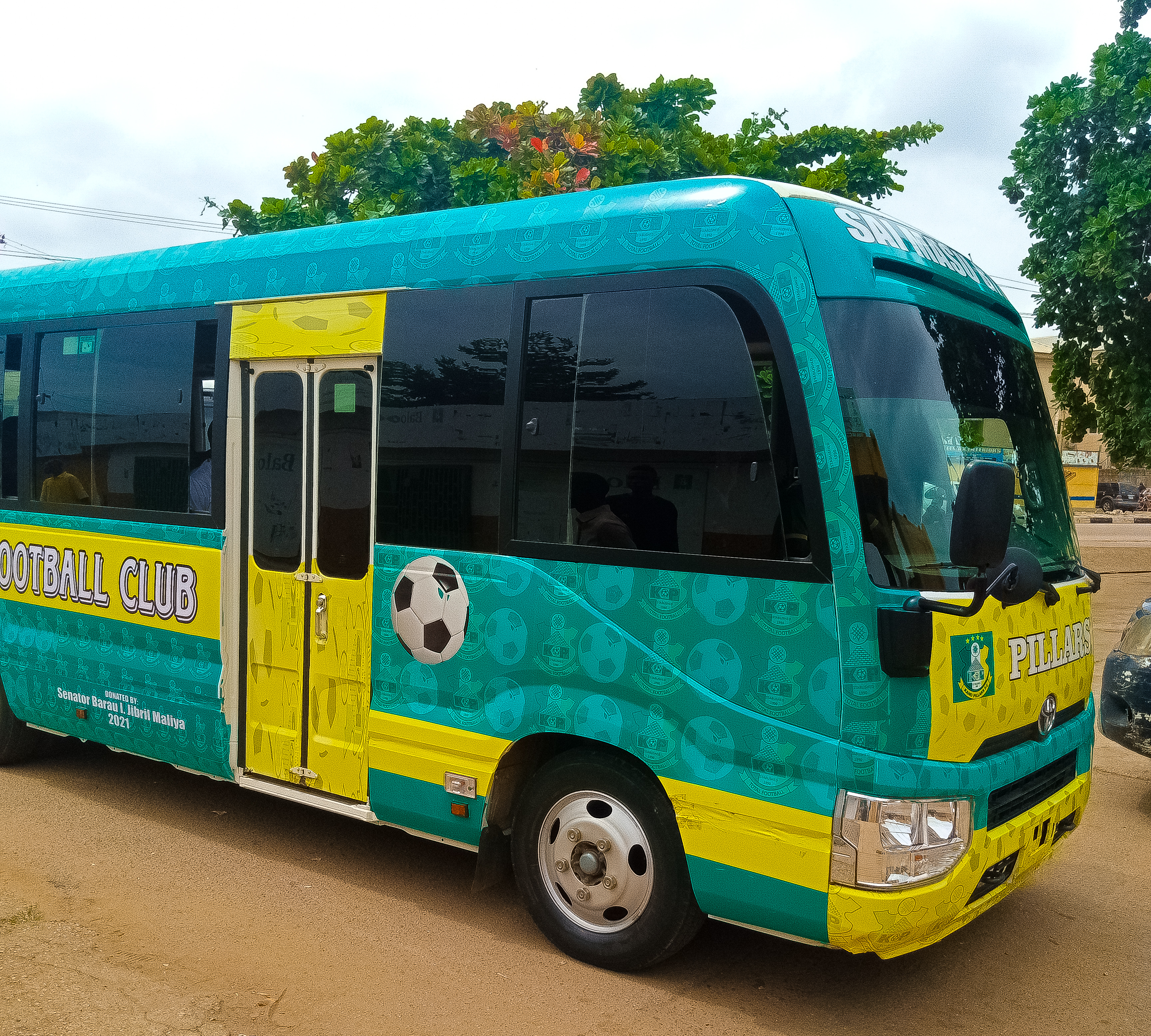
Kano Pillars' arrival at Ahmadu Bello Stadium for a friendly match.

2009 – Semi-finals
2011 – First round
2013 – First round
2014 – Preliminary round
2015 – First round
2020 – Preliminary round

== Current players ==
As of 8 February 2024

Note: Flags indicate national team as defined under FIFA eligibility rules; some limited exceptions apply. Players may hold more than one non-FIFA nationality.

No.	Pos.	Nation	Player
1	GK	NGA	Abdallah Sulaiman
2	DF	NGA	Ali Abdullahi
3	DF	NGA	Ismaila Nasir
4	MF	NGA	Shehu Abdullahi
5	DF	NGA	Abdullahi Musa
6	MF	NGA	Suleiman Idris
7	FW	NGA	Ahmed Musa
8	MF	NGA	Yusuf Maigoro
9	FW	NGA	Auwalu Ali Malam
10	MF	NGA	Rabiu Ali (Captain)
11	FW	NGA	Mustapha Umar
12	MF	NGA	Aminu Mohammed
14	DF	NGA	Ibrahim Abubakar
16	FW	NGA	Mustapha Salisu
18	MF	NGA	Sani Mubarak
19	FW	NGA	Ibrahim Mustapha

No.	Pos.	Nation	Player
20	FW	NGA	Ibrahim Abdullahi
22	FW	NGA	Muhammad Yakubu
23	DF	NGA	Sani Faisal
24	MF	NGA	Aminu Sani
25	MF	NGA	Joshua Dua
26	DF	NGA	Habibu Yakubu
27	DF	NGA	Ibrahim Nura
28	FW	NGA	Yusuf Abdullahi
29	MF	NGA	Mubarak Lawan
30	DF	NGA	Fahad Usman
31	GK	NGA	Mohammed Galadima
33	GK	NGA	Muttaka Musa
34	DF	NGA	Attairu Mushinu
36	MF	NGA	Muhammed Usman
38	FW	NGA	Umar Shehu
40	FW	NGA	Abba Adam

=== Staff ===
Head Coach/Technical Adviser

- Yaseer Sani Salisu El, Hakimee

Chairman

- Babangida Umar Little

general manager

- Umar Babangida (Little)

General Coordinator

- Salisu Yaro

Kit Manager

- Habibu Zubair Abubakar

Marketing Manager

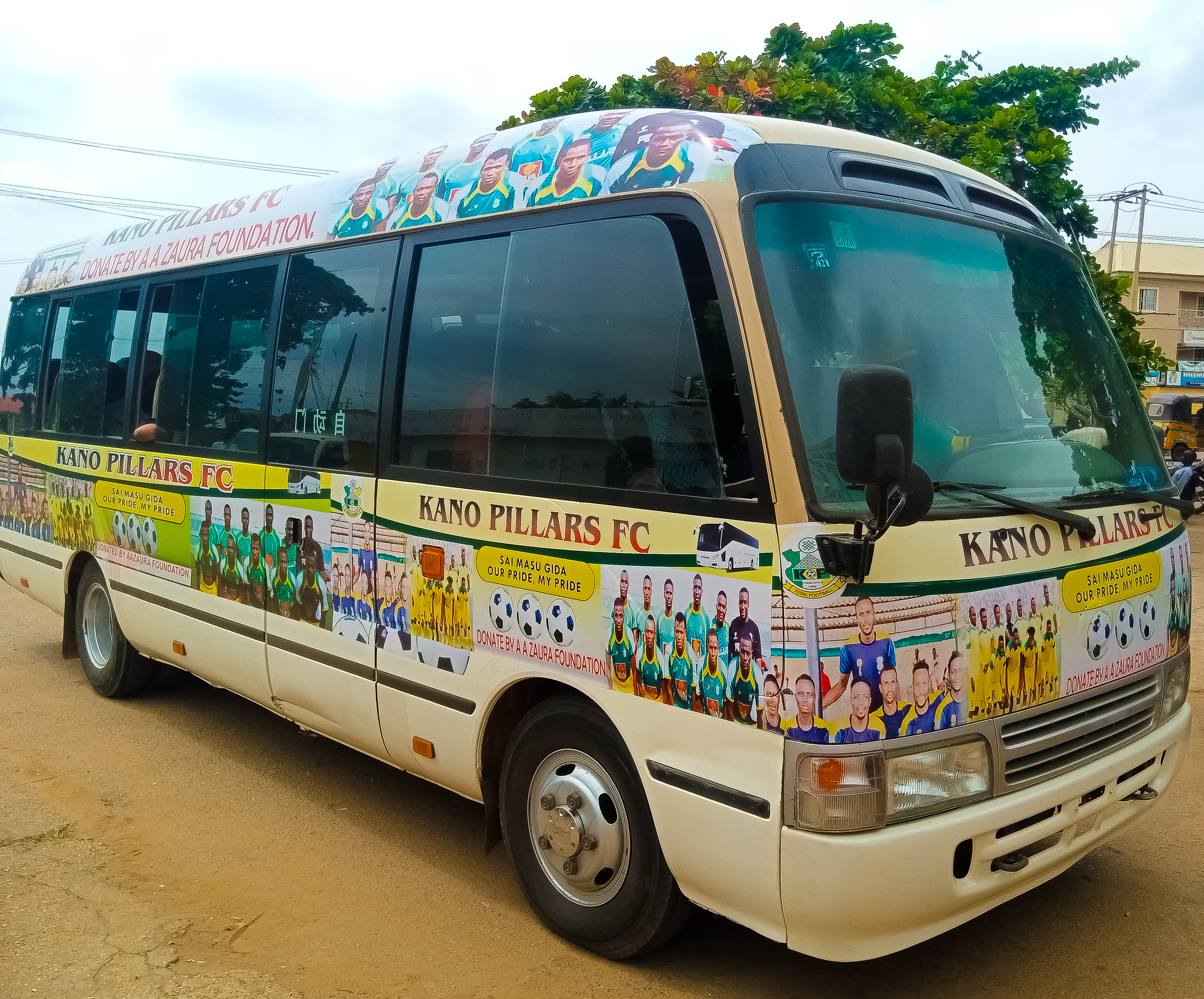
- Kano Pillars' team bus.

== Notable coaches ==
- (Ghana) Malik Jabir (2008–) (Technical Adviser)
- (Ghana) Ahmed Pele Abdu
- (Nigeria) Ladan Bosso (2011)
- (Nigeria) Baba Ganaru
- (Nigeria) Kadiri Ikhana (1991), (1997–98), (2007–08), (2016–date)
- (Slovenia) Ivo Sajh (2009)

Salisu Yusuf Okey Emordi Evans Ogenyi

== Notable players ==
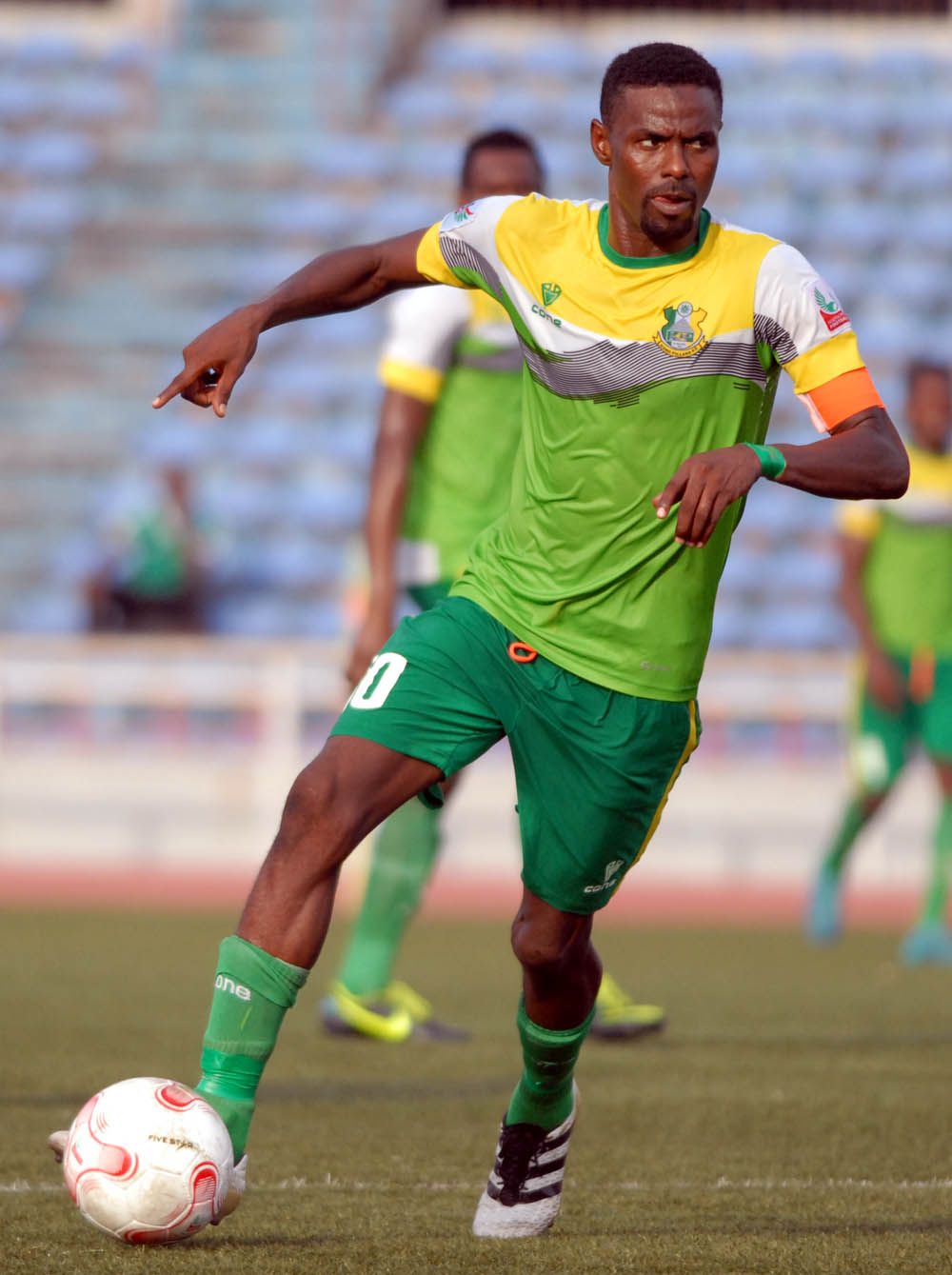
Rabiu Ali playing for the Kano Pillars

- (Nigeria) Rabiu Ali
- (Nigeria) Ahmed Musa
- (Nigeria) Junior Lokosa
- (Nigeria) Chinedu Udoji
- (Nigeria) Ndubisi Chukunyere
- (Nigeria) Yaseer El, Hakimee
