= Lobi Stars F.C. =

Association football club

- Lobi Stars F.C.
- Full name: Lobi Stars Football Club
- Nickname: Alia Boys
- Founded: 1981 by late Bishop A.A. Usuh
- Ground: Aper Aku Stadium; Makurdi, Benue State, Nigeria
- Capacity: 15,000
- Chairman: Simon Terver Ikya
- Manager: Bala Nikyu
- League: Nigeria Premier Football League
- 2024–25: Nigeria Premier Football League, 20th of 20
Home colours	Away colours

Lobi Stars Football Club (formerly known as Mosquito Football Club, Lobi Bank, BBL Hawks, and Hawks) is a Nigeria professional football club based in Makurdi, Benue. The club competes in the Nigerian National League. The Stars' home is the 15,000-seater Aper Aku Stadium.

== History ==
Lobi Stars FC founded as Hawks of Makurdi in 1981 by the Benue State sports council, the club was renamed Benue Breweries Limited (BBL) Hawks Football Club, when the state-owned Breweries acquired the club in 1985. There was another change again when the state-owned Lobi Bank acquired the club in 1990 and named it Lobi Bank Football Club.

In 1999, the Nigeria Football League was played in a new format which saw the top four teams squaring up in a knockout Super League at the National Stadium, Surulere. Lobi Stars won the maiden edition of the Nigerian Super League under coach Godwin Koko Uwua's management. Lobi Stars won its first and only FA Cup title in 2003 after beating Sharks FC of Port-Harcourt.

In 2005 they reached the finals of the domestic FA Cup where they lost to Enyimba.

They finished the 2008–09 season with 13 wins, 10 draws and 15 losses after winning a game on appeal against Enugu Rangers, avoiding the drop by one point.

In August 2009, the Benue State government announced the club will be leased to private ownership, ending direct support from the State, but that never materialised. Lobi finished 3rd in the Glo Premier League in 2012. They also reached the Federation Cup final that season but lost to Heartland F.C. of Owerri.

== Honours ==
- Nigeria Professional Football League
  - Champions: 1999
- Nigeria FA Cup
  - Winners: 2003
- Nigeria Super Cup
  - Winners: 1999, 2018

== Performance in CAF competitions ==
- CAF Champions League

2000 – Group stage
2018–19 – Group stage

- CAF Confederation Cup

2004 – Second round
2006 – Second round
2012 – First round

- WAFU Club Championship

2010 – First round

== Current squad ==
As of 8 February 2024

Note: Flags indicate national team as defined under FIFA eligibility rules; some limited exceptions apply. Players may hold more than one non-FIFA nationality.

No.	Pos.	Nation	Player
1	GK	NGA	Daniel Atsaka
2	DF	NGA	John Lazarus
31	DF	NGA	Solomon Kwambe
6	DF	NGA	Jimmy Iteji
10	FW	NGA	Stanley Oganbor
8	MF	NGA	Kumaga Suur
9	FW	NGA	Barnabas Imenger
11	FW	NGA	Samuel Tiza Iorwuese
12	GK	NGA	Emmanuel Daniel
13	DF	NGA	Orji Kalu Okagbue
14	FW	NGA	Dabani Godwin Alao
16	FW	NGA	Waheed Adebayo
17	DF	NGA	Moses Tsehuan

No.	Pos.	Nation	Player
20	MF	NGA	Ajibola Adeleke
19	CF	NGA	Ossy Martins
21	MF	NGA	Christian Madu
25	DF	NGA	Nnamdi Frank
33	MF	NGA	Ifeanyi Assurance
22	MF	NGA	Onah Peter
27	DF	NGA	Monday Akile
28	MF	NGA	Ahmadu Liman
5	FW	NGA	Yem Reubem
30	GK	NGA	Akor Itodo
33	DF	NGA	Agbanyi Vershima
34	CB	NGA	Arinze Ogbonna
37	FW	NGA	Olorintoba Segun
35	FW	NGA	Itim Paul

== Coaching staff ==
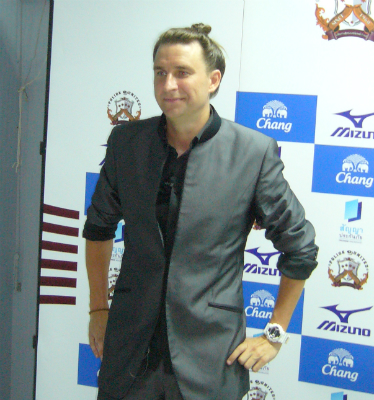
Mika Lönnström became the manager of the Lobi Stars in 2024.

As of 8 November 2024

Name	Role
(Finland) Mika Lönnström	Head coach
(Nigeria) Tar Akombo	Assistant coach
(Nigeria) Save Okoh	Goalkeeping coach
(Nigeria) Benjamin Bemgba Jiki	Coach
(Nigeria) Daniel Amokachi	Technical advisor

== Former managers ==
- (Nigeria) Shaibu Amodu
- (Serbia) Kosta Papić
- (Nigeria) Godwin Uwua
- (Nigeria) Salisu Yusuf
- (Nigeria) Ufere Nwankwo
- (Bulgaria) Mitko Dobrev (2009–??)
- (Nigeria) John Zaki
- (Nigeria) Garba Lawal
- (Nigeria) Solomon Ogbeide
- (Nigeria) Gbenga Ogunbote
- (Nigeria) Kabiru Dogo
- (Nigeria) Eddy Dombraye
- (Nigeria) Eugene Agagbe

== Notable players ==
- Kelechi Okoye
