= Mattar M'Boge =

Gambian football coach

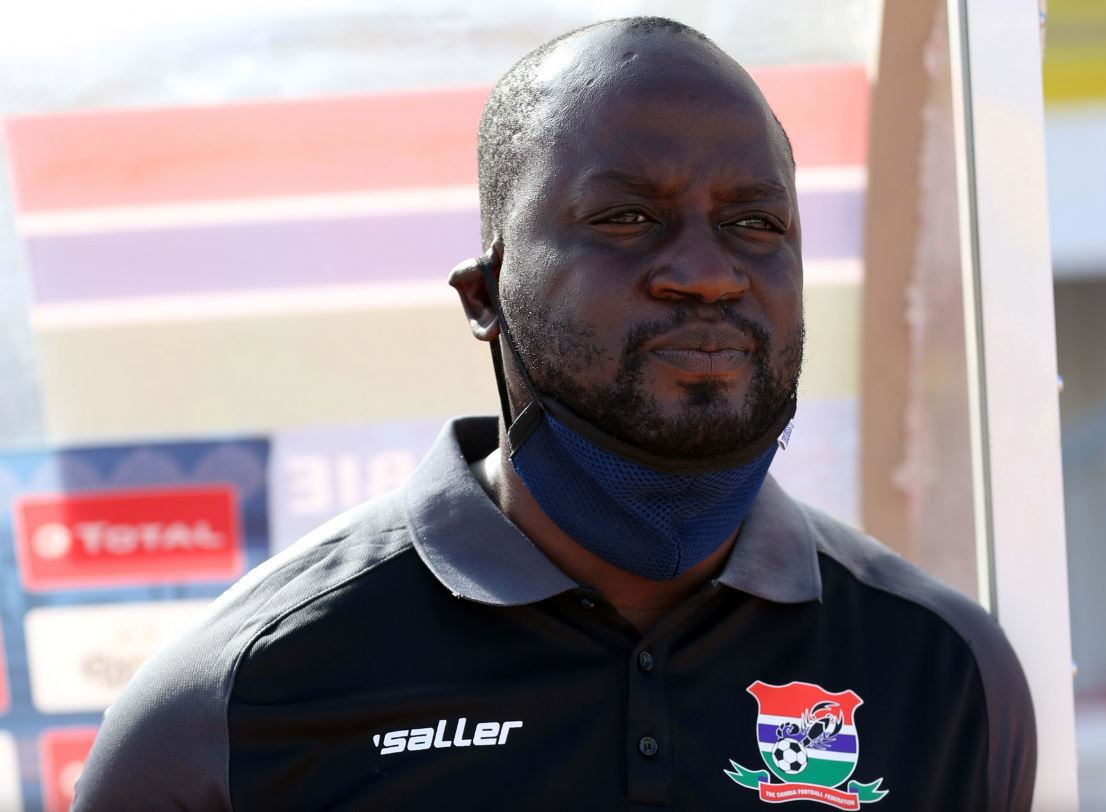

Personal information
- Date of birth: 21 June 1980 (age 46)
- Place of birth: Banjul, The Gambia

Team information
- Current team: AC Horsens (Transition Coach)

College career
Years	Team	Apps	(Gls)
- Loughborough University

Managerial career
- 2004–2007: Loughborough University
- 2012–2014: Barnet (academy coach)
- 2014: Real de Banjul
- 2015: Nigeria U-23 (assistant)
- 2015–2017: Gambia U-17
- 2015–2022: Gambia (assistant)
- 2017–2022: Gambia U-20
- 2021–2022: Gambia U-23
- 2022–2023: Loudoun United (assistant)
- 2022–2023: D.C. United (U-19 head coach)
- 2024–: AC Horsens (transition coach)
Medal record
Men's football
Representing Gambia (as manager)
WAFU U-20 Championship
Gold medal – first place	2018
WAFU U-20 Championship
Bronze medal – third place	2019
WAFU U-20 Championship
Gold medal – first place	2020
Africa U-20 Cup of Nations
Bronze medal – third place	2021

Mattar M'Boge (born 21 June 1980) is a football coach and former player.

He was promoted from his previous role as Head Coach of the U-17 national team to Head Coach of the Gambia national under-20 football team in October 2017. He is also the former head coach for Real de Banjul.

== Early life ==
M'Boge moved with his family to Saudi Arabia at the age of 4.

== Coaching career ==
=== Gambia U20 ===
As head coach of the Gambia national under-20 football team he secured the 2018 WAFU/FOX U-20 Tournament title in his first international assignment. The tournament was hosted by Liberia and the Young Scorpions were the only unbeaten team in the tournament. This was the first ever trophy at U-20 level for the country and he became the first Gambian head coach to win an international trophy and also became the youngest coach (aged 37) to achieve this accolade so far.

Following their triumph, the team was received by the President of The Gambia, Adama Barrow, who congratulated them and expressed his pride for their achievements.

He led the team to third place in the 2019 WAFU U-20 Tournament held in Conakry, Guinea.

M'Boge won a second WAFU A Championship at the 2021 Africa U-20 Cup of Nations qualification as the team earned the sole zonal qualifying spot for the 2021 Africa U-20 Cup of Nations for the third time in the country's history and ten years after their previous qualification to the 2011 African U-20 Championship. He was also awarded 'Best Coach' at the end of tournament awards after stunning hosts Senegal in the final by winning 4-3 on penalties following a 2-2 draw after extra time.

He guided the team to the semi-finals at the 2021 Africa U-20 Cup of Nations where they lost to eventual winners Ghana, before securing the bronze medal in the play-off match after beating Tunisia 4-2 on penalties following a 0-0 draw after extra-time.

=== Loudoun United FC ===
M'Boge joined the staff of USL Championship club Loudoun United FC in July 2022. M'Boge departed Loudoun in January 2024.

=== AC Horsens ===
In January 2024, M'Boge joined Danish 1st Division side AC Horsens as transition coach.

== Honours ==
Real de Banjul

- GFA League First Division: 2014

Gambia U-20

- WAFU U-20 Championship : 2018
- WAFU U-20 Championship third place : 2019
- WAFU U-20 Championship : 2021
- Africa U-20 Cup of Nations third place : 2021
- Qualification for the 2021 FIFA U-20 World Cup

Individual

- WAFU 'A' U-20 Championship 'Best Coach': 2020
- Gambia Football Coaches' Association Achievement Award: 2021
- Sports Journalists' Association of The Gambia Award: 2021

== See also ==
- Gambia national under-17 football team
- Gambia national under-20 football team
