= Nigeria national under-20 football team =

National association football team

Nigeria Under-20
- Nickname: Flying Eagles
- Association: Nigeria Football Association
- Confederation: CAF (Africa)
- Sub-confederation: WAFU (West Africa)
- Head coach: Aliyu Zubairu
- Home stadium: Agege Stadium
- FIFA code: NGA
First colours	Second colours

FIFA U-20 World Cup
- Appearances: 13 (first in 1983)
- Best result: Runners-up (1989, 2005)

Africa U-20 Cup of Nations
- Appearances: 18 (first in 1978–79)
- Best result: Champions (1983, 1985, 1987, 1989, 2005, 2011, 2015)

WAFU Zone B U-20 Tournament
- Appearances: 3 (first in 2018)
- Best result: Champions (2022)

The Nigerian men's national under-20 football team represents Nigeria in men's international football also known as the Nigeria Under-20s or nicknamed the Flying Eagles. The Flying Eagles is the youth team for the national soccer in Nigeria. It plays a large role in the development of Nigerian football, and is considered the feeder team for the senior team. It is controlled by the Nigerian Football Federation. The team has won a record seven African U-20 Cup of Nations titles and are also two-times runners-up of the FIFA U-20 World Cup.

== Competitive record ==
=== FIFA U-20 World Cup record ===
FIFA U-20 World Cup record
Year	Round	Pld	W	D*	L	GF	GA
(Tunisia) 1977	Did not qualify						
(Japan) 1979	Did not qualify						
(Australia) 1981	Did not qualify						
(Mexico) 1983	Group stage	3	1	1	1	1	3
(Soviet Union) 1985	Third place	6	3	1	2	8	7
(Chile) 1987	Group stage	3	0	1	2	2	8
(Saudi Arabia) 1989	Runners-up	6	2	2	2	9	10
(Portugal) 1991	Did not qualify						
(Australia) 1993	Did not qualify						
(Qatar) 1995	Did not qualify						
(Malaysia) 1997	Did not qualify						
(Nigeria) 1999	Quarter-finals	5	1	2	2	6	7
(Argentina) 2001	Did not qualify						
(United Arab Emirates) 2003	Did not qualify						
(Netherlands) 2005	Runners-up	7	3	2	2	10	5
(Canada) 2007	Quarter-finals	5	3	1	1	5	5
(Egypt) 2009	Round of 16	4	1	0	3	7	6
(Colombia) 2011	Quarter-finals	5	4	0	1	15	5
(Turkey) 2013	Round of 16	4	2	0	2	7	5
(New Zealand) 2015	Round of 16	4	2	0	2	8	5
(South Korea) 2017	Did not qualify						
(Poland) 2019	Round of 16	4	1	1	2	6	5
(Argentina) 2023	Quarter-finals	5	3	0	2	6	4
(Chile) 2025	Round of 16	4	1	1	2	4	8
(Azerbaijan) (Uzbekistan) 2027	To be determined						
(Armenia) (Georgia (country)) 2029	To be determined						
Total	14/26	65	27	12	26	94	83

=== Africa U-20 Cup of Nations record ===
Africa U-20 Cup of Nations
Year	Round	Position	GP	W	D*	L	GS	GA
1977	Did not enter							
1979	Semi-finalists	3rd	4	1	2	1	4	3
1981	Semi-finalists	3rd	4	1	0	3	7	8
1983	Champions	1st	8	5	1	2	13	7
1985	Champions	1st	8	4	2	2	14	8
1987	Champions	1st	8	6	1	1	11	9
1989	Champions	1st	8	5	3	0	16	6
(Egypt) 1991	Did not enter							
(Mauritius) 1993	Group stage	5th	3	1	0	2	2	2
(Nigeria) 1995	Third place	3rd	5	3	1	1	8	6
(Morocco) 1997	Did not qualify							
(Ghana) 1999	Second place	2nd	5	3	1	1	11	5
(Ethiopia) 2001	Group stage	8th	3	0	1	2	1	6
(Burkina Faso) 2003	Did not qualify							
(Benin) 2005	Champions	1st	5	5	0	0	11	3
(Republic of the Congo) 2007	Second place	2nd	5	2	1	2	6	6
(Rwanda) 2009	Third place	3rd	5	3	0	2	8	5
(South Africa) 2011	Champions	1st	5	4	0	1	9	4
(Algeria) 2013	Third place	3rd	5	3	0	2	6	5
(Senegal) 2015	Champions	1st	5	4	0	1	12	4
(Zambia) 2017	Did not qualify							
(Niger) 2019	Fourth place	4th	5	2	1	2	4	1
(Mauritania) 2021	Did not qualify							
(Egypt) 2023	Third place	3rd	6	4	0	2	8	2
Total	18/23	7 titles	97	56	14	27	151	90

A gold background colour indicates that Nigeria won the tournament.

*Draws include knockout matches decided on penalty kicks.

*There was no third place match from 1979-1989.

== Team honours and achievements ==
Intercontinental

- FIFA U-20 World Cup
  - Runners-up: 1989, 2005
  - Third-place: 1985

Continental

- Africa U-20 Cup of Nations
  - Winners: 1980, 1985, 1987, 1989, 2005, 2011, 2015
  - Runners-up: 1999, 2007
  - Third-place: 1979, 1981, 1995, 2009, 2013, 2023
- Football at the African Games
  - Silver medal: 2019

Sub-Continental

- WAFU U-20
  - Silver: 2018
  - Quarterfinals: 2008

== Staff ==
- Head Coach: Aliyu Zubairu
- First Assistant Coach: Usman Garba Suleiman
- Second Assistant Coach: Emeka Uzoma
- Scout: Hubert Okeke
- Goalkeepers' Trainer: Babajide Adegoke

== Current squad ==
The following players were named in the squad for the 2025 U-20 Africa Cup of Nations, to be played 27 April – 18 May 2025.

No.	Pos.	Player	Date of birth (age)	Caps	Goals	Club
1	GK	Ebenezer Harcourt	9 October 2009 (age 17)	0	0	(Nigeria Football Federation) Sporting Lagos
16	GK	Abubakar Rufai	5 January 2008 (age 18)	0	0	(Nigeria Football Federation) Mavlon
23	GK	Ajia Yakub	1 April 2005 (age 21)	0	0	(Football Association of Serbia) Novi Pazar
2	DF	Ba Abba Maigari	1 June 2006 (age 20)	0	0	(Nigeria Football Federation) El-Kanemi Warriors
3	DF	Odinaka Okoro	1 January 2007 (age 19)	0	0	(Nigeria Football Federation) Sporting Lagos
5	DF	Chigozie Ihejiofor		0	0	(Nigeria Football Federation) Katsina United
6	DF	Daniel Bameyi	4 January 2006 (age 20)	11	0	(Nigeria Football Federation) Bayelsa United
22	DF	Emmanuel Chukwu	7 November 2006 (age 19)	0	0	(German Football Association) 1899 Hoffenheim
4	MF	Caleb Ochedikwu	2 September 2005 (age 21)	2	0	(Croatian Football Federation) Uljanik Pula
8	MF	Suleiman Alabi	5 December 2005 (age 20)	0	0	(Nigeria Football Federation) El-Kanemi Warriors
10	MF	Israel Isaac Ayuma	8 August 2005 (age 21)	0	0	(Croatian Football Federation) Istra 1961
14	MF	Simon Karshe Cletus	10 February 2008 (age 18)	0	0	(Nigeria Football Federation) Mavlon
15	MF	Auwal Ibrahim	26 January 2006 (age 20)	0	0	(Nigeria Football Federation) Akwa United
17	MF	Adamu Shafiu Duguri	20 June 2006 (age 20)	0	0	(Nigeria Football Federation) Wikki Tourists
24	MF	Yushau Armiyau	18 October 2006 (age 20)	0	0	(Nigeria Football Federation) Katsina United
7	FW	Clinton Jephta	21 October 2006 (age 20)	0	0	(Nigeria Football Federation) Enyimba
9	FW	Kparobo Arierhi	11 January 2007 (age 19)	0	0	(Norwegian Football Federation) Lillestrøm
11	FW	Bidemi Amole	10 November 2008 (age 17)	0	0	(Nigeria Football Federation) Real Sapphire
12	FW	Precious Benjamin	1 October 2006 (age 20)	0	0	(German Football Association) 1899 Hoffenheim
13	FW	Divine Oliseh	13 September 2007 (age 19)	0	0	Unknown
18	FW	Rickson Theophilus Mendos	18 November 2006 (age 19)	0	0	(Nigeria Football Federation) Niger Tornadoes
19	FW	Ezekiel Anthony Kpangu	21 April 2006 (age 20)	0	0	(Nigeria Football Federation) Ijele
20	FW	Matthew Kingsley	26 November 2006 (age 19)	0	0	Unknown
21	FW	Tahir Maigana	30 June 2008 (age 18)	0	0	Unknown

== Former coaches ==
- Christopher Udemezue (1 July 1982 – 30 June 1987/1988)
- Paul Hamilton (1 July 1985 – 30 June 1986)
- Olatunde Nurudeen Disu (1987–1997)
- Thijs Libregts (1 July 1998 – 30 June 1999)
- Samson Siasia (1 January 2005 – 26 March 2007; 30 June 2009)
- Ladan Bosso (2007–2009)
- John Obuh (1 July 2010 – 1 February 2013)
- Emmanuel Amunike (1 July 2014 – 1 November 2017)
- Paul Aigbogun (1 January 2019 – 30 June 2020)
- Ladan Bosso (2020 - 2024)

== Head-to-head record ==
The following table shows Nigeria's head-to-head record in the FIFA U-20 World Cup.

Opponent	Pld	W	D	L	GF	GA	GD	Win %
Argentina	2	1	0	1	3	2	+1	50.00
Australia	1	1	0	0	3	2	+1	100.00
Brazil	6	0	1	5	2	15	−13	0.00
Canada	2	1	1	0	4	2	+2	50.00
Chile	1	0	0	1	0	4	−4	0.00
Costa Rica	2	1	1	0	2	1	+1	50.00
Croatia	1	1	0	0	5	2	+3	100.00
Cuba	1	1	0	0	3	0	+3	100.00
Czech Republic	1	0	1	0	1	1	+0	0.00
Dominican Republic	1	1	0	0	2	1	+1	100.00
England	1	1	0	0	1	0	+1	100.00
France	1	0	0	1	2	3	−1	0.00
Germany	3	1	0	2	4	4	+0	33.33
Guatemala	1	1	0	0	5	0	+5	100.00
Hungary	1	1	0	0	2	0	+2	100.00
Italy	2	1	0	1	2	2	+0	50.00
Japan	1	0	1	0	0	0	+0	0.00
Mali	1	0	0	1	1	3	−2	0.00
Mexico	1	1	0	0	2	1	+1	100.00
Morocco	1	1	0	0	3	0	+3	100.00
Netherlands	2	0	2	0	1	1	+0	0.00
North Korea	1	1	0	0	4	0	+4	100.00
Paraguay	1	0	0	1	1	2	−1	0.00
Portugal	3	0	0	3	2	6	−4	0.00
Qatar	1	1	0	0	4	0	+4	100.00
Republic of Ireland	1	0	1	0	1	1	+0	0.00
Saudi Arabia	2	2	0	0	4	1	+3	100.00
Scotland	1	1	0	0	2	0	+2	100.00
Senegal	1	0	0	1	1	2	−1	0.00
South Korea	3	1	0	2	2	3	−1	33.33
Soviet Union	4	1	2	1	6	6	+0	25.00
Spain	1	0	0	1	0	2	−2	0.00
Switzerland	1	1	0	0	3	0	+3	100.00
Tahiti	1	1	0	0	5	0	+5	100.00
Ukraine	2	1	1	0	2	1	+1	50.00
United States	2	1	0	1	2	3	−1	50.00
Uruguay	1	0	0	1	1	2	−1	0.00
Venezuela	1	0	0	1	0	1	−1	0.00
Zambia	1	1	0	0	2	1	+1	100.00
Total	61	26	11	24	90	75	+15	42.62
