= European Multisport Club Association =

Sports organization of multisport clubs in Europe

- Formation: 2013; 13 years ago
- Type: Sports organization
- Headquarters: Legal: Rome, Italy; Operational: Brussels, Belgium
- Members: 30 clubs
- Website: www.multisportclubs.eu

The European Multisport Club Association (EMCA) is a sports organization representing the interests of multisport clubs in Europe. It was created with an initiative of the multisport club S.S. Lazio.

EMCA is also a partner of the House of Sport and member of the European Platform for Sport Innovation.

== Purpose ==
The aim is the development and dissemination of sports, as a mean of psycho-physical and moral integrity, promoting the activities of the affiliated sports clubs operating on European scale and organizing projects, erasmus trips and events for the exchange of good practice, sports promotion, maintenance of the human body in shape and entertainment youth activities. Particular attention is given at the fight against doping, intolerance and violence, access to sport for people with disabilities, social inclusion of immigrants and gender equality .

In the European sport system a significant role is played by multisport clubs who – through their multiple involvement on a large variety of sports – understand better than anyone else the different social dimensions, impacts and needs of sports.

== Projects ==
EMCA organizes projects in association with erasmus trips, to promote the Olympic Spirit, spread of values and civic behaviour, importance of physical activity, voluntary activities, integration of young refugees, multisport approach of young athletes and to report fraud, bribery, abuse, bullying and manipulated illegal sport betting. Finally, particular interest represents the acquisition of new knowledge and skills, through teaching and education, for multisport coaches' development, helping kids choose the most suitable sport.

== Founding members ==
The following six clubs signed the «Multisport Declaration» in 2013:

- (Greece) Olympiacos C.F.P.
- (Greece) Panionios G.S.S.
- (Hungary) Ferencvaros Budapest
- (Italy) S.S. Lazio
- Racing Club de France
- Sporting Clube de Portugal

== All EMCA members ==
As of 2022

EMCA consists of various clubs who keep departments in 42 sports.

Club
(Denmark) AaB Af 1885
(Cyprus) APOEL
(Greece) Aris
(Serbia) Crvena Zvezda
(Romania) Dinamo Bucuresti
(United Kingdom) Everton
(Hungary) Ferencvaros Budapest
(Netherlands) Feyenoord Rotterdam
(Montenegro) Buducnost Podgorica
(Croatia) Hask Mladost
(Bulgaria) Levski Sofia
(Greece) Olympiacos C.F.P.
(Greece) G.S. Iraklis Thessaloniki
(Greece) Panionios G.S.S.
(Italy) Pontevecchio Bologna
(Italy) Polisportiva Udinese
Racing Club de France
(Italy) S.S. Lazio
(Italy) Sport Management
Sporting Clube de Portugal
(Finland) Tampereen Pyrintö
(Turkey) Galatasaray SK
(Germany) Bayer 04 Leverkusen
(Poland) TS Wisla Krakow
(Austria) Wiener Sport-Club
(Czech Republic) Bohemians 1905
(Italy) A.C. ChievoVerona
(Greece) Panserraikos
(Austria) Fechtclub Graz
(Italy) Polisportiva Partenope

== Decorated Clubs ==
The following table includes founding and rest EMCA members with multiple European title-winning sport departments.

| Club | Departments with European trophies | | | | | | | |
|---|---|---|---|---|---|---|---|---|
| (Greece) Olympiacos CFP | Football | Basketball | Volleyball M | Volleyball W | Water Polo M | Water Polo W | Table tennis | Wrestling |
| (Portugal) Sporting CP | Football | Handball | Roller Hockey | Futsal | Athletics M | Athletics W | Judo | |
| (Hungary) Ferencváros TC | Football | Water Polo | Handball W | Table Tennis W | Bowling | | | |
| Racing Club de France | Athletics | Swimming | Judo | | | | | |
| (Italy) S.S. Lazio | Football | American Football | Softball | | | | | |
| (Serbia) SD Crvena Zvezda | Football | Basketball M | Basketball W | Water Polo | Athletics | Karate | | |
| (Turkey) Galatasaray SK | Football | Basketball M | Basketball W | Basketball Wheel | Judo W | | | |
| (Bulgaria) Levski Sofia | Basketball W | Volleyball W | Athletics W | | | | | |
| (Germany) Bayer Leverkusen | Football | Handball W | Athletics W | | | | | |
| (Croatia) Mladost | Volleyball W | Water Polo | Table Tenis W | | | | | |
| (Romania) Dinamo Bucuresti | Volleyball | Handball | Rugby | | | | | |
| (Montenegro) Buducnost Podgorica | Handball W | Karate | | | | | | |

* Founding members are above the borderline, and rest members are under the borderline. * Individual-sport departments appear with a cyan background. * M = Men, W = Women

== See also ==
- European Football Clubs
- G-14
