= Gold Cup Preseason =

- Organiser(s): Tunde Shamsudeen
- Founded: 2012
- Region: Nigeria and West Africa
- Teams: Varies
- Current champions: Sporting Lagos
- Most championships: NA

The Gold Cup Preseason, also known at various times as the Optima Energy Gold Cup and the Ogunjobi Gold Cup Preseason, for sponsorship reasons, is an annual football preseason tournament held in Nigeria. The competition features clubs primarily from the Nigeria Professional Football League and other professional divisions in Nigeria, with occasional participation from clubs in other West African countries.

The tournament was founded and coordinated by Nigerian football administrator Tunde Shamsudeen, and serves as a preparatory competition for professional clubs ahead of the Nigerian football season. There is participation from several top clubs including Enyimba F.C., Kano Pillars F.C., Rivers United F.C., Shooting Stars S.C., Rangers International F.C.and Remo Stars F.C.

The tournament reached its 13th edition in 2025.

== History ==
The competition was founded and coordinated by Nigerian football administrator Tunde Shamsudeen, with the aim of providing competitive match experience for clubs before the start of league campaigns. It has grown into a prominent preseason competition in Nigerian club football, attracting teams from the top tiers of the country's football pyramid as well as clubs from neighbouring West African countries. Prominent Nigerian clubs such as Enyimba F.C., Kano Pillars F.C., Rangers International F.C., Rivers United F.C., Shooting Stars S.C., Sporting Lagos and Remo Stars F.C. have participated in different editions of the tournament. Different editions of the tournament have been held under various sponsorship titles. These include the Optima Energy Gold Cup and the Ogunjobi Gold Cup Preseason Tournament, the latter organised in honour of former Nigerian football administrator Taiwo Ogunjobi.

Participating teams from outside Nigeria have included Association Sportive de la Vallée de l’Ouémé (ASVO).

The tournament has attracted partnerships with corporate organisations and sports brands over the years. The 13th edition featured clubs from Nigeria's professional leagues, serving as a preparatory competition ahead of the domestic football season

== 2026 Edition ==
The 2026 edition was the fourteenth edition of Nigeria's longest Preseason tournament and featured the following teams Abakaliki FC, Dokkal Khairu FC, Doma United FC, Grassrunners FC, Inter Lagos, Ikorodu City, Sunshine Stars with four of those teams namely; Grassrunners FC, Doma United FC, Inter Lagos, Dokkal Khairu FC making their debut at the tourney.

Grassrunners FC emerged as champions of the fourteenth edition, going unbeaten in the process. The Ikenne based team capped its impressive campaign by defeating Abakaliki FC by three goals to nil in the final to claim the title in its maiden edition.

== See also ==
- Nigeria Professional Football League
- Nigeria FA Cup
- Nigeria Football Federation
