= Boubacar Fall =

Senegalese footballer (born 2001)

Personal information
- Date of birth: 3 February 2001 (age 25)
- Place of birth: Thiaroye-sur-Mer, Senegal
- Height: 1.98 m (6 ft 6 in)
- Position: Goalkeeper

Youth career
- Guédiawaye

Senior career*
Years	Team	Apps	(Gls)
2019–2021	Guédiawaye		
2021–2025	Saint-Étienne B	32	(0)
2022–2025	Saint-Étienne	1	(0)

International career^{‡}
2019–2020	Senegal U20		
2022–	Senegal U23	2	(0)
- * Club domestic league appearances and goals as of 04:37, 3 June 2024 (UTC) ‡ National team caps and goals as of 19:12, 11 May 2023 (UTC)

Boubacar Fall (born 3 February 2001) is a Senegalese professional footballer who plays as a goalkeeper.

== Club career ==
Having begun his career at Guédiawaye in his native Senegal, Fall joined French club Saint-Étienne on a professional deal on 5 January 2021, following the termination of Stéphane Ruffier's contract at the club. Seven months later on 5 August, Fall extended his contract with Saint-Étienne until June 2025. On 30 December 2022, he made his professional debut for the club in a 1–1 Ligue 2 draw against Caen. In March 2023, Fall suffered a meniscus injury for which he had to undergo surgery; Saint-Étienne announced that he would be expected to spend six months on the sidelines.

== International career ==
With the Senegal U20s, Fall was designated as the best goalkeeper in the 2019 WAFU U-20 Tournament, a competition won by Senegal. He went on to win the 2020 Arab Cup U-20 with the same team.

== Honours ==
Senegal U20

- WAFU U-20 Tournament: 2019
- Arab Cup U-20: 2020

Individual

- WAFU U-20 Tournament Best Goalkeeper: 2019
