= Ebenezer Harcourt =

Nigerian footballer (born 2009)

Personal information
- Full name: Ebenezer Ifeanyi Harcourt
- Date of birth: 21 October 2009 (age 17)
- Place of birth: Umunteke-Asa, Ukwa West, Abia State, Nigeria
- Position: Goalkeeper

Team information
- Current team: Sporting Lagos

Youth career
- 2019–2025: Sporting Lagos Academy

Senior career*
Years	Team	Apps	(Gls)
2025–	Sporting Lagos	10	(0)

International career^{‡}
2025–	Nigeria U20	9	(0)
2025–	Nigeria	1	(0)
- * Club domestic league appearances and goals as of 20:00, 22 December 2025 (UTC) ‡ National team caps and goals as of 20:00, 22 December 2025 (UTC)

Ebenezer Ifeanyi Harcourt (born 21 October 2009) is a Nigerian professional footballer who plays as a goalkeeper for Nigeria Premier Football League club Sporting Lagos and the Nigeria national team.

Harcourt was born in Umunteke-Asa, Ukwa West in Abia State, Nigeria. He played youth football with Sporting Lagos Academy before starting his professional career with Sporting Lagos. Harcourt won his first cap with the Nigeria national team in 2025, becoming the youngest player to represent Nigeria. He was also the youngest player at the 2025 U-20 Africa Cup of Nations.

== Early life ==
Ebenezer Ifeanyi Harcourt was born on 21 October 2009 in Umunteke-Asa, Ukwa West, Abia State, Nigeria. His father is Ifeanyi Harcourt, a goalkeeper trainer for Nigerian football club Enyimba.

== Club career ==
Harcourt joined the Sporting Lagos Academy at 10 years old. He played in the Nigeria National League. Harcourt won the Gothia Cup with the academy in 2024.

On 28 November 2025, Harcourt debuted for Sporting Lagos in the Nigeria National League.

== International career ==
He was selected for the Nigeria national under-20 football team at 15 and was the youngest player in the 2025 U-20 Africa Cup of Nations. In the quarter-final, Harcourt saved two penalties in Nigeria's shoot-out victory over defending champions Senegal, ensuring Nigeria's qualification for the 2025 FIFA U-20 World Cup. In five games, he kept three clean sheets and conceded two goals in normal play, and attracting interest from Nigeria Premier Football League and foreign clubs.

Harcourt saved a penalty in the shootout with Niger in the semi-final of the 2025 WAFU Zone B U-20 Championship, contributing to Nigeria's victory. Ivory Coast defeated Nigeria 1–0 in the final, in which he spilled a free kick.

Prior to the 2025 FIFA U-20 World Cup, Premier League club Manchester United sent scouts to observe Harcourt in Chile and ESPN named him as one of the five Nigeria players to watch at the championship.

Harcourt won his first cap with the Nigeria national team on 19 August 2025, keeping a clean sheet in a 2–0 victory over Congo in Group D of the 2024 African Nations Championship to become the youngest player to represent the Nigeria senior team at 15. Harcourt was named in Éric Chelle's provisional squad for World Cup qualifiers against Rwanda and South Africa in September.

== Style of play ==
Harcourt's coaches at Sporting Lagos Academy lauded his mentality and technical prowess. An academy director noted that Harcourt trained hard and with purpose. Infonews stated that his work ethic was why he was directly called up to the U20 national team.

Harcourt has been described as courageous and imposing by ESPN, a "teenage wall" by the CAF, and a general by Infonews, whose abilities and mentality are on par with older, experienced players. Following his performances at the 2025 U-20 Africa Cup of Nations, a scout said Harcourt could be among the best African goalkeepers in the next five years. Infonews deemed him a prospect for the Nigeria national team and its future keeper. After Harcourt's senior debut, head coach Chelle praised his "talent and maturity".

== Career statistics ==
=== Club ===
As of match played 13 September 2026

Appearances and goals by club, season and competition
Club	Season	League			FA cup		Total	
Club	Season	Division	Apps	Goals	Apps	Goal	Apps	Goals
Sporting Lagos	2025–26	Nigeria National League	7	0	1	0	8	0
Sporting Lagos	2026–27	Nigeria Premier Football League	7	0	0	0	7	0
Career total			14	0	1	0	15	0

=== International ===
As of match played 19 August 2025

Appearances and goals by national team and year
National team	Year	Apps	Goals
Nigeria	2025	1	0
Total		1	0

== Honours ==
Sporting Lagos Academy

- Gothia Cup: 2024

Records

- National team youngest player: 15 years old
- 2025 U-20 Africa Cup of Nations youngest player: 15 years old
