= CS Dinamo București =

Romanian sports club

- Full name: Clubul Sportiv Dinamo București
- Founded: 14 May 1948; 78 years ago
- Based in: Bucharest, Romania
- Colours: Red, White
- President: Ionuţ Adrian Popa
- Website: Club home page

CS Dinamo București (full name: Clubul Sportiv Dinamo București), or Dinamo for short, is a multi-sport club from Bucharest, Romania.

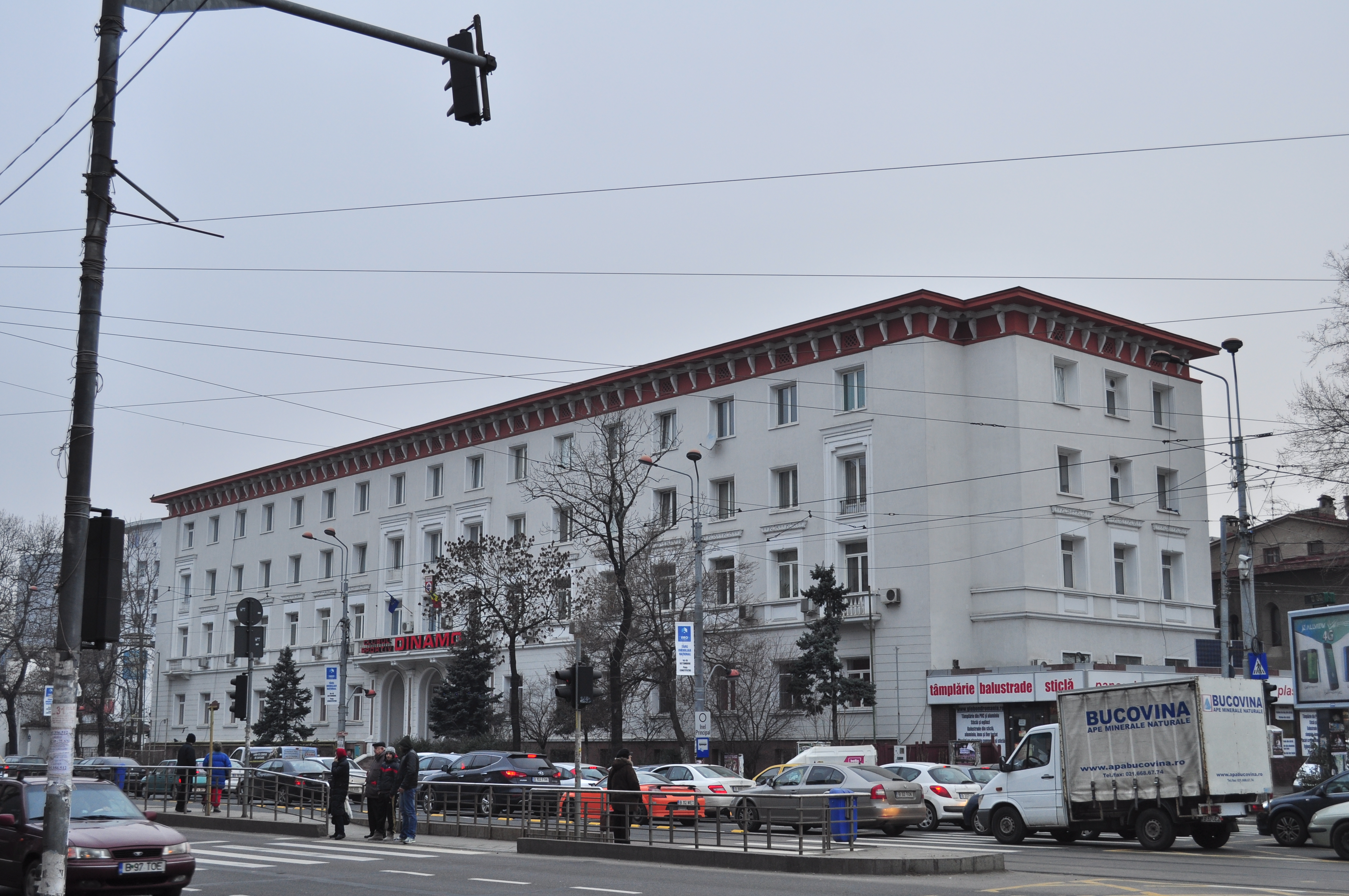
CS Dinamo București headquarter

== History ==
The club was founded in the spring of 1948, being subordinate to the Ministry of the Interior. From the beginning it was intended to be a strong competitor to the Romanian Army's sports club, CSCA București, later known as CSA Steaua București.

Dinamo is also a member of the European Multisport Club Association EMCA.

== Record ==
(1948-2020)

- Olympic Games (1956 - 2020)

- 131 medals (38 gold, 44 silver, 49 bronze)

- World Championships

- 1163 medals (398 gold, 373 silver, 392 bronze)

- European Championships

- 1,621 medals (536 gold, 516 silver, 569 bronze)

- The European Olympic Games

- 7 medals (3 gold, 3 silver, 1 bronze)

- Balkan Championships

- 3854 medals (1338 gold)

- World University Games

- 206 medals (77 gold)

- European Champions Cup

- 10 first places (3 men's volleyball, 1 handball, 1 rugby, 4 fencing, 1 tennis)

- 6 places II (fencing)

- 1 place III (fencing)

- Cup of Cups

- 1st place (men's volleyball)

- Olympic Records: 5
- World Records: 4
- National Records: 2,655
- National Champion Titles: 12,900

World Championships 1948-2015
Sport	Gold	Silver	Bronze	Total
Martial Arts	138	111	135	384
Athletics	6	5	7	18
Boxing	2	8	11	21
Canoeing	62	88	73	223
Rowing	59	46	45	150
Cycling	0	0	1	1
Gymnastics	14	14	10	38
Weightlifting	9	6	12	27
Handball	4	0	2	6
Judo	0	4	7	11
Wrestling	4	15	16	35
Swimming	0	0	3	3
Skydiving	1	0	0	1
Fencing	3	5	7	15
Chess	0	2	0	2
Skiing	2	1	1	4
Shooting	2	3	4	9
Men's Volleyball	0	2	0	2
Women's Volleyball	0	1	0	1
Modern Karate	23	16	19	58
Total	329	327	353	1009
