= Loughborough Students F.C. =

Association football club in England

Coordinates: 52.759327°N 1.242444°W

Loughborough University
- Full name: Loughborough University Students Football Club
- Nickname: The Scholars
- Founded: 1920 as Loughborough College
- Ground: Loughborough University Stadium, Loughborough
- Capacity: 3,300
- Chairman: Richard Allen
- Manager: Jamie Clapham
- League: Northern Premier League Division One Midlands
- 2025–26: Northern Premier League Division One Midlands, 17th of 22
Home colours

Loughborough University Football Club (also known as Loughborough Students Football Club) is an English football club representing Loughborough University, based in Loughborough, Leicestershire. The club are currently members of the Northern Premier League Division One Midlands and play at the Loughborough University Stadium.

== History ==
The club was founded in 1920 under the name Loughborough College. They joined Division Two of the Leicestershire Senior League in 1966, where they remained until 1972. The club then left Senior football, and did not return until 2007 when they were promoted to the Premier Division of the Midland Combination. In 2008–09 they won the league's Premier Division, and were promoted to the Midland Alliance. The Scholars ground shared at fellow local side Loughborough Dynamo until moving into the new Holywell Park, Loughborough University Stadium.

In 2011, the club beat Boldmere St Michaels 4–2 to lift the League Cup at Walsall's Bescot Stadium, then won the trophy again the following season when they beat Tipton Town 2–0.

Manager Stuart McLaren resigned from his post in 2014 after being announced as the new Stirling Albion manager. Following this, Michael Skubala was appointed as part time Performance Manager and put former Chesterfield manager John Duncan and Graham Harvey in charge of the 1st team. However, they were not able to avoid finishing in the bottom three of the Midland Football League Premier. Relegation was nonetheless avoided due to Causeway United folding at the end of the season.

For the 2015–16 season, the club turned to former Quorn AFC assistant manager and experienced non-league manager Karl Brennan, and saw an upturn in results in his first part time management role.

In January 2017, Richard Allen, formally Head of Recruitment at Tottenham Hotspur, Academy Manager at QPR, and more recently Head of Talent at the Football Association, was appointed as the first ever Director of Football. Alex Ackerley was subsequently confirmed as the full time Men's Head Coach and Mat Stock elevated from Programme Coordinator to Programme Manager.

The team managed to narrowly avoid relegation in the 2016–17 season.

With the reorganisation of the Step 5 leagues in 2019, Loughborough Students FC were moved in to the United Counties League. The club reached the final of the Leicestershire and Rutland FA Senior Cup Final only to lose out in the final to Step 3 side Coalville Town FC

In 2021, former Leeds, Middlesbrough, Hull, and Barnsley Assistant Manager and former Ipswich and Birmingham player Jamie Clapham was appointed as Men's Head Coach replacing Alex Ackerley who joined Sunderland FC's academy as a coach.

In the 2021–22 season, the Scholars were crowned BUCS National Champions for the first time in nine years and were semi-finalists in the FA Vase (losing away to Littlehampton Town), their best ever performance in the Vase. In the 2022–23 season, they narrowly missed out on an inter-league play-off place. In the 2023–24 season, after finishing third in the league, they secured promotion via the playoffs beating Skegness 7–0 in the playoff final, gaining promotion for the first time to non-league Step 4, and were runners up in the Leicestershire and Rutland County Cup.

== Notable former players ==
Alumni that went on to play or work in football include:

- Anthony Pinto
- Oladapo Afolayan
- Ebby Nelson-Addy
- Alan Bradshaw
- Tom Curtis
- Greg Fee
- Lee Howarth
- Ray Long
- Mattar M'Boge
- Paul McGuinness
- Leon McSweeney
- Rob Matthews
- Bradley Pritchard
- Lawrie Sanchez
- Robbie Simpson
- Tony Waiters
- George Williams
- Bob Wilson
- Dario Gradi
- Barry Hines
- Ted Powell
- Keith Blunt
- Alan Bradshaw
- Chris Forino-Joseph
- Aditi Chauhan
- Niels Hartman
- Eric Ramsay
- Harry Twite

== Records ==
- Best FA Cup performance: 1st qualifying round, 2011–12, 2021–22, 2022–23, 2024–25
- Best FA Trophy performance: 1st round, 2026–27
- Best FA Vase performance: Semi-finals, 2021–22

== Honours ==
- United Counties League
  - Premier Division North playoff champions 2023–24
