= Alan Bradshaw =

English footballer (1941–2020)

Personal information
- Full name: Alan Mitchison Bradshaw
- Date of birth: 14 September 1941
- Place of birth: Carlisle, Cumbria, England
- Date of death: 18 October 2020 (aged 79)
- Position: Midfielder

Youth career
- Carlisle United

Senior career*
Years	Team	Apps	(Gls)
1962–1965	Blackburn Rovers	11	(2)
1965–1973	Crewe Alexandra	294	(50)
1973–1974	Macclesfield Town	35	(4)
Total		340	(56)
- * Club domestic league appearances and goals

Alan Bradshaw (14 September 1941 – 18 October 2020) was an English professional footballer who played as a midfielder for Blackburn Rovers, Crewe Alexandra, and Macclesfield Town.

== Career ==
Born in Blackburn, Lancashire. He attended QEGS and Loughborough College where he studied PE and Geography. He joined Blackburn Rovers as a youth and was a member of the team that won the Youth Team Cup beating West Ham. Bradshaw scored in his Rovers first team debut in a 4–2 defeat away to Wolverhampton Wanderers, and made 10 further appearances for the club, scoring twice, before leaving for Crewe Alexandra in 1965. He also spent time with Loughborough College in the early 1960s.

Bradshaw was later a youth team coach at Blackburn and managed local clubs Great Harwood, Padiham, Clitheroe .

== Honours ==
with Crewe Alexandra

- Football League Fourth Division fourth-place promotion: 1967–68
