= WAFU Zone A U-20 Championship =

Association football tournament

- Zone A Zone B
- Founded: 2018
- Region: International (CAF) (WAFU)
- Teams: 8
- Current champions: Gambia (2 titles)
- Most championships: Gambia (2 titles)
- 2020 WAFU Zone A U-20 Tournament

The WAFU Zone A U-20 Championship is an association football tournament that is contested between competition contested by national teams of Zone A of the West African Football Union. The current champions are Gambia.

== Eligible participants ==
- Cape Verde
- Guinea
- Guinea-Bissau
- Liberia
- Mali
- Mauritania
- Senegal
- Sierra Leone
- Gambia

== 2018 edition ==
Eight teams were drawn in two groups of four from WAFU Zone A members including hosts Liberia, Senegal, Mali, Guinea, Cape Verde, Guinea Bissau, Sierra Leone and The Gambia. Mauritania declined to participate in the tournament and Cape Verde later withdrew to be replaced by Ivory Coast.

== Tournaments ==
Year	Host	Final			Third Place Match
Year	Host	Winner	Score	Runner-up	3rd Place	Score	4th Place
2018 Details	Liberia	Gambia	2 – 1	Liberia	Mali	1 – 0	Ivory Coast
2019 Details	Guinea	Senegal	2 – 0	Mali	Gambia	0 – 0 (8–7 pen)	Sierra Leone
2020 Details	Senegal	Gambia	2 – 2 (4–3 pen)	Senegal	Guinea-Bissau	No Game	Guinea
2022 Details	Mauritania	Senegal	1 – 0	Gambia	Mali	No Game	Mauritania
2024 Details	Liberia	Senegal	2 – 0	Sierra Leone	Gambia	3 - 0	Guinea
2026 Details	Mali	Guinea	1 – 0	Gambia	Senegal	2 - 2 (6–5 pen)	Sierra Leone

== See also ==
- WAFU Zone B U-20 Tournament
- WAFU U-20 Championship
