= Gothia Cup =

International youth football tournament

- Founded: 1975
- Region: International
- Teams: 1700 teams
- Website: www.gothiacup.se

The Gothia Cup (Swedish pronunciation: [ɡuːtɪa ˈkɵpː]) is an international youth association football tournament organized by professional football club BK Häcken, which has been held annually since 1975 in Gothenburg, Sweden. Considered the biggest tournament in the world in terms of participating teams, competing youth teams throughout the world enter the competition. The Gothia Cup is also Sweden's largest annual event. Series 4 of the BBC's Jamie Johnson (TV series) portrays Phoenix FC, a grassroots football club competing in the Gothia Cup.

== Overview ==
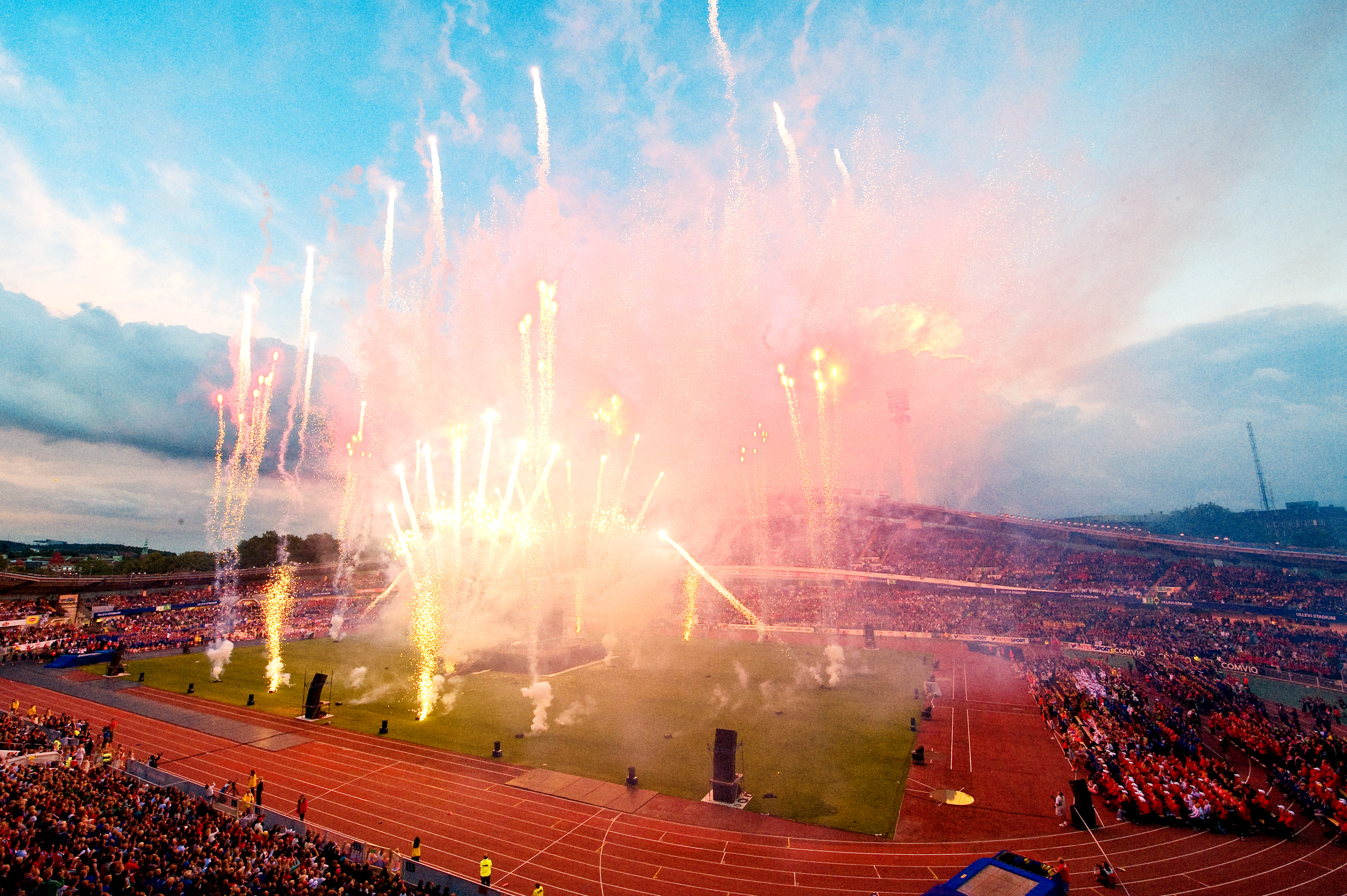
The opening ceremony and finals are held at Ullevi, Gothenburg.

Spanning one week the Gothia Cup is a youth association football tournament held annually in Gothenburg, Sweden, open for both boys and girls of ages 11 to 18. In terms of participants, it is the world's largest youth football tournament, with ~40,000 participants in 2017 vs. Norway Cup's (the second largest) ~30,000. In 2017, 1730 teams from 82 nations participated, making it the most internationally diverse youth football tournament as well.

The Gothia Cup started in 1975 with 275 participating teams. In July each year, the event becomes the dominant event in Gothenburg, with (as of 2017) 4,349 games played on 110 fields, and 300,000 visitors to the center in Heden. According to the tourist authorities of Gothenburg, the 2006 Gothia Cup generated 282 million Swedish krona in tourist income for Gothenburg city and 118 million krona in tax income for Sweden.

Teams compete from across the world; such as from Brazil, United Arab Emirates, Bangladesh and the Czech Republic.

In 2020, for the first time since the tournament's inaugural season, the tournament was not held, due to the COVID-19 pandemic in Sweden.

=== Gothia Cup China ===
The concept of Gothia Cup was exported to China in the 2010s. In 2016, the Gothia Cup China, a sister tournament to the Gothia Cup, was established in Shenyang, China. The inaugural Gothia Cup China took place from 13 to 19 August 2016 at the newly built Gothia Cup Football Park. The tournament featured 250 participating teams from 20 nations, although a reliable citation is needed to support this information.

== Famous participants ==
This list includes notable players who played in Gothia Cup in their youth and later had been playing for their national teams.

- (Togo) Emmanuel Adebayor (with Les Eperviers)
- (Spain) Xabi Alonso (with Antiguoko)
- (Sweden) Joel Asoro (won with IF Brommapojkarna 2010)
- (Brazil) Júlio Baptista (with Pequeninos do Jockey)
- (Morocco) Yassine Bounou (with Wydad AC)
- (Scotland) Gordon Durie (with Hill of Beath Swifts)
- (Bolivia) Marco Etcheverry (with AD Tahuichi)
- (Sweden) Tobias Hysén
- (Sweden) Zlatan Ibrahimović (with Malmo)
- (Ivory Coast) Odilon Kossounou (with ASEC Mimosas)
- (Sweden) Dejan Kulusevski (won with IF Brommapojkarna 2010)
- (Sweden) Kim Källström (with BK Häcken 1997; with Partille IF 1996)
- (Indonesia) Egy Maulana Vikri (with ASIOP Apacinti)
- (Chile) Fabián Orellana (with CSD Colo Colo)
- (Italy) Andrea Pirlo (with USD Voluntas)
- (Bolivia) Erwin Sánchez (with AD Tahuichi)
- (Serbia) Slobodan Savić (with Jugović Kać)
- (England) Alan Shearer (with Wellington Juniors)
- (Iceland) Gylfi Sigurdsson (with Fimleikafelag Hafnarfjarðar F.H.)
- (Brazil) Bruno Viana (with Cruzeiro Esporte Clube)
- (Italy) Cristian Zaccardo (with FC Spilamberto)
- (Thailand) Anurak Srikerd (with Thamrong Thai Samosorn)
- (Brazil) Zé Roberto (with Pequeninos do Jockey)
- (Germany) Fiete Arp (with KFV Segeberg)
- (Germany) Morten Behrens (won with KFV Segeberg 2008)
- (Germany) Thore Jacobsen (won with KFV Segeberg 2008)
- (Sweden) Lucas Bergvall (won with IF Brommapojkarna 2019)
- (Nigeria) Ebenezer Harcourt (won with Sporting Lagos 2024)

== Champions ==
2025
| Age Group | Winner | Runner Up | Result |
|---|---|---|---|
| Boys U-18 | Sporting Supreme, NGA | Varbergs BoIS FC, SWE | 4-0 |
| Boys U-17E | Beyond Limits, NGA | ASEC Mimosas, CIV | 8-7 |
| Boys U-17 | SV Eichede, GER | SV Rugenbergen, GER | 3-0 |
| Boys U-16 | Nigerian Eagles, NGA | Maryland Bobcats FC, USA | 3-0 |
| SEF Trophy (Boys15) | IFK Göteborg, SWE | Sollentuna FK, SWE | 2-1 |
| Boys U-15 | Miami FC, USA | HBK Linköping, SWE | 7-6 |
| Boys U-14 | IFK Göteborg, SWE | Imperial Future, ESP | 8-7 |
| Boys U-14B | Minerva Academy FC, IND | CEF 18 Tucuman 1, ARG | 4-0 |
| Boys U-13 | SKF Academy Persib Cimahi, IDN | FC Stockholm Internazionale, SWE | 5-1 |
| Boys U-12 | Club Niupi, MEX | Section Elite Academy, FRA | 5-1 |
| Girls U-18 | IFK Göteborg, SWE | AG Caen Football, FRA | 3-0 |
| Girls U-17E | Minnesota Thunder Academy, USA | FCNE, USA | 1-0 |
| Girls U-17 | Älvsjö AIK FF 1, SWE | Hønefoss BK, NOR | 5-0 |
| Girls U-16 | Fredrikstad FK, NOR | Sydney University SFC, AUS | 6-5 |
| Girls U-15 | Enskede IK, SWE | Team Odense Q, DEN | 5-0 |
| Girls U-14 | Panthera FC, ENG | Breidablik, ISL | 6-1 |
| Girls U-14B | Volf Soccer Academy, CAN | Alnö IF, SWE | 7-6 |
| Girls U-13 | Makati FC, PHI | San Francisco Seals, USA | 6-0 |
| Girls U-12 | Pama, USA | IF Brommapojkarna, SWE | 4-0 |
| GSOT 1 | Special Olympics Uzbekistan, UZB | Insuperabili, ITA | 2-0 |
| GSOT 2 | Special Olympics Bharat, IND | Special Olympics Poland, POL | 3-1 |
| GSOT 3 | Special Olympics Germany 1, GER | Trollenäs IF, SWE | 7-6 |
| GSOT 4 | Special Olympics Hong Kong, HKG | FIFH, SWE | 5-1 |
| GSOT 5 | Special Olympics Germany 2, GER | Special Olympics Uzbekistan, UZB | 1-0 |

2024
| Age Group | Team 1 | Team 2 | Results |
|---|---|---|---|
| B18 | Jusball FC, ENG | FK Lillehammer, NOR | 0-1 |
| B17E | Sporting Lagos, NGA | FC Tokyo, JPN | 4-0 |
| B17 | Swindon Town FITC Red, ENG | AFC Eskilstuna, SWE | 0-2 |
| B16 | Stjarnan 1, ISL | NorCal Premier PDP, USA | 6-7 |
| SEF Trophy (B15) | IF Brommapojkarna, SWE | Malmö FF, SWE | 1-2 |
| B15 | Imperial Future, ESP | RS Sports, BRA | 4-2 |
| B14 | MUKP Dabrowa Gornicza, POL | CD Mercedarios, ESP | 0-2 |
| B14B | Intercups MX, MEX | Empire FC, UAE | 5-1 |
| B13 | Makati FC, PHI | Utsiktens BK, SWE | 6-4 |
| B12 | Fútbol Consultants Edson Soto, CRC | Vicente del Bosque Academy Orange, ESP | 2-0 |
| B11 | RS Sports, BRA | GAIS, SWE | 3-5 |
| G18 | Sogndal FK Damer, NOR | IK Uppsala Fotboll, SWE | 1-3 |
| G17E | Cerezo Osaka, JPN | NorCal Premier PDP, USA | 1-0 |
| G17 | Jitex BK, SWE | NorCal Premier PDP, USA | 0-5 |
| G16 | Throttur FC, ISL | Lerums IS, SWE | 3-0 |
| G15 | Dallas Texans Soccer Club, USA | Iconz Elite, USA | 1-0 |
| G14 | Hammarby IF, SWE | Iconz Elite, USA | 5-3 |
| G14B | Borgeby FK, SWE | Enskede IK, SWE | 7-5 |
| G13 | Hammarby IF, SWE | Jitex BK, SWE | 2-0 |
| G12 | Makati FC, PHI | Hammarby IF, SWE | 5-0 |
| G11 | Djurgårdens IF, SWE | Hammarby IF, SWE | 1-5 |
| GSOT 1 | Special Olympics Uzbekistan 1 | Special Olympics, LIT | 4-1 |
| GSOT 2 | Special Olympics, TKM | Special Olympics Indonesia DKI Jakarta | 1-2 |
| GSOT 3 | SKF India Special Olympics | Parasport Danmark 2 | 4-3 |
| GSOT 4 | Special Olympics Uzbekistan Girls | Special Olympics Lithuania Girls | 2-0 |

2023
| Age Group | Team 1 | Team 2 | Results |
|---|---|---|---|
| B18 | Utsiktens BK, SWE | Live your world cup | 4-2 |
| B17E | Right to Dream | AIK FF | 2-1 |
| B17 | CD Inter Vista Alegre | JFV A/O/B/H/H | 2-0 |
| B16 | Lillestrøm SK, NOR | ED Moratalaz | 0-1 |
| SEF Trophy (B15) | IFK Göteborg, SWE | Djurgårdens IF | 5-4 |
| B15 | Burgos CF, SPA | BK Höllviken/Skanör Falsterbo IF Black | 1-0 |
| B14 | San Francisco Deltas | Norrby IF | 1-2 |
| B14B | Saleby/Trässberg/Norra Härene | Hisingsbacka FC | 4-2 |
| B13 | Minerva Academy FC, IND | Ordin FC | 3-1 |
| B12 | Barra CFIS | FC New England | 8-7 |
| B11 | Academia Sebastian Roco | Norrby IF | 0-1 |
| G18 | Jitex BK | Varbergs BoIS FC | 1-0 |
| G17E | NorCal Premier PDP | Minnesota Thunder Academy | 1-5 |
| G17 | IFK Göteborg | BK Häcken | 3-2 |
| G16 | SV Eutingen | AS Laval | 2-1 |
| G15 | Northumberland Country Schools FA | Boo FF | 0-3 |
| G14 | KA | Hammarby IF FF | 0-1 |
| G14B | Makati FC | Kvarnsvedens IK | 8-9 |
| G13 | Kjelsås IL | OGC Nice | 3-1 |
| G12 | Hammarby IF FF | FC New England | 4-3 |
| G11 | Lonestars SC | Hammarby IF FF | 2-0 |
| GSOT 1 | Olympique de Grande Synthe section adaptée | Skalborg SK Parasport | 4-1 |
| GSOT 2 | FIFH | Trollenäs IF | 2-0 |
| GSOT 3 | Special Olympics Devils Devils | Hannover 1896 | 5-0 |
| GSOT 4 | Special Olympics HK, HK | Bremer Fußball-Verband | 2-3 |

== See also ==
- List of sporting events in Sweden
