= Harry Twite =

Bermudian footballer (born 2003)

Personal information
- Full name: Harry Mark Twite
- Date of birth: 17 June 2005 (age 21)
- Place of birth: Paget Parish, Bermuda
- Height: 1.90 m (6 ft 3 in)
- Position: Centre-back

Team information
- Current team: Loughborough University

Youth career
- Warwick Academy

Senior career*
Years	Team	Apps	(Gls)
2023–2024	King's Lynn Town	1	(0)
2023–2024	→Wisbech Town (loan)	18	(1)
2024–	Loughborough University	15	(0)

International career^{‡}
2024	Bermuda U20	3	(0)
2023–	Bermuda	28	(0)
- * Club domestic league appearances and goals as of 23:07, 2 November 2025 (UTC) ‡ National team caps and goals as of 23:07, 2 November 2025 (UTC)

Harry Mark Twite (born 17 June 2005) is a Bermudian professional footballer who plays as a centre-back for the Northern Premier League side Loughborough Students and the Bermuda national team.

== Career ==
On 24 August 2023, Twite signed with the English club King's Lynn Town after a successful trial. On 7 November 2023, he joined Wisbech Town on loan. In 2024, he joined the Northern Premier League side Loughborough Students.

== International career ==
Twite started playing for the senior Bermuda national team in 2023. In February 2024, he was named captain for the Bermuda U20s for a set of 2024 CONCACAF U-20 Championship qualifying matches.

== Personal life ==
Twite was a ball-boy for the Bermuda national team when they achieved their historic qualification to the 2019 CONCACAF Gold Cup. He was completing his A-levels at Warwick Academy when he was first called up to the national team. He was considered for the Bermuda under-20 rugby sevens team, but was unable to attend due to a call-up to a set of 2026 FIFA World Cup qualification matches.
