= Farm team =

Sports club whose role is to provide experience and training for young players

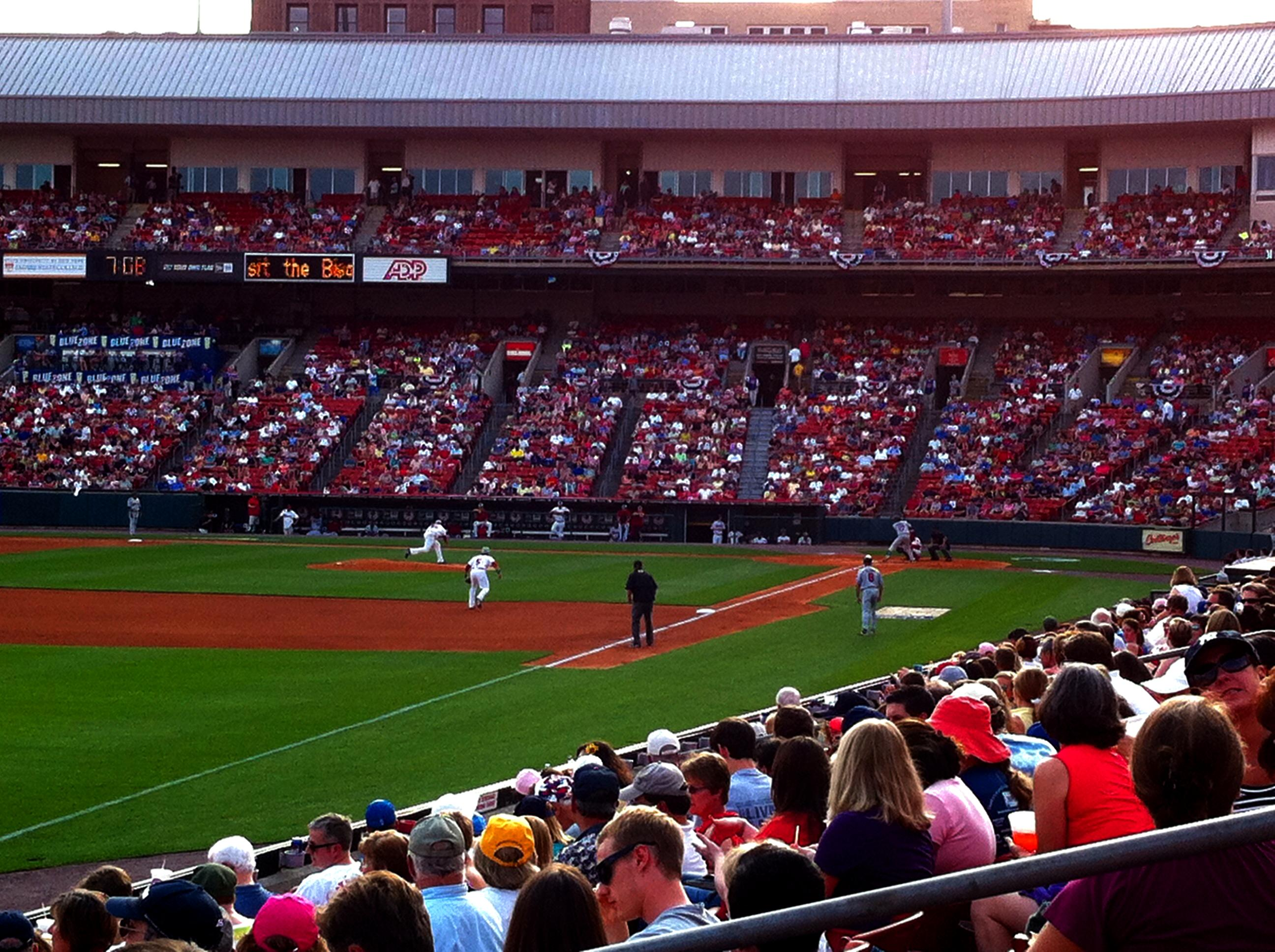
The Buffalo Bisons are a farm team of the Toronto Blue Jays.

In sports, a farm team (also referred to as farm system, developmental system, feeder team, feeder club or nursery club) is generally a team or club whose role is to provide experience and training for young players, with an agreement that any successful players can move on to a higher level at a given point, usually in an association with a major-level parent team. This system can be implemented in many ways, both formally and informally. It is not to be confused with a practice squad, which fulfills a similar developmental purpose but the players on the practice squad are members of the parent team.

== Contracted farm teams ==
=== Baseball ===
In the United States and Canada, Minor League Baseball teams operate under strict franchise contracts with their major league counterparts. Although the vast majority of such teams are privately owned and are therefore able to switch affiliation, those players under contract with the affiliated Major League Baseball team are under their exclusive control, and would move to the MLB club's new affiliate. Not all players on a minor league team are under contract with the MLB club; however, the parent club has the exclusive right to "purchase" the contract of a non-contract player at its affiliate.

Minor league teams are usually based in smaller cities (although the New York Mets have a low-level minor-league affiliate actually based elsewhere within New York City), and players who are contracted to them, as opposed to major league players sent down to this level for rehabilitation or other professional-development assignments, are typically paid significantly less than their Major League counterparts.

Most major league players start off their careers by working their way up the minor league system, from the lowest (rookie) to the highest (AAA) classification, with the rare exceptions usually being those players signed from Japan's Nippon Professional Baseball. Since the elimination of the bonus rule, only a very small number of amateur players have gone directly into MLB, including John Olerud, Jim Abbott, and Dave Winfield. The process of a player working his way up through the minor leagues is formally referred to by most MLB teams as "player development". However, minor league affiliates are often informally referred to as "farm teams" and a major league player's misfortune of being sent back to the minors is sometimes described as being "farmed out".

The farm system as it is recognized today was invented by Branch Rickey, who – as field manager, general manager, and club president – helped to build the St. Louis Cardinals dynasty during the 1920s, 1930s, and 1940s. When Rickey joined the team in 1917, players were commonly purchased by major league teams from independent, high-level minor league clubs.

Rickey, a keen judge of talent, became frustrated when players at the A and AA levels he had agreed to purchase were instead offered for bid and sold by those independent clubs to wealthier rivals. With the support of Cardinal owner Sam Breadon, Rickey devised a plan whereby St. Louis would buy and control its own minor league teams from Class D to Class AA (the highest level at the time), thus allowing them to promote or demote players as they developed, and "grow" their own talent.

The talent pipeline began at tryout camps that St. Louis scouts conducted throughout the U.S. "From quantity comes quality," Rickey once observed, and, during the 1930s, with as many as 40 owned or affiliated farm teams, the Cardinals controlled the destinies of hundreds of players each year. (The reserve clause then bound players to their teams in perpetuity.)

The Cardinals won nine National League pennants and six World Series championships between 1926 and 1946, proving the effectiveness of the farm system concept. Indeed, the second club to fully embrace such a system, the New York Yankees, used it to sustain their dynasty from the mid-1930s through the middle of the 1960s. When Rickey moved to the Brooklyn Dodgers as president and general manager in 1943, he built a hugely successful farm system there as well after the end of World War II. The teams that ignored the farm system in the 1930s and early 1940s (such as the Philadelphia A's and Phillies and the Washington Senators) found themselves falling on hard times.

The existence of the minor league system is due in part to MLB's ability to include a reserve clause in its contracts with minor league players, which gives the major league team exclusive rights to a player even after the contract has expired. In a landmark 1922 Supreme Court decision, Federal Baseball Club v. National League, baseball was granted a special immunity from antitrust laws. Despite the advent of free agency in 1976, which led many to predict the demise of the farm system, it still remains a strong component of a winning baseball strategy. Under the current minor league system (since the last reorganization in 2021), each of the thirty major league teams has four affiliated minor league teams.

=== Ice hockey ===
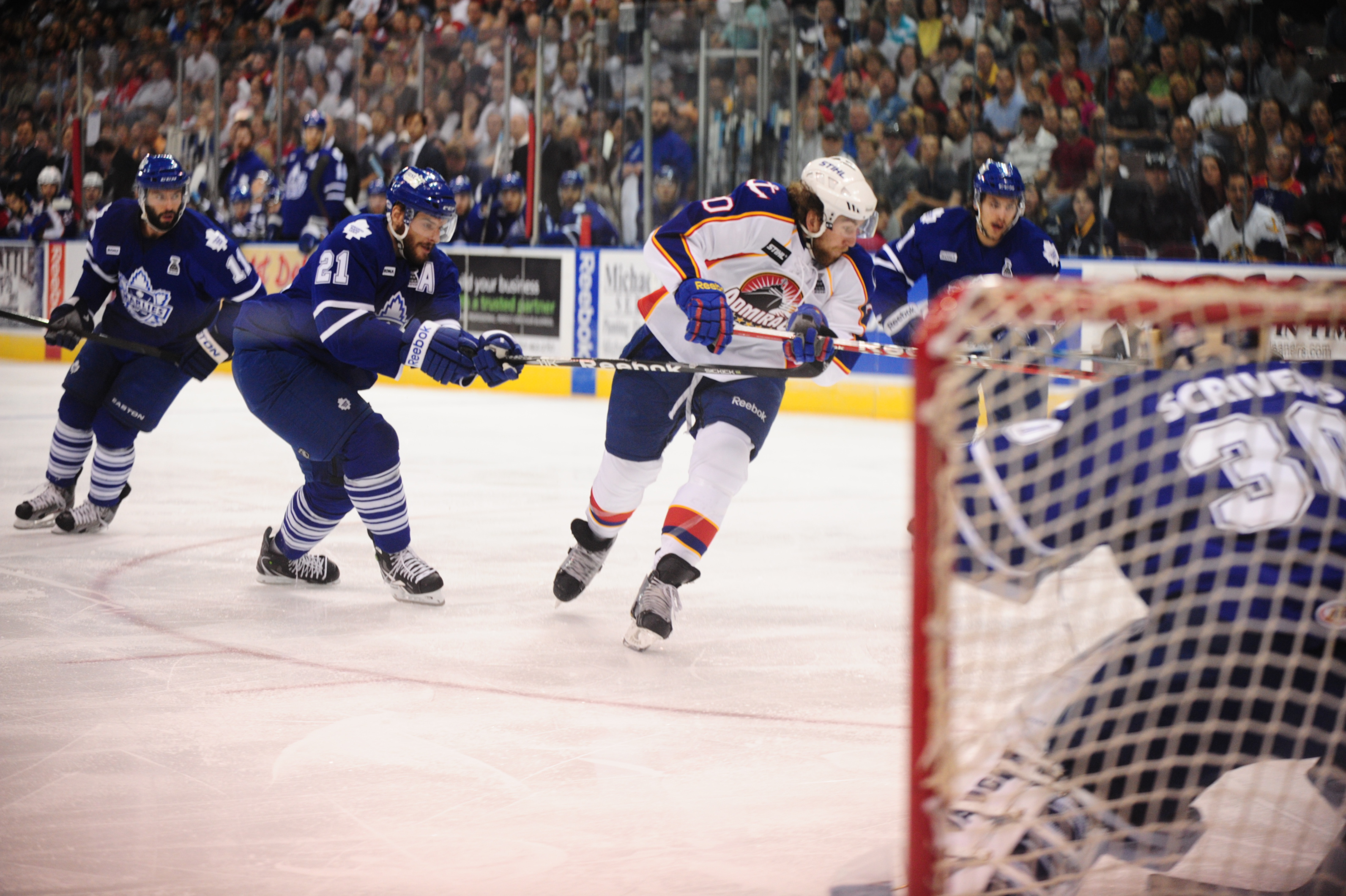
A game between two American Hockey League teams. AHL teams are affiliated with a National Hockey League franchise and serve as their farm teams.

The teams of the National Hockey League also have their own farm teams in the American Hockey League (AHL). For example, the Cleveland Monsters are the farm team for the Columbus Blue Jackets. Additionally, NHL teams have affiliates in the ECHL, although the terms of the most recent CBA (expired in 2012) prohibited ECHL players from being recalled to the NHL or being sent down to that league without being assigned to the AHL first; thus, ECHL teams are de facto affiliated to their respective NHL-partner's farm team in the AHL. Although some NHL franchises own their AHL and/or ECHL affiliates, many AHL and ECHL franchises are independently owned, with ties to NHL franchises made through affiliation contracts.

Unlike baseball, not all the players on the rosters of the minor league teams are owned by an NHL team. The AHL system recognizes two types of contracts: the two-way contract (generally the most common among NHL prospects), in which players can be sent back and forth between the NHL and AHL at will, and the standard contract, which binds the player to the AHL. The NHL teams have negotiating rights to AHL players on their farm clubs' rosters and can upgrade a player to a two-way contract if they so desire. Players can also be sent down to the AHL via the waivers system; if a player is not claimed by any team when placed on waivers, he is by default assigned to his previous team's AHL club.

== Association football ==
=== Internal feeder teams ===
In many clubs, there will be internal feeder teams. These may be age-restricted teams, such as an "Under-18s" team, or an "A team". For example, in international association football, national teams also operate youth sides—see England national under-21 football team, for example.

In the United States, some Major League Soccer teams previously had reserve teams in the MLS Reserve League. Later, all teams were nominally required to field a reserve team or an affiliate in a professional league operated by the United Soccer League—either the USL Championship, which occupies the second tier of the United States soccer league system, or USL League One, one of two leagues that then shared third-tier status. This requirement was never strictly enforced. In 2022, MLS will relaunch its reserve league as MLS Next Pro, which occupies the third level alongside USL League One and the National Independent Soccer Association. The first Next Pro season will feature 21 teams, all but one of which are MLS reserve sides, with most having been withdrawn from the USL system in advance of the establishment of the new league. All remaining MLS reserve sides will be withdrawn from the USL system after the 2022 season to join Next Pro.

In many sports, these feeder teams will compete in their own leagues, though in some cases they compete with other "full teams" at a lower level.

In some countries, such as New Zealand, major teams are organised as regional franchises, and local club sides within these regions become automatic feeder clubs for these regional teams.

=== Domestic and cross-border agreements ===
It is also becoming more common for football clubs to arrange formal deals with other clubs with which they originally had no connection. The feeder/parent club connection could have many functions, and be very beneficial both for the feeder and the parent club. For bigger clubs, it is common to arrange agreements with the minor clubs in the area. The smaller teams can provide the bigger team (the parent club) with young talents, and the mother club have an opportunity to send their young players away on loan to these teams ("to farm out").

In addition to local connection, it is increasingly commonplace for teams to have feeder clubs in other regions of the country or in other nations, in order to gain further knowledge. Prominent European clubs are often making intercontinental deals with other clubs for the same reason. AFC Ajax have for instance a connection with the South African team Ajax Cape Town, Manchester United have a connection with the Australian team Wollongong Wolves and the Belgian team Royal Antwerp, and Lithuanian side FBK Kaunas have loaned many of their younger players out to their Scottish parent team Heart of Midlothian in the hope of securing them a deal at a bigger club in the future. Having a feeder club in wealthy countries, where football is gaining a gradually better reputation, has also proved to be very beneficial. Countries such as the United States, Canada, Japan, China and South Korea are good examples. Alternatively, some clubs within the European Union have used feeder teams to sign non-EU players and then naturalize them in an EU country, to overcome visa regulations, for example English team Liverpool F.C. has an agreement with Belgian side KRC Genk.

== League-owned farm leagues ==
=== American football ===
The National Football League is the only one of the four major professional sports leagues in North America that does not currently have a farm system, although the 2024 incarnation of the United Football League is making strides to fill the niche of a minor league. Many players from the UFL have made the jump from UFL to the NFL, including A.J. McCarron, Ben DiNucci and Hakeem Butler have made the leap from the UFL's predecessors XFL and the USFL. Save for a few UFL players, nearly all of the NFL's players are drafted from the National Collegiate Athletic Association (NCAA), which operates on a scholarship system which prohibits the payment of cash, but since 2021 also with the Name, Image, & Likeness (NIL) system following the Supreme Court's decision in NCAA v. Alston, students are now allowed to profit off of their own name, image, and likeness. The scholarship system provides student-athletes with free college education, room and board for up to five years. The relation between college football and the NFL is a result of the development of the game of American football, which (unlike other sports, which were primarily independent club activities) was cultivated at colleges and universities. As a result, players entering the professional football system are generally several years older and more physically mature than first-time professional athletes in other sports, thus reducing the need for a farm system.

In the 1930s, the Chicago Bears and New York Giants owned teams in the American Association, which became the first true minor league in professional football, and later attempted to organize development or farm system with the formation of the Association of Professional Football Leagues, but the agreement lasted less than two years, and was terminated in 1947.

In the 1960s and 1970s, several NFL teams had independent agreements with other leagues such as the Atlantic Coast Football League, Midwest Football League, North Pacific Football League, Professional Football League of America and Midwest Professional Football League, to use their teams as farm teams, though they were not owned by the NFL owners, but all of those arrangements ended after the 1972 season. The most recent official minor league, NFL Europe, was different from most other farm teams in that all prospects were pooled and dispersed among the six European teams, instead of having teams assigned to each other.

Many players in the Arena Football League (among other indoor American football leagues) later advance to the NFL - with more than 100 players which played in both leagues, but no farming contracts exist among any teams, in part because the National Football League Players Association opposes the idea of an affiliated farm system on the grounds that its players would be at risk of unnecessary injury. During the mid-2000s, several NFL owners at least partially owned arena football teams, such as Jerry Jones (Dallas), Arthur Blank (Atlanta), Bud Adams (Tennessee), Tom Benson (New Orleans), and Pat Bowlen (Denver), but very rarely did they ever promote or demote any players between the AFL and NFL, due in part to significant differences in the playing schedules and the style of play between outdoor and indoor football. On February 8, 1999, the NFL also purchased, but never exercised, an option to buy a major interest in the AFL. All of the NFL owners backed out of the league when it went bankrupt, was sold off and reorganized. The Arena Football League had its own developmental league known as the af2 from 2000 to 2009.

In the 2020 incarnation of the XFL, the league established a hybrid between a practice squad and a farm team, what it dubbed "Team 9" operated with the same autonomy as the other eight teams, with its own roster and coaching staff, Team 9 will not play any on-the-record games and will serve as a pool of potential players for the other eight teams to call up in the event of injury. A similar system was used by NFL Europe. In the 2023 incarnation they signed a player personnel partnership with the Indoor Football League (IFL), with the IFL functioning as the XFL's de facto minor league.

In Canada, intercollegiate sport has never attained a similar level of following compared to the United States, mainly due to ice hockey being the most popular sport in the country. In hockey, the National Hockey League has historically overlooked intercollegiate sport in favour of other player development models. Nevertheless, the Canadian Football League has established itself as a niche league despite collecting only a fraction of the revenues commanded by the NFL. To recruit talented players, the league to a large extent relies on maintaining rules that are similar enough to American football so as to allow talented NCAA-trained players a reasonable prospect of adapting and being successful in the CFL, while retaining significant enough differences so as to ensure that the league is largely not in competition with the NFL for exactly the same type of players. In addition, to maintain the league's distinct Canadian identity, the league enforces a strict quota of Canadian players that must be on the rosters of all CFL teams.

=== Basketball ===
Traditionally, the NBA did not have a formal farm league, though unofficially, the Continental Basketball Association served as an NBA feeder league on and off through its existence. It mainly relies on the elite NCAA to produce NBA players, and thus the latter was often known as the "feeders". Since 2001, the NBA directly owns an entire farm league: the NBA G League (formerly the NBA D-League). The NBA G League started with eight teams in the fall of 2001. In March 2005, NBA commissioner David Stern announced a plan to expand the league to fifteen teams and develop it into a true minor league farm system, with each team affiliated with one or more NBA teams. Although the system has been run for a few years, most of the rookies in the NBA are still drafted out from NCAA. At the conclusion of the 2008–09 NBA season, 20 percent of NBA players had spent time in the NBA D-League. By the end of the 2016–17 season, 44% of players in the 2017 NBA playoffs had some experience in the D-League. The league signed a branding agreement with Gatorade in 2017 to become the NBA G League.

== Independent teams ==
Some sports allow the operation of independent feeder teams. In professional cycling, for example, feeder teams such as Vendée U and Trek Livestrong, act as feeders for Bouygues Télécom and Team RadioShack respectively, and compete at levels below the UCI ProTour. Most pro-cycling teams use this format.

Such agreements may be less formal; in English football, for example, the operation of an external feeder team is prohibited. However, casual relationships may exist between teams to allow a sharing of larger clubs' resources with smaller clubs, in return for the smaller teams taking young players on loan. This allows both clubs to maintain separate identities, and to exit from the arrangement if necessary. Such an agreement exists between Preston North End and Holker Old Boys, for example . Alternatively, clubs may use teams playing abroad, particularly if they want to follow the progress of players who they cannot sign due to work permit regulations. Please see List of feeder teams in football for a comprehensive list.

In North American baseball, several independent leagues exist outside of the control of Minor League Baseball or Major League Baseball and without any formal developmental agreements, but may still exist as informal places for talent to develop.

== Professional wrestling ==
Professional wrestling utilizes a farm system that allows inexperienced wrestlers to develop their skills and gain in ring experience in smaller, often regional promotions before they are called up to compete in front of a global/national audience. These are generally called "farm leagues" or "developmental territories".

Some of the more notable ones for WWE include World Wrestling Alliance (1998); Power Pro Wrestling (1998–2000); International Wrestling Association (1999–2001); Memphis Championship Wrestling (2000–2001); Deep South Wrestling (2005–2007); Heartland Wrestling Association (2001–2003), which was also a developmental territory for World Championship Wrestling; Ohio Valley Wrestling (2000–2008 for WWE; 2011–2013 and 2019–present for Impact Wrestling); and Florida Championship Wrestling (2007–2012).

In 2012, WWE would relaunch and repurpose NXT—a reality competition series featuring FCW talent being mentored by WWE "pros"—as an in-house developmental brand, with its weekly television program switching to a more traditional format, and the brand also hosting various live events, and also spawning a UK branch. During this period, NXT received critical acclaim for the quality of its matches and storylines, to the point that WWE began to promote it as a de facto third flagship brand, and moved its television series from the streaming WWE Network to USA Network to counterprogram the upstart All Elite Wrestling. However, in 2021, WWE moved NXT back to a different night, and later re-launched the series and brand to return to a development-oriented positioning.

== Formula One ==
Formula One teams often use the most promising drivers from divisions such as the current Formula Two championship, the former GP2 and Formula Two championships, with the majority of the current Formula Two's champions graduating to F1. Ten drivers on the grid for 2011 had previously raced in GP2.

Racing Bulls (also VCARB; formerly Scuderia Toro Rosso, then Scuderia AlphaTauri) also serves as a sort of farm team for Red Bull Racing. Both are owned by Austrian beverage company Red Bull, with VCARB helping to develop cars and drivers for Red Bull Racing. Four-time world champion Sebastian Vettel drove for Toro Rosso from 2007 to 2008 before moving to Red Bull in 2009, replacing the retiring David Coulthard. Since the 2014 season, every Red Bull driver had previously been on the RB team, with the exception of Sergio Pérez.

== NASCAR ==
NASCAR, the principal body for stock car racing in North America, has an extensive system of developmental series, with the ultimate goal for drivers being a ride in the top-level NASCAR Cup Series. Most Cup Series teams are involved in at least one of NASCAR's two other national series, either running vehicles in the junior series or affiliating with teams that run exclusively in those series:

- The second-level Xfinity Series is the main proving ground for potential Cup drivers, crew chiefs, engineers, and pit crew members. Most races are run on the same weekends, and at the same tracks, as Cup Series races, and Xfinity cars are largely similar to Cup cars (though with some differences, most notably less powerful engines).
- The third-level Craftsman Truck Series is a pickup truck-based series. Most races are held in conjunction with Xfinity Series races, with many also serving as support events for Cup Series races. Relatively few drivers or engineers jump directly from the Truck Series to the Cup Series; most spend at least some time in the Xfinity Series first.

Below the three national series are multiple regional series. Cup Series teams generally do not participate at these levels, but extensively scout them for future talent.

- The ARCA Menards Series is a semi-professional stock car series run by the Automobile Racing Club of America (ARCA), which was acquired by NASCAR in 2018. The series runs on a variety of tracks, including tracks that host events in NASCAR's three national series. Even prior to the acquisition, the ARCA Racing Series has had a long-standing relationship with NASCAR as a farm system; its vehicles are based on previous-generation Cup cars, with teams often purchasing chassis and engines that had previously been used by Cup Series teams. The series continued to use the previous "Generation 4" chassis used by the Cup Series until 2016, when the series began to phase in a new composite body based on NASCAR's now-former Generation 6 chassis.
- The ARCA Menards Series East and ARCA Menards Series West, which use stock cars with full fenders similar to those in the Cup and Xfinity Series. The series was previously operated under the NASCAR banner until 2020, when it was moved under ARCA.
- The Whelen Modified Tour, operating mostly in the Northeast U.S., races open-wheeled cars with bodies similar to those of other NASCAR cars.
- The NASCAR Canada Series in Canada and NASCAR Mexico Series in Mexico are national series in the respective countries, also using stock cars with full fenders. A few drivers from the Canada Series have moved to one of the U.S. national series.

The entry level of NASCAR-sanctioned racing is the Whelen All-American Series, a championship for drivers who compete in weekly races at small tracks, often dirt tracks, throughout the U.S. and Canada. Regional champions and an overall series champion are crowned.

== Indoor soccer ==
The Premier Arena Soccer League is a farm system for the Major Arena Soccer League.

== See also ==
- Cantera
- List of feeder teams in football
- Tanglewood Boys
- Youth team
- Youth system
