= Dembo Saidykhan =

Gambian footballer

Personal information
- Date of birth: 20 January 2004 (age 22)
- Place of birth: Bakau, Gambia
- Height: 6 ft 1 in (1.85 m)
- Position: Defender

Senior career*
Years	Team	Apps	(Gls)
- Steve Biko FC
2024–2025	Whitecaps FC 2	23	(1)
2024	→ Whitecaps FC Academy	1	(0)

International career^{‡}
2023–	Gambia U20	6	(0)
- * Club domestic league appearances and goals as of 6 October 2025 ‡ National team caps and goals as of 1 June 2023

Dembo Saidykhan (born 20 January 2004) is a Gambian footballer.

== Club career ==
Saidykhan began his senior career with Steve Biko FC in the GFA League First Division.

In August 2023, he agreed to sign with Whitecaps FC 2 in MLS Next Pro. He signed with the Whitecaps, despite interest from Scottish club Rangers, French club Toulouse, Danish club FC Nordsjaelland, and English club Southampton. He officially signed his contract for the 2024 season in November 2023, departing Gambia for Canada at that time. He scored his first professional goal on June 23, 2024, scoring the winning goal in a 3-2 victory over Ventura County FC. In December 2024, he re-signed with the team for the 2025 season.

== International career ==
Saidykhan represented the Gambia U20 at the 2023 U-20 Africa Cup of Nations and 2023 FIFA U-20 World Cup, where he helped them reach the Round of 16.

In June 2024, he was called up to the Gambia senior national team for the first time for 2026 FIFA World Cup qualification matches.
