= WAFU Zone B U-20 Championship =

Association football tournament

- Zone A Zone B
- Founded: 2018
- Region: International (CAF)
- Current champions: Nigeria (1st title)
- Most championships: Senegal Ghana (1 title each)
- Website: wafuonline.com
- 2020 WAFU Zone B U-20 Tournament

The WAFU Zone B U-20 Championship is an association football tournament that is contested between competition contested by national teams of Zone B of the West African Football Union.The current champions are Nigeria.

== Eligible participants ==
- Niger
- Nigeria
- Togo
- Ghana
- Benin
- Burkina Faso
- Ivory Coast
- Senegal

== Inaugural Tournament (2018) ==
Eight teams were drawn in two groups of four. WAFU Zone B member teams were Ivory Coast, Niger, Burkina Faso, Ghana, Nigeria and Benin. Mali (from Zone A) replaced Côte d'Ivoire, who had withdrawn before the tournament, and Senegal (from Zone A) were invited to make the numbers up to eight. The tournament was won by Senegal after defeating Nigeria in the final.

== Previous Tournaments ==
Year	Host	Final			Third Place Match
Year	Host	Winner	Score	Runner-up	3rd Place	Score	4th Place
2018; Details	Togo	Senegal	2 - 0	Nigeria	Mali	2 - 1	Niger
2020; Details	Togo	Ghana	2 - 1	Burkina Faso	Ivory Coast	2 - 0	Niger
2023; Details	Ivory Coast	Ivory Coast	2 - 1	Burkina Faso	Benin	2 - 0	Togo

== See also ==
- WAFU Zone A U-20 Tournament
- WAFU U-20 Championship
