= Oumar Diouf =

Senegalese footballer (born 2003)

Personal information
- Date of birth: 15 March 2003 (age 23)
- Place of birth: Dakar, Senegal
- Height: 1.80 m (5 ft 11 in)
- Position: Forward

Team information
- Current team: STVV
- Number: 77

Youth career
- EF Kalèle
- 2018–2023: AF Darou Salam

Senior career*
| Years | Team | Apps | (Gls) |
| 2023–2024 | Çaykur Rizespor | 3 | (0) |
| 2024–2025 | Gençlik Gücü | 28 | (19) |
| 2025–2026 | Liège | 18 | (8) |
| 2026– | STVV | 16 | (3) |

International career^{‡}
| 2019–2023 | Senegal U20 | 7 | (1) |
- * Club domestic league appearances and goals as of 31 May 2026 ‡ National team caps and goals as of 13:25, 27 October 2025 (UTC)

Oumar Diouf (born 13 March 2003) is a Senegalese professional football player who plays as a forward for Belgian Pro League club STVV.

== Club career ==
Diouf is a product of the youth academies of the Senegalese clubs EF Kalèle and AF Darou Salam. On 11 August 2023, he transferred to the Turkish Süper Lig club Çaykur Rizespor on a 4-year contract. He suffered an complicated injury while at Rizespor which cut his opportunities short. In 2024, he moved to the Turkish-Cypriot club Gençlik Gücü in the KTFF Süper Lig. On 3 August 2025 he transferred to the Challenger Pro League club Liège on a 2+1 year contract. On 20 January 2026, he moved to the Belgian Pro League club STVV.

== International career ==
In 2019, Diouf played for the Senegal U20s that won the 2019 WAFU U-20 Tournament. He also made the U20 squad for the 2023 FIFA U-20 World Cup.

== Honours ==
Senegal U20

- WAFU U-20 Tournament: 2019
