= Gambia national under-20 football team =

National under-20 association football team representing Gambia

Gambia U-20
- Nickname: The Young Scorpions
- Association: Gambia Football Federation
- Confederation: CAF (Africa)
- Head coach: (The Gambia) Abdoulie Bojang
- Captain: Alagie Saine
- FIFA code: GAM
First colours	Second colours

U-20 Africa Cup of Nations
- Appearances: 4 (first in 2007)
- Best result: Runners-up (2023)

WAFU Zone A U-20 Championship
- Appearances: 4 (first in 2018)
- Best result: Champions (2018, 2020)

FIFA U-20 World Cup
- Appearances: 2 (first in 2007)
- Best result: Round of 16 (2007, 2023)

The Gambia national under-20 football team is the U-20 football team of the Gambia and is controlled by the Gambia Football Federation. It serves as the youth team and feeder team of the Gambia national football team. They are nicknamed The Young Scorpions.

== Home stadium ==
Independence Stadium is a multi-purpose stadium in Bakau, Gambia. It is currently used mostly for football matches, although it is also used for music concerts, political events, trade fairs and national celebrations. The stadium holds 30,000 people.

== Honours ==
- African Youth Championship:
  - Silver Medalists (1): 2023
  - Bronze Medalists (2): 2007, 2021
- WAFU Zone A U-20 Tournament:
  - Winners (2): 2018, 2020
  - Silver Medalists (1): 2022
  - Bronze Medalists (1): 2019

== Current squad ==
The following players were named in the squad for the 2023 FIFA U-20 World Cup, to be played in May-June 2023.

Caps and goals correct as of 1 June 2023, after the match against Uruguay.

No.	Pos.	Player	Date of birth (age)	Caps	Goals	Club
1	GK	Pa Ebou Dampha	29 March 2003 (age 23)	8	0	(Senegalese Football Federation) AJEL de Rufisque
17	GK	Youkasseh Sanyang	27 June 2004 (age 21)	2	0	(Gambia Football Federation) Steve Biko
18	GK	Ebrima Jaiteh	19 December 2004 (age 21)	0	0	(Angolan Football Federation) Luanda City
4	DF	Alagie Saine	20 January 2003 (age 23)	13	2	(Danish Football Association) Horsens
16	DF	Bakary Jawara	2 April 2003 (age 23)	11	0	(Gambia Football Federation) Fortune
3	DF	Sainey Sanyang	18 April 2003 (age 23)	10	0	(Bulgarian Football Union) CSKA Sofia
15	DF	Moses Jarju	5 October 2003 (age 22)	6	1	(Ukrainian Association of Football) Chornomorets Odesa
5	DF	Dembo Saidykhan	20 January 2004 (age 22)	6	0	(Canadian Soccer Association) Whitecaps 2
6	MF	Mahmudu Bajo	15 August 2004 (age 21)	9	1	(Slovak Football Association) FC DAC 1904
13	MF	Haruna Rasid Njie	23 September 2005 (age 20)	8	0	(Latvian Football Federation) RFS
14	MF	Muhammed Sawaneh	30 December 2003 (age 22)	8	0	(Egyptian Football Association) ZED
7	MF	Bailo Bah	4 March 2004 (age 22)	4	0	(Gambia Football Federation) Hawks
12	MF	Muhammed Jobe	26 May 2004 (age 22)	2	0	(Gambia Football Federation) Real de Banjul
10	FW	Kajally Drammeh	10 October 2003 (age 22)	13	2	(Football Federation of Armenia) FC Van
20	FW	Adama Bojang	28 May 2004 (age 22)	10	6	(Swiss Football Association) Grasshopper
2	FW	Ba Lamin Sowe	1 December 2003 (age 22)	10	0	(Royal Spanish Football Federation) Tenerife C
11	FW	Modou Lamin Marong	27 November 2005 (age 20)	9	0	(Angolan Football Federation) Interclube
21	FW	Mamin Sanyang	6 February 2003 (age 23)	8	1	(Polish Football Association) GKS Tychy
9	FW	Mansour Mbye	1 January 2003 (age 23)	8	0	(Gambia Football Federation) Banjul United
19	FW	Ebrima Singhateh	10 September 2003 (age 22)	7	0	(Football Association of the Czech Republic) MFK Karviná
8	FW	Salifu Colley	13 October 2003 (age 22)	6	0	(South African Football Association) Stellenbosch

== Head-to-head record ==
The following table shows Gambia's head-to-head record in the FIFA U-20 World Cup.

Opponent	Pld	W	D	L	GF	GA	GD	Win %
Austria	1	0	0	1	1	2	−1	0.00
France	1	1	0	0	2	1	+1	100.00
Honduras	1	1	0	0	2	1	+1	100.00
Mexico	1	0	0	1	0	3	−3	0.00
New Zealand	1	1	0	0	1	0	+1	100.00
Portugal	1	1	0	0	2	1	+1	100.00
South Korea	1	0	1	0	0	0	+0	0.00
Uruguay	1	0	0	1	0	1	−1	0.00
Total	8	4	1	3	8	9	−1	50.00

== See also ==
- Gambia national football team
- Gambia women's national football team
