= WAFU U-20 Championship =

- Founded: 2008
- Region: International (CAF)
- Current champions: Gambia (2 titles) WAFU Zone A Ghana (2 titles); WAFU Zone B
- Most championships: Gambia (2 titles) WAFU Zone A Ghana (2 titles); WAFU Zone B
- Website: wafuonline.com
- 2021 Africa U-20 Cup of Nations qualification

The WAFU U-20 Championship is an association football tournament that is contested between West African nations. It was funded by The Economic Community Of West African States.

== Eligible participants ==
- Benin
- Burkina Faso
- Cape Verde
- Ivory Coast
- Ghana
- Guinea
- Guinea-Bissau
- Liberia
- Mali
- Mauritania
- Niger
- Nigeria
- Senegal
- Sierra Leone
- Gambia
- Togo

== 2018 edition ==
In 2018, the WAFU Championship was relaunched and the championship was placed in two different tournaments based on the zones.

== WAFU Zones (A&B) ==
Country	Zone	Governing body
Cape Verde	Zone A	Cape Verdean Football Federation
Gambia	Zone A	Gambia Football Association
Guinea	Zone A	Guinean Football Federation
Guinea-Bissau	Zone A	Football Federation of Guinea-Bissau
Liberia	Zone A	Liberia Football Association
Mali	Zone A	Malian Football Federation
Mauritania	Zone A	Football Federation of the Islamic Republic of Mauritania
Senegal	Zone A	Senegalese Football Federation
Sierra Leone	Zone A	Sierra Leone Football Association
Benin	Zone B	Benin Football Federation
Burkina Faso	Zone B	Burkinabé Football Federation
Ghana	Zone B	Ghana Football Association
Ivory Coast	Zone B	Ivorian Football Federation
Niger	Zone B	Nigerien Football Federation
Nigeria	Zone B	Nigeria Football Federation
Togo	Zone B	Togolese Football Federation

== Tournaments ==
Year	Host	Final			Third Place Match
Year	Host	Winner	Score	Runner-up	3rd Place	Score	4th Place
2008; Details	Nigeria	Ghana	1 – 1 aet (3–2 pen)	Senegal	Ivory Coast	2 – 0	Burkina Faso

== See also ==
- WAFU Zone B U-20 Tournament
- WAFU Zone A U-20 Tournament
