= 2019 WAFU U-20 Tournament =

Tournament details
- Host country: Guinea
- Dates: 24 November – 8 December 2019
- Teams: 7
- Venue: 2 (in 1 host city)

Final positions
- Champions: Senegal (1st title)
- Runners-up: Mali
- Third place: Gambia
- Fourth place: Sierra Leone

The 2019 WAFU U-20 Tournament was the second edition of the international U-20 men's football event for teams under the West African Football Union. The competition was hosted by Guinea from November to December 2019 in two match venues.

Host Guinea, Mauritania, Senegal, and Sierra Leone make up Group A while Liberia, Mali, and Gambia complete Group B (as Guinea-Bissau withdrew).

Matches were held at Stade du 28 Septembre and the Nongo Stadium, both in Conakry, Guinea.

== Participants ==
Group A

- Guinea
- Senegal
- Mauritania
- Sierra Leone

Group B

- Mali
- Gambia
- Liberia

== Officials ==
Referees

- Younoussa Tawel Camara (Guinea)
- (The Gambia) Lamin Jammeh (Gambia)
- Reinaldo Domingos Barbosa (Guinea-Bissau)
- Raphiou Ligali (Benin)
- Hassan Corneh (Liberia)
- Y. G. Mawabwè Bodjona (Togo)
- Alioune Sandigui (Senegal)

Assistant Referees

- Mustapha Bojang (Guinea)
- Yamoussa Sillah (Guinea)
- Amadou Ngom (Senegal)
- Abdulmajeed Olaide (Nigeria)
- Nouhoum Bamba (Mali)
- Soufia Abdou Garba (Niger)
- Joel Wanka Doe (Liberia)
- Musa Alieu Sandy (Sierra Leone)
- Kalidou Delba Ba (Mauritania)

== Player eligibility ==
Players born 1 January 1999 or later are eligible to participate in the competition.

== Group stage ==
The top two teams of each group advance to the semi-finals.

Tiebreakers

Teams are ranked according to points (3 points for a win, 1 point for a draw, 0 points for a loss), and if tied on points, the following tie-breaking criteria are applied, in the order given, to determine the rankings.

1. Points in head-to-head matches among tied teams;
2. Goal difference in all group matches;
3. Goals scored in all group matches;
4. Disciplinary points (yellow card = 1 point, red card as a result of two yellow cards = 3 points, direct red card = 3 points, yellow card followed by direct red card = 4 points);
5. Drawing of lots.
6. If, after applying criteria 1 to 3 to several teams, more than two teams still have an equal ranking, criteria 1 to 3 are reapplied exclusively to the matches between the two teams in question to determine their final rankings. If this procedure does not lead to a decision, criteria 7 to 9 apply;
7. Points in head-to-head matches among tied teams;
8. Goal difference in matches between the teams concerned;
9. The greatest number of goals scored in the matches between the teams concerned.

All times are local UTC±00:00.

=== Group A ===
Pos	Team	Pld	W	D	L	GF	GA	GD	Pts	Qualification
1	Sierra Leone	3	2	0	1	7	7	0	6	Knockout stage
2	Senegal	3	1	2	0	5	2	+3	5	Knockout stage
3	Guinea (H)	3	1	1	1	4	3	+1	4	
4	Mauritania	3	0	1	2	2	6	−4	1	

First match(es) will be played: 2019. Source: WAFU
Rules for classification: Group stage tiebreakers
(H) Hosts
24 November 2019
16:00

Guinea	2–0	Mauritania
Bah 2' (pen.); Camara 65'	Report

General Lansana Conté Stadium, Conakry
Referee: Raphiou Ligali (Benin)
24 November 2019
19:00

Senegal	4–1	Sierra Leone
Sarr 8', 47', 68'; Gueye 63'	Report	Kalokoh 90+3pen.'

General Lansana Conté Stadium, Conakry
Referee: Hassan Corneh (Liberia)

26 November 2019
19:00

Sierra Leone	3–1	Mauritania
Kalokoh 52' (pen.), 63' (pen.), 78'	Report	Chighaly 26'

Stade du 28 Septembre, Conakry
Referee: (The Gambia) Lamin Jammeh (Gambia)
27 November 2019
16:00

Guinea	0–0	Senegal
	Report

Stade du 28 Septembre, Conakry
Referee: Y. G. Mawabwè Bodjona (Togo)

29 November 2019
16:00

Guinea	2–3	Sierra Leone
Sylla 16'; Sory Cissoko 68'	Report	Sesay 19'; Kalokoh 22', 79'

Stade du 28 Septembre, Conakry
Referee: Raphiou Ligali (Benin)
29 November 2019
16:00

Senegal	1–1	Mauritania
Diouf 46'		Chighaly 24'

General Lansana Conté Stadium, Conakry
Referee: Reinaldo Domingos Barbosa (Guinea-Bissau)

=== Group B ===
Pos	Team	Pld	W	D	L	GF	GA	GD	Pts	Qualification
1	Gambia	2	1	1	0	2	1	+1	4	Knockout stage
2	Mali	2	0	2	0	2	2	0	2	Knockout stage
3	Liberia	2	0	1	1	1	2	−1	1	

First match(es) will be played: 2018. Source: WAFU
Rules for classification: Group stage tiebreakers
25 November 2019
16:00

Gambia	1–1	Mali
Ceesay 32'	Report	Koné 90+4' (pen.)

Stade du 28 Septembre, Conakry
Referee: Younoussa Tawel Camara (Guinea)

27 November 2019
16:00

Gambia	1–0	Liberia
Bojang 90+1'	Report

Stade du 28 Septembre, Conakry
Referee: Alioune Sandigui (Senegal)

30 November 2019
16:00

Liberia	1–1	Mali
Karlay 71'		Mariko 46'

Stade du 28 Septembre, Conakry
Referee: Y. G. Mawabwè Bodjona (Togo)

== Knockout stage ==
=== Bracket ===
Semi-finals
4 Dec.– Conakry
Sierra Leone	0
Mali	1
4 Dec. – Conakry
Gambia	1 (2)
Senegal	1 (4)

Final
7 Dec. – Conakry
Mali	0
Senegal	2
Third place
7 Dec. – Conakry
Sierra Leone	0 (7)
Gambia	0 (8)

=== Semi-finals ===
4 December 2019
16:00

Sierra Leone	0–1	Mali
		Traoré 31'

Stade du 28 Septembre, Conakry
Referee: Raphiou Ligali (Benin)

4 December 2019
19:00

Gambia	1–1	Senegal
Sarr 45+2'		Ndiaw 25'
Penalties
	2-4

Stade du 28 Septembre, Conakry
Referee: Y. G. Mawabwè Bodjona (Togo)

=== Third place match ===
7 December 2019
16:00

Sierra Leone	0-0	Gambia
Penalties
	7-8

General Lansana Conté Stadium, Conakry
Referee: Alioune Sandigui (Senegal)

=== Final ===
7 December 2019
19:00

Mali	0-2	Senegal
	Report	Sarr 17'; Tangara 54' (o.g.)

General Lansana Conté Stadium, Conakry
Referee: Younoussa Tawel Camara (Guinea)

== Winners ==
2019 WAFU U-20 Tournament

Senegal
First title

== Awards ==
Best Player	(The Gambia) Matarr Ceesay
Best Goalkeeper	(Senegal) Boubacar Fall
Top Scorer	(Sierra Leone) Suffian Kalokoh
