= Kuda =

Kuda or KUDA may refer to:

== Villages in India ==
- Kuda, Dimapur, a village in Dimapur District, Nagaland, India
- Kuda, Mehsana, a village in Mahesana district of Gujarat, India

== Others ==
- Kakatiya Urban Development Authority, a planning agency in Warangal, Telangana, India
- Kuda Bank, an Africa-focused financial technology company headquartered in London
- KUDA (FM), a radio station (89.9 FM) licensed to serve Bonneville, Wyoming, United States; see List of radio stations in Wyoming
- Delta Andromedae, a star also named Kuda
- Mitsubishi Freeca, a compact MPV/SUV, rebadged as Mitsubishi Kuda in Indonesia
