= 2018 WAFU Zone B U-20 Tournament =

Tournament details
- Host country: Togo
- Dates: 6 - 16 December 2018
- Teams: 8 (from 1 sub-confederation)
- Venue: 1 (in 1 host city)

Final positions
- Champions: Senegal
- Runners-up: Nigeria
- Third place: Mali
- Fourth place: Niger

The 2018 WAFU Zone B U-20 Tournament is the first edition of the international Zone B U-20 men's football event for teams under the West African Football Union. The competition was hosted by Togo in December 2018 in One match venues. The organizers of the tournament, said it will run from 6-16 December 2018 which will feature eight teams were drawn in two groups of four. WAFU Zone B member teams were Ivory Coast, Niger, Burkina Faso, Ghana, Nigeria and Benin. Mali (from Zone A) replaced Côte d'Ivoire, who had withdrawn before the tournament. Mali (from Zone A) replaced Côte d'Ivoire, who had withdrawn before the tournament, and Senegal (from Zone A) were invited to make the numbers up to eight. The tournament was won by Senegal.

== Participants ==
Group A

- Togo
- Mali
- Burkina Faso
- Senegal

Group B

- Nigeria
- Ghana
- Niger

== Draw ==
The WAFU B U-20 Tournament draw ceremony was held in Lomé ON 12 November 2018.

=== Player eligibility ===
Players born 1 January 1998 or later are eligible to participate in the competition.

== Group stage ==
The top two teams of each group advance to the semi-finals.

Tiebreakers

Teams are ranked according to points (3 points for a win, 1 point for a draw, 0 points for a loss), and if tied on points, the following tie-breaking criteria are applied, in the order given, to determine the rankings.

1. Points in head-to-head matches among tied teams;
2. Goal difference in all group matches;
3. Goals scored in all group matches;
4. Disciplinary points (yellow card = 1 point, red card as a result of two yellow cards = 3 points, direct red card = 3 points, yellow card followed by direct red card = 4 points);
5. Drawing of lots.
6. If, after applying criteria 1 to 3 to several teams, more than two teams still have an equal ranking, criteria 1 to 3 are reapplied exclusively to the matches between the two teams in question to determine their final rankings. If this procedure does not lead to a decision, criteria 7 to 9 apply;
7. Points in head-to-head matches among tied teams;
8. Goal difference in matches between the teams concerned;
9. The greatest number of goals scored in the matches between the teams concerned.

All times are local UTC±00:00.

=== Group A ===
Pos	Team	Pld	W	D	L	GF	GA	GD	Pts	Qualification
1	Senegal	3	3	0	0	5	0	+5	9	Knockout stage
2	Mali	3	2	0	1	2	2	0	6	Knockout stage
3	Togo (H)	3	1	0	2	2	3	−1	3	
4	Burkina Faso	0	0	0	0	1	5	−4	0	

First match(es) will be played: 2018. Source: WAFU
Rules for classification: Group stage tiebreakers
(H) Hosts
6 December 2018
3:00 PM

Burkina Faso	0–2	Senegal
	Report

Stade Municipal, Lomé
6 December 2018
6:30 PM

Togo	0–1	Mali
	Report

Stade Municipal, Lomé

8 December 2018
3:30 PM

Mali	1-0	Burkina Faso
	Report

Stade Municipal, Lomé
8 December 2018
7:00 PM

Senegal	1-0	Togo
	Report

Stade Municipal, Lomé

11 December 2018
3:30 PM

Burkina Faso	1–2	Burkina Faso
	Report

Stade Municipal, Lomé
11 December 2018
7:00 PM

Mali	0–2	Mali
	Report

Stade Municipal, Lomé

=== Group B ===
Pos	Team	Pld	W	D	L	GF	GA	GD	Pts	Qualification
1	Nigeria	2	1	1	0	4	2	+2	4	Knockout stage
2	Niger	2	1	1	0	1	0	+1	4	Knockout stage
3	Ghana	2	0	0	2	2	5	−3	0	

First match(es) will be played: 2018. Source: WAFU
Rules for classification: Group stage tiebreakers
7 December 2018
4:00 PM

Niger	0–1	Ghana
	Report

Stade Municipal, Lomé
9 December 2018
4:00 PM

Nigeria	0–0	Niger
	Report

Stade Municipal, Lomé

12 December 2018
4:00 PM

Ghana	2–4	Niger
	Report

Stade Municipal, Lomé

=== Semi-finals ===
14 December 2018
3:00 PM

Senegal	2(4)-2(2)	Niger
	Report

Stade Municipal, Lomé

14 December 2018
6:30 PM

Nigeria	1(5)-1(4)	Mali
	Report

Stade Municipal, Lomé

=== Third place match ===
16 December 2018
3:00 PM

Niger	1-2	Mali
	Report

Stade Municipal, Lomé

=== Final ===
14 December 2018
6:30 PM

Senegal	2-0	Nigeria
	Report

Stade Municipal, Lomé

== Awards ==
The Golden Ball is awarded to the best player of the tournament. The Best Goalkeeper is awarded to the best goalkeeper of the tournament. The Golden Shoe is awarded to the top scorer of the tournament.

Top Scorer	(Senegal) Allen Njie
Best Goalkeeper	(Senegal) Dialy N'Diaye
Player of the Tournament	(Mali) Boubacar Konté
