= Sporting Lagos F.C. =

Football club in Lagos, Nigeria

Sporting Lagos
- Full name: Sporting Lagos Football Club
- Nicknames: The Noisy Lagosians; Blue and Yellow; The Tech Boys
- Founded: 2022; 4 years ago
- Stadium: Mobolaji Johnson Arena
- Capacity: 10,000
- Owner: Shola Akinlade
- Chairman: Godwin Enakhena
- Manager: Jeffrey Buter
- League: Nigeria Premier Football League
- 2025–26: Nigeria National League, winners (promoted)
- Website: https://sportinglagos.com
Home colours	Away colours

Sporting Lagos Football Club is a professional football club from Lagos, Nigeria founded in 2022. The club currently competes in the Nigeria Premier Football League, the first tier of Nigeria's football league system, following promotion from the 2025-2026 Nigeria National League. Sporting Lagos play their home games at Mobolaji Johnson Arena also known as Onikan Stadium.

== History ==
=== Early beginnings ===
The club was founded on February 3, 2022, in Lagos, Nigeria by Shola Akinlade, Before this there were many clubs in the city, the most popular of which were Ikorodu United FC and Julius Berger FC.

Sporting Lagos played their first match on February 13, 2022, against Go Round FC, which ended in a 1–1. The team finished second in their group in the (NNL) Super Eight playoff in its second season and joined the Nigeria Professional Football League (NPFL) at the start of the 2023–24 season. In 2022 Paul Offor was appointed manager. He led Sporting Lagos to its first Cup title in 2023 and promotion to the NPFL before been sacked in April 2024. He was replaced by Ibrahim Biffo who was also a coach at Kwara United, Katsina United, and Niger Tornadoes.

=== From NNL to Nigeria Football League (NPFL) (2022 – present) ===
Sporting secured promotion to the Nigeria Professional Football League (NPFL) for the 2023/24 season. after a 2-0 victory over Stormers SC in their second game of the Nigeria National League (NNL) Super Eight playoff. before winning the Championship title of the maiden edition of the Naija Super 8 pre-season tournament following a 4–2 victory at local rivals Remo Stars F.C.

In 2023–24, Sporting Lagos were relegated back to the NNL after they lost on the final matchday and finished in 17th place with 46 points. Sporting Lagos drew an average home attendance of 1,180 in the 2023–24 Nigeria Premier Football League.

On 28 June 2025, it was reported that the club's head coach, Shola Adegun, had left his role at the club to join Plateau United F.C. On 10 July 2025, the club confirmed his departure on their website, adding that Jeffery Buter would handle interim training. The club appointed Jeffrey Butter as head coach ahead of the new season.

Following the appointment of Jeffrey Buter, the club finished top of Southern Conference B in the 2025–26 season to secure promotion to the Nigeria Premier Football League (NPFL). They then topped the NNL Super Four playoffs on goal difference, winning the league and securing their first competitive title.

Sporting Lagos returned to the country's top-flight league, after two seasons in the second division.

== Colours and badge ==
Its home colours have been neon blue and pantone blue. When the club was founded in 2022, blue shirts were used until the club adopted its new colour of neon blue and Pantone blue in 2023. The city's symbol was adopted as the club's badge (or crest), and was incorporated into the kit in 2023 during the start of the 2023-24 season.

The Sporting Lagos away jersey has been all yellow shirts and yellow shorts. For the 2024/2025 season the club wore a white away jersey with black trims.

== Stadium ==
Sporting Lagos originally played at the Teslim Balogun Stadium in their first season before moving to the University of Lagos Stadium at the end of that campaign. The following season, the club relocated to the Mobolaji Johnson Arena — also known as Onikan Stadium and regarded as the oldest stadium in the country — where they have played ever since. Plans were later announced to build a new club-owned stadium at Landmark, but the project had to be discontinued due to the construction of the coastal highway.

== Rivals ==
Sporting Lagos’ three main rivals are Remo Stars — a rivalry ignited after Sporting Lagos defeated Remo Stars twice in the Naija Super 8 preseason tournament, including in the final to clinch the title — Also Inter Lagos and Ikorodu City, their opponents in the Lagos Derbies.

== Academy ==
The Sporting Lagos Football Academy was founded in 2023 and competes in the TCC League and Cup, as well as in the Nigeria Nationwide League (NLO), the third division of Nigerian football. The academy also participated in the NPFL Youth League while the club was in the NPFL.

In the 2023/2024 season, Yusuf Abdullahi, Ugochukwu Emmanuel, Adamu Mukhtar, Seun Akanji and Odinaka Okoro became the first set of academy players to feature for the first team in the Lagos FA Cup. That same season, Odinaka Okoro became the first academy player to represent the first team in an NPFL match, making his debut away against Heartland.

The academy achieved international recognition in 2024, winning the U17 male category of the Gothia Cup in Sweden.

Also in 2024, Edward Ochigbo and Samuel Umoh were invited to the Nigeria U15 team for the 3-Nation U15 Developmental Tournament in Rabat, Morocco. Ebenezer Harcourt and Odinaka Okoro later went on to represent Nigeria at U20 level, and in 2025, Ebenezer Harcourt became the youngest player to represent the Nigeria senior national team, making his debut at the age of 15.

== Sponsorship ==
Season	Kit Manufacturer	Shirt Sponsor (chest)	Shirt Sponsor (sleeve)
2023	Umbro	Klasha	_
2023-2024	Umbro	Klasha	ChopLife
2024-2025	Decimal	Rexona	ChopLife
2025-2026	Decimal	_	_
2026-2027	Decimal	Kuda	Chowdeck

In 2023, the club revealed a new partnership with Klasha, a cross-border payments, and commerce platform in Africa, as its headline sponsor. At the start of the 2023-24 season, it also unveiled a new club logo and brand launch.

== Squad ==
=== First-team squad ===
Note: Flags indicate national team as defined under FIFA eligibility rules; some limited exceptions apply. Players may hold more than one non-FIFA nationality.

No.	Pos.	Nation	Player
1	GK	NGA	Clinton Lawani
34	GK	NGA	Usman Mohammed
35	GK	NGA	Ebenezer Harcourt
2	DF	NGA	Uloko Solomon (captain)
3	DF	NGA	Hillary Zion
4	DF	NGA	Sodiq Yusuf
5	DF	NGA	Abraham Idakwo
12	DF	NGA	Abdulrahman Mohammed
13	DF	NGA	Odinaka Okoro
19	DF	NGA	Isaac Annor
23	DF	NGA	Chidera Okafor
27	DF	NGA	Abdullahi Abdulraqeeb
33	DF	NGA	Samuel Umoh
36	DF	NGA	Solomon Adabo
6	MF	NGA	Aondona Adeede
8	MF	NGA	Valentine Ugwu
10	MF	NGA	Victor Samuel

No.	Pos.	Nation	Player
16	MF	NGA	Hadi Haruna
17	MF	NGA	Lukman Adigun
18	MF	NGA	Tamuno Kalio
22	MF	NGA	Stanley Chukwu
24	MF	NGA	Miebogo Azibato
26	MF	NGA	Salihu Batunba
7	FW	NGA	Kelvin Unenge
9	FW	NGA	Aliyu Baba
11	FW	NGA	Chinedu Sunday
14	FW	NGA	Joel Ajibola
20	FW	NGA	Ayoola Gafar
21	FW	NGA	Sukanmi Odusina
25	FW	NGA	Ibrahim Abdulganiyu
28	FW	NGA	Daniel Aboh
30	FW	NGA	Joseph Emmanuel
32	FW	NGA	Fuad Ojediran

== Club staff ==
Position	Staff
Head coach	(Nigeria) Jeffrey Buter
Team Manager	(Nigeria) Yemisi Cole

=== Managerial history ===
Dates	Name	Notes
2022	(Nigeria) Uche Okagbue	
2022	(Nigeria) Sanjo Olutayo	
2023 – 2024	(Nigeria) Paul Offor	
2024	(Nigeria) Abdullahi Biffo	
2024 – 2025	(Nigeria) Shola Adegun	
2025 -	(Nigeria) Jeffrey Buter	
