= List of feeder teams in football =

The following is a list of association football clubs and their affiliates, past and present. Teams may have a feeder club for a number of reasons, including the ability to loan out inexperienced youngsters, to allow young, foreign players to gain a work permit, or for business purposes, such as merchandising. In English football the operation of an external feeder team is prohibited, and so the agreements are more informal, and usually between local teams.

== Belgium ==
=== K.S.K. Beveren (club defunct) ===
- (Ivory Coast) ASEC Mimosas (defunct)

== Colombia ==
=== Atlético Nacional ===
- (Colombia) Alianza Petrolera

=== Deportes Quindío ===
- (Colombia) Boca Juniors de Cali

=== Junior ===
- (Colombia) Barranquilla

=== Millonarios F.C. ===
- (Colombia) Valledupar F.C.

=== Santa Fe ===
- (Colombia) Patriotas

== Croatia ==
=== Dinamo Zagreb ===
- (Croatia) NK Lokomotiva
- (Croatia) NK Radnik Sesvete

== Czech Republic ==
=== 1. SC Znojmo ===
- (Czech Republic) FC Slovan Rosice

=== FK Baník Most ===
- (Czech Republic) Arsenal Česká Lípa

=== FK Bohemians Prague (Střížkov) ===
- (Czech Republic) SK Viktorie Jirny

=== FK Teplice ===
- (Czech Republic) SK Roudnice nad Labem

=== SK Dynamo České Budějovice ===
- (Czech Republic) SK Strakonice 1908 (defunct)

=== SK Sigma Olomouc ===
- (Czech Republic) FK SAN-JV Šumperk

== Denmark ==
=== FC Nordsjælland ===
- (Denmark) Allerød FK
- (Denmark) FA 2000
- (Denmark) Frederikssund IK
- (Denmark) FC Helsingør
- (Denmark) Hørsholm-Usserød IK
- (Denmark) Ishøj IF
- (Denmark) KFUM Roskilde
- (Denmark) Nykøbing FC

=== F.C. Copenhagen ===
- (Denmark) Hellerup IK
- (Denmark) BK Skjold
- (Denmark) Herlev IF
- (Denmark) Holbæk B&I
- (Denmark) Hørsholm-Usserød IK
- (Denmark) KFUMs Boldklub København
- (Denmark) Slagelse B&I
- (Denmark) Sundby BK
- (Denmark) Vanløse IF
- (Denmark) Greve Fodbold
- (Greenland) B67 Nuuk
- (Denmark) FC Helsingør
- (Faroe Islands) Argja Bóltfelag
- (Faroe Islands) B36 Tórshavn
- (Sweden) FC Rosengård

=== Brøndby IF ===
- (Denmark) BK Frem
- (Denmark) BK Avarta
- (Denmark) AB Tårnby
- (Denmark) Ishøj IF
- (Denmark) Tårnby FF
- (Denmark) Glostrup FK
- (Denmark) Nykøbing FC
- (Denmark) Hvidovre IF

=== Odense BK ===
- (Denmark) Næstved BK
- (Denmark) Næsby BK
- (Denmark) SfB-Oure FA

=== Silkeborg IF ===
- (Denmark) Kjellerup IF
- (Denmark) Young Boys FD

=== FC Midtjylland ===
- (Denmark) Holstebro BK
- (Denmark) Skive IK
- (Denmark) Thisted FC
- (Portugal) C.D. Mafra
- (Nigeria) F.C. Ebedei

=== HB Køge ===
- (Denmark) KFUM Roskilde
- (United States) Alexandria SA
- (Kazakhstan) FC Atyrau

=== Vejle BK ===
- (Denmark) Hedensted IF

=== AC Horsens ===
- (Denmark) Odder IGF

== England ==
=== Arsenal F.C. ===
- (Ivory Coast) ASEC Mimosas
- (Belgium) K.S.K. Beveren (club defunct)
- (United States) Colorado Rapids
- (Scotland) Inverness Caledonian Thistle

=== Aston Villa F.C. ===
- (Egypt) ZED FC

=== Blackburn Rovers F.C. ===
- (Belgium) Cercle Brugge K.S.V.

=== Bradford City A.F.C. ===
- (Belgium) Royal Racing FC Montegnee (defunct)

=== Bolton Wanderers F.C. ===
- (Northern Ireland) Ballymena United
- (Spain) Elche CF
- (China) Wuhan Huanghelou (defunct)

=== Charlton Athletic F.C. ===
- (Ivory Coast) ASEC Mimosas
- (Belgium) K.F.C. Germinal Beerschot (defunct)
- (Finland) MyPa
- (China) Shanghai United F.C (defunct)

=== Chelsea ===
- (United States) LA Galaxy
- (Netherlands) PSV Eindhoven
- (Netherlands) Vitesse
- (France) RC Strasbourg Alsace

=== Crystal Palace ===
- (United States) Crystal Palace Baltimore (defunct)

=== Leeds United ===
- (Northern Ireland) Glenavon F.C.
- (Spain) Cultural Leonesa
- (Spain) Atlético Astorga
- (Belgium) K.A.S. Eupen
- (Qatar) Aspire Academy

=== Liverpool ===
- (Belgium) K.R.C. Genk

=== Manchester City ===
- (Spain) Girona FC (from August 2017)
- (Denmark) Aarhus (defunct)
- (Wales) Bangor City(defunct)
- (South Africa) Black Aces F.C. (defunct)
- (Sweden) BK Häcken (defunct)
- (Thailand) Chonburi FC (defunct)
- (Sweden) Djurgårdens IF (defunct)
- (Portugal) Gil Vicente (defunct)
- (Switzerland) Grasshopper Club Zürich (defunct)
- (England) Hyde (defunct)
- (Belgium) KV Mechelen (defunct)
- (Netherlands) NEC Nijmegen (defunct)
- (United States) New York City F.C.
- (Australia) Melbourne City FC
- (Australia) Perth Glory (defunct)
- (Portugal) Sporting CP
- (China) Shanghai Shenhua (defunct)
- (Norway) Strømsgodset IF (defunct)
- (South Africa) Thanda Royal Zulu (defunct)

=== Manchester United ===
- (Wales) Connah's Quay Nomads F.C.
- (Brazil) Desportivo Brasil
- (Netherlands) F.C. Twente
- (Brazil) Fluminense Football Club
- (Norway) Manglerud Star Toppfotball
- (Australia) Parramatta Eagles (defunct)
- (Sweden) IF Brommapojkarna (defunct)
- (Scotland) Livingston F.C.
- (Wales) Newport County A.F.C.
- (Belgium) Royal Antwerp FC
- (Republic of Ireland) Shelbourne
- (England) Walsall
- (South Africa) Western Province United

=== Nottingham Forest F.C. ===
- (Republic of Ireland) Crumlin United F.C.

=== Norwich City F.C. ===
- (United States) Tampa Bay Rowdies
- (Brazil) Coritiba
- (Spain) UD Las Palmas
- (India) Chennaiyin FC

=== Preston North End ===
- (England) Holker Old Boys F.C.

=== Sheffield United ===
- (China) Chengdu Blades (defunct)
- (Belgium) White Star Woluwé F.C.

=== Stoke City ===
- (United States) Orlando City SC

=== Sunderland ===
- (Ghana) Asante Kotoko
- (Egypt) El-Ittihad El-Iskandary
- (South Africa) Bidvest Wits F.C.
- (United States) D.C. United
- (Belgium) Lierse S.K.

=== Tottenham Hotspur ===
- (South Africa) Supersport United
- (Hong Kong) South China AA
- (United States) San Jose Earthquakes
- (United States) Tallahassee Tottenham Hotspur F.C.
- (Brazil) Internacional
- (Belgium) Westerlo

=== West Ham United ===
- (Nigeria) Ifeanyi Ubah F.C.

=== Wolverhampton Wanderers ===
- (Switzerland) Grasshopper Club Zürich
- (Australia) Truganina Hornets Soccer Club

== France ==
=== Monaco ===
- (Belgium) Cercle Brugge

== Germany ==
=== FC Bayern Munich ===
- (United States) Los Angeles FC

== Indonesia ==
=== Persib Bandung ===
- (Indonesia) Bandung United

== Italy ==
=== Bologna FC 1909 ===
- (Canada) CF Montréal

== Mexico ==
=== Pachuca ===
- (United States) Colorado Rapids

== Morocco ==
=== Wydad ===
- (Morocco) SCC Mohammédia

== Netherlands ==
=== Ajax ===
- (South Africa) Ajax Cape Town -relationship ended
- (Netherlands) Almere City

=== FC Twente ===
- (United States) Dayton Dutch Lions
- (Azerbaijan) FK Qarabağ - relationship now ended.

=== Feyenoord ===
- (Netherlands) SBV Excelsior
- Feyenoord Ghana

== New Zealand ==
=== Wellington Phoenix ===
- (New Zealand) Team Wellington

== Portugal ==
=== S.L. Benfica ===
- (Portugal) F.C. Alverca
- (Poland) Zagłębie Lubin defunct
- (United States) FC Dallas

== Scotland ==
=== Aberdeen ===
- (United States) Atlanta United FC

=== Celtic ===
- (Belgium) KV Oostende (defunct)
- (Mexico) Santos Laguna

=== Heart of Midlothian ===
- (Lithuania) FBK Kaunas

=== Hibernian ===
- (United States) Charleston Battery
- (Scotland) Stenhousemuir F.C.
- (England) Brighton & Hove Albion F.C.

=== Inverness CT ===
- (England) Arsenal

=== Rangers ===
- (Germany) HSV

=== St Mirren ===
- (New Zealand) Birkenhead United (from June 2021)
- (New Zealand) Nelson Suburbs (from June 2021)

=== Motherwell ===
- (Australia) Sorrento Soccer Club

== Spain ==
=== Atlético Madrid ===
- (China) Shenhua FC
- (Canada) Atletico Ottawa
- (Mexico) Atletico San Luis

=== Athletic Bilbao ===
- (Spain) CD Basconia

=== Eibar ===
- (Spain) CD Vitoria

=== Mallorca ===
- (Colombia) Real Cartagena

=== Osasuna ===
- (Spain) CD Iruña

=== Sevilla FC ===
- (Puerto Rico) Sevilla FC Juncos

== Sweden ==
=== IFK Norrköping ===
- (Sweden) IF Sylvia
- (Sweden) Husqvarna FF

=== IFK Göteborg ===
- (Sweden) Västra Frölunda IF

== Turkey ==
=== Galatasaray ===
- (Russia) Alania Vladikavkaz
- (Turkey) Güneştepespor
- (England) Reading F.C.
- (Turkey) Beylikgücüspor
- (Germany) KSV Hessen Kassel
- (Germany) SG Wattenscheid

== See also ==
- Reserve team
