= 2018 WAFU/FOX U-20 Tournament =

Tournament details
- Host country: Liberia
- Dates: 24 April – 5 May 2018
- Teams: 8 (from 1 sub-confederation)
- Venues: 2 (in 1 host city)

Final positions
- Champions: Gambia
- Runners-up: Liberia
- Third place: Mali
- Fourth place: Ivory Coast

The 2018 WAFU/FOX U-20 Tournament was the first edition of the international U-20 men's football event for teams under the West African Football Union. The competition will be hosted by Liberia in April to May 2018 in two match venues. The organizers of the tournament, which is sponsored by FOX Sports, said it will run from April 24, to May 6, 2018 in Monrovia and will feature eight of the nine countries in WAFU Zone A who have confirmed their participation in the zonal youth championship.

Host Liberia, Cape Verde, Guinea Bissau and Sierra Leone make up Group A whilst Senegal, Mali, Gambia and Guinea complete Group B.

Matches will be held at the Samuel Kanyon Doe Sports Stadium and the Antoinette Tubman Stadium, both in Monrovia, Liberia.

== Participants ==
Group A

- Liberia
- Ivory Coast
- Guinea-Bissau
- Sierra Leone

Group B

- Senegal
- Mali
- Gambia
- Guinea

== Officials ==
Referees

- (Senegal) Daouda Gueye
- (The Gambia) Omar Sallah
- (Mauritania) Babacar Sarr
- (Mali) Harouna Coulibaly
- (Guinea-Bissau) Gilberto Antonio dos Santos
- (Liberia) Jerry Yekeh
- (Guinea) Baba Leno
- (Sierra Leone) Raymond Coker

Assistant Referees

- (Senegal) Serigne Cheikh Touré
- (The Gambia) Ebrima Jallow
- (Mauritania) Hamedine Diba
- (Mali) Baba Yomboliba
- (Guinea-Bissau) Firmino Bassafim
- (Liberia) Sekou Kanneh Jr
- (Sierra Leone) Ibrahim Ba
- (Guinea) Mamadou Tere

== Draw ==
The draw was held on 26 March in Monrovia.

=== Player eligibility ===
Players born 1 January 1998 or later are eligible to participate in the competition.

== Group stage ==
The top two teams of each group advance to the semi-finals.

Tiebreakers

Teams are ranked according to points (3 points for a win, 1 point for a draw, 0 points for a loss), and if tied on points, the following tie-breaking criteria are applied, in the order given, to determine the rankings.

1. Points in head-to-head matches among tied teams;
2. Goal difference in all group matches;
3. Goals scored in all group matches;
4. Disciplinary points (yellow card = 1 point, red card as a result of two yellow cards = 3 points, direct red card = 3 points, yellow card followed by direct red card = 4 points);
5. Drawing of lots.
6. If, after applying criteria 1 to 3 to several teams, more than two teams still have an equal ranking, criteria 1 to 3 are reapplied exclusively to the matches between the two teams in question to determine their final rankings. If this procedure does not lead to a decision, criteria 7 to 9 apply;
7. Points in head-to-head matches among tied teams;
8. Goal difference in matches between the teams concerned;
9. The greatest number of goals scored in the matches between the teams concerned.

All times are local UTC±00:00.

=== Group A ===
Pos	Team	Pld	W	D	L	GF	GA	GD	Pts	Qualification
1	Ivory Coast	3	3	0	0	11	1	+10	9	Knockout stage
2	Liberia (H)	3	2	0	1	7	5	+2	6	Knockout stage
3	Sierra Leone	3	1	0	2	4	10	−6	3	
4	Guinea-Bissau	3	0	0	3	2	8	−6	0	

First match(es) will be played: 2018. Source: WAFU
Rules for classification: Group stage tiebreakers
(H) Hosts
24 April 2018
15:30

Liberia	0–3	Ivory Coast
	Report

Samuel Kanyon Doe Sports Complex, Monrovia
Referee: (Senegal) Daouda Gueye
24 April 2018
18:00

Guinea-Bissau	1–2	Sierra Leone
	Report

Samuel Kanyon Doe Sports Complex, Monrovia
Referee: (The Gambia) Omar Sallah

26 April 2018
15:30

Sierra Leone	1–4	Ivory Coast

Samuel Kanyon Doe Sports Complex, Monrovia
Referee: (Guinea) Baba Léno
26 April 2018
18:00

Liberia	2–1	Guinea-Bissau

Samuel Kanyon Doe Sports Complex, Monrovia
Referee: (Mali) Harouna Coulibaly

28 April 2018
16:00

Liberia	5–1	Sierra Leone
	Report

Antoinette Tubman Stadium, Monrovia
Referee: (Senegal) Daouda Gueye
28 April 2018
16:00

Ivory Coast	4–0	Guinea-Bissau
	Report

Samuel Kanyon Doe Sports Complex, Monrovia
Referee: (Mali) Harouna Coulibaly

=== Group B ===
Pos	Team	Pld	W	D	L	GF	GA	GD	Pts	Qualification
1	Mali	3	2	0	1	4	2	+2	6	Knockout stage
2	Gambia	3	1	2	0	2	1	+1	5	Knockout stage
3	Senegal	3	1	1	1	5	5	0	4	
4	Guinea	3	0	1	2	3	6	−3	1	

First match(es) will be played: 2018. Source: WAFU
Rules for classification: Group stage tiebreakers
25 April 2018
15:30

Senegal	1–3	Mali
Sagna 77'	Report	Dramé 32'; N'Diaye 62', 71'

Samuel Kanyon Doe Sports Complex, Monrovia
Referee: (Liberia) Jerry Yekeh
25 April 2018
18:00

Gambia	1–1	Guinea
Jammeh 31'	Report	Vebe 26'

Samuel Kanyon Doe Sports Complex, Monrovia
Referee: (Mauritania) Babacar Sarr

27 April 2018
15:30

Guinea	0–1	Mali

Samuel Kanyon Doe Sports Complex, Monrovia
Referee: (Sierra Leone) Raymond Coker
27 April 2018
18:00

Senegal	0–0	Gambia

Samuel Kanyon Doe Sports Complex, Monrovia
Referee: (Guinea-Bissau) Gilberto Antonio dos Santos

29 April 2018
16:00

Guinea	2–4	Senegal

Samuel Kanyon Doe Sports Complex, Monrovia
Referee: (Liberia) Jerry Yekeh
29 April 2018
16:00

Mali	0–1	Gambia

Antoinette Tubman Stadium, Monrovia
Referee: (Mauritania) Babacar Sarr

== Knockout stage ==
=== Bracket ===
Semi-finals
2 May – Monrovia
Ivory Coast	1 (5)
Gambia	1 (6)
2 May – Monrovia
Mali	0
Liberia	1

Final
5 May – Monrovia
Gambia	2
Liberia	1
Third place
5 May – Monrovia
Ivory Coast	0
Mali	1

=== Semi-finals ===
2 May 2018
15:30

Ivory Coast	1–1	Gambia
Diabate 57'	Report	Mbye 27'
Penalties
	5–6

Samuel Kanyon Doe Sports Complex, Monrovia
Referee: (Sierra Leone) Raymond Coker

2 May 2018
18:00

Mali	0–1	Liberia
	Report	Kebbeh 13'

Samuel Kanyon Doe Sports Complex, Monrovia
Referee: (Guinea-Bissau) Gilberto Antonio dos Santos

=== Third place match ===
5 May 2018
15:00

Ivory Coast	0–1	Mali
	Report	Gary 32'

Samuel Kanyon Doe Sports Complex, Monrovia
Referee: (The Gambia) Omar Sallah

=== Final ===
5 May 2018
18:00

Gambia	2–1	Liberia
Jammeh 3'; Jatta 67'	Report	Sengbeh 50'

Samuel Kanyon Doe Sports Complex, Monrovia
Referee: (Guinea) Baba Léno

== Winners ==
2018 WAFU/FOX U-20 Tournament

Gambia
First title

== Awards ==
Best Player	(Liberia) Allen Njie
Best Goalkeeper	(The Gambia) Yankuba Colley
Top Scorer	(Ivory Coast) Yalatif Diabate
