= April 2011 in sports =

<<	April 2011					>>
Su	Mo	Tu	We	Th	Fr	Sa
					1	2
3	4	5	6	7	8	9
10	11	12	13	14	15	16
17	18	19	20	21	22	23
24	25	26	27	28	29	30
Sports

This list shows notable sports-related deaths, events, and notable outcomes that occurred in April of 2011.

== Deaths in April ==
- 19: Grete Waitz
- 25: Joe Perry
- 26: Sadler's Wells

== Current sporting seasons ==
=== Australian rules football 2011 ===
- Australian Football League

=== Auto racing 2011 ===
- Formula One
- Sprint Cup
- Nationwide Series
- Camping World Truck Series
- IRL IndyCar Series
- World Rally Championship
- WTCC
- V8 Supercar
- Formula Two
- Rolex Sports Car Series
- F3 Euro Series

=== Baseball 2011 ===
- Major League Baseball
- Nippon Professional Baseball

=== Basketball 2011 ===
- NBA
  - NBA Playoffs
- NCAA Division I men
- NCAA Division I women
- Euroleague
- EuroLeague Women
- Eurocup
- EuroChallenge
- Australia
- France
- Germany
- Greece
- Israel
- Italy
- Philippines
  - Commissioner's Cup
- Russia
- Spain
- Turkey

=== Cricket 2011 ===
- England:
  - County Championship
  - Clydesdale Bank 40
- India:
  - Premier League

=== Darts 2011 ===
- Premier League

=== Football (soccer) 2011 ===
National teams competitions

- UEFA Euro 2012 qualifying
- 2012 Africa Cup of Nations qualification

International clubs competitions

- UEFA (Europe) Champions League
- UEFA Europa League
- UEFA Women's Champions League
- Copa Libertadores (South America)
- AFC (Asia) Champions League
- AFC Cup
- CAF (Africa) Champions League
- CAF Confederation Cup
- CONCACAF (North & Central America) Champions League

Domestic (national) competitions

- Argentina
- England
- France
- Germany
- Iran
- Italy
- Japan
- Norway
- Portugal
- Russia
- Scotland
- Spain
- Major League Soccer (USA & Canada)
- Women's Professional Soccer (USA)

=== Golf 2011 ===
- PGA Tour
- European Tour
- LPGA Tour
- Champions Tour

=== Ice hockey 2011 ===
- National Hockey League
  - Stanley Cup playoffs
- Kontinental Hockey League
- Elitserien
- Canadian Hockey League:
  - OHL, QMJHL, WHL
- NCAA Division I men

=== Motorcycle racing 2011 ===
- Moto GP
- Superbike World Championship
- Supersport World Championship

=== Rugby league 2011 ===
- Super League
- NRL

=== Rugby union 2011 ===
- Heineken Cup
- European Challenge Cup
- English Premiership
- Celtic League
- Top 14
- Super Rugby
- Sevens World Series

=== Tennis 2011 ===
- ATP World Tour
- WTA Tour

=== Volleyball 2011 ===
Domestic (national) competitions

- Iranian Men's Super League
- Philippine collegiate (UAAP)

== Days of the month ==
=== April 30, 2011 (Saturday) ===
==== Auto racing ====
- Sprint Cup Series:
  - Crown Royal Presents the Matthew and Daniel Hansen 400 in Richmond, Virginia: (1) (Nevada) Kyle Busch (Toyota; Joe Gibbs Racing) (2) Denny Hamlin (Toyota; Joe Gibbs Racing) (3) (Washington (state)) Kasey Kahne (Toyota; Team Red Bull)
    - Drivers' championship standings (after 9 of 36 races): (1) (Missouri) Carl Edwards (Ford; Roush Fenway Racing) 335 points (2) (California) Jimmie Johnson (Chevrolet; Hendrick Motorsports) 326 (3) Busch 305
- V8 Supercars:
  - Trading Post Perth Challenge in Perth, Western Australia:
    - Race 7: (1) Jamie Whincup (AUS) (Triple Eight Race Engineering, Holden VE Commodore) (2) Craig Lowndes (AUS) (Triple Eight Race Engineering, Holden VE Commodore) (3) Will Davison (AUS) (Ford Performance Racing, Ford FG Falcon)
      - Drivers' championship standings (after 7 of 27 races): (1) Whincup 754 points (2) Lowndes 644 (3) Rick Kelly (AUS) (Kelly Racing, Holden VE Commodore) 629

==== Cycling ====
- UCI World Tour:
  - Tour de Romandie, stage 4: (gold) David Zabriskie (USA) (Garmin–Cervélo) 27' 57" (silver) Richie Porte (AUS) (Saxo Bank–SunGard) + 2" (bronze) Lieuwe Westra (NED) (Vacansoleil–DCM) + 14"
    - General classification: (1) Cadel Evans (AUS) (BMC Racing Team) 13h 00' 58" (2) Tony Martin (GER) (HTC–Highroad) + 18" (3) Alexander Vinokourov (KAZ) (Astana) + 19"

==== Equestrianism ====
- FEI World Cup Finals in Leipzig, Germany:
  - Vaulting final:
    - Women: (gold) Simone Wiegele (GER) (silver) Antje Hill (GER) (bronze) Anna Cavallaro (ITA)
    - Men: (gold) Patric Looser (SUI) (silver) Nicolas Andréani (FRA) (bronze) Viktor Brüsewitz (GER)
  - Dressage final (Grand Prix Freestyle): (gold) Adelinde Cornelissen (NED) on Parzival (silver) Nathalie of Sayn-Wittgenstein-Berleburg (DEN) on Digby (bronze) Ulla Salzgeber (GER) on Herzruf's Erbe
  - Show jumping: Grand Prix (CSI 3*): (gold) Denis Lynch (IRL) on All Inclusive NRW (silver) Billy Twomey (IRL) on Romanov (bronze) McLain Ward (USA) on Rothchild

==== Figure skating ====
- World Championships in Moscow, Russia:
  - Ladies: (gold) Miki Ando (JPN) 195.79 points (silver) Kim Yuna (KOR) 194.50 (bronze) Carolina Kostner (ITA) 184.68
    - Ando wins her second world title, and first since 2007.
  - Ice dancing: (gold) Meryl Davis/Charlie White (USA) 185.27 points (silver) Tessa Virtue/Scott Moir (CAN) 181.79 (bronze) Maia Shibutani/Alex Shibutani (USA) 163.79
    - Davis and White become the first American pair to win an ice dancing world title.

==== Football (soccer) ====
- (Greece) Greek Cup Final in Athens: **AEK Athens** 3–0 Atromitos
  - AEK win the Cup for the 14th time and first since 2002.
- (San Marino) Coppa Titano Final in Serravalle: **Juvenes/Dogana** 4–1 Virtus
  - Juvenes/Dogana win the Cup for the ninth time.
- (Germany) Fußball-Bundesliga, matchday 32 (teams in **bold** qualify for the UEFA Champions League):
  - 1. FC Köln 2–0 **Bayer Leverkusen**
  - **Borussia Dortmund** 2–0 1. FC Nürnberg
    - Standings: Borussia Dortmund 72 points, Bayer Leverkusen 64, Bayern Munich 59.
    - Borussia Dortmund win the title for the seventh time and their first since 2001–02.
- (Wales) Premier League, matchday 32 (team in **bold** qualifies for the UEFA Champions League, team in italics qualifies for the UEFA Europa League):
  - **Bangor City** 1–0 The New Saints
    - Standings: Bangor City 70 points, The New Saints 68, Neath 58.
    - Bangor City win the title for the third time and their first since 1994–95.

==== Horse racing ====
- English Thoroughbred Triple Crown:
  - 2,000 Guineas Stakes in Newmarket: (gold) Frankel (trainer: Henry Cecil; jockey: Tom Queally) (silver) Dubawi Gold (trainer: Richard Hannon Sr.; jockey: Richard Hughes) (bronze) Native Khan (trainer: Ed Dunlop; jockey: Olivier Peslier)

==== Ice hockey ====
- Men's World Championship in Slovakia:
  - Group C in Košice:
    - United States 5–1 Austria
    - Norway 5–4 (SO) Sweden
  - Group D in Bratislava:
    - Finland 5–1 Denmark
    - Czech Republic 4–2 Latvia
- Stanley Cup playoffs (all series best-of-7; seeds in parentheses):
  - Eastern Conference Semifinals:
    - Game 1 in Philadelphia: (3) Boston Bruins 7, (2) Philadelphia Flyers 3. Bruins lead series 1–0.
  - Western Conference Semifinals:
    - Game 2 in Vancouver: (5) Nashville Predators 2, (1) Vancouver Canucks 1 (2OT). Series tied 1–1.

==== Mixed martial arts ====
- UFC 129 in Toronto, Canada:
  - Welterweight Championship bout: Georges St-Pierre (CAN) (c) def. Jake Shields (USA) by unanimous decision (50–45, 48–47, 48–47)
  - Featherweight Championship bout: José Aldo (BRA) (c) def. Mark Hominick (CAN) by unanimous decision (48–45, 48–46, 49–46)
  - Light Heavyweight bout: Lyoto Machida (BRA) def. Randy Couture (USA) by knockout (flying front crane kick)
  - Light Heavyweight bout: Vladimir Matyushenko (BLR) def. Jason Brilz (USA) by knockout (punches)
  - Lightweight bout: Benson Henderson (USA) def. Mark Bocek (CAN) by unanimous decision (30–27, 30–27, 30–27)

==== Rugby union ====
- Heineken Cup semi-finals:
  - **Leinster** (Ireland) 32–23 (France) Toulouse in Dublin
- Amlin Challenge Cup semi-finals:
  - Munster (Ireland) 12–20 (England) **Harlequins**

==== Snooker ====
- World Championship in Sheffield, England, semi-finals:
  - **Judd Trump** (ENG) 17–15 Ding Junhui (CHN)
    - Trump reaches his second consecutive ranking final and becomes the second youngest player to reach a World Championship final after Stephen Hendry (SCO) in 1990.
  - Mark Williams (WAL) 14–17 **John Higgins** (SCO)
    - Higgins reaches his third World Championship final in five years, fifth total and seventh final of the season.

==== Tennis ====
- WTA Tour:
  - Barcelona Ladies Open in Barcelona, Spain:
    - Final: **Roberta Vinci** (ITA) def. Lucie Hradecká (CZE) 4–6, 6–2, 6–2
      - Vinci wins the tournament for the second time in three years, for the fourth title of her career.
  - Estoril Open in Estoril, Portugal:
    - Final: **Anabel Medina Garrigues** (ESP) def. Kristina Barrois (GER) 6–1, 6–2.
      - Medina Garrigues wins the tenth title of her career.

=== April 29, 2011 (Friday) ===
==== American football ====
- The U.S. 8th Circuit Court of Appeals grants the NFL's request for a temporary stay of the injunction that had ended the league's lockout of its players. Arguments on a permanent stay are expected to be heard next week.

==== Auto racing ====
- Nationwide Series:
  - Bubba Burger 250 in Richmond, Virginia: (1) Denny Hamlin (Toyota; Joe Gibbs Racing) (2) (Wisconsin) Paul Menard (Chevrolet; Kevin Harvick Inc.) (3) (Illinois) Justin Allgaier (Chevrolet; Turner Motorsports)
    - Drivers' championship standings (after 9 of 34 races): (1) Allgaier 305 points (2) (Virginia) Elliott Sadler (Chevrolet; Kevin Harvick Inc.) 299 (3) (Florida) Aric Almirola (Chevrolet; JR Motorsports) 297

==== Basketball ====
- EuroChallenge Final Four in Ostend, Belgium:
  - Spartak Saint Petersburg (Russia) 64–74 (Russia) **Lokomotiv–Kuban Krasnodar**
  - **Krka Novo Mesto** (Slovenia) 79–65 (Belgium) Telenet Oostende
- NBA Playoffs (all series best-of-7; seeds in parentheses):
  - Western Conference First round:
    - Game 6 in Memphis: (8) Memphis Grizzlies 99, (1) San Antonio Spurs 91. **Grizzlies win series 4–2.**
      - The Grizzlies win a playoff series for the first time in franchise history, and also become only the second No. 8 seed to knock out a No. 1 seed since the NBA expanded the first round to best-of-seven.
- (Australia) NBL Grand Final (best-of-3 series):
  - Game 3 in Auckland: New Zealand Breakers 71–53 Cairns Taipans. **Breakers win series 2–1.**
    - The Breakers become the first team from New Zealand to capture an Australian national league title in any sport.

==== Cycling ====
- UCI World Tour:
  - Tour de Romandie, stage 3: (gold) Alexander Vinokourov (KAZ) (Astana) 3h 47' 55" (silver) Mikaël Cherel (FRA) (Ag2r–La Mondiale) s.t. (bronze) Tony Martin (GER) (HTC–Highroad) s.t.
    - General classification: (1) Pavel Brutt (RUS) (Team Katusha) 12h 31' 34" (2) Vinokourov + 32" (3) Damiano Cunego (ITA) (Lampre–ISD) + 38"

==== Equestrianism ====
- FEI World Cup Finals in Leipzig, Germany:
  - Show jumping – second competition: (gold) Eric Lamaze (CAN) on Hickstead (silver) Christian Ahlmann (GER) on Taloubet Z (bronze) Gerco Schröder (NED) on New Orleans
    - Provisional standings: (1) Ahlmann & Marco Kutscher (GER) 0 penalties (3) Schröder 1
  - Four-in-hand driving – first competition: (gold) Boyd Exell (AUS) (silver) Tomas Eriksson (SWE) (bronze) Koos de Ronde (NED)
  - Vaulting – first competition:
    - Women: (gold) Simone Wiegele (GER) (silver) Antje Hill (GER) (bronze) Anna Cavallaro (ITA)
    - Men: (gold) Nicolas Andréani (FRA) (silver) Patric Looser (SUI) (bronze) Viktor Brüsewitz (GER)
- FEI Nations Cup Show Jumping – Promotional League, Europe:
  - Nations Cup of Belgium (CSIO 4*) in Lummen: (gold) Germany (Janne Friederike Meyer, Heiko Schmidt, Holger Wulschner, Thomas Mühlbauer) (silver) France (bronze) Ireland

==== Figure skating ====
- World Championships in Moscow, Russia:
  - Ladies short program: (1) Kim Yuna (KOR) 65.91 points (2) Miki Ando (JPN) 65.58 (3) Ksenia Makarova (RUS) 61.62
  - Short dance: (1) Tessa Virtue/Scott Moir (CAN) 74.29 points (2) Meryl Davis/Charlie White (USA) 73.76 (3) Nathalie Péchalat/Fabian Bourzat (FRA) 70.97

==== Football (soccer) ====
- OFC Under-20 Championship in Auckland, New Zealand:
  - Third-place match: (bronze) **Vanuatu** 2–0 Fiji
  - Final: (gold) **New Zealand** 3–1 (silver) Solomon Islands
    - New Zealand win the title for the fourth time, and qualifies for FIFA U-20 World Cup.

==== Ice hockey ====
- Men's World Championship in Slovakia:
  - Group A in Bratislava:
    - Germany 2–0 Russia
    - Slovakia 3–1 Slovenia
  - Group B in Košice:
    - Switzerland 1–0 (OT) France
    - Belarus 1–4 Canada
- Stanley Cup playoffs (all series best-of-7; seeds in parentheses):
  - Eastern Conference Semifinals:
    - Game 1 in Washington: (5) Tampa Bay Lightning 4, (1) Washington Capitals 2. Lightning lead series 1–0.
  - Western Conference Semifinals:
    - Game 1 in San Jose: (2) San Jose Sharks 2, (3) Detroit Red Wings 1 (OT). Sharks lead series 1–0.

==== Rugby union ====
- Amlin Challenge Cup semi-finals:
  - **Stade Français** (France) 29–25 (France) Clermont

==== Snooker ====
- World Championship in Sheffield, England, semi-finals:
  - Judd Trump (ENG) 12–12 Ding Junhui (CHN)
  - Mark Williams (WAL) 9–7 John Higgins (SCO)

=== April 28, 2011 (Thursday) ===
==== American football ====
- Heisman Trophy winner Cam Newton of the Auburn Tigers is selected as the number one overall pick by the Carolina Panthers in the NFL draft in New York City.

==== Basketball ====
- NBA Playoffs (all series best-of-7; seeds in parentheses):
  - Eastern Conference First round:
    - Game 6 in Atlanta: (5) Atlanta Hawks 84, (4) Orlando Magic 81. **Hawks win series 4–2.**
  - Western Conference First round:
    - Game 6 in New Orleans: (2) Los Angeles Lakers 98, (7) New Orleans Hornets 80. **Lakers win series 4–2.**
    - Game 6 in Portland: (3) Dallas Mavericks 103, (6) Portland Trail Blazers 96. **Mavericks win series 4–2.**

==== Cricket ====
- Pakistan in the West Indies:
  - 3rd ODI in Bridgetown, Barbados: West Indies 171 (43.4/45 overs); Pakistan 177/7 (40.1 overs). **Pakistan win by 3 wickets; lead 5-match series 3–0.**

==== Cycling ====
- UCI World Tour:
  - Tour de Romandie, stage 2: (gold) Damiano Cunego (ITA) (Lampre–ISD) 4h 10' 53" (silver) Cadel Evans (AUS) (BMC Racing Team) + 2" (bronze) Alexander Vinokourov (KAZ) (Astana) + 2"
    - General classification: (1) Pavel Brutt (RUS) (Team Katusha) 8h 43' 39" (2) Cunego + 38" (3) Evans + 42"

==== Darts ====
- Premier League, week 12 in Liverpool, England (players in **bold** qualify for the playoffs):
  - Mark Webster (WAL) 4–8 Terry Jenkins (ENG)
  - **Gary Anderson** (SCO) 3–8 **Phil Taylor** (ENG)
  - Raymond van Barneveld (NED) 7–7 James Wade (ENG)
  - Simon Whitlock (AUS) 5–8 Adrian Lewis (ENG)
    - Standings (after 12 matches): Taylor 22 points, Anderson 16, van Barneveld 14, Lewis, Wade 11, Whitlock 10, Jenkins 8, Webster 4.

==== Equestrianism ====
- FEI World Cup Finals in Leipzig, Germany:
  - First competition – show jumping: (gold) Marco Kutscher (GER) on Cash (silver) Marcus Ehning (GER) on Sabrina (bronze) Christian Ahlmann (GER) on Taloubet Z

==== Figure skating ====
- World Championships in Moscow, Russia:
  - Men: (gold) Patrick Chan (CAN) 280.98 points (silver) Takahiko Kozuka (JPN) 258.41 (bronze) Artur Gachinski (RUS) 241.86
    - Chan wins his first world title.
  - Pairs: (gold) Aliona Savchenko/Robin Szolkowy (GER) 217.85 points (silver) Tatiana Volosozhar/Maxim Trankov (RUS) 210.73 (bronze) Pang Qing/Tong Jian (CHN) 204.12
    - Savchenko and Szolkowy win their third world title in four years.

==== Football (soccer) ====
- African Youth Championship in South Africa:
  - Semifinals:
    - Mali 0–2 **Nigeria**
    - Egypt 0–0 (2–4 pen.) **Cameroon**
- UEFA Europa League semi-finals, first leg:
  - Benfica (Portugal) 2–1 (Portugal) Braga
  - Porto (Portugal) 5–1 (Spain) Villarreal
    - Porto's Radamel Falcao scores four goals to set a record for a single UEFA Cup/Europa League campaign, with 16 goals.
- Copa Libertadores Round of 16, first leg:
  - Fluminense (Brazil) 3–1 (Paraguay) Libertad
  - Peñarol (Uruguay) 1–1 (Brazil) Internacional

==== Ice hockey ====
- Stanley Cup playoffs (all series best-of-7; seeds in parentheses):
  - Western Conference Semifinals:
    - Game 1 in Vancouver: (1) Vancouver Canucks 1, (5) Nashville Predators 0. Canucks lead series 1–0.

==== Snooker ====
- World Championship in Sheffield, England, semi-finals:
  - Judd Trump (ENG) 5–3 Ding Junhui (CHN)
  - Mark Williams (WAL) 5–3 John Higgins (SCO)

=== April 27, 2011 (Wednesday) ===
==== Basketball ====
- NBA Playoffs (all series best-of-7; seeds in parentheses):
  - Eastern Conference First round:
    - Game 5 in Miami: (2) Miami Heat 97, (7) Philadelphia 76ers 91. **Heat win series 4–1.**
  - Western Conference First round:
    - Game 5 in San Antonio: (1) San Antonio Spurs 110, (8) Memphis Grizzlies 103 (OT). Grizzlies lead series 3–2.
    - Game 5 in Oklahoma City: (4) Oklahoma City Thunder 100, (5) Denver Nuggets 97. **Thunder win series 4–1.**

==== Cycling ====
- UCI World Tour:
  - Tour de Romandie, stage 1: (gold) Pavel Brutt (RUS) (Team Katusha) 4h 27' 41" (silver) Oleksandr Kvachuk (UKR) (Lampre–ISD) + 56" (bronze) Branislau Samoilau (BLR) (Movistar Team) + 1' 15"
    - General classification: (1) Brutt 4h 31' 26" (2) Kvachuk + 1' 00" (3) Samoilau + 1' 22"

==== Figure skating ====
- World Championships in Moscow, Russia:
  - Men's short program: (1) Patrick Chan (CAN) 93.02 points (2) Nobunari Oda (JPN) 81.81 (3) Daisuke Takahashi (JPN) 80.25
  - Pairs short program: (1) Pang Qing/Tong Jian (CHN) 74.00 points (2) Aliona Savchenko/Robin Szolkowy (GER) 72.98 (3) Tatiana Volosozhar/Maxim Trankov (RUS) 70.35

==== Football (soccer) ====
- OFC Under-20 Championship in Auckland, New Zealand:
  - Semifinals:
    - Vanuatu 3–3 (2–3 pen.) **Solomon Islands**
    - **New Zealand** 6–0 Fiji
- UEFA Champions League semi-finals, first leg:
  - Real Madrid (Spain) 0–2 (Spain) Barcelona
- Copa Libertadores Round of 16, first leg:
  - Once Caldas (Colombia) 1–2 (Brazil) Cruzeiro
  - Chiapas (Mexico) 1–1 (Colombia) Junior
  - Estudiantes (Argentina) 0–0 (Paraguay) Cerro Porteño
  - Santos (Brazil) 1–0 (Mexico) América
- AFC Cup group stage, matchday 4 (team in **bold** advances to the knockout stage):
  - Group A:
    - **Nasaf Qarshi** (Uzbekistan) 9–0 (India) Dempo
    - Al-Ansar (Lebanon) 0–2 (Yemen) Al-Tilal
      - Standings (after 4 matches): Nasaf Qarshi 12 points, Al-Ansar 6, Dempo, Al-Tilal 3.
  - Group C:
    - Duhok (Iraq) 0–1 (Syria) Al-Jaish
    - Al-Nasr (Kuwait) 0–1 (Jordan) Al-Faisaly
      - Standings (after 4 matches): Al-Faisaly 9 points, Al-Jaish, Duhok 7, Al-Nasr 0.
  - Group E:
    - Al-Karamah (Syria) 3–2 (Lebanon) Al Ahed
    - Al-Oruba (Oman) 0–5 (Iraq) Arbil
      - Standings (after 4 matches): Arbil 8 points, Al-Karamah, Al-Oruba 5, Al Ahed 3.
  - Group G:
    - Victory (Maldives) 0–4 (Thailand) Muangthong United
    - Tampines Rovers (Singapore) 3–1 (Vietnam) Hà Nội T&T
      - Standings (after 4 matches): Muangthong United 10 points, Tampines Rovers 8, Hà Nội T&T 4, Victory 0.
- CONCACAF Champions League Finals, second leg (first leg score in parentheses):
  - Real Salt Lake (United States) 0–1 (2–2) (Mexico) **Monterrey**. Monterrey win 3–2 on aggregate.
    - Monterrey win the tournament for the first time.

==== Ice hockey ====
- Stanley Cup playoffs (all series best-of-7; seeds in parentheses):
  - Eastern Conference Quarterfinals:
    - Game 7 in Boston: (3) Boston Bruins 4, (6) Montreal Canadiens 3 (OT). **Bruins win series 4–3.**
    - Game 7 in Pittsburgh: (5) Tampa Bay Lightning 1, (4) Pittsburgh Penguins 0. **Lightning win series 4–3.**

==== Snooker ====
- World Championship in Sheffield, England, quarter-finals:
  - **Mark Williams** (WAL) 13–5 Mark Allen (NIR)
    - Williams reaches the semi-finals of the event for the first time since 2003.
  - **Judd Trump** (ENG) 13–5 Graeme Dott (SCO)
  - Ronnie O'Sullivan (ENG) 10–13 **John Higgins** (SCO)
  - **Ding Junhui** (CHN) 13–10 Mark Selby (ENG)
    - Ding becomes the first Chinese player to reach the semi-finals of the event.

=== April 26, 2011 (Tuesday) ===
==== Basketball ====
- NBA Playoffs (all series best-of-7; seeds in parentheses):
  - Eastern Conference First round:
    - Game 5 in Chicago: (1) Chicago Bulls 116, (8) Indiana Pacers 89. **Bulls win series 4–1.**
    - Game 5 in Orlando: (4) Orlando Magic 101, (5) Atlanta Hawks 76. Hawks lead series 3–2.
  - Western Conference First round:
    - Game 5 in Los Angeles: (2) Los Angeles Lakers 106, (7) New Orleans Hornets 90. Lakers lead series 3–2.

==== Cycling ====
- UCI World Tour:
  - Tour de Romandie, prologue & general classification: (gold) Jonathan Castroviejo (ESP) (Euskaltel–Euskadi) 3' 40" (silver) Taylor Phinney (USA) (BMC Racing Team) + 0" (bronze) Leigh Howard (AUS) (HTC–Highroad) + 1"

==== Football (soccer) ====
- UEFA Champions League semi-finals, first leg:
  - Schalke 04 (Germany) 0–2 (England) Manchester United
- Copa Libertadores Round of 16, first leg:
  - Grêmio (Brazil) 1–2 (Chile) Universidad Católica
  - Vélez Sarsfield (Argentina) 3–0 (Ecuador) LDU Quito
- AFC Cup group stage, matchday 4 (team in **bold** advances to the knockout stage):
  - Group B: Al-Ittihad (Syria) 0–0 (Uzbekistan) Shurtan Guzar
    - Standings (after 4 matches): (Kuwait) Al-Qadsia 10 points, Shurtan Guzar, Al-Ittihad 5, (Yemen) Al-Saqr 1.
  - Group D:
    - Al-Talaba (Iraq) 1–1 (Oman) Al-Suwaiq
    - **Al-Wehdat** (Jordan) 1–0 Al-Kuwait
      - Standings (after 4 matches): Al-Wehdat 12 points, Al-Kuwait 6, Al-Talaba 4, Al-Suwaiq 1.
  - Group F:
    - Sông Lam Nghệ An (Vietnam) 4–0 (Indonesia) Sriwijaya
    - TSW Pegasus (Hong Kong) 3–0 (Maldives) VB
      - Standings (after 4 matches): TSW Pegasus 9 points, Sriwijaya 7, Sông Lam Nghệ An 6, VB 1.
  - Group H:
    - Kingfisher East Bengal (India) 3–3 (Hong Kong) South China
    - Chonburi (Thailand) 4–1 (Indonesia) Persipura Jayapura
      - Standings (after 4 matches): Chonburi, Persipura Jayapura 7 points, South China 5, Kingfisher East Bengal 2.
- (Northern Ireland) IFA Premiership, matchday 37 (team in **bold** qualifies for the UEFA Champions League, teams in italics qualify for the UEFA Europa League):
  - Cliftonville 3–0 Crusaders
  - Lisburn Distillery 0–4 **Linfield**
    - Standings: Linfield 82 points, Crusaders 73, Glentoran 65, Cliftonville 58.
    - Linfield retain their title and win it for the 50th time.

==== Ice hockey ====
- Stanley Cup playoffs (all series best-of-7; seeds in parentheses):
  - Eastern Conference Quarterfinals:
    - Game 7 in Philadelphia: (2) Philadelphia Flyers 5, (7) Buffalo Sabres 2. **Flyers win series 4–3.**
    - Game 6 in Montreal: (6) Montreal Canadiens 2, (3) Boston Bruins 1. Series tied 3–3.
  - Western Conference Quarterfinals:
    - Game 7 in Vancouver: (1) Vancouver Canucks 2, (8) Chicago Blackhawks 1 (OT). **Canucks win series 4–3.**

==== Snooker ====
- World Championship in Sheffield, England, quarter-finals:
  - Judd Trump (ENG) 11–5 Graeme Dott (SCO)
  - Mark Williams (WAL) 11–5 Mark Allen (NIR)
  - Ding Junhui (CHN) 5–3 Mark Selby (ENG)
  - Ronnie O'Sullivan (ENG) 4–4 John Higgins (SCO)

=== April 25, 2011 (Monday) ===
==== American football ====
- A U.S. federal judge issues an injunction against the NFL, which temporarily ends the league's lockout of its players. The NFL appeals the decision and asks for the injunction to be stayed pending appeal.

==== Basketball ====
- NBA Playoffs (all series best-of-7; seeds in parentheses):
  - Western Conference First round:
    - Game 4 in Memphis: (8) Memphis Grizzlies 104, (1) San Antonio Spurs 86. Grizzlies lead series 3–1.
    - Game 5 in Dallas: (3) Dallas Mavericks 93, (6) Portland Trail Blazers 82. Mavericks lead series 3–2.
    - Game 4 in Denver: (5) Denver Nuggets 104, (4) Oklahoma City Thunder 101. Thunder lead series 3–1.

==== Cricket ====
- Pakistan in the West Indies:
  - 2nd ODI in Gros Islet, Saint Lucia: West Indies 220 (50 overs); Pakistan 223/3 (48 overs; Ahmed Shehzad 102). **Pakistan win by 7 wickets; lead 5-match series 2–0.**

==== Equestrianism ====
- Badminton Horse Trials (CCI 4*) in Badminton, Gloucestershire, England: (gold) Mark Todd (NZL) on Land Vision (silver) Piggy French (GBR) on Jakata (bronze) Mary King (GBR) on Imperial Cavalier
  - Todd wins the event for the fourth time, and his first since 1996.

==== Football (soccer) ====
- OFC Under-20 Championship in Auckland, New Zealand (teams in **bold** advance to the semifinals):
  - Group A:
    - **Fiji** 5–1 American Samoa
    - Papua New Guinea 2–5 **Vanuatu**
      - Final standings: Vanuatu 9 points, Fiji, Papua New Guinea 4, American Samoa 0.
  - Group B: **New Zealand** 10–0 New Caledonia
    - Final standings: New Zealand 6 points, **Solomon Islands** 3, New Caledonia 0.
- Liechtenstein Cup Final in Vaduz: **Vaduz** 5–0 Eschen Mauren
  - Vaduz defeat Eschen Mauren in the final for the third successive year, to win the Cup for the 14th successive year and the 40th time overall.

==== Ice hockey ====
- Women's World Championship in Switzerland:
  - Bronze medal game: (bronze) **Finland** 3–2 (OT) Russia
  - Final: (silver) Canada 2–3 (OT) (gold) **United States**
    - The United States defeat Canada in the final for the third successive time, to win their fourth world title.
- Stanley Cup playoffs (all series best-of-7; seeds in parentheses):
  - Eastern Conference Quarterfinals:
    - Game 6 in Tampa: (5) Tampa Bay Lightning 4, (4) Pittsburgh Penguins 2. Series tied 3–3.
  - Western Conference Quarterfinals:
    - Game 6 in Los Angeles: (2) San Jose Sharks 4, (7) Los Angeles Kings 3 (OT). **Sharks win series 4–2.**

==== Snooker ====
- World Championship in Sheffield, England, last 16:
  - Stephen Hendry (SCO) 4–13 **Mark Selby** (ENG)
    - Selby compiles six century breaks; the first player to do so at the Crucible, in a best of 25 match.
  - Rory McLeod (ENG) 7–13 **John Higgins** (SCO)
  - **Ding Junhui** (CHN) 13–12 Stuart Bingham (ENG)
    - Ding reaches the quarter-finals of the event for the first time.
  - Shaun Murphy (ENG) 10–13 **Ronnie O'Sullivan** (ENG)

=== April 24, 2011 (Sunday) ===
==== Auto racing ====
- World Touring Car Championship:
  - Race of Belgium in Heusden-Zolder:
    - Race 1: (1) Robert Huff (GBR) (Chevrolet; Chevrolet Cruze) (2) Alain Menu (SUI) (Chevrolet; Chevrolet Cruze) (3) Yvan Muller (FRA) (Chevrolet; Chevrolet Cruze)
    - Race 2: (1) Gabriele Tarquini (ITA) (Lukoil – SUNRED; SEAT León) (2) Menu (3) Tiago Monteiro (POR) (SUNRED Engineering; SEAT León)
      - Drivers' championship standings (after 2 of 12 rounds): (1) Huff 70 points (2) Menu 69 (3) Tarquini 51

==== Basketball ====
- NBA Playoffs (all series best-of-7; seeds in parentheses):
  - Eastern Conference First round:
    - Game 4 in Philadelphia: (7) Philadelphia 76ers 86, (2) Miami Heat 82. Heat lead series 3–1.
    - Game 4 in New York: (3) Boston Celtics 101, (6) New York Knicks 89. **Celtics win series 4–0.**
    - Game 4 in Atlanta: (5) Atlanta Hawks 88, (4) Orlando Magic 85. Hawks lead series 3–1.
  - Western Conference First round:
    - Game 4 in New Orleans: (7) New Orleans Hornets 93, (2) Los Angeles Lakers 88. Series tied 2–2.

==== Cycling ====
- UCI World Tour:
  - Liège–Bastogne–Liège: (gold) Philippe Gilbert (BEL) (Omega Pharma–Lotto) 6h 13' 18" (silver) Fränk Schleck (LUX) (Leopard Trek) s.t. (bronze) Andy Schleck (LUX) (Leopard Trek) s.t.
    - Gilbert becomes only the second rider to win the three Ardennes classics in the same season.
    - World Tour standings (after 12 of 27 races): (1) Gilbert 356 points (2) Fabian Cancellara (SUI) (Leopard Trek) 236 (3) Matthew Goss (AUS) (HTC–Highroad) 203

==== Football (soccer) ====
- African Youth Championship in South Africa: (teams in **bold** advance to the semifinals and qualify for FIFA U-20 World Cup)
  - Group B:
    - Ghana 1–1 **Cameroon**
    - **Nigeria** 2–0 Gambia
      - Final standings: Cameroon 7 points, Nigeria 6, Ghana 2, Gambia 1.
- CAF Champions League Second round, first leg: Al-Hilal (Sudan) 1–0 (Tunisia) Club Africain
- CAF Confederation Cup Second round, first leg:
  - FUS Rabat (Morocco) 1–1 (Angola) 1º de Agosto
  - Maghreb Fez (Morocco) 5–1 (Sudan) Al-Khartoum
  - Saint Eloi Lupopo (Democratic Republic of the Congo) 2–1 (Kenya) Sofapaka
  - Difaa El Jadida (Morocco) 3–0 (Madagascar) AS Adema
  - Sunshine Stars (Nigeria) 2–0 (Burkina Faso) USFA
  - Haras El Hodood (Egypt) 2–1 (Democratic Republic of the Congo) Motema Pembe

==== Golf ====
- PGA Tour:
  - The Heritage in Hilton Head Island, South Carolina:
    - Winner: Brandt Snedeker (USA) 272 (−12)^{PO}
      - Snedeker defeats Luke Donald (ENG) on the third playoff hole, to win his second PGA Tour title and first since 2007. Snedeker's playoff win also denies Donald the number 1 spot in the world rankings, with Lee Westwood (ENG) replacing Martin Kaymer (GER) at the top.
- European Tour:
  - Volvo China Open in Suzhou, China:
    - Winner: Nicolas Colsaerts (BEL) 264 (−24)
      - Colsaerts becomes the second Belgian to win a European Tour tournament, after Philippe Toussaint in 1974.
- Champions Tour:
  - Liberty Mutual Legends of Golf in Savannah, Georgia:
    - Winners: David Eger (USA) & Mark McNulty (ZIM) 189 (−27)^{PO}
      - Eger and McNulty defeat Scott Hoch (USA) & Kenny Perry (USA) on the second playoff hole; Eger wins his fourth Champions Tour title and McNulty wins his eighth.

==== Ice hockey ====
- Women's World Championship in Switzerland:
  - 5th place game: **Sweden** 3–2 (SO) Switzerland
  - Relegation series, game 2: Kazakhstan 1–2 (SO) Slovakia. **Slovakia win best-of-3 series 2–0.**
- World U18 Championships in Germany:
  - Bronze medal game: (bronze) **Russia** 6–4 Canada
  - Final: (silver) Sweden 3–4 (OT) (gold) **United States**
    - The United States win their third consecutive world title, and their sixth overall.
- Stanley Cup playoffs (all series best-of-7; seeds in parentheses):
  - Eastern Conference Quarterfinals:
    - Game 6 in Buffalo: (2) Philadelphia Flyers 5, (7) Buffalo Sabres 4 (OT). Series tied 3–3.
  - Western Conference Quarterfinals:
    - Game 6 in Chicago: (8) Chicago Blackhawks 4, (1) Vancouver Canucks 3 (OT). Series tied 3–3.
    - Game 6 in Nashville: (5) Nashville Predators 4, (4) Anaheim Ducks 2. **Predators win series 4–2.**

==== Judo ====
- European Championships in Istanbul, Turkey:
  - Men's team: (gold) Ukraine (silver) France (bronze) Georgia & Germany
  - Women's team: (gold) France (silver) Germany (bronze) Turkey & Ukraine

==== Snooker ====
- World Championship in Sheffield, England, last 16:
  - Shaun Murphy (ENG) 7–9 Ronnie O'Sullivan (ENG)
  - Stephen Hendry (SCO) 4–12 Mark Selby (ENG)
  - Ding Junhui (CHN) 7–9 Stuart Bingham (ENG)
  - Rory McLeod (ENG) 5–10 John Higgins (SCO)

==== Surfing ====
- Men's World Tour:
  - Rip Curl Pro at the Bells Beach, Australia: (1) Joel Parkinson (AUS) (2) Mick Fanning (AUS) (3) Adriano De Souza (BRA) & Jordy Smith (RSA)
    - Standings (after 2 of 11 events): (1) Kelly Slater (USA) 15,200 points (2) Joel Parkinson (AUS) 14,000 (3) Smith 13,000

==== Tennis ====
- ATP World Tour:
  - Barcelona Open Banco Sabadell in Barcelona, Spain:
    - Final: **Rafael Nadal** (ESP) def. David Ferrer (ESP) 6–2, 6–4
      - Nadal wins the event for the sixth time in seven years, and the 45th title of his career.
- WTA Tour:
  - Porsche Tennis Grand Prix in Stuttgart, Germany:
    - Final: **Julia Görges** (GER) def. Caroline Wozniacki (DEN) 7–6(3), 6–3
      - Görges wins her second WTA Tour title.
  - Grand Prix SAR La Princesse Lalla Meryem in Fes, Morocco:
    - Final: **Alberta Brianti** (ITA) def. Simona Halep (ROU) 6–4, 6–3
      - Brianti wins her first WTA Tour title.

=== April 23, 2011 (Saturday) ===
==== Auto racing ====
- Nationwide Series:
  - Nashville 300 in Gladeville, Tennessee: (1) (Missouri) Carl Edwards (Ford; Roush Fenway Racing) (2) (Nevada) Kyle Busch (Toyota; Joe Gibbs Racing) (3) (Michigan) Brad Keselowski (Dodge; Penske Racing)
    - Drivers' championship standings (after 8 of 34 races): (1) (Illinois) Justin Allgaier (Chevrolet; Turner Motorsports) & (Mississippi) Ricky Stenhouse Jr. (Ford; Roush Fenway Racing) 264 points (3) (California) Jason Leffler (Chevrolet; Turner Motorsports) 262

==== Basketball ====
- NBA Playoffs (all series best-of-7; seeds in parentheses):
  - Eastern Conference First round:
    - Game 4 in Indianapolis: (8) Indiana Pacers 89, (1) Chicago Bulls 84. Bulls lead series 3–1.
  - Western Conference First round:
    - Game 3 in Memphis: (8) Memphis Grizzlies 91, (1) San Antonio Spurs 88. Grizzlies lead series 2–1.
    - Game 4 in Portland: (6) Portland Trail Blazers 84, (3) Dallas Mavericks 82. Series tied 2–2.
    - Game 3 in Denver: (4) Oklahoma City Thunder 97, (5) Denver Nuggets 94. Thunder lead series 3–0.

==== Cricket ====
- Pakistan in the West Indies:
  - 1st ODI in Gros Islet, Saint Lucia: West Indies 221/6 (50 overs); Pakistan 222/2 (41.3 overs). **Pakistan win by 8 wickets; lead 5-match series 1–0.**

==== Curling ====
- World Mixed Doubles Championship in Saint Paul, Minnesota, United States:
  - Semifinals:
    - Sweden 7–9 **Russia**
    - **Switzerland** 8–3 France
  - Bronze medal game: Sweden 6–8 (bronze) **France**
  - Final: (gold) **Switzerland** 11–2 (silver) Russia
    - Switzerland win the title for the third time.
- World Senior Men's Championship in Saint Paul, Minnesota, United States:
  - Semifinals:
    - **Canada** 11–1 Australia
    - **United States** 11–2 Denmark
  - Bronze medal game: (bronze) **Australia** 8–5 Denmark
  - Final: (gold) **Canada** 5–4 (silver) United States
    - Canada win the title for the seventh time.
- World Senior Women's Championship in Saint Paul, Minnesota, United States:
  - Semifinals:
    - **Canada** 6–5 Switzerland
    - United States 5–7 **Sweden**
  - Bronze medal game: United States 4–5 (bronze) **Switzerland**
  - Final: (gold) **Canada** 9–2 (silver) Sweden
    - Canada win the title for the fourth successive time and seventh time overall.

==== Football (soccer) ====
- African Youth Championship in South Africa: (teams in **bold** advance to the semifinals and qualify for FIFA U-20 World Cup)
  - Group A:
    - South Africa 0–1 **Egypt**
    - **Mali** 1–1 Lesotho
      - Final standings: Mali 7 points, Egypt 6, South Africa 3, Lesotho 1.
- OFC Under-20 Championship in Auckland, New Zealand (team in **bold** advances to the semifinals):
  - Group A:
    - Fiji 0–2 **Vanuatu**
    - American Samoa 1–5 Papua New Guinea
      - Standings (after 2 matches): Vanuatu 6 points, Papua New Guinea 4, Fiji 1, American Samoa 0.
  - Group B: Solomon Islands 0–3 New Zealand
    - Standings: New Zealand 3 points (1 match), Solomon Islands 3 (2), New Caledonia 0 (1).
- CAF Champions League Second round, first leg:
  - Inter Luanda (Angola) 1–1 (Algeria) MC Alger
  - Espérance ST (Tunisia) 5–0 (Senegal) Diaraf
  - Wydad Casablanca (Morocco) 1–0 (Democratic Republic of the Congo) TP Mazembe
  - ZESCO United (Zambia) 0–0 (Egypt) Al-Ahly
- CAF Confederation Cup Second round, first leg:
  - Missile (Gabon) 3–0 (Algeria) JS Kabylie
  - Kaduna United (Nigeria) – (Tunisia) Étoile Sahel postponed
- (Croatia) Prva HNL, matchday 26 (team in **bold** qualifies for the UEFA Champions League):
  - **Dinamo Zagreb** 1–0 Osijek
  - Slaven Belupo 1–2 Hajduk Split
    - Standings: Dinamo Zagreb 64 points, Hajduk Split 51, RNK Split 43.
    - Dinamo Zagreb win the title for the sixth successive time, and 13th time overall.
- (France) Coupe de la Ligue Final in Saint-Denis: **Marseille** 1–0 Montpellier
  - Marseille win the Cup for the second successive time.
- (Portugal) Taça da Liga Final in Coimbra: Paços de Ferreira 1–2 **Benfica**
  - Benfica win the Cup for the third successive time.
- (Finland) Finnish League Cup Final in Espoo: **FC Honka** 3–0 Tampere United
  - FC Honka win the Cup for the second successive time.

==== Ice hockey ====
- Women's World Championship in Switzerland:
  - Semifinals:
    - **Canada** 4–1 Finland
    - **United States** 5–1 Russia
- World U18 Championships in Germany:
  - Semifinals:
    - **Sweden** 3–1 Russia
    - **United States** 5–4 (OT) Canada
  - 5th place game: **Finland** 6–0 Germany
  - Relegation Round:
    - Slovakia 2–6 Norway
    - Switzerland 4–2 Czech Republic
      - Final standings: Switzerland 9 points, Czech Republic 6, Norway 3, Slovakia 0.
- Stanley Cup playoffs (all series best-of-7; seeds in parentheses):
  - Eastern Conference Quarterfinals:
    - Game 5 in Washington: (1) Washington Capitals 3, (8) New York Rangers 1. **Capitals win series 4–1.**
    - Game 5 in Boston: (3) Boston Bruins 2, (6) Montreal Canadiens 1 (2OT). Bruins lead series 3–2.
    - Game 5 in Pittsburgh: (5) Tampa Bay Lightning 8, (4) Pittsburgh Penguins 2. Penguins lead series 3–2.
  - Western Conference Quarterfinals:
    - Game 5 in San Jose: (7) Los Angeles Kings 3, (2) San Jose Sharks 1. Sharks lead series 3–2.

==== Judo ====
- European Championships in Istanbul, Turkey:
  - Men:
    - −90 kg: (gold) Ilias Iliadis (GRE) (silver) Kirill Denisov (RUS) (bronze) Varlam Liparteliani (GEO) & Marcus Nyman (SWE)
    - −100 kg: (gold) Amel Mekić (BIH) (silver) Levan Zhorzholiani (GEO) (bronze) Jevgeņijs Borodavko (LAT) & Irakli Tsirekidze (GEO)
    - +100 kg: (gold) Teddy Riner (FRA) (silver) Barna Bor (HUN) (bronze) Martin Padar (EST) & Janusz Wojnarowicz (POL)
  - Women:
    - −78 kg: (gold) Audrey Tcheumeo (FRA) (silver) Lucie Louette (FRA) (bronze) Luise Malzahn (GER) & Ana Velensek (SLO)
    - +78 kg: (gold) Elena Ivashchenko (RUS) (silver) Anne Sophie Mondiere (FRA) (bronze) Tea Donguzashvili (RUS) & Lucija Polavder (SLO)

==== Snooker ====
- World Championship in Sheffield, England, last 16:
  - **Judd Trump** (ENG) 13–6 Martin Gould (ENG)
  - **Graeme Dott** (SCO) 13–11 Ali Carter (ENG)
  - **Mark Allen** (NIR) 13–12 Barry Hawkins (ENG)
  - Shaun Murphy (ENG) 2–6 Ronnie O'Sullivan (ENG)
  - Stephen Hendry (SCO) 1–7 Mark Selby (ENG)

==== Surfing ====
- Women's World Tour:
  - Rip Curl Women's Pro at Bells Beach, Australia: (1) Sally Fitzgibbons (AUS) (2) Carissa Moore (USA) (3) Silvana Lima (BRA) & Stephanie Gilmore (AUS)
    - Standings (standings after 2 of 7 events): (1) Moore 18,000 points (2) Fitzgibbons 16,500 (3) Tyler Wright (AUS) 13,200

=== April 22, 2011 (Friday) ===
==== Basketball ====
- NBA Playoffs (all series best-of-7; seeds in parentheses):
  - Eastern Conference First round:
    - Game 3 in New York: (3) Boston Celtics 113, (6) New York Knicks 96. Celtics lead series 3–0.
    - Game 3 in Atlanta: (5) Atlanta Hawks 88, (4) Orlando Magic 84. Hawks lead series 2–1.
  - Western Conference First round:
    - Game 3 in New Orleans: (2) Los Angeles Lakers 100, (7) New Orleans Hornets 86. Lakers lead series 2–1.

==== Ice hockey ====
- Women's World Championship in Switzerland:
  - Quarterfinals:
    - Sweden 1–5 **Finland**
    - Switzerland 4–5 (OT) **Russia**
  - Relegation series, game 1: Slovakia 1–0 Kazakhstan. Slovakia lead best-of-3 series 1–0.
- Stanley Cup playoffs (all series best-of-7; seeds in parentheses):
  - Eastern Conference Quarterfinals:
    - Game 5 in Philadelphia: (7) Buffalo Sabres 4, (2) Philadelphia Flyers 3 (OT). Sabres lead series 3–2.
  - Western Conference Quarterfinals:
    - Game 5 in Anaheim: (5) Nashville Predators 4, (4) Anaheim Ducks 3 (OT). Predators lead series 3–2.

==== Judo ====
- European Championships in Istanbul, Turkey:
  - Men:
    - −73 kg: (gold) João Pina (POR) (silver) Murat Kodzokov (RUS) (bronze) Jaromír Ježek (CZE) & Hasan Vanlıoğlu (TUR)
    - −81 kg: (gold) Elnur Mammadli (AZE) (silver) Sergiu Toma (MDA) (bronze) Ole Bischof (GER) & Sirazhudin Magomedov (RUS)
  - Women:
    - −63 kg: (gold) Gévrise Émane (FRA) (silver) Anicka van Emden (NED) (bronze) Hilde Drexler (AUT) & Urška Žolnir (SLO)
    - −70 kg: (gold) Edith Bosch (NED) (silver) Cecilia Blanco (ESP) (bronze) Erica Barbieri (ITA) & Lucie Décosse (FRA)

==== Snooker ====
- World Championship in Sheffield, England, last 16:
  - **Mark Williams** (WAL) 13–4 Jamie Cope (ENG)
  - Judd Trump (ENG) 11–5 Martin Gould (ENG)
  - Graeme Dott (SCO) 8–8 Ali Carter (ENG)
  - Mark Allen (NIR) 3–5 Barry Hawkins (ENG)

=== April 21, 2011 (Thursday) ===
==== Basketball ====
- NBA Playoffs (all series best-of-7; seeds in parentheses):
  - Eastern Conference First round:
    - Game 3 in Indianapolis: (1) Chicago Bulls 88, (8) Indiana Pacers 84. Bulls lead series 3–0.
    - Game 3 in Philadelphia: (2) Miami Heat 100, (7) Philadelphia 76ers 94. Heat lead series 3–0.
  - Western Conference First round:
    - Game 3 in Portland: (6) Portland Trail Blazers 97, (3) Dallas Mavericks 92. Mavericks lead series 2–1.

==== Cricket ====
- Pakistan in the West Indies:
  - Only T20I in Gros Islet, Saint Lucia: West Indies 150/7 (20 overs); Pakistan 143/9 (20 overs). **West Indies win by 7 runs.**

==== Darts ====
- Premier League, week 11 in Birmingham, England (player in **bold** qualifies for the playoffs):
  - James Wade (ENG) 8–1 Mark Webster (WAL)
  - Terry Jenkins (ENG) 7–7 Raymond van Barneveld (NED)
  - Simon Whitlock (AUS) 6–8 Gary Anderson (SCO)
  - **Phil Taylor** (ENG) 8–3 Adrian Lewis (ENG)
    - Standings (after 11 matches): Taylor 20 points, Anderson 16, van Barneveld 13, Whitlock, Wade 10, Lewis 9, Jenkins 6, Webster 4.

==== Football (soccer) ====
- African Youth Championship in South Africa (team in **bold** advances to the semifinals and qualifies for FIFA U-20 World Cup):
  - Group B:
    - Nigeria 0–1 **Cameroon**
    - Gambia 1–1 Ghana
      - Standings (after 2 matches): Cameroon 6 points, Nigeria 3, Ghana, Gambia 1.
- OFC Under-20 Championship in Auckland, New Zealand:
  - Group A:
    - Vanuatu 7–0 American Samoa
    - Fiji 0–0 Papua New Guinea
  - Group B: New Caledonia 1–3 Solomon Islands
- (Denmark) Superliga, matchday 26 (team in **bold** qualifies for the UEFA Champions League):
  - Odense 1–2 Nordsjælland
  - Lyngby 1–2 **Copenhagen**
    - Standings: Copenhagen 67 points, Odense 41, Brøndby 39.
    - Copenhagen win the title for the fifth time in six years, and the ninth time overall.

==== Ice hockey ====
- World U18 Championships in Germany:
  - Quarterfinals:
    - **Russia** 5–2 Finland
    - **Canada** 4–3 Germany
  - Relegation Round:
    - Switzerland 4–1 Norway
    - Czech Republic 4–3 Slovakia
      - Standings (after 2 games): Switzerland, Czech Republic 6 points, Slovakia, Norway 0.
      - Slovakia and Norway are relegated to Division I in 2012.
- Stanley Cup playoffs (all series best-of-7; seeds in parentheses):
  - Eastern Conference Quarterfinals:
    - Game 4 in Montreal: (3) Boston Bruins 5, (6) Montreal Canadiens 4 (OT). Series tied 2–2.
  - Western Conference Quarterfinals:
    - Game 5 in Vancouver: (8) Chicago Blackhawks 5, (1) Vancouver Canucks 0. Canucks lead series 3–2.
    - Game 4 in Los Angeles: (2) San Jose Sharks 6, (7) Los Angeles Kings 3. Sharks lead series 3–1.

==== Judo ====
- European Championships in Istanbul, Turkey:
  - Men:
    - −60 kg: (gold) Georgii Zantaraia (UKR) (silver) Betkil Shukvani (GEO) (bronze) Arsen Galstyan (RUS) & Elio Verde (ITA)
    - −66 kg: (gold) Miklós Ungvári (HUN) (silver) Tarian Karimov (AZE) (bronze) Alim Gadanov (RUS) & Colin Oates (GBR)
  - Women:
    - −48 kg: (gold) Alina Alexandra Dumitru (ROM) (silver) Éva Csernoviczki (HUN) (bronze) Frédérique Jossinet (FRA) & Laetitia Payet (FRA)
    - −52 kg: (gold) Pénélope Bonna (FRA) (silver) Joana Ramos (POR) (bronze) Ana Carrascosa (ESP) & Sophie Cox (GBR)
    - −57 kg: (gold) Sabrina Filzmoser (AUT) (silver) Telma Monteiro (POR) (bronze) Corina Oana Caprioriu (ROM) & Irina Zabludina (RUS)

==== Snooker ====
- World Championship in Sheffield, England:
  - Last 32:
    - **John Higgins** (SCO) 10–5 Stephen Lee (ENG)
    - **Mark Selby** (ENG) 10–1 Jimmy Robertson (ENG)
  - Last 16:
    - Mark Williams (WAL) 7–1 Jamie Cope (ENG)
    - Judd Trump (ENG) 5–3 Martin Gould (ENG)

=== April 20, 2011 (Wednesday) ===
==== Baseball ====
- Major League Baseball news: Commissioner Bud Selig announces that MLB will take over the day-to-day operations of the Los Angeles Dodgers due to financial and governance issues caused by the bitter divorce of owners Frank and Jamie McCourt.

==== Basketball ====
- NBA Playoffs (all series best-of-7; seeds in parentheses):
  - Western Conference First round:
    - Game 2 in Oklahoma City: (4) Oklahoma City Thunder 106, (5) Denver Nuggets 89. Thunder lead series 2–0.
    - Game 2 in San Antonio: (1) San Antonio Spurs 93, (8) Memphis Grizzlies 87. Series tied 1–1.
    - Game 2 in Los Angeles: (2) Los Angeles Lakers 87, (7) New Orleans Hornets 78. Series tied 1–1.

==== Cycling ====
- UCI World Tour:
  - La Flèche Wallonne: (gold) Philippe Gilbert (BEL) (Omega Pharma–Lotto) 4h 54' 57" (silver) Joaquim Rodríguez (ESP) (Team Katusha) + 3" (bronze) Samuel Sánchez (ESP) (Euskaltel–Euskadi) + 5"
    - World Tour standings (after 11 of 27 races): (1) Gilbert 256 points (2) Fabian Cancellara (SUI) (Leopard Trek) 236 (3) Matthew Goss (AUS) (HTC–Highroad) 203

==== Football (soccer) ====
- Friendly international: (top 10 in FIFA World Rankings)
  - (5) Argentina 2–2 Ecuador
- African Youth Championship in South Africa (team in **bold** advances to the semifinals and qualifies for FIFA U-20 World Cup):
  - Group A:
    - Lesotho 1–2 South Africa
    - **Mali** 1–0 Egypt
      - Standings (after 2 matches): Mali 6 points, Egypt, South Africa 3, Lesotho 0.
- Copa Libertadores second stage (teams in **bold** advance to the knockout stage):
  - Group 3:
    - Nacional (Uruguay) 0–0 (Mexico) **América**
    - Argentinos Juniors (Argentina) 2–4 (Brazil) **Fluminense**
      - Final standings: América 10 points, Fluminense, Nacional 8, Argentinos Juniors 7.
  - Group 5:
    - Colo-Colo (Chile) 2–3 (Paraguay) **Cerro Porteño**
    - **Santos** (Brazil) 3–1 (Venezuela) Deportivo Táchira
      - Final standings: Cerro Porteño, Santos 11 points, Colo-Colo 9, Deportivo Táchira 2.
- AFC Champions League group stage, matchday 4 (teams in **bold** advance to the knockout stage):
  - Group A:
    - Al-Gharafa (Qatar) 1–0 (Iran) Sepahan
    - Al-Jazira (United Arab Emirates) 2–3 (Saudi Arabia) Al-Hilal
      - Standings (after 4 matches): Sepahan, Al-Hilal 9 points, Al-Gharafa 4, Al-Jazira 1.
  - Group C:
    - Persepolis (Iran) 1–3 (Uzbekistan) Bunyodkor
    - **Al-Ittihad** (Saudi Arabia) 0–0 (United Arab Emirates) Al-Wahda
      - Standings (after 4 matches): Al-Ittihad 10 points, Bunyodkor 5, Al-Wahda 3, Persepolis 2.
  - Group E:
    - Melbourne Victory (Australia) 2–1 (China) Tianjin Teda
    - Gamba Osaka (Japan) 3–1 (South Korea) Jeju United
      - Standings (after 4 matches): Gamba Osaka 8 points, Tianjin Teda 7, Jeju United 6, Melbourne Victory 4.
  - Group G:
    - Shandong Luneng (China) 5–0 (Indonesia) Arema
    - Jeonbuk Hyundai Motors (South Korea) 1–0 (Japan) Cerezo Osaka
      - Standings (after 4 matches): Jeonbuk Hyundai Motors 9 points, Shandong Luneng 7, Cerezo Osaka 6, Arema 1.
- CONCACAF Champions League Finals, first leg:
  - Monterrey (Mexico) 2–2 (United States) Real Salt Lake
- (Spain) Copa del Rey Final in Valencia: FC Barcelona 0–1 (a.e.t.) **Real Madrid**
  - Real Madrid win their first Copa del Rey since 1993, and their 18th overall.

==== Ice hockey ====
- Women's World Championship in Switzerland: (team in **bold** advances to the semifinals, teams in italics advance to the quarterfinals)
  - Group A:
    - Slovakia 1–4 Russia
    - **United States** 9–1 Sweden
      - Final standings: United States 9 points, Sweden 6, Russia 3, Slovakia 0.
- Stanley Cup playoffs (all series best-of-7; seeds in parentheses):
  - Eastern Conference Quarterfinals:
    - Game 4 in New York: (1) Washington Capitals 4, (8) New York Rangers 3 (2OT). Capitals lead series 3–1.
    - Game 4 in Buffalo: (7) Buffalo Sabres 1, (2) Philadelphia Flyers 0. Series tied 2–2.
    - Game 4 in Tampa: (4) Pittsburgh Penguins 3, (5) Tampa Bay Lightning 2 (2OT). Penguins lead series 3–1.
  - Western Conference Quarterfinals:
    - Game 4 in Glendale, Arizona: (3) Detroit Red Wings 6, (6) Phoenix Coyotes 3. **Red Wings win series 4–0.**
    - Game 4 in Nashville: (4) Anaheim Ducks 6, (5) Nashville Predators 3. Series tied 2–2.

==== Snooker ====
- World Championship in Sheffield, England, last 32:
  - Marco Fu (HKG) 8–10 **Martin Gould** (ENG)
  - Ricky Walden (ENG) 6–10 **Rory McLeod** (ENG)
    - McLeod reaches the last 16 of the event for the first time.
  - **Graeme Dott** (SCO) 10–7 Mark King (ENG)
  - **Mark Allen** (NIR) 10–9 Matthew Stevens (WAL)
  - John Higgins (SCO) 6–3 Stephen Lee (ENG)
  - Mark Selby (ENG) 8–1 Jimmy Robertson (ENG)

==== U.S. college sports ====
- Conference realignment: The University of Massachusetts Amherst (UMass) announces that it will upgrade its football program from Division I FCS to FBS and accept an invitation to become a football-only member of the Mid-American Conference effective in 2012.

=== April 19, 2011 (Tuesday) ===
==== Basketball ====
- NBA Playoffs (all series best-of-7; seeds in parentheses):
  - Eastern Conference First round:
    - Game 2 in Boston: (3) Boston Celtics 96, (6) New York Knicks 93. Celtics lead series 2–0.
    - Game 2 in Orlando: (4) Orlando Magic 88, (5) Atlanta Hawks 82. Series tied 1–1.
  - Western Conference First round:
    - Game 2 in Dallas: (3) Dallas Mavericks 101, (6) Portland Trail Blazers 89. Mavericks lead series 2–0.

==== Football (soccer) ====
- Copa Libertadores second stage (teams in **bold** advance to the knockout stage):
  - Group 1:
    - **Libertad** (Paraguay) 2–0 (Mexico) San Luis
    - Universidad San Martín (Peru) 0–2 (Colombia) **Once Caldas**
      - Final standings: Libertad 14 points, Once Caldas 7, Universidad San Martín 6, San Luis 5.
  - Group 6:
    - Jorge Wilstermann (Bolivia) 2–1 (Mexico) **Chiapas**
    - **Internacional** (Brazil) 2–0 (Ecuador) Emelec
      - Final standings: Internacional 13 points, Jaguares 9, Emelec 8, Jorge Wilstermann 4.
- AFC Champions League group stage, matchday 4:
  - Group B:
    - Pakhtakor (Uzbekistan) 2–1 (Iran) Esteghlal
    - Al-Nassr (Saudi Arabia) 1–1 (Qatar) Al-Sadd
      - Standings (after 4 matches): Al-Sadd 8 points, Al-Nassr 5, Esteghlal, Pakhtakor 4.
  - Group D:
    - Emirates (United Arab Emirates) 2–1 (Saudi Arabia) Al-Shabab
    - Zob Ahan (Iran) 1–0 (Qatar) Al-Rayyan
      - Standings (after 4 matches): Zob Ahan 10 points, Emirates 6, Al-Shabab 5, Al-Rayyan 1.
  - Group F:
    - FC Seoul (South Korea) 0–2 (Japan) Nagoya Grampus
    - Al-Ain (United Arab Emirates) 1–0 (China) Hangzhou Greentown
      - Standings (after 4 matches): Nagoya Grampus, FC Seoul 7 points, Al-Ain, Hangzhou Greentown 4.
  - Group H:
    - Kashima Antlers (Japan) 1–1 (South Korea) Suwon Samsung Bluewings
    - Shanghai Shenhua (China) 2–3 (Australia) Sydney FC
      - Standings (after 4 matches): Suwon Samsung Bluewings, Kashima Antlers 6 points, Sydney FC 5, Shanghai Shenhua 2.

==== Ice hockey ====
- Women's World Championship in Switzerland: (team in **bold** advances to the semifinals, teams in italics advance to the quarterfinals)
  - Group B:
    - **Canada** 2–0 Finland
    - Switzerland 6–1 Kazakhstan
      - Final standings: Canada 9 points, Switzerland 5, Finland 4, Kazakhstan 0.
- World U18 Championships in Germany: (teams in **bold** advance to the semifinals, teams in italics advance to the quarterfinals)
  - Group A:
    - Russia 8–3 Switzerland
    - **United States** 7–3 Germany
      - Final standings: United States 12 points, Russia 8, Germany 4, Switzerland, Slovakia 3.
  - Group B:
    - Finland 5–3 Czech Republic
    - **Sweden** 4–2 Canada
      - Final standings: Sweden, Canada 9 points, Finland, Czech Republic 6, Norway 0.
- Stanley Cup playoffs (all series best-of-7; seeds in parentheses):
  - Western Conference Quarterfinals:
    - Game 4 in Chicago: (8) Chicago Blackhawks 7, (1) Vancouver Canucks 2. Canucks lead series 3–1.
    - Game 3 in Los Angeles: (2) San Jose Sharks 6, (7) Los Angeles Kings 5 (OT). Sharks lead series 2–1.

==== Snooker ====
- World Championship in Sheffield, England, last 32:
  - **Ronnie O'Sullivan** (ENG) 10–2 Dominic Dale (WAL)
  - Peter Ebdon (ENG) 8–10 **Stuart Bingham** (ENG)
  - Marco Fu (HKG) 6–3 Martin Gould (ENG)
  - Ricky Walden (ENG) 4–4 Rory McLeod (ENG)
  - Graeme Dott (SCO) 6–3 Mark King (ENG)
  - Mark Allen (NIR) 4–5 Matthew Stevens (WAL)

=== April 18, 2011 (Monday) ===
==== Athletics ====
- World Marathon Majors:
  - Boston Marathon:
    - Men: (gold) Geoffrey Mutai (KEN) 2:03:02 (course record) (silver) Moses Mosop (KEN) 2:03:06 (bronze) Gebregziabher Gebremariam (ETH) 2:04:53
      - Mutai runs almost a minute quicker than the world record set by Haile Gebrselassie (ETH) in Berlin in 2008, but course conditions make his time non-ratifiable.
      - WMM standings: (1) Emmanuel Kipchirchir Mutai (KEN) 55 points (2) Tsegaye Kebede (ETH) 41 (3) Geoffrey Mutai 40
    - Women: (gold) Caroline Kilel (KEN) 2:22.36 (silver) Desiree Davila (USA) 2:22:38 (bronze) Sharon Cherop (KEN) 2:22:43
      - WMM standings: (1) Liliya Shobukhova (RUS) 65 points (2) Mary Jepkosgei Keitany (KEN) & Edna Kiplagat (KEN) 35

==== Basketball ====
- NBA Playoffs (all series best-of-7; seeds in parentheses):
  - Eastern Conference First round:
    - Game 2 in Chicago: (1) Chicago Bulls 96, (8) Indiana Pacers 90. Bulls lead series 2–0.
    - Game 2 in Miami: (2) Miami Heat 94, (7) Philadelphia 76ers 73. Heat lead series 2–0.

==== Football (soccer) ====
- African Youth Championship in South Africa:
  - Group B:
    - Ghana 1–2 Nigeria
    - Cameroon 1–0 Gambia

==== Ice hockey ====
- Women's World Championship in Switzerland:
  - Group A:
    - Sweden 3–0 Slovakia
    - Russia 1–13 United States
      - Standings (after 2 games): United States, Sweden 6 points, Slovakia, Russia 0.
- World U18 Championships in Germany: (team in **bold** advances to the semifinals)
  - Group A: Germany 0–4 Slovakia
    - Standings: **United States** 9 points (3 games), Russia 5 (3), Germany 4 (3), Switzerland 3 (3), Slovakia 3 (4).
  - Group B: Canada 5–0 Norway
    - Standings: Canada 9 points (3 games), Czech Republic, Sweden 6 (3), Finland 3 (3), Norway 0 (4).
- Stanley Cup playoffs (all series best-of-7; seeds in parentheses):
  - Eastern Conference Quarterfinals:
    - Game 3 in Buffalo: (2) Philadelphia Flyers 4, (7) Buffalo Sabres 2. Flyers lead series 2–1.
    - Game 3 in Montreal: (3) Boston Bruins 4, (6) Montreal Canadiens 2. Canadiens lead series 2–1.
    - Game 3 in Tampa: (4) Pittsburgh Penguins 3, (5) Tampa Bay Lightning 2. Penguins lead series 2–1.
  - Western Conference Quarterfinals:
    - Game 3 in Glendale, Arizona: (3) Detroit Red Wings 4, (6) Phoenix Coyotes 2. Red Wings lead series 3–0.

==== Snooker ====
- World Championship in Sheffield, England, last 32:
  - **Ding Junhui** (CHN) 10–2 Jamie Burnett (SCO)
  - **Stephen Hendry** (SCO) 10–9 Joe Perry (ENG)
  - Stephen Maguire (SCO) 9–10 **Barry Hawkins** (ENG)
    - Hawkins reaches the last 16 of the event for the first time.
  - Ronnie O'Sullivan (ENG) 7–2 Dominic Dale (WAL)
    - O'Sullivan compiles his 100th century break at the Crucible.
  - Peter Ebdon (ENG) 4–5 Stuart Bingham (ENG)

=== April 17, 2011 (Sunday) ===
==== Athletics ====
- World Marathon Majors:
  - London Marathon:
    - Men: (gold) Emmanuel Kipchirchir Mutai (KEN) 2:04:38 (Course record) (silver) Martin Lel (KEN) 2:05:45 (bronze) Patrick Makau Musyoki (KEN) s.t.
      - WMM standings: (1) Mutai 55 points (2) Tsegaye Kebede (ETH) 41 (3) Makau 35
    - Women: (gold) Mary Jepkosgei Keitany (KEN) 2:19:17 (silver) Liliya Shobukhova (RUS) 2:20:15 (bronze) Edna Kiplagat (KEN) 2:20:46
      - WMM standings: (1) Shobukhova 65 points (2) Keitany & Kiplagat 35

==== Auto racing ====
- Formula One:
  - Chinese Grand Prix in Shanghai, China: (1) Lewis Hamilton (GBR) (McLaren–Mercedes) (2) Sebastian Vettel (GER) (Red Bull–Renault) (3) Mark Webber (AUS) (Red Bull-Renault)
    - Drivers' championship standings (after 3 of 19 races): (1) Vettel 68 points (2) Hamilton 47 (3) Jenson Button (GBR) (McLaren-Mercedes) 38
- Sprint Cup Series:
  - Aaron's 499 in Talladega, Alabama: (1) (California) Jimmie Johnson (Chevrolet; Hendrick Motorsports) (2) (Kansas) Clint Bowyer (Chevrolet; Richard Childress Racing) (3) (California) Jeff Gordon (Chevrolet; Hendrick Motorsports)
    - Johnson wins the race by 0.002 seconds, tying the closest finish in NASCAR history.
    - Drivers' championship standings (after 8 of 36 races): (1) (Missouri) Carl Edwards (Ford; Roush Fenway Racing) 295 points (2) Johnson 290 (3) (North Carolina) Dale Earnhardt Jr. (Chevrolet; Hendrick Motorsports) 276
- IndyCar Series:
  - Toyota Grand Prix of Long Beach in Long Beach, California: (1) Mike Conway (GBR) (Andretti Autosport) (2) Ryan Briscoe (AUS) (Team Penske) (3) Dario Franchitti (GBR) (Chip Ganassi Racing)
    - Drivers' championship standings (after 3 of 17 races): (1) Franchitti 122 points (2) Will Power (AUS) (Team Penske) 115 (3) Tony Kanaan (BRA) (KV Racing Technology – Lotus) 87
- V8 Supercars:
  - ITM Hamilton 400 in Hamilton, New Zealand:
    - Race 6: (1) Shane van Gisbergen (NZL) (Stone Brothers Racing, Ford FG Falcon) (2) Lee Holdsworth (AUS) (Garry Rogers Motorsport, Holden VE Commodore) (3) Garth Tander (AUS) (Holden Racing Team, Holden VE Commodore)
      - Drivers' championship standings (after 6 of 27 races): (1) Jamie Whincup (AUS) (Triple Eight Race Engineering, Holden VE Commodore) 654 points (2) Rick Kelly (AUS) (Kelly Racing, Holden VE Commodore) 573 (3) Craig Lowndes (AUS) (Triple Eight Race Engineering, Holden VE Commodore) 552

==== Basketball ====
- EuroCup Final Four in Treviso, Italy:
  - Third place game: (bronze) **Cedevita Zagreb** (Croatia) 59–57 (Italy) Benetton Basket Bwin
  - Final: (gold) **UNICS Kazan** (Russia) 92–77 (silver) (Spain) Cajasol
    - UNICS win the title for the first time, becoming the second Russian team to win the tournament.
- NBA Playoffs (all series best-of-7; seeds in parentheses):
  - Eastern Conference First round:
    - Game 1 in Boston: (3) Boston Celtics 87, (6) New York Knicks 85. Celtics lead series 1–0.
  - Western Conference First round:
    - Game 1 in San Antonio: (8) Memphis Grizzlies 101, (1) San Antonio Spurs 98. Grizzlies lead series 1–0.
      - The Grizzlies win a playoff game for the first time in the 16-year history of the franchise, having been swept 4–0 in their three previous appearances.
    - Game 1 in Los Angeles: (7) New Orleans Hornets 109, (2) Los Angeles Lakers 100. Hornets lead series 1–0.
    - Game 1 in Oklahoma City: (4) Oklahoma City Thunder 107, (5) Denver Nuggets 103. Thunder lead series 1–0.

==== Cycling ====
- UCI World Tour:
  - Amstel Gold Race: (gold) Philippe Gilbert (BEL) (Omega Pharma–Lotto) 6h 30' 44" (silver) Joaquim Rodríguez (ESP) (Team Katusha) + 2" (bronze) Simon Gerrans (AUS) (Team Sky) + 4"
    - World Tour standings (after 10 of 27 races): (1) Fabian Cancellara (SUI) (Leopard Trek) 236 points (2) Matthew Goss (AUS) (HTC–Highroad) 203 (3) Andreas Klöden (GER) (Team RadioShack) & Michele Scarponi (ITA) (Lampre–ISD) 202

==== Football (soccer) ====
- African Youth Championship in South Africa:
  - Group A:
    - South Africa 2–4 Mali
    - Egypt 2–0 Lesotho
- OFC Champions League Final, second leg (first leg score in parentheses):
  - **Auckland City** (New Zealand) 4–0 (2–1) (Vanuatu) Amicale. Auckland City win 6–1 on aggregate.
    - Auckland City win the title for the third time.
- UEFA Women's Champions League semi-finals, second leg (first leg score in parentheses):
  - **Turbine Potsdam** (Germany) 1–0 (2–2) (Germany) Duisburg. Turbine Potsdam win 3–2 on aggregate.
- (Malta) Premier League, matchday 25 (team in **bold** qualifies for the UEFA Champions League):
  - **Valletta** 1–0 Marsaxlokk
    - Standings: Valletta 39 points, Floriana 27, Birkirkara 25.
    - Valletta win the title for the 20th time.

==== Golf ====
- PGA Tour:
  - Valero Texas Open in San Antonio:
    - Winner: Brendan Steele (USA) 280 (−8)
      - Steele wins his first PGA Tour title.
- European Tour:
  - Maybank Malaysian Open in Kuala Lumpur, Malaysia:
    - Winner: Matteo Manassero (ITA) 272 (−16)
      - Manassero wins his second career European Tour title, two days before his 18th birthday.
- Champions Tour:
  - Outback Steakhouse Pro-Am in Lutz, Florida:
    - Winner: John Cook (USA) 204 (−9)^{PO}
      - Cook defeats Jay Don Blake (USA) on the first playoff hole and wins his second Champions Tour title of the season and seventh overall.

==== Ice hockey ====
- Women's World Championship in Switzerland:
  - Group A:
    - United States 5–0 Slovakia
    - Sweden 7–1 Russia
  - Group B:
    - Kazakhstan 0–7 Canada
    - Finland 1–2 (OT) Switzerland
      - Standings (after 2 games): Canada 6 points, Finland 4, Switzerland 2, Kazakhstan 0.
- World U18 Championships in Germany:
  - Group A:
    - Slovakia 2–3 Switzerland
    - United States 4–3 Russia
      - Standings: United States 9 points (3 games), Russia 5 (3), Germany 4 (2), Switzerland 3 (3), Slovakia 0 (3).
  - Group B:
    - Norway 2–3 Czech Republic
    - Sweden 5–2 Finland
      - Standings: Canada 6 points (2 games), Czech Republic, Sweden 6 (3), Finland 3 (3), Norway 0 (3).
- Stanley Cup playoffs (all series best-of-7; seeds in parentheses):
  - Eastern Conference Quarterfinals:
    - Game 3 in New York: (8) New York Rangers 3, (1) Washington Capitals 2. Capitals lead series 2–1.
  - Western Conference Quarterfinals:
    - Game 3 in Nashville: (4) (5) Nashville Predators 4, Anaheim Ducks 3. Predators lead series 2–1.
    - Game 3 in Chicago: (1) Vancouver Canucks 3, (8) Chicago Blackhawks 2. Canucks lead series 3–0.

==== Motorcycle racing ====
- Superbike:
  - Assen World Championship round in Assen, Netherlands:
    - Race 1: (1) Jonathan Rea (GBR) (Honda CBR1000RR) (2) Max Biaggi (ITA) (Aprilia RSV4) (3) Carlos Checa (ESP) (Ducati 1198)
    - Race 2: (1) Checa (2) Biaggi (3) Rea
      - Riders' championship standings (after 3 of 13 rounds): (1) Checa 132 points (2) Biaggi 89 (3) Marco Melandri (ITA) (Yamaha YZF-R1) 85
- Supersport:
  - Assen World Championship round in Assen, Netherlands: (1) Chaz Davies (GBR) (Yamaha YZF-R6) (2) Fabien Foret (FRA) (Honda CBR600RR) (3) Broc Parkes (AUS) (Kawasaki Ninja ZX-6R)
    - Riders' championship standings (after 3 of 12 rounds): (1) Luca Scassa (ITA) (Yamaha YZF-R6) 50 points (2) Parkes 47 (3) Davies 45

==== Snooker ====
- World Championship in Sheffield, England, last 32:
  - **Jamie Cope** (ENG) 10–7 Andrew Pagett (WAL)
  - **Shaun Murphy** (ENG) 10–1 Marcus Campbell (SCO)
  - **Ali Carter** (ENG) 10–3 Dave Harold (ENG)
  - **Mark Williams** (WAL) 10–5 Ryan Day (WAL)
  - Ding Junhui (CHN) 8–1 Jamie Burnett (SCO)
  - Stephen Hendry (SCO) 6–3 Joe Perry (ENG)

==== Tennis ====
- Fed Cup World Group Semifinals, day 2:
  - **Russia** 5–0 Italy
    - Vera Zvonareva (RUS) def. Roberta Vinci (ITA) 6–4, 6–2
    - Anastasia Pavlyuchenkova (RUS) def. Sara Errani (ITA) 7–6(5), 7–6(4)
    - Pavlyuchenkova/Ekaterina Makarova (RUS) def. Alberta Brianti/Maria Elena Camerin (ITA) 7–6(3), 6–1
  - Belgium 2–3 **Czech Republic**
    - Petra Kvitová (CZE) def. Yanina Wickmayer (BEL) 5–7, 6–4, 6–2
    - Kirsten Flipkens (BEL) def. Barbora Záhlavová-Strýcová (CZE) 6–2, 6–3
    - Iveta Benešová/Záhlavová-Strýcová (CZE) def. Flipkens/Wickmayer (BEL) 6–4, 6–4
- ATP World Tour:
  - Monte-Carlo Rolex Masters in Roquebrune-Cap-Martin, France:
    - Final: **Rafael Nadal** (ESP) def. David Ferrer (ESP) 6–4, 7–5
      - Nadal wins the event for the seventh successive year, and his 19th Masters 1000 title and 44th title overall.

==== Weightlifting ====
- European Championships in Kazan, Russia:
  - Women +75 kg:
    - Snatch: (gold) Tatiana Kashirina (RUS) 146 kg (WR) (silver) Hripsime Khurshudyan (ARM) 114 kg (bronze) Ümmühan Uçar (TUR) 113 kg
    - Clean & Jerk: (gold) Kashirina 181 kg (silver) Khurshudyan 140 kg (bronze) Uçar 136 kg
    - Total: (gold) Kashirina 327 kg (WR) (silver) Khurshudyan 254 kg (bronze) Uçar 249 kg
      - Kashirina wins the title for the third successive time.
  - Men +105 kg:
    - Snatch: (gold) Ihor Shimechko (UKR) 195 kg (silver) Dmitry Lapikov (RUS) 192 kg (bronze) Irakli Turmanidze (GEO) 188 kg
    - Clean & Jerk: (gold) Lapikov 227 kg (silver) Jiří Orság (CZE) 226 kg (bronze) Bünyamin Sudaş (TUR) 224 kg
    - Total: (gold) Lapikov 419 kg (silver) Shimechko 412 kg (bronze) Orság 410 kg

=== April 16, 2011 (Saturday) ===
==== Auto racing ====
- World Rally Championship:
  - Jordan Rally in Amman, Jordan: (1) Sébastien Ogier (FRA)/Julien Ingrassia (FRA) (Citroën DS3 WRC) (2) Jari-Matti Latvala (FIN)/Miikka Anttila (FIN) (Ford Fiesta RS WRC) (3) Sébastien Loeb (FRA)/Daniel Elena (MON) (Citroën DS3 WRC)
    - Ogier wins the event by 0.2 seconds, the smallest margin in WRC history.
    - Drivers' championship standings (after 4 of 13 rallies): (1) Loeb 74 points (2) Mikko Hirvonen (FIN) (Ford Fiesta RS WRC) 72 (3) Ogier 69
- V8 Supercars:
  - ITM Hamilton 400 in Hamilton, New Zealand:
    - Race 5: (1) Rick Kelly (AUS) (Kelly Racing, Holden VE Commodore) (2) Craig Lowndes (AUS) (Triple Eight Race Engineering, Holden VE Commodore) (3) Todd Kelly (AUS) (Kelly Racing, Holden VE Commodore)
      - Drivers' championship standings (after 5 of 27 races): (1) Jamie Whincup (AUS) (Triple Eight Race Engineering, Holden VE Commodore) 603 points (2) Mark Winterbottom (AUS) (Ford Performance Racing, Ford FG Falcon) 543 (3) Lowndes 474
- Nationwide Series:
  - Aaron's 312 in Talladega, Alabama: (1) (Nevada) Kyle Busch (Toyota; Joe Gibbs Racing) (2) (Connecticut) Joey Logano (Toyota; Joe Gibbs Racing) (3) (Florida) Joe Nemechek (Chevrolet; NEMCO Motorsports)
    - Drivers' championship standings (after 7 of 34 races): (1) (California) Jason Leffler (Chevrolet; Turner Motorsports) 233 points (2) (Illinois) Justin Allgaier (Chevrolet; Turner Motorsports) 231 (3) (Virginia) Elliott Sadler (Chevrolet; Kevin Harvick Incorporated) 228

==== Basketball ====
- EuroCup Final Four in Treviso, Italy:
  - Semifinals:
    - **UNICS Kazan** (Russia) 87–66 (Croatia) Cedevita Zagreb
    - **Cajasol** (Spain) 75–63 (Italy) Benetton Basket Bwin
- NBA Playoffs (all series best-of-7; seeds in parentheses):
  - Eastern Conference First round:
    - Game 1 in Chicago: (1) Chicago Bulls 104, (8) Indiana Pacers 99. Bulls lead series 1–0.
    - Game 1 in Miami: (2) Miami Heat 97, (7) Philadelphia 76ers 89. Heat lead series 1–0.
    - Game 1 in Orlando: (5) Atlanta Hawks 103, (4) Orlando Magic 93. Hawks lead series 1–0.
  - Western Conference First round:
    - Game 1 in Dallas: (3) Dallas Mavericks 89, (6) Portland Trail Blazers 81. Mavericks lead series 1–0.

==== Football (soccer) ====
- UEFA Women's Champions League semi-finals, second leg: (first leg score in parentheses)
  - Arsenal (England) 2–3 (0–2) (France) **Lyon**. Lyon win 5–2 on aggregate.

==== Ice hockey ====
- Women's World Championship in Switzerland:
  - Group B:
    - Finland 5–3 Kazakhstan
    - Canada 12–0 Switzerland
- World U18 Championships in Germany:
  - Group A: Germany 4–5 (SO) Russia
    - Standings (after 2 games): United States 6 points, Russia 5, Germany 4, Switzerland, Slovakia 0.
  - Group B: Canada 5–4 Finland
    - Standings (after 2 games): Canada 6 points, Sweden, Finland, Czech Republic 3, Norway 0.
- Stanley Cup playoffs (all series best-of-7; seeds in parentheses):
  - Eastern Conference Quarterfinals:
    - Game 2 in Philadelphia: (2) Philadelphia Flyers 5, (7) Buffalo Sabres 4. Series tied 1–1.
    - Game 2 in Boston: (6) Montreal Canadiens 3, (3) Boston Bruins 1. Canadiens lead series 2–0.
  - Western Conference Quarterfinals:
    - Game 2 in San Jose: (7) Los Angeles Kings 4, (2) San Jose Sharks 0. Series tied 1–1.
    - Game 2 in Detroit: (3) Detroit Red Wings 4, (6) Phoenix Coyotes 3. Red Wings lead series 2–0.
- Gagarin Cup Finals (best-of-7 series):
  - Game 5 in Ufa: (3) Salavat Yulaev Ufa 3, (4) Atlant Moscow Oblast 2. **Salavat Yulaev win series 4–1.**
    - Salavat Yulaev win the Cup for the first time.

==== Snooker ====
- World Championship in Sheffield, England, last 32:
  - Neil Robertson (AUS) 8–10 **Judd Trump** (ENG)
    - Robertson falls to the Crucible curse, as he becomes another first-time champion to not defend his title.
  - Jamie Cope (ENG) 5–4 Andrew Pagett (WAL)
  - Ali Carter (ENG) 8–1 Dave Harold (ENG)
  - Mark Williams (WAL) 6–3 Ryan Day (WAL)
  - Shaun Murphy (ENG) 9–0 Marcus Campbell (SCO)

==== Tennis ====
- Fed Cup World Group Semifinals, day 1:
  - Russia 2–0 Italy
    - Vera Zvonareva (RUS) def. Sara Errani (ITA) 6–0, 6–2
    - Svetlana Kuznetsova (RUS) def. Roberta Vinci (ITA) 6–2, 6–7(4), 6–1
  - Belgium 1–1 Czech Republic
    - Petra Kvitová (CZE) def. Kirsten Flipkens (BEL) 6–2, 7–6(4)
    - Yanina Wickmayer (BEL) def. Barbora Záhlavová-Strýcová (CZE) 6–4, 6–4

==== Weightlifting ====
- European Championships in Kazan, Russia:
  - Men 94 kg:
    - Snatch: (gold) Aurimas Didzbalis (LTU) 177 kg (silver) Anatoli Ciricu (MDA) 173 kg (bronze) Gevorik Pogosyan (ARM) 173 kg
    - Clean & Jerk: (gold) Andrey Demanov (RUS) 220 kg (silver) Ciricu 217 kg (bronze) Pogosyan 216 kg
    - Total: (gold) Demanov 391 kg (silver) Ciricu 390 kg (bronze) Pogosyan 389 kg
  - Women 75 kg:
    - Snatch: (gold) Natalya Zabolotnaya (RUS) 133 kg (silver) Nadezhda Yevstyukhina (RUS) 130 kg (bronze) Lydia Valentín (ESP) 122 kg
    - Clean & Jerk: (gold) Yevstyukhina 162 kg (silver) Zabolotnaya 153 kg (bronze) Valentín 142 kg
    - Total: (gold) Yevstyukhina 292 kg (silver) Zabolotnaya 286 kg (bronze) Valentín 264 kg
  - Men 105 kg:
    - Snatch: (gold) Akkaev Khadzhimurat (RUS) 195 kg (silver) Machavariani Gia (GEO) 183 kg (bronze) Audzeyeu Mikhail (BLR) 181 kg
    - Clean & Jerk: (gold) Khadzhimurat 230 kg (silver) Gia 217 kg (bronze) Bonk Bartlomiej (POL) 214 kg
    - Total: (gold) Khadzhimurat 425 kg (silver) Gia 400 kg (bronze) Bartlomiej 394 kg

=== April 15, 2011 (Friday) ===
==== Football (soccer) ====
- AFC Cup group stage, matchday 4:
  - Group B: Al-Saqr (Yemen) 2–2 (Kuwait) Al-Qadsia
    - Standings: Al-Qadsia 10 points (4 matches), (Uzbekistan) Shurtan Guzar, (Syria) Al-Ittihad 4 (3), Al-Saqr 1 (4).

==== Ice hockey ====
- World U18 Championships in Germany:
  - Group A:
    - Slovakia 1–8 United States
    - Switzerland 1–4 Germany
      - Standings: United States 6 points (2 games), Russia, Germany 3 (1), Switzerland, Slovakia 0 (2).
  - Group B:
    - Norway 2–10 Sweden
    - Czech Republic 0–5 Canada
      - Standings: Sweden 3 points (2 games), Canada, Finland 3 (1), Czech Republic 3 (2), Norway 0 (2).
- Stanley Cup playoffs (all series best-of-7; seeds in parentheses):
  - Eastern Conference Quarterfinals:
    - Game 2 in Washington: (1) Washington Capitals 2, (8) New York Rangers 0. Capitals lead series 2–0.
    - Game 2 in Pittsburgh: (5) Tampa Bay Lightning 5, (4) Pittsburgh Penguins 1. Series tied 1–1.
  - Western Conference Quarterfinals:
    - Game 2 in Vancouver: (1) Vancouver Canucks 4, (8) Chicago Blackhawks 3. Canucks lead series 2–0.
    - Game 2 in Anaheim: (4) Anaheim Ducks 5, (5) Nashville Predators 3. Series tied 1–1.

==== Weightlifting ====
- European Championships in Kazan, Russia:
  - Women 69 kg:
    - Snatch: (gold) Oxana Slivenko (RUS) 120 kg (silver) Tatiana Matveeva (RUS) 110 kg (bronze) Eszter Krutzler (HUN) 104 kg
    - Clean & Jerk: (gold) Slivenko 145 kg (silver) Matveeva 141 kg (bronze) Krutzler 127 kg
    - Total: (gold) Slivenko 265 kg (silver) Matveeva 251 kg (bronze) Krutzler 231 kg
      - Slivenko wins her second European title.
  - Men 85 kg:
    - Snatch: (gold) Apti Aukhadov (RUS) 173 kg (silver) Aleksey Yufkin (RUS) 170 kg (bronze) Anatoly Moshik (ISR) 165 kg
    - Clean & Jerk: (gold) Yufkin 215 kg (silver) Aukhadov 212 kg (bronze) Benjamin Hennequin (FRA) 208 kg
    - Total: (gold) Yufkin 385 kg (silver) Aukhadov 385 kg (bronze) Hennequin 373 kg
      - Yufkin wins his second European title.

=== April 14, 2011 (Thursday) ===
==== Darts ====
- Premier League, week 10 in Sheffield, England (player in **bold** qualifies for the playoffs):
  - James Wade (ENG) 8–5 Simon Whitlock (AUS)
  - Mark Webster (WAL) 1–8 Gary Anderson (SCO)
  - Terry Jenkins (ENG) 2–8 **Phil Taylor** (ENG)
  - Raymond van Barneveld (NED) 8–3 Adrian Lewis (ENG)
    - Standings (after 10 matches): Taylor 18 points, Anderson 14, van Barneveld 12, Whitlock 10, Lewis 9, Wade 8, Jenkins 5, Webster 4.

==== Football (soccer) ====
- UEFA Europa League quarter-finals, second leg: (first leg score in parentheses)
  - Spartak Moscow (Russia) 2–5 (1–5) (Portugal) **Porto**. Porto win 10–3 on aggregate.
  - PSV Eindhoven (Netherlands) 2–2 (1–4) (Portugal) **Benfica**. Benfica win 6–3 on aggregate.
  - Twente (Netherlands) 1–3 (1–5) (Spain) **Villarreal**. Villarreal win 8–2 on aggregate.
  - **Braga** (Portugal) 0–0 (1–1) (Ukraine) Dynamo Kyiv. 1–1 on aggregate; Braga win on away goals.
- Copa Libertadores second stage (teams in **bold** advance to the knockout stage):
  - Group 2:
    - Oriente Petrolero (Bolivia) 3–0 (Brazil) **Grêmio**
    - **Junior** (Colombia) 1–1 (Peru) León de Huánuco
      - Final standings: Junior 13 points, Grêmio 10, Oriente Petrolero 6, León de Huánuco 5.
  - Group 4:
    - **Universidad Católica** (Chile) 2–1 (Chile) Unión Española
    - Caracas (Venezuela) 0–3 (Argentina) **Vélez Sarsfield**
      - Final standings: Universidad Católica 11 points, Vélez Sársfield 10, Caracas 9, Unión Española 4.
  - Group 5: Cerro Porteño (Paraguay) 1–2 (Brazil) Santos
    - Standings (after 5 matches): (Chile) Colo-Colo 9 points, Cerro Porteño, Santos 8, (Venezuela) Deportivo Táchira 2.

==== Ice hockey ====
- World U18 Championships in Germany:
  - Group A:
    - Russia 8–2 Slovakia
    - Switzerland 1–2 United States
  - Group B:
    - Finland 5–2 Norway
    - Czech Republic 2–1 Sweden
- Stanley Cup playoffs (all series best-of-7; seeds in parentheses):
  - Eastern Conference Quarterfinals:
    - Game 1 in Philadelphia: (7) Buffalo Sabres 1, (2) Philadelphia Flyers 0. Sabres lead series 1–0.
    - Game 1 in Boston: (6) Montreal Canadiens 2, (3) Boston Bruins 0. Canadiens lead series 1–0.
  - Western Conference Quarterfinals:
    - Game 1 in San Jose: (2) San Jose Sharks 3, (7) Los Angeles Kings 2 (OT). Sharks lead series 1–0.

==== Snooker ====
- Scottish Professional Championship at Clydebank, Scotland:
  - Final: **John Higgins** (SCO) 6–1 Anthony McGill (ENG)
    - Higgins wins the 37th title of his career and fifth of the season.

==== Weightlifting ====
- European Championships in Kazan, Russia:
  - Women 63 kg:
    - Snatch: (gold) Svetlana Tsarukaeva (RUS) 112 kg (silver) Sibel Şimşek (TUR) 108 kg (bronze) Marina Shainova (RUS) 104 kg
    - Clean & Jerk: (gold) Shainova 141 kg (silver) Tsarukaeva 133 kg (bronze) Şimşek 130 kg
    - Total: (gold) Shainova 245 kg (silver) Tsarukaeva 245 kg (bronze) Şimşek 238 kg
      - Shainova wins the title for the fourth time.
  - Men 77 kg:
    - Snatch: (gold) Arayik Mirzoyan (ARM) 160 kg (silver) Erkand Qerimaj (ALB) 157 kg (bronze) Semih Yağci (TUR) 155 kg
    - Clean & Jerk: (gold) Yagci 192 kg (silver) Mirzoyan 187 kg (bronze) Alexandru Rosu (ROU) 185 kg
    - Total: (gold) Yagci 347 kg (silver) Mirzoyan 347 kg (bronze) Rosu 340 kg

=== April 13, 2011 (Wednesday) ===
==== Baseball ====
- Barry Bonds, the all-time career home run leader in Major League Baseball, is convicted in U.S. federal court of obstruction of justice related to his actions during the investigation of the BALCO steroids case. The jury fails to reach a verdict on three perjury counts.

==== Cricket ====
- Australia in Bangladesh:
  - 3rd ODI in Mirpur: Australia 361/8 (50 overs; Michael Hussey 108); Bangladesh 295/6 (50 overs). **Australia win by 66 runs; win 3-match series 3–0.**

==== Football (soccer) ====
- UEFA Champions League quarter-finals, second leg (first leg score in parentheses):
  - **Schalke 04** (Germany) 2–1 (5–2) (Italy) Internazionale. Schalke 04 win 7–3 on aggregate.
  - Tottenham Hotspur (England) 0–1 (0–4) (Spain) **Real Madrid**. Real Madrid win 5–0 on aggregate.
- Copa Libertadores second stage (teams in **bold** advance to the knockout stage):
  - Group 7:
    - Guaraní (Paraguay) 0–2 (Colombia) Deportes Tolima
    - **Estudiantes** (Argentina) 0–3 (Brazil) **Cruzeiro**
      - Final standings: Cruzeiro 16 points, Estudiantes 10, Deportes Tolima 8, Guaraní 0.
- AFC Champions League group stage:
  - Group H: Sydney FC (Australia) 0–3 (Japan) Kashima Antlers
    - Standings (after 3 matches): (South Korea) Suwon Samsung Bluewings, Kashima Antlers 5 points, Sydney FC, (China) Shanghai Shenhua 2.
- AFC Cup group stage, matchday 3:
  - Group B: Shurtan Guzar (Uzbekistan) 1–1 (Syria) Al-Ittihad
    - Standings (after 3 matches): (Kuwait) Al-Qadsia 9 points, Shurtan Guzar, Al-Ittihad 4, (Yemen) Al-Saqr 0.
  - Group D:
    - Al-Suwaiq (Oman) 1–2 (Iraq) Al-Talaba
    - Al-Kuwait 1–3 (Jordan) Al-Wehdat
      - Standings (after 3 matches): Al-Wehdat 9 points, Al-Kuwait 6, Al-Talaba 3, Al-Suwaiq 0.
  - Group F:
    - Sriwijaya (Indonesia) 3–1 (Vietnam) Sông Lam Nghệ An
    - VB (Maldives) 3–5 (Hong Kong) TSW Pegasus
      - Standings (after 3 matches): Sriwijaya 7 points, TSW Pegasus 6, Sông Lam Nghệ An 3, VB 1.
  - Group H:
    - Persipura Jayapura (Indonesia) 3–0 (Thailand) Chonburi
    - South China (Hong Kong) 1–0 (India) Kingfisher East Bengal
      - Standings (after 3 matches): Persipura Jayapura 7 points, Chonburi, South China 4, Kingfisher East Bengal 1.

==== Ice hockey ====
- Stanley Cup playoffs (all series best-of-7; seeds in parentheses):
  - Eastern Conference quarterfinals:
    - Game 1 in Pittsburgh: (4) Pittsburgh Penguins 3, (5) Tampa Bay Lightning 0. Penguins lead series 1–0.
    - Game 1 in Washington: (1) Washington Capitals 2, (8) New York Rangers 1 (OT). Capitals lead series 1–0.
  - Western Conference quarterfinals:
    - Game 1 in Detroit: (3) Detroit Red Wings 4, (6) Phoenix Coyotes 2. Red Wings lead series 1–0.
    - Game 1 in Vancouver: (1) Vancouver Canucks 2, (8) Chicago Blackhawks 0. Canucks lead series 1–0.
    - Game 1 in Anaheim: (5) Nashville Predators 4, (4) Anaheim Ducks 1. Predators lead series 1–0.

==== Weightlifting ====
- European Championships in Kazan, Russia:
  - Women 58 kg:
    - Snatch: (gold) Nastassia Novikava (BLR) 100 kg (silver) Iuliia Paratova (UKR) 92 kg (bronze) Yuliya Derkach (UKR) 88 kg
    - Clean & Jerk: (gold) Novikava 125 kg (silver) Alexandra Klejnowska (POL) 110 kg (bronze) Paratova 108 kg
    - Total: (gold) Novikava 225 kg (silver) Paratova 200 kg (bronze) Klejnowska 196 kg
      - Novikava wins her third successive title and fourth overall.
  - Men 69 kg:
    - Snatch: (gold) Mete Binay (TUR) 154 kg (silver) Răzvan Constantin Martin (ROU) 150 kg (bronze) Vladislav Lukanin (RUS) 146 kg
    - Clean & Jerk: (gold) Lukanin 186 kg (silver) Martin 181 kg (bronze) Daniel Godelli (ALB) 176 kg
    - Total: (gold) Lukanin 332 kg (silver) Martin 331 kg (bronze) Godelli 321 kg

=== April 12, 2011 (Tuesday) ===
==== Baseball ====
- Nippon Professional Baseball season opening games:
  - Pacific League:
    - Fukuoka SoftBank Hawks 2, Orix Buffaloes 2 (12 innings)
    - Saitama Seibu Lions 12, Hokkaido Nippon-Ham Fighters 3
    - Tohoku Rakuten Golden Eagles 6, Chiba Lotte Marines 4
  - Central League:
    - Yokohama BayStars 5, Chunichi Dragons 4
    - Hanshin Tigers 7, Hiroshima Toyo Carp 4
    - Yomiuri Giants 9, Tokyo Yakult Swallows 2

==== Football (soccer) ====
- UEFA Champions League quarter-finals, second leg: (first leg score in parentheses)
  - Shakhtar Donetsk (Ukraine) 0–1 (1–5) (Spain) **Barcelona**. Barcelona win 6–1 on aggregate.
  - **Manchester United** (England) 2–1 (1–0) (England) Chelsea. Manchester United win 3–1 on aggregate.
- Copa Libertadores second stage (teams in **bold** advance to the knockout stage):
  - Group 5: Colo-Colo (Chile) 2–1 (Venezuela) Deportivo Táchira
    - Standings: Colo-Colo 9 points (5 matches), (Paraguay) Cerro Porteño 8 (4), (Brazil) Santos 5 (4), Deportivo Táchira 2 (5).
  - Group 8:
    - **Peñarol** (Uruguay) 0–1 (Argentina) Independiente
    - **LDU Quito** (Ecuador) 2–0 (Argentina) Godoy Cruz
      - Final standings: LDU Quito 10 points, Peñarol 9, Independiente 8, Godoy Cruz 7.
- AFC Champions League group stage:
  - Group F: Nagoya Grampus (Japan) 4–0 (United Arab Emirates) Al-Ain
    - Standings (after 3 matches): (South Korea) FC Seoul 7 points, Nagoya Grampus, (China) Hangzhou Greentown 4, Al-Ain 1.
- AFC Cup group stage, matchday 3:
  - Group A:
    - Al-Tilal (Yemen) 1–4 (Lebanon) Al-Ansar
    - Dempo (India) 0–4 (Uzbekistan) Nasaf Qarshi
      - Standings (after 3 matches): Nasaf Qarshi 9 points, Al-Ansar 6, Dempo 3, Al-Tilal 0.
  - Group B: Al-Qadsia (Kuwait) 3–0 (Yemen) Al-Saqr
    - Standings: Al-Qadsia 9 points (3 matches), (Uzbekistan) Shurtan Guzar, (Syria) Al-Ittihad 3 (2), Al-Saqr 0 (3).
  - Group C:
    - Al-Faisaly (Jordan) 2–1 (Kuwait) Al-Nasr
    - Al-Jaish (Syria) 0–0 (Iraq) Duhok
      - Standings (after 3 matches): Duhok 7 points, Al-Faisaly 6, Al-Jaish 4, Al-Nasr 0.
  - Group E:
    - Al Ahed (Lebanon) 4–1 (Syria) Al-Karamah
    - Arbil (Iraq) 0–0 (Oman) Al-Oruba
      - Standings (after 3 matches): Al-Oruba, Arbil 5 points, Al Ahed 3, Al-Karamah 2.
  - Group G:
    - Hà Nội T&T (Vietnam) 1–1 (Singapore) Tampines Rovers
    - Muangthong United (Thailand) 1–0 (Maldives) Victory
      - Standings (after 3 matches): Muangthong United 7 points, Tampines Rovers 5, Hà Nội T&T 4, Victory 0.

==== Golf ====
- The South Africa-based Sunshine Tour announces that starting in 2012, it will host a new World Golf Championships tournament. The event, to be known as the Tournament of Hope, is planned to launch with a purse of US$10 million, the richest in golf.

==== Weightlifting ====
- European Championships in Kazan, Russia:
  - Women 53 kg:
    - Snatch: (gold) Aylin Daşdelen (TUR) 90 kg (silver) Elen Grygorian (ARM) 85 kg (bronze) Julia Rohde (GER) 83 kg
    - Clean & Jerk: (gold) Daşdelen 112 kg (silver) Grygorian 110 kg (bronze) Ayşegül Çoban (TUR) 105 kg
    - Total: (gold) Daşdelen 202 kg (silver) Grygorian 195 kg (bronze) Rohde 187 kg
      - Daşdelen wins her second successive title and fourth overall.
  - Men 62 kg:
    - Snatch: (gold) Bünyamin Sezer (TUR) 140 kg (silver) Antoniu Buci (ROU) 134 kg (bronze) Damian Wiśniewski (POL) 130 kg
    - Clean & Jerk: (gold) Marius Gîscan (ROU) 162 kg (silver) Hurşit Atak (TUR) 161 kg (bronze) Sezer 158 kg
    - Total: (gold) Sezer 298 kg (silver) Buci 290 kg (bronze) Atak 289 kg

=== April 11, 2011 (Monday) ===
==== Cricket ====
- Australia in Bangladesh:
  - 2nd ODI in Mirpur: Bangladesh 229/7 (50 overs); Australia 232/1 (26 overs; Shane Watson 185*). **Australia win by 9 wickets; lead 3-match series 2–0.**
    - Watson records the highest One Day International score by an Australian, and also sets a new record for most sixes in an ODI innings with 15.

==== Weightlifting ====
- European Championships in Kazan, Russia:
  - Women 48 kg:
    - Snatch: (gold) Nurcan Taylan (TUR) 90 kg (silver) Genny Pagliaro (ITA) 82 kg (bronze) Nurdan Karagöz (TUR) 80 kg
    - Clean & Jerk: (gold) Taylan 105 kg (silver) Karagöz 100 kg (bronze) Pagliaro 98 kg
    - Total: (gold) Taylan 195 kg (silver) Karagöz 180 kg (bronze) Pagliaro 180 kg
      - Taylan wins her fourth successive European title and sixth overall.
  - Men 56 kg:
    - Snatch: (gold) Gökhan Kılıç (TUR) 118 kg (silver) Stanislau Chadovich (BLR) 118 kg (bronze) Ghenadie Dudoglo (MDA) 115 kg
    - Clean & Jerk: (gold) Oleg Sîrghi (MDA) 150 kg (silver) Florin Ionuț Croitoru (ROU) 141 kg (bronze) Smbat Margaryan (ARM) 141 kg
    - Total: (gold) Sîrghi 262 kg (silver) Kılıç 256 kg (bronze) Croitoru 256 kg

=== April 10, 2011 (Sunday) ===
==== Auto racing ====
- Formula One:
  - Malaysian Grand Prix in Sepang, Malaysia: (1) Sebastian Vettel (GER) (Red Bull–Renault) (2) Jenson Button (GBR) (McLaren–Mercedes) (3) Nick Heidfeld (GER) (Renault)
    - Drivers' championship standings (after 2 of 19 races): (1) Vettel 50 points (2) Button 26 (3) Lewis Hamilton (GBR) (McLaren-Mercedes) & Mark Webber (AUS) (Red Bull-Renault) 22
- IndyCar Series:
  - Honda Indy Grand Prix of Alabama presented by Legacy Credit Union in Birmingham, Alabama: (1) Will Power (AUS) (Team Penske) (2) Scott Dixon (NZL) (Chip Ganassi Racing) (3) Dario Franchitti (GBR) (Chip Ganassi Racing)
    - Drivers' championship standings (after 2 of 17 races): (1) Power 94 points (2) Franchitti 87 (3) Tony Kanaan (BRA) (KV Racing Technology – Lotus) 63

==== Basketball ====
- EuroLeague Women Final Four in Yekaterinburg, Russia:
  - Third place game: Ros Casares Valencia (Spain) 52–64 (bronze) (Russia) **UMMC Ekaterinburg**
  - Final: (silver) Spartak Moscow Region (Russia) 59–68 (gold) (Spain) **Halcon Avenida Salamanca**
    - Halcon Avenida Salamanca avenge their 2009 final defeat by Spartak Moscow Region, ending Spartak's run of four consecutive titles, and winning their first title.

==== Curling ====
- World Men's Championship in Regina, Saskatchewan, Canada:
  - Bronze medal game: Norway 6–7 (bronze) **Sweden**
  - Gold medal game: (gold) **Canada** 6–5 (silver) Scotland
    - Canada win the world title for the second successive year and the 33rd time overall. Canadian skip Jeff Stoughton wins his second world title, fifteen years after winning his first, also against Scotland.

==== Cycling ====
- UCI World Tour:
  - Paris–Roubaix: (gold) Johan Vansummeren (BEL) (Garmin–Cervélo) 6h 07' 28" (silver) Fabian Cancellara (SUI) (Leopard Trek) + 19" (bronze) Maarten Tjallingii (NED) (Rabobank) + 19"
    - World Tour standings (after 9 of 27 races): (1) Cancellara 236 points (2) Matthew Goss (AUS) (HTC–Highroad) 203 (3) Andreas Klöden (GER) (Team RadioShack) & Michele Scarponi (ITA) (Lampre–ISD) 202

==== Football (soccer) ====
- CONCACAF Under-20 Championship in Guatemala City, Guatemala:
  - Third place match (winner qualifies for the Pan American Games): (bronze) **Guatemala** 0–0 (7–6 pen.) Panama
  - Final: (silver) Costa Rica 1–3 (gold) **Mexico**
- (Cyprus) First Division, matchday 28 (team in **bold** qualifies for the UEFA Champions League, team in italics qualifies for the UEFA Europa League):
  - **APOEL** 2–0 Omonia
  - Anorthosis 2–0 AEK
    - Standings: APOEL 68 points, Omonia 55, Anorthosis 48, AEK 42.
    - APOEL win the title for a record 21st time.
- (Luxembourg) National Division, matchday 21 (team in **bold** qualify for the UEFA Champions League):
  - Progrès Niedercorn 2–1 UN Käerjéng
  - RM Hamm Benfica 2–0 Differdange 03
    - Standings: **F91 Dudelange** 52 points, UN Käerjéng 36, Differdange 03, Fola Esch, Progrès Niedercorn 34.
      - F91 Dudelange win the title for the ninth time in twelve seasons.

==== Golf ====
- Men's majors:
  - Masters Tournament in Augusta, Georgia, United States: (1) Charl Schwartzel (RSA) 274 (−14) (T2) Jason Day (AUS) & Adam Scott (AUS) 276 (−12)
    - Schwartzel joins Trevor Immelman and Gary Player and becomes the third South African to win the Masters, and the seventh South African to win a major.

==== Gymnastics ====
- European Artistic Gymnastics Championships in Berlin, Germany:
  - Men:
    - Vault: (gold) Thomas Bouhail (FRA) 16.362 points (silver) Samir Aït Saïd (FRA) 16.262 (bronze) Anton Golotsutskov (RUS) 16.125
      - Bouhail wins his second European vault title.
    - Parallel bars: (gold) Marcel Nguyen (GER) 15.525 points (silver) Epke Zonderland (NED) 15.300 (bronze) Vasileios Tsolakidis (GRE) 15.075
    - Horizontal bar: (gold) Epke Zonderland (NED) 15.575 points (silver) Philipp Boy (GER) 15.350 (bronze) Marcel Nguyen (GER) 15.300
  - Women:
    - Balance beam: (gold) Anna Dementyeva (RUS) 15.350 points (silver) Carlotta Ferlito (ITA) 14.500 (bronze) Elisabetta Preziosa (ITA) 14.325
      - Dementyeva wins her second title of the championships.
    - Floor: (gold) Sandra Izbaşa (ROU) 14.500 points (silver) Diana Chelaru (ROU) 14.475 (bronze) Yulia Belokobylskaya (RUS) 14.450
      - Izbaşa wins her second title of the championships, third title on floor and fifth overall.

==== Rugby union ====
- Heineken Cup quarter-finals:
  - **Northampton Saints** (England) 23–13 (Ireland) Ulster in Milton Keynes
  - Biarritz (France) 20–27 (a.e.t.) (France) **Toulouse** in San Sebastián

==== Tennis ====
- ATP World Tour:
  - Grand Prix Hassan III in Casablanca, Morocco:
    - Final: **Pablo Andújar** (ESP) def. Potito Starace (ITA) 6–1, 6–2
      - Andújar wins his first ATP Tour title.
  - US Men's Clay Court Championships in Houston, Texas, United States:
    - Final: **Ryan Sweeting** (USA) def. Kei Nishikori (JPN) 6–4, 7–6(3)
      - Sweeting wins his first ATP Tour title.
- WTA Tour:
  - Family Circle Cup in Charleston, South Carolina, United States:
    - Final: **Caroline Wozniacki** (DEN) def. Elena Vesnina (RUS) 6–2, 6–3
      - Wozniacki wins her third title of the year and 15th of her career.
  - Andalucia Tennis Experience in Marbella, Spain:
    - Final: **Victoria Azarenka** (BLR) def. Irina-Camelia Begu (ROM) 6–3, 6–2
      - Azarenka wins her second title in as many weeks, and the seventh of her career.

==== Triathlon ====
- ITU World Championships, Leg 1 in Sydney, Australia:
  - Men: (gold) Javier Gómez (ESP) 1:50:22 (silver) Jonathan Brownlee (GBR) 1:50:29 (bronze) Sven Riederer (SUI) 1:50:34
  - Women: (gold) Paula Findlay (CAN) 2:01:21 (silver) Barbara Riveros Diaz (CHI) 2:01:24 (bronze) Andrea Hewitt (NZL) 2:01:29

=== April 9, 2011 (Saturday) ===
==== Auto racing ====
- Sprint Cup Series:
  - Samsung Mobile 500 in Fort Worth, Texas: (1) (Wisconsin) Matt Kenseth (Ford; Roush Fenway Racing) (2) (Kansas) Clint Bowyer (Chevrolet; Richard Childress Racing) (3) (Missouri) Carl Edwards (Ford; Roush Fenway Racing)
    - Drivers' championship standings (after 7 of 36 races): (1) Edwards 256 points (2) (Nevada) Kyle Busch (Toyota; Joe Gibbs Racing) 247 (3) Kenseth & (California) Jimmie Johnson (Chevrolet; Hendrick Motorsports) 243

==== Cricket ====
- Australia in Bangladesh:
  - 1st ODI in Mirpur: Australia 270/7 (50 overs; Michael Clarke 101); Bangladesh 210/5 (50 overs). **Australia win by 60 runs; lead 3-match series 1–0.**

==== Curling ====
- World Men's Championship in Regina, Saskatchewan, Canada:
  - Page playoffs 3 vs. 4: Sweden 2–7 **Norway**
  - Semifinal: **Scotland** 7–6 Norway

==== Cycling ====
- UCI World Tour:
  - Tour of the Basque Country, Stage 6: (gold) Tony Martin (GER) (HTC–Highroad) 32' 16" (silver) Andreas Klöden (GER) (Team RadioShack) + 9" (bronze) Marco Pinotti (ITA) (HTC–Highroad) + 24"
    - Final general classification: (1) Klöden 22h 12' 11 (2) Chris Horner (USA) (Team RadioShack) + 47" (3) Robert Gesink (NED) (Rabobank) + 47"
    - World Tour standings (after 8 of 27 races): (1) Matthew Goss (AUS) (HTC–Highroad) 203 points (2) Klöden & Michele Scarponi (ITA) (Lampre–ISD) 202

==== Football (soccer) ====
- South American Under-17 Championship in Quito, Ecuador: (teams in **bold** qualify for the FIFA U-17 World Cup and Pan American Games)
  - Final stage:
    - Paraguay 1–2 Colombia
    - **Ecuador** 1–1 **Uruguay**
    - **Argentina** 2–3 **Brazil**
      - Final standings: Brazil 13 points, Uruguay 9, Argentina 7, Ecuador 6, Colombia 4, Paraguay 1.
      - Brazil win the title for the fourth successive time and tenth overall.
- UEFA Women's Champions League semi-finals, first leg:
  - Duisburg (Germany) 2–2 (Germany) Turbine Potsdam
  - Lyon (France) 2–0 (England) Arsenal

==== Golf ====
- Men's majors:
  - Masters Tournament in Augusta, Georgia, United States:
    - Leaderboard after third round: (1) Rory McIlroy (NIR) 204 (−12) (T2) Jason Day (AUS), K. J. Choi (KOR), Ángel Cabrera (ARG) & Charl Schwartzel (RSA) 208 (−8)

==== Gymnastics ====
- European Artistic Gymnastics Championships in Berlin, Germany:
  - Men:
    - Floor: (gold) Flavius Koczi (ROU) 15.500 (silver) Alexander Shatilov (ISR) 15.400 (bronze) Anton Golotsutskov (RUS) 15.325
      - Koczi wins his second European title.
    - Pommel horse: (gold) Krisztián Berki (HUN) 15.625 (silver) Cyril Tommasone (FRA) 15.050 (bronze) Harutyum Merdinyan (ARM) 14.950
      - Berki wins his fifth European pommel horse title.
    - Rings: (gold) Konstantin Pluzhnikov (RUS) 15.850 (silver) Aleksandr Balandin (RUS) 15.775 (bronze) Eleftherios Petrounias (GRE) 15.675
  - Women:
    - Vault: (gold) Sandra Izbaşa (ROU) 14.675 (silver) Oksana Chusovitina (GER) 14.537 (bronze) Ariella Kaeslin (SUI) 14.475
      - Izbaşa wins her fourth European title.
    - Uneven bars: (gold) Beth Tweddle (GBR) 15.100 (silver) Tatiana Nabieva (RUS) 15.075 (bronze) Kim Bui (GER) 14.675
      - Tweddle wins her fourth European title on uneven bars and sixth title overall.

==== Horse racing ====
- Grand National in Aintree, England: (gold) Ballabriggs (trainer: Donald McCain Jr.; jockey: Jason Maguire) (silver) Oscar Time (trainer: Martin Lynch; jockey: Sam Waley-Cohen) (bronze) Don't Push It (trainer: Jonjo O'Neill; jockey: Tony McCoy)

==== Ice hockey ====
- NCAA Men's Frozen Four in St. Paul, Minnesota:
  - Championship Game: Minnesota–Duluth 3, Michigan 2 (OT)
    - The Bulldogs win their first national title.

==== Mixed martial arts ====
- Strikeforce: Diaz vs. Daley in San Diego, California, United States:
  - Welterweight Championship bout: **Nick Diaz** (USA) (c) def. Paul Daley (ENG) via TKO (punches)
  - Lightweight Championship bout: **Gilbert Melendez** (USA) (c) def. Tatsuya Kawajiri (JPN) via TKO (strikes)
  - Light Heavyweight bout: Gegard Mousasi (ARM) and Keith Jardine (USA) fought to a majority draw (29–27, 28–28, 28–28)
  - Lightweight bout: **Shinya Aoki** (JPN) def. Lyle Beerbohm (USA) via submission (neck crank)

==== Rugby union ====
- Heineken Cup quarter-finals:
  - **Leinster** (Ireland) 17–10 (England) Leicester Tigers in Dublin
  - **Perpignan** (France) 29–25 (France) Toulon in Barcelona
- Amlin Challenge Cup quarter-finals:
  - Brive (France) 37–42 (Ireland) **Munster**

==== Synchronized skating ====
- World Championships in Helsinki, Finland:
  - Final standings: (gold) Rockettes (FIN) 215.43 (silver) Marigold IceUnity (FIN) 213.48 (bronze) Haydenettes (USA) 205.40
    - Rockettes win the title for the second successive time and third time in four years.
    - Finland win the title for the sixth time.

=== April 8, 2011 (Friday) ===
==== Auto racing ====
- Nationwide Series:
  - O'Reilly 300 in Fort Worth, Texas: (1) (Missouri) Carl Edwards (Ford; Roush Fenway Racing) (2) (Michigan) Brad Keselowski (Dodge; Penske Racing) (3) (Wisconsin) Paul Menard (Chevrolet; Kevin Harvick Incorporated)
    - Drivers' championship standings (after 6 of 34 races): (1) (Mississippi) Ricky Stenhouse Jr. (Ford; Roush Fenway Racing) 218 points (2) (California) Jason Leffler (Chevrolet; Turner Motorsports) 204 (3) (Illinois) Justin Allgaier (Chevrolet; Turner Motorsports) 194

==== Basketball ====
- EuroLeague Women Final Four in Yekaterinburg, Russia:
  - Semifinals:
    - **Spartak Moscow Region** (Russia) 54–43 (Russia) UMMC Ekaterinburg
    - Ros Casares Valencia (Spain) 49–61 (Spain) **Halcon Avenida Salamanca**

==== Curling ====
- World Men's Championship in Regina, Saskatchewan, Canada:
  - Tiebreaker: France 4–5 **Norway**
  - Page playoffs 1 vs. 2: **Canada** 5–2 Scotland

==== Cycling ====
- UCI World Tour:
  - Tour of the Basque Country, Stage 5: (gold) Francesco Gavazzi (ITA) (Lampre–ISD) 4h 27' 03" (silver) Kristof Vandewalle (BEL) (Quick-Step) s.t. (bronze) John Gadret (FRA) (Ag2r–La Mondiale) s.t.
    - General classification (after stage 5): (1) Joaquim Rodríguez (ESP) (Team Katusha) 21h 39' 46" (2) Andreas Klöden (GER) + 0" (3) Samuel Sánchez (ESP) (Euskaltel–Euskadi) + 0"

==== Football (soccer) ====
- CONCACAF Under-20 Championship in Guatemala City, Guatemala:
  - Semifinals: (winners qualify for the Pan American Games)
    - **Mexico** 4–1 Panama
    - **Costa Rica** 2–1 Guatemala

==== Golf ====
- Men's majors:
  - Masters Tournament in Augusta, Georgia, United States:
    - Leaderboard after second round: (1) Rory McIlroy (NIR) 134 (−10) (2) Jason Day (AUS) 136 (−8) (T3) K. J. Choi (KOR) & Tiger Woods (USA) 137 (−7)
      - Day shoots a 64, the lowest score ever by a Masters rookie.

==== Gymnastics ====
- European Artistic Gymnastics Championships in Berlin, Germany:
  - Men's Individual all-around: (gold) Philipp Boy (GER) 88.875 points (silver) Flavius Koczi (ROU) 88.825 (bronze) Daniel Purvis (GBR) & Mykola Kuksenkov (UKR) 88.350
  - Women's Individual all-around: (gold) Anna Dementyeva (RUS) 57.475 points (silver) Elisabeth Seitz (GER) 56.700 (bronze) Amelia Racea (ROM) 56.600

==== Rugby union ====
- Amlin Challenge Cup quarter-finals:
  - **Stade Français** (France) 32–28 (France) Montpellier
  - **Harlequins** (England) 32–22 (England) London Wasps

==== Synchronized skating ====
- World Championships in Helsinki, Finland:
  - Short program: (1) Rockettes (FIN) 74.81 (2) Marigold IceUnity (FIN) 73.54 (3) Haydenettes (USA) 71.16

=== April 7, 2011 (Thursday) ===
==== Basketball ====
- Euroleague Quarterfinals: (best-of-5 series)
  - Game 5: Real Madrid (Spain) 66–58 (Spain) Power Electronics Valencia. **Real Madrid win series 3–2.**

==== Curling ====
- World Men's Championship in Regina, Saskatchewan, Canada (teams in **bold** advance to the playoffs, teams in italics advance to a tiebreaker game):
  - Draw 15:
    - **Scotland** 6–1 France
    - **Canada** 5–4 China
    - South Korea 4–8 Sweden
    - Germany 7–3 Denmark
  - Draw 16:
    - Czech Republic 9–8 Germany
    - **Sweden** 7–4 Switzerland
    - China 1–3 Norway
    - **Scotland** 7–6 United States
  - Draw 17:
    - South Korea 6–7 Switzerland
    - Denmark 5–6 Czech Republic
    - United States 7–9 France
    - Norway 7–6 **Canada**
      - Final standings: Canada 10–1; Scotland 9–2; Sweden, France, Norway 7–4; Germany, Switzerland 6–5; Czech Republic 5–6; China 4–7; United States 3–8; South Korea 2–9; Denmark 0–11.

==== Cycling ====
- UCI World Tour:
  - Tour of the Basque Country, Stage 4: (gold) Samuel Sánchez (ESP) (Euskaltel–Euskadi) 4h 42' 34" (silver) Andreas Klöden (GER) (Team RadioShack) s.t. (bronze) Alexander Vinokourov (KAZ) (Astana) s.t.
    - General classification (after stage 4): (1) Joaquim Rodríguez (ESP) (Team Katusha) 17h 12' 43" (2) Klöden + 0" (3) Sánchez + 0"

==== Darts ====
- Premier League, week 9 in Aberdeen, Scotland:
  - Gary Anderson (SCO) 8–3 Terry Jenkins (ENG)
  - Adrian Lewis (ENG) 3–8 James Wade (ENG)
  - Mark Webster (WAL) 1–8 Phil Taylor (ENG)
  - Raymond van Barneveld (NED) 5–8 Simon Whitlock (AUS)
    - Standings (after 9 matches): Taylor 16 points, Anderson 12, Whitlock, van Barneveld 10, Lewis 9, Wade 6, Jenkins 5, Webster 4.

==== Football (soccer) ====
- UEFA Europa League quarter-finals, first leg:
  - Porto (Portugal) 5–1 (Russia) Spartak Moscow
  - Benfica (Portugal) 4–1 (Netherlands) PSV Eindhoven
  - Villarreal (Spain) 5–1 (Netherlands) Twente
  - Dynamo Kyiv (Ukraine) 1–1 (Portugal) Braga
- Copa Libertadores second stage (teams in **bold** advance to the knockout stage):
  - Group 2: **Grêmio** (Brazil) 2–0 (Colombia) **Junior**
    - Standings (after 5 matches): Junior 12 points, Grêmio 10, (Peru) León de Huánuco 4, (Bolivia) Oriente Petrolero 3.
  - Group 4: Universidad Católica (Chile) 0–0 (Argentina) Vélez Sarsfield
    - Standings (after 5 matches): (Venezuela) Caracas 9 points, Universidad Católica 8, Vélez Sársfield 7, (Chile) Unión Española 4.
  - Group 6: Jorge Wilstermann (Bolivia) 0–0 (Ecuador) Emelec
    - Standings (after 5 matches): (Brazil) Internacional 10 points, (Mexico) Chiapas 9, Emelec 8, Jorge Wilstermann 1.

==== Golf ====
- Men's majors:
  - Masters Tournament in Augusta, Georgia, United States:
    - Leaderboard after first round: (T1) Rory McIlroy (NIR) & Álvaro Quirós (ESP) 65 (−7) (T3) Y. E. Yang (KOR) & K. J. Choi (KOR) 67 (−5)

==== Ice hockey ====
- NCAA Men's Frozen Four Semifinals in St. Paul, Minnesota:
  - Minnesota–Duluth 4, Notre Dame 3
  - Michigan 2, North Dakota 0

==== Rugby union ====
- Amlin Challenge Cup quarter-finals:
  - La Rochelle (France) 13–23 (France) **Clermont**

=== April 6, 2011 (Wednesday) ===
==== Curling ====
- World Men's Championship in Regina, Saskatchewan, Canada: (teams in **bold** advance to the playoffs)
  - Draw 12:
    - Denmark 2–9 Norway
    - United States 8–4 South Korea
    - Czech Republic 4–9 Canada
    - Switzerland 7–8 France
  - Draw 13:
    - **Canada** 10–6 Sweden
    - Germany 6–5 France
    - Denmark 3–7 Scotland
    - South Korea 5–9 China
  - Draw 14:
    - United States 4–5 China
    - Norway 7–5 Scotland
    - Germany 7–4 Switzerland
    - Czech Republic 6–5 Sweden
      - Standings (after Draw 14): Canada 9–0; Scotland 7–2; France 6–3; Germany, Norway, Sweden, Switzerland 5–4; China 4–5; Czech Republic, United States 3–6; South Korea 2–7; Denmark 0–9.

==== Cycling ====
- UCI World Tour:
  - Tour of the Basque Country, Stage 3: (gold) Alexander Vinokourov (KAZ) (Astana) 4h 20' 38" (2) Óscar Freire (ESP) (Rabobank) + 8" (3) Paul Martens (GER) (Rabobank) + 8"
    - General classification (after stage 3): (1) Joaquim Rodríguez (ESP) (Team Katusha) 12h 30' 09" (2) Andreas Klöden (GER) (Team RadioShack) + 0" (3) Samuel Sánchez (ESP) (Euskaltel–Euskadi) + 0"

==== Football (soccer) ====
- CONCACAF Under-20 Championship in Guatemala City, Guatemala:
  - Quarterfinals: (winners qualify for FIFA U-20 World Cup)
    - Honduras 0–2 **Panama**
    - United States 1–2 **Guatemala**
- South American Under-17 Championship in Quito, Ecuador: (teams in **bold** qualify for the FIFA U-17 World Cup and Pan American Games)
  - Final stage:
    - **Uruguay** 3–2 Colombia
    - **Argentina** 1–2 **Ecuador**
    - **Brazil** 3–1 Paraguay
      - Standings (after 4 matches): Brazil 10 points, Uruguay 8, Argentina 7, Ecuador 5, Colombia, Paraguay 1.
- UEFA Champions League quarter-finals, first leg:
  - Chelsea (England) 0–1 (England) Manchester United
  - Barcelona (Spain) 5–1 (Ukraine) Shakhtar Donetsk
- Copa Libertadores second stage:
  - Group 3:
    - Nacional (Uruguay) 2–0 (Brazil) Fluminense
    - América (Mexico) 2–1 (Argentina) Argentinos Juniors
      - Standings (after 5 matches): América 9 points, Argentinos Juniors, Nacional 7, Fluminense 5.
  - Group 4: Unión Española (Chile) 1–2 (Venezuela) Caracas
    - Standings: Caracas 9 points (5 matches), (Chile) Universidad Católica 7 (4), (Argentina) Vélez Sarsfield 6 (4), Unión Española 4 (5).
  - Group 5:
    - Deportivo Táchira (Venezuela) 0–2 (Paraguay) Cerro Porteño
    - Santos (Brazil) 3–2 (Chile) Colo-Colo
      - Standings (after 4 matches): Cerro Porteño 8 points, Colo-Colo 6, Santos 5, Deportivo Táchira 2.
  - Group 6: Chiapas (Mexico) 1–0 (Brazil) Internacional
    - Standings: Internacional 10 points (5 matches), Jaguares 9 (5), (Ecuador) Emelec 7 (4), (Bolivia) Jorge Wilstermann 0 (4).
- AFC Champions League group stage, matchday 3:
  - Group B: Esteghlal (Iran) 4–2 (Uzbekistan) Pakhtakor
    - Standings (after 3 matches): (Qatar) Al-Sadd 7 points, Esteghlal, (Saudi Arabia) Al-Nassr 4, Pakhtakor 1.
  - Group D:
    - Al-Rayyan (Qatar) 1–3 (Iran) Zob Ahan
    - Al-Shabab (Saudi Arabia) 4–1 (United Arab Emirates) Emirates
      - Standings (after 3 matches): Zob Ahan 7 points, Al-Shabab 5, Emirates 3, Al-Rayyan 1.
  - Group F:
    - Nagoya Grampus (Japan) 1–1 (South Korea) FC Seoul
    - Hangzhou Greentown (China) 0–0 (United Arab Emirates) Al-Ain
      - Standings: FC Seoul 7 points (3 matches), Hangzhou Greentown 4 (3), Al-Ain, Nagoya Grampus 1 (2).
  - Group H:
    - Sydney FC (Australia) 1–1 (China) Shanghai Shenhua
    - Suwon Samsung Bluewings (South Korea) 1–1 (Japan) Kashima Antlers
      - Standings: Suwon Samsung Bluewings 5 points (3 matches), Kashima Antlers, Sydney FC 2 (2), Shanghai Shenhua 2 (3).
- CONCACAF Champions League semifinals, second leg (first leg score in parentheses):
  - Cruz Azul (Mexico) 1–1 (1–2) (Mexico) **Monterrey**. Monterrey win 3–2 on aggregate.

=== April 5, 2011 (Tuesday) ===
==== Basketball ====
- NCAA Division I Women's Tournament:
  - Championship Game in Indianapolis: Texas A&M 76, Notre Dame 70
    - The Aggies finish their first Final Four appearance with their first national title.

==== Curling ====
- World Men's Championship in Regina, Saskatchewan, Canada:
  - Draw 9:
    - China 3–5 Scotland
    - Switzerland 7–4 Norway
    - Sweden 8–7 Germany
    - United States 8–4 Czech Republic
  - Draw 10:
    - Switzerland 8–6 Czech Republic
    - France 5–11 Canada
    - Norway 7–6 United States
    - Denmark 8–10 South Korea
  - Draw 11:
    - Germany 9–3 South Korea
    - Sweden 9–3 Denmark
    - France 10–3 China
    - Canada 7–3 Scotland
      - Standings (after Draw 11): Canada 7–0; Scotland 6–1; France, Sweden, Switzerland 5–2; Germany, Norway 3–4; China, Czech Republic, South Korea, United States 2–5; Denmark 0–7.

==== Cycling ====
- UCI World Tour:
  - Tour of the Basque Country, Stage 2: (gold) Vasil Kiryienka (BLR) (Movistar Team) 4h 06' 39" (silver) Andreas Klöden (GER) (Team RadioShack) + 2" (bronze) Andy Schleck (LUX) (Leopard Trek) + 2"
    - General classification (after stage 2): (1) Klöden 8h 09' 23" (2) Joaquim Rodríguez (ESP) (Team Katusha) + 0" (3) Samuel Sánchez (ESP) (Euskaltel–Euskadi) + 0"

==== Football (soccer) ====
- CONCACAF Under-20 Championship in Guatemala City, Guatemala:
  - Quarterfinals: (winners qualify for FIFA U-20 World Cup)
    - **Costa Rica** 6–1 Cuba
    - **Mexico** 3–0 Canada
- UEFA Champions League quarter-finals, first leg:
  - Real Madrid (Spain) 4–0 (England) Tottenham Hotspur
  - Internazionale (Italy) 2–5 (Germany) Schalke 04
- Copa Libertadores second stage (team in **bold** advance to the knockout stage):
  - Group 8: Independiente (Argentina) 1–1 (Ecuador) LDU Quito
    - Standings (after 5 matches): (Uruguay) **Peñarol** 9 points, LDU Quito, (Argentina) Godoy Cruz 7, Independiente 5.
- AFC Champions League group stage, matchday 3: (team in **bold** advances to the Round of 16)
  - Group A:
    - Sepahan (Iran) 2–0 (Qatar) Al-Gharafa
    - Al-Hilal (Saudi Arabia) 3–1 (United Arab Emirates) Al-Jazira
      - Standings (after 3 matches): Sepahan 9 points, Al-Hilal 6, Al-Gharafa, Al-Jazira 1.
  - Group B: Al-Sadd (Qatar) 1–0 (Saudi Arabia) Al-Nassr
    - Standings: Al-Sadd 7 points (3 matches), Al-Nassr 4 (3), (Uzbekistan) Pakhtakor, (Iran) Esteghlal 1 (2).
  - Group C:
    - Bunyodkor (Uzbekistan) 0–0 (Iran) Persepolis
    - Al-Wahda (United Arab Emirates) 0–3 (Saudi Arabia) **Al-Ittihad**
      - Standings (after 3 matches): Al-Ittihad 9 points, Al-Wahda, Bunyodkor, Persepolis 2.
  - Group E:
    - Jeju United (South Korea) 2–1 (Japan) Gamba Osaka
    - Tianjin Teda (China) 1–1 (Australia) Melbourne Victory
      - Standings (after 3 matches): Tianjin Teda 7 points, Jeju United 6, Gamba Osaka 3, Melbourne Victory 1.
  - Group G:
    - Arema (Indonesia) 1–1 (China) Shandong Luneng
    - Cerezo Osaka (Japan) 1–0 (South Korea) Jeonbuk Hyundai Motors
      - Standings (after 3 matches): Jeonbuk Hyundai Motors, Cerezo Osaka 6 points, Shandong Luneng 4, Arema 1.
- CONCACAF Champions League semifinals, second leg (first leg score in parentheses):
  - Saprissa (Costa Rica) 2–1 (0–2) (United States) **Real Salt Lake**. Real Salt Lake advance 3–2 on aggregate.

=== April 4, 2011 (Monday) ===
==== Basketball ====
- NCAA Division I Men's Tournament:
  - Championship Game in Houston (seeds with regionals in parentheses):
    - (West 3) Connecticut 53, (Southeast 8) Butler 41
      - The Huskies win their third national championship and first since 2004. The Bulldogs become the first team to lose in successive title games since Michigan's Fab Five in 1992 and 1993.
- Basketball Hall of Fame Class of 2011:
  - Players: Teresa Edwards, Artis Gilmore, Chris Mullin, Dennis Rodman, Arvydas Sabonis, Reece "Goose" Tatum
  - Coaches: Herb Magee, Tara VanDerveer, Tex Winter
  - Contributors: Tom "Satch" Sanders

==== Curling ====
- World Men's Championship in Regina, Saskatchewan, Canada:
  - Draw 6:
    - France 8–5 Denmark
    - China 1–9 Sweden
    - Canada 7–4 South Korea
    - Scotland 8–5 Germany
  - Draw 7:
    - Norway 8–5 Sweden
    - Germany 5–4 United States
    - Scotland 5–4 Czech Republic
    - China 1–7 Switzerland
  - Draw 8:
    - United States 3–5 Canada
    - South Korea 10–5 Czech Republic
    - Switzerland 8–6 Denmark
    - France 6–5 Norway
      - Standings (after Draw 8): Canada, Scotland 5–0; France 4–1; Sweden, Switzerland 3–2; China, Czech Republic, Germany, Norway 2–3; South Korea, United States 1–4; Denmark 0–5.

==== Cycling ====
- UCI World Tour:
  - Tour of the Basque Country, Stage 1 & General classification: (gold) Joaquim Rodríguez (ESP) (Team Katusha) 4h 02' 42" (silver) Samuel Sánchez (ESP) (Euskaltel–Euskadi) s.t. (bronze) Andreas Klöden (GER) (Team RadioShack) s.t.

=== April 3, 2011 (Sunday) ===
==== Auto racing ====
- Sprint Cup Series:
  - Goody's Fast Relief 500 in Ridgeway, Virginia: (1) (California) Kevin Harvick (Chevrolet; Richard Childress Racing) (2) (North Carolina) Dale Earnhardt Jr. (Chevrolet; Hendrick Motorsports) (3) (Nevada) Kyle Busch (Toyota; Joe Gibbs Racing)
    - Drivers' championship standings (after 6 of 36 races): (1) Busch 219 points (2) (Missouri) Carl Edwards (Ford; Roush Fenway Racing) 214 (3) (California) Jimmie Johnson (Chevrolet; Hendrick Motorsports) 207

==== Basketball ====
- Women's Division I Tournament – Final Four in Indianapolis (seeds with regionals in parentheses):
  - (Dallas 2) Texas A&M 63, (Spokane 1) Stanford 62
  - (Dayton 2) Notre Dame 72, (Philadelphia 1) Connecticut 63

==== Curling ====
- World Men's Championship in Regina, Saskatchewan, Canada:
  - Draw 3:
    - Czech Republic 7–5 Norway
    - Switzerland 6–4 United States
  - Draw 4:
    - South Korea 6–9 Scotland
    - Canada 7–4 Germany
    - China 7–6 Denmark
    - Sweden 7–6 France
  - Draw 5:
    - Sweden 11–2 United States
    - Scotland 10–6 Switzerland
    - Norway 8–9 Germany
    - Czech Republic 8–5 China
      - Standings (after Draw 5): Canada, Scotland 3–0; China, Czech Republic, France, Sweden 2–1; Germany, Norway, Switzerland, United States 1–2; Denmark, South Korea 0–3.

==== Cycling ====
- UCI World Tour:
  - Tour of Flanders: (gold) Nick Nuyens (BEL) (Saxo Bank–SunGard) 6h 00' 42" (silver) Sylvain Chavanel (FRA) (Quick-Step) s.t. (bronze) Fabian Cancellara (SUI) (Leopard Trek) s.t.
    - World Tour standings (after 7 of 27 races): (1) Matthew Goss (AUS) (HTC–Highroad) 203 points (2) Michele Scarponi (ITA) (Lampre–ISD) 202 (3) Cancellara 156

==== Football (soccer) ====
- South American Under-17 Championship in Ecuador:
  - Final stage:
    - Paraguay 1–3 Uruguay
    - Argentina 2–1 Colombia
    - Brazil 3–1 Ecuador
      - Standings (after 3 matches): Brazil, Argentina 7 points, Uruguay 5, Ecuador 2, Colombia, Paraguay 1.
- CAF Champions League First round, second leg: (first leg score in parentheses)
  - Simba (Tanzania) 2–3 (1–3) (Democratic Republic of the Congo) **TP Mazembe**. TP Mazembe win 6–3 on aggregate.
  - **Enyimba** (Nigeria) 2–1 (0–0) (Gabon) US Bitam. Enyimba win 2–1 on aggregate.
  - **Cotonsport** (Cameroon) 1–0 (1–0) (Democratic Republic of the Congo) AS Vita Club. Cotonsport win 2–0 on aggregate.
  - ASPAC (Benin) 2–0 (0–5) (Tunisia) **Espérance ST**. Espérance ST win 5–2 on aggregate.
  - Kano Pillars (Nigeria) 0–0 (0–2) (Morocco) **Wydad Casablanca**. Wydad Casablanca win 2–0 on aggregate.
  - ASFA Yennenga (Burkina Faso) 3–4 (0–2) (Algeria) **ES Sétif**. ES Sétif win 6–3 on aggregate.
  - **MC Alger** (Algeria) 3–0 (1–4) (Zimbabwe) Dynamos. 4–4 on aggregate, MC Alger win on away goals.
- CAF Confederation Cup First round, second leg: (first leg score in parentheses)
  - **AS Adema** (Madagascar) 2–0 (1–1) (South Africa) Wits. AS Adema win 3–1 on aggregate.
  - Foullah Edifice (Chad) 1–0 (0–2) (Nigeria) **Kaduna United**. Kaduna United win 2–1 on aggregate.
  - AC Léopard (Republic of the Congo) 1–0 (0–2) (Angola) **1º de Agosto**. 1º de Agosto win 2–1 on aggregate.
  - Tiko United (Cameroon) 0–1 (0–2) (Nigeria) **Sunshine Stars**. Sunshine Stars win 3–0 on aggregate.
  - **Motema Pembe** (Democratic Republic of the Congo) 1–0 (1–1) (Uganda) Victors. Motema Pembe win 2–1 on aggregate.
  - Sahel SC (Niger) 1–2 (0–0) (Morocco) **Maghreb Fez**. Maghreb Fez win 2–1 on aggregate.
  - Ashanti Gold (Ghana) 2–1 (0–3) (Tunisia) **Étoile Sahel**. Étoile Sahel win 4–2 on aggregate.
- CAF Confederation Cup First round, only leg: USFA (Burkina Faso) – (Ivory Coast) Africa Sports postponed
- (Portugal) Primeira Liga, matchday 25 (teams in **bold** qualify for the Champions League):
  - **Benfica** 1–2 **Porto**
    - Standings: Porto 71 points, Benfica 55, Braga 40
    - Porto win the title for the 25th time.

==== Golf ====
- Women's major:
  - Kraft Nabisco Championship in Rancho Mirage, California, United States:
    - Final leaderboard (USA unless stated): (1) Stacy Lewis 275 (−13) (2) Yani Tseng (TWN) 278 (−10) (T3) Katie Futcher, Morgan Pressel & Angela Stanford 284 (−4)
      - Lewis becomes the first player to win a major as her first LPGA Tour victory since Anna Nordqvist (SWE) won the 2009 LPGA Championship.
- PGA Tour:
  - Shell Houston Open in Humble, Texas:
    - Winner: Phil Mickelson (USA) 268 (−20)
      - Mickelson wins his 39th PGA Tour title.
- European Tour:
  - Trophée Hassan II in Agadir, Morocco:
    - Winner: David Horsey (ENG) 274 (−13)^{PO}
      - Horsey defeats defending champion Rhys Davies (WAL) & Jaco van Zyl (RSA) on the second playoff hole to win his second European Tour title.
- Champions Tour:
  - Mississippi Gulf Resort Classic in Biloxi, Mississippi:
    - Winner: Tom Lehman (USA) 200 (−16)
      - Lehman wins for the second time this season, and fourth time on the Champions Tour.

==== Motorcycle racing ====
- Moto GP:
  - Spanish Grand Prix in Jerez, Spain:
    - MotoGP: (1) Jorge Lorenzo (ESP) (Yamaha) (2) Dani Pedrosa (ESP) (Honda) (3) Nicky Hayden (USA) (Ducati)
      - Riders' championship standings (after 2 of 18 races): (1) Lorenzo 45 points (2) Pedrosa 36 (3) Casey Stoner (AUS) (Honda) 25
    - Moto2: (1) Andrea Iannone (ITA) (Suter) (2) Thomas Lüthi (SUI) (Suter) (3) Simone Corsi (ITA) (FTR)
      - Riders' championship standings (after 2 of 17 races): (1) Iannone 45 points (2) Stefan Bradl (GER) (Kalex) & Lüthi 36
    - 125cc: (1) Nicolás Terol (ESP) (Aprilia) (2) Jonas Folger (GER) (Aprilia) (3) Johann Zarco (FRA) (Derbi)
      - Riders' championship standings (after 2 of 17 races): (1) Terol 50 points (2) Folger 31 (3) Sandro Cortese (GER) (Aprilia) 30

==== Rugby union ====
- IRB Sevens World Series:
  - Adelaide Sevens in Adelaide:
    - Shield: **Kenya** 17–12 Spain
    - Bowl: Japan 12–33 **United States**
    - Plate: **South Africa** 26–19 Australia
    - Cup: **New Zealand** 29–17 England
      - Standings (after 6 of 8 competitions): (1) New Zealand 134 points (2) England 121 (3) Samoa 100

==== Snooker ====
- China Open in Beijing, China:
  - Final: **Judd Trump** (ENG) 10–8 Mark Selby (ENG)
    - Trump wins his first ranking and fourth professional title.

==== Tennis ====
- ATP World Tour:
  - Sony Ericsson Open in Miami, United States:
    - Final: **Novak Djokovic** (SRB) def. Rafael Nadal (ESP) 4–6, 6–3, 7–6(4)
      - Djokovic defeats Nadal in a final for the second time in three weeks, winning the tournament for the second time, for his fourth title of the year and 22nd of his career. He also extends his match record in 2011 to 24–0.

==== Wrestling ====
- European Championships in Dortmund, Germany:
  - Men Greco-Roman:
    - 60 kg: (gold) Revaz Lashkhi (GEO) (silver) Ivo Angelov (BUL) (bronze) Mustafa Saglam (TUR) & Hasan Aliyev (AZE)
    - 74 kg: (gold) Rafig Huseynov (AZE) (silver) Péter Bácsi (HUN) (bronze) Roman Vlasov (RUS) & Christophe Guenot (FRA)
    - 96 kg: (gold) Tsimafei Dzeinichenka (BLR) (silver) Artur Aleksanyan (ARM) (bronze) Shalva Gadabadze (AZE) & Elis Guri (BUL)

=== April 2, 2011 (Saturday) ===
==== Basketball ====
- Men's Division I Tournament – Final Four in Houston (seeds with regionals in parentheses):
  - (Southeast 8) Butler 70, (Southwest 11) Virginia Commonwealth 62
    - The Bulldogs become the first team to reach two consecutive championship games since Florida won the 2006 and 2007 national championships.
  - (West 3) Connecticut 56, (East 4) Kentucky 55
    - The Huskies reach the championship game for the third time.
- Women's National Invitation Tournament Final in Toledo, Ohio:
  - Toledo 76, USC 68
    - The Rockets win their first postseason championship of any type.

==== Cricket ====
- World Cup Final in Mumbai, India: Sri Lanka 274/6 (50 overs; Mahela Jayawardene 103); India 277/4 (48.2 overs). **India win by 6 wickets.**
  - India win the first all-Asian World Cup final, winning the tournament for the second time, and the first since 1983.

==== Curling ====
- World Men's Championship in Regina, Saskatchewan, Canada:
  - Draw 1:
    - Canada 8–4 Switzerland
    - United States 7–4 Denmark
    - Czech Republic 5–9 France
    - Norway 8–7 South Korea
  - Draw 2:
    - Germany 4–6 China
    - France 8–2 South Korea
    - Sweden 6–7 Scotland
    - Denmark 5–9 Canada

==== Football (soccer) ====
- CONCACAF U-20 Championship in Guatemala (teams in **bold** advance to the quarterfinals):
  - Group A: **Guatemala** 1–3 **Honduras**
    - Final standings: Honduras 6 points, Guatemala 3, Jamaica 0.
  - Group B: **United States** 2–0 **Panama**
    - Final standings: United States 6 points, Panama 3, Suriname 0.
- OFC Champions League Final, first leg:
  - Amicale (Vanuatu) 1–2 (New Zealand) Auckland City
- CAF Champions League First round, second leg: (first leg score in parentheses)
  - Recreativo Caála (Angola) 1–1 (0–3) (Sudan) **Al-Hilal**. Al-Hilal win 4–1 on aggregate.
  - Zamalek (Egypt) 2–1 (2–4) (Tunisia) Club Africain. Match abandoned due to crowd violence.
  - **Inter Luanda** (Angola) 2–0 (0–2) (Sudan) Al-Merreikh. 2–2 on aggregate; Inter Luanda win 3–2 on penalties.
  - Djoliba (Mali) 1–1 (0–3) (Senegal) **Diaraf**. Diaraf win 4–1 on aggregate.
  - SuperSport United (South Africa) 1–0 (0–2) (Egypt) **Al-Ahly**. Al-Ahly win 2–1 on aggregate.
  - **Raja Casablanca** (Morocco) 1–0 (1–2) (Mali) Stade Malien. 2–2 on aggregate; Raja Casablanca win on away goals.
  - Young Buffaloes (Eswatini) 0–2 (0–5) (Zambia) **ZESCO United**. ZESCO United win 7–0 on aggregate.
- CAF Confederation Cup First round, second leg: (first leg score in parentheses)
  - Nchanga Rangers (Zambia) 0–2 (0–1) (Democratic Republic of the Congo) **Saint Eloi Lupopo**. Saint Eloi Lupopo win 3–0 on aggregate.
  - Dedebit (Ethiopia) 1–1 (0–4) (Egypt) **Haras El Hodood**. Haras El Hodood win 5–1 on aggregate.
  - **Missile** (Gabon) 2–1 (1–1) (Sudan) Al-Nil Al-Hasahesa. Missile win 3–2 on aggregate.
  - Touré Kunda Footpro (Senegal) 2–1 (0–2) (Morocco) **FUS de Rabat**. FUS de Rabat win 3–2 on aggregate.
  - **Sofapaka** (Kenya) 4–0 (0–2) (Egypt) Ismaily. Sofapaka win 4–2 on aggregate.
  - **Difaa El Jadida** (Morocco) 3–0 (0–2) (Tunisia) Olympique Béja. Difaa El Jadida win 3–2 on aggregate.
  - ASC Tevragh-Zeïna (Mauritania) 1–2 (0–1) (Algeria) **JS Kabylie**. JS Kabylie win 3–1 on aggregate.
- (Northern Ireland) Irish League Cup in Lurgan:
  - **Lisburn Distillery** 2–1 Portadown
    - Distillery win the Cup for the first time.

==== Golf ====
- Women's major:
  - Kraft Nabisco Championship in Rancho Mirage, California, United States:
    - Leaderboard after third round (USA unless indicated): (1) Yani Tseng (TWN) 204 (−12) (2) Stacy Lewis 206 (−10) (3) Morgan Pressel 208 (−8)

==== Judo ====
- Pan American Championships in Guadalajara, Mexico:
  - Men's 55 kg: (gold) Fredy López (SLV) (silver) Youssef Youssef (CAN) (bronze) Hernan Birbrier (ARG) & Jordi Villegas (MEX)
  - Men's 60 kg: (gold) Felipe Kitadai (BRA) (silver) Nabor Castillo (MEX) (bronze) Frazer Will (CAN) & Antonio Bentancourt (CUB)
  - Men's 66 kg: (gold) Leandro Cunha (BRA) (silver) Ricardo Valderrama (VEN) (bronze) Angelo Gómez (CUB) & Michal Popiel (CAN)
  - Men's 73 kg: (gold) Bruno Mendonça (BRA) (silver) Ronald Girones (CUB) (bronze) Nick Delpopolo (USA) & Nicholas Tritton (CAN)
  - Women's 44 kg: (gold) Diana Cobos (ECU) (silver) Silvia González (MEX) (bronze) Alexa Liddie (USA)
  - Women's 48 kg: (gold) Paula Pareto (ARG) (silver) Dayaris Mestre (CUB) (bronze) Taciana Lima (BRA) & Edna Carrillo (MEX)
  - Women's 52 kg: (gold) Yanet Bermoy (CUB) (silver) Linouse Desravine (HAI) (bronze) Angelica Delgado (USA) & Érika Miranda (BRA)
  - Women's 57 kg: (gold) Yurisleidy Lupetey (CUB) (silver) Marti Malloy (USA) (bronze) Joliane Melançon (CAN) & Rafaela Silva (BRA)

==== Snooker ====
- China Open in Beijing, China, semi-finals:
  - Shaun Murphy (ENG) 1–6 **Judd Trump** (ENG)
  - Ding Junhui (CHN) 3–6 **Mark Selby** (ENG)

==== Tennis ====
- WTA Tour:
  - Sony Ericsson Open in Miami, United States:
    - Final: **Victoria Azarenka** (BLR) def. Maria Sharapova (RUS) 6–1, 6–4
      - Azarenka wins the tournament for the second time, and her sixth WTA Tour title.

==== Wrestling ====
- European Championships in Dortmund, Germany:
  - Men Greco-Roman:
    - 55 kg: (gold) Roman Amoyan (ARM) (silver) Vyugar Ragymov (UKR) (bronze) Elbek Tazhyiev (BUL) & Eldaniz Azizli (AZE)
    - 66 kg: (gold) Ambako Vachadze (RUS) (silver) Tamás Lórincz (HUN) (bronze) Vitaliy Rahimov (AZE) & Aleksandar Maksimovic (SRB)
    - 84 kg: (gold) Vasyl Rachyba (UKR) (silver) Alan Khugaev (RUS) (bronze) Artur Shahinyan (ARM) & Hristo Marinov (BUL)
    - 120 kg: (gold) Khasan Baroyev (RUS) (silver) Rıza Kayaalp (TUR) (bronze) Yuri Patrikeyev (ARM) & Mihály Deák-Bárdos (HUN)

=== April 1, 2011 (Friday) ===
==== Basketball ====
- College Basketball Invitational Final (best-of-3), Game 3 in Eugene, Oregon:
  - Oregon 71, Creighton 69. **Oregon wins series 2–1.**

==== Football (soccer) ====
- CONCACAF U-20 Championship in Guatemala (teams in **bold** advance to the quarterfinals):
  - Group C: **Costa Rica** 3–0 **Canada**
    - Final standings: Costa Rica 6 points, Canada 3, Guadeloupe 0.
  - Group D: **Mexico** 5–0 Trinidad and Tobago
    - Final standings: Mexico 6 points, **Cuba**, Trinidad and Tobago 1.

==== Golf ====
- Women's major:
  - Kraft Nabisco Championship in Rancho Mirage, California, United States:
    - Leaderboard after second round (USA unless stated): (1) Stacy Lewis 135 (−9) (T2) Yani Tseng (TWN), Jane Park & Brittany Lincicome 138 (−6)

==== Judo ====
- Pan American Championships in Guadalajara, Mexico:
  - Men's 81 kg: (gold) Leandro Guilheiro (BRA) (silver) Travis Stevens (USA) (bronze) Emmanuel Lucenti (ARG) & Antonie Valois-Fortier (CAN)
  - Men's 90 kg: (gold) Asley González (CUB) (silver) Alexandre Emond (CAN) (bronze) Rodrigo Luna (BRA) & José Camacho (VEN)
  - Men's 100 kg: (gold) Oreidis Despaigne (CUB) (silver) Leonardo Leite (BRA) (bronze) Cristian Schimidt (ARG) & Kyle Vashkulat (USA)
  - Men's +100 kg: (gold) Oscar Braison (CUB) (silver) Rafael Silva (BRA) (bronze) Orlando Baccino (ARG) & Luis Ignacio Salazar (COL)
  - Women's 63 kg: (gold) Yaritza Abel (CUB) (silver) Mariana Silva (BRA) (bronze) Christal Ransom (USA) & Myriam Lamarche (CAN)
  - Women's 70 kg: (gold) Onix Cortés (CUB) (silver) Maria Portela (BRA) (bronze) Kelita Zupancic (CAN) & Yuri Alvear (COL)
  - Women's 78 kg: (gold) Kayla Harrison (USA) (silver) Mayra Aguiar (BRA) (bronze) Anny Cortez (COL) & Yalennis Castillo (CUB)
  - Women's +78 kg: (gold) Idalys Ortiz (CUB) (silver) Vanessa Zambotti (MEX) (bronze) Melissa Mojica (PUR) & Maria Suelen Altheman (BRA)

==== Snooker ====
- China Open in Beijing, China, quarter-finals:
  - John Higgins (SCO) 2–5 **Shaun Murphy** (ENG)
  - **Judd Trump** (ENG) 5–1 Peter Ebdon (ENG)
  - Stephen Lee (ENG) 2–5 **Ding Junhui** (CHN)
  - **Mark Selby** (ENG) 5–1 Ali Carter (ENG)

==== Wrestling ====
- European Championships in Dortmund, Germany:
  - Women:
    - 59 kg: (gold) Yuliya Ratkevich (AZE) (silver) Georgiana Paic (ROU) (bronze) Olga Butkevych (GBR) & Ganna Vasylenko (UKR)
    - 63 kg: (gold) Yuliya Ostapchuk (UKR) (silver) Taybe Yusein (BUL) (bronze) Inna Trazhukova (RUS) & Olesya Zamula (AZE)
    - 67 kg: (gold) Nadya Sementsova (AZE) (silver) Alina Makhynia (UKR) (bronze) Yvonne English (GER) & Hanna Savenia (BLR)
    - 72 kg: (gold) Kateryna Burmistrova (UKR) (silver) Vasilisa Marzaliuk (BLR) (bronze) Stanka Zlateva (BUL) & Agnieszka Wieszczek (POL)
