= 2012–13 Al Ahly SC season =

2012–13 season
- Chairman: Hassan Hamdy
- Manager: Hossam El-Badry
- Egyptian Premier League: Group A 1st
- Egyptian Super Cup 2012: Winner
- CAF Champions League: Winner
- FIFA Club World Cup: Fourth place
Home colours	Away colours

The 2012-2013 season of the Al Ahly football club.

== Egyptian Premier League ==
Pos	Team	Pld	W	D	L	GF	GA	GD	Pts	Qualification
1	Al Ahly (Q)	15	13	0	2	27	10	+17	39	Qualification for Championship Playoff
2	Enppi (Q)	15	8	5	2	24	15	+9	29	Qualification for Championship Playoff
3	Smouha	16	7	6	3	19	9	+10	27	
4	Telephonat Bani Sweif	15	5	6	4	10	10	0	21	
5	Haras El Hodood	15	4	5	6	14	16	−2	17	
6	El Gouna	15	3	5	7	12	19	−7	14	
7	Wadi Degla	15	4	2	9	12	20	−8	14	Relegation Playoff
8	Misr El Makasa	15	2	6	7	9	17	−8	12	Relegation Playoff
9	Ghazl El Mahalla	15	2	5	8	14	25	−11	11	Relegation Playoff

Source: RSSSF
Rules for classification: 1) points; 2) goal difference; 3) number of goals scored.
(Q) Qualified for the phase indicated

2 February 2013	Al-Ahly	1 – 0	Ghazl El Mahalla	30 June Stadium, Cairo
16:00 UTC+02:00	Dominique 12'			Attendance: 0 Referee: Mohamed Abbas

10 February 2013	Al-Ahly	1 – 0	Wadi Degla	30 June Stadium, Cairo
17:00 UTC+02:00	Gomaa 52'			Attendance: 0 Referee: Ibrahim Nour El Din

14 February 2013	Smouha	1 – 0	Al-Ahly	Borg El Arab Stadium, Alexandria
19:30 UTC+02:00	Papa Arko 66'			Attendance: 0 Referee: Mahmoud Ashour

18 February 2013	Al-Ahly	2 – 0	Telephonat Bani Sweif	30 June Stadium, Cairo
17:00 UTC+02:00	Qinawi 20'; Hamdy 60'			Attendance: 0 Referee: Mohamed Farouk

28 February 2013	Haras El Hodood	3 - 0	Al-Ahly	Borg El Arab Stadium, Alexandria
17:30 UTC+02:00	Mekky 5', 78'; Eno 50'			Attendance: 0 Referee: Gehad Gereisha

10 March 2013	Al-Ahly	2 - 1	Enppi	30 June Stadium, Cairo
20:00 UTC+02:00	Rabia 7'; Zaher 87'		Shahat 69'	Attendance: 0 Referee: Mohamed Farouk

== CAF Champions league ==
=== Group stage ===
Pos	Team	Pld	W	D	L	GF	GA	GD	Pts	Qualification
1	(Egypt) Al-Ahly	6	3	2	1	9	6	+3	11	Advance to knockout stage
2	(Democratic Republic of the Congo) TP Mazembe	6	3	1	2	9	6	+3	10	Advance to knockout stage
3	(Ghana) Berekum Chelsea	6	2	3	1	9	10	−1	9	
4	(Egypt) Zamalek SC	6	0	2	4	5	10	−5	2	

Source: CAF
Rules for classification: Group stage tiebreakers

8 July 2012	Al-Ahly (Egypt)	2 – 1	(Democratic Republic of the Congo) TP Mazembe	Cairo Military Academy Stadium, Cairo
19:30 UTC+02:00	Moteab 12'; Gedo 90+2'	Report	Samata 85'	Attendance: 0 Referee: Noumandiez Doué (Ivory Coast)

22 July 2012	Zamalek (Egypt)	0 – 1	(Egypt) Al-Ahly	Cairo Military Academy Stadium, Cairo
22:00 UTC+02:00		Report	Aboutrika 79'	Attendance: 0 Referee: Sylvester Kirwa (Kenya)

4 August 2012	Al-Ahly (Egypt)	4 – 1	(Ghana) Berekum Chelsea	Cairo Military Academy Stadium, Cairo
22:00 UTC+02:00	Said 17'; Nagieb 33'; Soliman 68', 72'	Report	Clottey 41' (pen.)	Attendance: 0 Referee: Djamel Haimoudi (Algeria)

19 August 2012	Berekum Chelsea (Ghana)	1 – 1	(Egypt) Al-Ahly	Accra Sports Stadium, Accra
14:00 UTC±00:00	Opoku 52'	Report	Anicet 43'	Referee: Bouchaib El Ahrach (Morocco)

2 September 2012	TP Mazembe (Democratic Republic of the Congo)	2 – 0	(Egypt) Al-Ahly	Stade TP Mazembe, Lubumbashi
15:30 UTC+02:00	Samata 49'; Kanda 61'	Report		Referee: Neant Alioum (Cameroon)

16 September 2012	Al-Ahly (Egypt)	1 – 1	(Egypt) Zamalek	Borg El Arab Stadium, Alexandria
17:00 UTC+02:00	Barakat 62'	Report	Ibrahim 42'	Attendance: 0 Referee: Slim Jedidi (Tunisia)

=== Semifinals ===
6 October 2012	Sunshine Stars (Nigeria)	3 – 3	(Egypt) Al-Ahly	Otunba Dipo Dina International Stadium, Ijebu Ode
15:00 UTC+01:00	Temen 38'; Olorundare 73' (pen.); Osasco 84'	Report	Gedo 18', 74'; Hamdy 32'	Referee: Daniel Bennett (South Africa)

21 October 2012	Al-Ahly (Egypt)	1 – 0 (4 – 3 agg.)	(Nigeria) Sunshine Stars	30 June Stadium, Cairo
20:00 UTC+02:00	Gedo 28'	Report		Attendance: 0 Referee: Neant Alioum (Cameroon)

=== Final ===
4 November 2012	Al-Ahly (Egypt)	1–1	(Tunisia) Espérance ST	Borg El Arab Stadium, Alexandria
19:00 UTC+02:00	Hamdy 88'	Report	Hichri 49'	Attendance: 25,000; Referee: Djamel Haimoudi (Algeria)

17 November 2012	Espérance ST (Tunisia)	1 – 2 (2 – 3 agg.)	(Egypt) Al-Ahly	Stade Olympique de Radès, Radès
18:30 UTC+01:00	N'Djeng 85'	Report	Geddo 43'; Soliman 63'	Referee: Bouchaïb El Ahrach (Morocco)

2012 CAF Champions League winners
(Egypt)
Al-Ahly
Seventh title

== FIFA Club World Cup ==
Play-off for quarter-finals
6 December – Yokohama
(Japan) Sanfrecce Hiroshima	1
(New Zealand) Auckland City	0

Quarter-finals
9 December – Toyota
(Japan) Sanfrecce Hiroshima	1
(Egypt) Al Ahly	2
9 December – Toyota
(South Korea) Ulsan Hyundai	1
(Mexico) Monterrey	3

Semi-finals
12 December – Toyota
(Egypt) Al Ahly	0
(Brazil) Corinthians	1
13 December – Yokohama
(Mexico) Monterrey	1
(England) Chelsea	3
Match for fifth place
12 December – Toyota
(South Korea) Ulsan Hyundai	2
(Japan) Sanfrecce Hiroshima	3

Final
16 December – Yokohama
(Brazil) Corinthians	1
(England) Chelsea	0
Match for third place
16 December – Yokohama
(Egypt) Al Ahly	0
(Mexico) Monterrey	2

All times Japan Standard Time (UTC+09:00).

=== Quarter-finals ===
9 December 2012	Sanfrecce Hiroshima (Japan)	1–2	(Egypt) Al-Ahly	Toyota Stadium, Toyota
19:30	Satō 32'	Report	Hamdy 15'; Aboutrika 57'	Attendance: 27,314; Referee: Carlos Vera (Ecuador)

=== Semi-finals ===
12 December 2012	Al-Ahly (Egypt)	0–1	(Brazil) Corinthians	Toyota Stadium, Toyota
19:30		Report	Guerrero 30'	Attendance: 31,417; Referee: Marco Rodríguez (Mexico)

=== Match for third place ===
16 December 2012	Al-Ahly (Egypt)	0–2	(Mexico) Monterrey	International Stadium Yokohama, Yokohama
16:30		Report	Corona 3'; Delgado 66'	Attendance: 56,301; Referee: Peter O'Leary (New Zealand)
