= 2012–13 ASO Chlef season =

ASO Chlef
2013–14 season
- Chairman: Abdelkrim Medouar
- Head coach: Rachid Belhout (until 25 October 2012); Mohamed Benchouia (from 25 October 2012) (until 15 November 2012); Nour Benzekri (from 18 November 2012)
- Stadium: Stade Mohamed Boumezrag
- Ligue 1: 10th
- Algerian Cup: Round of 16
- CAF Champions League: Group stage
- Top goalscorer: League: Mohamed Messaoud (8); All: Mohamed Messaoud (11)

In the 2012–13 season, ASO Chlef is competing in the Ligue 1 for the 26th season, as well as the Algerian Cup. It is their 9th consecutive season in the top flight of Algerian football. They will be competing in Ligue 1, and the Algerian Cup.

== Squad list ==
Players and squad numbers last updated on 18 November 2010.
Note: Flags indicate national team as has been defined under FIFA eligibility rules. Players may hold more than one non-FIFA nationality.

No.	Nat.	Position	Name	Date of birth (age)	Signed from
Goalkeepers
Defenders
Midfielders
Forwards

== Competitions ==
=== Overview ===
Competition	Record								Started round	Final position / round	First match	Last match
Competition	G	W	D	L	GF	GA	GD	Win %	Started round	Final position / round	First match	Last match
Ligue 1	30	10	8	12	26	29	−3	33.33	—N/a	10th	7 September 2012	21 May 2013
Algerian Cup	3	1	1	1	8	4	+4	33.33	Round of 64	Round of 16	15 December 2012	1 March 2013
CAF Champions League	4	1	0	3	4	7	−3	25.00	group stage		7 July 2012	14 September 2012
Total	37	12	9	16	38	40	−2	32.43				

Updated to match played 9 May 2017
Source: Competitions

== League table ==
Pos	Team	Pld	W	D	L	GF	GA	GD	Pts
8	MC El Eulma	30	9	13	8	29	27	+2	40
9	JS Saoura	30	10	8	12	28	26	+2	38
10	ASO Chlef	30	10	8	12	26	29	−3	38
11	JSM Béjaïa	30	9	11	10	28	32	−4	38
12	MC Oran	30	8	10	12	33	41	−8	34

Updated to match(es) played on 21 May 2013. Source: DZFoot
Rules for classification: 1) points; 2) head-to-head points; 3) head-to-head goal difference; 4) goal difference; 5) total goals; 6) fairplay ranking; 7) playoff.

=== Results summary ===
Overall								Home						Away					
Pld	W	D	L	GF	GA	GD	Pts	W	D	L	GF	GA	GD	W	D	L	GF	GA	GD
30	10	8	12	26	29	−3	38	8	3	4	19	10	+9	2	5	8	7	19	−12

Last updated: 29 December 2014.
Source: Competitive matches

=== Results by round ===
Round	1	2	3	4	5	6	7	8	9	10	11	12	13	14	15	16	17	18	19	20	21	22	23	24	25	26	27	28	29	30
Ground	H	A	H	A	H	A	H	A	H	A	H	A	H	H	A	A	H	A	H	A	H	A	H	A	H	A	H	A	A	H
Result	W	L	D	D	L	L	L	D	D	L	W	D	D	W	D	W	L	L	L	L	W	W	W	L	W	L	W	L	D	W
Position																														10

Source: Competitive matches
A = Away; H = Home; W = Win; D = Draw; L = Loss

=== Matches ===
7 September 2012 Round 1	ASO Chlef	2–1	USM Bel-Abbès	Chlef
20:30	Messaoud 8', 90+5'	Report	60' Hamiche	Stadium: Stade Mohamed Boumezrag; Referee: Sofiane Bousseter

18 September 2012 Round 2	CR Belouizdad	1–0	ASO Chlef	Belouizdad
18:00	Aksas 72'	Report		Stadium: Stade 20 Août 1955; Referee: Farouk Mial

22 September 2012 Round 3	ASO Chlef	1–1	CS Constantine	Chlef
18:00	Gharbi 17'	Report	67' Boulemdaïs	Stadium: Stade Mohamed Boumezrag; Referee: Mohamed Ghorbal

29 September 2012 Round 4	MC Alger	0–0	ASO Chlef	Algiers
18:00		Report		Stadium: July 5, 1962 Stadium; Referee: Mehdi Abid Charef

6 October 2012 Round 5	ASO Chlef	0–2	JS Kabylie	Chlef
17:45		Report	50', 58' Bouaïcha	Stadium: Stade Mohamed Boumezrag; Referee: Boubekeur Zouaoui

16 October 2012 Round 6	USM El Harrach	2–0	ASO Chlef	Algiers
16:00	Kerim 25'; El Amali 88'	Report		Stadium: Stade 1er Novembre 1954; Referee: Farouk Houasnia

20 October 2012 Round 7	ASO Chlef	0–1	CA Bordj Bou Arreridj	Chlef
18:00		Report	25' (pen.) Mesfar	Stadium: Stade Mohamed Boumezrag; Referee: Redouane Necib

23 October 2012 Round 8	WA Tlemcen	0–0	ASO Chlef	Tlemcen
16:00		Report		Stadium: Stade Akid Lotfi; Referee: Rafik Achouri

2 November 2012 Round 9	ASO Chlef	1–1	CA Batna	Chlef
17:45	Messaoud 66'	Report	15' El Hadi	Stadium: Stade Mohamed Boumezrag; Referee: Amine Sekhraoui

10 November 2012 Round 10	USM Alger	3–0	ASO Chlef	Algiers
18:00	Feham 1'; Seguer 4'; Gasmi 45' (pen.)	Report		Stadium: Stade Omar Hamadi; Referee: Mohamed Saïdi

17 November 2012 Round 11	ASO Chlef	2–1	ES Sétif	Chlef
17:45	Ghazali 9'; Mellouli 79'	Report	75' Aoudia	Stadium: Stade Mohamed Boumezrag; Referee: Farouk Mial

24 November 2012 Round 12	JS Saoura	1–1	ASO Chlef	Béchar
15:00	Beldjilali 53'	Report	58' (pen.) Messaoud	Stadium: Stade 20 Août 1955; Attendance: 0 (close doors); Referee: Farouk Houasnia

1 December 2012 Round 13	ASO Chlef	0–0	MC El Eulma	Chlef
15:00		Report		Stadium: Stade Mohamed Boumezrag; Referee: Youssef Zerrouki

8 December 2012 Round 14	ASO Chlef	1–0	MC Oran	Chlef
15:00	Nessakh 55'	Report		Stadium: Stade Mohamed Boumezrag; Referee: Boubekeur Zouaoui

22 December 2012 Round 15	JSM Béjaïa	1–1	ASO Chlef	Béjaïa
18:00	Mebarakou 73'	Report	34' Nessakh	Stadium: Stade de l'Unité Maghrébine; Referee: Redouane Necib

15 January 2013 Round 16	USM Bel-Abbès	0–1	ASO Chlef	Sidi Bel Abbès
15:00		Report	15' Djabout	Stadium: Stade 24 Fevrier 1956; Referee: Merzak Halalchi

19 January 2013 Round 17	ASO Chlef	1–2	CR Belouizdad	Chlef
15:00	Nasseri 37'	Report	3' Amroune; 20' Ammour	Stadium: Stade Mohamed Boumezrag; Referee: Mohamed Bachir

26 January 2013 Round 18	CS Constantine	1–0	ASO Chlef	Constantine
15:00	Boulahia 26'	Report		Stadium: Stade Mohamed Hamlaoui; Referee: Mohamed Ghorbal

2 February 2013 Round 19	ASO Chlef	0–1	MC Alger	Chlef
15:00		Report	44' Bouguèche	Stadium: Stade Mohamed Boumezrag; Referee: Farouk Houasnia

9 February 2013 Round 20	JS Kabylie	1–0	ASO Chlef	Tizi Ouzou
15:00	Chalali 50'	Report		Stadium: Stade du 1er Novembre 1954; Referee: Mohamed Saïdi

16 February 2013 Round 21	ASO Chlef	3–0	USM El Harrach	Chlef
18:00	Messaoud 55'; Haddouche 57'; Zaouche 71'	Report		Stadium: Stade Mohamed Boumezrag; Referee: Mehdi Abid Charef

23 February 2013 Round 22	CA Bordj Bou Arreridj	0–1	ASO Chlef	Bordj Bou Arréridj
15:00		Report	71' (pen.) Messaoud	Stadium: Stade 20 Août 1955; Referee: Farouk Mial

9 March 2013 Round 23	ASO Chlef	3–0	WA Tlemcen	Chlef
18:00	Farhi 1', 8'; Messaoud 76'	Report		Stadium: Stade Mohamed Boumezrag; Referee: Rafik Achouri

19 March 2013 Round 24	CA Batna	1–0	ASO Chlef	Batna
17:00	El Hadi 82'	Report		Stadium: November 1, 1954 Stadium; Referee: Abderrazek Hallalchi

16 April 2013 Round 25	ASO Chlef	1–0	USM Alger	Chlef
18:00	Messaoud 90'	Report		Stadium: Stade Mohamed Boumezrag; Referee: Mokhtar Amalou

27 April 2013 Round 26	ES Sétif	4–1	ASO Chlef	Sétif
18:00	Ferrahi 11'; Madouni 39'; Aoudia 63' (pen.); Nadji 90+1'	Report	90+3' Aouamri	Stadium: Stade 8 Mai 1945; Referee: Farouk Mial

4 May 2013 Round 27	ASO Chlef	2–0	JS Saoura	Chlef
17:00	Youcef 25'; Farhi 67'	Report		Stadium: Stade Mohamed Boumezrag; Referee: Merzoug Brahimi

11 May 2013 Round 28	MC El Eulma	2–0	ASO Chlef	El Eulma
18:00	Hamiti 20'; Abbès 65'	Report		Stadium: Stade Messaoud Zougar; Referee: Mohamed Saïdi

18 May 2013 Round 29	MC Oran	2–2	ASO Chlef	Oran
17:00	M.Sebbah 35'; Aouedj 77' (pen.)	Report	55' Ali Hadji; 67' Merzougi	Stadium: Habib Bouakeul Stadium; Referee: Said Aouina

21 May 2013 Round 30	ASO Chlef	2–0	JSM Béjaïa	Chlef
17:00	Ali Hadji 36'; Merzougi 89'	Report		Stadium: Stade Mohamed Boumezrag; Referee: Bouaza Chenane

== Algerian Cup ==
15 December 2012 Round of 64	MB Bouira	0–6	ASO Chlef	Sour El Ghozlane
14:00		Repport	17', 22' Youcef; 45' Ali Hadji; 49' Messaoud; 70', 78' Eyenga	Stadium: Stade Derradji Mohamed; Referee: Khaled Saïdi

28 December 2012 Round of 32	MB Rouissat	2–2 (4–5 p)	ASO Chlef	Ouargla
15:00	Tlili 83'; Tahra 112'	Repport	89', 104' Farhi	Stadium: Stade du 15 Février; Referee: Saïd Aouina
	Penalties
	Penalty scored Penalty missed		Penalty scored Penalty missed

1 March 2013 Round of 16	MC Oran	2–0	ASO Chlef	Oran
16:00	Benyettou 12'; Zidane 67'	Repport		Stadium: Habib Bouakeul Stadium; Referee: Redouane Necib

== CAF Champions League ==
=== Group stage ===
==== Group A ====
Pos	Team	Pld	W	D	L	GF	GA	GD	Pts	Qualification
1	(Tunisia) ES Tunis	4	3	0	1	6	3	+3	9	Advance to knockout stage
2	(Nigeria) Sunshine Stars	4	2	0	2	4	4	0	6	Advance to knockout stage
3	(Algeria) ASO Chlef	4	1	0	3	4	7	−3	3	
4	(Tunisia) Étoile du Sahel	0	0	0	0	0	0	0	0	Disqualified (Note: The match Étoile du Sahel v Espérance ST on Matchday 4 was abandoned due to crowd disturbance. The CAF decided to disqualify Étoile du Sahel as a result and all results obtained previously by Étoile du Sahel within Group A were cancelled.)

Source: CAF
Rules for classification: Group stage tiebreakers
Notes:

7 July 2012	ASO Chlef (Algeria)	0–1; Annulled	(Tunisia) Étoile du Sahel	Chlef
21:00 UTC+01:00		Report	Belaïd 9'	Stadium: Stade Mohamed Boumezrag; Referee: Koman Coulibaly (Mali)

20 July 2012	Espérance ST (Tunisia)	3–2	(Algeria) ASO Chlef	Radès
22:00 UTC+01:00	Mouelhi 29' (pen.), 87' (pen.); N'Djeng 90+3'	Report	Mellouli 42'; Messaoud 85'	Stadium: Stade Olympique de Radès; Referee: Bouchaib El Ahrach (Morocco)

5 August 2012	Sunshine Stars (Nigeria)	2–0	(Algeria) ASO Chlef	Ijebu Ode
15:00 UTC+01:00	Olorundare 48'; Azuka 59'	Report		Stadium: Otunba Dipo Dina International Stadium; Referee: Hamada Nampiandraza (Madagascar)

17 August 2012	ASO Chlef (Algeria)	1–2	(Nigeria) Sunshine Stars	Chlef
22:00 UTC+01:00	Eyenga 48'	Report	Tamen 45+2'; Ukeyima 76'	Stadium: Stade Mohamed Boumezrag; Referee: Aboubacar Bangoura (Guinea)

Étoile du Sahel (Tunisia)	Cancelled	(Algeria) ASO Chlef	Sousse
			Stadium: Stade Olympique de Sousse

14 September 2012	ASO Chlef (Algeria)	1–0	(Tunisia) Espérance ST	Chlef
20:30 UTC+01:00	Eyenga 26'	Report		Stadium: Stade Mohamed Boumezrag; Referee: Eric Otogo-Castane (Gabon)

== Squad information ==
=== Playing statistics ===
No.	Pos	Nat	Player	Total		Ligue 1		Algerian Cup		Champions League	
No.	Pos	Nat	Player	Apps	Goals	Apps	Goals	Apps	Goals	Apps	Goals
Goalkeepers
1	GK	(Algeria) ALG	Mohamed Ghalem	32	0	27	0	1	0	4	0
12	GK	(Algeria) ALG	Ammar Hamzaoui	5	0	3	0	2	0	0	0
Defenders
30	DF	(Algeria) ALG	Samir Zaoui	26	0	21	0	1	0	4	0
13	DF	(Algeria) ALG	Farid Mellouli	23	2	20	1	1	0	2	1
5	DF	(Algeria) ALG	Samir Zazou	31	0	25	0	2	0	4	0
4	DF	(Algeria) ALG	Mohamed Amine Aouamri	31	1	26	1	3	0	2	0
3	DF	(Algeria) ALG	Toufik Bouhafer	19	0	15	0	1	0	3	0
25	DF	(Algeria) ALG	Maâmar Youcef	19	3	14	1	3	2	2	0
18	DF	(Algeria) ALG	Lyès Saïdi	5	0	3	0	2	0	0	0
6	DF	(Algeria) ALG	Mohamed Amine Saïdoune	13	0	10	0	2	0	1	0
24	DF	(Algeria) ALG	Chemseddine Nessakh	17	2	13	2	1	0	3	0
	DF	(Algeria) ALG	Réda Rabhi	4	0	4	0	0	0	0	0
	DF	(Algeria) ALG	Tadjeddine Chadouli	1	0	1	0	0	0	0	0
	DF	(Algeria) ALG	Nour El Islam Salah	3	0	3	0	0	0	0	0
	DF	(Algeria) ALG	Tawfiq Sabbih	1	0	1	0	0	0	0	0
Midfielders
26	MF	(Algeria) ALG	Sabri Gharbi	28	1	24	1	1	0	3	0
22	MF	(Algeria) ALG	Kheireddine Selama	24	0	20	0	2	0	2	0
10	MF	(Algeria) ALG	Mohamed Messaoud	26	10	23	8	2	1	1	1
14	MF	(Algeria) ALG	Mohamed Zaouche	31	1	24	1	3	0	4	0
20	MF	(Algeria) ALG	Mamaar Bentoucha	29	0	24	0	2	0	3	0
23	MF	(Algeria) ALG	Charif Nasseri	13	1	11	1	2	0	0	0
16	MF	(Algeria) ALG	Zakaria Haddouche	22	1	17	1	2	0	3	0
15	MF	(Algeria) ALG	Ayoub Farhi	15	5	13	3	2	2	0	0
37	MF	(Algeria) ALG	Djelloul Djouba	1	0	1	0	0	0	0	0
	MF	(Algeria) ALG	Abdelkader Boussaid	1	0	1	0	0	0	0	0
	MF	(Cameroon) CMR	Patrick Kamgaing	3	0	0	0	0	0	3	0
Forwards
31	FW	(Algeria) ALG	Karim Ali Hadji	30	3	25	2	1	1	4	0
29	FW	(Algeria) ALG	Mohamed Amroune	10	0	5	0	1	0	4	0
	FW	(Algeria) ALG	Youcef Ghazali	12	1	12	1	0	0	0	0
9	FW	(Cameroon) CMR	Anicet Eyenga	20	2	14	0	2	2	4	0
	FW	(Mauritania) MTN	El Mamy Traoré	6	0	6	0	0	0	0	0
	FW	(Algeria) ALG	Kheiredine Merzougi	4	2	4	2	0	0	0	0
	FW	(Algeria) ALG	Adil Djabout	6	1	4	1	2	0	0	0
	FW	(Algeria) ALG	Ismail Belkacemi	3	0	3	0	0	0	0	0
Players transferred out during the season

Last updated: 17 November 2017
Source: fr.soccerway.com

== Transfers ==
=== In ===
Date	Pos	Player	From club	Transfer fee	Source
1 July 2012	GK	(Algeria) Ammar Hamzaoui	Reserve team	First Professional Contract	
1 July 2012	DF	(Algeria) Réda Rabhi	Reserve team	First Professional Contract	
1 July 2012	DF	(Algeria) Chemseddine Nessakh	JS Kabylie	Undisclosed	
1 July 2012	FW	(Algeria) Youcef Ghazali	ES Sétif	Undisclosed	
1 July 2012	FW	(Cameroon) Anicet Eyenga	(Malta) Sliema Wanderers	Undisclosed	
1 July 2012	FW	(Algeria) Mohamed Amroune	MC Alger	Undisclosed	
1 August 2012	DF	(Algeria) Lyès Saïdi	JSM Béjaïa	Undisclosed	
1 January 2013	MF	(Algeria) Ayoub Farhi	Reserve team	First Professional Contract	
10 January 2013	FW	(Mauritania) El Mamy Traoré	(Mauritania) FC Nouadhibou	Undisclosed	
