= 2012 CAF Champions League qualifying rounds =

- Dates: 17 February – 4 March 2012

The 2012 CAF Champions League qualifying rounds decided the eight teams which played in the group stage.

The schedule for the tournament was released in October 2011, and the draw for all three rounds was held in Cairo on 9 December 2011.

Qualification ties were decided over two legs, with aggregate goals used to determine the winner. If the sides were level on aggregate after the second leg, the away goals rule was applied, and if still level, the tie proceeded directly to a penalty shootout (no extra time was played).

== Preliminary round ==
This was a knock-out stage of the 38 teams that did not receive byes to the first round.

First legs: 17–19 February; Second legs: 2–4 March.

18 February 2012
16:00 UTC±00:00

ASFA Yennenga (Burkina Faso)	0–0	(Algeria) ASO Chlef
	Report

Stade du 4-Août, Ouagadougou
Referee: Abdoul-Aziz Hama (Niger)
2 March 2012
18:00 UTC+01:00

ASO Chlef (Algeria)	4–1	(Burkina Faso) ASFA Yennenga
Seguer 4', 90', 90+4'; Haddouche 73'	Report	Ouattara 45'

Stade Mohamed Boumezrag, Chlef
Referee: Med Said Kordi (Tunisia)

ASO Chlef won 4–1 on aggregate and advanced to the first round.

10 March 2012
15:30 UTC+01:00

AS Vita Club (Democratic Republic of the Congo)	5–0	(Burundi) Athlético Olympic
Etekiama 19'; Rongombe 41'; Magola 44', 78'; Ndeyisene 66' (o.g.)	Report

Stade des Martyrs, Kinshasa
Referee: Yves Roponat Mbourou (Gabon)
18 March 2012
15:00 UTC+02:00

Athlético Olympic (Burundi)	4–1	(Democratic Republic of the Congo) AS Vita Club
Ndayishimiye 13', 62'; Kwizera 36'; Mbazumutima 64'	Report	Etekiama 35'

Prince Louis Rwagasore Stadium, Bujumbura
Referee: Sylvester Kirwa (Kenya)

Note: Both legs postponed per agreement between AS Vita Club and Athlético Olympic.

AS Vita Club won 6–4 on aggregate and advanced to the first round.

19 February 2012
15:00 UTC+01:00

DFC 8ème Arrondissement (Central African Republic)	1–0	(Cameroon) Les Astres
Bimale 68'	Report

Barthelemy Boganda Stadium, Bangui
Referee: Serge Flavien Soumou (Congo)
4 March 2012
15:00 UTC+01:00

Les Astres (Cameroon)	2–1	(Central African Republic) DFC 8ème Arrondissement
Kabong 16'; Taoga 46'	Report	Limane 44'

Stade de la Réunification, Douala
Referee: Henry Ogunyamodi (Nigeria)

2–2 on aggregate. DFC 8ème Arrondissement won on the away goals rule and advanced to the first round.

18 February 2012
16:00 UTC+03:00

Young Africans (Tanzania)	1–1	(Egypt) Zamalek
Kiiza 36'	Report	Zaki 74'

Benjamin Mkapa National Stadium, Dar es Salaam
Referee: Bamlak Tessema Weyesa (Ethiopia)
3 March 2012
18:00 UTC+02:00

Zamalek (Egypt)	1–0	(Tanzania) Young Africans
Mido 31'	Report

Cairo Military Academy Stadium, Cairo
Referee: Rédouane Jiyed (Morocco)

Zamalek won 2–1 on aggregate and advanced to the first round.

19 February 2012
15:30 UTC+01:00

Missile (Gabon)	3–2	(Ivory Coast) Africa Sports
Gossé 3', 34' (pen.); Mintsa 35'	Report	Iani 2'; Konaté 21'

Stade de Franceville, Franceville
Referee: Fuengi Claude Ntuntu (DR Congo)
4 March 2012
15:30 UTC±00:00

Africa Sports (Ivory Coast)	2–0	(Gabon) Missile
Kouakou 24'; Konaté 79'	Report

Stade Félix Houphouët-Boigny, Abidjan
Referee: Mokhtar Amalou (Algeria)

Africa Sports won 4–3 on aggregate and advanced to the first round.

18 February 2012
16:00 UTC±00:00

Ports Authority (Sierra Leone)	0–0	(Guinea) Horoya AC
	Report

National Stadium, Freetown
Referee: Bakary Camara (Gambia)
4 March 2012
16:00 UTC±00:00

Horoya AC (Guinea)	1–0	(Sierra Leone) Ports Authority
A. Sylla 70'	Report

Stade du 28 Septembre, Conakry
Referee: Daouda Gueye (Senegal)

Horoya AC won 1–0 on aggregate and advanced to the first round.

18 February 2012
15:00 UTC+01:00

Foullah Edifice (Chad)	0–0	(Algeria) JSM Béjaïa
	Report

Stade Omnisports Idriss Mahamat Ouya, N'Djamena
Referee: Aurélien Juenkou Wandji (Cameroon)
2 March 2012
16:00 UTC+01:00

JSM Béjaïa (Algeria)	3–1	(Chad) Foullah Edifice
Yélémou 22', 68'; Boulaïnceur 35'	Report	Aboubakar 80'

Stade de l'Unité Maghrébine, Béjaïa
Referee: Mohamed Farouk Mahmoud (Egypt)

JSM Béjaïa won 3–1 on aggregate and advanced to the first round.

19 February 2012
15:30 UTC±00:00

AFAD Djékanou (Ivory Coast)	1–0	(Republic of the Congo) Diables Noirs
Allègne 72'	Report

Stade Robert Champroux, Abidjan
Referee: Reginald Lathbridge (Ghana)
6 March 2012
15:30 UTC+01:00

Diables Noirs (Republic of the Congo)	0–1	(Ivory Coast) AFAD Djékanou
	Report	Moukoro 90+2'

Stade Alphonse Massemba-Débat, Brazzaville
Referee: Prince Arcy Dongombe (Central African Republic)

Note: Second leg postponed due to explosions in Brazzaville.

AFAD Djékanou won 2–0 on aggregate and advanced to the first round.

18 February 2012
16:00 UTC+03:00

Tusker (Kenya)	0–0	(Rwanda) APR
	Report

Nyayo National Stadium, Nairobi
Referee: Denis Batte (Uganda)
4 March 2012
15:30 UTC+02:00

APR (Rwanda)	1–0	(Kenya) Tusker
Papy 52'	Report

Stade Régional Nyamirambo, Kigali
Referee: Israel Mujuni (Tanzania)

APR won 1–0 on aggregate and advanced to the first round.

18 February 2012
16:00 UTC+03:00

Coin Nord (Comoros)	1–0	(Ethiopia) Ethiopian Coffee
Mohamed 30'	Report

Stade Said Mohamed Cheikh, Mitsamiouli
Referee: Abdoul Ohabee Kanoso (Madagascar)
4 March 2012
16:00 UTC+03:00

Ethiopian Coffee (Ethiopia)	4–1	(Comoros) Coin Nord
Tadesse 28', 88'; Deribe 75'; Tesfaye 80'	Report	Issa 44'

Addis Ababa Stadium, Addis Ababa

Ethiopian Coffee won 4–2 on aggregate and advanced to the first round.

18 February 2012
15:30 UTC+01:00

ASGNN (Niger)	0–0	(Benin) Tonnerre
	Report

Stade Général Seyni Kountché, Niamey
Referee: Denis Dembele (Ivory Coast)
4 March 2012
16:00 UTC+01:00

Tonnerre (Benin)	1–0	(Niger) ASGNN
Aoudou 41'	Report

Stade de l'Amitié, Cotonou
Referee: Oumar Mahamat Tahir (Chad)

Tonnerre won 1–0 on aggregate and advanced to the first round.

19 February 2012
15:00 UTC+02:00

Orlando Pirates (South Africa)	1–3	(Angola) Recreativo do Libolo
Mahamutsa 90+2'	Report	Rasca 12', 17'; Camará 63'

Nelson Mandela Bay Stadium, Port Elizabeth
Referee: Dennis Nguluwe (Malawi)
3 March 2012
15:00 UTC+01:00

Recreativo do Libolo (Angola)	1–1	(South Africa) Orlando Pirates
Rasca 34'	Report	Jali 45'

Estádio Patrice Lumumba, Calulo
Referee: Samuel Chirindza (Mozambique)

Recreativo do Libolo won 4–2 on aggregate and advanced to the first round.

18 February 2012
16:00 UTC+03:00

URA (Uganda)	3–0	Lesotho Correctional Services
Kaweesa 12'; Bagala 55'; Nsumba 60'	Report

National Stadium, Kampala
Referee: Gervais Munyanziza (Rwanda)
4 March 2012
15:00 UTC+02:00

Lesotho Correctional Services	0–0	(Uganda) URA
	Report

Setsoto Stadium, Maseru
Referee: Tinyiko Hlungwani (South Africa)

URA won 3–0 on aggregate and advanced to the first round.

19 February 2012
21:30 UTC+03:00

Mafunzo (Zanzibar)	0–2	(Mozambique) Liga Muçulmana
	Report	Muandro 8', 14'

Amaan Stadium, Zanzibar City
Referee: Bernard Camille (Seychelles)
10 March 2012
15:00 UTC+02:00

Liga Muçulmana (Mozambique)	3–0	(Zanzibar) Mafunzo
Telinho 1', 37'; Reginaldo 62'	Report

Estádio Da Liga Muçulmana, Matola
Referee: Wellington Kaoma (Zambia)

Note: Second leg postponed per request from Liga Muçulmana.

Liga Muçulmana won 5–0 on aggregate and advanced to the first round.

18 February 2012
16:30 UTC±00:00

Brikama United (The Gambia)	0–1	(Senegal) US Ouakam
	Report	Diallo 60'

Box Bar Mini Stadium, Brikama
Referee: Jerry Yekeh (Liberia)
3 March 2012
17:00 UTC±00:00

US Ouakam (Senegal)	0–1	(The Gambia) Brikama United
	Report	Trawally 70'
Penalties
	1–3

Stade Demba Diop, Dakar
Referee: Alain Ouédraogo (Burkina Faso)

1–1 on aggregate. Brikama United won the penalty shootout and advanced to the first round.

19 February 2012
17:00 UTC+01:00

Sony Elá Nguema (Equatorial Guinea)	0–3	(Nigeria) Dolphins
	Report	Nwachi 16'; Osuchukwu 26'; Egwim 50'

Estadio de Malabo, Malabo
4 March 2012
16:00 UTC+01:00

Dolphins (Nigeria)	3–0	(Equatorial Guinea) Sony Elá Nguema
Olawale 2'; Egwim 20'; Osuchukwu 72'	Report

Liberation Stadium, Port Harcourt

Dolphins won 6–0 on aggregate and advanced to the first round.

19 February 2012
16:00 UTC±00:00

LISCR (Liberia)	0–2	(Ghana) Berekum Chelsea
	Report	Agyeman 57'; Arko 79'

Antoinette Tubman Stadium, Monrovia
Referee: Hicham Tiazi (Morocco)
4 March 2012
15:00 UTC±00:00

Berekum Chelsea (Ghana)	3–0	(Liberia) LISCR
Opoku 44'; Clottey 66', 70'	Report

Golden City Park, Berekum
Referee: Mahamadou Keita (Mali)

Berekum Chelsea won 5–0 on aggregate and advanced to the first round.

19 February 2012
15:00 UTC+02:00

Green Mamba (Eswatini)	2–4	(Zimbabwe) FC Platinum
Maseko 60'; Mdluli 89'	Report	Ngoma 9', 27'; Gahadzikwa 29'; Ali 84'

Somhlolo National Stadium, Lobamba
Referee: Rainhold Shikongo (Namibia)
3 March 2012
15:00 UTC+02:00

FC Platinum (Zimbabwe)	4–0	(Eswatini) Green Mamba
Ngodzo 7'; Sibanda 29', 45'; Gahadzikwa 37'	Report

Mandava Stadium, Zvishavane
Referee: Romualdo Do Rasario Baltazar (Angola)

FC Platinum won 8–2 on aggregate and advanced to the first round.

19 February 2012
15:00 UTC+03:00

Japan Actuel's (Madagascar)	1–5	(Zambia) Power Dynamos
Rakotondrabe 75'	Report	Mukuka 9', 62'; Bwalya 68'; Nyaende 74', 87'

Mahamasina Municipal Stadium, Antananarivo
Referee: Ganesh Chutooree (Mauritius)
4 March 2012
16:00 UTC+02:00

Power Dynamos (Zambia)	3–0	(Madagascar) Japan Actuel's
Simwala 11'; Mudenda 20'; Nyaende 30'	Report

Arthur Davies Stadium, Kitwe
Referee: Ali Mohamed Adelaid (Comoros)

Power Dynamos won 8–1 on aggregate and advanced to the first round.

== First round ==
This was a knock-out stage of 32 teams; the 19 teams advancing from the preliminary round, and 13 teams that received byes into this round.

First legs: 23–25 March; Second legs: 6–8 April.

23 March 2012
19:00 UTC+01:00

ASO Chlef (Algeria)	0–0	(Democratic Republic of the Congo) AS Vita Club
	Report

Stade Mohamed Boumezrag, Chlef
Referee: Mohamed Farouk Mahmoud (Egypt)
8 April 2012
15:30 UTC+01:00

AS Vita Club (Democratic Republic of the Congo)	2–3	(Algeria) ASO Chlef
Magola 54' (pen.); Ngudikama 90+4'	Report	Ali Hadji 1', 44'; Achiou 85'

Stade des Martyrs, Kinshasa
Referee: Mal Souley Mohamadou (Cameroon)

ASO Chlef won 3–2 on aggregate and advanced to the second round.

24 March 2012
15:00 UTC+01:00

DFC 8ème Arrondissement (Central African Republic)	0–3	(Sudan) Al-Hilal
	Report	Karika 15'; Sadomba 54'; Almadina 68'

Barthelemy Boganda Stadium, Bangui
Referee: Bunmi Ogunkolade (Nigeria)
6 April 2012
20:00 UTC+03:00

Al-Hilal (Sudan)	5–1	(Central African Republic) DFC 8ème Arrondissement
Karika 18', 40'; Sadomba 48', 65' (pen.); Mesawi 67'	Report	Bakhit 90' (o.g.)

Al-Hilal Stadium, Omdurman
Referee: Bouchaib El Ahrach (Morocco)

Al-Hilal won 8–1 on aggregate and advanced to the second round.

25 March 2012
18:00 UTC+02:00

Zamalek (Egypt)	1–0	(Ivory Coast) Africa Sports
Omotoyossi 2'	Report

Cairo Military Academy Stadium, Cairo
Referee: Neant Alioum (Cameroon)
8 April 2012
15:30 UTC±00:00

Africa Sports (Ivory Coast)	2–1	(Egypt) Zamalek
Belem 57'; Olié 68'	Report	Zaki 82'

Stade Félix Houphouët-Boigny, Abidjan
Referee: Ousmane Fall (Senegal)

2–2 on aggregate. Zamalek won on the away goals rule and advanced to the second round.

25 March 2012
16:30 UTC±00:00

Horoya AC (Guinea)	1–1	(Morocco) Maghreb de Fès
I. Sylla 36'	Report	Hajji 2'

Stade du 28 Septembre, Conakry
Referee: Med Said Kordi (Tunisia)
8 April 2012
18:00 UTC±00:00

Maghreb de Fès (Morocco)	3–0	(Guinea) Horoya AC
Abourazzouk 24', 71'; Halhoul 29'	Report

Fez Stadium, Fes
Referee: Djamel Haimoudi (Algeria)

Maghreb de Fès won 4–1 on aggregate and advanced to the second round.

23 March 2012
16:00 UTC+01:00

JSM Béjaïa (Algeria)	1–2	(Ivory Coast) AFAD Djékanou
Gasmi 55'	Report	Kadjo 5'; Allègne 43'

Stade de l'Unité Maghrébine, Béjaïa
Referee: Bakary Papa Gassama (Gambia)
7 April 2012
15:30 UTC±00:00

AFAD Djékanou (Ivory Coast)	3–0	(Algeria) JSM Béjaïa
Amoro 15' (pen.), 60'; Ahmed 75'	Report

Stade Robert Champroux, Abidjan
Referee: Eric Otogo Castane (Gabon)

AFAD Djékanou won 5–1 on aggregate and advanced to the second round.

24 March 2012
15:30 UTC+02:00

APR (Rwanda)	0–0	(Tunisia) Étoile du Sahel
	Report

Stade Régional Nyamirambo, Kigali
Referee: Aboubacar Bangoura (Guinea)
6 April 2012
16:00 UTC+01:00

Étoile du Sahel (Tunisia)	3–2	(Rwanda) APR
Jaziri 9', 90+8'; Namouchi 89'	Report	Wagaluka 39'; Faty 81'

Stade Olympique de Sousse, Sousse
Referee: William Agbovi (Ghana)

Étoile du Sahel won 3–2 on aggregate and advanced to the second round.

25 March 2012
16:00 UTC+03:00

Ethiopian Coffee (Ethiopia)	0–0	(Egypt) Al-Ahly
	Report

Addis Ababa Stadium, Addis Ababa
Referee: Ali Kalyango (Uganda)
8 April 2012
19:00 UTC+02:00

Al-Ahly (Egypt)	3–0	(Ethiopia) Ethiopian Coffee
Fábio Júnior 8'; Aboutrika 61' (pen.), 77'	Report

Cairo Military Academy Stadium, Cairo
Referee: Slim Jedidi (Tunisia)

Al-Ahly won 3–0 on aggregate and advanced to the second round.

1 April 2012
15:00 UTC+01:00

Tonnerre (Benin)	0–0	(Mali) Stade Malien
	Report

Stade René Pleven d'Akpakpa, Cotonou
Referee: Reginald Lathbridge (Ghana)
14 April 2012
17:00 UTC±00:00

Stade Malien (Mali)	5–2	(Benin) Tonnerre
Kida 10', 34'; Koumaré 26'; M. Coulibaly 77' (pen.); Cissoko 85'	Report	Kiki 24'; Aoudou 51'

Stade 26 mars, Bamako
Referee: Mehdi Abid-Charef (Algeria)

Note: First leg postponed due to closure of airport in Bamako after the Malian crisis preventing Stade Malien to travel. Second leg also postponed per request from Tonnerre.

Stade Malien won 5–2 on aggregate and advanced to the second round.

25 March 2012
15:00 UTC+01:00

Recreativo do Libolo (Angola)	4–1	(Nigeria) Sunshine Stars
Rasca 33'; Adawá 79'; Dário 81'; Chico Caputo 90'		Azuka 59'

Estádio Patrice Lumumba, Calulo
Referee: Daniel Bennett (South Africa)
8 April 2012
15:00 UTC+01:00

Sunshine Stars (Nigeria)	3–0	(Angola) Recreativo do Libolo
Azuka 20'; Oboabona 30' (pen.); Olorundare 80'

Otunba Dipo Dina International Stadium, Ijebu Ode
Referee: Janny Sikazwe (Zambia)

4–4 on aggregate. Sunshine Stars won on the away goals rule and advanced to the second round.

24 March 2012
16:00 UTC+03:00

URA (Uganda)	0–2	(Mali) Djoliba
	Report	Bagayoko 16'; Sidibé 25'

National Stadium, Kampala
Referee: Ruzive Ruzive (Zimbabwe)

Djoliba (Mali)	w/o	(Uganda) URA

Djoliba advanced to the second round after being awarded the tie by CAF, as URA did not travel to Mali for the second leg due to the Malian crisis.

24 March 2012
15:00 UTC+02:00

Liga Muçulmana (Mozambique)	2–2	(Zimbabwe) Dynamos
Telinho 45'; Muandro 80'	Report	Chinyama 21', 52'

Estádio Da Liga Muçulmana, Matola
Referee: Rainhold Shikongo (Namibia)
8 April 2012
15:00 UTC+02:00

Dynamos (Zimbabwe)	1–0	(Mozambique) Liga Muçulmana
Chinyama 17'	Report

Rufaro Stadium, Harare
Referee: Tinyiko Hlungwani (South Africa)

Dynamos won 3–2 on aggregate and advanced to the second round.

24 March 2012
16:30 UTC±00:00

Brikama United (The Gambia)	1–1	(Tunisia) Espérance ST
Bojang 12'	Report	Bouazzi 4'

Box Bar Mini Stadium, Brikama
Referee: Ali Lemghaifry (Mauritania)
6 April 2012
16:00 UTC+01:00

Espérance ST (Tunisia)	3–1	(The Gambia) Brikama United
Bouazzi 40'; Y. Msakni 45'; Aouadhi 72'	Report	Sawo 25'

Stade Olympique de Radès, Tunis
Referee: Denis Dembele (Ivory Coast)

Espérance ST won 4–2 on aggregate and advanced to the second round.

25 March 2012
15:00 UTC+01:00

Dolphins (Nigeria)	2–1	(Cameroon) Coton Sport
Egwim 2'; Addai 87'	Report	Haman 19'

Liberation Stadium, Port Harcourt
Referee: Badara Diatta (Senegal)
8 April 2012
15:30 UTC+01:00

Coton Sport (Cameroon)	1–0	(Nigeria) Dolphins
Haman 21'	Report

Roumdé Adjia Stadium, Garoua
Referee: Mohamed Benouza (Algeria)

2–2 on aggregate. Coton Sport won on the away goals rule and advanced to the second round.

25 March 2012
14:00 UTC±00:00

Berekum Chelsea (Ghana)	5–0	(Morocco) Raja Casablanca
Asante 34'; Clottey 53', 62' (pen.), 88'; Mohammed 66'	Report

Golden City Park, Berekum
Referee: Denis Dembele (Ivory Coast)
8 April 2012
20:00 UTC±00:00

Raja Casablanca (Morocco)	3–0	(Ghana) Berekum Chelsea
Oulhaj 50'; Tair 70'; Salhi 90+2'	Report

Stade Mohamed V, Casablanca
Referee: Khalid Abdel Rahman (Sudan)

Berekum Chelsea won 5–3 on aggregate and advanced to the second round.

24 March 2012
15:00 UTC+02:00

FC Platinum (Zimbabwe)	2–2	(Sudan) Al-Merreikh
Katsvairo 31'; Ngodzo 51'	Report	Mustafa 36'; Mutyaba 80'

Rufaro Stadium, Harare
Referee: Rajindraparsad Seechurn (Mauritius)
7 April 2012
20:00 UTC+03:00

Al-Merreikh (Sudan)	3–0	(Zimbabwe) FC Platinum
Osunwa 11', 43'; Sakuwaha 19' (pen.)	Report

Al-Merreikh Stadium, Omdurman
Referee: Ghead Grisha (Egypt)

Al-Merreikh won 5–2 on aggregate and advanced to the second round.

24 March 2012
15:00 UTC+02:00

Power Dynamos (Zambia)	1–1	(Democratic Republic of the Congo) TP Mazembe
Kamuzati 80'	Report	Samata 16'

Arthur Davies Stadium, Kitwe
Referee: Hamada Nampiandraza (Madagascar)
8 April 2012
15:30 UTC+02:00

TP Mazembe (Democratic Republic of the Congo)	6–0	(Zambia) Power Dynamos
Kalaba 9'; Mputu 21', 66' (pen.), 72'; Singuluma 42', 44'	Report

Stade Frederic Kibassa Maliba, Lubumbashi
Referee: Sylvester Kirwa (Kenya)

TP Mazembe won 7–1 on aggregate and advanced to the second round.

== Second round ==
This was a knock-out stage of the 16 teams that advance from the first round; winners advanced to the group stage, while the losers advanced to the Confederation Cup play-off round.

First legs: 27–29 April; Second legs 11–14 May.

29 April 2012
20:00 UTC+03:00

Al-Hilal (Sudan)	1–1	(Algeria) ASO Chlef
Karika 10'	Report	Ali Hadji 56'

Al-Hilal Stadium, Omdurman
Referee: Neant Alioum (Cameroon)
12 May 2012
20:00 UTC+01:00

ASO Chlef (Algeria)	1–1	(Sudan) Al-Hilal
Ali Hadji 81'	Report	Yousif 33'
Penalties
Zaoui (penalty scored); Ali Hadji (penalty missed); Messaoud (penalty scored); Achiou (penalty scored); Bouhafer (penalty scored)	4–2	El Tahir (penalty missed); Sadomba (penalty scored); Fedil (penalty missed); Tahir (penalty scored)

Stade Mohamed Boumezrag, Chlef
Referee: Badara Diatta (Senegal)

2–2 on aggregate. ASO Chlef won the penalty shootout and advanced to the group stage. Al-Hilal advanced to the Confederation Cup play-off round.

28 April 2012
17:00 UTC±00:00

Maghreb de Fès (Morocco)	0–2	(Egypt) Zamalek
	Report	Hassan 78'; Gaafar 89'

Fez Stadium, Fes
Referee: Noumandiez Doué (Ivory Coast)
13 May 2012
19:30 UTC+02:00

Zamalek (Egypt)	2–0	(Morocco) Maghreb de Fès
Salah 2'; Emam 48'	Report

Cairo Military Academy Stadium, Cairo
Referee: Janny Sikazwe (Zambia)

Zamalek won 4–0 on aggregate and advanced to the group stage. Maghreb de Fes advanced to the Confederation Cup play-off round.

28 April 2012
16:00 UTC+01:00

Étoile du Sahel (Tunisia)	4–1	(Ivory Coast) AFAD Djékanou
Chehoudi 29'; Jaziri 55' (pen.); Sassi 85'; Bejaoui 90'	Report	Yannick 61'

Stade Olympique de Sousse, Sousse
Referee: Ghead Grisha (Egypt)
12 May 2012
15:30 UTC±00:00

AFAD Djékanou (Ivory Coast)	1–0	(Tunisia) Étoile du Sahel
Kouadio 59'

Stade Robert Champroux, Abidjan
Referee: Sylvester Kirwa (Kenya)

Étoile du Sahel won 4–2 on aggregate and advanced to the group stage. AFAD Djékanou advanced to the Confederation Cup play-off round.

29 April 2012
16:30 UTC±00:00

Stade Malien (Mali)	1–0	(Egypt) Al-Ahly
Diawara 89'	Report

Stade Modibo Kéïta, Bamako
Referee: Bakary Papa Gassama (Gambia)
14 May 2012
19:30 UTC+02:00

Al-Ahly (Egypt)	3–1	(Mali) Stade Malien
Aboutrika 54', 82' (pen.), 88'	Report	Kida 17'

Cairo Military Academy Stadium, Cairo
Referee: Bouchaib El Ahrach (Morocco)

Al-Ahly won 3–2 on aggregate and advanced to the group stage. Stade Malien advanced to the Confederation Cup play-off round.

28 April 2012
17:00 UTC±00:00

Djoliba (Mali)	1–1	(Nigeria) Sunshine Stars
Sidibé 71'	Report	Azuka 1'

Stade Modibo Kéïta, Bamako
Referee: Mohamed Benouza (Algeria)
13 May 2012
16:00 UTC+01:00

Sunshine Stars (Nigeria)	1–0	(Mali) Djoliba
Azuka 40'	Report

Otunba Dipo Dina International Stadium, Ijebu Ode
Referee: Slim Jedidi (Tunisia)

Sunshine Stars won 2–1 on aggregate and advanced to the group stage. Djoliba advanced to the Confederation Cup play-off round.

28 April 2012
16:00 UTC+01:00

Espérance ST (Tunisia)	6–0	(Zimbabwe) Dynamos
Hichri 8'; Aouadhi 14'; Y. Msakni 38', 90+3'; N'Djeng 77'; I. Msakni 84'	Report

Stade Olympique de Radès, Tunis
Referee: Yakhouba Keita (Guinea)
13 May 2012
15:00 UTC+02:00

Dynamos (Zimbabwe)	1–1	(Tunisia) Espérance ST
Mukamba 83'	Report	Ayari 48'

Rufaro Stadium, Harare
Referee: Khalid Abdel Rahman (Sudan)

Esperance ST won 7–1 on aggregate and advanced to the group stage. Dynamos advanced to the Confederation Cup play-off round.

29 April 2012
15:00 UTC±00:00

Berekum Chelsea (Ghana)	0–0	(Cameroon) Coton Sport
	Report

Golden City Park, Berekum
Referee: Ali Lemghaifry (Mauritania)
13 May 2012
15:00 UTC+01:00

Coton Sport (Cameroon)	1–2	(Ghana) Berekum Chelsea
Haman 83' (pen.)	Report	Basit 30'; Clottey 90'

Roumdé Adjia Stadium, Garoua
Referee: Hamada Nampiandraza (Madagascar)

Berekum Chelsea won 2–1 on aggregate and advanced to the group stage. Coton Sport advanced to the Confederation Cup play-off round.

29 April 2012
15:30 UTC+02:00

TP Mazembe (Democratic Republic of the Congo)	2–0	(Sudan) Al-Merreikh
Samata 22'; Mputu 70'	Report

Stade Frederic Kibassa Maliba, Lubumbashi
Referee: Bouchaib El Ahrach (Morocco)
12 May 2012
20:00 UTC+03:00

Al-Merreikh (Sudan)	1–1	(Democratic Republic of the Congo) TP Mazembe
Osunwa 75'	Report	Sinkala 56'

Al-Merreikh Stadium, Omdurman
Referee: Ali Kalyango (Uganda)

TP Mazembe won on 3–1 aggregate and advanced to the group stage. Al-Merreikh advanced to the Confederation Cup play-off round.
