= 2012 CAF Champions League final =

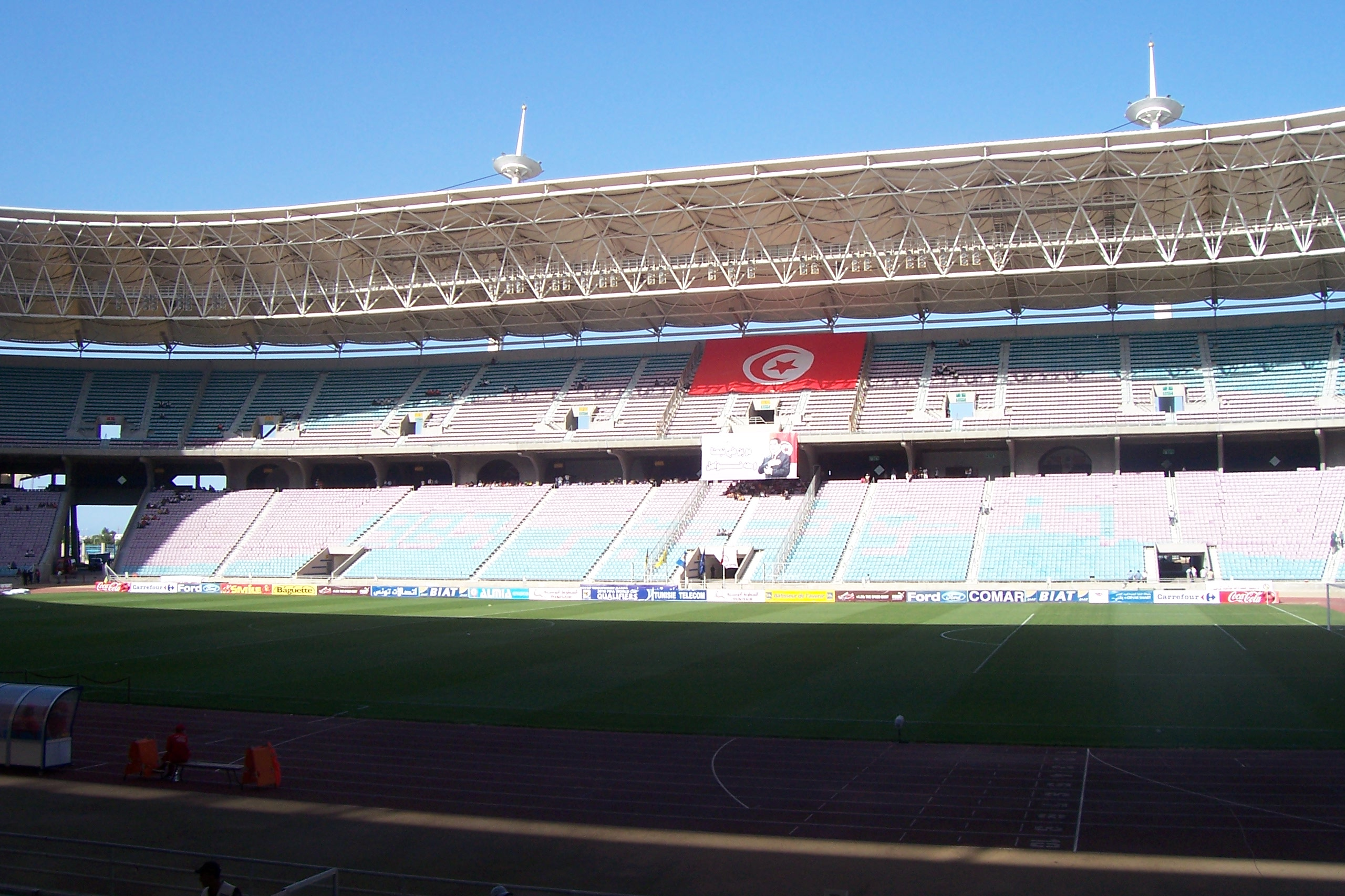
- 7 November Stadium hosted the podium where Al Ahly lifted the trophy
- Event: 2012 CAF Champions League
Al Ahly	ES Tunis
(Egypt)	(Tunisia)
3	2
- on aggregate

First leg
Al Ahly	ES Tunis
1	1
- Date: 4 November 2012
- Venue: Borg El Arab Stadium, Alexandria
- Man of the Match: Moez Ben Cherifia (ES Tunis)
- Referee: Djamel Haimoudi (Algeria)
- Attendance: 25,000

Second Leg
ES Tunis	Al Ahly
1	2
- Date: 17 November 2012
- Venue: Stade Olympique de Radès, Tunis
- Man of the Match: Al-Sayed Hamdy (Al Ahly)
- Referee: Bouchaib El Ahrach (Morocco)
- Attendance: 31,000

The 2012 CAF Champions League final was the final of the 2012 CAF Champions League, the 48th edition of Africa's premier club football tournament organized by the Confederation of African Football (CAF), and the 16th edition under the current CAF Champions League format.

The final was played between Al Ahly from Egypt and ES Tunis from Tunisia. Al Ahly won 3–2 on aggregate (first leg: 1–1; second leg: 2–1) to win a record seventh title. As the winner of the 2012 CAF Champions League, they qualified for the 2012 FIFA Club World Cup as the African representative, as well as participating in the 2013 CAF Super Cup against the winner of the 2012 CAF Confederation Cup.

== Qualified teams ==
Team	Region	Previous finals appearances (bold indicates winners)
(Egypt) Al Ahly	UNAF (North Africa)	**1982**, 1983, **1987**, **2001**, **2005**, **2006**, 2007, **2008**
(Tunisia) ES Tunis	UNAF (North Africa)	**1994**, 1999, 2000, 2010, **2011**

== Road to the final ==
(Egypt) Al Ahly				Round	(Tunisia) ES Tunis			
Opponent	Agg.	1st leg	2nd leg	Qualifying rounds	Opponent	Agg.	1st leg	2nd leg
Bye				Preliminary round	Bye			
(Ethiopia) Ethiopian Coffee	3–0	0–0 (A)	3–0 (H)	First round	(The Gambia) Brikama United	4–2	1–1 (A)	3–1 (H)
(Mali) Stade Malien	3–2	0–1 (A)	3–1 (H)	Second round	(Zimbabwe) Dynamos	7–1	6–0 (H)	1–1 (A)
Opponent	Result			Group stage	Opponent	Result		
(Democratic Republic of the Congo) TP Mazembe	2–1 (H)			Matchday 1	(Nigeria) Sunshine Stars	2–0 (A)		
(Egypt) Zamalek	1–0 (A)			Matchday 2	(Algeria) ASO Chlef	3–2 (H)		
(Ghana) Berekum Chelsea	4–1 (H)			Matchday 3	(Tunisia) Étoile du Sahel	1–0 (H) cancelled^{†}		
(Ghana) Berekum Chelsea	1–1 (A)			Matchday 4	(Tunisia) Étoile du Sahel	2–0 (A) cancelled^{†}		
(Democratic Republic of the Congo) TP Mazembe	0–2 (A)			Matchday 5	(Nigeria) Sunshine Stars	1–0 (H)		
(Egypt) Zamalek	1–1 (H)			Matchday 6	(Algeria) ASO Chlef	0–1 (A)		
Group B Winner: Pos / Team / Pld / Pts; **1** / (Egypt) Al-Ahly / **6** / **11**; 2 / (Democratic Republic of the Congo) TP Mazembe / 6 / **10**; 3 / (Ghana) Berekum Chelsea / 6 / **9**; 4 / (Egypt) Zamalek SC / 6 / **2**; Source: CAF				Final standings	Group A Winner: Pos / Team / Pld / Pts; **1** / (Tunisia) ES Tunis / **4** / **9**; 2 / (Nigeria) Sunshine Stars / 4 / **6**; 3 / (Algeria) ASO Chlef / 4 / **3**; 4 / (Tunisia) Étoile du Sahel / 0 / **0**; Source: CAF			
Opponent	Agg.	1st leg	2nd leg	Knock-out stage	Opponent	Agg.	1st leg	2nd leg
(Nigeria) Sunshine Stars	4–3	3–3 (A)	1–0 (H)	Semifinals	(Democratic Republic of the Congo) TP Mazembe	1–0	0–0 (A)	1–0 (H)

Notes

^{†} The match between Espérance and Étoile du Sahel on Matchday 4 was abandoned due to crowd disturbance. The CAF decided to disqualify Étoile du Sahel as a result and all results obtained previously by them within Group A were cancelled.

== Format ==
The final is decided over two legs, with aggregate goals used to determine the winner. If the sides are level on aggregate after the second leg, the away goals rule applied, and if still level, the tie proceed directly to a penalty shootout (no extra time is played).

== First leg ==
4 November 2012
19:00 UTC+02:00

Al Ahly (Egypt)	1–1	(Tunisia) ES Tunis
Hamdy 88'	Report	Hichri 49'

Borg El Arab Stadium, Alexandria
Attendance: 25,000
Referee: Djamel Haimoudi (Algeria)

**Al Ahly**	**ES Tunis**

GK	1	(Egypt) Sherif Ekramy
RB	24	(Egypt) Ahmed Fathy	(yellow card) 26'
CB	6	(Egypt) Wael Gomaa
CB	4	(Egypt) Sherif Abdel-Fadil		(substituted off) 46'
LB	23	(Egypt) Mohamed Nagieb
DM	14	(Egypt) Hossam Ghaly (c)		(substituted off) 60'
DM	25	(Egypt) Hossam Ashour
AM	19	(Egypt) Abdallah El Said
AM	11	(Egypt) Walid Soliman
CF	22	(Egypt) Mohamed Aboutrika
CF	15	(Egypt) Gedo		(substituted off) 82'
Substitutes:
FW	18	(Egypt) El Sayed Hamdy		(substituted on) 46'
MF	8	(Egypt) Mohamed Barakat		(substituted on) 60'
FW	9	(Egypt) Emad Moteab		(substituted on) 82'
DF	2	(Egypt) Saad Samir
DF	12	(Egypt) Ahmad Shedid Qinawi
GK	16	(Egypt) Mahmoud Abou El-Saoud
MF	30	(Egypt) Shehab El-Din Ahmed
Manager:
(Egypt) Hossam El Badry

GK	1	(Tunisia) Moez Ben Cherifia
RWB	26	(Ghana) Harrison Afful	(yellow card) 55'	(substituted off) 73'
CB	29	(Tunisia) Walid Hichri
CB	17	(Tunisia) Sameh Derbali	(yellow card) 10'
CB	12	(Tunisia) Khalil Chemmam (c)	(yellow card) 45'
LWB	20	(Tunisia) Mohamed Ben Mansour
DM	4	(Tunisia) Houcine Ragued		(substituted off) 86'
DM	13	(Tunisia) Karim Aouadhi	(yellow card) 9'
AM	19	(Tunisia) Khaled Mouelhi
AM	18	(Tunisia) Wajdi Bouazzi
CF	15	(Cameroon) Yannick N'Djeng		(substituted off) 82'
Substitutes:
MF	21	(Tunisia) Mejdi Traoui		(substituted on) 73'
FW	7	(Tunisia) Khaled Ayari		(substituted on) 82'
DF	3	(Tunisia) Chaker Zouagi		(substituted on) 86'
FW	11	(Algeria) Youcef Belaïli
GK	22	(Tunisia) Wassim Naouara
MF	30	(Tunisia) Iheb Msakni
Manager:
(Tunisia) Nabil Maâloul

CAF's Man of the Match:
Moez Ben Cherifia (ES Tunis)

Assistant referees:
Mohamed Bechirène (Algeria)
Bouabdalah Omari (Algeria)
Fourth official:
Mokhtar Amalou (Algeria)

== Second leg ==
17 November 2012
18:30 UTC+01:00

ES Tunis (Tunisia)	1–2	(Egypt) Al Ahly
N'Djeng 85'	Report	Gedo 43'; Soliman 63'

Stade Olympique de Radès, Tunis
Attendance: 31,000
Referee: Bouchaïb El Ahrach (Morocco)

**ES Tunis**	**Al Ahly**

GK	1	(Tunisia) Moez Ben Cherifia	(yellow card) 90'
RB	29	(Tunisia) Walid Hichri
CB	12	(Tunisia) Khalil Chemmam (c)
CB	3	(Tunisia) Chaker Zouagi
LB	20	(Tunisia) Mohamed Ben Mansour	(yellow card) 90+3'
DM	4	(Tunisia) Houcine Ragued		(substituted off) 73'
DM	13	(Tunisia) Karim Aouadhi		(substituted off) 46'
CM	19	(Tunisia) Khaled Mouelhi
RW	28	(Tunisia) Youssef Msakni
CF	15	(Cameroon) Yannick N'Djeng
LW	18	(Tunisia) Wajdi Bouazzi		(substituted off) 56'
Substitutes:
MF	30	(Tunisia) Iheb Msakni		(substituted on) 46'
FW	11	(Algeria) Youcef Belaïli		(substituted on) 56'
FW	7	(Tunisia) Khaled Ayari		(substituted on) 73'
DF	5	(Tunisia) Aymen Ben Amor
GK	22	(Tunisia) Wassim Naouara
MF	24	(Tunisia) Oussama Boughanmi
DF	25	(Tunisia) Seifallah Hosni
Manager:
(Tunisia) Nabil Maâloul

GK	1	(Egypt) Sherif Ekramy
RB	24	(Egypt) Ahmed Fathy
CB	6	(Egypt) Wael Gomaa
CB	12	(Egypt) Ahmad Shedid Qinawi
LB	23	(Egypt) Mohamed Nagieb
DM	14	(Egypt) Hossam Ghaly (c)	(yellow card) 77'
DM	25	(Egypt) Hossam Ashour
AM	19	(Egypt) Abdallah El Said
AM	11	(Egypt) Walid Soliman		(substituted off) 71'
CF	18	(Egypt) El Sayed Hamdy		(substituted off) 66'
CF	15	(Egypt) Gedo		(substituted off) 88'
Substitutes:
FW	22	(Egypt) Mohamed Aboutrika		(substituted on) 66'
DF	26	(Mauritania) Dominique Da Silva		(substituted on) 71'
MF	30	(Egypt) Ramy Rabia		(substituted on) 88'
DF	2	(Egypt) Saad Samir
MF	8	(Egypt) Mohamed Barakat
FW	9	(Egypt) Emad Moteab
GK	16	(Egypt) Mahmoud Abou El-Saoud
Manager:
(Egypt) Hossam El Badry

CAF's Man of the Match:
El Sayed Hamdy (Al Ahly)

Assistant referees:
Redouane Achik (Morocco)
Bouazza Rouani (Morocco)
Fourth official:
Redouane Jiyed (Morocco)
