= 2012 CAF Champions League knockout stage =

The 2012 CAF Champions League knock-out stage matches took place between October and November 2012. The matches were held from 5–7 October (semifinals first leg), 19–21 October (semifinals second leg), 2–4 November (final first leg) and 16–18 November (final second leg).

All knock-out ties were decided over two legs, with aggregate goals used to determine the winner. If the sides were level on aggregate after the second leg, the away goals rule applied, and if still level, the tie proceeded directly to a penalty shootout (no extra time is played).

== Qualified teams ==
The knock-out stage featured four teams: the two group winners and the two group runners-up from the group stage. In the semi-finals, the group A winners played the group B runners-up, and the group B winners played the group A runners-up. In both ties, the group winners hosted the second leg at home.

Group	Winners	Runners-up
A	(Tunisia) ES Tunis	(Nigeria) Sunshine Stars
B	(Egypt) Al-Ahly	(Democratic Republic of the Congo) TP Mazembe

== Semifinals ==
7 October 2012
15:30 UTC+02:00

TP Mazembe (Democratic Republic of the Congo)	0–0	(Tunisia) ES Tunis
	Report

Stade TP Mazembe, Lubumbashi
Referee: Noumandiez Doué (Ivory Coast)
20 October 2012
19:00 UTC+01:00

ES Tunis (Tunisia)	1–0	(Democratic Republic of the Congo) TP Mazembe
Ben Mansour 70'	Report

Stade Olympique de Radès, Tunis
Referee: Badara Diatta (Senegal)

ES Tunis won 1–0 on aggregate and advanced to the 2012 CAF Champions League Final.

6 October 2012
15:00 UTC+01:00

Sunshine Stars (Nigeria)	3–3	(Egypt) Al-Ahly
Temen 38'; Olorundare 73' (pen.); Osasco 84'	Report	Gedo 18', 74'; Hamdy 32'

Otunba Dipo Dina International Stadium, Ijebu Ode
Referee: Daniel Bennett (South Africa)
21 October 2012
20:00 UTC+02:00

Al-Ahly (Egypt)	1–0	(Nigeria) Sunshine Stars
Geddo 28'	Report

30 June Stadium, Cairo
Attendance: 0
Referee: Neant Alioum (Cameroon)

Al-Ahly won 4–3 on aggregate and advanced to the 2012 CAF Champions League Final.

== Final ==
4 November 2012
19:00 UTC+02:00

Al-Ahly (Egypt)	1–1	(Tunisia) ES Tunis
Hamdy 88'	Report	Hichri 49'

Borg El Arab Stadium, Alexandria
Referee: Djamel Haimoudi (Algeria)
17 November 2012
18:30 UTC+01:00

ES Tunis (Tunisia)	1–2	(Egypt) Al-Ahly
N'Djeng 85'	Report	Geddo 43'; Soliman 62'

Stade Olympique de Radès, Tunis
Referee: Bouchaib El Ahrach (Morocco)

Al-Ahly won 3–2 on aggregate.
