= 2012 CAF Champions League group stage =

- Dates: 7 July – 16 September 2014

Tournament statistics
- Matches played: 18
- Goals scored: 46 (2.56 per match)

The 2012 CAF Champions League group stage matches took place between July and September 2012. The matchdays were 6–8 July, 20–22 July, 3–5 August, 17–19 August, 31 August–2 September, and 14–16 September.

The group stage featured the eight winners from the second round. They were divided into two groups of four, where they played each other home-and-away in a round-robin format. The top two teams in each group advanced to the semifinals.

== Seeding ==
The draw for the group stage was held on 15 May 2012, 14:00 UTC+02:00, at the CAF Headquarters in Cairo. The eight teams were seeded into four pots (using their individual 2007–2011 5-Year team Ranking). Each group contained one team from each pot.

Pot 1	Pot 2	Pot 3	Pot 4
(Tunisia) ES Tunis 42 pts; (Democratic Republic of the Congo) TP Mazembe 41 pts	(Egypt) Al-Ahly 36 pts; (Tunisia) Étoile du Sahel 17 pts	(Nigeria) Sunshine Stars 10 pts; (Egypt) Zamalek 2 pts	(Algeria) ASO Chlef 0 pts; (Ghana) Berekum Chelsea 0 pts

== Tiebreakers ==
The order of tie-breakers used when two or more teams have equal number of points is:

1. Number of points obtained in games between the teams concerned
2. Goal difference in games between the teams concerned
3. Away goals scored in games between the teams concerned
4. Goal difference in all games
5. Goals scored in all games

== Groups ==
=== Group A ===
Pos	Team	Pld	W	D	L	GF	GA	GD	Pts	Qualification
1	(Tunisia) ES Tunis	4	3	0	1	6	3	+3	9	Advance to knockout stage
2	(Nigeria) Sunshine Stars	4	2	0	2	4	4	0	6	Advance to knockout stage
3	(Algeria) ASO Chlef	4	1	0	3	4	7	−3	3	
4	(Tunisia) Étoile du Sahel	0	0	0	0	0	0	0	0	Disqualified (Note: The match Étoile du Sahel v Espérance ST on Matchday 4 was abandoned due to crowd disturbance. The CAF decided to disqualify Étoile du Sahel as a result and all results obtained previously by Étoile du Sahel within Group A were cancelled.)

Source: CAF
Rules for classification: Group stage tiebreakers
Notes:
7 July 2012
21:00 UTC+01:00

ASO Chlef (Algeria)	0–1 Annulled	(Tunisia) Étoile du Sahel
	Report	Belaïd 9'

Stade Mohamed Boumezrag, Chlef
Referee: Koman Coulibaly (Mali)
8 July 2012
15:00 UTC+01:00

Sunshine Stars (Nigeria)	0–2	(Tunisia) ES Tunis
	Report	Y. Msakni 20'; N'Djeng 45'

Otunba Dipo Dina International Stadium, Ijebu Ode
Referee: Bakary Gassama (Gambia)

20 July 2012
22:00 UTC+01:00

ES Tunis (Tunisia)	3–2	(Algeria) ASO Chlef
Mouelhi 29' (pen.), 87' (pen.); N'Djeng 90+3'	Report	Mellouli 42'; Messaoud 85'

Stade Olympique de Radès, Tunis
Referee: Bouchaib El Ahrach (Morocco)
21 July 2012
22:00 UTC+01:00

Étoile du Sahel (Tunisia)	0–0 Annulled	(Nigeria) Sunshine Stars
	Report

Stade Olympique de Sousse, Sousse
Referee: Rajindraparsad Seechurn (Mauritius)

5 August 2012
15:00 UTC+01:00

Sunshine Stars (Nigeria)	2–0	(Algeria) ASO Chlef
Olorundare 48'; Azuka 59'	Report

Otunba Dipo Dina International Stadium, Ijebu Ode
Referee: Hamada Nampiandraza (Madagascar)
5 August 2012
22:00 UTC+01:00

ES Tunis (Tunisia)	1–0 Annulled	(Tunisia) Étoile du Sahel
Mouelhi 41' (pen.)	Report

Stade Olympique de Radès, Tunis
Referee: Neant Alioum (Cameroon)

17 August 2012
22:00 UTC+01:00

ASO Chlef (Algeria)	1–2	(Nigeria) Sunshine Stars
Eyenga 48'	Report	Tamen 45+2'; Ukeyima 76'

Stade Mohamed Boumezrag, Chlef
Referee: Aboubacar Bangoura (Guinea)
18 August 2012
22:00 UTC+01:00

Étoile du Sahel (Tunisia)	0–2 Suspended and Annulled	(Tunisia) ES Tunis
	Report	Aouadhi 41'; N'Djeng 74'

Stade Olympique de Sousse, Sousse
Referee: Noumandiez Doué (Ivory Coast)

2 September 2012
20:30 UTC+01:00

ES Tunis (Tunisia)	1–0	(Nigeria) Sunshine Stars
Ebitogwa 52' (o.g.)	Report

Stade Olympique de Radès, Tunis
Referee: Khalid Abdel Rahman (Sudan)

Étoile du Sahel (Tunisia)	Cancelled	(Algeria) ASO Chlef

14 September 2012
20:30 UTC+01:00

ASO Chlef (Algeria)	1–0	(Tunisia) ES Tunis
Eyenga 26'	Report

Stade Mohamed Boumezrag, Chlef
Referee: Eric Otogo-Castane (Gabon)

Sunshine Stars (Nigeria)	Cancelled	(Tunisia) Étoile du Sahel

=== Group B ===
Pos	Team	Pld	W	D	L	GF	GA	GD	Pts	Qualification
1	(Egypt) Al-Ahly	6	3	2	1	9	6	+3	11	Advance to knockout stage
2	(Democratic Republic of the Congo) TP Mazembe	6	3	1	2	9	6	+3	10	Advance to knockout stage
3	(Ghana) Berekum Chelsea	6	2	3	1	9	10	−1	9	
4	(Egypt) Zamalek SC	6	0	2	4	5	10	−5	2	

Source: CAF
Rules for classification: Group stage tiebreakers
7 July 2012
14:00 UTC±00:00

Berekum Chelsea (Ghana)	3–2	(Egypt) Zamalek
Clottey 29', 46', 90+1'	Report	Cissé 22', 34'

Accra Sports Stadium, Accra
Referee: Badara Diatta (Senegal)
8 July 2012
19:30 UTC+02:00

Al-Ahly (Egypt)	2–1	(Democratic Republic of the Congo) TP Mazembe
Moteab 12'; Geddo 90+2'	Report	Samatta 85'

Cairo Military Academy Stadium, Cairo
Attendance: 0
Referee: Noumandiez Doué (Ivory Coast)

22 July 2012
15:30 UTC+02:00

TP Mazembe (Democratic Republic of the Congo)	2–2	(Ghana) Berekum Chelsea
Mputu 11', 32'	Report	Clottey 70' (pen.), 84'

Stade TP Mazembe, Lubumbashi
Referee: Daniel Bennett (South Africa)
22 July 2012
22:00 UTC+02:00

Zamalek (Egypt)	0–1	(Egypt) Al-Ahly
	Report	Aboutrika 79'

Cairo Military Academy Stadium, Cairo
Attendance: 0
Referee: Sylvester Kirwa (Kenya)

4 August 2012
15:30 UTC+02:00

TP Mazembe (Democratic Republic of the Congo)	2–0	(Egypt) Zamalek
Kasongo 70'; Samata 77'	Report

Stade TP Mazembe, Lubumbashi
Referee: Khalid Abdel Rahman (Sudan)
4 August 2012
22:00 UTC+02:00

Al-Ahly (Egypt)	4–1	(Ghana) Berekum Chelsea
Said 17'; Nagieb 33'; Soliman 68', 72'	Report	Clottey 41' (pen.)

Cairo Military Academy Stadium, Cairo
Attendance: 0
Referee: Djamel Haimoudi (Algeria)

19 August 2012
14:00 UTC±00:00

Berekum Chelsea (Ghana)	1–1	(Egypt) Al-Ahly
Opoku 52'	Report	Anicet 43'

Accra Sports Stadium, Accra
Referee: Bouchaib El Ahrach (Morocco)
19 August 2012
22:00 UTC+02:00

Zamalek (Egypt)	1–2	(Democratic Republic of the Congo) TP Mazembe
Omotoyossi 36'	Report	Himoonde 34'; Samata 44'

Cairo Military Academy Stadium, Cairo
Attendance: 0
Referee: Slim Jedidi (Tunisia)

1 September 2012
20:00 UTC+02:00

Zamalek (Egypt)	1–1	(Ghana) Berekum Chelsea
Ibrahim 13'	Report	Nafiu 24'

Cairo Military Academy Stadium, Cairo
Attendance: 3,000
Referee: Koman Coulibaly (Mali)
2 September 2012
15:30 UTC+02:00

TP Mazembe (Democratic Republic of the Congo)	2–0	(Egypt) Al-Ahly
Samata 49'; Kanda 61'	Report

Stade TP Mazembe, Lubumbashi
Referee: Neant Alioum (Cameroon)

16 September 2012
15:00 UTC±00:00

Berekum Chelsea (Ghana)	1–0	(Democratic Republic of the Congo) TP Mazembe
Opoku 80'	Report

Accra Sports Stadium, Accra
Referee: Bakary Gassama (Gambia)
16 September 2012
17:00 UTC+02:00

Al-Ahly (Egypt)	1–1	(Egypt) Zamalek
Barakat 62'	Report	Ibrahim 42'

Borg El Arab Stadium, Alexandria
Attendance: 0
Referee: Slim Jedidi (Tunisia)
