= 2012 CAF Champions League =

Africa's Football Tournament

Tournament details
- Dates: 18 February – 17 November 2012
- Teams: 51 (from 40 associations)

Final positions
- Champions: (Egypt) Al-Ahly (7th title)
- Runners-up: (Tunisia) Espérance ST

Tournament statistics
- Matches played: 113
- Goals scored: 282 (2.5 per match)
- Top scorer(s): (Ghana) Emmanuel Clottey (12 goals)

The 2012 CAF Champions League (also known as the 2012 Orange CAF Champions League for sponsorship reasons) was the 48th edition of Africa's premier club football tournament organized by the Confederation of African Football (CAF), and the 16th edition under the current CAF Champions League format.

Al-Ahly from Egypt won a record-extending seventh title, defeating Espérance ST from Tunisia with a 3–2 win on aggregate in the final. They qualified for the 2012 FIFA Club World Cup, and also earned the right to play in the 2013 CAF Super Cup.

== Association team allocation ==
Theoretically, up to 55 CAF member associations may enter the 2012 CAF Champions League, with the 12 highest ranked associations according to CAF 5-year ranking eligible to enter 2 teams in the competition. For this year's competition, CAF used 2006-10 5-Year ranking. As a result, a maximum of 67 teams could enter the tournament – although this level has never been reached.

=== Ranking system ===
CAF calculates points for each entrant association based on their clubs’ performance over the last 5 years in the CAF Champions League and CAF Confederation Cup, not taking into consideration the running year. The criteria for points are the following:

	CAF Champions League	CAF Confederation Cup
Winner	5 points	4 points
Runner-up	4 points	3 points
Losing semi-finalists	3 points	2 points
3rd place in groups	2 points	1 point
4th place in groups	1 point	1 point

The points are multiplied by a coefficient according to the year as follow:

- 2010 – 5
- 2009 – 4
- 2008 – 3
- 2007 – 2
- 2006 – 1

=== Entrants list ===
Below is the entrants list for the competition. Nations are shown according to their 2006–2010 CAF 5-year ranking – those with a ranking score have their rank and score indicated. Teams were also seeded using their individual 2007–2011 5-Year team Ranking. The top thirteen sides (shown in bold) received byes to the first qualifying round.

Association	Club	Qualifying method
Associations with two entrants (Ranked 1–12)
Tunisia (1st - 97 pts)	**Espérance ST**^{(1st – 42 pts)}	2010–11 Tunisian Ligue Professionnelle 1 champion
Tunisia (1st - 97 pts)	**Étoile du Sahel**^{(6th – 17 pts)}	2010–11 Tunisian Ligue Professionnelle 1 runner-up
Egypt (2nd - 81 pts)	**Al-Ahly**^{(4th – 36 pts)}	2010–11 Egyptian Premier League champion
Egypt (2nd - 81 pts)	Zamalek^{(=15th – 2 pts)}	2010–11 Egyptian Premier League runner-up
(Democratic Republic of the Congo) Congo DR (3rd - 60 pts)	**TP Mazembe**^{(2nd – 41 pts)}	2011 Linafoot champion
(Democratic Republic of the Congo) Congo DR (3rd - 60 pts)	AS Vita Club^{(14th – 3 pts)}	2011 Linafoot runner-up
Nigeria (4th - 58 pts)	Dolphins^{(=15th – 2 pts)}	2010–11 Nigeria Premier League champion
Nigeria (4th - 58 pts)	**Sunshine Stars**^{(=10th – 10 pts)}	2010–11 Nigeria Premier League runner-up
Sudan (5th - 47 pts)	**Al-Merreikh**^{(=10th – 10 pts)}	2011 Sudan Premier League champion
Sudan (5th - 47 pts)	**Al-Hilal**^{(3rd – 37 pts)}	2011 Sudan Premier League runner-up
Algeria (6th - 45 pts)	ASO Chlef	2010–11 Algerian Ligue Professionnelle 1 champion
Algeria (6th - 45 pts)	JSM Béjaïa	2010–11 Algerian Ligue Professionnelle 1 runner-up
Morocco (7th - 27 pts)	**Raja Casablanca**^{(12th – 5 pts)}	2010–11 Botola champion
Morocco (7th - 27 pts)	**Maghreb de Fès**^{(7th – 15 pts)}	2010–11 Botola runner-up
Mali (8th - 21 pts)	**Stade Malien**^{(8th – 12 pts)}	2010–11 Malian Première Division champion
Mali (8th - 21 pts)	**Djoliba**^{(13th – 4 pts)}	2010–11 Malian Première Division runner-up
Zimbabwe (9th - 18 pts)	**Dynamos**^{(=10th – 10 pts)}	2011 Zimbabwe Premier Soccer League champion
Zimbabwe (9th - 18 pts)	FC Platinum	2011 Zimbabwe Premier Soccer League runner-up
Cameroon (11th - 14 pts)	**Coton Sport**^{(5th – 18 pts)}	2010–11 Cameroonian Premier League champion
Cameroon (11th - 14 pts)	Les Astres^{(17th – 1 pt)}	2010–11 Cameroonian Premier League runner-up
Ivory Coast (=12th - 13 pts)^{†}	Africa Sports	2011 Côte d'Ivoire Premier Division champion
Ivory Coast (=12th - 13 pts)^{†}	AFAD Djékanou	2011 Côte d'Ivoire Premier Division runner-up
Associations with one entrant (Fewer ranking points than the 12th CAF association)
Angola (=12th - 13 pts)^{†}	Recreativo do Libolo	2011 Girabola champion
Zambia (=12th - 13 pts)^{†}	Power Dynamos	2011 Zambian Premier League champion
Ghana (15th - 6 pts)	Berekum Chelsea	2010–11 Ghana Premier League champion
Niger (=16th - 5 pts)	ASGNN	2010–11 Niger Premier League champion
South Africa (=16th - 5 pts)	Orlando Pirates	2010–11 Premier Soccer League champion
Equatorial Guinea (18th - 1 pt)	CD Elá Nguema	2011 Equatoguinean Premier League champion
Benin	Tonnerre	2010–11 Benin Premier League leader (league suspended)
Burkina Faso	ASFA Yennenga	2010–11 Burkinabé Premier League champion
Burundi	Athlético Olympic	2010–11 Burundi Premier League champion
Central African Republic	DFC 8ème Arrondissement	2011 Central African Republic League champion
Chad	Foullah Edifice	2011 Ligue de N'Djaména champion
Comoros	Coin Nord	2011 Comoros Premier League champion
(Republic of the Congo) Congo	Diables Noirs	2011 Congo Premier League champion
Ethiopia	Ethiopian Coffee	2010–11 Ethiopian Premier League champion
Gabon	Missile	2010–11 Gabon Championnat National D1 champion
(The Gambia) Gambia	Brikama United	2011 GFA League First Division champion
Guinea	Horoya AC	2011 Guinée Championnat National champion
Kenya	Tusker	2011 Kenyan Premier League champion
Lesotho	Lesotho Correctional Services	2010–11 Lesotho Premier League champion
Liberia	LISCR	2010–11 Liberian Premier League champion
Madagascar	Japan Actuel's	2011 THB Champions League champion
Mozambique	Liga Muçulmana	2011 Moçambola champion
Rwanda	APR	2010–11 Rwandan Premier League champion
Senegal	US Ouakam	2011 Senegal Premier League champion
Sierra Leone	Ports Authority	2011 Sierra Leone National Premier League champion
(Eswatini) Swaziland	Green Mamba	2010–11 Swazi Premier League champion
Tanzania	Young Africans	2010–11 Tanzanian Premier League champion
Uganda	URA	2010–11 Ugandan Super League champion
Zanzibar	Mafunzo	2011 Zanzibar Premier League champion

Notes

- Associations that did not enter a team: Libya (seeded 10th with 16 ranking points and entitled to two entrants), Botswana, Cape Verde, Djibouti, Eritrea, Guinea-Bissau, Malawi, Mauritania, Mauritius, Namibia, Réunion, São Tomé and Príncipe, Seychelles, Somalia, Togo
- ^{†} According to the formula for calculating the CAF 5-year ranking, Angola, Ivory Coast and Zambia are tied 12th place with 13 ranking points. As stated in local media reports, Ivory Coast have two entrants, while Angola and Zambia have one entrant.
- Unranked associations have no ranking points and hence are equal 19th.
- Unranked teams have no rankings points and hence are equal 18th. Club ranking is determined only between teams qualified for the 2012 CAF Champions League.

== Round and draw dates ==
Schedule of dates for 2012 competition.

Phase	Round	Draw date	First leg	Second leg
Qualifying	Preliminary round	9 December 2011 (Cairo, Egypt)	17–19 February	2–4 March
Qualifying	First round	9 December 2011 (Cairo, Egypt)	23–25 March	6–8 April
Qualifying	Second round	9 December 2011 (Cairo, Egypt)	27–29 April	11–13 May
Group stage	Matchday 1	15 May 2012 (Cairo, Egypt)	6–8 July	
Group stage	Matchday 2	15 May 2012 (Cairo, Egypt)	20–22 July	
Group stage	Matchday 3	15 May 2012 (Cairo, Egypt)	3–5 August	
Group stage	Matchday 4	15 May 2012 (Cairo, Egypt)	17–19 August	
Group stage	Matchday 5	15 May 2012 (Cairo, Egypt)	31 August–2 September	
Group stage	Matchday 6	15 May 2012 (Cairo, Egypt)	14–16 September	
Knock-out stage	Semifinals	15 May 2012 (Cairo, Egypt)	5–7 October	19–21 October
Knock-out stage	Final	15 May 2012 (Cairo, Egypt)	2–4 November	16–18 November^{†}

^{†} Moved from original date of 9–11 November.

== Qualifying rounds ==
The fixtures for the preliminary, first and second qualifying rounds were announced on 9 December 2011.

Qualification ties were decided over two legs, with aggregate goals used to determine the winner. If the sides were level on aggregate after the second leg, the away goals rule was applied, and if still level, the tie proceeded directly to a penalty shootout (no extra time was played).

=== Preliminary round ===
Team 1	Agg.	Team 2	1st leg	2nd leg
ASFA Yennenga (Burkina Faso)	1–4	(Algeria) ASO Chlef	0–0	1–4
AS Vita Club (Democratic Republic of the Congo)	6–4	(Burundi) Atlético Olympic	5–0	1–4
DFC 8ème Arrondissement (Central African Republic)	2–2 (a)	(Cameroon) Astres FC	1–0	1–2
Young Africans (Tanzania)	1–2	(Egypt) Zamalek	1–1	0–1
Missile (Gabon)	3–4	(Ivory Coast) Africa Sports	3–2	0–2
Ports Authority (Sierra Leone)	0–1	(Guinea) Horoya AC	0–0	0–1
Foullah Edifice (Chad)	1–3	(Algeria) JSM Béjaïa	0–0	1–3
AFAD Djékanou (Ivory Coast)	2–0	(Republic of the Congo) Diables Noirs	1–0	1–0
Tusker (Kenya)	0–1	(Rwanda) APR	0–0	0–1
Coin Nord (Comoros)	2–4	(Ethiopia) Ethiopian Coffee	1–0	1–4
ASGNN (Niger)	0–1	(Benin) Tonnerre	0–0	0–1
Orlando Pirates (South Africa)	2–4	(Angola) Recreativo do Libolo	1–3	1–1
URA (Uganda)	3–0	Lesotho Correctional Services	3–0	0–0
Mafunzo (Zanzibar)	0–5	(Mozambique) Liga Muçulmana	0–2	0–3
Brikama United (The Gambia)	1–1 (3–1 p)	(Senegal) US Ouakam	0–1	1–0
Sony Elá Nguema (Equatorial Guinea)	0–6	(Nigeria) Dolphins	0–3	0–3
LISCR (Liberia)	0–5	(Ghana) Berekum Chelsea	0–2	0–3
Green Mamba (Eswatini)	2–8	(Zimbabwe) FC Platinum	2–4	0–4
Japan Actuel's (Madagascar)	1–8	(Zambia) Power Dynamos	1–5	0–3

=== First round ===
Team 1	Agg.	Team 2	1st leg	2nd leg
ASO Chlef (Algeria)	3–2	(Democratic Republic of the Congo) AS Vita Club	0–0	3–2
DFC 8ème Arrondissement (Central African Republic)	1–8	(Sudan) Al-Hilal	0–3	1–5
Zamalek (Egypt)	2–2 (a)	(Ivory Coast) Africa Sports	1–0	1–2
Horoya AC (Guinea)	1–4	(Morocco) Maghreb de Fès	1–1	0–3
JSM Béjaïa (Algeria)	1–5	(Ivory Coast) AFAD Djékanou	1–2	0–3
APR (Rwanda)	2–3	(Tunisia) Étoile du Sahel	0–0	2–3
Ethiopian Coffee (Ethiopia)	0–3	(Egypt) Al-Ahly	0–0	0–3
Tonnerre (Benin)	2–5	(Mali) Stade Malien	0–0	2–5
Recreativo do Libolo (Angola)	4–4 (a)	(Nigeria) Sunshine Stars	4–1	0–3
URA (Uganda)	w/o^{1}	(Mali) Djoliba	0–2	—
Liga Muçulmana (Mozambique)	2–3	(Zimbabwe) Dynamos	2–2	0–1
Brikama United (The Gambia)	2–4	(Tunisia) Espérance ST	1–1	1–3
Dolphins (Nigeria)	2–2 (a)	(Cameroon) Coton Sport	2–1	0–1
Berekum Chelsea (Ghana)	5–3	(Morocco) Raja Casablanca	5–0	0–3
FC Platinum (Zimbabwe)	2–5	(Sudan) Al-Merreikh	2–2	0–3
Power Dynamos (Zambia)	1–7	(Democratic Republic of the Congo) TP Mazembe	1–1	0–6

Notes

- Note 1: Djoliba advanced to the second round after being awarded the tie by CAF, as URA did not travel to Mali for the second leg due to the Malian crisis.

=== Second round ===
Team 1	Agg.	Team 2	1st leg	2nd leg
Al-Hilal (Sudan)	2–2 (2–4 p)	(Algeria) ASO Chlef	1–1	1–1
Maghreb de Fès (Morocco)	0–4	(Egypt) Zamalek	0–2	0–2
Étoile du Sahel (Tunisia)	4–2	(Ivory Coast) AFAD Djékanou	4–1	0–1
Stade Malien (Mali)	2–3	(Egypt) Al-Ahly	1–0	1–3
Djoliba (Mali)	1–2	(Nigeria) Sunshine Stars	1–1	0–1
Espérance ST (Tunisia)	7–1	(Zimbabwe) Dynamos	6–0	1–1
Berekum Chelsea (Ghana)	2–1	(Cameroon) Coton Sport	0–0	2–1
TP Mazembe (Democratic Republic of the Congo)	3–1	(Sudan) Al-Merreikh	2–0	1–1

The losing teams from the second round advanced to the 2012 CAF Confederation Cup play-off round.

== Group stage ==
The draw for the group stage was held on 15 May 2012. The eight teams were seeded into four pots (using their individual 2007–2011 5-Year team Ranking). Each group contained one team from each pot. The matchdays were 6–8 July, 20–22 July, 3–5 August, 17–19 August, 31 August–2 September, and 14–16 September.

Key to colours in group tables
Group winners and runners-up advance to the Semifinals

=== Group A ===
Pos	Team	Pld	W	D	L	GF	GA	GD	Pts	Qualification	EST	SST	ASO	ESS
1	(Tunisia) ES Tunis	4	3	0	1	6	3	+3	9	Advance to knockout stage	—	1–0	3–2	~~1–0~~
2	(Nigeria) Sunshine Stars	4	2	0	2	4	4	0	6	Advance to knockout stage	0–2	—	2–0	–
3	(Algeria) ASO Chlef	4	1	0	3	4	7	−3	3		1–0	1–2	—	~~0–1~~
4	(Tunisia) Étoile du Sahel	0	0	0	0	0	0	0	0	Disqualified (Note: The match Étoile du Sahel v Espérance ST on Matchday 4 was abandoned due to crowd disturbance. The CAF decided to disqualify Étoile du Sahel as a result and all results obtained previously by Étoile du Sahel within Group A were cancelled.)	~~0–2~~	~~0–0~~	–	—

Source: CAF
Rules for classification: Group stage tiebreakers

=== Group B ===
Pos	Team	Pld	W	D	L	GF	GA	GD	Pts	Qualification	AHL	TPM	BER	ZAM
1	(Egypt) Al-Ahly	6	3	2	1	9	6	+3	11	Advance to knockout stage	—	2–1	4–1	1–1
2	(Democratic Republic of the Congo) TP Mazembe	6	3	1	2	9	6	+3	10	Advance to knockout stage	2–0	—	2–2	2–0
3	(Ghana) Berekum Chelsea	6	2	3	1	9	10	−1	9		1–1	1–0	—	3–2
4	(Egypt) Zamalek SC	6	0	2	4	5	10	−5	2		0–1	1–2	1–1	—

Source: CAF
Rules for classification: Group stage tiebreakers

== Knock-out stage ==
=== Bracket ===
Semi-finals
1	(Nigeria) Sunshine Stars	3	0	3
4	(Egypt) Al Ahly	3	1	4
3	(Democratic Republic of the Congo) TP Mazembe	0	0	0
2	(Tunisia) Espérance ST	0	1	1

Final
(Egypt) Al Ahly	1	2	3
(Tunisia) Espérance ST	1	1	2

=== Semifinals ===
Team 1	Agg.	Team 2	1st leg	2nd leg
Sunshine Stars (Nigeria)	3–4	(Egypt) Al Ahly	3–3	0–1
TP Mazembe (Democratic Republic of the Congo)	0–1	(Tunisia) Espérance ST	0–0	0–1

=== Final ===
4 November 2012
19:00 UTC+02:00

Al Ahly (Egypt)	1–1	(Tunisia) Espérance de Tunis
Hamdy 88'	Report	Hichri 49'

Borg El Arab Stadium, Alexandria
Attendance: 25,000
Referee: Djamel Haimoudi (Algeria)
17 November 2012
18:30 UTC+01:00

Espérance de Tunis (Tunisia)	1–2	(Egypt) Al Ahly
N'Djeng 85'	Report	Geddo 43'; Soliman 61'

Stade Olympique de Radès, Tunis
Attendance: 31,000
Referee: Bouchaïb El Ahrach (Morocco)

== Top scorers ==
Rank	Name	Team	Goals
1	(Ghana) Emmanuel Clottey	(Ghana) Berekum Chelsea	12
2	(Egypt) Mohamed Aboutrika	(Egypt) Al-Ahly	6
2	(Tanzania) Mbwana Samata	(Democratic Republic of the Congo) TP Mazembe	6
2	(Democratic Republic of the Congo) Tresor Mputu	(Democratic Republic of the Congo) TP Mazembe	6
5	(Egypt) Geddo	(Egypt) Al-Ahly	5
5	(Nigeria) Izu Azuka	(Nigeria) Sunshine Stars	5
5	(Cameroon) Yannick N'Djeng	(Tunisia) Espérance ST	5
8	(Algeria) Karim Ali Hadji	(Algeria) ASO Chlef	4
8	(Angola) Rasca	(Angola) Recreativo do Libolo	4
8	(Sudan) Mudather El Tahir	(Sudan) Al-Hilal	4
8	(Tunisia) Youssef Msakni	(Tunisia) Espérance ST	4

== See also ==
- 2012 CAF Confederation Cup
- 2013 CAF Super Cup
- 2012 FIFA Club World Cup
