= Gnahoui =

Gnahoui is a surname. Notable people with the surname include:

- Franck Gnahoui (born 1988), Beninese footballer
- Jacob Gnahoui (born 1985), Beninese judoka
