= Stade Municipal de Bohicon =

Sports venue in Bohicon, Benin

- Stade Municipal de Bohicon
- Interactive map of Stade Municipal de Bohicon
- Full name: Stade Municipal de Bohicon
- Location: Bohicon, Benin
- Coordinates: 7.1953°N 2.0579°E
- Capacity: 5,000

Tenant
- Tonnerre d'Abomey FC

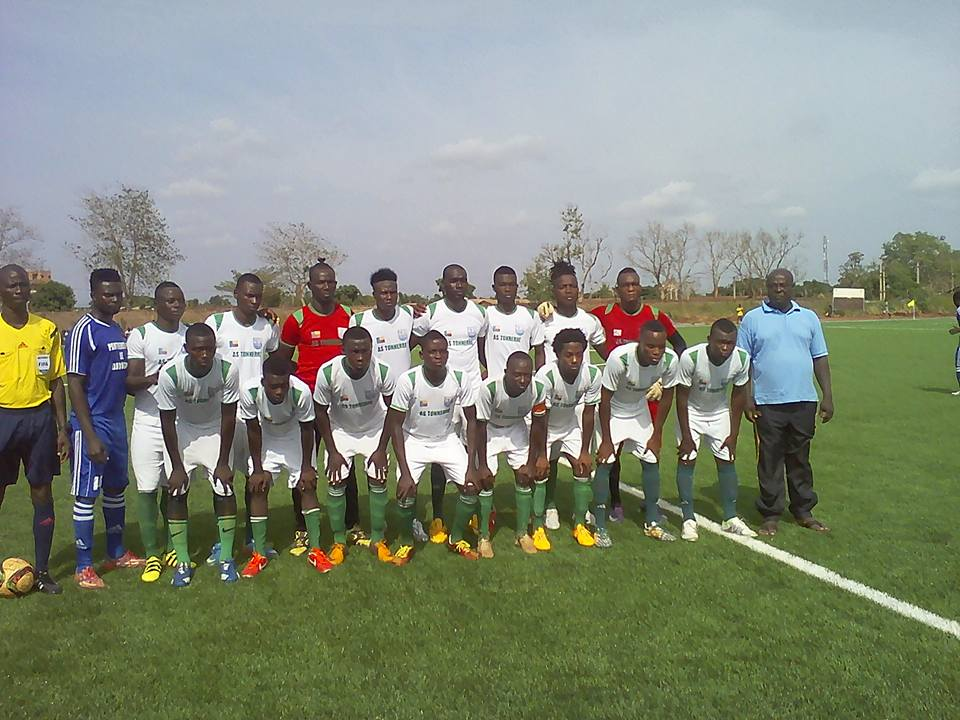
Stade Paulin Tomanaga de Bohicon avec l'équipe locale Tonnerre FC

Stade Municipal de Bohicon is a multi-use stadium in Bohicon, Benin. It is currently used mostly for football matches and is the home ground of Tonnerre d'Abomey FC of the Benin Premier League. The stadium has a capacity of 5,000 spectators.
