= Patrick Kamgaing =

Cameroonian footballer

Personal information
- Date of birth: 11 November 1990 (age 36)
- Place of birth: Douala, Cameroon
- Height: 1.82 m (6 ft 0 in)
- Position: Midfielder

Senior career*
Years	Team	Apps	(Gls)
2008–2011	Muaither SC		
2011–2012	ASO Chlef		
2013–2014	Javor Ivanjica	5	(0)
2014	→ Majees SC (loan)		
2015	Erdekspor	7	(0)
2015	Çanakkalespor	8	(0)
2016	Ortaca Belediyespor	10	(0)

International career^{‡}
2011	Cameroon U-23		
- * Club domestic league appearances and goals as of 1 August 2016 ‡ National team caps and goals as of 4 April 2013

Patrick Kamgaing (born 11 November 1990) is a Cameroonian professional footballer who plays as a midfielder.

== Club career ==
Born in Douala, Kamgaing played in Qatar with Al-Mu'aidar Sports Club between 2008 and 2011. In summer 2011 he moved to Algeria and joined the, back then championship title holders, ASO Chlef, having played in the 2011–12 Algerian Ligue Professionnelle 1 and finished 5th at the end of the season. He played in the 2012 CAF Champions League and played the first half of the 2012–13 season, but during the winter break he moved to Serbia and joined a top tier club FK Javor Ivanjica. After a successful trial, he signed with Javor a two-year contract which expired in January 2015. He made his debut with Javor in the 2012–13 Serbian SuperLiga on 2 March 2013, in a home match against FK Smederevo which finished with Javor victory by 4-0.

In 2014, he played with Omani club Majees SC. In February 2015 he signed with Turkish club Erdekspor coming from Javor Ivanjica. Then he stayed in Turkey where he played with Çanakkalespor and Ortaca Belediyespor.

== International career ==
Kamgaing was part of the Cameroon U23 national team at the qualifications and in the final phase of the 2011 All-Africa Games having won the silver medal after losing in the final against Ghana by 0-1.
