= Yves Magola Mapanda =

Congolese footballer

Personal information
- Date of birth: 20 April 1990 (age 36)
- Place of birth: Kinshasa, Zaïre
- Height: 1.70 m (5 ft 7 in)
- Position: Midfielder

Team information
- Current team: Kabuscorp

Senior career*
Years	Team	Apps	(Gls)
2011–2016	AS Vita Club		
2016–	Kabuscorp		

International career^{‡}
2011–2015	DR Congo	4	(0)
- * Club domestic league appearances and goals as of 14 June 2021 ‡ National team caps and goals as of 14 June 2021

Yves Magola Mapanda (born 20 April 1990) is a Congolese football midfielder who plays for Kabuscorp.
