= Franck Gnahoui =

Beninese footballer (born 1988)

Personal information
- Date of birth: 1 March 1988 (age 38)
- Place of birth: Benin
- Position: Striker

Senior career*
| Years | Team | Apps | (Gls) |
| –2009 | Energie | | |
| 2009–2011 | Tonnerre | | |
| 2011–2016 | Brozany | | |
| 2017 | Tonnerre | | |
| 2018–2019 | UPI ONM | | |

International career
| 2007 | Benin | 1 | (0) |
- * Club domestic league appearances and goals

Franck Claver Gnahoui David (born 1 March 1988) is a Beninese former footballer who played as a striker.

== Career ==
In 2011, Gnahoui signed for Czech third-tier side Brozany after trialing for Žižkov in the Czech top flight and Czech second-tier club Ústí .
