= Akombo Ukeyima =

Nigerian footballer

Ukeyima Akombo
Personal information
- Full name: Ukeyima Akombo
- Date of birth: November 25, 1987 (age 38)
- Place of birth: Mokwa, Nigeria
- Height: 1.93 m (6 ft 4 in)
- Position: Striker

Team information
- Current team: Lobi Stars
- Number: 17

Senior career*
Years	Team	Apps	(Gls)
2006–2007	Kwara United F.C.		
2007–2010	GIF Sundsvall	19	(1)
2008–2009	→ IFK Mariehamn (loan)	8	(2)
2011–2013	Sunshine Stars F.C.		
2014–	Lobi Stars F.C.		
- * Club domestic league appearances and goals as of December 1, 2009

Akombo Ukeyima (born November 25, 1987) is a Nigerian footballer, who currently plays for Lobi Stars F.C.

== Career ==
Before joining Åland based club, Ukeyima played for the Swedish outfit GIF Sundsvall. In January 2009, he left IFK Mariehamn in the Finnish Premier Division after a loan period, and returned to Sundsvall.

Ukeyima made his debut for Mariehamn on August 31, 2008, and scored the opening goal in his new club's 2 – 1 victory over RoPS.

Before moving to Scandinavia he played for Kwara United F.C. until January 2007. The striker left in January 2011 his club GIF Sundsvall and returned to Nigeria, who signed for Sunshine Stars F.C.
