= Gedo (footballer) =

Egyptian footballer (born 1984)

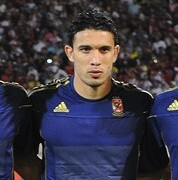
- Gedo with Al Ahly in 2011

Personal information
- Full name: Mohamed Nagy Ismail Afash
- Date of birth: 30 October 1984 (age 42)
- Place of birth: Damanhur, Beheira, Egypt
- Height: 1.84 m (6 ft 0 in)
- Position: Forward

Youth career
- 2001–2002: Hosh Essa Sports Centre

Senior career*
| Years | Team | Apps | (Gls) |
| 2002–2005 | Ala'ab Damanhour | | |
| 2005–2010 | Al Ittihad Al Sakandary | 74 | (11) |
| 2010–2015 | Al Ahly | 54 | (13) |
| 2013 | → Hull City (loan) | 12 | (5) |
| 2013–2014 | → Hull City (loan) | 2 | (0) |
| 2015–2016 | El-Entag El-Harby | 33 | (7) |
| 2016–2018 | El Mokawloon | 52 | (9) |
| 2018–2020 | El Gouna | 46 | (3) |
| Total | | 273 | (48) |

International career
| 2009–2014 | Egypt | 36 | (19) |
Medal record
Men's football
Representing Egypt
Africa Cup of Nations
| Gold medal – first place | 2010 Angola |
- * Club domestic league appearances and goals

Mohamed Nagy Ismail Afash (Arabic: محمد ناجى إسماعيل; born 30 October 1984), commonly known as Gedo (Arabic: جدّو, IPA: [ˈɡedːo], Egyptian Arabic: Grandpa), is an Egyptian former professional footballer who played as a forward.

== Club career ==
=== Early career ===
Born in Damanhur, Beheira, Gedo started his career at Hosh Essa youth centre. When he was 17, he joined Ala'ab Damanhour, a club in the Egyptian Second Division, before joining Al-Ittihad Al-Sakndary in 2005.

=== Al Ahly ===
Before the start of the 2010–11 campaign, Gedo joined Egyptian giant Al Ahly, after much speculation of the player signing for Zamalek in January, which the player admitted. The case was presented to the Egyptian football association. A decision was made to charge Gedo 2,200,000 Egyptian pounds, with the ability to resume his career with Al Ahly. Gedo made his debut for Al Ahly against Ismaily in CAF Champions League 2010. Gedo scored eight goals in his first season with Ahly. Due to the Port Said Stadium disaster, the Egyptian Premier League was cancelled that season, and Ahly were only playing in CAF Champions League, playing once every two weeks or so. Gedo's form had dropped in the preliminary stages of the 2012 Champions League as he scored no goals in four matches. However, when the Ahly started playing in the group stage, Gedo participated in all six games starting two matches and being used as a sub in four. He scored the winner in a 2–1 win against TP Mazembe in the process. Gedo's form started to pick up again in September and carried through into October. He scored in a 2–1 win against ENPPI in the 2011 Egyptian Super Cup, scored twice in the first leg against Sunshine Stars which finished 3–3, and the winner in a 1–0 win in the second leg of the 2012 CAF Champions League semi-final against Sunshine Stars, putting Ahly in the Champions League final against Esperance ST. He went into the final scoring four goals in his past three. Gedo was scoreless in a 1–1 draw in the first leg at home in Alexandria. However, in the second leg, Gedo scored Ahly's first goal in the 43rd minute in his side's 2–1 away victory over Esperance. Ahly won the Champions League that year and Gedo had won his first ever CAF Champions League title.

=== Hull City (loan) ===
On 31 January 2013, Gedo moved to Championship side Hull City on loan for the remainder of the 2012–13 season. He made his debut on 9 February 2013 when he replaced Robert Koren in the 70th minute of the loss away to Brighton & Hove Albion. On 12 February 2013 he came on at half-time again as a substitute for Robert Koren in the home match against Derby County, scoring the opening goal of the game within 90 seconds of coming on. Hull City went on to win 2–1. On 16 February 2013, Gedo made his full debut and scored his second goal for Hull City in the next Championship fixture, a 1–0 victory over Charlton Athletic, being substituted to a standing ovation in the 88th minute. On 19 February 2013, Gedo continued to impress everybody when he scored his third goal against Blackburn Rovers in the Championship to make it three goals in three games and keep Hull City's chances to advance into the Premier League. After a disappointing defeat away at Bolton Wanderers, the East Yorkshire side's next home game was a 5–2 demolition of Birmingham City with Gedo grabbing two goals to take his impressive record to 5 goals in 4 home games and 6 overall.

Gedo returned to the KC Stadium for a season-long loan on transfer deadline day, 2 September 2013.

=== Return to Egypt ===
Gedo returned to Egypt to play for El-Entag El-Harby, El Mokawloon and El Gouna, in which he announced his departure from the latter in October 2020.

=== Retirement ===
On 10 January 2021, Gedo announced his retirement via Twitter, after ending his contract with El Gouna.

== International career ==
He has represented Egypt national football team, making his debut against Malawi on 29 December 2009. Gedo was named as part of the 2010 African Cup of Nations squad. He admitted he was surprised by his inclusion in the squad and had read on the internet that he was included. Gedo scored his first international goal in Dubai against Mali after coming on as a substitute in the 1–0 on 4 January in the build up to the African Cup of Nations. In the opening match for the Egyptian team in the Cup of Nations, he scored the third goal in the 3–1 victory over Nigeria on 12 January. Four days later he scored a goal in Egypt's 2–0 win over Mozambique. In the quarter-final of the tournament, he scored in Egypt's 3–1 win over Cameroon. Gedo scored again in the semi-final on 28 January. He scored the fourth goal in Egypt's 4–0 victory over Algeria. In the 2010 Africa Cup of Nations final against Ghana, he scored the match's only goal in the 84th minute which led Egypt to a 1–0 victory and their seventh title. Gedo came on as a substitute in the six games of the tournament, playing a total of 173 minutes. Yet he was named top scorer of the tournament with five goals, meaning that in Angola he scored a goal every 35 minutes he played.

== Career statistics ==
Scores and results list Egypt's goal tally first, score column indicates score after each Gedo goal.

List of international goals scored by Gedo
| No. | Date | Venue | Opponent | Score | Result | Competition |
|---|---|---|---|---|---|---|
| 1 | 4 January 2010 | Al-Rashid Stadium, Dubai, United Arab Emirates | Mali | 1–0 | 1–0 | Friendly |
| 2 | 12 January 2010 | Complexo da Sr. da Graça, Benguela, Angola | Nigeria | 3–1 | 3–1 | 2010 Africa Cup of Nations |
| 3 | 12 January 2010 | Complexo da Sr. da Graça, Benguela, Angola | Mozambique | 2–0 | 2–0 | 2010 Africa Cup of Nations |
| 4 | 25 January 2010 | Complexo da Sr. da Graça, Benguela, Angola | Cameroon | 2–1 | 3–1 | 2010 Africa Cup of Nations |
| 5 | 28 January 2010 | Complexo da Sr. da Graça, Benguela, Angola | Algeria | 4–0 | 4–0 | 2010 Africa Cup of Nations |
| 6 | 31 January 2010 | Estádio 11 de Novembro, Luanda, Angola | Ghana | 1–0 | 1–0 | 2010 Africa Cup of Nations Final |
| 7 | 11 August 2010 | Cairo International Stadium, Cairo, Egypt | DR Congo | 5–3 | 6–3 | Friendly |
| 8 | 17 November 2010 | Cairo International Stadium, Cairo, Egypt | Australia | 2–0 | 3–0 | Friendly |
| 9 | 8 January 2011 | Arab Contractors Stadium, Cairo, Egypt | Uganda | 1–0 | 1–0 | 2011 Nile Basin Tournament |
| 10 | 11 January 2011 | Ismailia Stadium, Ismaïlia, Egypt | Burundi | 1–0 | 3–0 | 2011 Nile Basin Tournament |
| 11 | 17 January 2011 | Cairo Military Academy Stadium, Cairo, Egypt | Uganda | 3–0 | 3–1 | 2011 Nile Basin Tournament |
| 12 | 15 April 2012 | Al-Rashid Stadium, Dubai, United Arab Emirates | Mauritania | 1–0 | 3–0 | Friendly |
| 13 | 15 April 2012 | Al-Rashid Stadium, Dubai, United Arab Emirates | Mauritania | 2–0 | 3–0 | Friendly |
| 14 | 22 May 2012 | Al-Merrikh Stadium, Omdurman, Sudan | Togo | 1–0 | 3–0 | Friendly |
| 15 | 12 October 2012 | Khalid Bin Mohammed Stadium, Sharjah, United Arab Emirates | Congo | 2–0 | 3–0 | Friendly |
| 16 | 28 December 2012 | Thani bin Jassim Stadium, Doha, Qatar | Qatar | 2–0 | 2–0 | Friendly |
| 17 | 14 January 2013 | Zayed Sports City Stadium, Abu Dhabi, United Arab Emirates | Ivory Coast | 2–3 | 2–4 | Friendly |
| 18 | 19 November 2013 | 30 June Stadium, Cairo, Egypt | Ghana | 2–0 | 2–1 | 2014 FIFA World Cup qualifier |
| 19 | 5 March 2014 | Tivoli-Neu, Innsbruck, Austria | Bosnia and Herzegovina | 1–0 | 2–0 | Friendly |

== Honours and achievements ==
Al Ahly

- Egyptian Premier League: 2010–11, 2013–14
- Egyptian Super Cup: 2010
- CAF Champions League: 2012
- CAF Super Cup: 2013

Egypt

- African Cup of Nations: 2010
- Nile Basin Tournament: 2011

Individual

- Africa Cup of Nations Discovery Player of the Tournament: 2010
- Africa Cup of Nations Dream Team: 2010
- Africa Cup of Nations Top scorer: 2010
