= Tonnerre d'Abomey FC =

Beninese football club

Tonnerre d'Abomey
- Full name: Tonnerre d'Abomey Football Club
- Ground: Stade Municipal de Bohicon; Abomey, Benin
- Capacity: 5,000
- Manager: Wabi Gomez
- League: Benin Premier League
- 2013–14: Benin Premier League, 10th

Tonnerre d'Abomey FC is a Beninese professional football club based in Abomey. They currently play in the Benin Premier League.

== Former players ==
- (Benin) Franck Gnahoui
- (Togo) Djené Dakonam

== Achievements ==
- Benin Premier League: 1

2007

== Performance in CAF competitions ==
- CAF Champions League: 2 appearances

2008 – Preliminary round
