= Anicet Eyenga =

Cameroonian footballer (born 1986)

Personal information
- Date of birth: 9 August 1986 (age 40)
- Place of birth: Yaoundé, Cameroon
- Height: 1.91 m (6 ft 3 in)
- Position: Striker

Youth career
- Essec de Douala
- Cotonsport Garoua

Senior career*
Years	Team	Apps	(Gls)
2004	Espoir de Maroua	20	(4)
2005	Negeri Sembilan	9	(0)
2005–2006	Olympiacos Volos	22	(6)
2006–2007	KF Elbasani	15	(2)
2007–2008	Lapta Türk Birliği	2	(0)
2008	Görnec KSK	1	(0)
2008	Çetinkaya	14	(5)
2009–2010	Cotonsport Garoua	29	(23)
2010	MO Constantine	2	(0)
2010	Strasbourg	4	(1)
2010	Nyiregyhaza Spartacus	3	(1)
2010	Hải Phòng F.C.	12	(0)
2011	Sliema Wanderers	8	(3)
2012–2013	ASO Chlef	14	(1)
2013–2014	Olympique Safi	3	(0)
2014–2015	Duhok SC		
- SV Oberkirch
2018–2019	FCSR Haguenau		

International career
	Cameroon	4	(0)
- * Club domestic league appearances and goals

Anicet Eyenga (born 9 August 1986) is a Cameroonian former professional footballer who played as a striker.

== Career ==
Eyenga was born in Douala. In 2010 Eyenga played for Cotonsport Garoua In June 2010 he joined RC Strasbourg.

During his career played in Germany, France, Vietnam, Turkey, Finland, Malaysia, Algeria, Morocco. Northern Cyprus, Greece, Hungary, Malta and Albania.

Eyenga trialled with Veikkausliiga club Rovaniemi PS in February 2015 and appeared in the 2015 Finnish League Cup during this time.

He later played for SV Oberkirch in the German Landesliga Südbaden.
