= Mohamed Moukrim Ben Mansour =

Moroccan wrestler

Personal information
- Nationality: Moroccan
- Born: 5 April 1938 (age 86); Casablanca, Morocco

Sport
- Sport: Wrestling

Mohamed Moukrim Ben Mansour (born 5 April 1938) is a Moroccan wrestler. He competed at the 1960 Summer Olympics and the 1968 Summer Olympics.
