= Karim Ali Hadji =

Algerian footballer (born 1981)

Personal information
- Full name: Karim Ali Hadji
- Date of birth: May 14, 1981 (age 45)
- Place of birth: Chlef, Algeria
- Height: 1.67 m (5 ft 6 in)
- Position: Forward

Team information
- Current team: ASO Chlef
- Number: 7

Senior career*
Years	Team	Apps	(Gls)
1999–2004	ASO Chlef	-	(-)
2004–2006	USM Alger	12	(0)
2006	ASO Chlef	11	(3)
2006–2007	MO Béjaïa	16	(2)
2007–	ASO Chlef	86	(12)

International career
2003	Algeria U23	6	(2)
- * Club domestic league appearances and goals as of 00:00, May 14, 2012 (UTC)

Karim Ali Hadji (born May 14, 1981) is an Algerian footballer. He currently plays as an attacking midfielder for ASO Chlef in the Algerian Ligue Professionnelle 1.

== Honours ==
- Won the Algerian Ligue Professionnelle 1 twice:
  - Once with USM Alger in 2004–05
  - Once with ASO Chlef in 2010–11
