= Medrano Tamen =

Cameroonian footballer

Personal information
- Full name: Josue Tamen Medrano Ngathie
- Date of birth: 28 March 1996 (age 30)
- Place of birth: Cameroon
- Height: 1.76 m (5 ft 9 in)
- Position: Midfielder
| 2010–2015 | Sunshine Stars F.C. | 25 | (3) |
| 2016–2017 | Ifeanyi Ubah F.C. | 28 | (5) |
| 2018 | F.C. Mouna Akoupe | 3 | (0) |
- ‡ National team caps and goals as of 12 May 2016

Josue Tamen Medrano Ngathie (born 28 March 1996) is a Cameroonian professional footballer who currently plays as a midfielder for Ivorian club F.C. Mouna Akoupe.

== Career ==
Tamen began his Junior career with PMUC Douala. In 2006, he transferred to Cotonsport Garoua, where he played until 2008.

Despite his young age, Tamen's unique play style saw him through into division one side, Tiko United, where his season opened up for international opportunities with Sunshine Stars F.C of Nigeria.
