= Emmanuel Clottey =

Ghanaian footballer (born 1987)

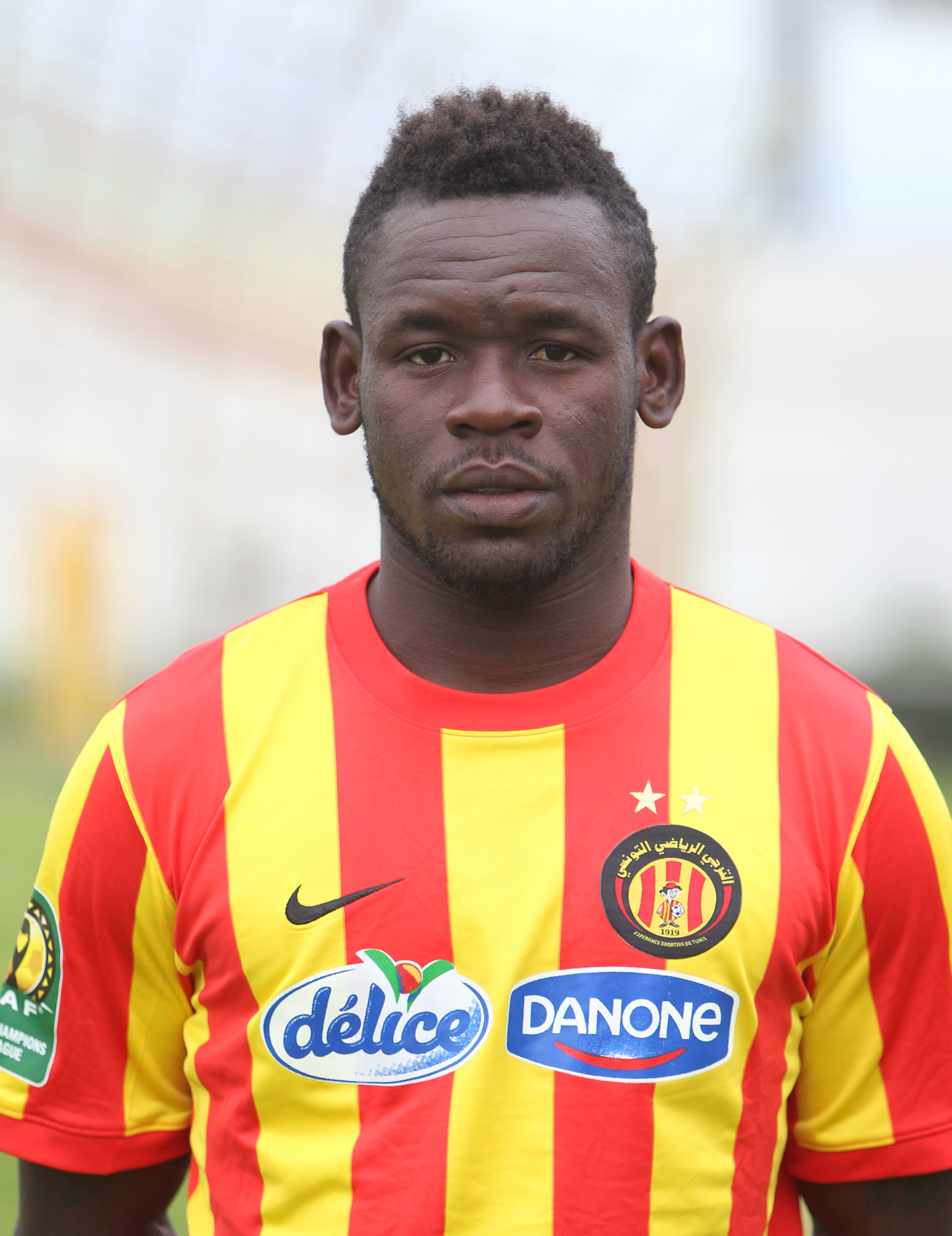

Personal information
- Full name: Emmanuel Atukwei Clottey
- Date of birth: 30 August 1987 (age 39)
- Place of birth: Accra, Greater Accra, Ghana
- Height: 1.78 m (5 ft 10 in)
- Position: Forward

Team information
- Current team: Asante Kotoko
- Number: 9

Youth career
- Brazil Academy
- Mighty Victory Sporting Club

Senior career*
Years	Team	Apps	(Gls)
2004–2009	Great Olympics	–	(–)
2007	→ Wacker Innsbruck (loan)	5	(0)
2008	→ OB (loan)	0	(0)
2009	Eleven Wise	–	(–)
2010	Tema Youth	–	(–)
2010–2012	Berekum Chelsea	–	(–)
2012–2015	Espérance de Tunis	6	(1)
2013–2014	→ Al Dhafra (loan)	12	(4)
2015	Asante Kotoko SC	–	(–)
- Accra Great Olympics F.C.

International career^{‡}
2006	Ghana U-20		
2007	Ghana U-23		
2010–	Ghana	9	(0)
- * Club domestic league appearances and goals ‡ National team caps and goals as of 18 January 2014

Emmanuel Atukwei Clottey (born 30 August 1987) is a Ghanaian professional footballer, who currently plays for Accra Great Olympics F.C. and the Ghana national team.

== Career ==
Clottey began his career with Brazil Academy and then later joined Mighty Victory Sporting Club, before signing with Great Olympics in 2004.

In 2007, Clottey was top goal scorer of the Ghana Premier League and moved in January on a 6-month loan to Austrian Football Bundesliga club FC Wacker Innsbruck, his first club in Europe. Clottey then joined OB on loan and made his debut as a substitute against FC Amager in the Ekstra bladet cup. He later returned to Great Olympics in January 2009 then again signed a contract on 9 April 2009 with Eleven Wise. In June 2010, Clottey joined Berekum Chelsea.

On 12 September 2012, after impressing in the 2012 CAF Champions League, Tunisian club Espérance de Tunis reached a deal with Berekum Chelsea to sign Clottey to a three-year contract, for an estimated transfer fee of $1.5 million.

On 18 June 2013, Clottey agreed a one-year loan move to the UAE Arabian Gulf League team Al Dhafra from Espérance. In January 2015, Clottey joined Asante Kotoko.

== Career statistics ==
As of match played on 9 February 2013.

=== International appearances ===
Appearances for Ghana
Year	Apps	Goals
2010	2	0
2011	1	0
2012	2	0
2013	4	0
Total	9	0
Correct as of 18 June 2013

== Honours/Achievements ==
=== Club ===
- Ghana Premier League: 2010–11

=== Individual ===
- Top Scorer in the Ghana Premier League with 14 goals (2007)
- Top Scorer in the CAF Champions League with 12 goals (2012)
