= Dele Olorundare =

Nigerian footballer

Dele
Personal information
- Full name: Dele Olorundare
- Date of birth: 1 December 1990 (age 35)
- Place of birth: Akure, Nigeria
- Height: 1.87 m (6 ft 1 1/2 in)
- Position: Forward

Team information
- Current team: Sunshine Stars F.C.
- Number: 28

Senior career*
Years	Team	Apps	(Gls)
2011–2013	Sunshine Stars F.C.	35	(21)
2013–2014	TKİ Tavşanlı Linyitspor (loan)	15	(1)
2014–	Sunshine Stars F.C.	69	(42)
- * Club domestic league appearances and goals

Dele Olorundare (born 1 December 1990) is a Nigerian football player who plays for Sunshine Stars F.C. He was the leading highest goal scorer in the Nigeria premier league 2013 season first leg with 13 goals in 23 games before joining the TKİ Tavşanlı Linyitspor on loan deal. Besides Nigeria, he has played in Turkey.

== Career ==
He was loan to in 2013-14 season but was withdrawn from TKİ Tavşanlı Linyitspor when the team refused to abide with the contractual agreement between them, the player and the player owner team which is Sunshine Stars F.C.
