= Cairo Military Academy Stadium =

Football stadium in Cairo, Egypt

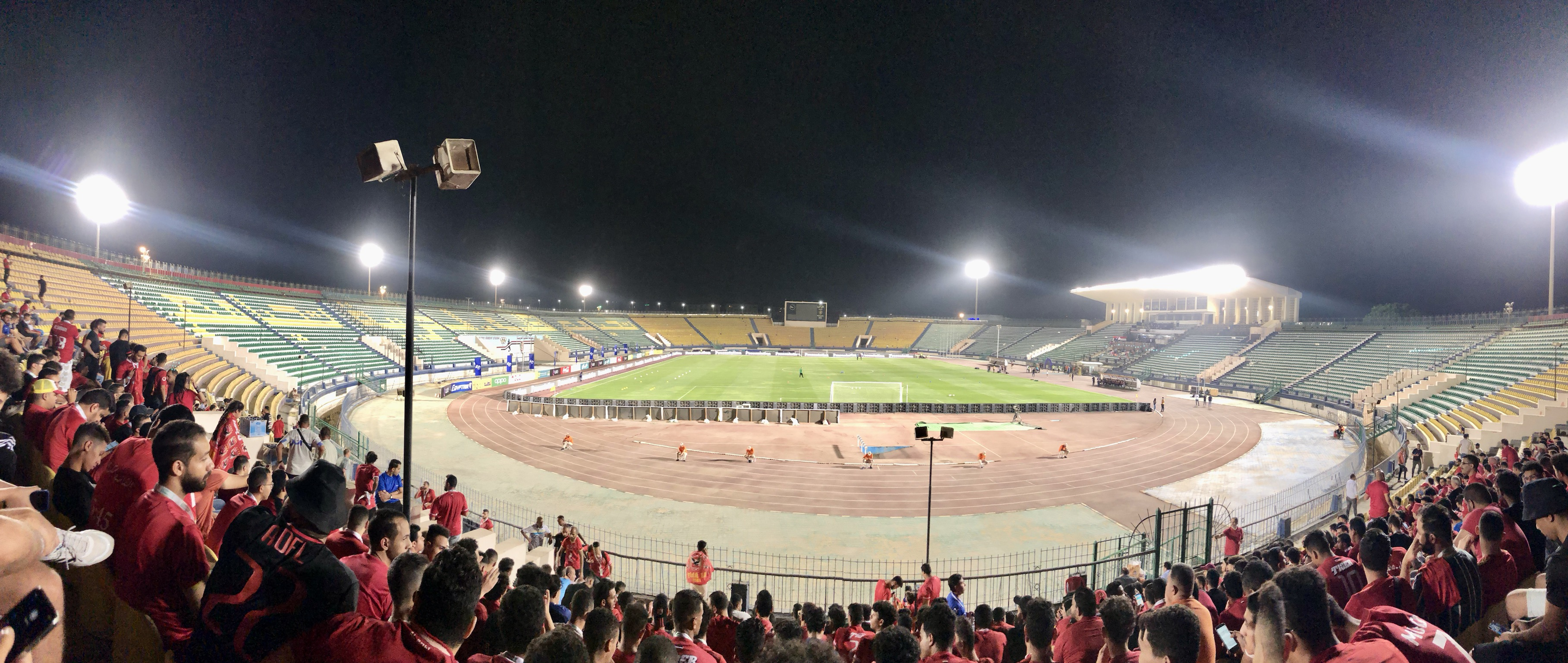
- Panorama of the Military Academy stadium before Al Ahly Vs Misr Lel Makasa match in the Egyptian premier league on 27 July 2022.
- Interactive map of Cairo Military Academy Stadium
- Location: Europe Street; Heliopolis; Cairo
- Coordinates: 30°06′40″N 31°22′03″E
- Capacity: 28,500
- Surface: Grass
- Scoreboard: Yes

Construction
- Built: 1989

The Cairo Military Academy Stadium (Arabic: إستاد الكلية الحربية بالقاهرة Istād al-Kullīyah al-Ḥarbīyah bil-Qāhira) is located in Cairo, Egypt and has a total capacity of 28,500. It was one of six stadiums used in the 2006 African Cup of Nations, held in Egypt.

Seven miles up the road from Cairo International Stadium, heading for Cairo International Airport, there is the Cairo Military Academy Stadium at the far end of Orouba Street in the north-eastern Heliopolis district of Cairo.

It was built in 1989 for the use of military teams and students at the military academy. The ground accommodated home games of Al Ahly and Zamalek during the refurbishing of the Cairo International Stadium and occasionally still serves to stage matches of the old foes.

The stadium has a small roof extension serving as a cover for the main stand. On demand, during matches rent-a-crowd military cadets serve as ground-fillers in addition to the sparse paying spectators for football matches.

== Gallery ==
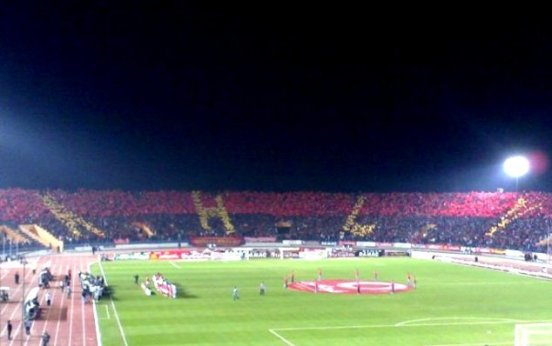
Ultras Ahlawy tefo before Al Ahly vs Zamalek match in the 2007/2008 Egyptian premier league.
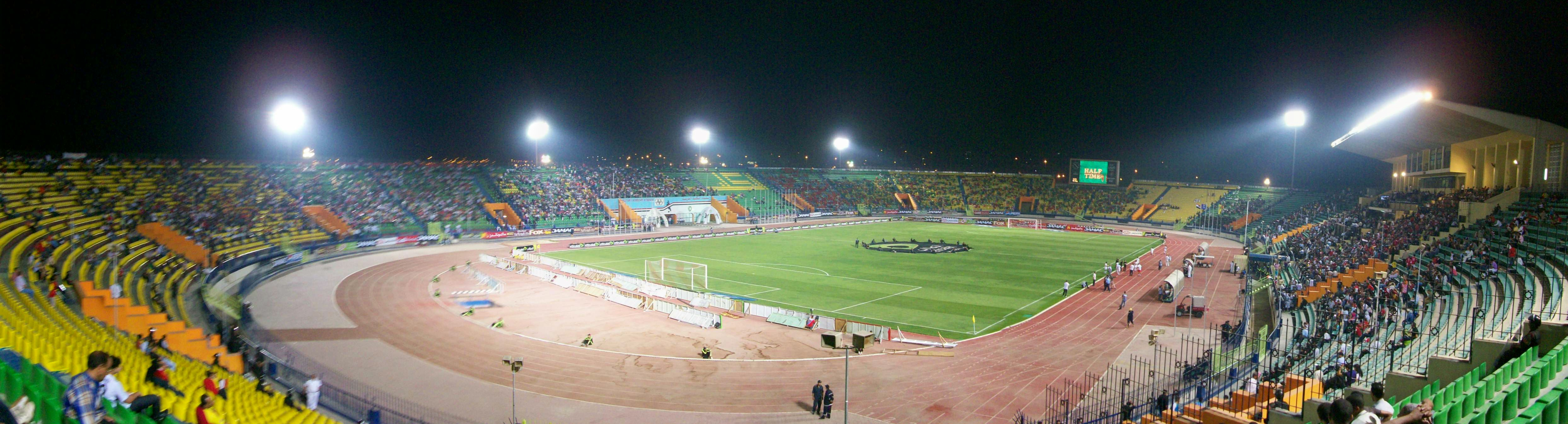
Panorama of the Military Academy stadium during a friendly international game between Egypt and Guinea on August 12, 2009.
