= Noumandiez Doué =

Ivorian football referee

Noumandiez Desiré Doué (born 29 September 1970) is an Ivorian football referee.

He became a FIFA referee in 2004. Doué has refereed in international tournaments including the 2010, 2012, and 2013 Africa Cup of Nations competitions. He has also officiated at the 2011 FIFA U-20 World Cup, the 2011 CAF Champions League Final, the 2011 FIFA Club World Cup, and qualifying matches for the 2010 and 2014 World Cups.

In 2011, Doué was named Referee of the Year by the Confederation of African Football.

Doué is the uncle of footballers Désiré and Guéla Doué.
