= El Sayed Hamdy =

Egyptian footballer (born 1984)

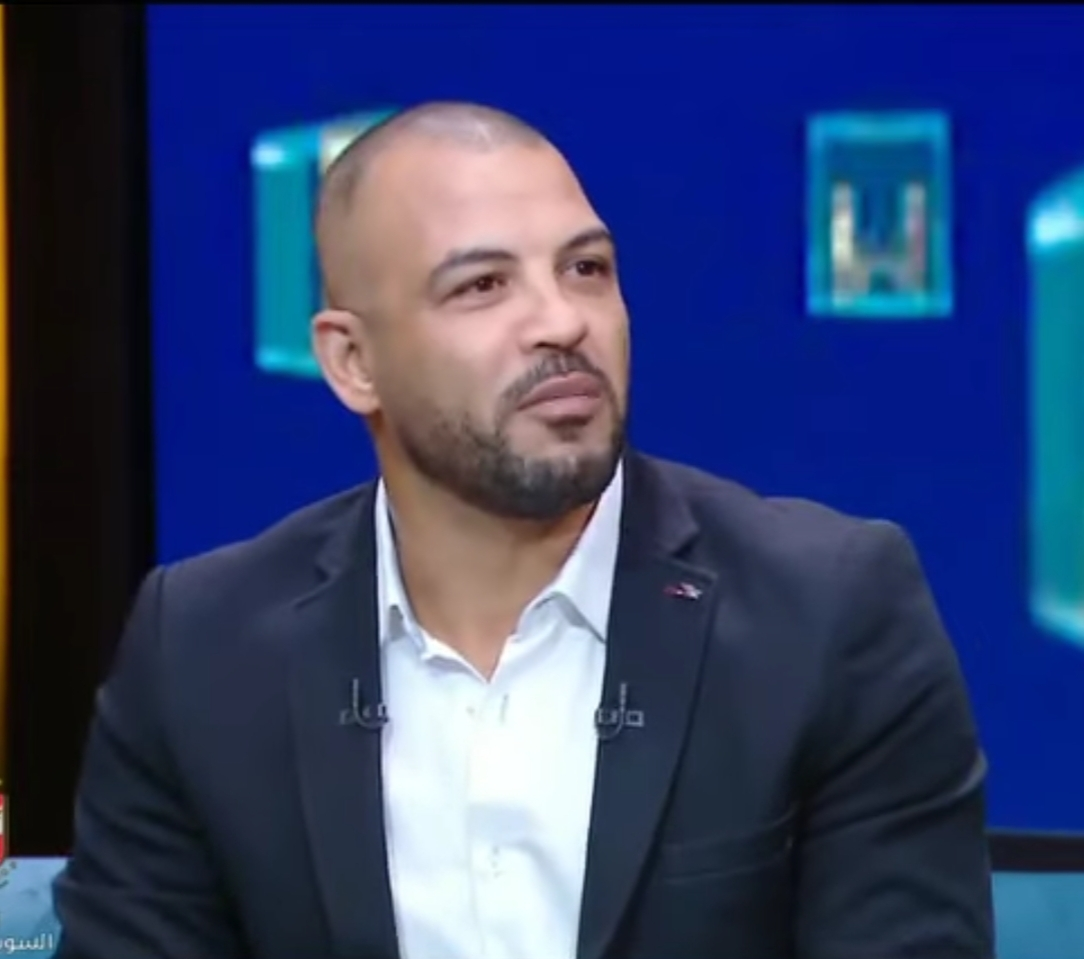
- El Sayed Hamdy in 2021

Personal information
- Full name: El Sayed Hamdy Mahdy Hewil
- Date of birth: 1 March 1984 (age 42)
- Place of birth: Egypt
- Height: 1.75 m (5 ft 9 in)
- Position: Striker

Senior career*
Years	Team	Apps	(Gls)
2004–2008	Tanta	2	(1)
2008–2011	Petrojet	69	(19)
2011–2014	Al-Ahly	61	(27)
2014–2016	Misr Lel-Makkasa		
2016–2017	Al Masry		
2017	El Dakhleya (loan)		
2017	El Mansoura		
2018–2019	Tersana		

International career^{‡}
2009–2012	Egypt	13	(7)
- * Club domestic league appearances and goals as of 00:33, 4 January 2010 (UTC) ‡ National team caps and goals as of 00:33, 1 November 2013 (UTC)

El Sayed Hamdy Hewil (Arabic: السيد حمدي) (born 1 March 1984) is an Egyptian retired football striker who played for the Egyptian national team.

He was called up for Egypt for the first time in 2009 for a friendly game against Guinea to be held in Cairo on 12 August 2009. He made his debut with Egypt in that match and played the whole match with a 92nd-minute assist for Egypt's equalizer to make it 3-3. Hamdi finished as the top scorer in the Nile Basin Tournament 2011, scoring 6 goals.
