= Walid Hichri =

Tunisian footballer

Personal information
- Full name: Walid Hichri
- Date of birth: 5 March 1986 (age 40)
- Place of birth: Aryanah, Tunisia
- Height: 1.98 m (6 ft 6 in)
- Position: Centre back

Senior career*
| Years | Team | Apps | (Gls) |
| 2004–2008 | Club Africain | 45 | (6) |
| 2008 | Saturn Ramenskoye | 0 | (0) |
| 2008–2010 | CA Bizertin | 26 | (1) |
| 2010–2013 | Espérance Tunis | 60 | (8) |
| 2013–2015 | Avenir de la Marsa | 13 | (1) |
| 2014–2015 | → Al Ahli Tripoli (loan) | | |
| 2015–2016 | Stade Tunisien | 13 | (0) |
| 2016 | FC Kyzylzhar | 7 | (0) |
| 2016–2019 | US Monastir | 41 | (2) |

International career^{‡}
| 2011–2013 | Tunisia | 14 | (1) |
- * Club domestic league appearances and goals as of 1 September 2023 ‡ National team caps and goals as of 24 October 2012

Walid Hichri (born 5 March 1986) is a Tunisian retired footballer who played as a centre back. From 2010 to 2013, he played for Espérance Sportive de Tunis in the Tunisian Ligue Professionnelle 1 as a defender.
