= Djamel Haimoudi =

Algerian football referee

- Born: December 10, 1970 (age 55); Relizane, Algeria

Domestic
| Years | League | Role |
| 2001–2014 | Algerian Ligue 1 | Referee |

International
| Years | League | Role |
| 2004–2015 | FIFA listed | Referee |

Djamel Haimoudi (Arabic: جمال حيمودي; born December 10, 1970) is an Algerian football referee. He has been a FIFA listed international referee since 2004.

== Career ==
Haimoudi was born in Relizane. He was a referee at the 2008 Africa Cup of Nations, the 2011 FIFA U-20 World Cup and the 2012 Africa Cup of Nations. He has also refereed a number of CAF Champions League matches, as well as FIFA World Cup qualifiers.

In December 2012, he was selected by the Confederation of African Football as the African Referee of the Year at the 2012 CAF Awards in Accra, Ghana. Two months later, he was appointed as the referee of the 2013 Africa Cup of Nations Final between Nigeria and Burkina Faso and also officiated the 2013 FIFA Confederations Cup play-off for third place between Uruguay and Italy.

== Statistics ==
=== Games and cards in Ligue Professionnelle 1 ===
| Season | Games | Total (yellow card) | (yellow card) per game | Total (red card) | (red card) per game |
|---|---|---|---|---|---|
| 2001–02 | 0 | 0 | 0.0 | 0 | 0.0 |
| 2002–03 | 0 | 0 | 0.0 | 0 | 0.0 |
| 2003–04 | 0 | 0 | 0.0 | 0 | 0.0 |
| 2004–05 | 0 | 0 | 0.0 | 0 | 0.0 |
| 2005–06 | 0 | 0 | 0.0 | 0 | 0.0 |
| 2006–07 | 0 | 0 | 0.0 | 0 | 0.0 |
| 2007–08 | 0 | 0 | 0.0 | 0 | 0.0 |
| 2008–09 | 0 | 0 | 0.0 | 0 | 0.0 |
| 2009–10 | 0 | 0 | 0.0 | 0 | 0.0 |
| 2010–11 | 11 | 48 | 4.36 | 4 | 0.36 |
| 2011–12 | 4 | 19 | 4.75 | 0 | 0 |
| 2012–13 | 8 | 36 | 4.5 | 1 | 0.12 |
| 2013–14 | 11 | 47 | 4.27 | 5 | 0.45 |

== Matches ==
- 2014 FIFA World Cup
  - Australia vs Netherlands (group stage)
  - Costa Rica vs England (group stage)
  - Belgium vs United States (round of 16)
  - Brazil vs Netherlands (match for third place)
- 2013 FIFA Confederations Cup
  - Spain vs Tahiti (group stage)
  - Uruguay vs Italy (match for third place)
- 2013 Africa Cup of Nations
  - South Africa vs Cape Verde (group stage)
  - DR Congo vs Mali (group stage)
  - Ivory Coast vs Nigeria (quarterfinals)
  - Nigeria vs Burkina Faso (final)
- 2012 FIFA Club World Cup
  - Sanfrecce Hiroshima vs Auckland City (play-off for quarter-finals)
- 2012 Africa Cup of Nations
  - Ghana vs Mali (group stage)
  - Gabon vs Mali (quarterfinals)
- 2011 FIFA U-20 World Cup
  - Australia vs Ecuador (group stage)
  - Mexico vs England (group stage)
  - Portugal vs Guatemala (round of 16)
- 2008 Africa Cup of Nations
  - Ivory Coast vs Guinea (quarter-finals)
