= Sunshine Stars F.C. =

Nigerian football club

Sunshine Stars
- Full name: Sunshine Stars Football Club
- Nicknames: The Owena Waves, Akure Gunners
- Founded: 1995
- Ground: Akure Township Stadium; Akure, Ondo, Nigeria
- Capacity: 2,806
- Chairman: Wayne Olusegun
- Manager: Abubakar Bala
- League: Nigeria Professional Football League
- 2025–26: Nigeria National League, 5th of 10 (Conference A)
- Website: www.sunshinefc.com
Home colours	Away colours

Sunshine Stars Football Club is a Nigerian professional football club based in Akure. They play in the top division in Nigerian football, the Nigerian Premier League. Their home stadium is the 5,000-capacity Akure Township Stadium. Sunshine Stars FC are funded and sponsored by the Ondo State Government.

== Achievements ==
- National Division One (Second Level): 2

2001, 2007

== Performance in CAF competitions ==
- CAF Champions League: 1 appearance

2012 – Semi-finals

- CAF Confederation Cup: 1 appearance

2011 – Semi-finals

- West African Club Championship (UFOA Cup): 1 appearance

2009 – First Round

== Notable coaches ==
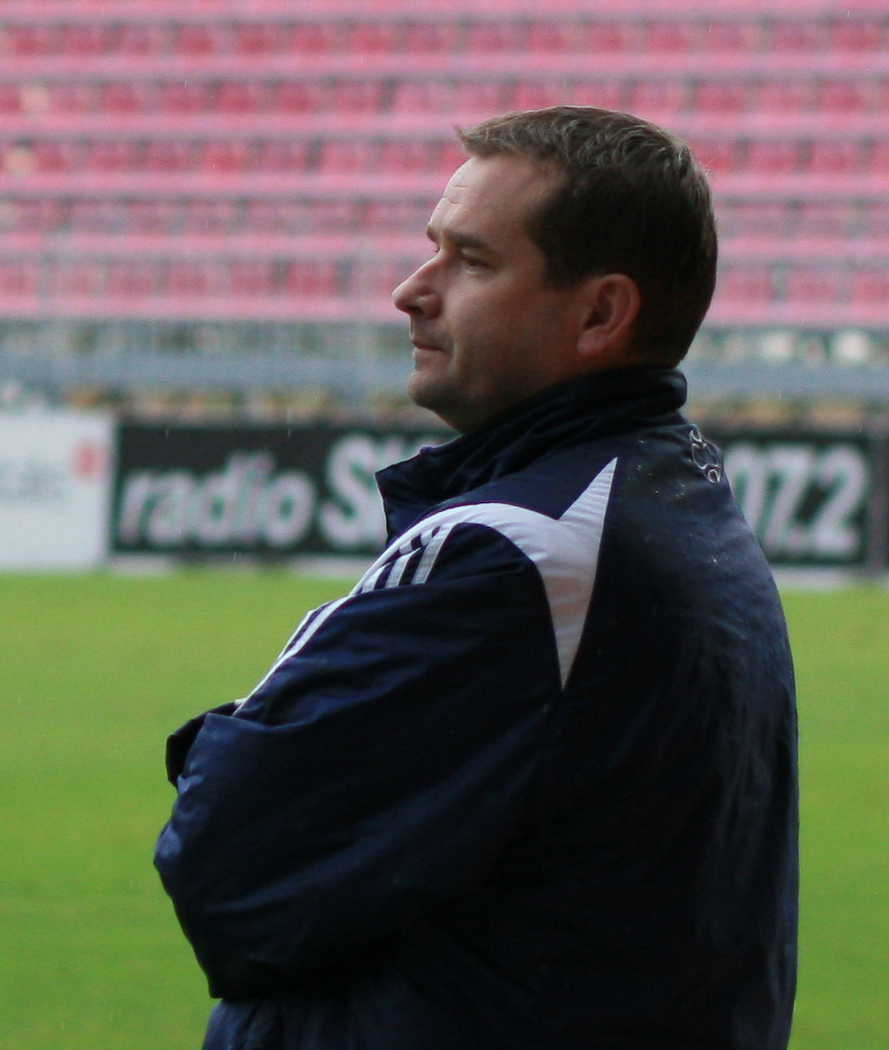
Paul Ashworth became the manager of the Sunshine Stars in 2015

- (Nigeria) Kadiri Ikhana (2000)
- (Argentina) Rodolfo Zapata (2010)
- (England) Paul Ashworth (2015)
- (Nigeria) Augustine Eguavoen (2017)
- (Nigeria) Adeyeni Joseph (2018)
- (Nigeria) Daramola Nicholas Akinsehinwa (2013–2016)

== Notable players ==
- (Nigeria) Dayo Ojo
- (Nigeria) Godfrey Oboabona
