= 2011 CAF Champions League qualifying rounds =

- Dates: 28 January – 6 March 2011

This page provides the summaries of the matches of the qualifying rounds for the group stage of the 2011 CAF Champions League.

The schedule for the tournament was released in October 2010, and the draw for all three rounds was held in Cairo on 20 December 2010.

Qualification ties were decided over two legs, with aggregate goals used to determine the winner. If the sides were level on aggregate after the second leg, the away goals rule applied, and if still level, the tie proceeded directly to a penalty shootout (no extra time is played).

== Preliminary round ==
This was a knock-out stage of the 46 teams that did not receive byes to the first round.

First legs: 28–30 January 2011; Second legs: 11–13, 25–27 February and 4–6 March 2011.

29 January 2011
16:30 UTC+01:00

ASFAN (Niger)	0 – 0	(Ivory Coast) JC Abidjan

Stade Général Seyni Kountché, Niamey
27 February 2011
15:30 UTC±00:00

JC Abidjan (Ivory Coast)	3 – 0	(Niger) ASFAN
Laciné Traoré 36'; Djémory Coulibaly 55'; Hamadou Diabaté 57'	Report

Stade Robert Champroux, Abidjan

JC Abidjan won 3–0 on aggregate and advanced to the first round.

30 January 2011
15:30 UTC+01:00

Saint Michel d'Ouenzé (Republic of the Congo)	0 – 1	(Nigeria) Enyimba
	Report	Nnaemeka Anyanwu 40'

Stade Alphonse Massemba-Débat, Brazzaville
13 February 2011
16:00 UTC+01:00

Enyimba (Nigeria)	2 – 0	(Republic of the Congo) Saint Michel d'Ouenzé
John Lawrence 17'; Victor Barnabas 45'	Report

Enyimba International Stadium, Aba

Enyimba won 3–0 on aggregate and advanced to the first round.

30 January 2011
14:00 UTC+01:00

US Bitam (Gabon)	0 – 0	(Cameroon) Les Astres

Stade Gaston Peyrille, Bitam
5 March 2011
15:00 UTC+01:00

Les Astres (Cameroon)	0 – 0	(Gabon) US Bitam
Penalties
	3 – 5

Stade de la Réunification, Douala

Aggregate 0–0. US Bitam won the penalty shootout and advanced to the first round.

30 January 2011
16:00 UTC+01:00

Olympic Real de Bangui (Central African Republic)	1 – 1	(Algeria) MC Alger
Nicaise Kelebona 90+2'	Report	Abdelmalek Mokdad 28'

Barthelemy Boganda Stadium, Bangui
11 February 2011
16:00 UTC+01:00

MC Alger (Algeria)	2 – 0	(Central African Republic) Olympic Real de Bangui
Nassim Bouchema 23'; Mohamed Derrag 51'	Report

Stade Mabrouki Salem, Rouïba

MC Alger won 3–1 on aggregate and advanced to the first round.

Interclube (Angola)	w/o	(Botswana) Township Rollers

Interclube advanced to the first round after Township Rollers withdrew.

30 January 2011
15:00 UTC±00:00

East End Lions (Sierra Leone)	0 – 2	(Mali) Djoliba
		Alou Bagayoko 66', 82'

Brookfields National Stadium, Freetown
5 March 2011
16:30 UTC±00:00

Djoliba (Mali)	2 – 0	(Sierra Leone) East End Lions
Ousmane Cissé 32'; Amadou Karembé 80'

Complex Sportif Hérémakono, Bamako

Djoliba won 4–0 on aggregate and advanced to the first round.

30 January 2011
16:00 UTC±00:00

Diaraf (Senegal)	1 – 1	(The Gambia) Ports Authority
Ibrahima Ndoye 88'	Report	Hatab Badji 51'

Stade Demba Diop, Dakar
12 February 2011
16:30 UTC±00:00

Ports Authority (The Gambia)	0 – 2	(Senegal) Diaraf
		Babacar Ndiour 32'; Pape Maka Sarr 82'

Serrekunda East Mini-Stadium, Serrekunda

Diaraf won 3–1 on aggregate and advanced to the first round.

30 January 2011
16:00 UTC+01:00

ASPAC (Benin)	1 – 0	(Equatorial Guinea) Deportivo Mongomo
Hyacinthe Sèwanou 32'	Report

Stade René Pleven d'Akpakpa, Cotonou
12 February 2011
15:30 UTC+01:00

Deportivo Mongomo (Equatorial Guinea)	1 – 1	(Benin) ASPAC
Junior 13'		William Dassagaté 37'

Estadio La Libertad, Bata

ASPAC won 2–1 on aggregate and advanced to the first round.

30 January 2011
16:00 UTC±00:00

ASEC Mimosas (Ivory Coast)	7 – 0	(Mauritania) CF Cansado
Robert Sankara 3'; Patrick N'doua 15'; Adama Bakayoko 21', 28', 84'; Zahui Okou 77'; Jean Imère Yao Krizo 87'	Report

Stade Robert Champroux, Abidjan
26 February 2011
16:30 UTC±00:00

CF Cansado (Mauritania)	0 – 2	(Ivory Coast) ASEC Mimosas
	Report	Jean Jacques Bougouhi 37'; Antoine N'Gossan 87'

Stade Olympique, Nouakchott

ASEC Mimosas won 9–0 on aggregate and advanced to the first round.

30 January 2011
15:00 UTC+02:00

Motor Action (Zimbabwe)	0 – 1	(Madagascar) CNaPS Sport
	Report	Yvan Rajoarimanana 90'

Rufaro Stadium, Harare
13 February 2011
14:30 UTC+03:00

CNaPS Sport (Madagascar)	0 – 1	(Zimbabwe) Motor Action
		Kudakwashe Musharu 80'
Penalties
	3 – 4

Mahamasina Municipal Stadium, Antananarivo

Aggregate 1–1. Motor Action won the penalty shootout and advanced to the first round.

28 January 2011
20:00 UTC±00:00

Raja CA (Morocco)	10 – 1	(Chad) Tourbillon
Abdessamad Ouhakki 10'; Hassan Tair 13', 29', 50'; Ismail Belmaalem 19'; Bouchaib El Moubarki 25'; Mohsine Moutouali 33'; Hicham Aboucherouane 63'; Lanciné Koné 68'; Hassan Souari 82'	Report	Habib Mahamat 67'

Stade Mohamed V, Casablanca

Tourbillon (Chad)	w/o	(Morocco) Raja CA

Raja CA advanced to the first round after Tourbillon withdrew after the first leg.

29 January 2011
16:00 UTC+03:00

Ulinzi Stars (Kenya)	0 – 4	(Egypt) Zamalek
	Report	Mahmoud Fathalla 61' (pen.); Hassan Mostafa 69'; Mohamed Amine Aoudia 76'; Ibrahim Salah 90+1'

Nyayo National Stadium, Nairobi
27 February 2011
17:30 UTC+02:00

Zamalek (Egypt)	1 – 0	(Kenya) Ulinzi Stars
Shikabala 58'	Report

Cairo Military Academy Stadium, Cairo

Zamalek won 5–0 on aggregate and advanced to the first round.

29 January 2011
15:30 UTC+02:00

APR (Rwanda)	2 – 2	(Tunisia) Club Africain
Alfred Ngabo 43'; Eugene Twite 75' (pen.)	Report	Khaled Melliti 16'; Hamza Messaadi 44'

Stade Amahoro, Kigali
4 March 2011
15:00 UTC+01:00

Club Africain (Tunisia)	4 – 0	(Rwanda) APR
Bilel Ifa 20'; Wissem Ben Yahia 49' (pen.); Ezechiel Ndouassel 73'; Youssef Mouihbi 75'	Report

Olympic Stadium, Tunis

Club Africain won 6–2 on aggregate and advanced to the first round.

30 January 2011
15:00 UTC+01:00

Recreativo Caála (Angola)	2 – 0	(Ethiopia) Saint-George SA
Paizinho 28', 71'

Estádio dos Kuricutelas, Huambo
13 February 2011
16:00 UTC+03:00

Saint-George SA (Ethiopia)	1 – 0	(Angola) Recreativo Caála
Adane Girma 28'

Addis Ababa Stadium, Addis Abeba

Recreativo Caála won 2–1 on aggregate and advanced to the first round.

29 January 2011
15:00 UTC+03:00

Élan Club (Comoros)	0 – 0	(Tanzania) Simba

Stade de Beaumer, Moroni
12 February 2011
16:00 UTC+03:00

Simba (Tanzania)	4 – 2	(Comoros) Élan Club
Mbwana Samata 45', 56'; Patrick Ochan 47'; Amri Kiemba 71'	Report	Madaha Mohamed 43'; Abdoulkarim Sandjema 63'

Uhuru Stadium, Dar-es-Salaam

Simba won 4–2 on aggregate and advanced to the first round.

30 January 2011
16:00 UTC±00:00

Mighty Barrolle (Liberia)	1 – 2	(Nigeria) Kano Pillars
Harris Jimmy 80'	Report	Morris Chigozie 26'; Sheriff Isa 80'

Doris Williams Stadium, Buchanan
12 February 2011
16:00 UTC+01:00

Kano Pillars (Nigeria)	1 – 0	(Liberia) Mighty Barrolle
Gambo Mohammed 29'	Report

Sani Abacha Stadium, Kano

Kano Pillars won 3–1 on aggregate and advance to the first round.

30 January 2011
17:00 UTC±00:00

Wydad AC (Morocco)	3 – 0	(Ghana) Aduana Stars
Abderahim Benkhajjan 8'; Mouhcine Iajour 18', 43'

Stade Mohamed V, Casablanca
27 February 2011
15:00 UTC±00:00

Aduana Stars (Ghana)	1 – 0	(Morocco) Wydad AC
Bernard Dong Bortey 35' (pen.)	Report

Agyeman Badu Stadium, Dormaa Ahenkro

Wydad AC won 3–1 on aggregate and advanced to the first round.

30 January 2011
16:30 UTC±00:00

Fello Star (Guinea)	1 – 1	(Burkina Faso) ASFA Yennenga
Diallo Alpha Bacar 60'	Report	Aly Babo 4'

Stade Régional Saifoullaye Diallo, Labé
12 February 2011
16:00 UTC±00:00

ASFA Yennenga (Burkina Faso)	3 – 0	(Guinea) Fello Star
Issa Gouo 12'; Solomon Asante 41'; Abasse Bundu 69'

Stade du 4-Août, Ouagadougou

ASFA Yennenga won 4–1 on aggregate and advanced to the first round.

30 January 2011
15:30 UTC+02:00

Vital'O (Burundi)	2 – 2	(Cameroon) Coton Sport
Amissi Tambwe 20'; Sutche Wambo 25'		Jacques Haman 41'; Osmaila Baba 73'

Prince Louis Rwagasore Stadium, Bujumbura
6 March 2011
15:00 UTC+01:00

Coton Sport (Cameroon)	1 – 1	(Burundi) Vital'O
Jacques Haman 31'	Report	Alain Ndizeye 58'

Stade Omnisports Roumde-Adja, Garoua

Aggregate 3–3. Coton Sport advanced on the away goals rule to the first round.

30 January 2011
20:30 UTC+03:00

Zanzibar Ocean View	1 – 1	(Democratic Republic of the Congo) AS Vita Club
Nelson Lukong 88' (o.g.)		Alfred M'Fongang 76'

Amaan Stadium, Zanzibar City
27 February 2011
15:30 UTC+01:00

AS Vita Club (Democratic Republic of the Congo)	3 – 0	Zanzibar Ocean View
Yves Magola Mapanda 42'; Alfred M'Fongang 70', 89'	Report

Stade des Martyrs, Kinshasa

AS Vita Club won 4–1 on aggregate and advanced to the first round.

30 January 2011
15:30 UTC+02:00

Supersport United (South Africa)	2 – 0	(Lesotho) Matlama
Jabulani Maluleke 59'; Tebogo Langerman 73'	Report

Peter Mokaba Stadium, Polokwane
13 February 2011
15:00 UTC+02:00

Matlama (Lesotho)	2 – 1	(South Africa) Supersport United
Litsepe Marabe 55'; Motlalepula Chabeli 59'	Report	Fikru Lemessa 19'

Setsoto Stadium, Maseru

Supersport United won 3–2 on aggregate and advanced to the first round.

30 January 2011
15:00 UTC+02:00

Young Buffaloes (Eswatini)	3 – 0	(Seychelles) St Michel United
Vusi Thumbatha 5'; Ndoda Mthethwa 59'; Sibusiso Dlamini 67'

Mavuso Sports Centre, Manzini
13 February 2011
16:30 UTC+04:00

St Michel United (Seychelles)	2 – 1	(Eswatini) Young Buffaloes
Alex Nibourette 30'; Nestor Benohavy 73'	Report	Sibuiso Dlamini 45'

Stade Linité, Victoria

Young Buffaloes won 4–2 on aggregate and advanced to the first round.

29 January 2011
15:00 UTC+02:00

ZESCO United (Zambia)	3 – 0	(Mozambique) Liga Muçulmana
Humprey Luputa 6'; Jackson Mwanza 21'; Portipher Zulu 81'

Arthur Davies Stadium, Kitwe
12 February 2011
15:00 UTC+02:00

Liga Muçulmana (Mozambique)	2 – 1	(Zambia) ZESCO United
Manuel Mablango 25'; Dário Monteiro 69'	Report	Portipher Zulu 37'

Estádio Da Liga Muçulmana, Matola

ZESCO United won 4–2 on aggregate and advanced to the first round.

== First round ==
This was a knock-out stage of 32 teams; the 23 teams advancing from the preliminary round, and 9 teams that received byes into this round.

First legs: 18–20 March 2011; Second legs: 1–3 April 2011.

JC Abidjan (Ivory Coast)	w/o	(Libya) Al-Ittihad

Al-Ittihad advanced to the second round after JC Abidjan withdrew. Tie was scheduled to be played over one leg at a neutral venue (at Bamako, Mali on 3 April 2011) due to the political situations in Côte d'Ivoire and Libya, but match did not take place.

20 March 2011
14:00 UTC+01:00

US Bitam (Gabon)	0 – 0	(Nigeria) Enyimba

Stade Gaston Peyrille, Bitam
3 April 2011
16:00 UTC+01:00

Enyimba (Nigeria)	2 – 1	(Gabon) US Bitam
Victor Barnabas 53' (pen.); Josiah Maduabuchi 90+7'	Report	Serge Patrick Beh Za'a 30'

Enyimba International Stadium, Aba

Enyimba won 2–1 on aggregate and advanced to the second round.

20 March 2011
15:00 UTC+02:00

Dynamos (Zimbabwe)	4 – 1	(Algeria) MC Alger
Guthrie Zhokinyi 17'; Roderick Mutuma 45+2'; Denver Mukamba 76'; Farai Vimisai 83'	Report	Réda Babouche 88'

Rufaro Stadium, Harare
3 April 2011
19:00 UTC+01:00

MC Alger (Algeria)	3 – 0	(Zimbabwe) Dynamos
Brahim Bedbouda 41', 90'; Abdelmalek Mokdad 76' (pen.)	Report

Omar Hammadi Stadium, Algiers

Aggregate 4–4. MC Alger advanced on the away goals rule to the second round.

19 March 2011
20:00 UTC+03:00

Al-Merreikh (Sudan)	2 – 0	(Angola) Interclube
Mohamed Osman Hanno 16'; Faisal Agab 86'

Al Merreikh Stadium, Omdurman
2 April 2011
15:30 UTC+01:00

Interclube (Angola)	2 – 0	(Sudan) Al-Merreikh
Manucho Barros 15'; Pedro Henriques 40' (pen.)
Penalties
	3 – 2

Estádio 22 de Junho, Luanda

Aggregate 2–2. Interclube won on penalties and advanced to the second round.

20 March 2011
17:00 UTC±00:00

Diaraf (Senegal)	3 – 0	(Mali) Djoliba
Djibril Sidibé 7', 69'; Ibrahima N'Doye 42'

Stade Demba Diop, Dakar
2 April 2011
17:00 UTC±00:00

Djoliba (Mali)	1 – 1	(Senegal) Diaraf
Moussa Diallo 58'	Report	Moussa N'Diaye 72'

Complex Sportif Hérémakono, Bamako

Diaraf won 4–1 on aggregate and advanced to the second round.

19 March 2011
16:00 UTC+01:00

Espérance ST (Tunisia)	5 – 0	(Benin) ASPAC
Youssef Msakni 8', 15'; Dramane Traoré 12'; Singbo Maxim 25' (o.g.); Oussama Darragi 32'

Olympic Stadium, Tunis
3 April 2011
16:00 UTC+01:00

ASPAC (Benin)	2 – 0	(Tunisia) Espérance ST
Adam Wahidi 38'; Moukaïla Bouraïma 76'

Stade René Pleven d'Akpakpa, Cotonou

Espérance ST won 5–2 on aggregate and advanced to the second round.

19 March 2011
15:00 UTC+02:00

Motor Action (Zimbabwe)	0 – 0	(Ivory Coast) ASEC Mimosas
Penalties
	2 – 4

Rufaro Stadium, Harare

ASEC Mimosas won on penalties and advanced to the second round. Tie played over one leg due to the political situation in Côte d'Ivoire.

19 March 2011
16:30 UTC±00:00

Stade Malien (Mali)	2 – 1	(Morocco) Raja CA
Mamadou Coulibaly 44', 54'	Report	Bouchaib El Moubarki 7'

Stade Modibo Kéïta, Bamako
2 April 2011
20:00 UTC+01:00

Raja CA (Morocco)	1 – 0	(Mali) Stade Malien
Mamadou Baila Traoré 40'	Report

Stade Mohamed V, Casablanca

Aggregate 2–2. Raja CA advanced on the away goals rule to the second round.

20 March 2011
15:30 UTC+01:00

Club Africain (Tunisia)	4 – 2	(Egypt) Zamalek
Ezechiel Ndouassel 3'; Youssef Mouihbi 46'; Karim Aouadhi 53'; Bilel Ifa 86'		Shikabala 30'; Ahmed Gaafar 79'

Olympic Stadium, Tunis
2 April 2011
16:00 UTC+02:00

Zamalek (Egypt)	Match abandoned	(Tunisia) Club Africain
Mahmoud Fathallah 29'; Hussein Yasser 45+2'	Report	Wissem Ben Yahia 38'

Cairo International Stadium, Cairo

Second leg abandoned on 90+5 minutes with Zamalek leading 2–1 (Club Africain leading 5–4 on aggregate) when Zamalek fans invaded the pitch. Club Africain advanced to the second round.

20 March 2011
20:00 UTC+03:00

Al-Hilal (Sudan)	3 – 0	(Angola) Recreativo Caála
Osama Ali Eltaawon 22'; Mudathir Eltaib 55', 80'

Al-Hilal Stadium, Omdurman
2 April 2011
16:00 UTC+01:00

Recreativo Caála (Angola)	1 – 1	(Sudan) Al-Hilal
Paizinho 28'		Edward Sadomba 68'

Estádio dos Kuricutelas, Huambo

Al-Hilal won 4–1 on aggregate and advanced to the second round.

20 March 2011
15:30 UTC+02:00

TP Mazembe (Democratic Republic of the Congo)	3 – 1	(Tanzania) Simba
Milota Kabangu 11'; Narcisse Ekanga 30'; Dioko Kaluyituka 64'	Report	Emmanuel Okwi 75'

Stade Frederic Kibassa Maliba, Lubumbashi
3 April 2011
15:30 UTC+03:00

Simba (Tanzania)	2 – 3	(Democratic Republic of the Congo) TP Mazembe
Shija Mkina 59'; Mbwana Samata 68'		Given Singuluma 17'; Dioko Kaluyituka 64', 72'

Benjamin Mkapa National Stadium, Dar-es-Salaam

TP Mazembe won 6–3 on aggregate and advanced to the second round, but were later disqualified for fielding an ineligible player. As a result, Simba played against Moroccan side Wydad AC, which lost to TP Mazembe in the second round, in a play-off for a place in the group stage.

20 March 2011
19:00 UTC±00:00

Wydad AC (Morocco)	2 – 0	(Nigeria) Kano Pillars
Fabrice N'Guessi 8', 84'

Stade Mohamed V, Casablanca
3 April 2011
14:00 UTC+01:00

Kano Pillars (Nigeria)	0 – 0	(Morocco) Wydad AC
	Report

Sani Abacha Stadium, Kano, Nigeria

Wydad AC won 2–0 on aggregate and advanced to the second round.

19 March 2011
19:00 UTC+01:00

ES Sétif (Algeria)	2 – 0	(Burkina Faso) ASFA Yennenga
Nabil Hemani 8'; Lazhar Hadj Aïssa 47'	Report

Stade 8 Mai 1945, Sétif
3 April 2011
15:30 UTC±00:00

ASFA Yennenga (Burkina Faso)	3 – 4	(Algeria) ES Sétif
Ali Zoungrana 49'; Ocansey Mandela 66' (pen.); Mamadou Zongo 80'		Nabil Hemani 26', 78'; Lazhar Hadj Aïssa 45'; Abderahmane Hachoud 90+5'

Stade du 4-Août, Ouagadougou

ES Sétif won 6–3 on aggregate and advanced to the second round.

20 March 2011
15:30 UTC+01:00

AS Vita Club (Democratic Republic of the Congo)	0 – 1	(Cameroon) Coton Sport
		Hilaire Momi 3'

Stade des Martyrs, Kinshasa
3 April 2011
15:45 UTC+01:00

Coton Sport (Cameroon)	2 – 0	(Democratic Republic of the Congo) AS Vita Club
Joel Babanda 35'; Hilaire Momi 80'	Report

Stade Omnisports Roumde-Adja, Garoua

Coton Sport won 3–0 on aggregate and advanced to the second round.

18 March 2011
17:30 UTC+02:00

Al-Ahly (Egypt)	2 – 0	(South Africa) Supersport United
Osama Hosny 3'; Dominique Da Silva 84'	Report

Cairo International Stadium, Cairo
2 April 2011
20:15 UTC+02:00

Supersport United (South Africa)	1 – 0	(Egypt) Al-Ahly
Jabulani Maluleke 28'	Report

Peter Mokaba Stadium, Polokwane

Al-Ahly won 2–1 on aggregate and advanced to the second round.

19 March 2011
15:00 UTC+02:00

ZESCO United (Zambia)	5 – 0	(Eswatini) Young Buffaloes
Alfred Luputa 5', 10', 80'; Kangwa Chileshe 15'; Nicholas Zulu 70'

Dag Hammarskjöld Stadium, Ndola
2 April 2011
16:00 UTC+02:00

Young Buffaloes (Eswatini)	0 – 2	(Zambia) ZESCO United
	Report	Kangwa Chileshe 47'; Alfred Luputa 78'

Mavuso Sports Centre, Manzini

ZESCO United won 7–0 on aggregate and advanced to the second round.

== Second round ==
This was a knock-out stage of the 16 teams that advanced from the first round; winners advanced to the group stage, with the losers advancing to the Confederation Cup play-off round.

First legs: 22–24 April 2011; Second legs 7–8 May 2011.

8 May 2011
16:00 UTC+01:00

Enyimba (Nigeria)	1 – 0	(Libya) Al-Ittihad
Victor Barnabas 66' (pen.)	Report

Enyimba International Stadium, Aba
Referee: Gassama Bakary, Gambia

Enyimba advanced to the group stage. Al-Ittihad advanced to the Confederation Cup play-off round. Tie played over one leg due to the political situation in Libya.

23 April 2011
16:00 UTC+01:00

Interclube (Angola)	1 – 1	(Algeria) MC Alger
Pedro Henriques 9'		Zinedine Bensalem 90+3'

Estádio 22 de Junho, Luanda
Attendance: 10,000
7 May 2011
19:00 UTC+01:00

MC Alger (Algeria)	3 – 2	(Angola) Interclube
Youssef Sofiane 5'; Abdelmalek Mokdad 45+2'; Brahim Bedbouda 89' (pen.)		Pedro Henriques 43', 67'

Omar Hammadi Stadium, Algiers

MC Alger won 4–3 on aggregate and advanced to the group stage. Interclube advanced to the Confederation Cup play-off round.

23 April 2011
19:10 UTC+01:00

Espérance ST (Tunisia)	5 – 0	(Senegal) Diaraf
Dramane Traore 11'; Oussama Darragi 14', 32' (pen.); Idriss Mhirsi 43'; Youssef Msakni 53'	Report

Stade El Menzah, Tunis
8 May 2011
17:00 UTC±00:00

Diaraf (Senegal)	0 – 1	(Tunisia) Espérance ST
		Roger Toindouba 40'

Stade Demba Diop, Dakar

Espérance ST won 6–0 and advanced to the group stage. Diaraf advanced to the Confederation Cup play-off round.

7 May 2011
21:00 UTC+01:00

Raja CA (Morocco)	1 – 1	(Ivory Coast) ASEC Mimosas
Mohsine Moutouali 90'		Adama Bakayoko 57'
Penalties
	5 – 4

Stade Mohamed V, Casablanca

Raja CA won on penalties and advanced to the group stage. ASEC Mimosas advanced to the Confederation Cup play-off round. Tie played over one leg due to the political situation in Côte d'Ivoire.

24 April 2011
20:00 UTC+03:00

Al-Hilal (Sudan)	1 – 0	(Tunisia) Club Africain
Edward Sadomba 73'	Report

Al-Hilal Stadium, Omdurman
7 May 2011
17:00 UTC+01:00

Club Africain (Tunisia)	Match abandoned	(Sudan) Al-Hilal
Khaled Melliti 71'		Edward Sadomba 18'

Olympic Stadium, Tunis

Second leg abandoned on 81 minutes with the score at 1–1 (Al-Hilal leading 2–1 on aggregate) when Club Africain fans invaded the pitch. Al-Hilal advanced to the group stage. Club Africain advanced to the Confederation Cup play-off round.

23 April 2011
19:30 UTC+01:00

Wydad AC (Morocco)	1 – 0	(Democratic Republic of the Congo) TP Mazembe
Mustapha Allaoui 16'	Report

Stade Mohamed V, Casablanca
Attendance: 60,000
8 May 2011
15:30 UTC+02:00

TP Mazembe (Democratic Republic of the Congo)	2 – 0	(Morocco) Wydad AC
Milota Kabangu 80'; Mbenza Bedi 90+3'

Stade Frederic Kibassa Maliba, Lubumbashi

TP Mazembe won 2–1 on aggregate and advanced to the group stage, but were later disqualified for fielding an ineligible player in the first round. As a result, Wydad AC played against Tanzanian side Simba, which lost to TP Mazembe in the first round, in a play-off for a place in the group stage.

7 May 2011
16:00 UTC+01:00

Coton Sport (Cameroon)	4 – 1	(Algeria) ES Sétif
Ambroise Oyongo Bitolo 12'; Awangue Mbongo 53'; Hilaire Momi 70'; Lassina Abdoul Karim 86'		Lazhar Hadj Aïssa 34'

Stade Omnisports Roumde-Adja, Garoua
13 May 2011
16:00 UTC+01:00

ES Sétif (Algeria)	2 – 0	(Cameroon) Coton Sport
Bouazza Feham 17' (pen.); Hocine Metref 58'	Report

Stade 8 Mai 1945, Sétif

Coton Sport won 4–3 on aggregate and advanced to the group stage. ES Sétif advanced to the Confederation Cup play-off round.

Note: First leg postponed following a request from Coton Sport who had four players in the Cameroon U-20 team playing in the 2011 African Youth Championship in South Africa.

23 April 2011
15:00 UTC+02:00

ZESCO United (Zambia)	0 – 0	(Egypt) Al-Ahly
	Report

Dag Hammarskjöld Stadium, Ndola
8 May 2011
20:00 UTC+02:00

Al-Ahly (Egypt)	1 – 0	(Zambia) ZESCO United
Mohamed Barakat 66'	Report

Cairo International Stadium, Cairo

Al-Ahly won 1–0 on aggregate and advanced to the group stage. ZESCO United advanced to the Confederation Cup play-off round.

== Special play-off ==
On 14 May 2011, the CAF announced that TP Mazembe from Congo DR were disqualified from the Champions League group stage following a complaint about the eligibility of TP Mazembe's player Janvier Besala Bokungu from Tanzanian side Simba, which lost to them in the first round. As a result, the Organising Committee decided that a replacement for the group stage would be determined by a play-off match at a neutral venue, between Simba and Moroccan side Wydad AC, which lost to TP Mazembe in the second round.

28 May 2011
18:00 UTC+02:00

Wydad AC (Morocco)	3–0	(Tanzania) Simba
Fabrice N'Guessi 88'; Ayoub El Khaliqi 90+4'; Mouhcine Iajour 90+6'	Report

Petro Sport Stadium, Cairo (Egypt)

Wydad AC advanced to the group stage. Simba advanced to the Confederation Cup play-off round.
