= 2011 CAF Champions League final =

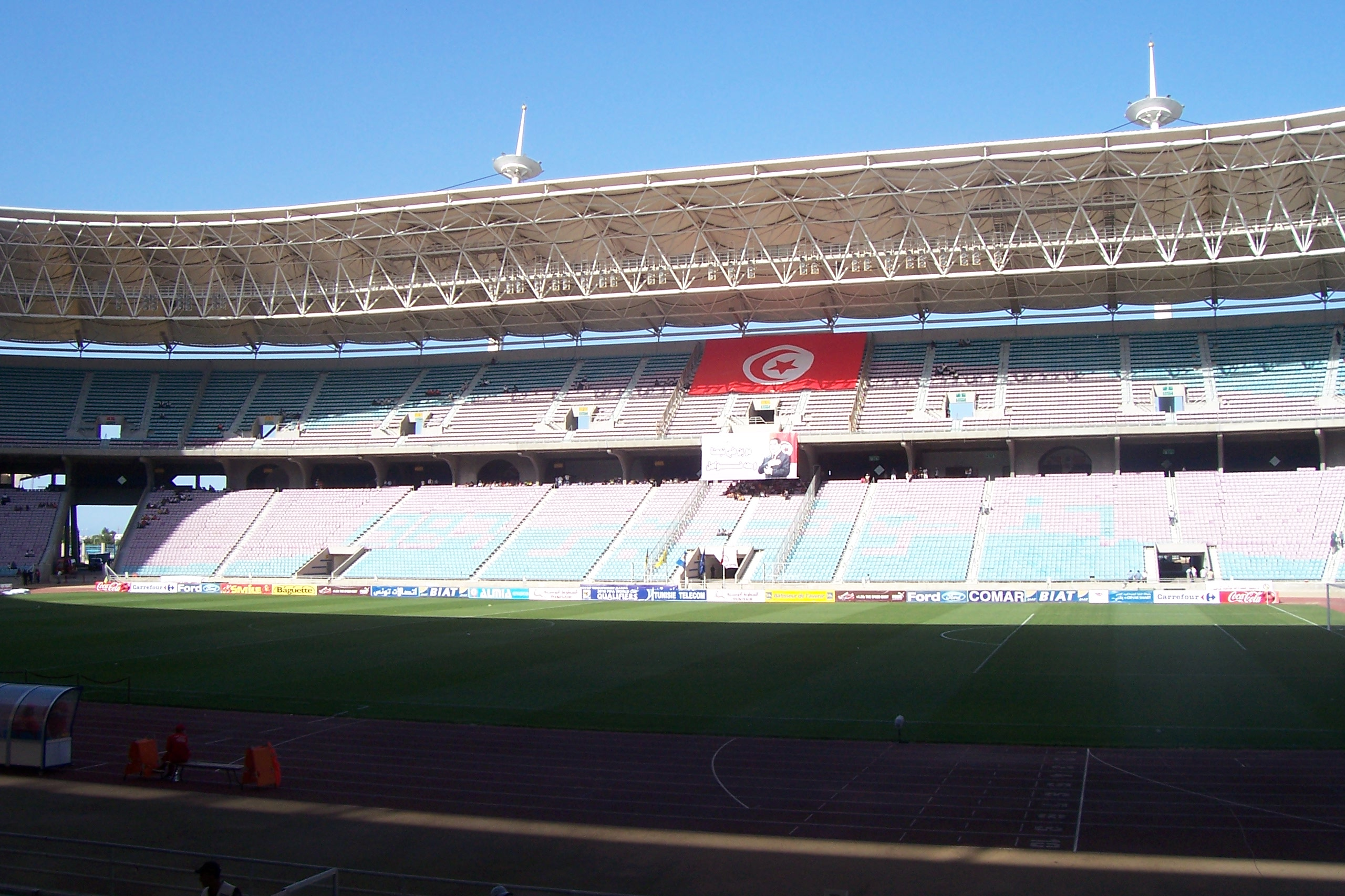
- 7 November Stadium hosted the podium where ES Tunis lifted the trophy
- Event: 2011 CAF Champions League
Wydad AC	ES Tunis
(Morocco)	(Tunisia)
0	1

First leg
Wydad AC	ES Tunis
0	0
- Date: 6 November 2011
- Venue: Stade Mohammed V, Casablanca
- Referee: Neant Alioum (Cameroon)
- Attendance: 70,000
- Weather: Cloudy; 15 °C (59 °F)

Second Leg
ES Tunis	Wydad AC
1	0
- Date: 12 November 2011
- Venue: Stade Olympique de Radès, Tunis
- Referee: Noumandiez Doué (Ivory Coast)
- Attendance: 50,000
- Weather: Partly Cloudy; 16 °C (61 °F)

The 2011 CAF Champions League final was the final of the 2011 CAF Champions League, the 47th edition of Africa's premier club football tournament organized by the Confederation of African Football (CAF), and the 15th edition under the current CAF Champions League format.

The final was played between Wydad AC from Morocco and Espérance ST from Tunisia. After a goal-less first leg, Espérance ST won the second leg 1–0 to win their second African title (the first being the 1994 African Cup of Champions Clubs). The win saw Espérance ST complete the Treble, and as a result, Espérance ST qualified to enter the quarterfinals of the 2011 FIFA Club World Cup as the CAF representative, as well as participate in the 2012 CAF Super Cup against the winner of the 2011 CAF Confederation Cup.

== Qualified teams ==
In the following table, finals until 1996 were in the African Cup of Champions Club era, since 1997 were in the CAF Champions League era.

Team	Region	Previous finals appearances (bold indicates winners)
(Morocco) Wydad AC	UNAF (North Africa)	**1992**
(Tunisia) ES Tunis	UNAF (North Africa)	**1994**, 1999, 2000, 2010

== Venues ==
=== Mohamed V Stadium ===
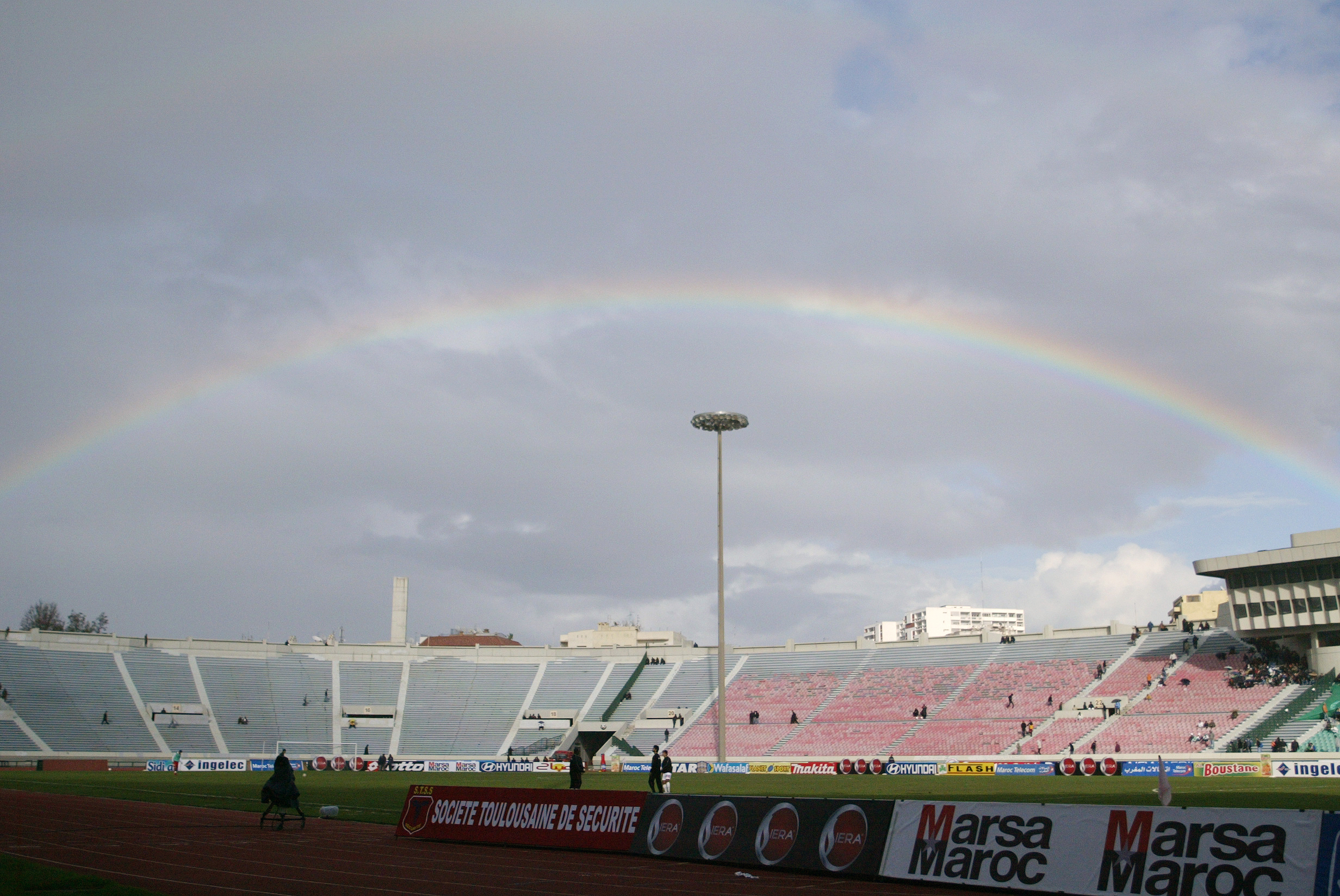
Mohamed V Stadium in Casablanca, Morocco hosted the first leg.

Mohammed V Stadium is part of a big athletic complex situated in the heart of the city of Casablanca, Morocco, in the western part of the Maarif neighborhood. It was inaugurated March 6, 1955, and currently has a capacity of 67,000.

Often hosting the games of the Morocco national football team, the Mohammed V Stadium is equally known as the home of Wydad AC and Raja CA. It is named after King Mohammed V of Morocco.

Mohammed V Stadium is located right in the centre of the city of Casablanca, the international airport of Casablanca is 25 kilometres from the stadium, and the Casa-Voyageurs rail station is 5 kilometres from the stadium. The stadium has a parking lot with a capacity of 1,000 cars.

It currently has a semi-artificial lawn of a high standard.

=== Stade Olympique de Radès ===
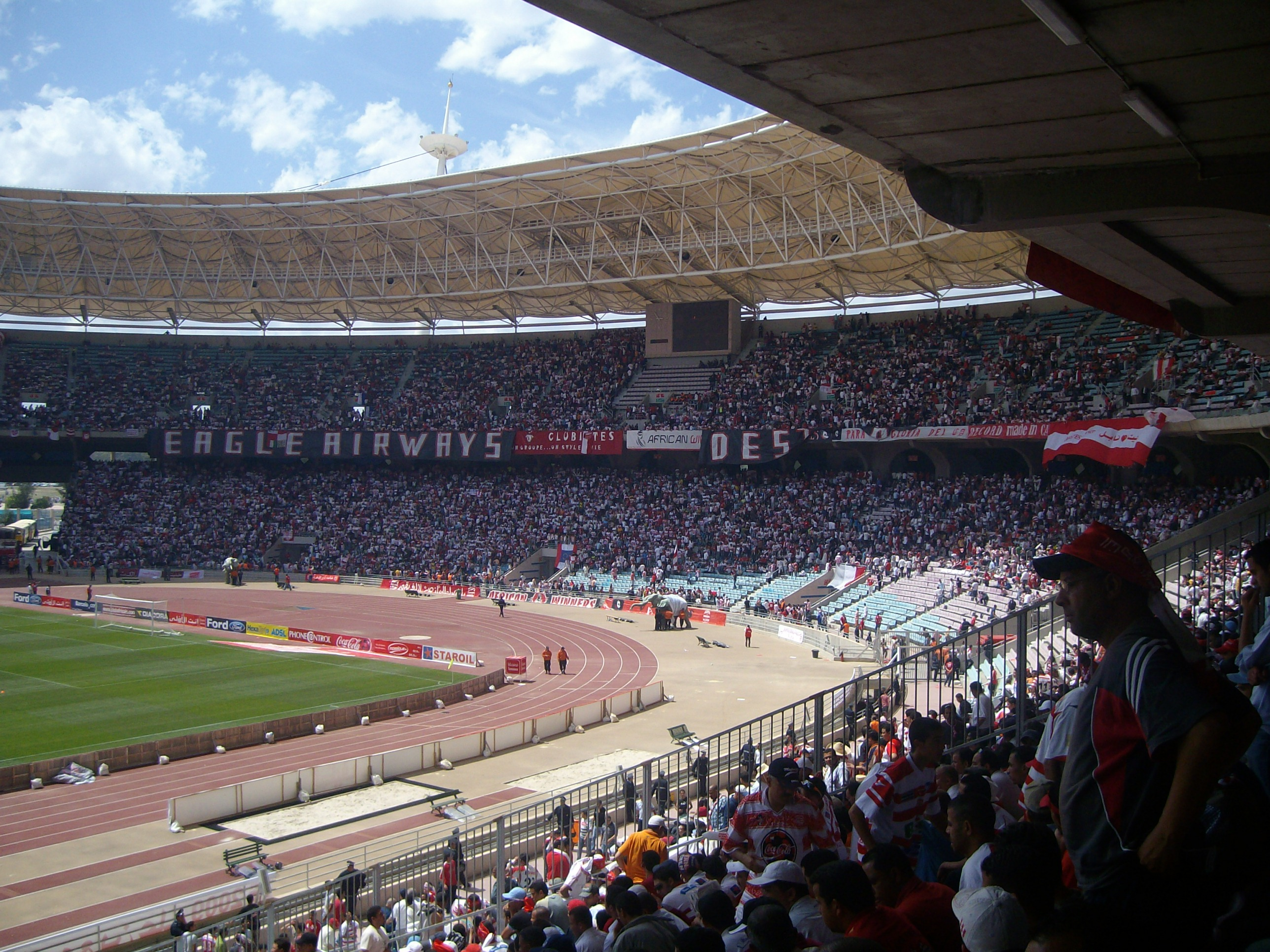
Stade Olympique de Radès in Tunis, Tunisia hosted the second leg.

Stade Olympique de Radès is a multi-purpose stadium in Radès, Tunisia about 10 kilometers south-east of the city center of Tunis, in the center of the Olympic City. It is currently used mostly for football matches and it also has facilities for athletics. The stadium holds 60,000 and was built in 2001 for the 2001 Mediterranean Games and is considered to be one of the best stadiums in Africa. The stadium was built for the 2001 Mediterranean Games, the 60,000-seat covered area covers 13,000 m2 and consists of a central area, 3 adjoining grounds, 2 warm-up rooms, 2 paintings and an official stand of 7,000 seats. The press gallery is equipped with 300 desks.

Club Africain and ES Tunis play their major league matches here. Before the construction of this stadium, the Tunis derby used to be played in the 45,000 seat-capacity Stade El Menzah. It is also the stadium of Tunisia national football team since 2001.

This stadium has hosted matches of the 2004 African Cup of Nations which was won by the Tunisian team.

== Road to final ==
(Morocco) Wydad AC				Round	(Tunisia) ES Tunis			
Opponent	Agg.	1st leg	2nd leg	Qualifying rounds	Opponent	Agg.	1st leg	2nd leg
(Ghana) Aduana Stars	3–1	3–0 (H)	0–1 (A)	Preliminary round	bye			
(Nigeria) Kano Pillars	2–0	2–0 (H)	0–0 (A)	First round	(Benin) ASPAC	5–2	5–0 (H)	0–2 (A)
(Democratic Republic of the Congo) TP Mazembe	1–2*	1–0 (H)	0–2 (A)	Second round	(Senegal) Diaraf	6–0	5–0 (H)	1–0 (A)
(Tanzania) Simba	3–0			Special play-off*	—			
Opponent	Result			Group stage	Opponent	Result		
(Egypt) Al Ahly	3–3 (A)			Matchday 1	(Algeria) MC Alger	1–1 (A)		
(Algeria) MC Alger	4–0 (H)			Matchday 2	(Egypt) Al Ahly	1–0 (H)		
(Tunisia) ES Tunis	2–2 (H)			Matchday 3	(Morocco) Wydad AC	2–2 (A)		
(Tunisia) ES Tunis	0–0 (A)			Matchday 4	(Morocco) Wydad AC	0–0 (H)		
(Egypt) Al Ahly	1–1 (H)			Matchday 5	(Algeria) MC Alger	4–0 (H)		
(Algeria) MC Alger	1–3 (A)			Matchday 6	(Egypt) Al Ahly	1–1 (A)		
Group B Runner-up: Pos / Team / Pld / W / D / L / GF / GA / GD / Pts / Qualification; 1 / (Tunisia) Espérance ST / 6 / 2 / 4 / 0 / 9 / 4 / +5 / **10** / **Advance to knockout stage**; **2** / (Morocco) Wydad AC / **6** / **1** / **4** / **1** / **11** / **9** / **+2** / **7 (Note: Wydad AC and Al-Ahly are ranked by their head-to-head records (decided by away goals).)** / **Advance to knockout stage**; 3 / (Egypt) Al-Ahly / 6 / 1 / 4 / 1 / 7 / 6 / +1 / **7**; 4 / (Algeria) MC Alger / 6 / 1 / 2 / 3 / 4 / 12 / −8 / **5**; Source: CAF; Notes:				Final standings	Group B Winner: Pos / Team / Pld / W / D / L / GF / GA / GD / Pts / Qualification; **1** / (Tunisia) Espérance ST / **6** / **2** / **4** / **0** / **9** / **4** / **+5** / **10** / **Advance to knockout stage**; 2 / (Morocco) Wydad AC / 6 / 1 / 4 / 1 / 11 / 9 / +2 / **7 (Note: Wydad AC and Al-Ahly are ranked by their head-to-head records (decided by away goals).)** / **Advance to knockout stage**; 3 / (Egypt) Al-Ahly / 6 / 1 / 4 / 1 / 7 / 6 / +1 / **7**; 4 / (Algeria) MC Alger / 6 / 1 / 2 / 3 / 4 / 12 / −8 / **5**; Source: CAF; Notes:			
Opponent	Agg.	1st leg	2nd leg	Knock-out stage	Opponent	Agg.	1st leg	2nd leg
(Nigeria) Enyimba	1–0	1–0 (H)	0–0 (A)	Semifinals	(Sudan) Al-Hilal	3–0	1–0 (A)	2–0 (H)

* TP Mazembe won 2–1 on aggregate, but were later disqualified for fielding an ineligible player in the first round. As a result, Wydad Casablanca played against Tanzanian side Simba, which lost to TP Mazembe in the first round, in a play-off for a place in the group stage.

== Format ==
The final was decided over two legs, with aggregate goals used to determine the winner. If the sides were level on aggregate after the second leg, the away goals rule would have been applied, and if still level, the tie would have proceeded directly to a penalty shootout (no extra time is played).

== First leg ==
6 November 2011
20:00 UTC±00:00

Wydad AC (Morocco)	0–0	(Tunisia) ES Tunis
	Report

Stade Mohammed V, Casablanca
Attendance: 70,000
Referee: Neant Alioum (Cameroon)

**Wydad AC**	**ES Tunis**

GK	1	(Morocco) Nadir Lamyaghri
DF	13	(Morocco) Youssef Rabeh
DF	3	(Morocco) Mourad Lemsen
DF	6	(Morocco) Hicham El Amrani		(substituted off) 88'
DF	10	(Morocco) Mohamed Berrabeh
DF	7	(Morocco) Ahmed Ajeddou	(yellow card) ?'
MF	28	(Morocco) Said Fettah	(yellow card) ?'
MF	8	(Morocco) Yassine Lakhal	(substituted off) 77'
MF	5	(Morocco) Abderrahmane Mssassi
MF	14	(Morocco) Yassine Rami	(substituted off) 64'
FW	21	(Republic of the Congo) Fabrice Ondama
Substitutes:
FW	16	(Morocco) Houcine Zaidoune		(substituted on) 64'
MF	4	(Morocco) Youssef Kaddioui Idrissi		(substituted on) 77'
FW	24	(Morocco) Younes Mankari		(substituted on) 88'
Manager:
(Switzerland) Michel Decastel

GK	1	(Tunisia) Moez Ben Cherifia
DF	29	(Tunisia) Walid Hichri
DF	6	(Mali) Idrissa Coulibaly	(yellow card) 29'
DF	12	(Tunisia) Khalil Chemmam
DF	3	(Cameroon) Banana Yaya
DF	19	(Tunisia) Khaled Mouelhi
MF	21	(Tunisia) Mejdi Traoui
MF	18	(Tunisia) Wajdi Bouazzi	(yellow card) 13'	(substituted off) 90'
MF	23	(Tunisia) Khaled Korbi
MF	28	(Tunisia) Youssef Msakni		(substituted off) 83'
FW	15	(Cameroon) Yannick N'Djeng		(substituted off) 90+5'
Substitutes:
MF	10	(Tunisia) Oussama Darragi		(substituted on) 83'
FW	26	(Ghana) Harrison Afful		(substituted on) 90'
MF	14	(Tunisia) Mohamed Ali Slama		(substituted on) 90+5'
Manager:
(Tunisia) Nabil Maâloul

Assistant referees:
Efarist Mikwande (Cameroon)
Moussa Yanoussa (Cameroon)
Fourth official:
Christopher Ndy (Cameroon)

== Second leg ==
12 November 2011
18:00 UTC+01:00

ES Tunis (Tunisia)	1–0	(Morocco) Wydad AC
Afful 21'	Report

Stade 7 November, Tunis
Attendance: 60,000
Referee: Noumandiez Doué (Ivory Coast)

**ES Tunis**	**Wydad AC**

GK	1	(Tunisia) Moez Ben Cherifia
DF	26	(Ghana) Harrison Afful
DF	29	(Tunisia) Walid Hichri
DF	12	(Tunisia) Khalil Chemmam
MF	3	(Cameroon) Banana Yaya
MF	21	(Tunisia) Mejdi Traoui	(yellow card) 84'
MF	18	(Tunisia) Wajdi Bouazzi
MF	23	(Tunisia) Khaled Korbi	(yellow card) 75'
MF	10	(Tunisia) Oussama Darragi		(substituted off) 84'
MF	28	(Tunisia) Youssef Msakni		(substituted off) 76'
FW	15	(Cameroon) Yannick N'Djeng		(substituted off) 88'
Substitutes:
MF	6	(Mali) Idrissa Coulibaly		(substituted on) 76'
FW	19	(Tunisia) Khaled Mouelhi		(substituted on) 84'
FW	7	(Tunisia) Khaled Ayari		(substituted on) 88'
Manager:
(Tunisia) Nabil Maâloul

GK	17	(Morocco) Yassine Bounou
DF	13	(Morocco) Youssef Rabeh
DF	3	(Morocco) Mourad Lemsen (red card) 44'
DF	6	(Morocco) Hicham El Amrani
DF	10	(Morocco) Mohamed Berrabeh	(yellow card) 65'
DF	7	(Morocco) Ahmed Ajeddou
MF	28	(Morocco) Said Fettah		(substituted off) 59'
MF	8	(Morocco) Yassine Lakhal		(substituted off) 70'
MF	5	(Morocco) Abderrahmane Mssassi	(yellow card) 48'
MF	14	(Morocco) Yassine Rami		(substituted off) 89'
FW	21	(Republic of the Congo) Fabrice Ondama
Substitutes:
FW	2	(Morocco) Ayoub Skouma		(substituted on) 59'
DF	4	(Morocco) Youssef Kaddioui		(substituted on) 70'
MF	27	(Benin) Pascal Angan		(substituted on) 89'
Manager:
(Switzerland) Michel Decastel

Assistant referees:
Pio Sangui (Ivory Coast)
Pierre Moussa (Ivory Coast)
Fourth official:
Ndre Koam (Ivory Coast)
