= 2011 CAF Champions League group stage =

- Dates: 16 July – 16 September 2011

Tournament statistics
- Matches played: 24
- Goals scored: 54 (2.25 per match)

The 2011 CAF Champions League group stage matches took place between July and September 2011. The matchdays were: 15–17 July, 29–31 July, 12–14 August, 26–28 August, 9–11 September, and 16–18 September.

The group stage featured the eight winners from the second round. They were divided into two groups of four, where they played each other home-and-away in a round-robin format. The top two teams in each group advanced to the semifinals.

== Seeding ==
The draw for the group stage took place on 15 May 2011, at the CAF Headquarters in Cairo.

The procedures for the group stage draw were announced on 12 May 2011. The teams were seeded into four pots, and each group contains one team from each pot.

Pot 1	Pot 2	Pot 3	Pot 4
(Egypt) Al-Ahly ^{(43 pts)} (Sudan) Al-Hilal ^{(31 pts)}	(Tunisia) Espérance ST ^{(24 pts)} (Cameroon) Coton Sport ^{(12 pts)}	(Nigeria) Enyimba ^{(11 pts)} (Algeria) MC Alger ^{(0 pts)}	(Morocco) Raja CA ^{(0 pts)} (Morocco) Wydad AC^{†} ^{(0 pts)}

Notes:

- Ranking score for teams is by their individual team 2006–2010 CAF 5-Year Ranking, the same ranking used to seed teams in the qualifying rounds.
- ^{†} Winner of play-off due to disqualification of TP Mazembe

== Tiebreakers ==
The order of tie-breakers used when two or more teams have equal number of points is:

1. Number of points obtained in games between the teams concerned;
2. Goal difference in games between the teams concerned;
3. Goals scored in games between the teams concerned;
4. Away goals scored in games between the teams concerned;
5. Goal difference in all games;
6. Goals scored in all games;
7. Drawing of lots.

== Groups ==
=== Group A ===
Pos	Team	Pld	W	D	L	GF	GA	GD	Pts	Qualification
1	(Nigeria) Enyimba	6	4	2	0	11	5	+6	14	Advance to knockout stage
2	(Sudan) Al-Hilal	6	2	2	2	6	7	−1	8	Advance to knockout stage
3	(Cameroon) Coton Sport FC	6	2	1	3	7	8	−1	7	
4	(Morocco) Raja CA	6	0	3	3	1	5	−4	3	

Source: CAF
Rules for classification: Group stage tiebreakers
16 July 2011
21:00 UTC+01:00

Raja CA (Morocco)	0 – 0	(Cameroon) Coton Sport
	Report

Stade Mohamed V, Casablanca
Referee: Jerome Damon (South Africa)
17 July 2011
14:00 UTC+01:00

Enyimba (Nigeria)	2 – 2	(Sudan) Al-Hilal
Valentine Nwabili 48'; Uche Kalu 60'	Report	Edward Sadomba 22', 76'

Enyimba International Stadium, Aba
Referee: Farouk Mohamed (Egypt)

29 July 2011
20:00 UTC+03:00

Al-Hilal (Sudan)	1 – 0	(Morocco) Raja CA
Edward Sadomba 63' (pen.)	Report

Al-Hilal Stadium, Omdurman
30 July 2011
15:00 UTC+01:00

Coton Sport (Cameroon)	2 – 3	(Nigeria) Enyimba
Chardin Madila Mfoutou 46'; Saidou Idrissa 63'	Report	Uche Kalu 8', 85'; Chidozie Johnson 40'

Stade Omnisports Roumde-Adja, Garoua

14 August 2011
14:00 UTC+01:00

Enyimba (Nigeria)	2 – 0	(Morocco) Raja CA
Uche Kalu 9'; Chidozie Johnson 25'	Report

Enyimba International Stadium, Aba
14 August 2011
22:00 UTC+03:00

Al-Hilal (Sudan)	2 – 1	(Cameroon) Coton Sport
Haitham Mustafa 28' (pen.); Edet Otobong 82'	Report	Chardin Madila Mfoutou 10'

Al-Hilal Stadium, Omdurman

26 August 2011
22:00 UTC±00:00

Raja CA (Morocco)	0 – 0	(Nigeria) Enyimba
	Report

Stade Mohamed V, Casablanca
28 August 2011
14:00 UTC+01:00

Coton Sport (Cameroon)	2 – 0	(Sudan) Al-Hilal
Jacques Haman 28'; Brice Zimbori 55'	Report

Stade Omnisports Roumde-Adja, Garoua

9 September 2011
20:30 UTC+03:00

Al-Hilal (Sudan)	1 – 2	(Nigeria) Enyimba
Edward Sadomba 6'	Report	Valentine Nwabili 68'; Samuel Tswanya 90' (pen.)

Al-Hilal Stadium, Omdurman
10 September 2011
16:00 UTC+01:00

Coton Sport (Cameroon)	2 – 1	(Morocco) Raja CA
Osmaila Baba 54', 64'	Report	Abdessamad Ouhakki 16'

Stade Omnisports Roumde-Adja, Garoua

18 September 2011
15:00 UTC±00:00

Raja CA (Morocco)	0 – 0	(Sudan) Al-Hilal
	Report

Stade Mohamed V, Casablanca
18 September 2011
16:00 UTC+01:00

Enyimba (Nigeria)	2 – 0	(Cameroon) Coton Sport
Ifeanyi Ede 45' (pen.); Valentine Nwabili 90'	Report

Enyimba International Stadium, Aba

=== Group B ===
Pos	Team	Pld	W	D	L	GF	GA	GD	Pts	Qualification
1	(Tunisia) Espérance ST	6	2	4	0	9	4	+5	10	Advance to knockout stage
2	(Morocco) Wydad AC	6	1	4	1	11	9	+2	7 (Note: Wydad AC and Al-Ahly are ranked by their head-to-head records (decided by away goals).)	Advance to knockout stage
3	(Egypt) Al-Ahly	6	1	4	1	7	6	+1	7	
4	(Algeria) MC Alger	6	1	2	3	4	12	−8	5	

Source: CAF
Notes:

Tiebreaker
Team	Pld	W	D	L	GF	GA	GD	AG	Pts
(Morocco) Wydad AC	2	0	2	0	4	4	0	3	2
(Egypt) Al-Ahly	2	0	2	0	4	4	0	1	2

16 July 2011
18:30 UTC+01:00

MC Alger (Algeria)	1 – 1	(Tunisia) Espérance ST
Mohamed Megherbi 17'	Report	Oussama Darragi 7'

Stade 5 Juillet 1962, Algiers
Referee: Daniel Bennett (South Africa)
17 July 2011
21:00 UTC+02:00

Al-Ahly (Egypt)	3 – 3	(Morocco) Wydad AC
Emad Moteab 2'; Wael Gomaa 21'; Dominique Da Silva 75'	Report	Sherif Abdel-Fadil 1' (o.g.); Mouhcine Iajour 66', 88'

Cairo Military Academy Stadium, Cairo
Referee: Bakary Gassama (Gambia)

30 July 2011
19:00 UTC+01:00

Wydad AC (Morocco)	4 – 0	(Algeria) MC Alger
Fabrice N'Guessi 1'; Ahmed Ajeddou 30' (pen.); Ayoub El Khaliqi 74'; Jean Louis Pascal Angan 90'	Report

Stade Mohamed V, Casablanca
Attendance: 50,000
30 July 2011
21:30 UTC+01:00

Espérance ST (Tunisia)	1 – 0	(Egypt) Al-Ahly
Yannick N'Djeng 14'	Report

Olympic Stadium, Tunis

12 August 2011
22:00 UTC+02:00

Al-Ahly (Egypt)	2 – 0	(Algeria) MC Alger
Emad Moteab 10', 31'	Report

Cairo International Stadium, Cairo
14 August 2011
22:00 UTC±00:00

Wydad AC (Morocco)	2 – 2	(Tunisia) Espérance ST
Fabrice N'Guessi 65'; Youssef Kaddioui 78' (pen.)	Report	Wajdi Bouazzi 22'; Walid Hichri 37'

Stade Mohamed V, Casablanca
Attendance: 67,000
Referee: Eddy Maillet (Seychelles)

27 August 2011
22:00 UTC+01:00

Espérance ST (Tunisia)	0 – 0	(Morocco) Wydad AC
	Report

Stade El Menzah, Tunis
28 August 2011
22:00 UTC+01:00

MC Alger (Algeria)	0 – 0	(Egypt) Al-Ahly
	Report

Stade 5 Juillet 1962, Algiers

10 September 2011
19:10 UTC+01:00

Espérance ST (Tunisia)	4 – 0	(Algeria) MC Alger
Mejdi Traoui 8'; Yannick N'Djeng 21', 43', 55'	Report

Stade El Menzah, Tunis
11 September 2011
19:30 UTC±00:00

Wydad AC (Morocco)	1 – 1	(Egypt) Al-Ahly
Abderrahim Benkajjane 48'	Report	Mohamed Nagy 36'

Stade Mohamed V, Casablanca

16 September 2011
19:00 UTC+01:00

MC Alger (Algeria)	3 – 1	(Morocco) Wydad AC
Réda Babouche 32', 36'; Hervé Oussalé 61'	Report	Ahmed Ajeddou 79' (pen.)

Stade 5 Juillet 1962, Algiers
16 September 2011
20:00 UTC+02:00

Al-Ahly (Egypt)	1 – 1	(Tunisia) Espérance ST
Mohamed Aboutrika 54'	Report	Banana Yaya 17'

Cairo International Stadium, Cairo
