= 2011 CAF Champions League =

Tournament details
- Dates: 28 January – 13 November 2011
- Teams: 55 (from 43 associations)

Final positions
- Champions: (Tunisia) Espérance ST (2nd title)
- Runners-up: (Morocco) Wydad AC

Tournament statistics
- Matches played: 117
- Goals scored: 278 (2.38 per match)
- Top scorer(s): (Zimbabwe) Edward Sadomba (7 goals)

The 2011 CAF Champions League (also known as the 2011 Orange CAF Champions League for sponsorship reasons) was the 47th edition of Africa's premier club football tournament organized by the Confederation of African Football (CAF), and the 15th edition under the current CAF Champions League format. The winner Espérance ST participated in the 2011 FIFA Club World Cup, and also played in the 2012 CAF Super Cup.

== Association team allocation ==
Theoretically, up to 55 CAF member associations may enter the 2011 CAF Champions League, with the 12 highest ranked associations according to CAF 5-year ranking eligible to enter 2 teams in the competition. For this year's competition, CAF used 2005-09 5-Year ranking. As a result, a maximum of 67 teams could enter the tournament – although this level has never been reached.

=== Ranking system ===
CAF calculates points for each entrant association based on their clubs’ performance over the last 5 years in the CAF Champions League and CAF Confederation Cup, not taking into considering the running year. The criteria for points are the following:

| | CAF Champions League | CAF Confederation Cup |
|---|---|---|
| Winner | 5 points | 4 points |
| Runner-up | 4 points | 3 points |
| Losing semi-finalists | 3 points | 2 points |
| 3rd place in groups | 2 points | 1 point |
| 4th place in groups | 1 point | 1 point |

The points are multiplied by a coefficient according to the year as follow:

- 2009 – 5
- 2008 – 4
- 2007 – 3
- 2006 – 2
- 2005 – 1

This system is different from the one used for the 2010 CAF Champions League and previous years.

A similar procedure is used to rank clubs, with the exception that the results from 2006 to 2010 are used (with 2010 weighted by 5, 2009 by 4, and so on)

=== Entrants list ===
Below is the entrants list for the competition. Nations are shown according to their 2005–2009 CAF 5-year ranking – those with a ranking score have their rank and score indicated. Teams were also seeded using their individual team 2006–2010 5-year ranking. The top nine sides (shown in bold) received byes to the first qualifying round.

| Association | Club | Qualifying method |
Associations with two entrants (Ranked 1–12)
| Tunisia (1st – 96 pts) | **Espérance ST**^{(4th – 24pts)} | 2009–10 Tunisian Ligue Professionnelle 1 champion |
| Tunisia (1st – 96 pts) | Club Africain^{(18th – 3 pts)} | 2009–10 Tunisian Ligue Professionnelle 1 runner-up |
| Egypt (2nd – 87 pts) | **Al-Ahly**^{(2nd – 43 pts)} | 2009–10 Egyptian Premier League champion |
| Egypt (2nd – 87 pts) | Zamalek^{(18th – 3 pts)} | 2009–10 Egyptian Premier League runner-up |
| Nigeria (3rd – 75 pts) | Enyimba^{(13th – 11 pts)} | 2009–10 Nigeria Premier League champion |
| Nigeria (3rd – 75 pts) | Kano Pillars^{(=11th – 12 pts)} | 2009–10 Nigeria Premier League runner-up |
| Sudan (4th – 54 pts) | **Al-Hilal**^{(3rd – 31 pts)} | 2010 Sudan Premier League champion |
| Sudan (4th – 54 pts) | **Al-Merreikh**^{(=6th – 16 pts)} | 2010 Sudan Premier League runner-up |
| (Democratic Republic of the Congo) Congo DR (5th – 46 pts) | AS Vita Club^{(=16th – 4 pts)} | 2010 Linafoot champion |
| (Democratic Republic of the Congo) Congo DR (5th – 46 pts) | **TP Mazembe**^{(1st – 55 pts)} | 2010 Linafoot runner-up |
| Algeria (6th – 27 pts) | MC Alger | 2009–10 Algerian Championnat National champion |
| Algeria (6th – 27 pts) | **ES Sétif**^{(5th – 22 pts)} | 2009–10 Algerian Championnat National runner-up |
| Morocco (=7th – 20 pts) | Wydad AC | 2009–10 Botola champion |
| Morocco (=7th – 20 pts) | Raja Casablanca | 2009–10 Botola runner-up |
| Mali (=7th – 20 pts) | **Stade Malien**^{(=6th – 16 pts)} | 2009–10 Malian Première Division champion |
| Mali (=7th – 20 pts) | Djoliba^{(15th – 5 pts)} | 2009–10 Malian Première Division runner-up |
| Cameroon (9th – 19 pts) | Coton Sport FC^{(=11th – 12 pts)} | 2009–10 Cameroonian Premier League champion |
| Cameroon (9th – 19 pts) | Les Astres FC^{(20th – 2 pts)} | 2009–10 Cameroonian Premier League runner-up |
| Ivory Coast (=10th – 18 pts) | ASEC Mimosas^{(10th – 13 pts)} | 2010 Côte d'Ivoire Premier Division champion |
| Ivory Coast (=10th – 18 pts) | JC Abidjan | 2010 Côte d'Ivoire Premier Division runner-up |
| Angola (=10th – 18 pts) | Inter Luanda^{(=16th – 4 pts)} | 2010 Girabola (XXXII) champion |
| Angola (=10th – 18 pts) | CR Caála | 2010 Girabola (XXXII) runner-up |
| Zimbabwe (12th – 17 pts) | Motor Action | 2010 Zimbabwe Premier Soccer League champion |
| Zimbabwe (12th – 17 pts) | **Dynamos**^{(9th – 14 pts)} | 2010 Zimbabwe Premier Soccer League runner-up |
Associations with one entrant (Fewer ranking points than the 12th CAF association)
| Ghana (13th – 12 pts) | Aduana Stars | 2009–10 Ghana Premier League champion |
| Zambia (14th – 10 pts) | ZESCO United^{(14th – 8 pts)} | 2010 Zambian Premier League champion |
| Libya (15th – 9 pts) | **Al-Ittihad**^{(=6th – 16 pts)} | 2009–10 Libyan Premier League champion |
| South Africa (16th – 7 pts) | Supersport United | 2009–10 Premier Soccer League champion |
| Equatorial Guinea (17th – 2 pts) | Deportivo Mongomo | 2010 Equatoguinean Premier League champion |
| Gabon (=18th – 1 pt) | US Bitam | 2009–10 Gabon Championnat National D1 champion |
| Guinea (=18th – 1 pt) | Fello Star | 2009–10 Guinée Championnat National champion |
| Benin | ASPAC | 2009–10 Benin Premier League champion |
| Botswana | Township Rollers | 2009–10 Botswana Premier League champion |
| Burkina Faso | ASFA Yennenga | 2009–10 Burkinabé Premier League champion |
| Burundi | Vital'O FC | 2009–10 Burundi Premier League champion |
| Central African Republic | Olympic Real de Bangui | 2010 Central African Republic League champion |
| Chad | Tourbillon FC | 2010 Ligue de N'Djaména champion |
| Comoros | Élan Club | 2010 Comoros Premier League champion |
| (Republic of the Congo) Congo | Saint Michel de Ouenzé | 2010 Congo Premier League champion |
| Ethiopia | Saint-George SA | 2009–10 Ethiopian Premier League champion |
| (The Gambia) Gambia | Ports Authority | 2010 GFA League First Division champion |
| Kenya | Ulinzi Stars | 2010 Kenyan Premier League champion |
| Lesotho | Matlama | 2009–10 Lesotho Premier League champion |
| Liberia | Mighty Barrolle | 2009 Liberian Premier League champion (no league champion in 2010) |
| Madagascar | CNaPS Sport | 2010 THB Champions League champion |
| Mauritania | CF Cansado | 2010 Mauritanean Premier League champion |
| Mozambique | Liga Muçulmana | 2010 Moçambola champion |
| Niger | ASFAN | 2010 Niger Premier League champion |
| Rwanda | APR | 2009–10 Rwandan Premier League champion |
| Senegal | Diaraf | 2010 Senegal Premier League champion |
| Seychelles | St Michel United | 2010 Seychelles League champion |
| Sierra Leone | East End Lions | 2009–10 Sierra Leone National Premier League champion |
| (Eswatini) Swaziland | Young Buffaloes | 2009–10 Swazi Premier League champion |
| Tanzania | Simba | 2009–10 Tanzanian Premier League champion |
| Zanzibar | Zanzibar Ocean View | 2010 Zanzibar Premier League champion |

Notes

- Associations that did not enter a team: Cape Verde, Djibouti, Eritrea, Guinea-Bissau, Malawi, Mauritius, Namibia, Réunion, São Tomé and Príncipe, Somalia, Togo, Uganda
- Unranked associations have no ranking points and hence are equal 20th.
- Unranked teams have no rankings points and hence are equal 21st. Club ranking is determined only between teams qualified for the 2011 CAF Champions League.

== Round and draw dates ==
Schedule of dates for 2011 competition.

| Phase | Round | Draw date | First leg | Second leg |
|---|---|---|---|---|
| Qualifying | Preliminary round | 20 December 2010 (Cairo, Egypt) | 28–30 January | 11–13 February; 25–27 February^{†} 4–6 March^{†} |
| Qualifying | First round | 20 December 2010 (Cairo, Egypt) | 18–20 March | 1–3 April |
| Qualifying | Second round | 20 December 2010 (Cairo, Egypt) | 22–24 April | 6–8 May |
| Group stage | Matchday 1 | 15 May 2011 (Cairo, Egypt) | 15–17 July | |
| Group stage | Matchday 2 | 15 May 2011 (Cairo, Egypt) | 29–31 July | |
| Group stage | Matchday 3 | 15 May 2011 (Cairo, Egypt) | 12–14 August | |
| Group stage | Matchday 4 | 15 May 2011 (Cairo, Egypt) | 26–28 August | |
| Group stage | Matchday 5 | 15 May 2011 (Cairo, Egypt) | 9–11 September | |
| Group stage | Matchday 6 | 15 May 2011 (Cairo, Egypt) | 16–18 September | |
| Knock-out stage | Semifinals | 15 May 2011 (Cairo, Egypt) | 30 September–2 October | 14–16 October |
| Knock-out stage | Final | 15 May 2011 (Cairo, Egypt) | 4–6 November | 11–13 November |

^{†} The second leg of the preliminary round matches are postponed to 25–27 February (or further to 4–6 March) in case the club have at least three players in the 2011 African Nations Championship.

== Qualifying rounds ==
The fixtures for the preliminary, first and second qualifying rounds were announced on 20 December 2010.

Qualification ties were decided over two legs, with aggregate goals used to determine the winner. If the sides were level on aggregate after the second leg, the away goals rule applied, and if still level, the tie proceeded directly to a penalty shootout (no extra time is played).

=== Preliminary round ===
| Team 1 | Agg. | Team 2 | 1st leg | 2nd leg |
|---|---|---|---|---|
| ASFAN (Niger) | 0–3 | (Ivory Coast) JC Abidjan | 0–0 | 0–3 |
| Saint Michel de Ouenzé (Republic of the Congo) | 0–3 | (Nigeria) Enyimba | 0–1 | 0–2 |
| US Bitam (Gabon) | 0–0 (5–3 p) | (Cameroon) Les Astres FC | 0–0 | 0–0 |
| Olympic Real de Bangui (Central African Republic) | 1–3 | (Algeria) MC Alger | 1–1 | 0–2 |
| Inter Luanda (Angola) | w/o^{1} | (Botswana) Township Rollers | — | — |
| East End Lions (Sierra Leone) | 0–4 | (Mali) Djoliba | 0–2 | 0–2 |
| Diaraf (Senegal) | 3–1 | (The Gambia) Ports Authority | 1–1 | 2–0 |
| ASPAC (Benin) | 2–1 | (Equatorial Guinea) Deportivo Mongomo | 1–0 | 1–1 |
| ASEC Mimosas (Ivory Coast) | 9–0 | (Mauritania) CF Cansado | 7–0 | 2–0 |
| Motor Action (Zimbabwe) | 1–1 (4–3 p) | (Madagascar) CNaPS Sport | 0–1 | 1–0 |
| Raja Casablanca (Morocco) | w/o^{2} | (Chad) Tourbillon | 10–1 | — |
| Ulinzi Stars (Kenya) | 0–5 | (Egypt) Zamalek | 0–4 | 0–1 |
| APR (Rwanda) | 2–6 | (Tunisia) Club Africain | 2–2 | 0–4 |
| Recreativo Caála (Angola) | 2–1 | (Ethiopia) Saint-George SA | 2–0 | 0–1 |
| Élan Club (Comoros) | 2–4 | (Tanzania) Simba | 0–0 | 2–4 |
| Mighty Barrolle (Liberia) | 1–3 | (Nigeria) Kano Pillars | 1–2 | 0–1 |
| Wydad AC (Morocco) | 3–1 | (Ghana) Aduana Stars | 3–0 | 0–1 |
| Fello Star (Guinea) | 1–4 | (Burkina Faso) ASFA Yennenga | 1–1 | 0–3 |
| Vital'O FC (Burundi) | 3–3 (a) | (Cameroon) Coton Sport FC | 2–2 | 1–1 |
| Zanzibar Ocean View | 1–4 | (Democratic Republic of the Congo) AS Vita Club | 1–1 | 0–3 |
| Supersport United (South Africa) | 3–2 | (Lesotho) Matlama | 2–0 | 1–2 |
| Young Buffaloes (Eswatini) | 4–2 | (Seychelles) St Michel United | 3–0 | 1–2 |
| ZESCO United (Zambia) | 4–2 | (Mozambique) Liga Muçulmana | 3–0 | 1–2 |

Notes

- Note 1: Inter Luanda advanced to the first round after Township Rollers F.C. withdrew.
- Note 2: Raja Casablanca advanced to the first round after Tourbillon withdrew following the first leg.

=== First round ===
| Team 1 | Agg. | Team 2 | 1st leg | 2nd leg |
|---|---|---|---|---|
| JC Abidjan (Ivory Coast) | w/o^{3} | (Libya) Al-Ittihad | — | — |
| US Bitam (Gabon) | 1–2 | (Nigeria) Enyimba | 0–0 | 1–2 |
| Dynamos (Zimbabwe) | 4–4 (a) | (Algeria) MC Alger | 4–1 | 0–3 |
| Al-Merreikh (Sudan) | 2–2 (2–3 p) | (Angola) Inter Luanda | 2–0 | 0–2 |
| Diaraf (Senegal) | 4–1 | (Mali) Djoliba | 3–0 | 1–1 |
| Espérance ST (Tunisia) | 5–2 | (Benin) ASPAC | 5–0 | 0–2 |
| Motor Action (Zimbabwe) | 0–0 (2–4 p) | (Ivory Coast) ASEC Mimosas | 0–0 | —^{4} |
| Stade Malien (Mali) | 2–2 (a) | (Morocco) Raja Casablanca | 2–1 | 0–1 |
| Club Africain (Tunisia) | w/o^{5} | (Egypt) Zamalek | 4–2 | Abd^{5} |
| Al-Hilal (Sudan) | 4–1 | (Angola) Recreativo Caála | 3–0 | 1–1 |
| TP Mazembe (Democratic Republic of the Congo) | w/o^{6} | (Tanzania) Simba | 3–1 | 3–2 |
| Wydad AC (Morocco) | 2–0 | (Nigeria) Kano Pillars | 2–0 | 0–0 |
| ES Sétif (Algeria) | 6–3 | (Burkina Faso) ASFA Yennenga | 2–0 | 4–3 |
| AS Vita Club (Democratic Republic of the Congo) | 0–3 | (Cameroon) Coton Sport FC | 0–1 | 0–2 |
| Al-Ahly (Egypt) | 2–1 | (South Africa) Supersport United | 2–0 | 0–1 |
| ZESCO United (Zambia) | 7–0 | (Eswatini) Young Buffaloes | 5–0 | 2–0 |

Notes

- Note 3: Al-Ittihad advanced to the second round after JC Abidjan withdrew. Tie was scheduled to be played at a neutral venue over one leg due to the political situations in Côte d'Ivoire and Libya, but match did not take place.
- Note 4: Tie played over one leg due to the political situation in Côte d'Ivoire.
- Note 5: Second leg abandoned on 90+5 minutes with Zamalek SC leading 2–1 (Club Africain leading 5–4 on aggregate) when Zamalek SC fans invaded the pitch.
- Note 6: TP Mazembe won 6–3 on aggregate, but were later disqualified for fielding an ineligible player. As a result, Simba played against Moroccan side Wydad AC, which lost to TP Mazembe in the second round, in a play-off for a place in the group stage.

=== Second round ===
| Team 1 | Agg. | Team 2 | 1st leg | 2nd leg |
|---|---|---|---|---|
| Enyimba (Nigeria) | 1–0 | (Libya) Al-Ittihad | 1–0 | —^{7} |
| Inter Luanda (Angola) | 3–4 | (Algeria) MC Alger | 1–1 | 2–3 |
| Espérance ST (Tunisia) | 6–0 | (Senegal) Diaraf | 5–0 | 1–0 |
| Raja Casablanca (Morocco) | 1–1 (5–4 p) | (Ivory Coast) ASEC Mimosas | 1–1 | —^{7} |
| Al-Hilal (Sudan) | w/o^{8} | (Tunisia) Club Africain | 1–0 | Abd^{8} |
| Wydad AC (Morocco) | w/o^{9} | (Democratic Republic of the Congo) TP Mazembe | 1–0 | 0–2 |
| Coton Sport FC (Cameroon) | 4–3 | (Algeria) ES Sétif | 4–1 | 0–2 |
| ZESCO United (Zambia) | 0–1 | (Egypt) Al-Ahly | 0–0 | 0–1 |

Notes

- Note 7: Ties scheduled to be played over one leg due to the political situations in Côte d'Ivoire and Libya.
- Note 8: Second leg abandoned on 81 minutes with the score at 1–1 (Al-Hilal leading 2–1 on aggregate) when Club Africain fans invaded the pitch.
- Note 9: TP Mazembe won 2–1 on aggregate, but were later disqualified for fielding an ineligible player in the first round. As a result, Wydad AC played against Tanzanian side Simba, which lost to TP Mazembe in the first round, in a play-off for a place in the group stage.

The losing teams from the second round advance to the 2011 CAF Confederation Cup play-off round.

=== Special play-off ===
On 14 May 2011, CAF announced that TP Mazembe (Congo DR) were ejected from the Champions League following a complaint about the eligibility of TP Mazembe player Janvier Besala Bokungu from Tanzanian club Simba, who lost to them in the first round.

As a result, the Organising Committee decided that a replacement for the group stage would be determined by a play-off match at a neutral venue between Simba and Moroccan club Wydad AC (who lost to TP Mazembe in the second round).

| Team 1 | Score | Team 2 |
|---|---|---|
| Wydad AC (Morocco) | 3–0 | (Tanzania) Simba |

== Group stage ==
Key to colours in group tables
Group winners and runners-up advance to the Semifinals

=== Group A ===
| Pos | Team | Pld | W | D | L | GF | GA | GD | Pts | Qualification | ENY | HIL | COT | RCA |
|---|---|---|---|---|---|---|---|---|---|---|---|---|---|---|
| 1 | (Nigeria) Enyimba | 6 | 4 | 2 | 0 | 11 | 5 | +6 | 14 | Advance to knockout stage | — | 2–2 | 2–0 | 2–0 |
| 2 | (Sudan) Al-Hilal | 6 | 2 | 2 | 2 | 6 | 7 | −1 | 8 | Advance to knockout stage | 1–2 | — | 2–1 | 1–0 |
| 3 | (Cameroon) Coton Sport FC | 6 | 2 | 1 | 3 | 7 | 8 | −1 | 7 | | 2–3 | 2–0 | — | 2–1 |
| 4 | (Morocco) Raja CA | 6 | 0 | 3 | 3 | 1 | 5 | −4 | 3 | | 0–0 | 0–0 | 0–0 | — |

Source: CAF
Rules for classification: Group stage tiebreakers

=== Group B ===
| Pos | Team | Pld | W | D | L | GF | GA | GD | Pts | Qualification | EST | WAC | AHL | MCA |
|---|---|---|---|---|---|---|---|---|---|---|---|---|---|---|
| 1 | (Tunisia) Espérance ST | 6 | 2 | 4 | 0 | 9 | 4 | +5 | 10 | Advance to knockout stage | — | 0–0 | 1–0 | 4–0 |
| 2 | (Morocco) Wydad AC | 6 | 1 | 4 | 1 | 11 | 9 | +2 | 7 (Note: Wydad AC and Al-Ahly are ranked by their head-to-head records (decided by away goals).) | Advance to knockout stage | 2–2 | — | 1–1 | 4–0 |
| 3 | (Egypt) Al-Ahly | 6 | 1 | 4 | 1 | 7 | 6 | +1 | 7 | | 1–1 | 3–3 | — | 2–0 |
| 4 | (Algeria) MC Alger | 6 | 1 | 2 | 3 | 4 | 12 | −8 | 5 | | 1–1 | 3–1 | 0–0 | — |

Source: CAF

== Knockout stage ==
=== Bracket ===
Semi-finals
1 | (Morocco) Wydad AC | 1 | 0 | 1
4 | (Nigeria) Enyimba | 0 | 0 | 0
3 | (Sudan) Al-Hilal | 0 | 0 | 0
2 | (Tunisia) Espérance ST | 1 | 2 | 3

Final
(Morocco) Wydad AC | 0 | 0 | 0
(Tunisia) Espérance ST | 0 | 1 | 1

=== Semi-finals ===
| Team 1 | Agg. | Team 2 | 1st leg | 2nd leg |
|---|---|---|---|---|
| Wydad AC (Morocco) | 1–0 | (Nigeria) Enyimba | 1–0 | 0–0 |
| Al-Hilal (Sudan) | 0–3 | (Tunisia) Espérance ST | 0–1 | 0–2 |

=== Final ===
6 November 2011
20:00 UTC±00:00

| Wydad AC (Morocco) | 0 – 0 | (Tunisia) Espérance ST |
|---|---|---|
| | Report |

Stade Mohammed V, Casablanca
Attendance: 70,000
Referee: Neant Alioum (Cameroon)
12 November 2011
18:00 UTC+01:00

| Espérance ST (Tunisia) | 1 – 0 | (Morocco) Wydad AC |
|---|---|---|
| Afful 21' | Report |

Stade Olympique de Radès, Tunis
Attendance: 60,000
Referee: Noumandiez Doué (Ivory Coast)

Espérance de Tunis won 1–0 on aggregate.

== Top scorers ==
| Rank | Name | Team | Goals |
|---|---|---|---|
| 1 | (Zimbabwe) Edward Sadomba | (Sudan) Al-Hilal | 7 |
| 2 | (Tunisia) Youssef Msakni | (Tunisia) ES Tunis | 5 |
| 2 | (Morocco) Mouhcine Iajour | (Morocco) Wydad AC | 5 |
| 4 | (Ivory Coast) Adama Bakayoko | (Ivory Coast) ASEC Mimosas | 4 |
| 4 | (Nigeria) Uche Kalu | (Nigeria) Enyimba | 4 |
| 4 | (Cameroon) Yannick N'Djeng | (Tunisia) ES Tunis | 4 |
| 4 | (Tunisia) Oussama Darragi | (Tunisia) ES Tunis | 4 |
| 4 | (Angola) Pedro Henriques | (Angola) Interclube | 4 |
| 4 | (Zambia) Alfred Luputa | (Zambia) ZESCO United | 4 |
| 4 | (Republic of the Congo) Fabrice N'Guessi | (Morocco) Wydad AC | 4 |
| 11 | (Egypt) Emad Moteab | (Egypt) Al-Ahly | 3 |
| 11 | (Cameroon) Jacques Haman | (Cameroon) Coton Sport FC | 3 |
| 11 | (Cameroon) Hilaire Momi | (Cameroon) Coton Sport FC | 3 |
| 11 | (Algeria) Lazhar Hadj Aïssa | (Algeria) ES Sétif | 3 |
| 11 | (Algeria) Nabil Hemani | (Algeria) ES Sétif | 3 |
| 11 | (Nigeria) Victor Barnabas | (Nigeria) Enyimba | 3 |
| 11 | (Nigeria) Valentine Nwabili | (Nigeria) Enyimba | 3 |
| 11 | (Algeria) Réda Babouche | (Algeria) MC Alger | 3 |
| 11 | (Algeria) Brahim Bedbouda | (Algeria) MC Alger | 3 |
| 11 | (Algeria) Abdelmalek Mokdad | (Algeria) MC Alger | 3 |
| 11 | (Central African Republic) Kellebonin | (Central African Republic) Olympic Real | 3 |
| 11 | (Morocco) Hassan Tair | (Morocco) Raja CA | 3 |
| 11 | (Angola) Paizinho | (Angola) Recreativo Caála | 3 |
| 11 | (Tanzania) Mbwana Samata | (Tanzania) Simba SC | 3 |

== See also ==
- 2011 CAF Confederation Cup
- 2012 CAF Super Cup
- 2011 FIFA Club World Cup
