= Football in Guinea =

- Country: Guinea
- Governing body: Guinean Football Federation
- National team: national football team

Club competitions
- Guinée Championnat National

International competitions
- Champions League; CAF Confederation Cup; Super Cup; FIFA Club World Cup; FIFA World Cup (national team); African Cup of Nations (national team)

Football is the most popular sport in the country of Guinea. It is run by the Guinean Football Federation. Approximately 45% of the people in Guinea are considered association football fans.

The association administers the national football team, as well as the national league. It was founded in 1960 and affiliated with FIFA since 1962 and with the Confederation of African Football since 1963.

The Guinea national football team, nicknamed Syli nationale (National Elephants), have played international football since 1962. Their first opponent was East Germany. They have yet to reach a World Cup final, but they were runners-up to Morocco in the Africa Cup of Nations in 1976.

Guinée Championnat National is the top division of Guinean football. Since it was established in 1965, three teams have dominated in winning the Guinée Coupe Nationale. Horoya AC leads with 16 titles. Hafia FC (known as Conakry II in the 1960s) is second with 15 titles, dominating the 1960s and '70s, but with the last coming in 1985. Third with 13 is AS Kaloum Star, known as Conakry I in the 1960s. All three teams are based in the capital, Conakry. No other team has more than five titles.

The 1970s were a golden decade for Guinean football. Hafia FC won the African Cup of Champions Clubs three times, in 1972, 1975 and 1977, while Horoya AC won the 1978 African Cup Winners' Cup.

== Stadiums ==
Nongo Stadium, the home stadium of the national team, was opened in 2011 and has a capacity of 50,000. The Stade du 28 Septembre, constructed in 1962, can seat 25,000. Both these stadiums are located in Conakry. The Stade Régional Saifoullaye Diallo is in Labé, and can hold 5,000 fans. It is the home of Fello Star.

Stadium	City	Capacity	Tenants	Image
General Lansana Conté Stadium	Conakry	50,000	Guinea national football team	
Stade du 28 Septembre	Conakry	25,000		
Stade du 3 Avril	Nzérékoré	10,000		
Stade Régional Saifoullaye Diallo	Labé	5,000	Fello Star	

== Attendances ==
The average attendance per top-flight football league season and the club with the highest average attendance:

Season	League average	Best club	Best club average
2018-19	450	Horoya AC	1,867

Source: League page on Wikipedia

== See also ==
- Guinea national football team results
- Lists of stadiums
