= 2011 CAF Champions League knockout stage =

The 2011 CAF Champions League knock-out stage matches took place between September and November 2011. The matchdays were: 30 September–2 October (semifinals first leg), 14–16 October (semifinals second leg), 4–6 November (final first leg), 11–13 November (final second leg).

All knock-out ties were decided over two legs, with aggregate goals used to determine the winner. If the sides were level on aggregate after the second leg, the away goals rule applied, and if still level, the tie proceeded directly to a penalty shootout (no extra time is played).

== Qualified teams ==
The knock-out stage featured four teams: the two group winners and the two group runners-up from the group stage. In the semi-finals, the group A winners played the group B runners-up, and the group B winners played the group A runners-up. In both ties, the group winners hosted the second leg at home.

Group	Winners	Runners-up
A	(Nigeria) Enyimba	(Sudan) Al-Hilal
B	(Tunisia) Espérance ST	(Morocco) Wydad AC

== Semifinals ==
1 October 2011
19:00 UTC±00:00

Wydad AC (Morocco)	1 – 0	(Nigeria) Enyimba
Pascal Angan 89'	Report

Stade Mohamed V, Casablanca
16 October 2011
16:00 UTC+01:00

Enyimba (Nigeria)	0 – 0	(Morocco) Wydad AC
	Report

Enyimba International Stadium, Aba

Wydad AC won 1–0 on aggregate and advanced to the 2011 CAF Champions League Final.

2 October 2011
20:00 UTC+03:00

Al-Hilal (Sudan)	0 – 1	(Tunisia) Espérance ST
	Report	Youssef Msakni 4'

Al-Hilal Stadium, Omdurman
15 October 2011
19:30 UTC+01:00

Espérance ST (Tunisia)	2 – 0	(Sudan) Al-Hilal
Youssef Msakni 52'; Wajdi Bouazzi 90'	Report

Olympic Stadium, Tunis

Espérance ST won 3–0 on aggregate and advanced to the 2011 CAF Champions League Final.

== Final ==
6 November 2011
20:00 UTC±00:00

Wydad AC (Morocco)	0 – 0	(Tunisia) Espérance ST
	Report

Stade Mohamed V, Casablanca
Referee: Neant Alioum (Cameroon)
12 November 2011
18:00 UTC+01:00

Espérance ST (Tunisia)	1 – 0	(Morocco) Wydad AC
Harrison Afful 18'	Report

Olympic Stadium, Tunis
Referee: Noumandiez Doue (Ivory Coast)

Espérance ST won 1–0 on aggregate.
