= 2024 Nzérékoré stampede =

2024 crowd crush in Guinea

2024 Nzérekoré stampede
- Date: 1 December 2024
- Location: Nzérékoré, Guinea; 7°45′29″N 8°49′3″W
- Cause: Tear gas launched by police amid fight between rival football fans
- Deaths: 56 (official); 140 (11 missing) (reported)
- Injuries: Unknown

On 1 December 2024, a stampede occurred at the Stade du 3 Avril, a football stadium in the Guinean city of Nzérékoré, resulting in at least 56 deaths. Civil society groups said at least 140 people died, 11 missing, most of them children.

== Venue ==
The Stade du 3 Avril, the only stadium in Nzérékoré Prefecture, has been in poor quality for multiple years. Renovation work started on the stadium in 2008, but was later halted, in part due to political instability. The stadium was reported to have a muddy field, half-finished roof, unfinished stands, and unbuilt bathroom facilities and ticket offices. Although athletes continued to train and play in the stadium, the structure was also reported to be used by local drug users.

Local authorities had been trying for years to secure funding to improve the structure.

== Events ==
On 1 December 2024, a football match between teams from Nzérékoré and Labé was held at the Stade du 3 Avril as part of a tournament organised in honour of the country's president, Mamady Doumbouya. The tournament had been criticised by opposition groups as an attempt to advance Doumbouya's "illegal and inappropriate candidacy" in upcoming presidential elections. Between 20,000 and 30,000 spectators were in attendance, which was "much larger than the stadium's capacity".

In the 82nd minute of the match, the referee controversially gave a red card to a Labé player and a penalty to Nzérékoré. Fans of Labé swarmed the field and threw stones. According to local media, security personnel then used tear gas in an attempt to disperse the crowd. Spectators began to flee the stadium, heading to the structure's two exits. This led to a stampede and a crowd crush in and around the gates to the stadium, where many of the casualties occurred. Other spectators scaled the stadium walls to escape, with some deaths being reported from falls. Children were reportedly among those killed.

The dead and injured were brought to the Nzérékoré regional hospital, where doctors were reportedly overwhelmed. Soldiers were posted at the hospital to discourage family members of the victims from swarming the facilities. Due to overcrowding, some families opted to have victims moved to private clinics.

As of 3 December, 56 deaths have been confirmed by the government. A collective of civil society groups said at least 135 people were killed, citing information from hospitals, witnesses and relatives. More than 50 others are believed to be unaccounted for. The High Council of the Diaspora, a group of Guineans living abroad, released a statement claiming the incident had led to 300 deaths, with hundreds more injured. Due to varying reports on the scale of the tragedy, the Guinean government warned that anyone publishing “unverified or malicious information” about the incident would face arrest.

February 14, 2025, the collective of human rights organizations presented the results of the investigation which reported 140 dead, 11 missing and several injured.

== Aftermath ==
Following the incident, rioters set fire to the police station of Nzérékoré. Internet access to the region was restricted.

On 2 December, a number of people moved to leave the city for the towns and villages surrounding Nzérékoré. Checkpoints were set up throughout the city and most stores were closed. Many schools were closed, or teachers did not come to work. Churches and mosques remained open.

Schools and shops were again closed on 3 December. According to local journalists, at least 25 burials of victims had occurred by 3 December.

The Guinean Football Federation and the Confédération Africaine de Football (CAF) sent condolences to the victims' families.

On 12 December, Amnesty International called for an "independent and impartial" investigation.

=== Government response ===
Prime minister Bah Oury announced an investigation into the disaster and expressed condolences to families of the victims. The opposition National Alliance for Change and Democracy attributed "significant responsibility for these grave events" to authorities.

On the evening of 2 December, a government delegation visited the city and met with some of the victims' families.

Three days of mourning were held from 3 December.

== See also ==
- List of human stampedes and crushes:
  - Hillsborough disaster – a similar disaster at a football game in the United Kingdom in 1989 due to police failings rather than supporters' behavior.
  - Port Said Stadium riot – a similar disaster in Egypt in 2012 that involved the use of tear gas toward rioting supporters.
  - Kanjuruhan Stadium disaster – a similar disaster in Indonesia in which rioting football fans were tear gassed by police.
