= Espoir =

Espoir, a French word meaning "hope", may refer to:

- Man's Hope (French: L'Espoir), a 1937 novel by André Malraux
- Espoir: Sierra de Teruel, a 1938–1939 French film, released in 1945, based on Malraux's novel
- L'Espoir (album), a 1974 album by Léo Ferré
- Espoir (ship), several French vessels captured by the British during the French Revolutionary and Napoleonic Wars
- L'Espoir (newspaper), a 1944–1945 clandestine newspaper of the French Resistance; see Underground media in German-occupied France
- Espoir FC (disambiguation), several association football clubs
