= Barry Lelouma =

Guinean footballer

Personal information
- Full name: Alpha Oumar Lelouma Barry
- Date of birth: 4 April 1994 (age 32)
- Place of birth: Guinea
- Height: 1.76 m (5 ft 9 1/2 in)
- Position: Forward

Team information
- Current team: ACDC
- Number: 10

Youth career
- FC Michel
- Zaragoza FC
- ASEC de Conakry
- Lelou FC de Lélouma

Senior career*
| Years | Team | Apps | (Gls) |
- Lelou FC de Lélouma
- Espoir de Labé
- Hafia
- Bangkok Christian College
| 2013 | BEC Tero Sasana | | |
| 2014–2015 | Nagaworld | | |
| 2016 | Look Isan 2 | | |
| 2016 | Bangkok Christian College | | |
| 2017 | Nara United | 22 | (7) |
| 2017 | Kasem Bundit University | | |
| 2018 | Southern Myanmar | | |
| 2019 | Chamchuri United | 22 | (7) |
| 2020 | Kirivong Sok Sen Chey | 16 | (4) |
| 2021 | Soltilo Angkor | 4 | (1) |
| 2021–2022 | Pattani | 10 | (5) |
| 2022 | Ranong United | 10 | (0) |
| 2023 | Maejo United | 10 | (1) |
| 2023 | Yala | 11 | (1) |
| 2024– | ACDC | 0 | (0) |
- * Club domestic league appearances and goals

Alpha Oumar Lelouma Barry is a Guinean professional footballer who plays for Thai club ACDC in the Thai League 3 as a striker. He is yet to represent Guinea internationally and intends to continue his career in Europe.

== Career ==
=== Cambodia ===
Occupying Nagaworld's foreign slot for the 2014 and 2015 seasons, Lelouma was the first Guinean in the Cambodian League, and was called "Barry" by the fans. Over the course of his time there, he racked more than 10 goals each season including a hat-trick when Naga crushed Western 5–0 in 2014 and four goals in an 8–0 rout of the same team in 2015 before his contract expired at the end of 2015.

=== Thailand ===
Told by a so-called "player agent" that he had come to terms with a Malaysian side, the agent actually arranged fake deals for ingenuous African footballers and was never caught for his turpitude. Marooned in Malaysia, the frontman found someone who advised him to continue his career in Thailand where he successfully trialed for Bangkok Christian College through a friend, finishing 3rd despite finding hard to adjust with the high expectations for foreigners. For the U19 Championship, he was recruited by the Thai League 1's BEC Tero Sasana where he reached the U19 final, getting the better of opponents BBCU and finished top scorer. Penciling in a move to Look Isan in 2016 through Guinean Ousmane Cherif the Guinean scored when they overcame Pattaya 1–0 to qualify for the 2016 Thai League Cup but separated with them mid-season.

=== Myanmar ===
Decided on a one-year contract with Southern Myanmar for the 2018 Myanmar National League.

== Personal life ==
The goalscorer's father died in 2016.
