= 2005 CAF Confederation Cup group stage =

The group stage of the 2005 CAF Confederation Cup was played from 23 July to 16 October 2005. A total of eight teams competed in the group stage.

== Format ==
In the group stage, each group was played on a home-and-away round-robin basis. The winners of each group advanced directly to the final.

Key to colours in group tables
Group winners advance to the final

== Groups ==
=== Group A ===
Team	Pts	Pld	W	D	L	GF	GA	GD	
(Morocco) FAR Rabat	16	6	5	1	0	7	2	+5	Final
(Ghana) King Faisal Babes	12	6	4	0	2	9	5	+4	
(Tunisia) AS Marsa	7	6	2	1	3	6	6	0	
(Guinea) Fello Star	0	6	0	0	6	2	11	-9	

Team 1	Score	Team 2
AS Marsa (Tunisia)	0–0	(Morocco) FAR Rabat
Fello Star (Guinea)	0–1	(Ghana) King Faisal Babes
King Faisal Babes (Ghana)	1–0	(Tunisia) AS Marsa
FAR Rabat (Morocco)	1–0	(Guinea) Fello Star
Fello Star (Guinea)	1–2	(Tunisia) AS Marsa
King Faisal Babes (Ghana)	1–2	(Morocco) FAR Rabat
AS Marsa (Tunisia)	3–1	(Guinea) Fello Star
FAR Rabat (Morocco)	2–1	(Ghana) King Faisal Babes
FAR Rabat (Morocco)	1–0	(Tunisia) AS Marsa
King Faisal Babes (Ghana)	2–0	(Guinea) Fello Star
AS Marsa (Tunisia)	1–2	(Ghana) King Faisal Babes
Fello Star (Guinea)	0–1	(Morocco) FAR Rabat

=== Group B ===
Team	Pts	Pld	W	D	L	GF	GA	GD	
(Nigeria) Dolphins FC	14	6	4	2	0	10	4	+6	Final
(Egypt) Ismaily	11	6	3	2	1	11	4	+7	
(Egypt) Al-Mokawloon Al-Arab	6	6	2	0	4	6	8	-2	
(Gabon) FC 105 Libreville	3	6	1	0	5	4	15	-11	

Team 1	Score	Team 2
FC 105 Libreville (Gabon)	0–1	(Egypt) Ismaily
Dolphins FC (Nigeria)	2–1	(Egypt) Al-Mokawloon Al-Arab
Ismaily (Egypt)	1–1	(Nigeria) Dolphins FC
Al-Mokawloon Al-Arab (Egypt)	2–1	(Gabon) FC 105 Libreville
Al-Mokawloon Al-Arab (Egypt)	2–3	(Egypt) Ismaily
Dolphins FC (Nigeria)	3–0	(Gabon) FC 105 Libreville
Ismaily (Egypt)	0–1	(Egypt) Al-Mokawloon Al-Arab
FC 105 Libreville (Gabon)	2–3	(Nigeria) Dolphins FC
Al-Mokawloon (Egypt)	0–1	(Nigeria) Dolphins FC
Ismaily (Egypt)	6–0	(Gabon) FC 105 Libreville
FC 105 Libreville (Gabon)	1–0	(Egypt) Al-Mokawloon Al-Arab
Dolphins FC (Nigeria)	0–0	(Egypt) Ismaily
