= Mourad Lemsen =

Moroccan footballer

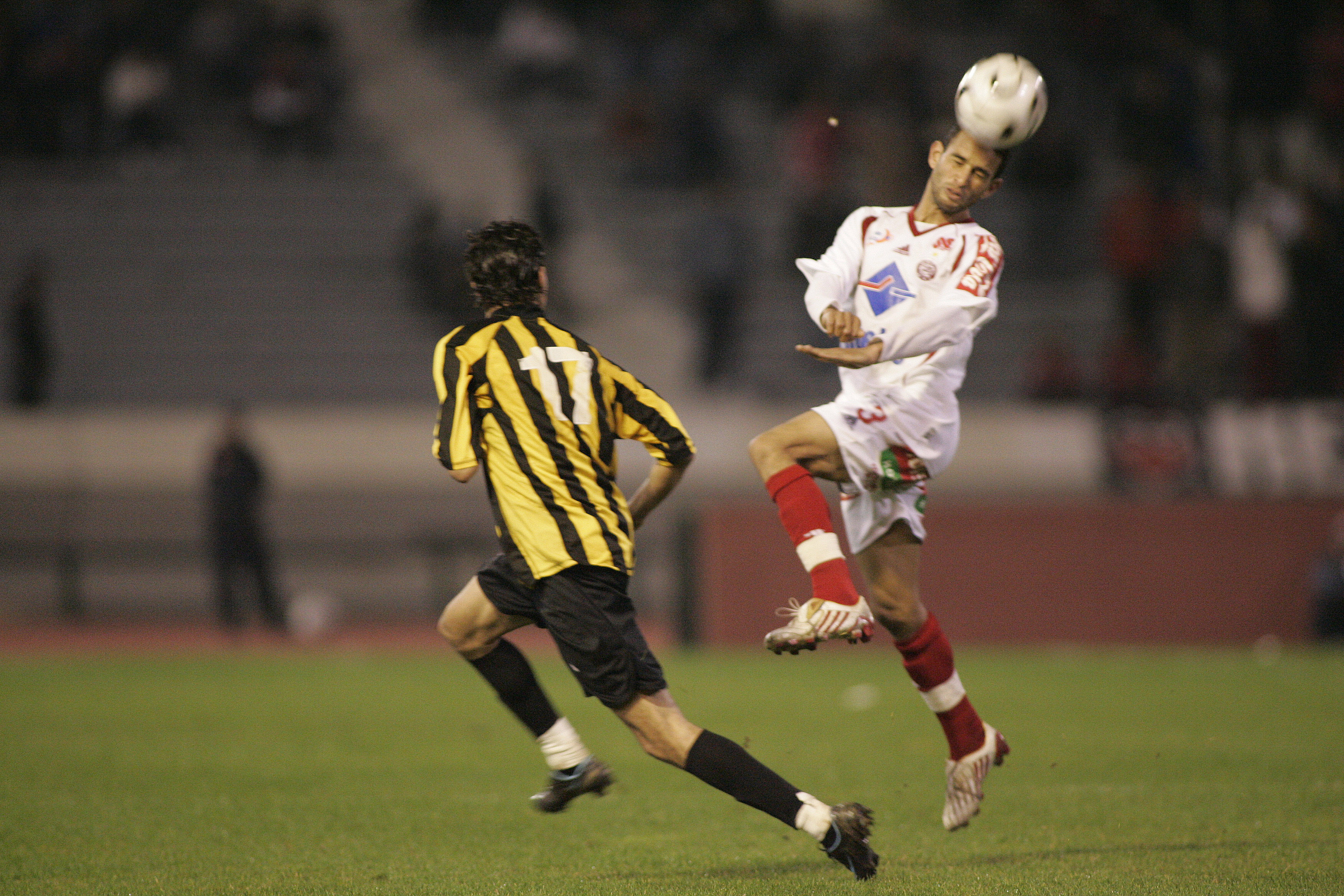
Wydad Casablanca vs Ittihad Khemisset, December 07 2008-03.jpg

Mourad Lemsen(Arabic: مراد المسن; born 1 February 1980), is a Moroccan footballer. He usually plays as defender.

== Career ==
Lemsen plays football for Wydad Casablanca. He helped the club reach the 2011 CAF Champions League Final, but was sent off in the return leg as Espérance Sportive de Tunis won the title.
