= Espoir FC =

Espoir FC may refer to several association football clubs:

- Espoir FC (Benin)
- Espoir FC (Niger)
- Espoir F.C. (Rwanda)
- Espoir FC de Mutimbuzi, Burundi
- Espoir de Labé, or Espoir FC, Guinea

== See also ==
- Espoir Sportif de Jerba Midoun, Tunisia
- Espoir Tsevie, Togo
- Espoir de Saint-Louis, a defunct Senegalese club that merged with AS Saint-Louisienne to form ASC Linguère
