= Houcine Zidoune =

Moroccan footballer (born 1990)

Personal information
- Date of birth: 12 March 1990 (age 36)
- Place of birth: Morocco
- Position: Midfielder

Senior career*
Years	Team	Apps	(Gls)
2008–2011	Wydad AC		
2011–2013	Olympic Safi		
2013	Aalesunds FK	5	(1)
2014	Olympic Safi		
2014–2016	Kénitra AC		
2016–2019	CR Bernoussi		
- * Club domestic league appearances and goals

Houcine Zidoune (Arabic: حسين زيدون; born 12 March 1990) is a Moroccan former footballer who played as a midfielder.

== Early life ==
Zidoune has been friends with Morocco international Abderrazak Hamdallah.

== Career ==
Zidoune played for Norwegian side Aalesunds FK. He was described as "played great until he received a red card in his debut against Tromsø, and created great expectations. Since then, he has struggled to find his way back to the same level".

== Style of play ==
Zidoune mainly operated as a midfielder and was described as a "balancing midfielder, who covers large spaces and is good with the ball".

== Personal life ==
Zidoune has suffered from fear of flying. He speaks French.
