= Josiah Maduabuchi =

Nigerian footballer

Personal information
- Date of birth: 16 April 1988 (age 38)
- Place of birth: Lagos, Nigeria
- Height: 1.70 m (5 ft 7 in)
- Position: Midfielder

Team information
- Current team: Lobi Stars F.C.

Youth career
- 2001–2003: Wikki Tourists

Senior career*
Years	Team	Apps	(Gls)
2004–2006	Wikki Tourists	39	(9)
2007–2013	Enyimba	47	(19)
2014	Warri Wolves		
2015–	Lobi Stars		
- * Club domestic league appearances and goals

Josiah Maduabuchi (born 16 April 1988) is a Nigerian footballer who plays as a midfielder for Lobi Stars.

== Club career ==
Maduabuchi was born in Lagos. He began his career with Wikki Tourists F.C. and joined Enyimba International in 2007.

He joined Lobi Stars in 2015.

== International career ==
On 15 April 2010, Maduabuchi earned his first call-up for the Nigeria national team and was part of the training camp for the 2010 FIFA World Cup in South Africa.

== Playing style ==
Maduabuchi plays as a versatile central attacking midfielder.
