= Robert Sankara =

Burkinabé international footballer (born 1985)

Personal information
- Date of birth: 18 February 1985 (age 41)
- Place of birth: Abidjan, Ivory Coast
- Height: 1.84 m (6 ft 1/2 in)
- Position: Central defender

Team information
- Current team: Free State Stars
- Number: 18

Senior career*
Years	Team	Apps	(Gls)
2009–2010	Stade d'Abidjan		
2011–2012	ASEC Mimosas		
2012–2013	Denguélé		
2013–2014	Al-Hilal		
2014–	Free State Stars	25	(2)

International career^{‡}
2012	Burkina Faso	1	(0)
- * Club domestic league appearances and goals as of 19:18, 26 May 2015 (UTC) ‡ National team caps and goals as of 12:52, 21 December 2014 (UTC)

Robert Sankara (born 18 February 1985) is a Burkinabé international footballer who plays for South African club Free State Stars, as a central defender

== Club career ==
Born in Abidjan, Ivory Coast, Sankara has played club football for Stade d'Abidjan, ASEC Mimosas, Denguélé, Al-Hilal and Free State Stars.

== International career ==
He made his international debut for Burkina Faso in 2012.
