= Mohamed Berrabeh =

Moroccan international footballer

Personal information
- Full name: Mohamed Berrabeh
- Date of birth: 2 October 1985 (age 41)
- Place of birth: Berkane, Morocco
- Height: 1.78 m (5 ft 10 in)
- Position: Midfielder

Team information
- Current team: Wydad Casablanca
- Number: 10

Youth career
- –2003: Nahdat Berkane

Senior career*
Years	Team	Apps	(Gls)
2003–2004	Nahdat Berkane		
2004–2007	MC Oujda		
2008–2009	Ajman Club		
2009–2010	Wydad Casablanca	25	(0)
2010	Al Dhafra	9	(2)
2011–2015	Wydad Casablanca	80	(4)
2015–2016	RS Berkane		
2017	FC AMMYS NIJMEGEN		

International career^{‡}
2006–2008	Morocco U23	2	(0)
2009–	Morocco	10	(0)
- * Club domestic league appearances and goals as of 26 May 2014 ‡ National team caps and goals as of 26 January 2015 (UTC)

Mohamed Berrabeh (Arabic: محمد برابح – born 2 October 1985, Berkane) is a Moroccan international footballer who plays as a midfielder for the Moroccan Botola side Wydad Casablanca since signing for them back in 2009 from Mouloudia Oujda.
