= Abderrahmane Mssassi =

Moroccan footballer (born 1985)

Personal information
- Full name: Abderrahmane Mssassi
- Date of birth: 24 March 1985 (age 41)
- Place of birth: Fez, Morocco
- Height: 1.84 m (6 ft 0 in)
- Position: Defender

Senior career*
Years	Team	Apps	(Gls)
2004–2007	Maghreb de Fès		
2007–2010	FAR Rabat	12	(1)
2010–2012	Wydad Casablanca	18	(1)
2012–2014	Maghreb de Fès	14	(2)

International career
2003–2005	Morocco U20	9	(0)
2006–2008	Morocco U23	7	(0)
- * Club domestic league appearances and goals

Abderrahmane Mssassi (born 24 March 1985) is a Moroccan former professional footballer who played as a defender.

== Club career ==
Mssassi spotted by scouts from Maghreb de Fès during a youth tournament. He played at all youth levels until 2004 when he made his first-team debut. In August 2006, he went on trial with Scottish club Dundee United, but ultimately failed to win a contract.

During the 2007 summer transfer window, he was signed by FAR Rabat. In July 2010, he signed a three-year contract with Wydad Casablanca. Then he returned to his first club Maghreb de Fès in 2012.

Mssassi joined Wydad from FAR Rabat in the summer of 2010. In May 2011, Abderahmane Msassi was given a six match ban and fined US$15,000 by CAF for spitting at the referee during the game.

== International career ==
Mssassi played for Morocco at the 2005 FIFA World Youth Championship in the Netherlands.
