= Jabulani Maluleke =

South African soccer player

Personal information
- Full name: Jabulani Percy Maluleke
- Date of birth: 17 March 1982 (age 44)
- Place of birth: Soweto, South Africa
- Position: Midfielder

Team information
- Current team: Sekhukhune United
- Number: 8

Senior career*
Years	Team	Apps	(Gls)
- Dynamos
–2005	Dangerous Darkies		
2005–2009	Black Leopards	57	(4)
2009–2014	SuperSport United	90	(9)
2014	→ Polokwane City (loan)	10	(0)
2014–2020	Polokwane City	164	(21)
2020–2021	Sekhukhune United	21	(1)
2022	Venda	2	(0)
- * Club domestic league appearances and goals as of 11 November 2022

Jabulani Maluleke (born 17 March 1982 in Soweto) is a South African football (soccer) midfielder.
