= Espoir de Labé =

Guinean football club

- Full name: Club Espoir de Labé
- Founded: 1984
- Ground: Stade Saïfoulaye Diallo; Labé, Guinea
- Capacity: 5,000
- League: Guinée Championnat National

Espoir de Labé is a football club from Labé in the West African, state of Guinea. They play in the Guinée Championnat National, which is the highest league in Guinean football.

== Stadium ==
Currently the team plays at the 5000 capacity Stade Saïfoulaye Diallo.
