= Youssef Mouihbi =

Former Tunisian footballer

Personal information
- Date of birth: April 1, 1985 (age 41)
- Place of birth: La Marsa, Tunisia
- Height: 1.79 m (5 ft 10 in)
- Position: Attacking midfielder

Youth career
- 1993—2004: AS Marsa

Senior career*
Years	Team	Apps	(Gls)
2004—2006	AS Marsa	19	(5)
2006—2012	Club Africain	75	(19)
2012—2013	Al-Qadsiah		
2013—2014	AS Marsa	14	(2)
2014—2016	ES Sahel	48	(14)
2016—2017	Al-Ahed SC	11	(1)
2017—2019	AS Marsa		

International career
2008—2015	Tunisia	7	(0)
- * Club domestic league appearances and goals

Youssef Mouihbi (Arabic: يوسف المويهبي, born 1 April 1985 in Tunisia) is a retired Tunisian footballer who played attacking midfielder for 5 professional teams, including AS Marsa and Club Africain, and the Tunisia national football team.

Mouihbi played for AS Marsa Football Academy Academy beginning in 1993 before going professional with the club in 2004. He played for Marsa until 2006, when he signed with Club Africain. He played in the CAF Champions League while there and helped win Tunisian Ligue during the 2007—2008 season. He left Africain six years later and moved to Kuwait to play for Al-Qadsiah in Kuwait. He returned to Tunisia a year later and re-signed with AS Marsa. In 2014, he joined ES Sahel and earned his coaching license from the Confederation of African Football. He was part of the teams that won the CAF Confederation Cup and the 2013—2014 and 2014—2015 Tunisian Cups. He stayed with Sahel for two seasons before going abroad again, this time to Lebanon to play for Al-Ahed SC. While there, he helped win the 2016–17 Lebanese Premier League. In 2017, he again returned to Marsa. He worked with the organization to establish Mouihbi Académie, a football school for kids. He retired in 2019.

After retiring, Mouihbi finished his Baccalauréat degree in economics and management, which he set aside in 2004 to pursue football professionally. He expressed interest in enrolling in University of Jendouba's Higher Institute of Sport and Physical Education but was unable to do so while playing professionally.
