= Sibusiso Dlamini =

Liswati footballer

Personal information
- Full name: Sibusiso Barnabas Dlamini
- Date of birth: 1 September 1980 (age 46)
- Place of birth: Mbabane, Swaziland
- Position: Striker

Senior career*
Years	Team	Apps	(Gls)
1998–2000	Royal Leopards	49	(17)
2000–2001	Mamelodi Sundowns		
2000–2001	Mamelodi Sundowns	1	(0)
2001–2003	Black Leopards	45	(16)
2003–2004	Kaizer Chiefs	21	(6)
2004–2006	Black Leopards	18	(1)
2006–2007	Moroka Swallows	11	(0)
2007–2008	Black Leopards	16	(0)
2008–2011	Mpumalanga Black Aces		
2012–2014	Malanti Chiefs		

International career
1998–2007	Swaziland MNT	20	(3)
- * Club domestic league appearances and goals

Sibusiso Barnabas Dlamini (born 1 September 1980) is a Liswati former footballer who played as a striker. He has been capped for Eswatini.
