= Abderrahim Benkajjane =

French footballer (born 1983)

Personal information
- Date of birth: 1 June 1983 (age 43)
- Place of birth: Saint-Dié-des-Vosges, France
- Height: 1.84 m (6 ft 0 in)
- Position: Defender

Team information
- Current team: Khénifra

Senior career*
| Years | Team | Apps | (Gls) |
| 2002–2007 | Raon-l'Étape | 89 | (3) |
| 2007–2008 | Feignies | ? | (?) |
| 2008–2009 | KAC Marrakech | ? | (?) |
| 2009–2013 | Wydad Casablanca | 46 | (2) |
| 2013–2014 | Khaitan | ? | (?) |
| 2014–2016 | MAS Fez | 17 | (1) |
| 2016– | Khénifra | | |
- * Club domestic league appearances and goals

Abderrahim Benkajjane (born 1 June 1983) is a French professional footballer who currently plays as a defender for Moroccan Botola side Khénifra. He was born in Saint-Dié-des-Vosges, France, and started his career in the lower leagues with Raon-l'Étape where he played alongside his older brother Hassan. He transferred to Feignies in 2007 before moving to Morocco the following year to join KAC Marrakech. In the summer of 2009, Benkajjane was signed by Wydad Casablanca.
