= Stade du 3 Avril =

Football stadium in Nzérékoré, southern Guinea

- Interactive map of Stade du 3 Avril
- Full name: Stade du 3 Avril
- Location: Nzérékoré, Guinea
- Coordinates: 7°45′29″N 8°49′03″W

Stade du 3 Avril is a football stadium in Nzérékoré, southern Guinea. It is the only stadium in Nzérékoré Prefecture.

In August 2023, the stadium hosted a tournament between 20 regional clubs.

The venue has been in poor quality for multiple years. Renovation work started on the stadium in 2008, but was later halted, in part due to political instability. The stadium was reported to have a muddy field, half-finished roof, unfinished stands, and unbuilt bathroom facilities and ticket offices. Although athletes continued to train and play in the stadium, the structure was also reported to be used by local drug users.

Local authorities had been trying for years to secure funding to improve the structure.

== 1 December 2024 stampede ==
On 1 December 2024, a stampede and crowd crush at the stadium resulted in at least 56 deaths. Civil society groups said at least 135 people died, most of them children.
