= Ahmed Ajeddou =

Moroccan football midfielder

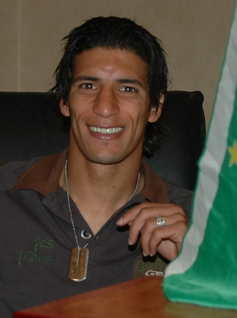

Personal information
- Full name: Ahmed Ajeddou
- Date of birth: January 1, 1980 (age 46)
- Place of birth: Marrakesh, Morocco
- Height: 1.72 m (5 ft 8 in)
- Position: Midfielder

Team information
- Current team: US Amal Tiznit

Senior career*
Years	Team	Apps	(Gls)
2003–2006	FAR Rabat	?	(?)
2006–2007	→ Al-Wakrah (loan)	?	(?)
2008–2009	Al-Ahly Tripoli	?	(?)
2009–2012	Wydad Casablanca	64	(6)
2012–2014	MAS Fez	28	(3)
2014–	FAR Rabat	4	(0)

International career^{‡}
2004–2011	Morocco	6	(1)
- * Club domestic league appearances and goals as of 31 March 2014 ‡ National team caps and goals as of 18 October 2008

Ahmed Ajeddou (Arabic: أحمد أجدو) (born January 1, 1980, in Morocco) is a Moroccan football midfielder. He currently plays for FAR Rabat in Morocco.

Ajeddou played for FAR in the 2007 CAF Champions League group stages.

He made his first cap for Morocco national football team in the friendly match against USA on 23 May 2008.

== International career ==
=== International goals ===
Scores and results list Morocco's goal tally first.

No	Date	Venue	Opponent	Score	Result	Competition
1.	18 February 2004	Prince Moulay Abdellah Stadium, Rabat, Morocco	Switzerland	1–0	2–1	Friendly
