= Valentine Nwabili =

Nigerian footballer

Personal information
- Date of birth: 17 March 1987 (age 39)
- Position: Left back

Team information
- Current team: FC Agniputhra

Senior career*
| Years | Team | Apps | (Gls) |
| 2005 | Sharks | | |
| 2005–2006 | Espérance | 1 | (0) |
| 2006–2007 | Le Havre | 0 | (0) |
| 2007–2008 | Espérance | 0 | (0) |
| 2008–2011 | Enyimba | | |
| 2011–2012 | Al-Hilal | | |
| 2013–2014 | Niger Tornadoes | | |
| 2015–2016 | Abia Warriors | | |
| 2017 | Ifeanyi Ubah | | |
| 2022– | FC Agniputhra | | |

International career
| 2010 | Nigeria | 2 | (0) |
- * Club domestic league appearances and goals

Valentine Nwabili (born 17 March 1987) is a Nigerian professional footballer who plays for Indian club FC Agniputhra as a left back.

== Career ==
Nwabili played club football in Nigeria, Tunisia, France and Sudan for Sharks, Espérance, Le Havre, Enyimba, Al-Hilal, Niger Tornadoes, Abia Warriors and Ifeanyi Ubah He joined Abia Warriors in March 2015.

In September 2022 he was playing for Indian club FC Agniputhra.

He earned two international caps for Nigeria in 2010.
