= Janvier Besala Bokungu =

Congolese football Defender

Janvier Bokungu
Personal information
- Full name: Janvier Besala Bokungu
- Date of birth: 30 January 1989 (age 37)
- Place of birth: Cilu, Zaire
- Height: 1.77 m (5 ft 10 in)
- Position: Defender

Team information
- Current team: Espérance

Senior career*
Years	Team	Apps	(Gls)
2004–2006	DC Virunga		
2005–2008	TP Mazembe		
2008–	Espérance		

International career
2007–	DR Congo	9	(0)
- * Club domestic league appearances and goals as of 18 January 2008

Janvier Besala Bokungu (born 30 January 1989) is a Congolese association football defender. He currently plays for Espérance in Tunisia. He joined the club on 26 November 2007, from TP Mazembe.

== Successes ==
- 2007 CAF- Semi-finals with TP Mazembe
- 2007 League Winner with TP Mazembe
