= Enyimba International Stadium =

Multi-use stadium in Nigeria

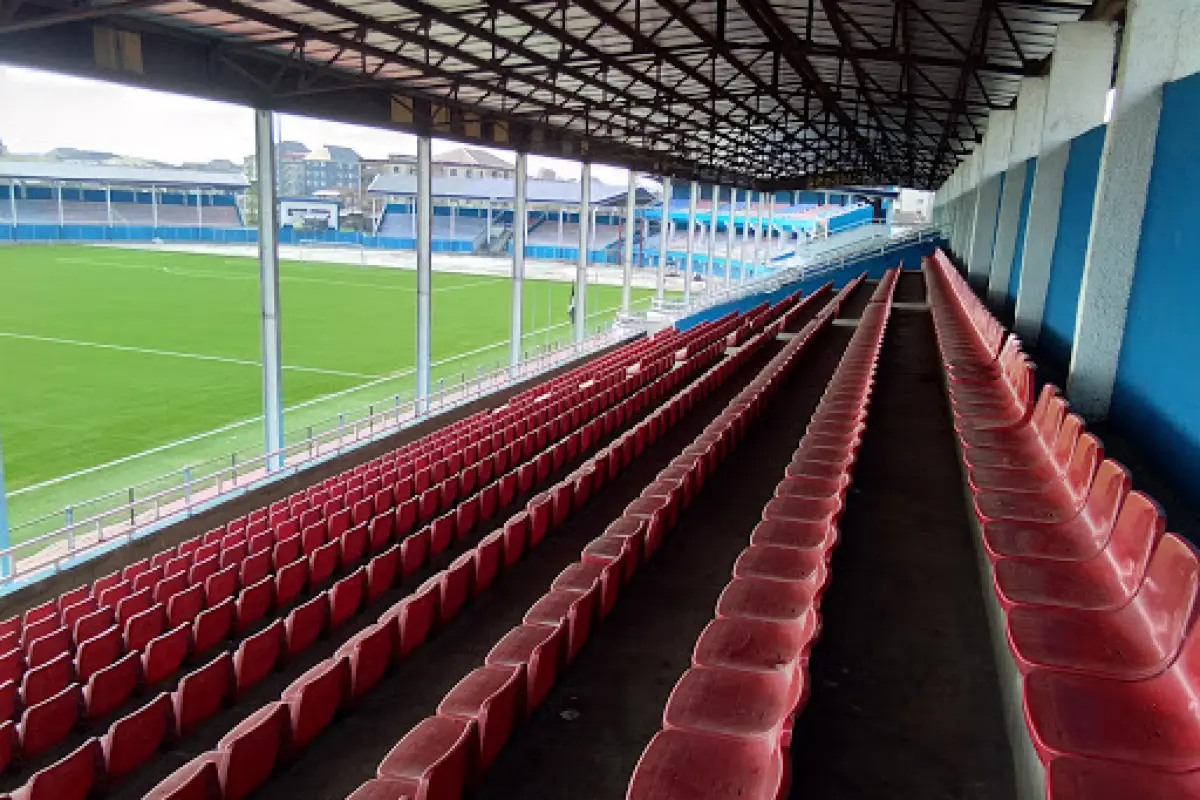
- Interactive map of Enyimba International Stadium
- Address: Dan Fodio Road; Aba; Nigeria
- Coordinates: 5°06′07″N 7°22′33″E
- Capacity: 16,000

Construction
- Renovated: 2018

The Enyimba International Stadium is a multi-use stadium in Aba, Nigeria. It is currently used mostly for football matches and serves as the home ground of Enyimba F.C. Following renovations in 2018, the stadium holds 16,000 people. Enyimba have been crowned Nigerian football champions several times. Enyimba FC drew an average home attendance of 3,496 in the 2023-24 edition of the NPFL.

== See also ==
- Lists of stadiums
