= Jacques Haman =

Cameroonian footballer

Personal information
- Full name: Jacques Haman
- Date of birth: 30 August 1994 (age 32)
- Place of birth: Garoua, Cameroon
- Height: 1.88 m (6 ft 2 in)
- Position: Centre forward

Team information
- Current team: Al-Hussein SC (Irbid)
- Number: 9

Youth career
- –2010: Coton Sport

Senior career*
Years	Team	Apps	(Gls)
2010–2015	Coton Sport	87	(39)
2015–2016	FC Montreal	11	(3)
2016–2017	Vitória Guimarães B	50	(9)
2018	Leixões	9	(0)
2018-2019	Varzim	15	(1)
2019	Ilves	7	(0)
2021-2022	Al-Madina SC	12	(06)
2022-	Al-Hussein SC (Irbid)		

International career^{‡}
2013–	Cameroon	2	(1)
- * Club domestic league appearances and goals as of 8 August 2019 ‡ National team caps and goals as of 20 July 2021

Jacques Haman is a Cameroonian footballer who plays as a centre forward for Al-Hussein SC (Irbid) in the Jordani League.

== Honours ==
=== Coton Sport ===
- Cameroon Division 1-Elite One Champion: 2010/11, 2013
