= Pascal Angan =

Ivorian-Beninese footballer

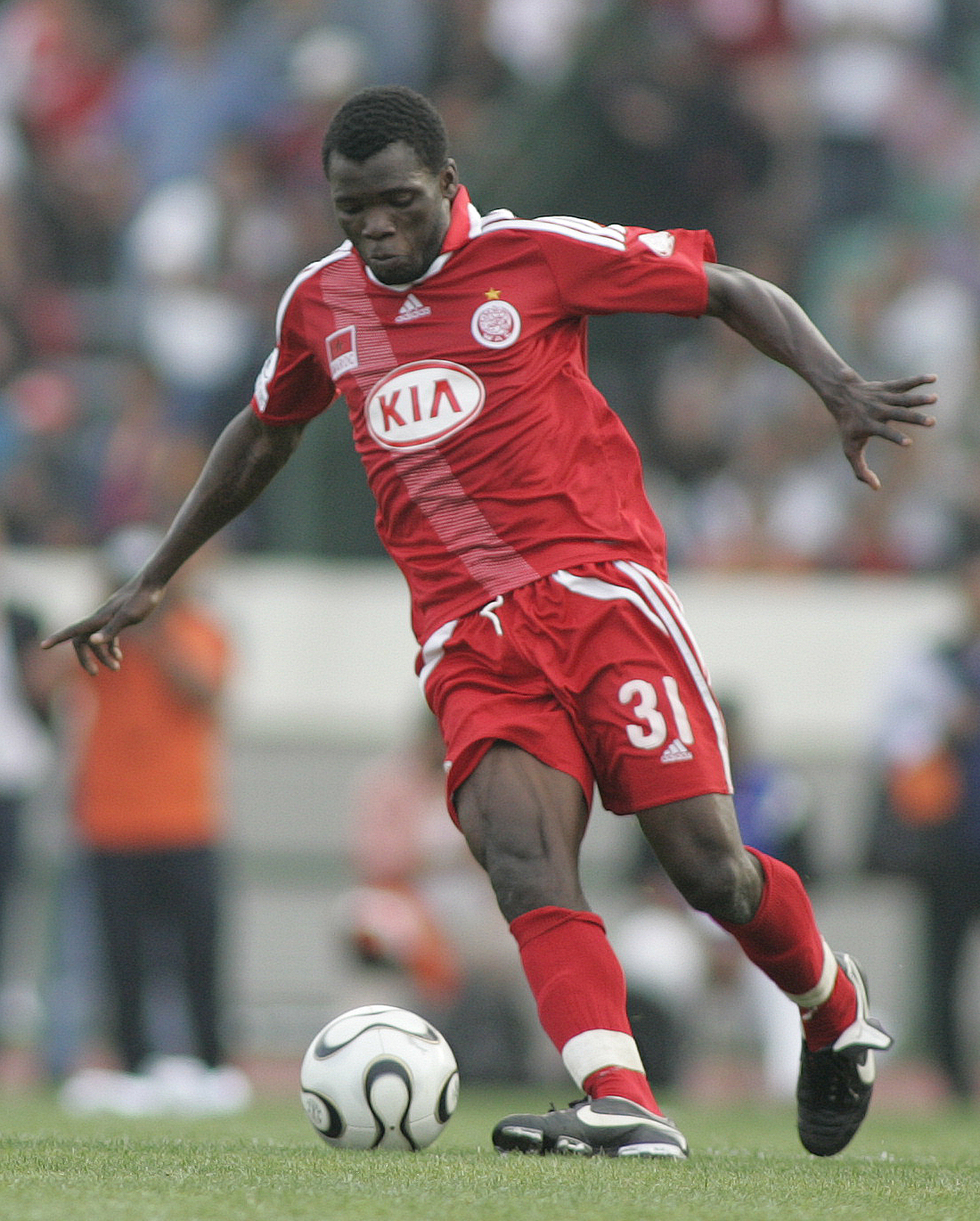

Personal information
- Full name: Jean Louis Pascal Angan
- Date of birth: 19 April 1986 (age 40)
- Place of birth: Odienné, Ivory Coast
- Height: 1.78 m (5 ft 10 in)
- Position: Attacking midfielder

Youth career
- 2003–2005: AS Denguelé
- 2005–2006: Issia Wazi

Senior career*
Years	Team	Apps	(Gls)
2006–2008	Tonnerre d'Abomey	50	(10)
2008–2012	Wydad Casablanca	53	(7)
2012–2013	CR Belouizdad	23	(2)
2013–2014	Ismaily		
2014	Al-Nasr Kuwait		

International career^{‡}
2007	Benin U-21	7	(10)
2009–	Benin	12	(0)
- * Club domestic league appearances and goals as of 4 January 2016 ‡ National team caps and goals as of 00:00, July 19, 2013 (UTC)

Jean Louis Pascal Angan (born 19 April 1986, in Odienné) is an Ivorian-Beninese international football player who last played for Al-Nasr in Kuwait.

== Career ==
Angan began his career with AS Denguelé and joined later Issia Wazi. After a few years in the Ivory Coast, he joined Tonnerre d'Abomey FC. Angan played two years in Benin with Tonnerre d'Abomey FC and he moved to Wydad Casablanca in December 2008. He joined CR Belouizdad in July 2012.

== International career ==
The Ivorian-born player was called for the Benin U-21 team and made his debut for the senior team in May 2009.
