= Edward Sadomba =

Zimbabwean footballer (born 1983)

Personal information
- Full name: Edward Takarinda Sadomba
- Date of birth: 31 August 1983 (age 43)
- Place of birth: Harare, Zimbabwe
- Height: 1.70 m (5 ft 7 in)
- Position: Forward

Senior career*
Years	Team	Apps	(Gls)
2001–2002	Harare United		
2003–2004	Kambuzuma United		
2004–2006	Maritzburg United	10	(4)
2006–2008	Dynamos	30	(7)
2009	Liga Desportiva de Maputo	14	(0)
2009–2012	Al-Hilal	47	(30)
2012–2013	Al-Ittihad Kalba	10	(1)
2013–2014	Al-Ahly (Benghazi)		
2014–2015	Al-Ahli (Tripoli)		
2016	Al-Hilal		
2019	Dynamos		

International career
2006–2014	Zimbabwe	15	(1)

Managerial career
- 2019: Dynamos (caretaker)
- * Club domestic league appearances and goals

Edward Takarinda Sadomba (born 31 August 1983) is a Zimbabwean former professional footballer who played as a forward.

== Career ==
Born in Harare, Sadomba played for Harare United, Kambuzuma United, Maritzburg United, Dynamos, Liga Desportiva de Maputo, Al-Hilal, Al-Ittihad Kalba, Al-Ahly (Benghazi) and Al-Ahli (Tripoli).

He represented Zimbabwe between 2006 and 2014, scoring one goal in 15 appearances.

In January 2019, Sadomba returned from his retirement and signed with his former club Dynamos. After manager Lloyd Chigove was fired, Sadomba was appointed as Dynamos' caretaker manager alongside Richard Chihoro on 23 April 2019, before Tonderai Ndiraya was appointed as permanent manager at the end of that week.
