= Stade Régional Saifoullaye Diallo =

- Interactive map of Stade Régional Saifoullaye Diallo
- Full name: Stade Régional Saifoullaye Diallo
- Location: Labé, Guinea
- Coordinates: 11.3128°N 12.2705°W
- Capacity: 5,000

Tenant
- Fello Star

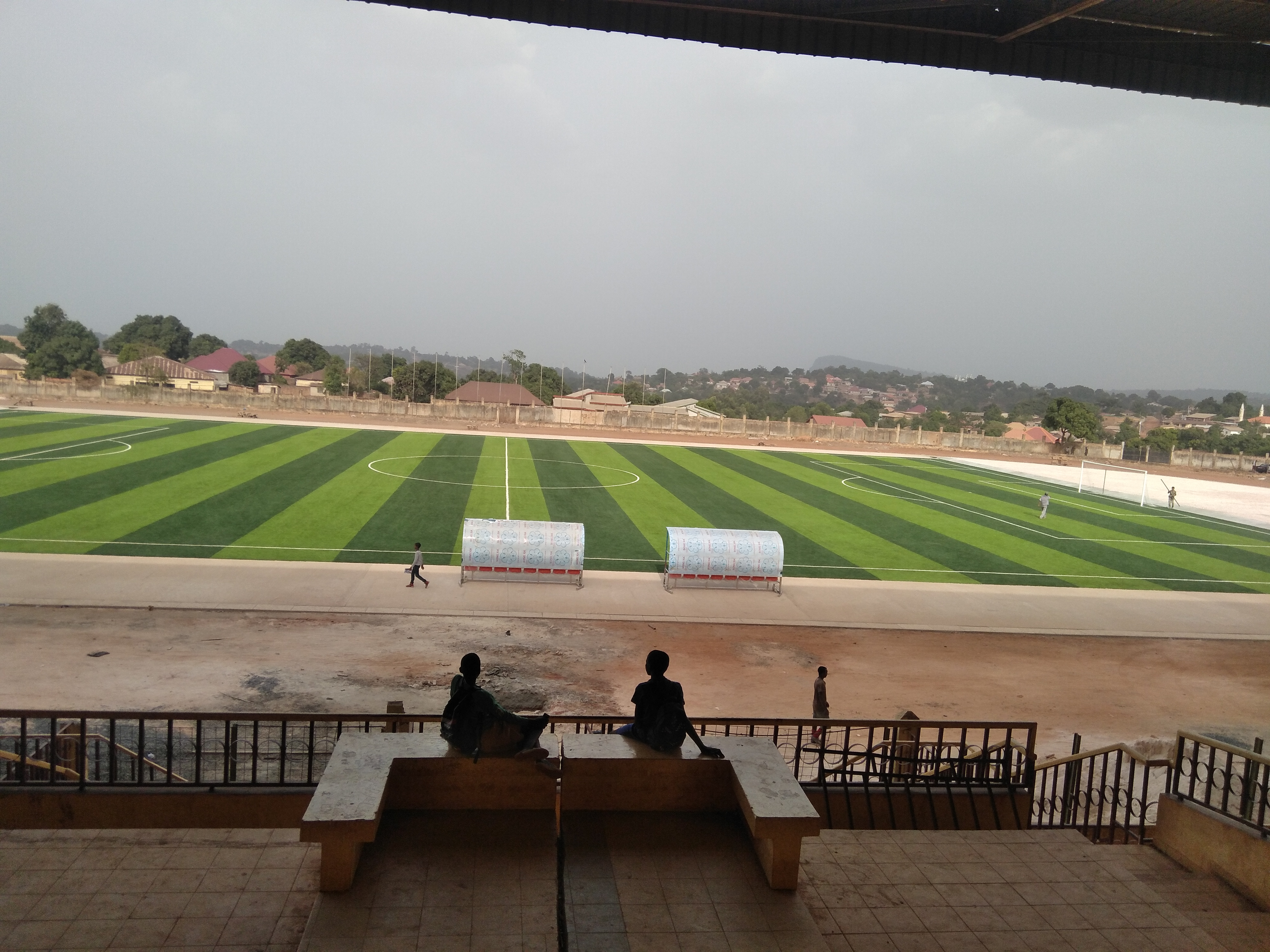
Stade de Labé.jpg

Stade Régional Saifoullaye Diallo is a multi-use stadium in Labé, Guinea. It is currently used mostly for football matches, on club level by Fello Star of the Guinée Championnat National. The stadium has a capacity of 5,000 spectators.
