= Fabrice Ondama =

Congolese footballer

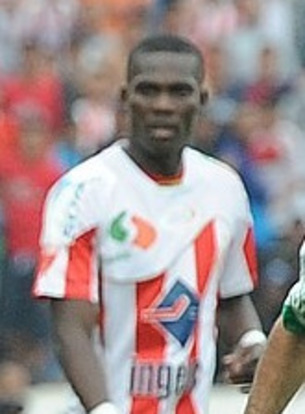

Personal information
- Full name: Fabrice N'Guessi Ondama
- Date of birth: 27 February 1988 (age 38)
- Place of birth: Ouenzé, Republic of the Congo
- Height: 1.78 m (5 ft 10 in)
- Position: Winger

Youth career
- 2001–2002: TP Mister
- 2003–2007: Stade M'Bombat La Mancha
- 2003–2004: → Étoile du Congo (loan)

Senior career*
Years	Team	Apps	(Gls)
2007–2009	Rennes B	25	(4)
2008–2009	→ Créteil (loan)	8	(0)
2009–2010	Diables Noirs		
2010–2012	Wydad Casablanca	29	(9)
2012–2013	Ittihad	5	(1)
2013–2017	Wydad Casablanca	108	(37)
2017	Club Africain	3	(0)
2019	Raja Beni Mellal		
2019	Youssoufia Berrechid		

International career
2006–2017	Congo	37	(5)
- * Club domestic league appearances and goals

Fabrice N'Guessi Ondama (born 27 February 1988) is a Congolese former professional footballer who played as a winger.

== Club career ==
Ondama was born in Ouenzé, Republic of the Congo.

On 2 January 2019, Ondama joined Raja Beni Mellal in Morocco. Later in the same month, he left the club again to join Club Athletic Youssoufia Berrechid.

== International career ==
Ondama earned his first cap for the Congo national team in the 2010 FIFA World Cup qualifying match against Mali on 7 September 2008.

He was selected in Congo's squad for the 2015 Africa Cup of Nations and scored the winning goal in a 2–1 defeat of Burkina Faso, to put the Diables Rouges into the quarter-finals for the first time since 1992.

== Career statistics ==
Scores and results list Congo's goal tally first, score column indicates score after each Ondama goal.

List of international goals scored by Fabrice Ondama
No.	Date	Venue	Opponent	Score	Result	Competition
1	6 October 2006	Stade Alphonse Massemba-Débat, Brazzaville, Republic of Congo	Chad	3–0	3–1	2008 Africa Cup of Nations qualification
2	29 February 2012	Stade Municipal, Pointe-Noire, Republic of Congo	Uganda	1–0	3–1	2013 Africa Cup of Nations qualification
3	7 September 2013	Stade Général-Seyni-Kountché, Niamey, Niger	Niger	2–2	2–2	2014 FIFA World Cup qualification
4	25 January 2015	Estadio de Bata, Bata, Equatorial Guinea	Burkina Faso	2–1	2–1	2015 Africa Cup of Nations
5	14 November 2015	Addis Ababa Stadium, Addis Ababa, Ethiopia	Ethiopia	2–1	4–3	2018 FIFA World Cup qualification

== Honours ==
Stade M'Bombat La Mancha

- Coupe du Congo: runner-up 2006

Wydad Casablanca

- Botola: 2014–15, 2016–17: runner-up 2015–16
- CAF Champions League: runner-up 2011

Individual

- 2007 African Youth Championship MVP
