= Fello Star =

Guinean football club

- Full name: Fello Star de Labé
- Founded: 1988
- Ground: Stade Saïfoulaye Diallo; Labé, Guinea
- Capacity: 5,000
- Chairman: Abdoulaye Konaté
- Manager: Djibril Diomandé
- League: Ligue 2
- 2024–2025: 2nd in Ligue 2 Group B
Home colours

Fello Star de Labé is a Guinean football club based in Labé. Their home games are played at Stade Saïfoulaye Diallo. Its logo and uniform colors are blue and black.

== Achievements ==
=== National ===
- Guinée Championnat National: 4

Winner: 2004 (championship cancelled due to financial problems), 2006, 2008, 2009, 2010

- Guinée Coupe Nationale: 2

Winner: 2000, 2004

- Guinée Super Coupe: 2

Winner: 2007, 2009

== Season to season ==
- 2013–14: 4th (First Division)
- 2014–15: 8th (First Division)
- 2015–16: 3rd (First Division)
- 2016–17: 8th (First Division)
- 2017–18: 7th (First Division)

== Performance in CAF competitions ==
- CAF Champions League: 5 appearances

2005 – Second Round

(Senegal) ASC Diaraf – Fello Star 0–1, 2–1
Fello Star – JS Kabylie 1–0, 0–0
(South Africa) Ajax Cape Town 2–2 (total) (2–3 pen.)

2007 – First Round

Fello Star – (Cape Verde) Sporting Clube da Praia 1–0, – (withdrew)^{1}
(Tunisia) Étoile du Sahel

2009 – Preliminary Round
2010 – Preliminary Round
2011 – Preliminary Round

(Burkina Faso) ASFA Yennenga

- CAF Confederation Cup: 1 appearance

2005 – Group Stage

(Ghana) King Faisal Babes
(Morocco) FAR Rabat

^{1}SC Praia did not visited Guinea due to the civil war and strife that occurred in the nation, the CAF awarded Fello Star 3–0
