= 2011 CAF Confederation Cup qualifying rounds =

- Dates: 28 January – 27 February 2011

These are the summaries of the international football matches in the qualifying rounds for the group stage of the 2011 CAF Confederation Cup.

The schedule for the tournament was released in October 2010, and the draw for the first three rounds was held in Cairo on 20 December 2010. The draw for the play-off round (together with the draw for the group stage) was held in Cairo on 15 May 2010.

Qualification ties were decided over two legs, with aggregate goals used to determine the winner. If the sides were level on aggregate after the second leg, the away goals rule applied, and if still level, the tie proceeded directly to a penalty shootout (no extra time is played).

== Preliminary round ==
This was a knock-out stage of the 40 teams that did not receive byes to the first round.

First legs: 28–30 January 2011; Second legs: 11–13 and 25–27 February 2011.

29 January 2011
16:30 UTC±00:00

| ASC Tevragh-Zeïna (Mauritania) | 0 – 0 | (Mali) AS Real Bamako |

Stade Olympique, Nouakchott
26 February 2011
16:30 UTC±00:00

| AS Real Bamako (Mali) | 0 – 1 | (Mauritania) ASC Tevragh-Zeïna |
|---|---|---|
| | Report | Ely Cheikh Ould Voulani 62' |

Stade Modibo Keïta, Bamako

ASC Tevragh-Zeïna won 1–0 on aggregate and advanced to the first round.

29 January 2011
15:00 UTC+01:00

| Missile (Gabon) | 4 – 0 | (Burundi) AS Inter Star |
|---|---|---|
| Azubike 27'; Poathy 35'; Kiende 43'; Claude Mvé Mintsa 90+2' | Report |

Stade Augustin Monédan de Sibang, Libreville
27 February 2011
15:30 UTC+02:00

| AS Inter Star (Burundi) | 1 – 0 | (Gabon) Missile |
|---|---|---|
| ? (?) | Report |

Prince Louis Rwagasore Stadium, Bujumbura

Missile won 4–1 on aggregate and advanced to the first round.

29 January 2011
15:30 UTC+01:00

| AC Léopards (Republic of the Congo) | 1 – 1 | (Rwanda) Etincelles |
|---|---|---|
| Michel de Buisson 17' (pen.) | Report | Iddy Nshimiyimana 20' |

Stade Omnisport Marien Ngouabi d'Owando, Brazzaville
12 February 2011
15:00 UTC+02:00

| Etincelles (Rwanda) | 0 – 2 | (Republic of the Congo) AC Léopards |
|---|---|---|
| | Report | Eric Nyamba 5'; Bienvenue Kombo 32' |

Umuganda Stadium, Gisenyi

AC Léopards won 3–1 on aggregate and advanced to the first round.

29 January 2011
18:00 UTC±00:00

| Touré Kunda Footpro (Senegal) | 2 – 1 | (Sierra Leone) Ports Authority F.C. |
|---|---|---|
| Tidiane Samb 27'; Ibrahima Diakhaté 61' (pen.) | Report | Morlai Sessay 51' |

Stade Demba Diop, Dakar
12 February 2011
16:30 UTC±00:00

| Ports Authority F.C. (Sierra Leone) | 2 – 2 | (Senegal) Touré Kunda Footpro |
|---|---|---|
| Morlai Sessay 30'; Donald Wellington 73' | Report | Cheikh Samb 25'; Becaye Kama 65' |

National Stadium, Freetown

Touré Kunda Footpro won 4–3 on aggregate and advanced to the first round.

28 January 2011
17:00 UTC+01:00

| CA Batna (Algeria) | 2 – 2 | (Libya) Al-Nasr |
|---|---|---|
| Amine Fezzani 46', 58' | Report | Khaled Hussein 38'; Charaf Eddine Attia 56' |

Seffouhi Stadium, Batna
Referee: Jiyed Redouane (Morocco)
11 February 2011
20:00 UTC+02:00

| Al-Nasr (Libya) | 2 – 2 | (Algeria) CA Batna |
|---|---|---|
| Anes Zagb 9'; Abobakr Rajeb 58' | Report | Messadia 5'; Bouchouk 36' |
Penalties
| | 6 – 5 |

Martyrs of February Stadium, Benghazi

4–4 on aggregate; Al-Nasr won on penalties and advanced to the first round.

30 January 2011
16:00 UTC±00:00

| Dynamic Togolais (Togo) | 0 – 0 | (Niger) Sahel SC |

Stade de Kégué, Lomé
27 February 2011
14:00 UTC+01:00

| Sahel SC (Niger) | 0 – 0 | (Togo) Dynamic Togolais |
Penalties
| | 4 – 2 |

Général Seyni Kountché Stadion, Niamey

0–0 on aggregate; Sahel SC won on penalties and advanced to the first round.

29 January 2011
15:00 UTC+01:00

| USS Kraké (Benin) | 1 – 1 | (Morocco) Maghreb de Fès |
|---|---|---|
| Paterne Houéssinon 66' | Report | Moussa Tigana 36' |

Stade Charles de Gaulle, Porto-Novo
11 February 2011
19:00 UTC±00:00

| Maghreb de Fès (Morocco) | 4 – 1 | (Benin) USS Kraké |
|---|---|---|
| Tarik Sektioui 11' (pen.), 57'; Kader Fall 86'; Idriss Belamri 89' | Report | Sidier Sossa 16' |

Fes Stadium, Fes

Maghreb de Fès won 5–2 on aggregate and advanced to the first round.

29 January 2011
16:00 UTC±00:00

| Séwé Sports (Ivory Coast) | 0 – 1 | (Ghana) Ashanti Gold |
|---|---|---|
| | Report | Alhaji Sanni (1H) |

Stade Auguste Denise, San Pédro
27 February 2011
15:00 UTC±00:00

| Ashanti Gold (Ghana) | 1 – 0 | (Ivory Coast) Séwé Sports |
|---|---|---|
| Mohamed Aminu 35' | Report |

Len Clay Stadium, Obuasi

Ashanti Gold won 2–0 on aggregate and advanced to the first round.

30 January 2011
15:30 UTC+01:00

| Foullah Edifice (Chad) | 2 – 0 | (Equatorial Guinea) Sony Elá Nguema |
|---|---|---|
| Abdelaziz 39'; Saker 90+' | Report |

Stade Nacional, N'Djamena
11 February 2011
15:30 UTC+01:00

| Sony Elá Nguema (Equatorial Guinea) | 1 – 0 | (Chad) Foullah Edifice |
|---|---|---|
| Ellong 58' | Report |

Estadio de Malabo, Malabo

Foullah Edifice won 2–1 on aggregate and advanced to the first round.

30 January 2011
15:30 UTC+01:00

| ASA (Angola) | 0 – 0 | (Kenya) Sofapaka |

Estádio 11 de Novembro. Luanda
13 February 2011
16:00 UTC+03:00

| Sofapaka (Kenya) | 0 – 0 | (Angola) ASA |
|---|---|---|
| | Report |
Penalties
| | 5 – 4 |

Nyayo National Stadium, Nairobi

0–0 on aggregate; Sofapaka won on penalties and advanced to the first round.

29 January 2011
15:00 UTC+02:00

| Highlanders (Zimbabwe) | 1 – 1 | (Zambia) Nchanga Rangers |
|---|---|---|
| ? (?) | | ? (?) |

Barbourfields Stadium, Bulawayo

| Nchanga Rangers (Zambia) | w/o | (Zimbabwe) Highlanders |

Nchanga Rangers advanced to the first round after Highlanders withdrew following the first leg.

30 January 2011
14:30 UTC+03:00

| AS Adema (Madagascar) | 0 – 0 | (Mozambique) CD Maxaquene |

Mahamasina Municipal Stadium, Antananarivo
13 February 2011
15:00 UTC+02:00

| CD Maxaquene (Mozambique) | 1 – 1 | (Madagascar) AS Adema |
|---|---|---|
| Gabito 84' | Report | Zoeliniaina 8' |

Estádio do Maxaquene, Maputo

1–1 on aggregate; AS Adema won on the away goals rule and advanced to the first round.

29 January 2011
17:00 UTC+04:00

| US Sainte-Marienne (Réunion) | 1 – 0 | (South Africa) Wits |
|---|---|---|
| Blanchard Dogba (?) | Report |

Stade Nelson Mandela, Sainte-Marie
12 February 2011
15:30 UTC+02:00

| Wits (South Africa) | 4 – 0 | (Réunion) US Sainte-Marienne |
|---|---|---|
| Ryan Chapman 34'; Godfrey Serunkuma 71', 75'; Sibusiso Vilakazi 85' | Report |

Bidvest Stadium, Johannesburg

Wits won 4–1 on aggregate and advanced to the first round.

30 January 2011
16:00 UTC±00:00

| Centre Salif Keita (Mali) | 2 – 2 | (Morocco) Difaa El Jadida |
|---|---|---|
| Lansana Diara 70' (pen.), 80' | Report | Mounir Daifi 12'; Mahdi Kernas 17' |

Stade Modibo Kéïta, Bamako
12 February 2011
19:00 UTC±00:00

| Difaa El Jadida (Morocco) | 1 – 1 | (Mali) Centre Salif Keita |
|---|---|---|
| Vivien Mabide 89' | Report | Yacouba Niare 65' |

Stade El Abdi, El Jadida

3–3 on aggregate; Difaa El Jadida won on the away goals rule and advanced to the first round.

29 January 2011
15:30 UTC+01:00

| Fovu Club (Cameroon) | 2 – 1 | (Burkina Faso) USFA |
|---|---|---|
| Aime Balogog 25'; Willy Namedji 33' | | Seidou Bomison 45' (pen.) |

Stade Ahmadou Ahidjo, Yaoundé
13 February 2011
15:30 UTC+01:00

| USFA (Burkina Faso) | 3 – 1 | (Cameroon) Fovu Club |
|---|---|---|
| Abdelfata Toumagnon 17' (pen.); Zaaf Gnoumou 45+1'; Ernest Yélémou 79' | Report | Gerard Atsafack 65' |

Stade de l'USFA, Ouagadougou

USFA won 4–3 on aggregate and advanced to the first round.

29 January 2011
16:00 UTC±00:00

| FC Séquence (Guinea) | 0 – 1 | (Ivory Coast) Africa Sports |
|---|---|---|
| | Report | Magloire Kouame (?) |

Stade du 28 Septembre, Conakry
27 February 2011
15:30 UTC±00:00

| Africa Sports (Ivory Coast) | 1 – 1 | (Guinea) FC Séquence |
|---|---|---|
| Goue Blagnon 75' | Report | Aboubacar Camara 78' |

Stade Robert Champroux, Abidjan

Africa Sports won 2–1 on aggregate and advanced to the first round.

29 January 2011
18:00 UTC+01:00

| Diplomates (Central African Republic) | 0 – 0 | (Cameroon) Tiko United |

Barthelemy Boganda Stadium, Bangui
12 February 2011
15:30 UTC+01:00

| Tiko United (Cameroon) | 3 – 1 | (Central African Republic) Diplomates |
|---|---|---|
| Alain Nkafu 51'; Clovis Ngalame 75'; Edwin Mbon Ayuk 90+5' | Report | Gourrier Junior 32' (pen.) |

Stade de Moliko, Buea

Tiko United won 3–1 on aggregate and advanced to the first round.

29 January 2011
16:30 UTC+03:00

| KMKM (Zanzibar) | 0 – 4 | (Democratic Republic of the Congo) Motema Pembe |
|---|---|---|
| | Report | Ilongo Ngansanya 4'; Salakiaku Matondo 17', 83'; Rino Inassawa 53' |

Amaan Stadium, Zanzibar City
25 February 2011
15:30 UTC+01:00

| Motema Pembe (Democratic Republic of the Congo) | 2 – 0 | (Zanzibar) KMKM |
|---|---|---|
| Nkanu Mbiyavanga 20'; Bokota Labama 85' | Report |

Stade des Martyrs, Kinshasa

Motema Pembe won 6–0 on aggregate and advanced to the first round.

29 January 2011
15:30 UTC+02:00

| Mbabane Highlanders (Eswatini) | 1 – 1 | (Uganda) Victors |
|---|---|---|
| Djini 88' (pen.) | Report | Katende Mike 44' |

Prince of Wales Stadium, Mbabane
11 February 2011
16:30 UTC+03:00

| Victors (Uganda) | 1 – 1 | (Eswatini) Mbabane Highlanders |
|---|---|---|
| Isaac Katwine 25' | Report | Daman Kalasi 80' |
Penalties
| | 4 – 1 |

Kavumba Recreation Centre, Wakiso

2–2 on aggregate; Victors won on penalties and advanced to the first round.

29 January 2011
15:30 UTC+03:00

| Young Africans (Tanzania) | 4 – 4 | (Ethiopia) Dedebit |
|---|---|---|
| ? (1H) ? (1H) ? (2H) ? (2H) | Report | Getaneh Kebede (1H); Berhanu Bogale (1H); Dawit Fekadu (1H); Tadele Mengesha 60' |

Benjamin Mkapa National Stadium, Dar es Salaam
12 February 2011
16:00 UTC+03:00

| Dedebit (Ethiopia) | 2 – 0 | (Tanzania) Young Africans |
|---|---|---|
| Getaneh Kebebe 37'; Temesgan Tekle 81' | Report |

Abebe Bikila Stadium, Addis Ababa

Dedebit won 6–4 on aggregate and advanced to the first round.

== First round ==
This was a knock-out stage of 32 teams; the 20 teams advancing from the preliminary round, and 12 teams that received byes to this round.

First legs: 18–20 March 2011; Second legs: 1–3 April 2011.

20 March 2011
16:00 UTC+01:00

| JS Kabylie (Algeria) | 1 – 0 | (Mauritania) ASC Tevragh-Zeïna |
|---|---|---|
| Chemseddine Nessakh 26' | Report |

Stade 1er Novembre, Tizi Ouzou
2 April 2011
16:00 UTC±00:00

| ASC Tevragh-Zeïna (Mauritania) | 1 – 2 | (Algeria) JS Kabylie |
|---|---|---|
| Ould Mokhtar 65' (pen.) | Report | Chemseddine Nessakh 33', 58' |

Stade Olympique, Nouakchott

JS Kabylie won 3–1 on aggregate and advances to the second round.

18 March 2011
17:00 UTC+03:00

| Al-Nil Al-Hasahesa (Sudan) | 1 – 1 | (Gabon) Missile |
|---|---|---|
| Osama El-Ta'aysha 55' | Report | Herve Osono 56' |

Khartoum Stadium, Khartoum
2 April 2011
15:30 UTC+01:00

| Missile (Gabon) | 2 – 1 | (Sudan) Al-Nil Al-Hasahesa |
|---|---|---|
| Mba Messone Geoffroi 12'; Dany Karl Max 65' | Report | Mohamed Cheick Eldine 27' |

Stade Augustin Monédan de Sibang, Libreville

Missile won 3–2 on aggregate and advanced to the second round.

19 March 2011
18:00 UTC+01:00

| 1º de Agosto (Angola) | 2 – 0 | (Republic of the Congo) AC Léopards |
|---|---|---|
| Roger 37'; Bena 74' | Report |

Estádio dos Coqueiros, Luanda
3 April 2011
15:30 UTC+01:00

| AC Léopards (Republic of the Congo) | 1 – 0 | (Angola) 1º de Agosto |
|---|---|---|
| Lutunu Doulé 77' (pen.) | Report |

Denis Sassou-Nguesso Stadium, Dolisie

1º de Agosto won 2–1 on aggregate and advanced to the second round.

19 March 2011
18:30 UTC±00:00

| FUS Rabat (Morocco) | 2 – 0 | (Senegal) Touré Kunda Footpro |
|---|---|---|
| Hicham El Fatihi 9'; Alaa Masskini 71' | Report |

Prince Moulay Abdellah Stadium, Rabat
2 April 2011
15:00 UTC±00:00

| Touré Kunda Footpro (Senegal) | 2 – 1 | (Morocco) FUS Rabat |
|---|---|---|
| Souleymane Diallo 73'; Cheikh Tidiane Samb 87' | | Abdelilah Mansour 89' |

Stade Demba Diop, Dakar

FUS Rabat won 3–2 on aggregate and advanced to the second round.

| Al-Khartoum (Sudan) | w/o | (Libya) Al-Nasr |

Al-Khartoum advanced to the second round after Al-Nasr withdrew. Tie was scheduled to be played over one leg due to the political situation in Libya, but match did not take place.

19 March 2011
19:00 UTC±00:00

| Maghreb de Fès (Morocco) | 0 – 0 | (Niger) Sahel SC |
|---|---|---|
| | Report |

Fes Stadium, Fes
3 April 2011
16:00 UTC+01:00

| Sahel SC (Niger) | 1 – 2 | (Morocco) Maghreb de Fès |
|---|---|---|
| Aboubaker 60' | Report | Kader Fall 11'; Mohamed Chihani 82' |

Général Seyni Kountché Stadion, Niamey

Maghreb de Fès won 2–1 on aggregate and advanced to the second round.

20 March 2011
14:30 UTC+01:00

| Etoile Sahel (Tunisia) | 3 – 0 | (Ghana) Ashanti Gold |
|---|---|---|
| Lamjed Chehoudi 43'; Danilo Petrolli Bueno 65', 90+4' | Report |

Stade Olympique de Sousse, Sousse
3 April 2011
17:00 UTC±00:00

| Ashanti Gold (Ghana) | 2 – 1 | (Tunisia) Etoile Sahel |
|---|---|---|
| Theophilus Annobah 67', 74' | Report | Lamjed Chehoudi 60' |

Len Clay Stadium, Obuasi

Etoile Sahel won 4–2 on aggregate and advanced to the second round.

20 March 2011
16:00 UTC+01:00

| Kaduna United (Nigeria) | 2 – 0 | (Chad) Foullah Edifice |
|---|---|---|
| Ali Adamu 37'; Linus Adams 55' | Report |

Kaduna Township Stadium, Kaduna
2 April 2011
15:30 UTC+01:00

| Foullah Edifice (Chad) | 1 – 0 | (Nigeria) Kaduna United |
|---|---|---|
| ? (?) |

Stade Nacional, N'Djamena

Kaduna United won 2–1 on aggregate and advanced to the second round.

18 March 2011
16:30 UTC+02:00

| Ismaily (Egypt) | 2 – 0 | (Kenya) Sofapaka |
|---|---|---|
| Mohamed Abougrisha 10'; Hosny Abd Rabo 15' | Report |

Ismailia Stadium, Ismailia
2 April 2011
17:00 UTC+03:00

| Sofapaka (Kenya) | 4 – 0 | (Egypt) Ismaily |
|---|---|---|
| Anthony Kimani 26'; Bob Mugalia 32'; Titus Mulama 37'; Patrick Kagogo 90+5' | Report |

Nyayo National Stadium, Nairobi

Sofapaka won 4–2 on aggregate and advanced to the second round.

18 March 2011
15:30 UTC+02:00

| Saint Eloi Lupopo (Democratic Republic of the Congo) | 1 – 0 | (Zambia) Nchanga Rangers |
|---|---|---|
| Garington Ngomba 21' | Report |

Stade Frederic Kibassa Maliba, Lubumbashi
2 April 2011
15:00 UTC+02:00

| Nchanga Rangers (Zambia) | 0 – 2 | (Democratic Republic of the Congo) Saint Eloi Lupopo |
|---|---|---|
| | Report | Tamundle Ziyunga 56'; Tady Agiti 90' |

Nchanga Stadium, Chingola

Saint Eloi Lupopo won 3–0 on aggregate and advanced to the second round.

21 March 2011
15:30 UTC+02:00

| Wits (South Africa) | 1 – 1 | (Madagascar) AS Adema |
|---|---|---|
| Mark Haskins 52' | Report | Christian Rakotonirina 57' |

Bidvest Stadium, Johannesburg

Note: First leg originally played on 20 March 2011 (kick-off 15:00 UTC+02:00), but abandoned after half-time with score 0–0 due to torrential rain, and replayed the next day.

3 April 2011
16:00 UTC+03:00

| AS Adema (Madagascar) | 2 – 0 | (South Africa) Wits |
|---|---|---|
| Jean Ba 70'; Tita 87' | Report |

Mahamasina Municipal Stadium, Antananarivo

AS Adema won 3–1 on aggregate and advanced to the second round.

18 March 2011
14:30 UTC+01:00

| Olympique Béja (Tunisia) | 2 – 0 | (Morocco) Difaa El Jadida |
|---|---|---|
| Bassem Mannei 90+3'; Ibrahima Camara 90+4' (pen.) | Report |

Stade Olympique, Béja
2 April 2011
16:00 UTC±00:00

| Difaa El Jadida (Morocco) | 3 – 0 | (Tunisia) Olympique Béja |
|---|---|---|
| Adil Karrouchy 30'; Abdessamad Rafik 70', 81' | Report |

Stade El Abdi, El Jadida

Difaa El Jadida won 3–2 on aggregate and advanced to the second round.

| USFA (Burkina Faso) | w/o | (Ivory Coast) Africa Sports |

USFA advanced to the second round after Africa Sports withdrew. Tie was scheduled to be played over one leg (at Accra, Ghana on 3 April 2011) due to the political situation in Côte d'Ivoire. but match did not take place.

20 March 2011
16:00 UTC+01:00

| Sunshine Stars (Nigeria) | 2 – 0 | (Cameroon) Tiko United |
|---|---|---|
| Kayode Abiodun 47'; Ajani Ibrahim 75' | Report |

Ilaro Stadium, Ilaro
3 April 2011
15:30 UTC+01:00

| Tiko United (Cameroon) | 0 – 1 | (Nigeria) Sunshine Stars |
|---|---|---|
| | Report | Dele Olurundare 88' |

Stade de la Réunification, Douala

Sunshine Stars won 3–0 on aggregate and advanced to the second round.

19 March 2011
14:00 UTC+03:00

| Victors (Uganda) | 1 – 1 | (Democratic Republic of the Congo) Motema Pembe |
|---|---|---|
| Yuda Mugalu 19' | Report | Ilongo Ngasanja 80' |

Nakivubo Stadium, Kampala
3 April 2011
15:30 UTC+01:00

| Motema Pembe (Democratic Republic of the Congo) | 1 – 0 | (Uganda) Victors |
|---|---|---|
| Nkanu Mbiyavanga 90' | Report |

Stade des Martyrs, Kinshasa

Motema Pembe won 2–1 on aggregate and advanced to the second round.

20 March 2011
17:30 UTC+02:00

| Haras El Hodood (Egypt) | 4 – 0 | (Ethiopia) Dedebit |
|---|---|---|
| Ahmed Hassan Mekky 7'; Mohamed Halim 58'; Abdelrahman Mohie 78'; Ahmed Abdel-Ghani 88' |

Harras El-Hedoud Stadium, Alexandria
2 April 2011
17:00 UTC+03:00

| Dedebit (Ethiopia) | 1 – 1 | (Egypt) Haras El Hodood |
|---|---|---|
| Dawit Fekadu 2' | | Ahmed Abdel-Ghani 90+5' |

Abebe Bikila Stadium, Addis Ababa

Haras El Hodood won 5–1 on aggregate and advanced to the second round.

== Second round ==
This was a knock-out stage of the 16 teams that advanced from the first round; winners advanced to the play-off round, where they were joined by the eight losers from the CAF Champions League second round.

First legs: 22–24 April 2011; Second legs 6–8 May 2011.

23 April 2011
15:30 UTC+01:00

| Missile (Gabon) | 3 – 0 | (Algeria) JS Kabylie |
|---|---|---|
| Geoffroy Ngame Essono 47'; Claude Mvé Mintsa 60'; Max Dany-Karl 81' | Report |

Stade Augustin Monédan de Sibang, Libreville
6 May 2011
18:00 UTC+01:00

| JS Kabylie (Algeria) | 3 – 0 | (Gabon) Missile |
|---|---|---|
| Saad Tedjar 16' (pen.), 35'; Sid Ali Yahia-Chérif 65' | Report |
Penalties
| Ali Rial (penalty scored); Saad Tedjar (penalty scored); Mohamed Khoutir-Ziti (penalty scored) | 3 – 0 | (penalty missed) Claude Mvé Mintsa; (penalty missed) ? (penalty missed) Momo Epandé |

Stade 1er Novembre, Tizi Ouzou

3–3 on aggregate; JS Kabylie won on penalties and advanced to the play-off round.

24 April 2011
20:00 UTC+01:00

| FUS Rabat (Morocco) | 1 – 1 | (Angola) 1º de Agosto |
|---|---|---|
| Rachid Rokki 82' | Report | Fofana 90' |

Prince Moulay Abdellah Stadium, Rabat
7 May 2011
15:30 UTC+01:00

| 1º de Agosto (Angola) | 1 – 0 | (Morocco) FUS Rabat |
|---|---|---|
| Amaro 33' (pen.) | Report |

Estádio dos Coqueiros, Luanda

1º de Agosto won 2–1 on aggregate and advanced to the play-off round.

24 April 2011
18:00 UTC+01:00

| Maghreb de Fès (Morocco) | 5 – 1 | (Sudan) Al-Khartoum |
|---|---|---|
| Mohammed Chihani 13'; Tarik Sektioui 38', 50' (pen.), 57'; Hamza Abourazzouk 81' | Report | Mohamed Hassan Taib 73' |

Fes Stadium, Fes
7 May 2011
15:00 UTC+03:00

| Al-Khartoum (Sudan) | 2 – 0 | (Morocco) Maghreb de Fès |
|---|---|---|
| Salah El-Ameer 9' (pen.); Abd al-Hamied Ammari 16' | Report |

Khartoum Stadium, Khartoum

Maghreb de Fès won 5–3 on aggregate and advanced to the play-off round.

| Kaduna United (Nigeria) | w/o | (Tunisia) Etoile Sahel |

Kaduna United advanced to the play-off round after being awarded the tie by CAF, as Etoile Sahel refused to travel to Nigeria for the first leg due to security concerns arising from rioting in the country following the 2011 Nigerian presidential election. First leg was scheduled to be played on 23 April 2011 in Abeokuta (moved from Kaduna by Kaduna United due to the rioting), but Etoile Sahel did not travel and asked the CAF for a postponement.

24 April 2011
15:30 UTC+02:00

| Saint Eloi Lupopo (Democratic Republic of the Congo) | 2 – 1 | (Kenya) Sofapaka |
|---|---|---|
| Tamundele Ziyunga 21'; Oswald Kalamba 41' | Report | Humphrey Mieno 89' |

Stade Frederic Kibassa Maliba, Lubumbashi
8 May 2011
16:00 UTC+03:00

| Sofapaka (Kenya) | 1 – 0 | (Democratic Republic of the Congo) Saint Eloi Lupopo |
|---|---|---|
| John Baraza 89' | Report |

Nyayo National Stadium, Nairobi

2–2 on aggregate; Sofapaka won on the away goals rule and advanced to the play-off round.

24 April 2011
16:00 UTC+01:00

| Difaa El Jadida (Morocco) | 3 – 0 | (Madagascar) AS Adema |
|---|---|---|
| Zakaria Hadraf 15', 78'; Abderrahim Chakir 90+3' (pen.) | Report |

Stade El Abdi, El Jadida
8 May 2011
14:30 UTC+03:00

| AS Adema (Madagascar) | 1 – 0 | (Morocco) Difaa El Jadida |
|---|---|---|
| Tyala Kénédi 3' | Report |

Mahamasina Municipal Stadium, Antananarivo

Difaa El Jadida won 3–1 on aggregate and advanced to the play-off round.

24 April 2011
16:00 UTC+01:00

| Sunshine Stars (Nigeria) | 2 – 0 | (Burkina Faso) USFA |
|---|---|---|
| Sunday Emmanuel 67', 90' | Report |

Gateway Stadium, Ijebu Ode
8 May 2011
15:30 UTC±00:00

| USFA (Burkina Faso) | 1 – 0 | (Nigeria) Sunshine Stars |
|---|---|---|
| Abdelfatai Suleiman 72' | Report |

Stade du 4-Août, Ouagadougou

Sunshine Stars won 2–1 on aggregate and advanced to the play-off round.

24 April 2011
20:00 UTC+02:00

| Haras El Hodood (Egypt) | 2 – 1 | (Democratic Republic of the Congo) Motema Pembe |
|---|---|---|
| Ahmed Hassan Mekky 17'; Ahmed Said 54' (pen.) | Report | Salakiaku Matondo 21' |

Military Stadium, Cairo
8 May 2011
14:30 UTC+01:00

| Motema Pembe (Democratic Republic of the Congo) | 2 – 1 | (Egypt) Haras El Hodood |
|---|---|---|
| Salakiaku Matondo 20', 32' | Report | Ahmed Safy 46' |
Penalties
| | 4 – 3 |

Stade Lumumba, Matadi

3–3 on aggregate; Motema Pembe won on penalties and advanced to the play-off round.

== Play-off round ==
This was a knock-out stage of 16 teams: the eight teams that advanced from the second round, and the eight teams that were eliminated in the CAF Champions League second round. In each tie, a winner from the Confederation Cup second round would play against a loser from the Champions League second round, with the Confederation Cup winner hosting the second leg at home. Moreover, the top-seeded Confederation Cup winner and the top-seeded Champions League loser would not be drawn against each other. Winners advanced to the group stage.

Winners from Confederation Cup second round

- (Algeria) JS Kabylie (top seed)
- (Angola) 1º de Agosto
- (Democratic Republic of the Congo) Motema Pembe
- (Kenya) Sofapaka
- (Morocco) Difaa El Jadida
- (Morocco) Maghreb de Fès
- (Nigeria) Kaduna United
- (Nigeria) Sunshine Stars

Losers from Champions League second round

- (Algeria) ES Sétif (top seed)
- (Angola) Interclube
- (Ivory Coast) ASEC Mimosas
- (Libya) Al-Ittihad
- (Senegal) Diaraf
- (Tanzania) Simba (loser of play-off due to disqualification of TP Mazembe)
- (Tunisia) Club Africain
- (Zambia) ZESCO United

First legs: 27–29 May 2011; Second legs: 10–12 June 2011.

28 May 2011
17:00 UTC+01:00

| ES Sétif (Algeria) | 1 – 0 | (Nigeria) Kaduna United |
|---|---|---|
| Abderahmane Hachoud 78' | Report |

Stade 8 Mai 1945, Sétif
12 June 2011
16:00 UTC+01:00

| Kaduna United (Nigeria) | 3 – 0 | (Algeria) ES Sétif |
|---|---|---|
| Jude Aneke 72', 85'; Rabiu Baita 80' | Report |

Kaduna Township Stadium, Kaduna

Kaduna United won 3–1 on aggregate and advanced to the group stage.

28 May 2011
17:00 UTC±00:00

| Diaraf (Senegal) | 1 – 1 | (Algeria) JS Kabylie |
|---|---|---|
| Babacar Ndiour 57' | Report | Nabil Yaâlaoui 52' |

Stade Demba Diop, Dakar
10 June 2011
18:00 UTC+01:00

| JS Kabylie (Algeria) | 2 – 0 | (Senegal) Diaraf |
|---|---|---|
| Chemseddine Nessakh 81'; Saad Tedjar 90+4' | Report |

Stade 1er Novembre, Tizi Ouzou

JS Kabylie won 3–1 on aggregate and advanced to the group stage.

29 May 2011
19:00 UTC+01:00

| Club Africain (Tunisia) | 3 – 0 | (Kenya) Sofapaka |
|---|---|---|
| Khaled Melliti 4', 48'; Hamza Messadi 79' (pen.) | Report |

Stade El Menzah, Tunis
12 June 2011
15:00 UTC+03:00

| Sofapaka (Kenya) | 3 – 1 | (Tunisia) Club Africain |
|---|---|---|
| Dodo Kayombo 41'; John Baraza 74'; John Onami 84' | Report | Ezechiel Ndouassel 22' |

Nyayo National Stadium, Nairobi

Club Africain won 4–3 on aggregate and advanced to the group stage.

12 June 2011
16:00 UTC+01:00

| Sunshine Stars (Nigeria) | 1 – 0 | (Libya) Al-Ittihad |
|---|---|---|
| Godfrey Oboabona 49' (pen.) | Report |

Gateway Stadium, Ijebu Ode

Sunshine Stars advanced to the group stage. Tie played over one leg due to the political situation in Libya.

29 May 2011
16:00 UTC+02:00

| ZESCO United (Zambia) | 1 – 0 | (Morocco) Maghreb de Fès |
|---|---|---|
| Derrick Kabwe 62' | Report |

Dag Hammarskjöld Stadium, Ndola
11 June 2011
16:00 UTC+01:00

| Maghreb de Fès (Morocco) | 2 – 0 | (Zambia) ZESCO United |
|---|---|---|
| Hamza Abourazzouk 24', 37' | Report |

Fes Stadium, Fes

Maghreb de Fès won 2–1 on aggregate and advanced to the group stage.

12 June 2011
15:30 UTC+03:00

| Simba (Tanzania) | 1 – 0 | (Democratic Republic of the Congo) Motema Pembe |
|---|---|---|
| Mussa Mgosi 83' | Report |

Benjamin Mkapa National Stadium, Dar-es-Salaam
19 June 2011
15:30 UTC+01:00

| Motema Pembe (Democratic Republic of the Congo) | 2 – 0 | (Tanzania) Simba |
|---|---|---|
| Juma Kaseje 38'; Salakiaku Matondo 68' | Report |

Stade des Martyrs, Kinshasa

Motema Pembe won 2–1 on aggregate and advanced to the group stage.

29 May 2011
16:30 UTC±00:00

| ASEC Mimosas (Ivory Coast) | 4 – 0 | (Angola) 1º de Agosto |
|---|---|---|
| Késsé Mangoua 27'; N'Doua Kouakou 46' (pen.); Adama Bakayoko 60'; Olarenwaju Kayode 69' | Report |

Stade Robert Champroux, Abidjan
11 June 2011
16:00 UTC+01:00

| 1º de Agosto (Angola) | 1 – 1 | (Ivory Coast) ASEC Mimosas |
|---|---|---|
| Amaro 79' | Report | Adama Bakayoko 15' |

Estádio dos Coqueiros, Luanda

ASEC Mimosas won 5–1 on aggregate and advanced to the group stage.

29 May 2011
14:00 UTC+01:00

| Interclube (Angola) | 3 – 0 | (Morocco) Difaa El Jadida |
|---|---|---|
| Minguito 45'; Dias Caires 87'; Moco 90' | Report |

Estádio Joaquim Dinis, Luanda
11 June 2011
17:00 UTC+01:00

| Difaa El Jadida (Morocco) | 2 – 2 | (Angola) Interclube |
|---|---|---|
| Abdessamad Rafik 67'; Mohamed Nahiri 89' | Report | Paty 50', 62' |

Stade El Abdi, El Jadida

Interclube won 5–2 on aggregate and advanced to the group stage.
