= 2011 CAF Confederation Cup final =

- Event: 2011 CAF Confederation Cup
Club Africain	Maghreb de Fès
(Tunisia)	(Morocco)
1	1
- Maghreb de Fès won on penalties 6–5

First leg
Club Africain	Maghreb de Fès
1	0
- Date: 19 November 2011
- Venue: Stade 14 January, Tunis

Second Leg
Maghreb de Fès	Club Africain
1	0
- Date: 4 December 2011
- Venue: Fes Stadium, Fes

The 2011 CAF Confederation Cup final was the final of 2011 CAF Confederation Cup, which was the 8th edition of the CAF Confederation Cup, Africa's secondary club football competition organized by the Confederation of African Football (CAF).

The final was played between Club Africain from Tunisia and Maghreb de Fès from Morocco. The winners qualified to participate in the 2012 CAF Super Cup against the winner of the 2011 CAF Champions League.

== Road to final ==
(Tunisia) Club Africain				Round	(Morocco) Maghreb de Fès			
Champions League					Confederation Cup			
Opponent	Agg.	1st leg	2nd leg	Qualifying rounds	Opponent	Agg.	1st leg	2nd leg
(Rwanda) APR	6–2	2–2 (A)	4–0 (H)	Preliminary round	(Benin) USS Kraké	5–2	1–1 (A)	4–1 (H)
(Egypt) Zamalek	5–4	4–2 (H)	1–2 (abd.) (A)	First round	(Niger) Sahel SC	2–1	0–0 (H)	2–1 (A)
(Sudan) Al-Hilal	1–2	0–1 (A)	1–1 (abd.) (H)	Second round	(Sudan) Al-Khartoum	5–3	5–1 (H)	0–2 (A)
Confederation Cup
(Kenya) Sofapaka	4–3	3–0 (H)	1–3 (A)	Play-off round	(Zambia) ZESCO United	2–1	0–1 (A)	2–0 (H)
Opponent	Result			Group stage	Opponent	Result		
(Ivory Coast) ASEC Mimosas	1–1 (A)			Matchday 1	(Algeria) JS Kabylie	1–0 (H)		
(Nigeria) Kaduna United	0–0 (H)			Matchday 2	(Democratic Republic of the Congo) Motema Pembe	1–1 (A)		
(Angola) Inter Luanda	2–0 (H)			Matchday 3	(Nigeria) Sunshine Stars	1–0 (H)		
(Angola) Inter Luanda	1–2 (A)			Matchday 4	(Nigeria) Sunshine Stars	1–1 (A)		
(Ivory Coast) ASEC Mimosas	1–0 (H)			Matchday 5	(Algeria) JS Kabylie	1–0 (A)		
(Nigeria) Kaduna United	1–0 (A)			Matchday 6	(Democratic Republic of the Congo) Motema Pembe	3–0 (H)		
Group A winner: Team / Pld / W / D / L / GF / GA / GD / Pts; (Tunisia) Club Africain / 6 / 3 / 2 / 1 / 6 / 3 / +3 / 11; (Angola) Inter Luanda / 6 / 3 / 1 / 2 / 8 / 6 / +2 / 10; (Ivory Coast) ASEC Mimosas / 6 / 2 / 1 / 3 / 5 / 6 / −1 / 7; (Nigeria) Kaduna United / 6 / 1 / 2 / 3 / 5 / 9 / −4 / 5				Final standings	Group B winner: Team / Pld / W / D / L / GF / GA / GD / Pts; (Morocco) Maghreb de Fès / 6 / 4 / 2 / 0 / 8 / 2 / +6 / 14; (Nigeria) Sunshine Stars / 6 / 3 / 2 / 1 / 6 / 3 / +3 / 11; (Democratic Republic of the Congo) Motema Pembe / 6 / 2 / 2 / 2 / 5 / 6 / −1 / 8; (Algeria) JS Kabylie / 6 / 0 / 0 / 6 / 1 / 9 / −8 / 0			
Opponent	Agg.	1st leg	2nd leg	Knock-out stage	Opponent	Agg.	1st leg	2nd leg
(Nigeria) Sunshine Stars	1–0	1–0 (A)	0–0 (H)	Semifinals	(Angola) Inter Luanda	2–2 (a)	1–2 (A)	1–0 (H)

== Rules ==
The final was decided over two legs, with aggregate goals used to determine the winner. If the sides were level on aggregate after the second leg, the away goals rule would have been applied, and if still level, the tie would have proceeded directly to a penalty shootout (no extra time is played).

== Match details ==
=== First leg ===
19 November 2011
18:00 UTC+01:00

Club Africain (Tunisia)	1–0	(Morocco) Maghreb de Fès
Enam 8'	Report

Stade 14 January, Tunis
Referee: Djamel Haimoudi (Algeria)

=== Second leg ===
4 December 2011
18:30 UTC±00:00

Maghreb de Fès (Morocco)	1–0	(Tunisia) Club Africain
Tigana 45+3'	Report
Penalties
Chtibi (penalty scored); Haji (penalty missed); El Yousfi (penalty scored); Dahmani (penalty scored); Abourazzouk (penalty scored); El Basri (penalty scored); Zniti (penalty scored)	6–5	(penalty missed) Reguiî; (penalty scored) Ifa; (penalty scored) Yaakoubi; (penalty scored) Akremi; (penalty scored) Dhaouadi; (penalty scored) Mendomo; (penalty missed) Ziadi

Fes Stadium, Fes
Referee: Badara Diatta (Senegal)
