= 2011 CAF Confederation Cup group stage =

Group stage featured the eight winners from the play-off round

- Dates: 15 July – 18 September 2011

Tournament statistics
- Matches played: 24
- Goals scored: 44 (1.83 per match)

The 2011 CAF Confederation Cup group stage matches took place between July and September 2011. The matchdays were: 15–17 July, 29–31 July, 12–14 August, 26–28 August, 9–11 September, and 16–18 September.

The group stage featured the eight winners from the play-off round. They were divided into two groups of four, where they played each other home-and-away in a round-robin format. The top two teams in each group advanced to the semifinals.

== Seeding ==
The draw for the group stage (which followed the draw for the play-off round) took place on 15 May 2011, at the CAF Headquarters in Cairo.

The procedures for the group stage draw were announced on 12 May 2011. The winners of the eight play-off round ties were divided into two pots. The winners of the ties involving the two top-seeded teams in the play-off round draw were in Pot 1, while the other six winners were in Pot 2. Each group contained one team from Pot 1 and three teams from Pot 2.

	Play-off round ties		
	Team 1 (CL 2nd round losers)	v	Team 2 (CC 2nd round winners)
Pot 1	(top seed) ES Sétif (Algeria)	v	(Nigeria) **Kaduna United**
Pot 1	Diaraf (Senegal)	v	(Algeria) **JS Kabylie** (top seed)
Pot 2	**Club Africain** (Tunisia)	v	(Kenya) Sofapaka
Pot 2	Al-Ittihad (Libya)	v	(Nigeria) **Sunshine Stars**
Pot 2	ZESCO United (Zambia)	v	(Morocco) **Maghreb de Fès**
Pot 2	^{†}Simba (Tanzania)	v	(Democratic Republic of the Congo) **Motema Pembe**
Pot 2	**ASEC Mimosas** (Ivory Coast)	v	(Angola) 1º de Agosto
Pot 2	**Interclube** (Angola)	v	(Morocco) Difaa El Jadida

Notes:

- Winners of each tie shown in **bold**
- ^{†} Loser of play-off due to disqualification of TP Mazembe

== Tiebreakers ==
The order of tie-breakers used when two or more teams have equal number of points is:

1. Number of points obtained in games between the teams concerned;
2. Goal difference in games between the teams concerned;
3. Goals scored in games between the teams concerned;
4. Away goals scored in games between the teams concerned;
5. Goal difference in all games;
6. Goals scored in all games;
7. Drawing of lots.

== Groups ==
=== Group A ===
Team	Pld	W	D	L	GF	GA	GD	Pts	CA	INC	ASEC	KAD
(Tunisia) Club Africain	6	3	2	1	6	3	+3	11	—	2–0	1–0	0–0
(Angola) Interclube	6	3	1	2	8	6	+2	10	2–1	—	1–0	4–1
(Ivory Coast) ASEC Mimosas	6	2	1	3	5	6	−1	7	1–1	1–0	—	2–1
(Nigeria) Kaduna United	6	1	2	3	5	9	−4	5	0–1	1–1	2–1	—

16 July 2011
14:00 UTC+01:00

Kaduna United (Nigeria)	1 – 1	(Angola) Interclube
Ali Adamu 60'	Report	Patrick Lembo 89'

Kaduna Township Stadium, Kaduna
Referee: Eric Otogo (Gabon)
17 July 2011
15:30 UTC±00:00

ASEC Mimosas (Ivory Coast)	1 – 1	(Tunisia) Club Africain
Hugues Zagbayou 62'	Report	Hamza Messaïdi 72'

Stade Félix Houphouët-Boigny, Abidjan
Referee: Bouchaib El Ahrach (Morocco)

31 July 2011
16:30 UTC+01:00

Interclube (Angola)	1 – 0	(Ivory Coast) ASEC Mimosas
Capuco 28'	Report

Estádio Joaquim Dinis, Luanda
31 July 2011
22:00 UTC+01:00

Club Africain (Tunisia)	0 – 0	(Nigeria) Kaduna United
	Report

Stade El Menzah, Tunis

13 August 2011
22:00 UTC+01:00

Club Africain (Tunisia)	2 – 0	(Angola) Interclube
Mohamed Yacoubi 32'; Braulio Diniz 55' (o.g.)	Report

Stade El Menzah, Tunis
14 August 2011
15:30 UTC±00:00

ASEC Mimosas (Ivory Coast)	2 – 1	(Nigeria) Kaduna United
Kouakou Irenee 46'; Brefo Mensah 69'	Report	Mohamed Abdul 66'

Stade Félix Houphouët-Boigny, Abidjan

28 August 2011
16:30 UTC+01:00

Kaduna United (Nigeria)	2 – 1	(Ivory Coast) ASEC Mimosas
Jude Aneke 30'; Siman Yusuf 60'	Report	Olanrewaju Kayode 70' (pen.)

Kaduna Township Stadium, Kaduna
28 August 2011
19:00 UTC+01:00

Interclube (Angola)	2 – 1	(Tunisia) Club Africain
Manucho Barros 77', 88'	Report	Hamza Messaïdi 68'

Estádio Joaquim Dinis, Luanda

11 September 2011
15:30 UTC+01:00

Interclube (Angola)	4 – 1	(Nigeria) Kaduna United
Capuco 9', 73'; Pingo 45'; Manucho Barros 55'	Report	Jude Aneke 83'

Estádio Joaquim Dinis, Luanda
11 September 2011
18:00 UTC+01:00

Club Africain (Tunisia)	1 – 0	(Ivory Coast) ASEC Mimosas
Aymen Soltani 60'	Report

Stade El Menzah, Tunis

18 September 2011
15:00 UTC+01:00

Kaduna United (Nigeria)	0 – 1	(Tunisia) Club Africain
	Report	Chaker Rguii 45' (pen.)

Kaduna Township Stadium, Kaduna
18 September 2011
14:00 UTC±00:00

ASEC Mimosas (Ivory Coast)	1 – 0	(Angola) Interclube
Hugues Zagbayou 28'	Report

Stade Félix Houphouët-Boigny, Abidjan

=== Group B ===
Team	Pld	W	D	L	GF	GA	GD	Pts	MAS	SUN	DCMP	JSK
(Morocco) Maghreb de Fès	6	4	2	0	8	2	+6	14	—	1–0	3–0	1–0
(Nigeria) Sunshine Stars	6	3	2	1	6	3	+3	11	1–1	—	2–0	1–0
(Democratic Republic of the Congo) Motema Pembe	6	2	2	2	5	6	−1	8	1–1	0–0	—	2–0
(Algeria) JS Kabylie	6	0	0	6	1	9	−8	0	0–1	1–2	0–2	—

16 July 2011
16:00 UTC+01:00

Sunshine Stars (Nigeria)	2 – 0	(Democratic Republic of the Congo) Motema Pembe
Dayo Ojo 55'; Ajani Ibrahim 90'	Report

Gateway Stadium, Ijebu Ode
Referee: Nampiandrarza Hamada (Madagascar)
16 July 2011
20:00 UTC+01:00

Maghreb de Fès (Morocco)	1 – 0	(Algeria) JS Kabylie
Chemseddine Chtibi 85'	Report

Fes Stadium, Fes
Referee: Mohamed Said Kordi (Tunisia)

29 July 2011
21:00 UTC+01:00

JS Kabylie (Algeria)	1 – 2	(Nigeria) Sunshine Stars
Salim Hanifi 18'	Report	Emmanuel Sunday 36'; Sakibu Atanda 74'

Stade 5 Juillet 1962, Algiers
31 July 2011
14:00 UTC+01:00

Motema Pembe (Democratic Republic of the Congo)	1 – 1	(Morocco) Maghreb de Fès
Tusilu Bazola 30'	Report	Mehdi El Bassel 70'

Stade des Martyrs, Kinshasa

12 August 2011
22:00 UTC+01:00

JS Kabylie (Algeria)	0 – 2	(Democratic Republic of the Congo) Motema Pembe
	Report	Ilongo Ngasanya 34' (pen.), 68'

Stade 5 Juillet 1962, Algiers
13 August 2011
22:00 UTC±00:00

Maghreb de Fès (Morocco)	1 – 0	(Nigeria) Sunshine Stars
Abdelhadi Halhoul 29'	Report

Fes Stadium, Fes

27 August 2011
14:00 UTC+01:00

Motema Pembe (Democratic Republic of the Congo)	2 – 0	(Algeria) JS Kabylie
Inasawa Nfumu 80' (pen.); Ngandu Junior 88'	Report

Stade des Martyrs, Kinshasa
27 August 2011
16:30 UTC+01:00

Sunshine Stars (Nigeria)	1 – 1	(Morocco) Maghreb de Fès
Ajani Ibrahim 90'	Report	Chemseddine Chtibi 51'

Gateway Stadium, Ijebu Ode

10 September 2011
21:00 UTC+01:00

JS Kabylie (Algeria)	0 – 1	(Morocco) Maghreb de Fès
	Report	Hamza Abourazzouk 55'

Stade 5 Juillet 1962, Algiers
11 September 2011
14:00 UTC+01:00

Motema Pembe (Democratic Republic of the Congo)	0 – 0	(Nigeria) Sunshine Stars
	Report

Stade des Martyrs, Kinshasa

17 September 2011
16:00 UTC+01:00

Sunshine Stars (Nigeria)	1 – 0	(Algeria) JS Kabylie
Ajani Ibrahim 11'	Report

Gateway Stadium, Ijebu Ode
17 September 2011
15:00 UTC±00:00

Maghreb de Fès (Morocco)	3 – 0	(Democratic Republic of the Congo) Motema Pembe
Hamza Abourazzouk 10'; Chemseddine Chtibi 69' (pen.); Mohammed Ali Bemammer 74'	Report

Fes Stadium, Fes
