= 2011 CAF Confederation Cup =

International football competition in Africa

Tournament details
- Dates: 28 January – 4 December 2011
- Teams: 52+8 (from 40 associations)

Final positions
- Champions: (Morocco) Maghreb de Fès (1st title)
- Runners-up: (Tunisia) Club Africain

Tournament statistics
- Matches played: 126
- Goals scored: 265 (2.1 per match)

The 2011 CAF Confederation Cup (also known as the 2011 Orange CAF Confederation Cup for sponsorship reasons) was the 8th edition of the CAF Confederation Cup, Africa's secondary club football competition organized by the Confederation of African Football (CAF). The winners qualified to play in the 2012 CAF Super Cup.

== Association team allocation ==
Theoretically, up to 55 CAF member associations may enter the 2011 CAF Confederation Cup, with the 12 highest ranked associations according to CAF 5-year ranking eligible to enter 2 teams in the competition. For this year's competition, CAF used 2005–09 5-Year ranking. As a result, a maximum of 67 teams could enter the tournament – although this level has never been reached.

=== Ranking system ===
CAF calculates points for each entrant association based on their clubs' performance over the last five years in the CAF Champions League and CAF Confederation Cup, not taking into considering the running year. The criteria for points are the following:

	CAF Champions League	CAF Confederation Cup
Winner	5 points	4 points
Runner-up	4 points	3 points
Semi-finalists	3 points	2 points
3rd of the groups	2 points	1 point
4th of the groups	1 point	1 point

The points shall be multiplied by a coefficient according to the year as follow:

- 2009 – 5
- 2008 – 4
- 2007 – 3
- 2006 – 2
- 2005 – 1

This system is different from the one used for the 2010 CAF Champions League and previous years.

=== Entrants list ===
Below is the entrants list for the competition. Nations are shown according to their 2005–2009 CAF 5-year ranking – those with a ranking score have their rank and score indicated. Teams were also seeded using their individual team 2006–2010 5-year ranking. The top 12 sides (shown in bold) received byes to the first qualifying round.

Association	Club	Qualifying method
Associations with two entrants (Ranked 1–12)
Tunisia (1st – 96 pts)	**Etoile Sahel**	2009–10 Tunisian Ligue Professionnelle 1 third place
Tunisia (1st – 96 pts)	**Olympique Béja**	2009–10 Tunisian President Cup winner
Egypt (2nd – 87 pts)	**Ismaily**	2009–10 Egyptian Premier League third place
Egypt (2nd – 87 pts)	**Haras El Hodood**	2009–10 Egypt Cup winner
Nigeria (3rd – 75 pts)	**Sunshine Stars**	2009–10 Nigeria Premier League third place
Nigeria (3rd – 75 pts)	**Kaduna United**	2010 Nigerian FA Cup winner
Sudan (4th – 54 pts)	**Al-Khartoum**	2010 Sudan Premier League third place
Sudan (4th – 54 pts)	**Al-Nil Al-Hasahesa**	2010 Sudan Premier League fourth place
(Democratic Republic of the Congo) Congo DR (5th – 46 pts)	**Saint Eloi Lupopo**	2010 Linafoot third place
(Democratic Republic of the Congo) Congo DR (5th – 46 pts)	Motema Pembe	2010 Coupe du Congo winner
Algeria (6th – 27 pts)	**JS Kabylie**	2009–10 Algerian Championnat National third place
Algeria (6th – 27 pts)	CA Batna	2009–10 Algerian Cup runner-up
Morocco (=7th – 20 pts)	Difaa El Jadida	2009–10 Botola third place
Morocco (=7th – 20 pts)	**FUS Rabat**	2010 Coupe du Trône winner
Morocco (=7th – 20 pts)	Maghreb de Fès	2010 Coupe du Trône runner-up
Mali (=7th – 20 pts)	Centre Salif Keita	2009–10 Malian Première Division third place
Mali (=7th – 20 pts)	AS Real Bamako	2010 Malian Cup winner
Cameroon (9th – 19 pts)	Tiko United FC	2009–10 Cameroonian Premier League third place
Cameroon (9th – 19 pts)	Fovu Club	2010 Cameroonian Cup winner
Ivory Coast (=10th – 18 pts)	Séwé Sports	2010 Côte d'Ivoire Premier Division third place
Ivory Coast (=10th – 18 pts)	Africa Sports National	2010 Coupe de Côte d'Ivoire de football winner
Angola (=10th – 18 pts)	**1º de Agosto**	2010 Girabola (XXXII) third place
Angola (=10th – 18 pts)	ASA	2010 Angola Cup winner
Zimbabwe (12th – 17 pts)	Highlanders (one entrant only)	2010 Zimbabwe Premier Soccer League third place
Associations with one entrant (Fewer ranking points than the 12th CAF association)
Ghana (13th – 12 pts)	Ashanti Gold	2009–10 Ghana Premier League runner-up
Zambia (14th – 10 pts)	Nchanga Rangers	2010 Zambian Premier League runner-up
Libya (15th – 9 pts)	Al-Nasr	2009–10 Libyan Cup winner
South Africa (16th – 7 pts)	Wits	2009–10 Nedbank Cup winner
Equatorial Guinea (17th – 2 pts)	CD Elá Nguema	2010 Equatoguinean Premier League runner-up
Gabon (=18th – 1 pt)	Missile	2010 Coupe du Gabon Interclubs runner-up
Guinea (=18th – 1 pt)	FC Séquence	2010 Guinée Coupe Nationale winner
Benin	USS Kraké	2009–10 Benin Premier League third place
Burkina Faso	USFA	2010 Coupe du Faso winner
Burundi	AS Inter Star	2009–10 Burundi Premier League runner-up
Central African Republic	Diplomates	2010 Central African Republic Coupe Nationale winner
Chad	Foullah Edifice	2010 Coupe de Ligue de N'Djaména winner
(Republic of the Congo) Congo	AC Léopards	2010 Coupe du Congo winner
Ethiopia	Dedebit	2009–10 Ethiopian Cup winner
Kenya	Sofapaka	2010 FKL Cup winner
Madagascar	AS Adema	2010 Coupe de Madagascar winner
Mauritania	ASC Tevragh-Zeïna	2010 Mauritania Cup winner
Mozambique	CD Maxaquene	2010 Taça de Moçambique winner
Niger	Sahel SC	2010 Niger Premier League runner-up
Réunion	US Sainte-Marienne	2010 Coupe de la Réunion winner
Rwanda	Etincelles	2009–10 Rwandan Premier League runner-up
Senegal	Touré Kunda Footpro	2010 Senegal FA Cup winner
Sierra Leone	Ports Authority F.C.	2009–10 Sierra Leone National Premier League third place
(Eswatini) Swaziland	Mbabane Highlanders	2010 Swazi Cup winner
Tanzania	Young Africans	2009–10 Tanzanian Premier League runner-up
Togo	Dynamic Togolais	2009 Togolese Championnat National fourth place (no league in 2010)
Uganda	Victors	2010 Ugandan Cup winner
Zanzibar	KMKM	2010 Zanzibar Premier League runner-up

Notes

- Associations that did not enter a team: Botswana, Cape Verde, Comoros, Djibouti, Eritrea, Gambia, Guinea-Bissau, Lesotho, Liberia, Malawi, Mauritius, Namibia, São Tomé and Príncipe, Seychelles, Somalia
- Unranked associations have no ranking points and hence are equal 20th.

Moreover, the eight losers from the 2011 CAF Champions League second round entered the play-off round:

- (Algeria) ES Sétif
- (Angola) Interclube
- (Ivory Coast) ASEC Mimosas
- (Libya) Al-Ittihad
- (Senegal) Diaraf
- (Tanzania) Simba (loser of play-off due to disqualification of TP Mazembe)
- (Tunisia) Club Africain
- (Zambia) ZESCO United

== Dates ==
Schedule of dates for 2011 competition.

Phase	Round	Draw date	First leg	Second leg
Qualifying	Preliminary round	20 December 2010 (Cairo, Egypt)	28–30 January	11–13 February; 25–27 February^{†}
Qualifying	First round	20 December 2010 (Cairo, Egypt)	18–20 March	1–3 April
Qualifying	Second round (1st Round of 16)	20 December 2010 (Cairo, Egypt)	22–24 April	6–8 May
Qualifying	Play-off round (2nd Round of 16)	15 May 2011 (Cairo, Egypt)	27–29 May	10–12 June
Group stage	Matchday 1	15 May 2011 (Cairo, Egypt)	15–17 July	
Group stage	Matchday 2	15 May 2011 (Cairo, Egypt)	29–31 July	
Group stage	Matchday 3	15 May 2011 (Cairo, Egypt)	12–14 August	
Group stage	Matchday 4	15 May 2011 (Cairo, Egypt)	26–28 August	
Group stage	Matchday 5	15 May 2011 (Cairo, Egypt)	9–11 September	
Group stage	Matchday 6	15 May 2011 (Cairo, Egypt)	16–18 September	
Knock-out stage	Semifinals	15 May 2011 (Cairo, Egypt)	14–16 October	28–30 October
Knock-out stage	Final	15 May 2011 (Cairo, Egypt)	18–20 November	2–4 December

^{†} The second leg of the preliminary round matches are postponed to 25–27 February in case the club have at least three players in the 2011 African Nations Championship.

== Qualifying rounds ==
The fixtures for the preliminary, first and second qualifying rounds were announced on 20 December 2010.

Qualification ties were decided over two legs, with aggregate goals used to determine the winner. If the sides were level on aggregate after the second leg, the away goals rule applied, and if still level, the tie proceeded directly to a penalty shootout (no extra time is played).

=== Preliminary round ===
Team 1	Agg.	Team 2	1st leg	2nd leg
ASC Tevragh-Zeïna (Mauritania)	1–0	(Mali) AS Real Bamako	0–0	1–0
Missile (Gabon)	4–1	(Burundi) AS Inter Star	4–0	0–1
AC Léopards (Republic of the Congo)	3–1	(Rwanda) Etincelles	1–1	2–0
Touré Kunda Footpro (Senegal)	4–3	(Sierra Leone) Ports Authority F.C.	2–1	2–2
CA Batna (Algeria)	4–4 (5–6 p)	(Libya) Al-Nasr	2–2	2–2
Dynamic Togolais (Togo)	0–0 (2–4 p)	(Niger) Sahel SC	0–0	0–0
USS Kraké (Benin)	2–5	(Morocco) Maghreb de Fès	1–1	1–4
Séwé Sports (Ivory Coast)	0–2	(Ghana) Ashanti Gold	0–1	0–1
Foullah Edifice (Chad)	2–1	(Equatorial Guinea) Sony Elá Nguema	2–0	0–1
ASA (Angola)	0–0 (4–5 p)	(Kenya) Sofapaka	0–0	0–0
Highlanders (Zimbabwe)	w/o^{1}	(Zambia) Nchanga Rangers	1–1	—
AS Adema (Madagascar)	1–1 (a)	(Mozambique) CD Maxaquene	0–0	1–1
US Sainte-Marienne (Réunion)	1–4	(South Africa) Wits	1–0	0–4
Centre Salif Keita (Mali)	3–3 (a)	(Morocco) Difaa El Jadida	2–2	1–1
Fovu Club (Cameroon)	3–4	(Burkina Faso) USFA	2–1	1–3
FC Séquence (Guinea)	1–2	(Ivory Coast) Africa Sports National	0–1	1–1
Diplomates (Central African Republic)	1–3	(Cameroon) Tiko United FC	0–0	1–3
KMKM (Zanzibar)	0–6	(Democratic Republic of the Congo) Motema Pembe	0–4	0–2
Mbabane Highlanders (Eswatini)	2–2 (1–4 p)	(Uganda) Victors	1–1	1–1
Young Africans (Tanzania)	4–6	(Ethiopia) Dedebit	4–4	0–2

Notes

- Note 1: Nchanga Rangers advanced to the first round after Highlanders withdrew following the first leg.

=== First round ===
Team 1	Agg.	Team 2	1st leg	2nd leg
JS Kabylie (Algeria)	3–1	(Mauritania) ASC Tevragh-Zeïna	1–0	2–1
Al-Nil Al-Hasahesa (Sudan)	2–3	(Gabon) Missile	1–1	1–2
1º de Agosto (Angola)	2–1	(Republic of the Congo) AC Léopards	2–0	0–1
FUS Rabat (Morocco)	3–2	(Senegal) Touré Kunda Footpro	2–0	1–2
Al-Khartoum (Sudan)	w/o^{2}	(Libya) Al-Nasr	—	—
Maghreb de Fès (Morocco)	2–1	(Niger) Sahel SC	0–0	2–1
Etoile Sahel (Tunisia)	4–2	(Ghana) Ashanti Gold	3–0	1–2
Kaduna United (Nigeria)	2–1	(Chad) Foullah Edifice	2–0	0–1
Ismaily (Egypt)	2–4	(Kenya) Sofapaka	2–0	0–4
Saint Eloi Lupopo (Democratic Republic of the Congo)	3–0	(Zambia) Nchanga Rangers	1–0	2–0
Wits (South Africa)	1–3	(Madagascar) AS Adema	1–1	0–2
Olympique Béja (Tunisia)	2–3	(Morocco) Difaa El Jadida	2–0	0–3
Africa Sports National (Ivory Coast)	w/o^{3}	(Burkina Faso) USFA	—	—
Sunshine Stars (Nigeria)	3–0	(Cameroon) Tiko United FC	2–0	1–0
Victors (Uganda)	1–2	(Democratic Republic of the Congo) Motema Pembe	1–1	0–1
Haras El Hodood (Egypt)	5–1	(Ethiopia) Dedebit	4–0	1–1

Notes

- Note 2: Al-Khartoum advanced to the second round after Al-Nasr withdrew. Tie was scheduled to be played over one leg due to the political situation in Libya, but match did not take place.
- Note 3: USFA advanced to the second round after Africa Sports National withdrew. Tie was scheduled to be played over one leg due to the political situation in Côte d'Ivoire, but match did not take place.

=== Second round ===
Team 1	Agg.	Team 2	1st leg	2nd leg
Missile (Gabon)	3–3 (0–3 p)	(Algeria) JS Kabylie	3–0	0–3
FUS Rabat (Morocco)	1–2	(Angola) 1º de Agosto	1–1	0–1
Maghreb de Fès (Morocco)	5–3	(Sudan) Al-Khartoum	5–1	0–2
Kaduna United (Nigeria)	w/o^{4}	(Tunisia) Etoile Sahel	—	—
Saint Eloi Lupopo (Democratic Republic of the Congo)	2–2 (a)	(Kenya) Sofapaka	2–1	0–1
Difaa El Jadida (Morocco)	3–1	(Madagascar) AS Adema	3–0	0–1
Sunshine Stars (Nigeria)	2–1	(Burkina Faso) USFA	2–0	0–1
Haras El Hodood (Egypt)	3–3 (3–4 p)	(Democratic Republic of the Congo) Motema Pembe	2–1	1–2

Notes

- Note 4: Kaduna United advanced to the play-off round after being awarded the tie by CAF, as Etoile Sahel refused to travel to Nigeria for the first leg due to security concerns arising from rioting in the country following the 2011 Nigerian presidential election.

=== Play-off round ===
In the play-off round, the winners from the second round play against the losers from the 2011 CAF Champions League second round. The winners of the CAF Confederation Cup second round host the second leg at home.

The draw for the play-off round and group stage was held on 15 May 2011. For the play-off round draw, the top-seeded loser from the Champions League and the top-seeded winner from the Confederation Cup would not be drawn against each other. Moreover, the winners of the two ties they are involved in would be drawn into different groups in the group stage draw.

Team 1	Agg.	Team 2	1st leg	2nd leg
ES Sétif (Algeria)	1–3	(Nigeria) Kaduna United	1–0	0–3
Diaraf (Senegal)	1–3	(Algeria) JS Kabylie	1–1	0–2
Club Africain (Tunisia)	4–3	(Kenya) Sofapaka	3–0	1–3
Al-Ittihad (Libya)	0–1	(Nigeria) Sunshine Stars	—^{5}	0–1
ZESCO United (Zambia)	1–2	(Morocco) Maghreb de Fès	1–0	0–2
Simba (Tanzania)	1–2	(Democratic Republic of the Congo) Motema Pembe	1–0	0–2
ASEC Mimosas (Ivory Coast)	5–1	(Angola) 1º de Agosto	4–0	1–1
Interclube (Angola)	5–2	(Morocco) Difaa El Jadida	3–0	2–2

Notes

- Note 5: Tie played over one leg due to the political situation in Libya.

== Group stage ==
Key to colours in group tables
Group winners and runners-up advance to the Semifinals

=== Group A ===
Team	Pld	W	D	L	GF	GA	GD	Pts	CA	INC	ASEC	KAD
(Tunisia) Club Africain	6	3	2	1	6	3	+3	11	—	2–0	1–0	0–0
(Angola) Interclube	6	3	1	2	8	6	+2	10	2–1	—	1–0	4–1
(Ivory Coast) ASEC Mimosas	6	2	1	3	5	6	−1	7	1–1	1–0	—	2–1
(Nigeria) Kaduna United	6	1	2	3	5	9	−4	5	0–1	1–1	2–1	—

Legend: Blue = home team win; Yellow = draw; Red = away team win.

=== Group B ===
Team	Pld	W	D	L	GF	GA	GD	Pts	MAS	SUN	DCMP	JSK
(Morocco) Maghreb de Fès	6	4	2	0	8	2	+6	14	—	1–0	3–0	1–0
(Nigeria) Sunshine Stars	6	3	2	1	6	3	+3	11	1–1	—	2–0	1–0
(Democratic Republic of the Congo) Motema Pembe	6	2	2	2	5	6	−1	8	1–1	0–0	—	2–0
(Algeria) JS Kabylie	6	0	0	6	1	9	−8	0	0–1	1–2	0–2	—

Legend: Blue = home team win; Yellow = draw; Red = away team win.

== Knock-out stage ==
=== Bracket ===
Semi-Finals
1	(Nigeria) Sunshine Stars	0	0	0
4	(Tunisia) Club Africain	1	0	1
3	(Angola) Interclube	2	0	2
2	(Morocco) Maghreb de Fès (a)	1	1	2

Final
(Tunisia) Club Africain	1	0	1 (5)
(Morocco) Maghreb de Fès (p)	0	1	1 (6)

=== Semifinals ===
Team 1	Agg.	Team 2	1st leg	2nd leg
Sunshine Stars (Nigeria)	0–1	(Tunisia) Club Africain	0–1	0–0
Interclube (Angola)	2–2 (a)	(Morocco) Maghreb de Fès	2–1	0–1

=== Final ===
19 November 2011
18:00 UTC+01:00

Club Africain (Tunisia)	1–0	(Morocco) Maghreb de Fès
Enam 8'	Report

Stade 14 January, Radès
Referee: Djamel Haimoudi (Algeria)
4 December 2011
18:30 UTC±00:00

Maghreb de Fès (Morocco)	1–0	(Tunisia) Club Africain
Tigana 45+3'	Report
Penalties
Chtibi (penalty scored); Haji (penalty missed); El Yousfi (penalty scored); Dahmani (penalty scored); Abourazzouk (penalty scored); El Basri (penalty scored); Zniti (penalty scored)	6–5	(penalty missed) Reguiî; (penalty scored) Ifa; (penalty scored) Yacoubi; (penalty scored) Akremi; (penalty scored) Dhaouadi; (penalty scored) Mendomo; (penalty missed) Ziadi

Fes Stadium, Fes
Referee: Badara Diatta (Senegal)

== Top goalscorers ==
The top scorers from the 2011 CAF Confederation Cup are as follows:

Rank	Name	Team	Goals
1	(Democratic Republic of the Congo) Salakiaku Matondo	(Democratic Republic of the Congo) DC Motema Pembe	6
2	(Morocco) Hamza Abourazzouk	(Morocco) Maghreb de Fès	5
2	(Morocco) Tarik Sektioui	(Morocco) Maghreb de Fès	5
4	(Algeria) Chemseddine Nessakh	(Algeria) JS Kabylie	4
4	(Nigeria) Jude Aneke	(Nigeria) Kaduna United	4
4	(Nigeria) Ajani Ibrahim	(Nigeria) Sunshine Stars	4

== See also ==
- 2011 CAF Champions League
- 2012 CAF Super Cup
