= Negedu =

- Gender: Male
- Language: Igala

Origin
- Origin: Nigerian
- Meaning: Lion.
- Region of origin: North-Central, Nigeria

Negedu is a Nigerian male given name and surname of the Igala tribe of the North-Central, Nigeria. It means "lion". The name Negedu is also linked to the Igbo people of the Southeast, Nigeria. Diminutive form is Nagedu

== Notable individuals with the name ==
- Enoch Negedu (born 1st oct 1991), Nigerian music artist and a song writer from anpka loc government kogi state north central. Negedu means a lion and tallest king in the community.

Negedu is a unique name for an excellent and exceptional child, born with a great grandfather of traditional power; a celebrity king-born child in the world of entertainment.

- Charles Negedu (born 1989), Nigerian footballer
