= 2011 CAF Confederation Cup knockout stage =

The 2011 CAF Confederation Cup knock-out stage matches were scheduled to take place between October and December 2011. The matchdays are: 14–16 October (semifinals first leg), 28–30 October (semifinals second leg), 18–20 November (final first leg), 2–4 December (final second leg).

All knock-out ties were decided over two legs, with aggregate goals used to determine the winner. If the sides were level on aggregate after the second leg, the away goals rule applied, and if still level, the tie proceeded directly to a penalty shootout (no extra time is played).

== Qualified teams ==
The knock-out stage featured four teams: the two group winners and the two group runners-up from the group stage. In the semi-finals, the group A winners played the group B runners-up, and the group B winners played the group A runners-up. In both ties, the group winners hosted the second leg at home.

Group	Winners	Runners-up
A	(Tunisia) Club Africain	(Angola) Interclube
B	(Morocco) Maghreb de Fès	(Nigeria) Sunshine Stars

== Semifinals ==
15 October 2011
15:00 UTC+01:00

Sunshine Stars (Nigeria)	0 – 1	(Tunisia) Club Africain
	Report	Ezechiel Ndouassel 54'

Gateway Stadium, Ijebu Ode
29 October 2011
18:00 UTC+01:00

Club Africain (Tunisia)	0 – 0	(Nigeria) Sunshine Stars
	Report

Stade El Menzah, Tunis

Club Africain won 1–0 on aggregate and advanced to the 2011 CAF Confederation Cup Final.

16 October 2011
17:30 UTC+01:00

Interclube (Angola)	2 – 1	(Morocco) Maghreb de Fès
Moco 84', 90'	Report	Abdelhadi Halhoul 39'

Estádio Joaquim Dinis, Luanda
30 October 2011
19:00 UTC±00:00

Maghreb de Fès (Morocco)	1 – 0	(Angola) Interclube
Chemseddine Chtibi 90+7'	Report

Fes Stadium, Fes

2–2 on aggregate; Maghreb de Fès won on the away goals rule and advanced to the 2011 CAF Confederation Cup Final.

== Final ==
19 November 2011
18:00 UTC+01:00

Club Africain (Tunisia)	1 – 0	(Morocco) Maghreb de Fès
Alexis Enam 8'	Report

Olympic Stadium, Tunis
4 December 2011
18:30 UTC±00:00

Maghreb de Fès (Morocco)	1 – 0	(Tunisia) Club Africain
Moussa Tigana 45+3'	Report
Penalties
	6 – 5

Fes Stadium, Fes

1–1 on aggregate; Maghreb de Fès won on penalties.
