= James Johnson (Nigerian footballer) =

Nigerian footballer (born 1979)

Personal information
- Date of birth: 1983 or 1984
- Place of birth: Ikeja, Nigeria
- Position: Striker

Senior career*
Years	Team	Apps	(Gls)
????	Vero Bim	?	(?)
????	Jegede Babes	?	(?)
????	Flying Eagles	?	(?)
????	Crown FC	?	(?)
????	Plateau United	?	(?)

International career
199?-1999	Nigeria	1+	(0+)

Managerial career
- 2002: FCT Queens
- * Club domestic league appearances and goals

James Johnson (born Iyabo Abade) is a Nigerian former professional footballer who played as a striker for the Nigeria women's national team. He began his career in the youth setup at Vero Bim FC and later represented the Super Falcons. He was excluded from his club and national teams after he was ascertained as an intersex individual in 1999. In 2004, Johnson began the process of gender transition, and after completing the process took up his current name.

== Biography ==
James Johnson was born in Ikeja, on the outskirts of Lagos, and was raised in a village in southeastern Nigeria.

At the age of 11, Johnson was registered with Vero Bim FC, a newly promoted top division club in Nigeria. Initially he played for recreation before being discovered by a local soccer coach in the Agege area of Lagos. He later represented the club Jegede Babes, where he set a record for the most number of goals scored in a single season with 38 goals in 1998.

Johnson's performance in a domestic match against one of the country's leading women's clubs attracted the attention of Ismaila Mabo, the coach of the women's national team, who recruited him to the team. Within a few months, he progressed from amateur football to representing the national team, for whom he played as a striker for the team for several seasons.

During the 1998 African Women's Championship, Johnson's shorts were pulled down in the middle of a pitch by an opponent, which he described as one of the worst experiences of his life in an interview with the BBC later. Later that year, on the eve of his participation in the Nigerian Women's Premier League, he was excluded from his club team after being identified as intersex. As the news became public knowledge, he was dropped from the official squad of the national team for the 1999 FIFA Women's World Cup in the United States just before the start of the tournament. Johnson later joined FCT Queens, a club based in the Nigerian capital of Abuja. While he was unable to register as a player, he remained with the club as an assistant coach, contributing to the team's Women's FA Cup win in 2002.

Following this period, Johnson traveled to the United States in 2004 and underwent the first of several gender affirming surgeries at the Midway Hospital in Los Angeles, performed by Dr. Gary Alter and his team. The surgery cost more than US$450,000 and was funded by the Nigerian minister Muhammed Abba Gana. After the gender transition, he legally adopted the name James Johnson. He returned to football, playing for the Flying Eagles and Crown FC. However, he was dismissed from both the clubs after his background became known. A similar situation occurred later at Plateau United.
