= 1998 African Women's Championship =

1st edition of WAFCON

Tournament details
- Host country: Nigeria
- Dates: 17 – 31 October
- Teams: 8
- Venues: 2 (in 2 host cities)

Final positions
- Champions: Nigeria (3rd title)
- Runners-up: Ghana
- Third place: DR Congo
- Fourth place: Cameroon

Tournament statistics
- Matches played: 13
- Goals scored: 62 (4.77 per match)
- Top scorer(s): (Nigeria) Nkiru Okosieme (3 goals)

The 1998 African Women's Championship was the first official staging of the biennial African Women's Championship tournament organised by the Confederation of African Football (CAF). Since this edition, the tournament has been organized biennially and was hosted by a country unlike the previous two editions.

It was hosted from 17 to 31 October by Nigeria whose women's team successfully defended its title, winning it for a 3rd time after beating Ghana 2–0 in the final. Both finalists qualified for the following year's FIFA Women's World Cup in the United States.

== Qualification ==
A qualification round was installed in the tournament for the first time. With Nigeria qualifying automatically as hosts, the remaining seven spots were determined by a qualification round and a play-off round which took place between March and April 1998.

Team 1	Agg.	Team 2	1st leg	2nd leg
Mozambique	7 – 2	Lesotho	3–0	4–2
South Africa	15 – 0	Swaziland	9–0	6 – 0
Egypt	2 – 1	Uganda	1–1	1–0
Ghana	19 – 0	Guinea	11–0	8–0
DR Congo	w/o	Namibia	—	—
Cameroon	w/o	Sierra Leone	—	—
Morocco	w/o	Kenya	—	—

First leg:

28 March 1998

Mozambique	3–0	Lesotho

Mozambique

Second leg:

12 April 1998

Lesotho	2–4	Mozambique

Maseru

Mozambique won 7–2 on aggregate and qualified for the main tournament.

29 March 1998

South Africa	9–0	Swaziland
	Report

Johannesburg
11 April 1998

Swaziland	0–6	South Africa
	Report

Somhlolo National Stadium, Lobamba

South Africa won 15–0 on aggregate and qualified for the main tournament.

29 March 1998

Egypt	1–1	Uganda

Cairo
10 April 1998

Uganda	0–1	Egypt

Nakivubo Stadium, Kampala

Egypt won 2–1 on aggregate and qualified for the main tournament.

29 March 1998

Ghana	11–0	Guinea
	Report

Accra Sports Stadium, Accra
12 April 1998

Guinea	0–8	Ghana

Conakry

Ghana won 19–0 on aggregate and qualified for the main tournament.

DR Congo	Cancelled	Namibia

DR Congo won by default and qualified for the main tournament.

Cameroon	Cancelled	Sierra Leone

Cameroon won by default and qualified for the main tournament.

Morocco	Cancelled	Kenya

Morocco won by default and qualified for the main tournament.

=== Qualified teams ===
DR Congo, Egypt and Morocco made their debuts in the tournament at this edition. Mozambique failed to arrive for the tournament despite qualifying with Lesotho as its late replacement for Mozambique, also failing to show up.

Team	Appearance	Previous best appearance
Cameroon	2nd	Runners-up (1991)
DR Congo	1st	Debut
Egypt	1st	Debut
Ghana	3rd	Semi-finals (1995)
Morocco	1st	Debut
Mozambique	1st	Debut
Nigeria (hosts)	3rd	Champions (1991, 1995)
South Africa	2nd	Runners-up (1995)

== Venues ==
Kaduna	1998 African Women's Championship is located in Nigeria	Ijebu Ode
Ahmadu Bello Stadium	1998 African Women's Championship is located in Nigeria	Gateway Stadium
Capacity: 16,000	1998 African Women's Championship is located in Nigeria	Capacity: 20,000

== Group stage ==
=== Tiebreakers ===
If two or more teams in the group stage are tied on points tie-breakers are in order:

1. greater number of points in matches between tied teams
2. superior goal difference in matches between tied teams
3. greater number of goals scored in matches between tied teams
4. superior goal difference in all group matches
5. greater number of goals scored in all group matches
6. fair play criteria based on red and yellow cards received
7. drawing of lots

=== Group A ===
Pos	Team	Pld	W	D	L	GF	GA	GD	Pts	Qualification
1	Nigeria (H)	3	3	0	0	20	0	+20	9	Advance to knockout stage
2	DR Congo	3	1	1	1	4	7	−3	4 (Note: Tied on head-to-head points. Overall goal difference: DR Congo −3, Morocco −5.)	Advance to knockout stage
3	Morocco	3	1	1	1	4	9	−5	4	
4	Egypt	3	0	0	3	2	14	−12	0	

Rules for classification: Group stage tiebreakers
(H) Hosts
Notes:
17 October 1998

Nigeria	8–0	Morocco
	Report

Ahmadu Bello Stadium, Kaduna
17 October 1998

DR Congo	4–1	Egypt

Ahmadu Bello Stadium, Kaduna

20 October 1998

Morocco	4–1	Egypt

Ahmadu Bello Stadium, Kaduna
20 October 1998

Nigeria	6–0	DR Congo

Ahmadu Bello Stadium, Kaduna

23 October 1998

Morocco	0–0	DR Congo

Ahmadu Bello Stadium, Kaduna
23 October 1998

Nigeria	6–0	Egypt

Ahmadu Bello Stadium, Kaduna

=== Group B ===
Pos	Team	Pld	W	D	L	GF	GA	GD	Pts	Qualification
1	Ghana	2	2	0	0	7	1	+6	6	Advance to knockout stage
2	Cameroon	2	1	0	1	4	5	−1	3	Advance to knockout stage
3	South Africa	2	0	0	2	2	7	−5	0	

Rules for classification: Group stage tiebreakers

Mozambique was also drawn into this group, but withdrew before playing.

18 October 1998

Ghana	4–0	South Africa

Gateway Stadium, Ijebu Ode

21 October 1998

Cameroon	3–2	South Africa

Gateway Stadium, Ijebu Ode

24 October 1998

Ghana	3–1	Cameroon

Gateway Stadium, Ijebu Ode

== Knockout stage ==
Semi-finals
27 October - Kaduna
Nigeria	6
Cameroon	0
27 October - Kaduna
Ghana (a.e.t.)	4
DR Congo	1

Final
31 October - Ijebu Ode
Nigeria	2
Ghana	0
Third place play-off
30 October - Ijebu Ode
Cameroon	3 (1)
DR Congo (p)	3 (3)

=== Semi-finals ===
Winners qualified for the 1999 FIFA Women's World Cup in the United States.

27 October 1998

Nigeria	6–0	Cameroon

Ahmadu Bello Stadium, Kaduna

27 October 1998

Ghana	4–1	DR Congo

Ahmadu Bello Stadium, Kaduna

=== Third place play-off ===
30 October 1998

DR Congo	3–3 (a.e.t.)	Cameroon
Penalties
	3–1

Gateway Stadium, Ijebu Ode

=== Final ===
31 October 1998

Nigeria	2–0	Ghana
Okosieme 43'; Mbachu 64'

Gateway Stadium, Ijebu Ode
Attendance: 30,000

== Awards ==
1998 African Women's Championship winners

Nigeria
3rd title

== Statistics ==
=== Team statistics ===
Pos.	Team	Pld	W	D	L	Pts	GF	GA	GD
1	Nigeria	5	5	0	0	15	28	0	+28
2	Ghana	4	3	0	1	9	11	4	+7
3	DR Congo	5	1	2	2	5	8	14	−6
4	Cameroon	4	1	1	2	4	7	14	−7
**Eliminated in the group stage**
5	Morocco	3	1	1	1	4	4	9	−5
6	South Africa	2	0	0	2	0	2	7	−5
7	Egypt	3	0	0	3	0	2	14	−12
—	Mozambique	0	0	0	0	0	0	0	0
Total		12^{(1)}	11	1^{(2)}	11	35	62	62	0

Team(s) rendered in italics represent(s) the host nation(s). The competition's winning team is rendered in bold.
^{(1)} – Total games lost not counted in total games played (total games lost = total games won)
^{(2)} – Total number of games drawn (tied) for all teams = Total number of games drawn (tied) ÷ 2 (both teams involved)

=== Goalscorers ===
3 goals

- (Nigeria) Nkiru Okosieme

2 goals

- (Nigeria) Patience Avre
- (Nigeria) Rita Nwadike

1 goal

- (Nigeria) Mercy Akide
- (Nigeria) Stella Mbachu
- (Nigeria) Florence Omagbemi

Unknown scorers

- Nigeria : 18 additional goals.
- Ghana : 11 additional goals.
- DR Congo : 8 additional goals.
- Cameroon : 7 additional goals.
- Morocco : 4 additional goals.
- South Africa : 2 additional goals.
- Egypt : 2 additional goals.

== Controversies ==
During the tournament, Nigerian Iyabo Abade's shorts were pulled down in the middle of a pitch by an opponent, after Ayabo was suspected to be intersex. Ayabo later described the incident as one of the worst experiences of her life.
