= Dipo Dina =

Nigerian politician (1960–2010)

Otunba Dipo Dina
- Born: Adedipupo; 15 July 1960; Ijebu Ode, Ogun State, Nigeria
- Died: 25 January 2010 (aged 49)
- Citizenship: Nigerian
- Education: University of Lagos
- Occupations: Politician, philanthropist
- Political party: Action Congress

Otunba Dipo Dina (15 July 1960 – 25 January 2010) was a Nigerian politician, philanthropist, administrator, community leader and chartered accountant from Ogun State.

== Early life and career ==
Adedipupo Akanni Dina// was born on 15 July 1960, into the Dipo Alapo Ekun family of Iyanro, Ijebu Ode, Ogun State. He had his secondary education at the Baptist Academy, Lagos, before going on to the University of Lagos where he got his first degree in Accounting and later M.Sc. in finance. He became a Chartered Accountant in 1984 and subsequently founded and until his death was Senior Partner at Dele Dina & Co. (an accounting firm). Between 1997 and 1999 Dipo served as the chairman of Ogun State Bulk Purchase Commission where he reportedly donated his salaries and allowances to the School of the Handicapped, in Ijebu Ode.

=== Political background ===
Dipo ventured into active politics in 2003 and became the Ogun State governorship candidate in the 2007 election after he joined the defunct Action Congress (AC). He was reported to have awarded bursaries to about 400 students in the state annually, and during his governorship campaign in 2007, about four million free exercise books were given to primary, secondary and tertiary institutions in the state. He founded the ‘Ogunnet’, a non-governmental organisation, to execute his political programmes.

== Death ==
On 25 January 2010, on his way to his home on Dolphin Estate, Ikoyi, Dina Dipo was abducted and taken in another car to an unknown destination where he was assassinated, the assailant reportedly spared the lives of two other passengers including his driver.

== Memorial ==
The Otunba Dipo Dina International Stadium in Ijebu-Ode was named in his honour by the former governor Ibikunle Amosun.
