= Ahmadu Bello Stadium =

Multi-purpose stadium in Kaduna, Kaduna State, Nigeria

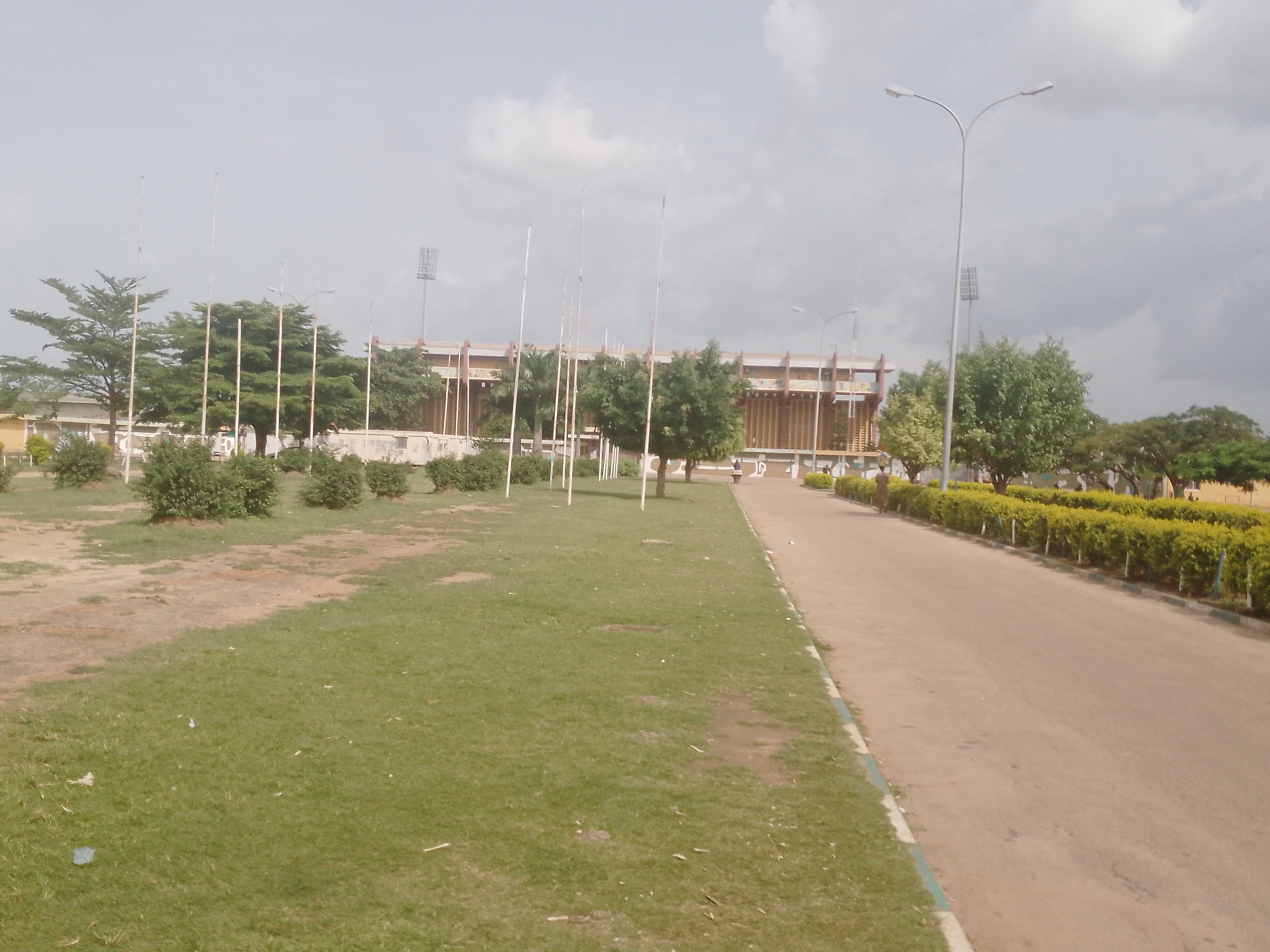
- Interactive map of Ahmadu Bello Stadium
- Location: Kaduna
- Coordinates: 10°29′51″N 7°22′54″E
- Capacity: 16,000

Construction
- Built: 1965
- Opened: 1965
- Architect: Jane Drew and Maxwell Fry

Tenants
- Kaduna United F.C.

The Ahmadu Bello Stadium, simply referred to as ABS is a multi-purpose stadium in Kaduna City, Kaduna State, Nigeria. It was designed in 1965 by the English architects Jane Drew and Maxwell Fry. As of 2016, it is used mostly for football matches. The stadium has a capacity of 16,000 people.

The stadium consists of a main section for track and field events as well as football and two indoor sports centres.

On February 26, 2026, the National Sports Commission transferred the stadium to the Kaduna State Government for rehabilitation. The rehabilitation project will expand the stadium's capacity to 32,000.

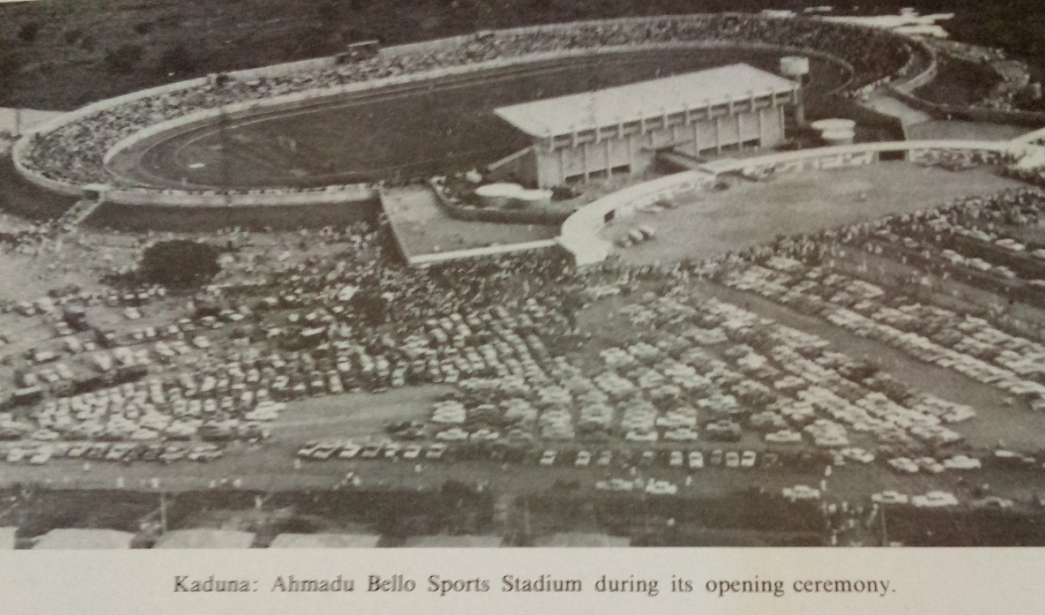
Ahmadu Bello Stadium during the opening ceremony.

== Notable football events ==
=== 1998 African Women's Championship ===
Date	Team 1	Result	Team 2	Round
17 October 1998	Nigeria	8–0	Morocco	Group A
17 October 1998	DR Congo	4–1	Egypt	Group A
20 October 1998	Morocco	4–1	Egypt	Group A
20 October 1998	Nigeria	6–0	DR Congo	Group A
23 October 1998	Morocco	0–0	DR Congo	Group A
23 October 1998	Nigeria	6–0	Egypt	Group A
27 October 1998	Nigeria	6–0	Cameroon	Semi-finals
27 October 1998	Ghana	4–1 (a.e.t.)	DR Congo	Semi-finals

=== 1999 FIFA World Youth Championship ===
Date	Team 1	Result	Team 2	Attendance	Round
4 April 1999	Ghana	1–1	Croatia	16,000	Group B
4 April 1999	Argentina	1–0	Kazakhstan	16,000	Group B
7 April 1999	Ghana	1–0	Argentina	5,000	Group B
7 April 1999	Croatia	5–1	Kazakhstan	5,000	Group B
10 April 1999	Ghana	3–0	Kazakhstan	2,000	Group B
10 April 1999	Croatia	0–0	Argentina	4,000	Group B
14 April 1999	Ghana	2–0	Costa Rica	1,000	Round of 16
18 April 1999	Spain	1–1 (a.e.t.) (8–7 p)	Ghana	19,000	Quarter-final
21 April 1999	Mali	1–3	Spain	6,000	Semi-final

=== 2009 FIFA U-17 World Cup ===
Date	Team 1	Result	Team 2	Attendance	Round
26 October 2009	Uruguay	1–3	South Korea	13,700	Group F
26 October 2009	Algeria	0–1	Italy	18,418	Group F
29 October 2009	Italy	2–1	South Korea	11,400	Group F
29 October 2009	Uruguay	2–0	Algeria	13,879	Group F
1 November 2009	South Korea	2–0	Algeria	14,755	Group F
4 November 2009	Italy	2–1	United States	11,301	Round of 16
9 November 2009	Spain	3–3 (a.e.t.) (4–2 p)	Uruguay	10,281	Quarter-final
