= Charles Negedu =

Nigerian footballer

Charly Negedu
Personal information
- Full name: Charles Negedu
- Date of birth: October 10, 1989 (age 37)
- Place of birth: Kaduna, Nigeria
- Height: 1.90 m (6 ft 3 in)
- Position: Midfielder

Team information
- Current team: Enugu Rangers
- Number: 7

Youth career
- Kaduna United F.C.

Senior career*
Years	Team	Apps	(Gls)
2007–2009	Kaduna United		
2009	ES Sahel		
2010	Kaduna United		
2010	Olympique Beja		
2011–	Enugu Rangers		
- * Club domestic league appearances and goals

Charles Negedu (born 10 October 1989 in Kaduna) is a football player, who currently plays for Enugu Rangers.

== Career ==
Negedu began his career with Kaduna United F.C. who was 2007 promoted to the Nigerian Premier League team and left 15 January 2009 his native Nigeria to sign with Tunisian top club ES Sahel a five years contract. But after only one year in December 2009 his club ES Sahel resigns the contract and he turned back to Kaduna United F.C. After the season 200 with Kaduna United F.C. signed in summer 2010 with Tunisian side Olympique Béja.
