= FC Séquence de Dixinn =

Guinean football club

Séquence de Dixinn
- Full name: Football Club Séquence de Dixinn
- Ground: Stade du 28 Septembre
- Capacity: 35,000
- Chairman: Idrissa Diallo
- Manager: Aboubacar Sylla
- League: Ligue 2
- 2024–25: 5th, Ligue 2, Group A

FC Séquence de Dixinn is an association football club from Guinea based in Dixinn. They play their home games at 35,000 capacity Stade du 28 Septembre.

== Achievements ==
- Guinée Coupe Nationale: 3

Winner: 2010, 2011, 2012

- Guinée Super Coupe: 2

Winner: 2010, 2011

== Performance in CAF competitions ==
- CAF Confederation Cup: 2 appearances

2011 – Preliminary round
2012 – First Round

== Current players ==
Note: Flags indicate national team as defined under FIFA eligibility rules; some limited exceptions apply. Players may hold more than one non-FIFA nationality.

| No. | Pos. | Nation | Player |
