= Derrick Kabwe =

Zambian footballer (born 1983)

Personal information
- Date of birth: 29 October 1983 (age 43)
- Place of birth: Luanshya, Zambia
- Position: Forward

Senior career*
Years	Team	Apps	(Gls)
2003–2009	Roan United F.C.		
2010–2011	ZESCO United F.C.		
2012	Dynamos F.C.		
2013	Roan United F.C.		

International career
2009	Zambia	1	(0)
- * Club domestic league appearances and goals

Derrick Kabwe (born 29 October 1983) is a retired Zambian football striker.
