= Ryan Chapman (soccer) =

South African soccer player

Personal information
- Date of birth: 14 April 1987 (age 39)
- Place of birth: Cape Town, South Africa
- Position: Striker

Team information
- Current team: Royal Eagles

Youth career
- Brakpan Nomads
- Benaero 74
- Boksburg FC
- Orlando Pirates
- Benoni Northerns
- Santos Cape Town

Senior career*
Years	Team	Apps	(Gls)
2006–2010	Engen Santos	68	(9)
2010–2016	Bidvest Wits	74	(21)
2014–2015	→ Supersport United (loan)	16	(0)
2015–2016	→ Golden Arrows (loan)	11	(1)
2016–2017	Santos Cape Town	5	(0)
2017	Pretoria	14	(6)
2017	Stellenbosch	11	(1)
2018–	Royal Eagles	1	(0)

International career
2012	South Africa	5	(0)
- * Club domestic league appearances and goals as of 3 April 2018

Ryan Chapman (born 14 April 1987 in Cape Town, Western Cape) is a South African footballer who plays as a striker for Royal Eagles.
