= Rabiu Baita =

Nigerian football player

Rabiu Baita was a Nigerian footballer.

== International ==
He was 2002 nominated in the 36 man squad for the Fifa World Cup 2002, his first game for the Nigeria national football team was on 20 June 2004 Vs. Angola.
