= Evrard Zag =

Ivorian footballer

Personal information
- Full name: Hugues Evrard Zagbayou
- Date of birth: 14 May 1990 (age 36)
- Place of birth: Gagnoa, Ivory Coast
- Height: 1.72 m (5 ft 8 in)
- Position: Midfielder

Youth career
- 2000–2008: ASEC Mimosas

Senior career*
Years	Team	Apps	(Gls)
2008–2014	ASEC Mimosas		
2014–2015	AD Oliveirense	13	(0)
2015–2017	Salgueiros	23	(1)
2017–2022	Vizela	69	(2)
2022–2026	Leixões	102	(0)

International career
2013	Ivory Coast	1	(0)
- * Club domestic league appearances and goals

Hugues Evrard Zagbayou (born 14 May 1990), better known as just Evrard Zag, is an Ivorian former professional footballer who played as a midfielder.

== Professional career ==
Zag began his senior career with the Ivorian club ASEC Mimosas in 2008, before moving to Portugal with Oliveirense in 2014. After a stint with Salgueiros, he moved to Vizela in 2017. He made his professional debut with Vizela in a 2–1 LigaPro win over Oliveirense on 12 September 2020.

== International career ==
Zag debuted for the Ivory Coast national team in a 2–0 2014 African Nations Championship qualification win over Nigeria on 27 July 2013.
