= Ranchers Bees Stadium =

Multi-purpose arena in Kaduna, Nigeria

Coordinates: 10°31′14″N 7°26′20″E

Ranchers Bees Stadium (a.k.a. Kaduna Township Stadium) is a multi-purpose arena in Kaduna, Nigeria. It is currently used mostly for football matches and is the home stadium of Ranchers Bees Football Club (a.k.a. Aruwa Boys) and Kaduna United Football Club. Kada City FC use the Ranchers Bees Stadium for home games in the NPFL.

The stadium has a capacity of 10,000 people.
