= Jude Aneke =

Nigerian footballer

Personal information
- Full name: Jude Oluchukwu Aneke
- Date of birth: April 23, 1990 (age 36)
- Place of birth: Enugu, Nigeria
- Height: 1.84 m (6 ft 0 in)
- Position: Forward

Team information
- Current team: Ikorodu United

Senior career*
Years	Team	Apps	(Gls)
2009–2010	Anambra United		(13)
2011–2012	Kaduna United		(20)
2012	Warri Wolves		
2013	Al-Masry		
2014–2015	Spartak Semey		
2016	Plateau United		
2017–	Ikorodu United	8	(6)

International career^{‡}
2011	Nigeria U23	2	(0)
2011–	Nigeria	1	(0)
- * Club domestic league appearances and goals as of 2 August 2017 ‡ National team caps and goals as of 18 July 2014

Jude Aneke // (born April 23, 1990, in Enugu) is a Nigerian forward playing for Ikorodu United F.C.

== Career ==
He started his career at Young Planners FC and Ebonyi Angels F.C. before moving to Anambra United.

Aneke joined Kaduna United during the 2009-10 season from lower division side Anambra United and scored 13 goals in all competitions, including 10 in the league. He won the 2010 Nigerian FA Cup with the club.

In November 2011, Aneke broke the 1-year-old record of Ahmed Musa by scoring his 19th and 20th goal in league play. A week later, he was called up to the Nigeria national football team to replace an injured Peter Odemwingie. In 2012, Aneke joined Warri Wolves, before transferring to Al-Masry, off Port Said, Egypt, in August of that year. Aneke got interest from Clubs in Turkish Premier League and also from giant Romanian Rapid Bucarest. On 18 July 2014, Aneke signed for Kazakhstan Premier League side FC Spartak Semey. He returned to Nigeria and in June 2016 signed for Plateau United. In 2017 he signed for Ikorodu United.

== Achievements ==
- Nigerian Super Cup

Winner (1): 2010

== Honours ==
Nigeria Premier League Top Scorer (1): 2012
