= Zied Ziadi =

Tunisian footballer

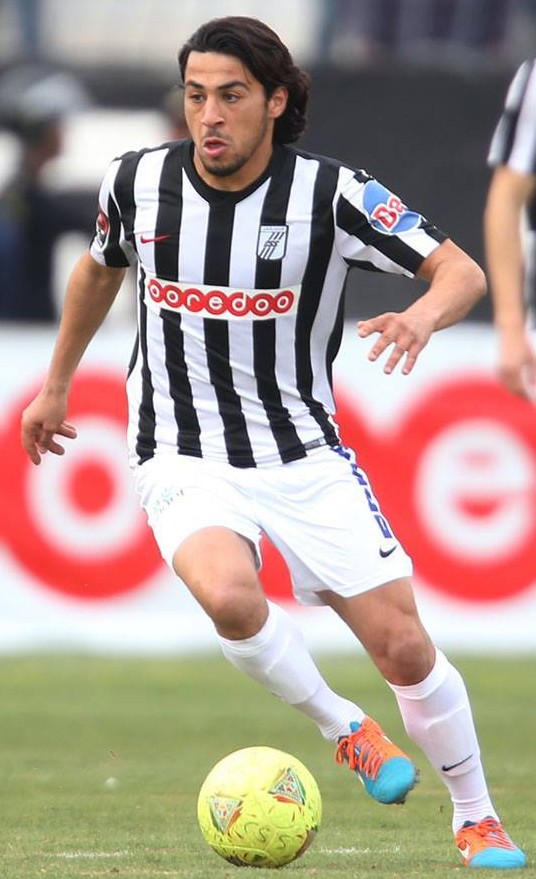
- Ziadi playing for CS Sfaxien in 2015

Personal information
- Date of birth: 23 September 1990 (age 36)
- Place of birth: Tunis, Tunisia
- Height: 1.76 m (5 ft 9 in)
- Position: Midfielder

Team information
- Current team: Al-Ahli

Senior career*
Years	Team	Apps	(Gls)
2010–2013	Club Africain		
2013–2017	CS Hammam-Lif		
2015	→ CS Sfaxien (loan)		
2017–2018	Al-Muharraq		
2018–2019	CS Hammam-Lif		
2019	Al-Nahda		
2020–	Al-Ahli		
- * Club domestic league appearances and goals

Zied Ziadi (born 23 September 1990) is a retired Tunisian football midfielder plays for Al-Ahli.
