= Otunba Dipo Dina International Stadium =

Multi-use stadium in Ijebu-Ode, Nigeria

Coordinates: 6°49′15″N 3°55′13″E

- Interactive map of Otunba Dipo Dina International Stadium
- Former names: Gateway Stadium
- Location: Ijebu-Ode, Nigeria
- Capacity: 20,000

Otunba Dipo Dina International Stadium, formerly the Gateway Stadium, is a multi-use stadium in Ijebu-Ode, Nigeria. It is currently used mostly for football matches and is the home ground for Atlantic Business FC.

It was formerly the home ground for FC Ebedei before they moved to their own stadium in Sagamu.

During the 2024–25 Nigeria Premier Football League season, Sunshine Stars F.C. relocated there temporarily while their home ground in Ondo State was being renovated.

The stadium has a capacity of 20,000 people. It was renovated for the 2009 FIFA U-17 World Cup.

The stadium was renamed in 2011 after Otunba Dipo Dina, an assassinated political candidate.

== Photo gallery ==
Some important Views of the stadium

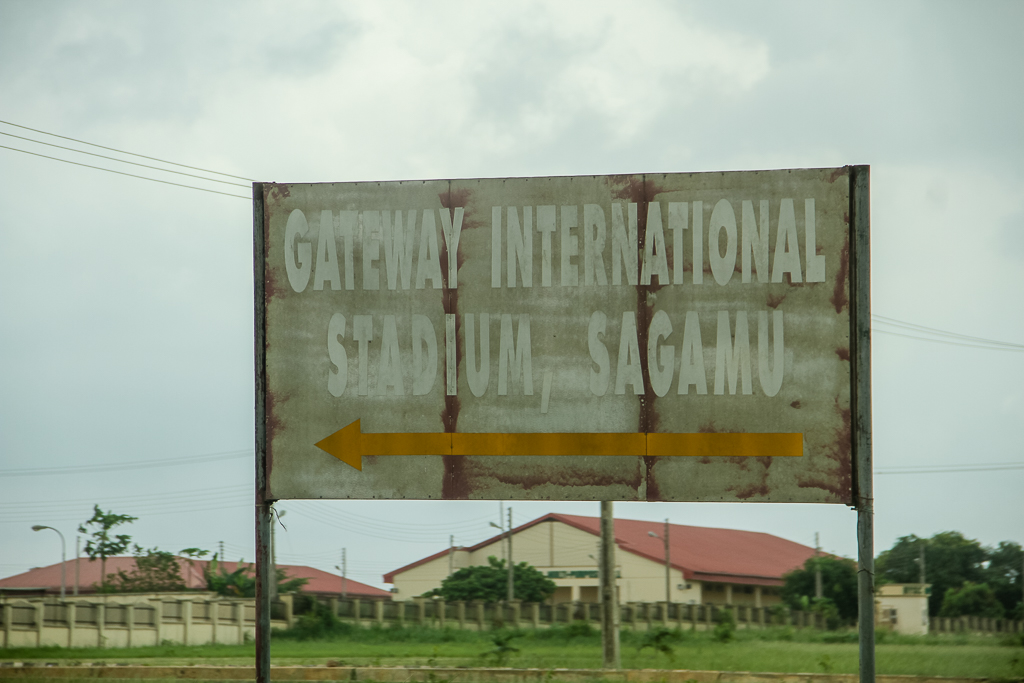
Gateway International Stadium sign-post, Sagamu, Ogun state

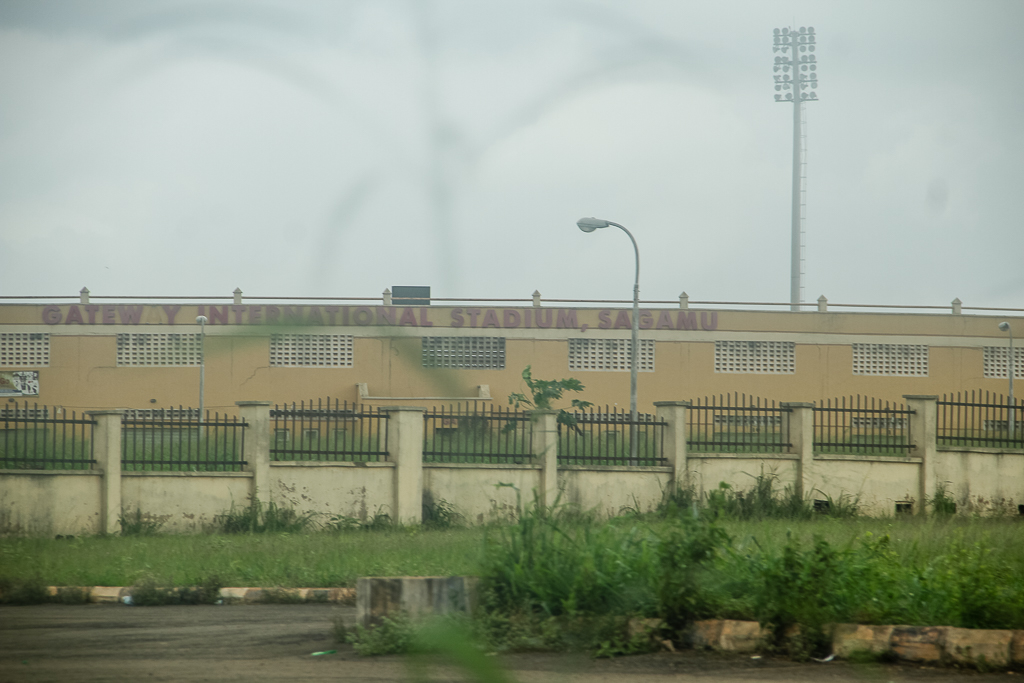
Gateway International Stadium, Sagamu, Ogun state

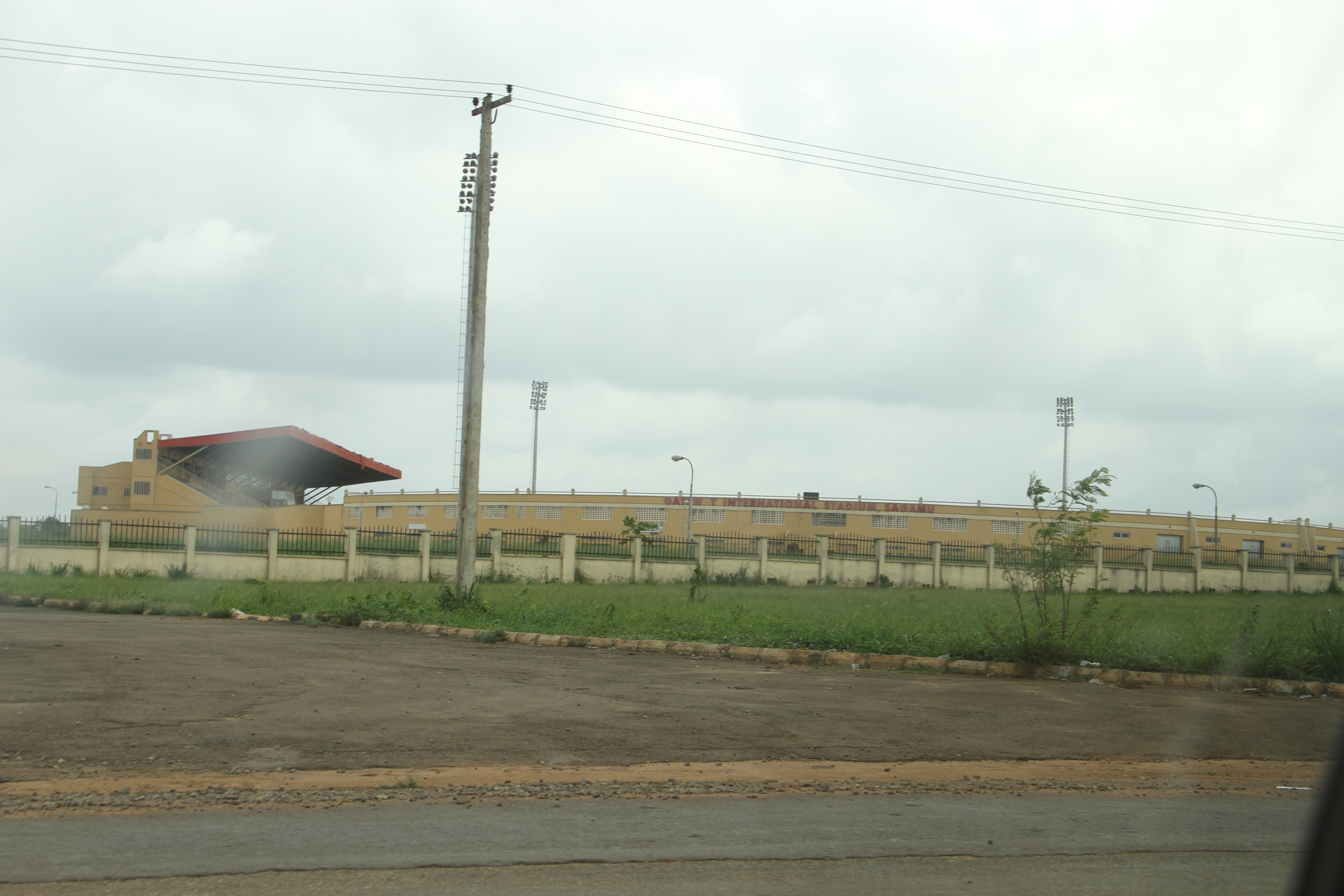
Gateway Stadium 2

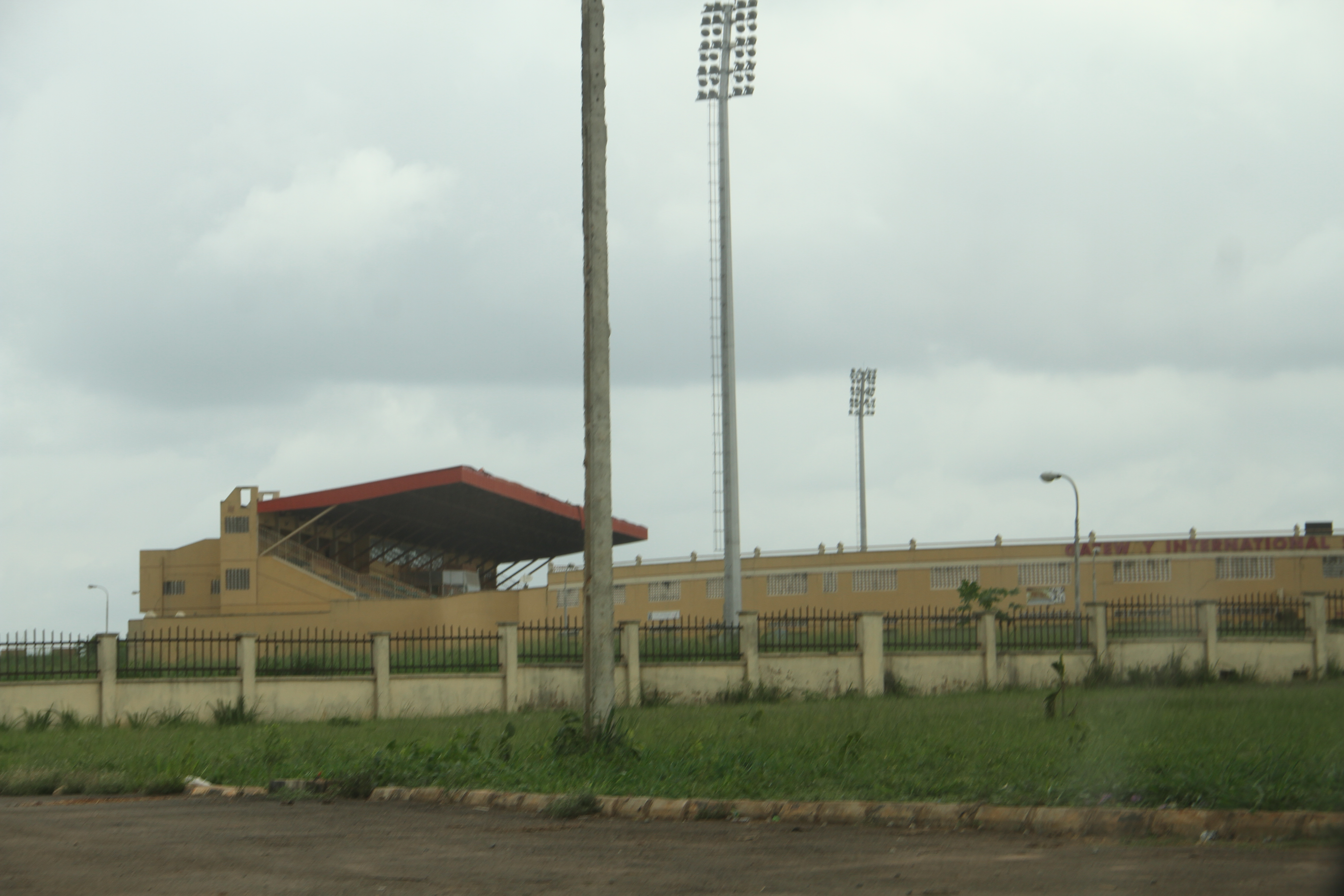
Gateway Stadium 3

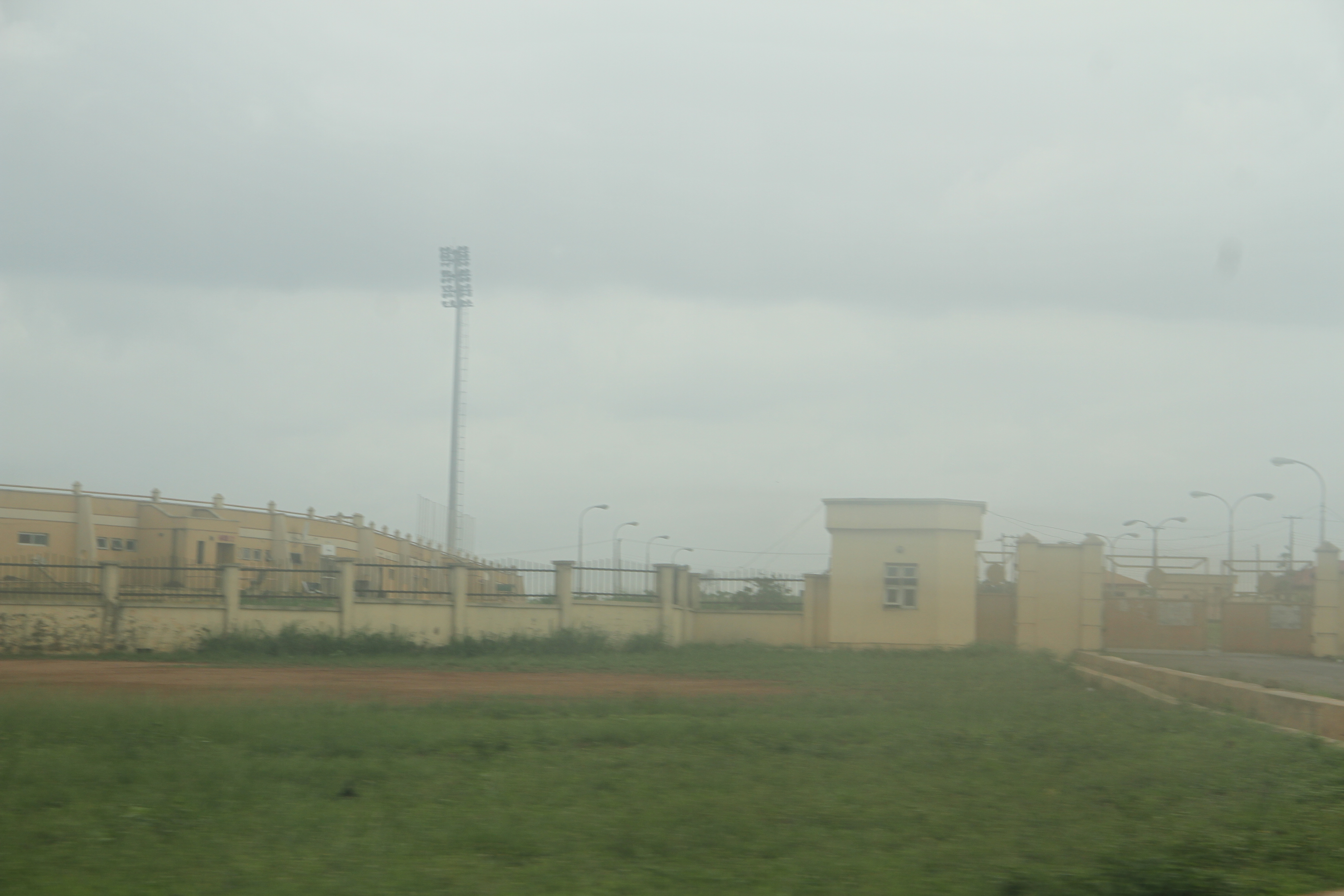
Gateway Stadium 4

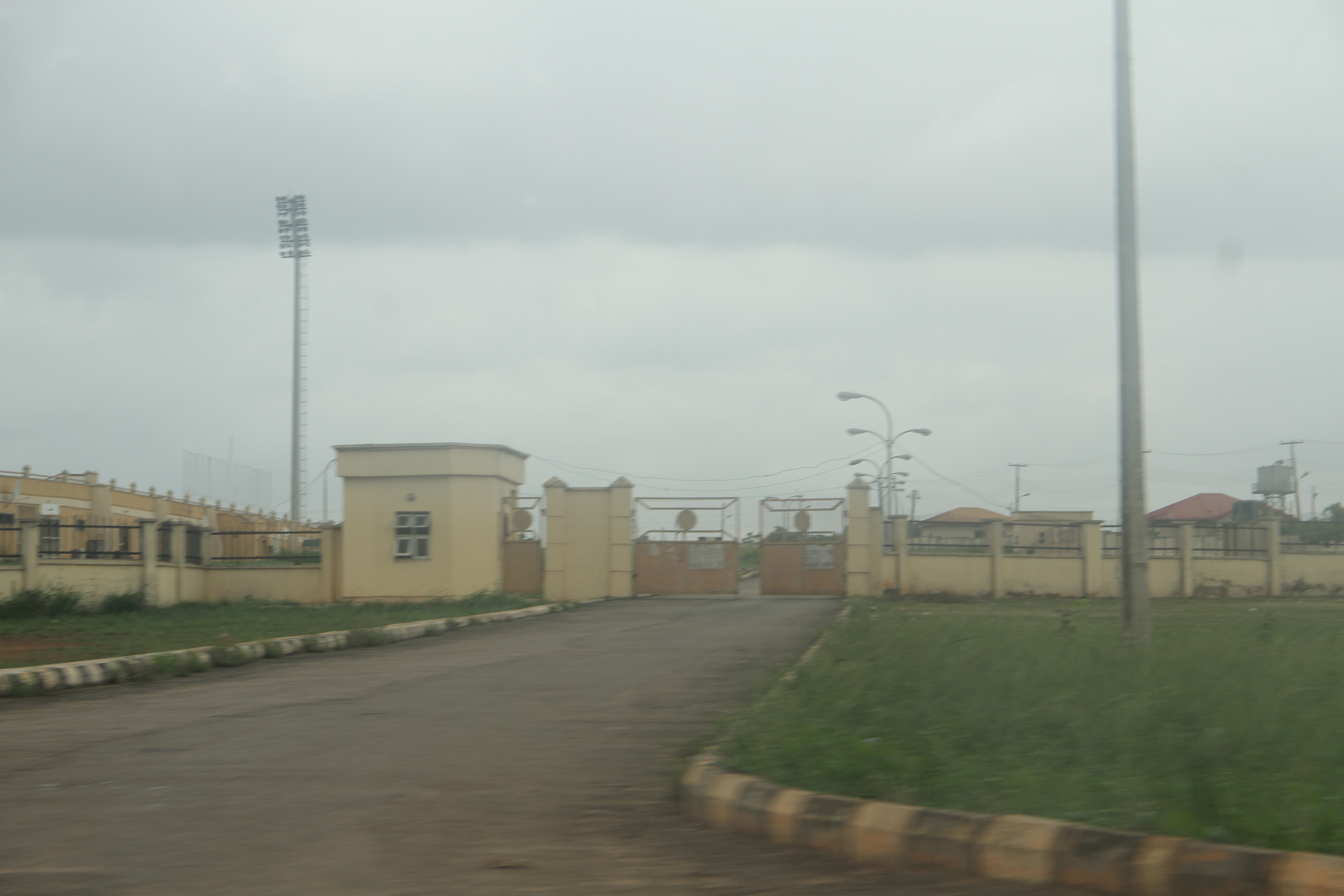
Gateway Stadium Entrance

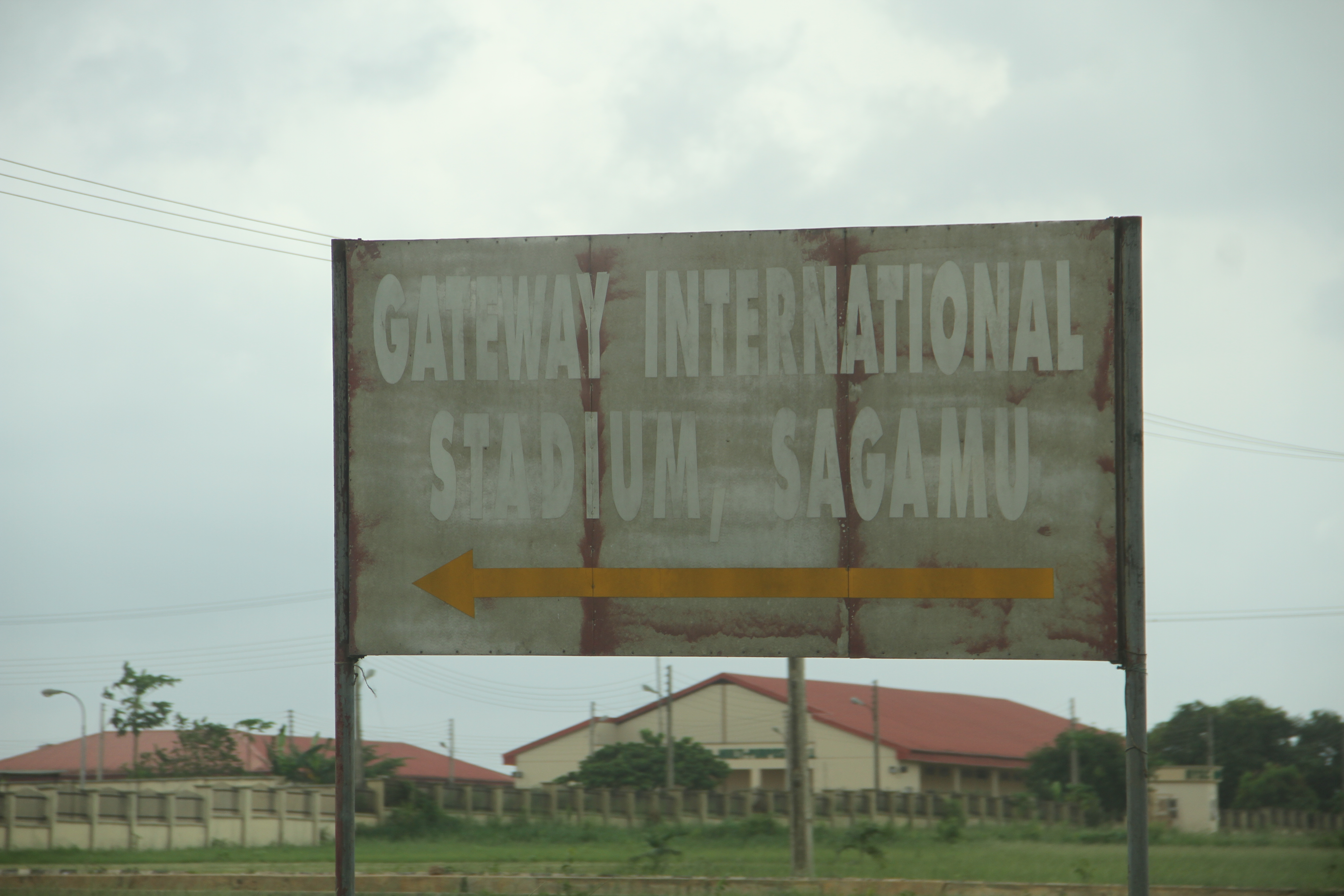
Gateway Stadium Landmark

== Notable football competitions ==
=== 1998 African Women's Championship ===
Date	Team 1	Result	Team 2	Round
18 October 1998	Ghana	4–0	South Africa	Group B
21 October 1998	Cameroon	3–2	South Africa	Group B
24 October 1998	Ghana	3–1	Cameroon	Group B
30 October 1998	DR Congo	3–3 (a.e.t.) (3–1 p)	Cameroon	Third place playoff
31 October 1998	Nigeria	2–0	Ghana	Final

=== 2009 FIFA U-17 World Cup ===
Date	Team 1	Result	Team 2	Attendance	Round
1 November 2009	United States	1–0	United Arab Emirates	13,780	Group E
4 November 2009	Argentina	2–3	Colombia	12,460	Round of 16
8 November 2009	Switzerland	2–1	Italy	13,482	Quarter-final
