= Kaduna United F.C. =

Nigerian football club

Kaduna United
- Full name: Kaduna United Football Club
- Nickname: The Crocodiles
- Founded: 2000
- Ground: Ahmadu Bello Stadium
- Capacity: 16,000
- Chairman: Muktar Baloni
- Manager: Faisal Abdullahi
- League: Nigeria Nationwide League
- 2014: Nigeria Professional Football League, 19th (relegated)
| Home colours | Away colours |

Kaduna United Football Club is a Nigerian football club based in Kaduna and run by the Kaduna State government.

== History ==
The club was relegated from the Nigerian Premier League in 2007 but won promotion just one year later. After 2011, they were no longer in the premier league and they still are not as of 2016. The government set up a new management team in 2021 that will play in the Nigeria Nationwide League, the second tier of the Nigeria Football League.

Kaduna United's home stadium is Kaduna Township Stadium.

== Achievements ==
- Nigerian FA Cup: 1

2010.

== Performance in CAF competitions ==
- CAF Confederation Cup: 1 appearance

2011 – Group stage
