= Fez Stadium =

Football stadium in Fez, Morocco

Coordinates: 34°00′10″N 4°58′08″W

Fez Sports Complex
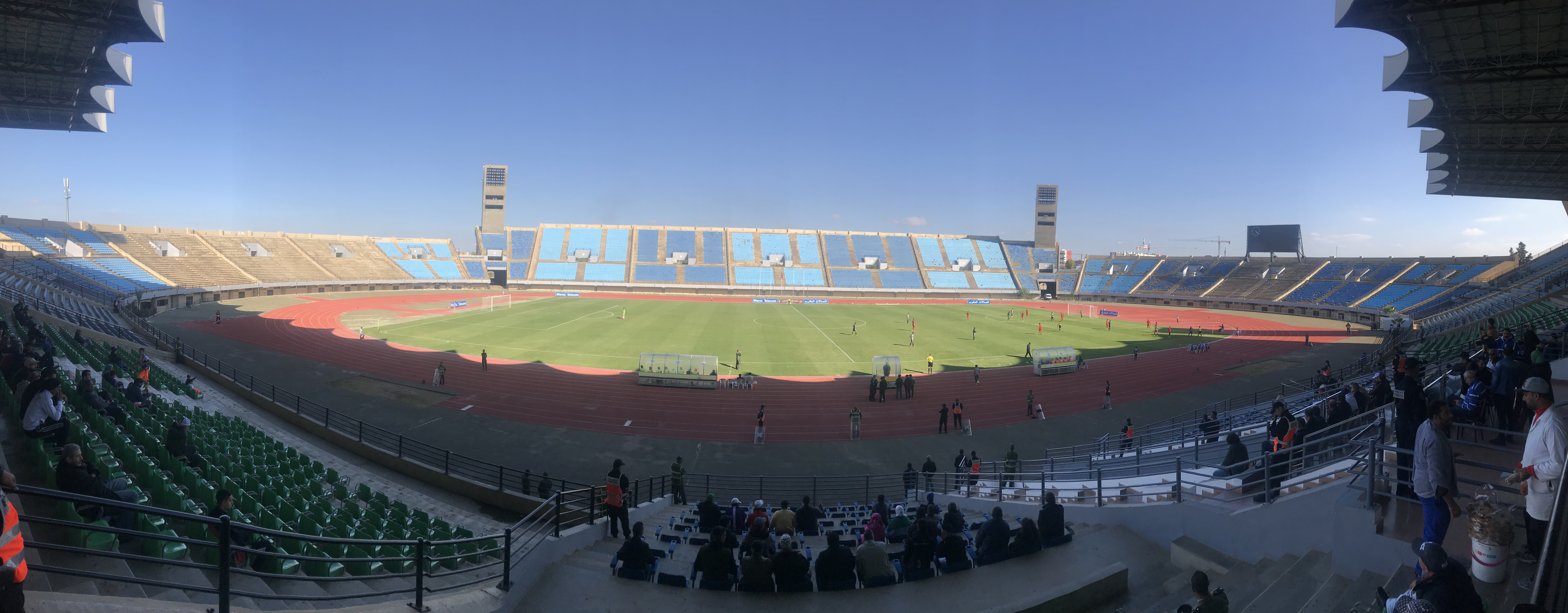
- Interactive map of Fez Sports Complex
- Location: Fez, Morocco
- Capacity: 45,000
- Surface: Grass

Construction
- Opened: 25 November 2007

Tenants
- Maghreb de Fès (2008–Present); Morocco national football team (selected matches)

The Fez Sports Complex (Arabic: المركب الرياضي بفاس) is a multi-purpose stadium in Fez, Morocco. It is used mostly for football matches and it also has athletics facilities, the stadium holds 45,000 and was built in 2003.

Fez Sports Complex is set to play a major role in Morocco's sporting ambitions, hosting matches for both the 2025 Africa Cup of Nations and the 2030 FIFA World Cup. Following recent renovations, it can currently hold about 35,468 spectators, with plans underway to expand its seating to 55,800 by 2028.

== History ==
The plans of this stadium realized by Moroccan architects and engineers and the launching of the works was done in 1992, but it is only 2 years later that it started its construction which had to be finished in 1997 to shelter with the stadium of Honor of Meknes 1997 African Youth Championship organized by Morocco. The stadium was not delivered on time, mainly because of technical problems, and it was not until 2003 that the work was completed.

The entire complex includes a media room, a first aid center, an infirmary and a doping control room, while the stadium car park at the visitors' disposal can accommodate up to 7500 cars and 350 coaches.

This stadium also entered Morocco's candidacy for the organization of the football world cup in 2006 and 2010. Thus, on this occasion the complex was completely renovated and had slight modifications with the addition of 5000 places and its total capacity was increased to 45,000 seats. But, on 15 May 2004 the organization was finally granted to South Africa by 14 votes against 10 for Morocco.

The Stade de Fès is officially inaugurated on 25 November 2007, four years after the completion of the 2006–07 Throne Cup finals with a match between FAR Rabat (D1) and Rachad Bernoussi (D2), which ended with the victory of FAR Rabat (1–1, 5 tabs to 3). The entrance was free for this meeting and 40,000 spectators from different Moroccan cities attended. The first goal scored in this stadium is a goal by Atik Chihab (FAR Rabat).

Since the inauguration of the stadium, the Maghreb de Fès has taken up residence, and played its first match in this stadium, during a league match against the Youth of El Massira match that takes place. sold out with a 0–0 draw.

The stadium's architecture blends Moroccan cultural heritage with modern design, including a glass façade and integration with surrounding green spaces.
