= 2026–27 Nigeria National League =

Nigerian football tournament

Nigeria National League
- Dates: Main round: 1 November 2026 – April 2026
- Matches: 46
- Goals: 96 (2.09 per match)
- Biggest home win: Bichi First 4–0 ABS F.C. (14 November 2026); Daurama FA 4–0 Kebbi United (14 November 2026)
- Highest scoring: Yobe Desert Stars; 3–2 Mighty Jets (7 November 2026)
- All statistics correct as of 22 November 2026.

The 2026–27 Nigeria National League (formerly the National Division 1) will be the 35th season of the Nigeria National League, the national second level in the Nigerian football league system. It will consist of 4 groups with 8 or 9 teams each.

This edition will be the final season with the format of four Conference groups system, after NNL announced that a brand new format would be introduced for the following 2027/28 edition.

== Competition format ==
- The group champions will be promoted to 2027–28 NPFL. If the champion is a reserve team, the first non-reserve team qualified will take the promotion slot.
- The champion of each group will qualify for the 2027 NNL Super 4 to determine the overall league champions.
- The last two teams in each group will be relegated to the Nigeria Nationwide League.

== Overview before the season ==
A total of 34 teams will make up the league: 4 relegated from the 2025–26 NPFL, 22 retained from the 2025–26 Nigeria National League, and 8 promoted from the NLO. Conferences group were defined on 21 August 2026.

== Teams ==
=== Team changes ===
The following teams have changed division since the 2025–26 season:

To National League
▼ Relegated from 2025/26 NPFL
- Wikki Tourists
- Bayelsa United
- El-Kanemi Warriors
- Remo Stars
▲ Promoted from 2026/27 Nationwide League
- Dokkal Khairu FC
- Neurospark FC
- ~~DMD F.C.~~
- ~~Right2Win FC~~
- ~~OYC FC~~
- Daurama FA
- Eko United
- Mighty Jets (Note: Subject to the NFF Ethic Committee Decision.)

From National League
▲ Promoted to 2026/27 NPFL
- Doma United
- Inter Lagos
- Ranchers Bees
- Sporting Lagos
▼ Relegated to 2026/27 Nationwide League
- ~~Gombe United~~ (spared)
- Sporting Supreme
- ~~Mighty Jets~~ (spared)
- City FC
- Dakkada
- ~~Abia Comets~~ (spared)
- Gateway United
- First Bank FC
- Osun United
- ~~Rovers~~ (spared)

=== Purchased statuses ===
- Rovers purchased the status from OYC FC.
- Abia Comets purchased the status from Right2Win FC.
- Akubudike FC purchased the status from Solutions FC.
- Gombe United purchased the status from DMD FC.
- Mighty Jets took over the status from Mighty Jets feeders.

=== Name changes ===
- Danburan FC was rebranded to Daurama FA

== Conference A (South) ==
=== Stadia and locations ===
Locations of the 2026–27 Conference A teams

Team	Location	Stadium	Capacity
Stormers SC	Abeokuta	MKO Abiola Stadium	10,000
Remo Stars	Ikenne	Remo Stars Stadium	5,000
Crown FC	Ogbomosho	Soun Stadium	–
Godswill Akpabio FC	Uyo	Uyo Township Stadium	5,000
Edel	Awka	Awka City Stadium	3,000
Sunshine Stars	Akure	Dipo Dina International Stadium	20,000
Heartland	Owerri	Dan Anyiam Stadium	10,000
Eko United	Lagos	Mobolaji Johnson Arena	10,000
Rovers	Calabar	U.J. Esuene Stadium	16,000

=== Standings ===
Pos	Team	Pld	W	D	L	GF	GA	GD	Pts	Qualification or relegation
1	Remo Stars	3	2	0	1	3	2	+1	6	Promotion to NPFL and qualification for Super 4 NNL
2	Sunshine Stars	3	1	1	1	3	2	+1	4	
3	Godswill Akpabio FC	2	1	1	0	2	1	+1	4	
4	Stormers SC	3	1	1	1	1	1	0	4	
5	Edel FC	3	0	3	0	1	1	0	3	
6	Rovers	3	1	0	2	2	3	−1	3	
7	Heartland	2	0	2	0	2	2	0	2	
8	Eko United	2	0	2	0	0	0	0	2	Relegation to NLO
9	Crown FC	3	0	2	1	2	4	−2	2	Relegation to NLO

Updated to match(es) played on 22 November 2026. Source: NNL
Rules for classification: 1) Points; 2) Goal difference; 3) Goals scored.

=== Results ===
Home \ Away	CRO	EDE	EKO	GOD	HEA	ROV	REM	STO	SUN
Crown FC		0–0							
Edel FC			0–0						1–1
Eko United					0–0				
Godswill Akpabio FC						2–1			
Heartland	2–2								
Rovers								1–0	
Remo Stars	2–0					1–0			
Stormers SC				0–0					1–0
Sunshine Stars							2–0		

Updated to match(es) played on 22 November 2026. Source: NNL
Legend: Blue = home team win; Yellow = draw; Red = away team win.

=== Clubs season-progress ===
Team ╲ Round	1	2	3	4	5	6	7	8	9	10	11	12	13	14	15	16	17	18
Crown FC	D	D	L															
Edel FC	D	D	D															
Eko United		D	D															
Godswill Akpabio FC	D		W															
Heartland	D	D																
Rovers	L	W	L															
Remo Stars	W	L	W															
Stormers SC	D	L	W															
Sunshine Stars	D	W	L															

First match(es) will be played on 22 November 2026. Source: NNL
W = Win; D = Draw; L = Lose

== Conference B (South) ==
=== Stadia and locations ===
Locations of the 2026–27 Conference B teams

Team	Location	Stadium	Capacity
Akwa United	Uyo	Uyo Township Stadium	5,000
Abakaliki	Abakaliki	Pa Ngele Oruta Township Stadium	
Bayelsa United	Yenagoa	Samson Siasia Stadium	5,000
Beyond Limits FC	Ikenne	Remo Stars Stadium	5,000
Ekiti United	Ekiti	Oluyemi Kayode Stadium	
Dokkal Khairu FC	Ile-Ife		
Abia Comets	Umuahia	Umuahia Township Stadium	5,000
Akubudike FC	Awka	Awka Township Stadium	3,000
Smart City	Lagos	Mobolaji Johnson Arena	10,000

=== Standings ===
Pos	Team	Pld	W	D	L	GF	GA	GD	Pts	Qualification or relegation
1	Akwa United	3	2	1	0	5	1	+4	7	Promotion to NPFL and qualification for Super 4 NNL
2	Smart City	3	2	0	1	5	3	+2	6	
3	Dokkal Khairu	3	2	0	1	4	3	+1	6	
4	Bayelsa United	3	1	1	1	2	2	0	4	
5	Ekiti United	3	1	1	1	2	4	−2	4	
6	Beyond Limits	2	1	0	1	1	1	0	3	Not eligible for promotion (Note: Ineligible for promotion as a reserve side)
7	Abakaliki FC	3	0	2	1	3	5	−2	2	
8	Akubudike FC	2	0	1	1	1	2	−1	1	Relegation to NLO
9	Abia Comets	2	0	0	2	1	3	−2	0	Relegation to NLO

Updated to match(es) played on 22 November 2026. Source: NNL
Rules for classification: 1) Points; 2) Goal difference; 3) Goals scored.

=== Results ===
Home \ Away	ABA	ABI	AKU	AKW	BAY	BEY	DOK	EKI	SMA
Abakaliki FC				1–1					
Abia Comets							1–2		
Akubudike FC	1–1								
Akwa United						1–0		3–0	
Bayelsa United		1–0						1–1	
Beyond Limits			1–0						
Dokkal Khairu FC					1–0				
Ekiti United									1–0
Smart City	3–1						2–1		

Updated to match(es) played on 22 November 2026. Source: NNL
Legend: Blue = home team win; Yellow = draw; Red = away team win.

=== Clubs season-progress ===
Team ╲ Round	1	2	3	4	5	6	7	8	9	10	11	12	13	14	15	16	17	18
Abakaliki FC	D	D	L															
Abia Comets	L		L															
Akubudike FC	D	L																
Akwa United	W	D	W															
Bayelsa United	W	L	D															
Beyond Limits		W	L															
Dokkal Khairu FC	L	W	W															
Ekiti United	L	W	D															
Smart City	W	L	W															

Updated to match(es) played on 22 November 2026. Source: NNL
W = Win; D = Draw; L = Lose

== Conference C (North) ==
=== Stadia and locations ===
Locations of the 2026–27 Conference C teams

Team	Location	Stadium	Capacity
Adamawa United	Yola	Ribadu Square Stadium	5,000
Neurospark FC	Abuja	Snake Farm Stadium	
Basira	Lafia	Lafia City Stadium	10,000
Kebbi United	Birnin Kebbi	FIFA Goal Project Pitch	267
El-Kanemi Warriors	Maiduguri	El-Kanemi Stadium	10,000
Gombe United	Gombe	Pantami Stadium	12,000
Jigawa Golden Stars	Dutse	Kazaure Stadium	
Daurama FA	Daura	Daura Township Stadium	3,000

=== Standings ===
Pos	Team	Pld	W	D	L	GF	GA	GD	Pts	Qualification or relegation
1	Neurospark FC	3	2	0	1	3	3	0	6	Promotion to NPFL and qualification for Super 4 NNL
2	Daurama FA	2	1	1	0	6	2	+4	4	
3	Jigawa Golden Stars	3	1	1	1	4	3	+1	4	
4	El-Kanemi Warriors	2	1	1	0	2	1	+1	4	
5	FC Basira	3	1	1	1	4	4	0	4	
6	Adamawa United	3	1	0	2	3	4	−1	3	
7	Kebbi United	3	1	0	2	3	7	−4	3	Relegation to NLO
8	Gombe United	3	0	2	1	3	4	−1	2	Relegation to NLO

Updated to match(es) played on 22 November 2026. Source: NNL
Rules for classification: 1) Points; 2) Goal difference; 3) Goals scored.

=== Results ===
Home \ Away	ADA	BAS	DAM	ELK	GOM	JIG	KEB	NEU
Adamawa United								2–0
FC Basira	2–0			1–1				
Daurama FA							4–0	
El-Kanemi Warriors					1–0			
Gombe United			2–2			1–1		
Jigawa Golden Stars		3–1						
Kebbi United	2–1							
Neurospark FC						1–0	2–1	

Updated to match(es) played on 22 November 2026. Source: NNL
Legend: Blue = home team win; Yellow = draw; Red = away team win.

=== Clubs season-progress ===
Team ╲ Round	1	2	3	4	5	6	7	8	9	10	11	12	13	14
Adamawa United	L	W	L											
FC Basira	W	L	D											
Daurama FA		W	D											
El-Kanemi Warriors		W	D											
Gombe United	D	L	D											
Jigawa Golden Stars	D	W	L											
Kebbi United	L	L	W											
Neurospark FC	W	L	W											

Updated to match(es) played on 22 November 2026. Source: NNL
W = Win; D = Draw; L = Lose

== Conference D (North) ==
=== Stadia and locations ===
Locations of the 2026–27 Conference D teams

Team	Location	Stadium	Capacity
ABS	Ilorin	Kwara State Stadium	18,000
Kada Warriors	Kaduna	Ahmadu Bello Stadium	16,000
Bichi First	Kano	Bichi Stadium	18,000
Sokoto United	Sokoto	Giginya Memorial Stadium	5,000
Lobi Stars	Makurdi	McCarthy Stadium	5,000
Wikki Tourists	Bauchi	Abubakar Tafawa Balewa Stadium	15,000
Yobe Desert Stars	Damaturu	Potiskum Stadium	2,000
El-Kanemi Warriors	Maiduguri	El-Kanemi Stadium	10,000

=== Standings ===
Pos	Team	Pld	W	D	L	GF	GA	GD	Pts	Qualification or relegation
1	Yobe Desert Stars	3	2	1	0	7	4	+3	7	Promotion to NPFL and qualification for Super 4 NNL
2	Kada Warriors	3	1	1	1	3	3	0	4	
2	Lobi Stars	3	1	1	1	3	3	0	4	
4	Wikki Tourists	3	1	1	1	2	3	−1	4	
5	ABS FC	3	1	1	1	3	6	−3	4	
6	Bichi First	3	1	0	2	5	3	+2	3	
7	Sokoto United	2	1	0	1	2	2	0	3	Relegation to NLO
8	Mighty Jets	2	0	1	1	3	4	−1	1	Relegation to NLO

Updated to match(es) played on 22 November 2026. Source: NNL
Rules for classification: 1) Points; 2) Goal difference; 3) Goals scored.

=== Results ===
Home \ Away	ABS	BIC	KAD	LOB	MIG	SOK	WIK	YOB
ABS FC			2–2			1–0		
Bichi First	4–0							
Kada Warriors				1–0				
Lobi Stars		1–0						2–2
Mighty Jets								
Sokoto United		2–1						
Wikki Tourists			1–0		1–1			
Yobe Desert Stars					3–2		2–0	

Updated to match(es) played on 22 November 2026. Source: NNL
Legend: Blue = home team win; Yellow = draw; Red = away team win.

=== Clubs season-progress ===
Team ╲ Round	1	2	3	4	5	6	7	8	9	10	11	12	13	14
ABS FC	W	L	D											
Bichi First	L	W	L											
Kada Warriors	L	W	D											
Lobi Stars	W	L	D											
Mighty Jets	L		D											
Sokoto United	L		W											
Wikki Tourists	W	L	D											
Yobe Desert Stars	W	W	D											

Updated to match(es) played on 22 November 2026. Source: NNL
W = Win; D = Draw; L = Lose

== See also ==
- 2026–27 Nigeria Premier Football League
- 2026–27 NWFL Premiership
