= 2025–26 Nigeria National League =

Nigerian football tournament

Nigeria National League
- Dates: Main round: 8 November 2025 – 22 April 2026; Championship round: 4 – 8 May 2026
- Champions: Sporting Lagos (1st title)
- Promoted: Doma United; Inter Lagos; Sporting Lagos; Ranchers Bees
- Relegated: Gombe United; Sporting Supreme; Mighty Jets; City FC; Dakkada; Abia Comets; Gateway United; First Bank FC; Osun United; Rovers
- Matches: 266
- Goals: 572 (2.15 per match)
- Biggest home win: Inter Lagos 5–0; Abia Comets (7 March 2026)
- Biggest away win: Stormers SC 1–5; Sporting Lagos (29 March 2026)
- Highest scoring: Stormers SC 4–2 Abakaliki (11 January 2026); Osun United 3–3; Abakaliki (20 December 2025); Stormers SC 4–2 Osun United (6 December 2025); Godswill Akpabio FC 5–1; First Bank FC (15 November 2025)
- Longest winning run: Akwa United (5 games)
- Longest unbeaten run: Doma United (6 games)
- Longest winless run: First Bank FC (8 games)
- Longest losing run: First Bank FC (4 games)

The 2025–26 Nigeria National League (formerly the National Division 1) was the 34th season of the Nigeria National League under its current title and the 17th season under its current league division format. The Nigeria National League (NNL) is the second-highest tier in the Nigerian football league system after the Nigeria Premier Football League, and is currently contested by 36 clubs.

On 8 May, Sporting Lagos were crowned league champions after finishing top of the Super 4 table.

== Team changes ==
The following teams have changed division since the 2024–25 season:

=== To National League ===
▲ Promoted from 2024/25 Nationwide League

- Ekiti United
- Stormers SC

▼ Relegated from the Nigeria Premier League

- Lobi Stars
- Sunshine Stars
- Akwa United
- Heartland

=== From National League ===
▲ Promoted to the Nigeria Premier League

- Warri Wolves
- Wikki Tourists
- Barau
- Kun Khalifat

▼ Relegated to 2025/26 Nationwide League

- Ijele
- Igbajo FC
- 1472 FC
- Madiba
- Zamfara United
- ~~Adamawa United~~ (spared)

== Teams Information ==
Conference A

Team	Location	Stadium	Capacity
Gateway United	Abeokuta	MKO Abiola Stadium	10,000
Abia Comets	Umuahia	Umuahia Township Stadium	5,000
Beyond Limits	Ikenne	Remo Stars Stadium	5,000
Crown FC	Ogbomosho	Soun Stadium	–
Dakkada	Uyo	Uyo Township Stadium	5,000
Edel	Awka	Awka City Stadium	
Sunshine Stars	Akure	Dipo Dina International Stadium	20,000 (Note: Sunshine Stars play their home games at Dipo Dina International Stadium, Ijebu-Ode rather than their regular home ground, Akure Township Stadium, Akure due to renovation works.)
Heartland	Owerri	Dan Anyiam Stadium	10,000
Inter Lagos	Lagos	Mobolaji Johnson Arena	10,000
Smart City	Lagos	Mobolaji Johnson Arena	10,000

Conference B

Team	Location	Stadium	Capacity
Abakaliki	Abakaliki	Pa Ngele Oruta Township Stadium	
First Bank FC	Lagos	Mobolaji Johnson Arena	10,000
Ekiti United	Ekiti	Oluyemi Kayode Stadium	
Godswill Akpabio FC	Uyo	Uyo Township Stadium	5,000
Akwa United	Uyo	Uyo Township Stadium	5,000
Stormers SC	Abeokuta	MKO Abiola Stadium	10,000
Osun United	Osogbo	Osogbo Township Stadium	10,000
Rovers	Calabar	U.J. Esuene Stadium	16,000
Solution FC	Awka	Awka City Stadium	3,000
Sporting Lagos	Lagos	Mobolaji Johnson Arena	10,000

Conference C

Team	Location	Stadium	Capacity
Doma United	Gombe	Pantami Stadium	12,000
City F.C.	Abuja		
Lobi Stars	Makurdi	Aper Aku Stadium	8,000 (Note: Lobi Stars play their home matches at Nnamdi Azikiwe Stadium, Enugu and previously at Lafia Township Stadium, Lafia and Abubakar Tafawa Balewa Stadium, Bauchi instead of their regular home ground Aper Aku Stadium, Makurdi due to renovation works.)
Mighty Jets	Jos	New Jos Stadium	60,000
Basira	Lafia	Lafia City Stadium	10,000
Sokoto United	Sokoto	Giginya Memorial Stadium	
Kada Warriors	Kaduna	Ahmadu Bello Stadium	16,000
ABS	Ilorin	Kwara State Stadium	18,000

Conference D

Team	Location	Stadium	Capacity
Adamawa United	Yola	Ribadu Square Stadium	5,000
Bichi First	Kano	Bichi Stadium	
Ranchers Bees	Kaduna	Ranchers Bees Stadium	10,000
Gombe United	Gombe	Pantami Stadium	12,000
Jigawa Golden Stars	Dutse	Kazaure Stadium	
Kebbi United	Birnin Kebbi	FIFA Goal Project Pitch	267
Sporting Supreme	Bwari	Bwari Stadium	
Yobe Desert Stars	Damaturu	Potiskum Stadium	2,000

== Format ==
The AGM adopted an abridged league format splitting the competition into four conferences — A, B, C and D — with the top club in each conference gaining automatic promotion to the Nigeria Premier Football League (NPFL). The Super 8 play-off was scrapped and rather a new Super 4 competition will instead be introduced at the end of the season to decide the overall NNL champion.

== Main round ==
=== South Region ===
Conference A

Pos	Team	Pld	W	D	L	GF	GA	GD	Pts	Qualification or relegation
1	Inter Lagos	16	8	5	3	26	13	+13	29	Promotion to NPFL and qualification to Championship Round
2	Beyond Limits (Note: ineligible for promotion.)	16	7	7	2	23	13	+10	28	Ineligible for promotion
3	Heartland	16	8	3	5	21	17	+4	27	
4	Smart City	16	8	3	5	21	19	+2	27	
5	Sunshine Stars	16	7	4	5	18	14	+4	25	
6	Edel FC	16	6	2	8	14	20	−6	20	
7	Crown FC	16	4	4	8	18	19	−1	16	
8	Abia Comets	16	4	3	9	16	31	−15	15	Relegation to NLO
9	Gateway United	16	3	3	10	13	24	−11	12	Relegation to NLO
10	Dakkada (Note: Dakkada withdrew after the draw due to disputes with the League Board over their conference placement after originally drawn into Conference B.)	0	0	0	0	0	0	0	0	Withdrew

Source: Soccerway
Rules for classification: 1) Points; 2) Goal difference; 3) Goals scored.
Notes:

Conference B

Pos	Team	Pld	W	D	L	GF	GA	GD	Pts	Qualification or relegation
1	Sporting Lagos	18	11	3	4	31	14	+17	36	Promotion to NPFL and Qualification for the Championship round
2	Akwa United	18	11	2	5	23	13	+10	35	
3	Ekiti United	18	10	0	8	21	17	+4	30	
4	Stormers SC	18	8	2	8	24	26	−2	26	
5	Abakaliki FC	18	7	4	7	19	17	+2	25	
6	Solutions FC	18	8	1	9	18	22	−4	25	
7	Godswill Akpabio FC	18	6	6	6	27	24	+3	24	
8	Rovers	18	7	1	10	15	21	−6	22	Relegation to NLO
9	Osun United	18	6	2	10	16	24	−8	20	Relegation to NLO
10	First Bank FC	18	4	3	11	15	31	−16	15	Relegation to NLO

Source: Soccerway
Rules for classification: 1) Points; 2) Goal difference; 3) Goals scored.

=== North Region ===
Conference C

Pos	Team	Pld	W	D	L	GF	GA	GD	Pts	Qualification or relegation
1	Doma United	14	8	2	4	18	11	+7	26	Promotion to NPFL and Qualification for the Championship round
2	Lobi Stars	14	7	2	5	12	10	+2	23	
3	FC Basira	14	6	3	5	17	14	+3	21	
4	Kada Warriors	14	5	5	4	11	9	+2	20	
5	Sokoto United	14	5	3	6	9	11	−2	18	
6	ABS FC	14	5	2	7	10	16	−6	17	
7	Mighty Jets	14	5	1	8	14	16	−2	16	Relegation to NLO
8	City FC	14	4	4	6	10	14	−4	16	Relegation to NLO

Source: Soccerway
Rules for classification: 1) Points; 2) Goal difference; 3) Goals scored.

Conference D

Pos	Team	Pld	W	D	L	GF	GA	GD	Pts	Qualification or relegation
1	Ranchers Bees	12	6	2	4	11	9	+2	20	Promotion to NPFL and Qualification for the Championship round
2	Adamawa United	12	6	0	6	12	11	+1	18	
3	Jigawa Golden Stars	12	5	3	4	12	15	−3	18	
4	Yobe Desert Stars	12	5	2	5	14	13	+1	17	
5	Kebbi United	12	5	1	6	11	11	0	16	
6	Bichi First	12	4	3	5	11	9	+2	15	
7	Gombe United	12	4	3	5	8	11	−3	15	Relegation to NLO
8	Sporting Supreme (Note: Sporting Supreme were excluded from all Nigerian national competitions by the NNL on 21st December 2025 and their record were expunged.)	0	0	0	0	0	0	0	0	Expelled, results annulled

Source: Soccerway
Rules for classification: 1) Points; 2) Goal difference; 3) Goals scored.

== Championship round ==
A championship round, known as the Super Four, involving the promoted teams from the four groups was held from 4–8 May to determine the overall league champion. All matches were played at Remo Stars Stadium in Ikenne.

Pos	Team	Pld	W	D	L	GF	GA	GD	Pts	Qualification
1	Sporting Lagos (C)	3	2	0	1	5	1	+4	6	Champions
2	Inter Lagos	3	2	0	1	3	1	+2	6	
3	Ranchers Bees	3	1	0	2	3	4	−1	3	
4	Doma United	3	1	0	2	2	7	−5	3	

(C) Champions

=== Matches ===
4 May 2026	Sporting Lagos	1–0	Ranchers Bees	Remo Stars Stadium, Ikenne
16:00 (UTC+1)	Leme Alex 40'	Report

4 May 2026	Doma United	1–0	Inter Lagos	Remo Stars Stadium, Ikenne
18:00 (UTC+1)	Yusuf Fantami 19'; Kennedy Osemudiamen (red card)	Report	Damilare Adigun (red card)

--

6 May 2026	Ranchers Bees	0–2	Inter Lagos	Remo Stars Stadium, Ikenne
18:00 (UTC+1)		Report	Quyum Akinpelu 48'; Oyedele Adebayo 71' (pen.)

6 May 2026	Sporting Lagos	4–0	Doma United	Remo Stars Stadium, Ikenne
20:00 (UTC+1)	Akanji Seun 28'; Oladunjoye Shola 48'; Solomon Uloko 81', 88'	Report

--

8 May 2026	Doma United	1–3	Ranchers Bees	Remo Stars Stadium, Ikenne
16:00 (UTC+1)	Mustapha Bashir 90'	Report	Kabiru Salisu 15', 33'; Steven Pam 87'

8 May 2026	Inter Lagos	1–0	Sporting Lagos	Remo Stars Stadium, Ikenne
16:00 (UTC+1)	Bashir Hassan 7'	Report

== Season statistics ==
=== Scoring ===
==== Top scorers ====
As of 23 February 2026

Rank	Player	Club	Goals
1	(Nigeria) Paulinus Okon	Akwa United	4
2	(Nigeria) Jamiu Sa'ad	ABS FC	3
2	(Nigeria) Eko Barine	Godswill Akpabio FC	3

== Awards ==
=== Monthly ===
Month	Manager of the Month		Most Valuable Player		Highest Goal Scorer of the Month		Best Goalkeeper of the Month		Goal of the Month		Best Behaved Team
Month	Manager	Club	Player	Club	Player	Club	Player	Club	Player	Club	
December	(Nigeria) Paul Offor	Akwa United	(Nigeria) Yaro Zakari	Yobe Desert Stars	(Nigeria) Ajibola Joel	Stormers SC	(Nigeria) Emmanuel Daniel	Ranchers Bees	(Nigeria) Daniel Gotham	Akwa United	Kada Warriors
January	(Nigeria) Paul Offor	Akwa United	(Nigeria) Victor Samuel	Sporting Lagos	(Nigeria) Tony Ayanga	Rovers	(Nigeria) Aloysius ThankGod	Akwa United	(Nigeria) Babarinde Taofeek	Gateway Fc	Rovers
February	(Nigeria) Paul Offor	Akwa United	(Nigeria) Obisesan Sodiq	Osun United	(Nigeria) Innocent Idu	City Fc	(Nigeria) Alo Chukwu Pascal	Abakaliki Fc	(Nigeria) Jafar Ojo	Smart City	Lobi Stars

== See also ==
- 2026 Nigeria Federation Cup
- 2026 Nigeria Women's Federation Cup
- 2025–26 Nigeria Premier Football League
- 2025–26 NWFL Premiership
