= 2021 Nigeria Federation Cup =

2021 AITEO Cup
Tournament details
- Country: Nigeria
- Dates: 27 June – 8 August 2021
- Teams: 37

Final positions
- Champions: Bayelsa United
- Runners-up: Nasarawa United
- CAF Confederation Cup: Bayelsa United

Tournament statistics
- Matches played: 35
- Goals scored: 77 (2.2 per match)
- All statistics correct as of 8 August 2021.

The 2021 Nigeria Federation Cup (known as the 2021 Aiteo Cup for sponsorship reasons), was the 74th edition of the Nigeria Federation Cup. The tournament started on 27 June and ended with the final on 8 August.

Kano Pillars were the defending champions from the 2019 tournament as the 2020 edition was not held due to the COVID-19 pandemic.

In a format change this year, only the 37 winners of each state competitions plus the FCT qualified rather than the winners and runners-up of each state as had been the practice in the previous editions. However, most clubs were nominated by their state FAs since they could not organize a state tournament. This was a result of their attempts to meet the CAF deadline for submission of representatives for the 2021–22 CAF Confederation Cup.

Bayelsa United won their first ever FA cup trophy on a day that marked history after defeating Nasarawa United 4–3 on penalties. They became the second club playing at the second division to win the cup after the now defunct Dolphins did that in 2001. With Bayelsa Queens having won the women's tournament, it became the first time two clubs from the same state won the men's and women's cup in the same year.

== Format ==
The competition was a single elimination knockout tournament featuring the 37 winners of each state plus the FCT. The clubs from the 10 lowest ranked states entered the 'rookie play-off', the five winners then joined the remaining 27 at the first round. All matches were played at neutral stadiums with the final held at the Samuel Ogbemudia Stadium in Benin City.

Matches were played 90 minutes with tied games going straight to penalties.

== Bracket ==
The NFF announced the bracket format on 17 June.

First round
Kano Pillars	4
Smart City FC	2
Kwara United	1(4)
Kebbi United (p)	1(5)
Warri Wolves	0(4)
Green Beret FC (p)	0(5)
Sunshine Stars (p)	1(6)
Kogi United	1(5)
Jigawa	0
Plateau	3
Bendel Insurance	1
Nasarawa	3
Katsina (p)	0(5)
El-Kanemi	0(3)
Shooting Stars	0(3)
Gombe United (p)	0(5)
Akwa United	0
Gateway	1
Wikki Tourists	1
Osun United	0
Bayelsa	1
Enugu Rangers	0
Yobe	0
Lobi Stars	1
Sokoto	1
Rivers United	2
Ekiti United	0(4)
Heartland (p)	0(5)
Zamfara	0
Abia Warriors	5
Mai Angwa	0
Niger Tornadoes	2

Second round
Kano Pillars (p)	0(3)
Kebbi United	0(2)
Green Beret FC	0(4)
Sunshine Stars (p)	0(5)
Plateau	1
Nasarawa	3
Katsina	1(4)
Gombe United (p)	1(5)
Gateway (p)	0(4)
Wikki Tourists	0(3)
Bayelsa	2
Lobi Stars	0
Rivers United	3
Heartland	1
Abia Warriors	2
Niger Tornadoes	3

Quarter-final
Kano Pillars	0
Sunshine Stars	1
Nasarawa	1
Gombe United	0
Gateway	1(4)
Bayelsa (p)	1(5)
Rivers United	1
Niger Tornadoes	0

Semi-final
Sunshine Stars	2(5)
Nasarawa (p)	2(6)
Bayelsa	1
Rivers United	0

Final
Nasarawa	2(3)
Bayelsa (p)	2(4)

== Rookie stage ==
Team 1	Score	Team 2
27 June 2021
Bendel Insurance (EDO)	w/o (Note: Bendel Insurance won on walk over after Calabar Rovers failed to show up for the match.)	Calabar Rovers (CRV)
Ngwa United (EBY)	0–2	El-Kanemi (BOR)
FC Technobat (TAR)	0–8	Shooting Stars (OYO)
Aspire FC (ANM)	1–3	Yobe Desert Stars (YBE)
29 July 2021
Bayelsa United (BAY)	1–0	NAF FC (FCT)

== First round ==
Team 1	Score	Team 2
7 July 2021
Kano Pillars (KAN)	4–2	Smart City FC (LAG)
Warri Wolves (DEL)	0–0 (4–5 p)	Green Beret FC (KAD)
Sunshine Stars (OND)	1–1 (6–5 p)	Kogi United (KOG)
Katsina (KAT)	0–0 (5–3 p)	El-Kanemi (BOR)
Akwa United (AKW)	0–1	Gateway (OGU)
Bayelsa (BAY)	1–0	Enugu Rangers (ENU)
Yobe (YBE)	0–1	Lobi Stars (BEN)
Sokoto (SOK)	1–2	Rivers United (RIV)
Ekiti United (EKT)	0–0 (4–5 p)	Heartland (IMO)
Zamfara (ZAM)	0–5	Abia Warriors (ABI)
Mai Ngwa (ADA)	0–2	Niger Tornadoes (NIG)
8 July 2021
Jigawa (JIG)	0–3	Plateau (PLA)
Bendel Insurance (EDO)	1–3	Nasarawa (NAS)
Shooting Stars (OYO)	0–0 (3–5 p)	Gombe United (GOM)
Wikki Tourists (BAU)	1–0	Osun United (OSU)
9 July 2021
Kwara United (KWA)	1–1 (4–5 p)	Kebbi United (KEB)

== Second round ==
The winners of the first round proceeds to the second round. All matches were played on 14 July.

Team 1	Score	Team 2
Kano Pillars (KAN)	0–0 (3–2 p)	Kebbi United (KEB)
Green Beret FC (KAD)	0–0 (4–5 p)	Sunshine Stars (OND)
Plateau (PLA)	1–3	Nasarawa (NAS)
Katsina (KAT)	1–1 (4–5 p)	Gombe United (GOM)
Gateway (OGU)	0–0 (4–3 p)	Wikki Tourists (BAU)
Bayelsa (BAY)	2–0	Lobi Stars (BEN)
Rivers United (RIV)	3–1	Heartland (IMO)
Abia Warriors (ABI)	2–3	Niger Tornadoes (NIG)

== Quarter-final ==
The eight winners from the second round were pitted against each other. All matches were played on 22 July.

Kano Pillars the defending champion were eliminated at this round by Sunshine Stars.

Team 1	Score	Team 2
Kano Pillars (KAN)	0–1	Sunshine Stars (OND)
Nasarawa (NAS)	1–0	Gombe United (GOM)
Gateway (OGU)	1–1 (4–5 p)	Bayelsa (BAY)
Rivers United (RIV)	1–0	Niger Tornadoes (NIG)

22 July	Kano Pillars	0–1	Sunshine Stars	Confluence Stadium, Lokoja
15:00		Report	Yusuf 48'

22 July	Nasarawa	1–0	Gombe United	New Jos Stadium, Jos
15:00	Nwankwo 45'

22 July	Gateway	1–1 (4–5 p)	Bayelsa	Kwara State Stadium, Ilorin
15:00	Emo 50'	Report	Ikechukwu 58'

22 July	Rivers United	1–0	Niger Tornadoes	FIFA Goal Project Pitch, Abuja
15:00	Omoniwari 90+2'	Report

== Semi-final ==
The semi-finals were both held on 30 July at two different venues. Bayelsa United defeated Rivers United to reach their first ever Aiteo Cup final in the club's history. This was also the first time two clubs from Bayelsa would be playing at the Aiteo Cup finals, with Bayelsa Queens having qualified for the women's cup final.

Team 1	Score	Team 2
Sunshine Stars (OND)	2–2 (5–6 p)	Nasarawa (NAS)
Bayelsa (BAY)	1–0	Rivers United (RIV)

30 July	Sunshine Stars	2–2 (5–6 p)	Nasarawa	Delta State Polytechnic Stadium, Ozoro
15:00	Nwankwo 32' (pen.); Ohanachom 64'	Report	Ekelojuoti 51'; Adeniji 90+4'	Referee: Ferdinand Udoh

30 July	Bayelsa	1–0	Rivers United	Agege Stadium, Lagos
15:00	Inikurogha 68'	Report		Referee: Bashir Salihu

== Final ==
The final was played after the women's cup final at the Samuel Ogbemudia Stadium in Benin City.

Bayelsa United won their maiden cup trophy and earned the right to participate at the CAF Confederation Cup. Nasarawa United loss was their second FA cup loss on penalties after losing to Ifeanyiubah at the 2016 edition.

Team 1	Score	Team 2
Nasarawa (NAS)	2–2 (3–4 p)	Bayelsa (BAY)

8 August	Nasarawa	2–2 (3–4 p)	Bayelsa	Samuel Ogbemudia Stadium, Benin City
18:00	Ohanachom 20'; Abdullahi 26'	Report	Inikurogha 19'; 35'	Referee: Patience Ndidi Madu

2021 Aiteo Cup winners

1st title

== Awards ==
Award	Winner
Top scorer	(Nigeria) Gafaar Olafimihan (3SC)
Most Valuable Player	(Nigeria) Mohammed Galadima (Nasarawa)
