= 2025 Nigeria Federation Cup =

77th edition of the Nigeria FA Cup

2025 Federation Cup
President Federation Cup

Tournament details
- Country: Nigeria
- Dates: 5 March – 28 June
- Teams: 74

Final positions
- Champions: Kwara United (1st title)
- CAF Confederation Cup: Kwara United

Tournament statistics
- Matches played: 70
- Goals scored: 182 (2.6 per match)

The 2025 Nigeria Federation Cup was the 77th edition of the Nigeria Federation Cup, the nation's oldest knockout football tournament. The tournament began with the National playoffs on 5 March. Kwara United won their maiden cup title in their 28 years of existence after defeating Abakaliki in the final.

The format remains the same with 74 clubs qualifying as finalists in the tournaments held across the different states of Nigeria and the FCT.

== Format ==
The competition is a single elimination knockout tournament featuring the 36 finalists of each state tournaments plus the FCT. The 20 weakest clubs entered the national play-off round, whereafter the winners joined the remaining 54 teams at the main tournament. All matches are played at neutral stadiums.

Matches are played 90 minutes with tied games going straight to penalties.

== State tournament finals ==
State	Winner	Score	Runners-up
Abia	Ahudiyannem	0–0 (3–1 p)	Enyimba
Adamawa	Adamawa United	1–1 (4–2 p)	Velvot
Akwa-Ibom	Akwa United	1–0	Eagle Eye FA
Anambra	Edel	0–0 (2–0 p)	Solution FC
Bauchi	Wikki Tourists	1–0	Warinje
Bayelsa	Crusaders FC	2–2 (4–2 p)	Bayelsa United
Benue	Lobi Stars	2–1	Flight FC
Borno	El-Kanemi Warriors	3–0	CP Strikers
Cross River	Calabar Rovers	1–0	E-World FC
Delta	Warri Wolves	2–1	De Sapele Lions
Ebonyi	Abakaliki	1–0	Cynosure
Edo	Bendel Insurance	3–0	Assemblies of God
Ekiti	NOSMAS FC	1–0	COPDEM
Enugu	Enugu Rangers	3–0	Ijele
Gombe	Gombe United	3–1	El-Shama
Imo	Heartland	2–0	OISA FC
Jigawa	Dandidi Babes	2–0	Lautai United
Kaduna	Green Berets	1–1 (4–2 p)	Simon Ben FA
Kano	Kano Pillars	3–2	Barau
Katsina	Katsina United	1–0	Junior Danburan
Kebbi	Kebbi United	5–1	Discovery Talent Academy
Kogi	FC Bako	2–1	Kogi Central
Kwara	Kwara United	1–1 (5–4 p)	ABS
Lagos	Inter Lagos	0–0 (5–4 p)	Ikorodu City
Nasarawa	Nasarawa United	2–0	Basira FC
Niger	Atlantic FA	0–0 (6–5 p)	Harmony FA
Ogun	Imperial FC	2–2 (8–7 p)	Beyond Limits
Ondo	Sunshine Stars	0–0 (4–3 p)	Sunshine Stars U19
Osun	Igbajo	1–0	Osun United
Oyo	Shooting Stars	0–0 (4–2 p)	Crown FC
Plateau	Plateau United	2–0	Mighty Jets Feeders
Rivers	Rivers United	0–0 (4–3 p)	Wilbros
Sokoto	Sokoto North	2–1	Sokoto United
Taraba	Eagle Stars FC	1–0	Technobat
Yobe	Yobe Desert Stars	10–1	Gujuba Academy
Zamfara	Zamfara United	1–0	Zamfara United Feeders
FCT	FWC FC	0–0 (4–3 p)	EFCC FC

== National play-offs ==
All matches were played on 5 March.

Team 1	Score	Team 2
Ahudiyannem	2–1	OISA FC
Eagle Eye FA	0–1	E-World FC
De Sapele Lions	1–1 (3–5 p)	Assemblies of God
El-Shama	3–0	Velvot
Technobat	1–2	Flight FC
Gujuba Academy	1–2	CP Strikers
Kogi Central	2–4	Harmony FA
Sunshine Stars U19	3–0	COPDEM
Simon Ben FA	2–0	Zamfara United
Discovery Talent Academy	2–1	Sokoto North

== Round of 64 ==
The draw for this round was conducted on 12 March. Matches were held between 18 and 20 March.

Team 1	Score	Team 2
18 March 2025
Enugu Rangers	1–0	Kano Pillars
Solution FC	2–0	Eagles Stars FC
Gombe United	3–0	Assemblies of God
19 March 2025
Shooting Stars	3–0	Zamfara United
Sunshine Stars	2–0	FC Bako
Lobi Stars	2–0	Discovery Talent Academy
Wikki Tourists	1–0	Edel
Enyimba	5–0	El-Shama
Bayelsa United	w/o	EFCC FC
Warri Wolves	2–0	Wilbros
Heartland	2–0	CP Strikers
Osun United	2–1	FWC FC
Plateau United	2–1	Ahudiyannem
Sokoto United	0–1	Junior Danburan
Kwara United	2–0	Cynosure
Basira FC	5–0	Atlantic FA
Calabar Rovers	4–1	Igbajo
Ikorodu City	1–1 (4–3 p)	Sunshine Stars U19
Crown FC	7–1	NOSMAS FC
Beyond Limits	4–1	Crusaders FC
Rivers United	2–1	Barau
El-Kanemi Warriors	3–2	Simon Ben FA
Katsina United	1–0	Green Berets
Nasarawa United	2–0	Flight FC
Adamawa United	1–1 (4–3 p)	Warinje
Bendel Insurance	5–0	Dandidi Babes
ABS	1–2	E-World
Akwa United	2–1	Kebbi United
Inter Lagos	5–0	Harmony FA
20 March 2025
Ijele	8–1	Lautai United
Yobe Desert Stars	1–2	Abakaliki
Mighty Jets Feeders	0–0 (5–4 p)	Imperial FC

== Round of 32 ==
Matches were played on 2 and 3 April.

Team 1	Score	Team 2
2 April 2025
Kwara United	1–0	Gombe United
Nasarawa United	5–0	Ijele
Wikki Tourists	1–0	Calabar Rovers
Mighty Jets	0–2	Akwa United
Osun United	1–1 (4–2 p)	E-World
Beyond Limits	2–1	Rivers United
Abakiliki	0–0 (3–2 p)	Katsina United
Bayelsa United	2–0	Basira
Bendel Insurance	3–0	Adamawa United
El-Kanemi Warriors	0–1	Enyimba
Heartland	1–1	Enugu Rangers
Ikorodu City	3–1	Crown
Lobi Stars	1–2	Solution FC
Sunshine Stars	0–1	Plateau United
Warri Wolves	w/o	Shooting Stars
3 April 2025
Inter Lagos	w/o	Junior Danburan

== Round of 16 ==
All matches were played on 16 April.

Team 1	Score	Team 2
Nasarawa United	1–1 (5–3 p)	Bayelsa United
Solution FC	0–3	Kwara United
Plateau United	2–1	Osun United
Warri Wolves	1–1 (3–4 p)	Wikki Tourists
Ikorodu City	2–0	Beyond Limits
Akwa United	1–0	Inter Lagos
Bendel Insurance	0–1	Enugu Rangers
Enyimba	0–2	Abakiliki

16 April 2025	Nasarawa United	1–1 (5–3 p)	Bayelsa United	PAAU Stadium, Anyigba
10:00 (UTC+1)	Yusuf 49'		Yahaya 61'
	Penalties
	Kabiru (penalty scored); Utaka (penalty scored); Ulunwa (penalty scored); Jack (penalty scored); Manga (penalty scored)		Penalty scored Penalty missed

16 April 2025	Solution FC	0–3	Kwara United	Samuel Ogbemudia Stadium, Benin City
10:00 (UTC+1)			Aimufua 28'; Kabiru 45+2'; Gata 53'

16 April 2025	Plateau United	2–1	Osun United	PAAU Stadium, Anyigba
13:00 (UTC+1)	Pam 31'; Itodo 90+6'		44'

16 April 2025	Warri Wolves	1–1 (3–4 p)	Wikki Tourists	Area 3 Stadium, Abuja
13:00 (UTC+1)	7' (red card)		Taiwo 90+5'
	Penalties
	Penalty scored Penalty missed		Penalty scored Penalty missed

16 April 2025	Ikorodu City	2–0	Beyond Limits	Samuel Ogbemudia Stadium, Benin City
13:30 (UTC+1)	Uzondu 53'; Adelani 60'

16 April 2025	Akwa United	1–0	Inter Lagos	Area 3 Stadium, Abuja
16:00 (UTC+1)	Orji 71'

16 April 2025	Bendel Insurance	0–1	Enugu Rangers	Onikan Stadium, Lagos
16:00 (UTC+1)			Obaje 45+5' (pen.)

16 April 2025	Enyimba	0–2	Abakaliki	Stephen Keshi Stadium, Asaba
16:00 (UTC+1)			Chukwudi 45'; Eni 65'

== Quarter-final ==
All matches were played on 3 May.

Team 1	Score	Team 2
Abakaliki	1–1 (5–4 p)	Nasarawa United
Akwa United	2–2 (4–5 p)	Kwara United
Plateau United	0–1	Enugu Rangers
Wikki Tourists	0–1	Ikorodu City

3 May 2025	Abakaliki	1–1 (5–4 p)	Nasarawa United	Samuel Ogbemudia Stadium, Benin City
16:00 (UTC+1)	Ifeanyi 50' (pen.)		Garba 43'

3 May 2025	Akwa United	2–2 (4–5 p)	Kwara United	Nnamdi Azikiwe Stadium, Enugu
16:00 (UTC+1)	Ebedebiri 15'; Ini 24'		Alalade 35', 45+2'
	Penalties
	Penalty scored Penalty missed		Penalty scored

3 May 2025	Plateau United	0–1	Enugu Rangers	Area 3 Stadium , Abuja
16:00 (UTC+1)			Okorie 29'

3 May 2025	Wikki Tourists	0–1	Ikorodu City	Bwari Township Stadium, Bwari
16:00 (UTC+1)	Musa (red card)		Adelani 54' (red card)

== Semi-final ==
Both matches were played on 21 May.

Team 1	Score	Team 2
Abakaliki	0–0 (5–4 p)	Ikorodu City
Kwara United	1–0	Enugu Rangers

21 May 2025	Abakaliki	0–0 (5–4 p)	Ikorodu City	Bwari Township Stadium, Bwari
16:00 (UTC+1)
	Penalties
	(penalty scored); Christopher (penalty missed); Ugwu (penalty scored); Uche (penalty scored); Aleke (penalty scored); Paschal (penalty scored)		Oyedokun (penalty scored); Cole (penalty scored); Onwe (penalty missed); Ayemwenre (penalty scored); Uzondu (penalty scored); Freedom (penalty missed)

21 May 2025	Kwara United	1–0	Enugu Rangers	Onikan Stadium, Lagos
17:00 (UTC+1)	Alalade 51'

== Final ==
This marked the first cup final appearance for both teams and the first final appearance for a team from Ebonyi. It was played on 28 June 2025.

Team 1	Score	Team 2
Abakaliki	0–0 (3–4 p)	Kwara United

28 June 2025	Abakaliki	0–0 (3–4 p)	Kwara United	Onikan Stadium, Lagos
16:00 (UTC+1)	Chimsom (yellow card); Uche (yellow card)	Report		Referee: Joseph Ogabor
	Penalties
	Ezera (penalty scored); Oma (penalty scored); Ugwu (penalty missed); Amarachi (penalty missed); Aleke (penalty scored)		Akanni (penalty missed); Abayomi (penalty scored); Jimoh (penalty scored) (penalty scored) (penalty scored)
