= 2019 Nigeria Federation Cup =

2019 AITEO Cup
Tournament details
- Country: Nigeria
- Dates: 3 May – 28 July 2019
- Teams: 74 (all); 64 (main competition)

Final positions
- Champions: Kano Pillars (1st title)
- Runners-up: Niger Tornadoes
- CAF Confederation Cup: Niger Tornadoes (Note: Niger Tornadoes qualified as runners-up since Kano Pillars had qualified for the CAF Champions League.)

Tournament statistics
- Matches played: 73
- Goals scored: 187 (2.56 per match)

The 2019 Nigeria Federation Cup (officially known as the 2019 AITEO Cup for sponsorship reasons) was the 73rd edition of the Nigerian Federation Cup. It was held from 3 May till 28 July 2019. The competition was contested by 74 teams, all which qualified via their state championships.

Kano Pillars defeated Niger Tornadoes 4–3 on penalties after the match ended goalless to win their second AITEO Cup title since 1953. As runners-up, Niger Tornadoes qualified for the 2019–20 CAF Confederation Cup since Kano Pillars had qualified for the 2019–20 CAF Champions League.

== Format ==
The competition was a single elimination knockout tournament, 74 teams qualified via their state championships as winners or runners-up. 54 teams qualified directly to the First Round while the 10 winners from the Rookie stages joined them. All matches were held on neutral venues.

== Schedule ==
The schedule of the competition was as follows.

| Stage | Dates |
|---|---|
| Rookie stage | 3 May 2019 |
| First round | 25 May – 16 June 2019 |
| Second round | 19 & 20 June 2019 |
| Third round | 23 & 24 June 2019 |
| Quarter-finals | 28 June 2019 |
| Semi-finals | 4 July 2019 |
| Final | 28 July 2019 at Ahmadu Bello Stadium, Kaduna |

== Rookie play-offs ==
Matches were played on 3 May 2019.

Club's states in brackets.

| Team 1 | Score | Team 2 |
|---|---|---|
| Suleiman Boys (Jigawa) | 0–8 | Layin Zomo (Kaduna) |
| Gwandu (Kebbi) | 5–2 | Eaglets (Zamfara) |
| Setraco FC(FCT) | 1–1 (3–2 p) | J.M Liberty (Benue) |
| Mai Anguwa (Adamawa) | 0–1 | Qatar Academy (Borno) |
| FC Lokoja (Kogi) | 0–3 | Niger Tornadoes Feeders (Niger) |
| FC Starplus (Enugu) | 0–0 (3–4 p) | Heartland Comets (Imo) |
| Ben Ayade FC (Cross River) | 0–0 (4–1 p) | Confine FC (Akwa Ibom) |
| J.K.F FC (Ekiti) | 0–0 (3–4 p) | Police FC (Osun) |
| FC De Leo (Edo) | 2–0 | Abaye FC (Bayelsa) |
| Airtel FC (Taraba) | 0–1 | Yobe Desert Stars Feeders (Yobe) |

== First round ==
The 10 winners from the Rookie round joined the 54 teams already qualified for the main tournament. Matches were played between 25 May 2019 and 16 June 2019.

Club's states in brackets.

| Team 1 | Score | Team 2 |
|---|---|---|
25 May 2019
| Yobe Desert Stars Feeders (Yobe) | 0–1 | Smart City F.C. (Lagos) |
| Osun United (Osun) | 0–1 | Shooting Stars (Oyo) |
| Ekiti United (Ekiti) | 4–0 | Ebonyi United (Ebonyi) |
| FC De Leo (Edo) | 1–1 (4–5 p) | EFCC FC (FCT) |
| Crown F.C. (Oyo) | 3–0 | Bayelsa United (Bayelsa) |
| Amanda FC (Imo) | 1–2 | Calabar Rovers (Cross River) |
| Adamawa United (Adamawa) | 0–7 | ABS FC (Kwara) |
26 May 2019
| Gateway United (Ogun) | 1–0 | Almar FC(Ogun) |
| Cynosure FC (Ebonyi) | 2–2 (5–3 p) | Mighty Jets F.C. (Plateau) |
| Aklosendi (Nasarawa) | 3–1 | Zabgai (Bauchi) |
27 May 2019
| Spartans FC (Lagos) | 0–1 | PH City F.C. (Rivers) |
28 May 2019
| Warri Wolves (Delta) | 2–0 | Doma United FC (Gombe) |
| Kogi United (Kogi) | 3–3 (0–3 p) | Akure City (Ondo) (Note: Kogi United qualified to the next round in place of Akure City, as they couldn't honour their next fixture due to financial reasons.) |
12 June 2019
| Kwara United (Kwara) | w/o | Ben Ayade FC (Cross River) |
15 June 2019
| Wikki Tourists (Bauchi) | 4–0 | Qatar Academy (Borno) |
| Walli Flamingoes (Zamfara) | 0–4 | Delta Force FC (Delta) |
| Sokoto United (Sokoto) | 1–2 | Akwa United (Akwa Ibom) |
| Setraco United (FCT) | 0–4 | Plateau United (Plateau) |
| Rivers United (Rivers) | 4–0 | Timber Loader FC (Taraba) |
| Niger Tornadoes (Niger) | 3–0 | Fasbir (Sokoto) |
| Kebbi United (Kebbi) | 0–1 | Lobi Stars (Benue) |
| Jigawa Golden Stars (Jigawa) | 1–2 | Bendel Insurance (Edo) |
| Gwandu (Kebbi) | 2–4 | Katsina United (Katsina) |
| Gombe United (Gombe) | w/o | Ifeanyi Ubah FC (Anambra) |
| Enugu Rangers (Enugu) | 2–0 | Niger Tornadoes Feeders (Niger) |
| Abia Warriors (Abia) | 1–0 | Heartland Comets (Imo) |
16 June 2019
| Police FC (Osun | 0–6 | El-Kanemi Warriors (Borno) |
| Layin Zomo (Kaduna) | 1–2 | Sunshine Stars (Ondo) |
| Katsina United Feeders (Katsina) | 0–1 | Nasarawa United (Nasarawa) |
| Enyimba (Abia) | 3–1 | Kano Pillars Feeders (Kano) |
| Aspire FC (Anambra) | 0–4 | Kano Pillars (Kano) |
| Ambassadors FC Zaria (Kaduna) | 1–0 | Yobe Desert Stars (Yobe) |

== Second round ==
The 32 winners from the First round competed at this round. Matches were played on 19 and 20 June 2019.

Club's states in brackets.

| Team 1 | Score | Team 2 |
|---|---|---|
19 June 2019
| Smart City FC (Lagos) | 3–2 | Enyimba (Abia) |
| Rivers United (Rivers) | 3–0 | Akwa United (Akwa Ibom) |
| PH City FC (Rivers) | w/o | El-Kanemi Warriors (Borno) |
| Katsina United (Katsina) | 0–2 | Shooting Stars (Oyo) |
| Gombe United (Gombe) | 0–1 | Niger Tornadoes (Niger) |
| Gateway United (Ogun) | 0–2 | Abia Warriors (Abia) |
| Enugu Rangers (Enugu) | 0–2 | Lobi Stars (Benue) |
| Ekiti United (Ekiti) | 2–4 | Bendel Insurance (Edo) |
| EFCC FC (FCT) | 1–0 | Sunshine Stars (Ondo) |
| Delta Force (Delta) | 0–0 (10–11 p) | Cynosure FC (Ebonyi) |
| Crown F.C. (Oyo) | 1–1 (2–3 p) | Kwara United (Kwara) |
| Calabar Rovers (Cross River) | 1–1 (4–2 p) | Wikki Tourists (Bauchi) |
| Ambassadors FC Zaria (Kaduna) | 0–1 | Warri Wolves (Delta) |
| Aklosendi (Nasarawa) | 1–0 | Nasarawa United (Nasarawa) |
20 June 2019
| Kogi United (Kogi) | 0–3 | Plateau United (Plateau) |
| ABS FC (Kwara) | 0–1 | Kano Pillars (Kano) |

== Third round ==
Sixteen teams participated in this round. Matches were played on 23 and 24 June 2019.

Club's states in brackets.

| Team 1 | Score | Team 2 |
|---|---|---|
23 June 2019
| Smart City FC (Lagos) | 0–0 (5–4 p) | Shooting Stars FC (Oyo) |
| Rivers United (Rivers) | 2–0 | Warri Wolves (Delta) |
| Lobi Stars (Benue) | 3–1 | Abia Warriors (Abia) |
| Cynosure FC (Ebonyi) | 2–2 (4–5 p) | Niger Tornadoes (Niger) |
| Bendel Insurance (Edo) | 1–1 (5–4 p) | El-Kanemi Warriors (Borno) |
24 June 2019
| Plateau United (Plateau) | 0–0 (4–5 p) | Calabar Rovers (Cross River) |
| Kano Pillars (Kano) | 0–0 (4–2 p) | Kwara United (Kwara) |
| EFCC FC (FCT) | 0–1 | Aklosendi (Nasarawa) |

| 23 June 2019 | Smart City FC | 0–0 (5–4 p) | Shooting Stars FC | Ijebu-Ode Stadium, Ijebu-Ode |
| 17:00 (UTC+1) |

| 23 June 2019 | Rivers United | 2–0 | Warri Wolves | Yenagoa Township Stadium, Yenagoa |
| 16:00 (UTC+1) | Martins 14'; Adedipe 65' |

| 23 June 2019 | Lobi Stars | 3–1 | Abia Warriors | Akure Township Stadium, Akure |
| 16:00 (UTC+1) | Mbah 26' (pen.); Aghahowa | | Obi 6' |

| 23 June 2019 | Cynosure FC | 2–2 (4–5 p) | Niger Tornadoes | Aper Aku Stadium, Makurdi |
| 17:00 (UTC+1) | Goal | | Yusuf 55'; Saib 75' |

| 23 June 2019 | Bendel Insurance | 1–1 (5–4 p) | El-Kanemi Warriors | Rwang Pam Stadium, Jos |
| 17:00 | 44' (pen.) | | Eze 70' (red card) 90' |

| 24 June 2019 | Plateau United | 0–0 (4–5 p) | Calabar Rovers |
| 17:00 (UTC+1) |

| 24 June 2019 | Kano Pillars | 0–0 (4–2 p) | Kwara United | FIFA Goal Project Stadium, Abuja |
| 17:00 (UTC+1) | | | Akinmoladun (red card) 52' |

| 24 June 2019 | EFCC FC | 0–1 | Aklosendi | Confluence Stadium, Lokoja |
| 17:00 (UTC+1) | | | Ambina 7' |

== Quarter-finals ==
Matches were played on 28 June 2019.

Club's states in brackets.

| Team 1 | Score | Team 2 |
|---|---|---|
| Niger Tornadoes (Niger) | 0–0 (5–4 p) | Smart City FC (Lagos) |
| Lobi Stars (Benue) | 0–0 (3–4 p) | Rivers United (Rivers) |
| Kano Pillars | 4–0 | Aklosendi (Nasarawa) |
| Bendel Insurance (Edo) | 0–0 (4–5 p) | Calabar Rovers (Cross River) |

| 28 June 2019 | Niger Tornadoes | 0–0 (5–4 p) | Smart City FC | Ilorin Township Stadium, Ilorin |
| 16:00 (UTC+1) |

| 28 June 2019 | Lobi Stars | 0–0 (3–4 p) | Rivers United | Ijebu-Ode Stadium, Ijebu-Ode |
| 16:00 (UTC+1) |

| 28 June 2019 | Kano Pillars | 4–0 | Aklosendi | Ahmadu Bello Stadium, Kaduna |
| 16:00 (UTC+1) | Adamu 17', 36'; Usman 44' (o.g.); Salisu 54' |

| 28 June 2019 | Bendel Insurance | 0–0 (4–5 p) | Calabar Rovers | Nnamdi Azikiwe Stadium, Enugu |
| 16:00 (UTC+1) |

== Semi-finals ==
Matches were played on 4 July 2019.

Club's states in brackets.

| Team 1 | Score | Team 2 |
|---|---|---|
| Rivers United (Rivers) | 1–2 | Niger Tornadoes (Niger) |
| Calabar Rovers (Cross River) | 1–1 (2–4 p)} | Kano Pillars (Kano) |

| 4 July 2019 | Rivers United | 1–2 | Niger Tornadoes | Agege Stadium, Lagos |
| 16:00 | Adedipe 16' | | Asamoah-Frimpong 10'; Saib 44' |

| 4 July 2019 | Calabar Rovers | 1–1 (2–4 p) | Kano Pillars | Aper Aku Stadium, Makurdi |
| 16:00 | Goal | | Goal |

== Final ==
The final was held on 28 July 2019 at the Ahmadu Bello Stadium in Kaduna after it was moved from the original date 24 July 2019.

Club's states in brackets.

| Team 1 | Score | Team 2 |
|---|---|---|
| Kano Pillars (Kano) | 0–0 (4–3 p) | Niger Tornadoes (Niger) |

| 28 July 2019 | Kano Pillars | 0–0 (4–3 p) | Niger Tornadoes | Ahmadu Bello Stadium, Kaduna |
| 17:00 (UTC+1) | | Report |

2019 Aiteo Cup winners

1st title
