= 2013–14 Stationery Stores season =

Nigerian football club season

The 2014 Stationery Stores F.C. season was the first season for Stationery Stores F.C. in the Nigerian National League (and at any level in Nigerian football) since 2004, when the club couldn't complete their fixtures due to lack of finances and in-fighting amongst the Adebajo family that owned the club. In February 2014, it was announced Stores would buy Union Bank F.C.'s slot in the National League a ten-year exile. They finished at the bottom of the table with 8 wins, 7 draws and 15 losses, confirming relegation to the Nigeria Nationwide League.

== Current squad ==
Note: Flags indicate national team as defined under FIFA eligibility rules; some limited exceptions apply. Players may hold more than one non-FIFA nationality.

No.	Pos.	Nation	Player
2		NGR	Adeniregun Quadri
3		NGR	Thomas Okanlawon
7	DF	NGR	Festus Ajah
8	FW	NGR	Onyekwelu Chibuzor
9	FW	NGR	Chigozie Mbonu
10	MF	NGR	Chinonso Nwawu
11		NGR	S.D. Ramon
12		NGR	Ajabor Ihedu
13		NGR	Akeem Hossen
14		NGR	Tinat Gideon
15		NGR	Ayo Filani(capt.)
—		NGR	Olatunde Nurudeen

No.	Pos.	Nation	Player
16		NGR	Richard Harrison
17	FW	NGR	Onwirebe Rapheal
18	DF	NGR	Jimoh Olawale
22		NGR	Jimoh Lucky
23		NGR	Falolu Adeola
24		NGR	Ukatu Kingsley
25	GK	NGR	Oghenovo Uzeze
28	FW	NGR	Jejelola Olaniyi
30		NGR	Musa Sadiq
33	GK	NGR	Ogunloye Adeniyi
35		NGR	Wale Amusan
—	FW	NGR	Fuad Ekelejuoti

Team Manager: Yomi Peters

Head Coach: Fatai Amoo

Asst. Coaches: Taiwo Enegwa, Collins Ebitimi

== Games ==
16 February NNL	Stores	1 – 1	Abia Comets	Lagos, Nigeria
	Musa Sadiq 80'	Report	Mark Kelechi 60'	Stadium: Onikan Stadium

22 February NNL	Gateway	1 – 1	Stores	Abeokuta
	(1H)		Jejelola Rilwan (2H)	Stadium: MKO Abiola Stadium

27 February NNL	Stores	2 – 0	Shooting Stars of Ibadan	Lagos, Nigeria
	Onwurebe Raphael 39'; Festus Ajah 56'	Report		Stadium: Onikan Stadium

1 March NNL	MFM FC	4 – 0	Stores	Lagos, Nigeria
	Akeodi Ekine; Sikiru Olatunbosun; Chukwuka Onuwa	[ Report]		Stadium: Agege Stadium

9 March NNL	Stores	3 – 2	Ekiti United	Lagos, Nigeria
	Onwurebe Raphael 9' (pen.), 90+' (pen.); Festus Ajah 10'	Report	Nya Dennis 44'; Adio Monsuru 88'	Stadium: Onikan Stadium

16 March NNL	Gabros	1 – 0	Stores	Nnewi
	Okereke Maduabuchi (2H)	[ Report]		Stadium: Gabros Stadium

23 March NNL	Stores	0 – 1	ABS FC	Lagos, Nigeria
			Dada Samuel (1H)	Stadium: Onikan Stadium

29 March NNL	Akwa Starlets FC	1 – 0	Stores	Uyo
				Stadium: Uyo Township Stadium

6 April NNL	Stores	2 – 0	UNICEM Rovers	Lagos
	Akeem 45+'; Jejelola (2H)	Report		Stadium: Onikan Stadium

13 April NNL	Remo Stars	0 – 0	Stores	Ijebu Ode
				Stadium: Otunba Dipo Dina International Stadium

14 April Lagos State FA Cup	Stores	0 – 3 (walkover)	Margate FC	Agege Stadium

21 April NNL	Stores	1 - 0	COD United	Lagos
8:00 am				Stadium: Onikan Stadium

27 April NNL	First Bank	2 - 1	Stores	Lagos
				Stadium: Agege Stadium

1 May NNL	Go Round	2 - 0	Stores	Omoku, Port Harcourt
				Stadium: Krisdera Hotel Stadium

8 May NNL	Stores	2 - 0	Bendel Insurance	Lagos
	Fuad 30'; Ajah 55'			Stadium: Onikan Stadium

11 May NNL	Prime FC	2 - 0	Stores

25 May NNL	Stores	2 - 0	Prime FC
	Fuad Elekojuoti 45+' (pen.), 85'
