= 2018 Nigeria Federation Cup =

Tournament details
- Country: Nigeria

Final positions
- Champions: Enugu Rangers

The 2018 Nigeria Federation Cup (known as the 2018 Aiteo Cup for sponsorship reasons) was the 77th edition of the football tournament. This edition of the competition began on 9 September 2018 and ended on 24 October 2018.

== First round ==
First round matches were played from 9 September to 11 September 2018.

Team 1	Score	Team 2
Akwa United	7–0	Hope of Glory
Aklosendi International	0–0 (6–5 p)	FRSC
Dan Masari	w/o	Go Round
Shooting Stars	0–0 (2–3 p)	Supreme Court
ABS	1–1 (2–3 p)	Kebbi
Enugu Rangers	0–0 (6–5 p)	Niger Tornadoes Feeders
Ekiti United	1–2	Mighty Jets
Kwara United	3–1	All Stars of MKO
Delta Stars	0–4	Kogi United
Chief of Staff	w/o	Niger Tornadoes*
George Turnah	1–2	Nasarawa United
Lobi Stars	1–1 (2–3 p)	Standard
Yobe Desert Stars	2–1	DMB
Zabgai	0–2	Plateau United
Nyasagwana	1–5	Ifeanyi Ubah
Doma United	1–4	J'Atete
Kano Pillars Feeders	0–0 (4–5 p)	Crown
Smart City	1–2	Abia Warriors
Bendel United	0–1	Remo Stars
Gusau Eleven	0–6	Rivers United
Ngwa	2–3	Kano Pillars
Sokoto United	0–0 (4–3 p)	MFM
Gombe United	1–1 (3–5 p)	Dynamite Force
Wasiu Alabelewe	0–3	Enyimba International
Cofine	1–1 (4–2 p)	Heartland
Wikki Tourists	w/o	Crime Busters
Sunshine Stars	3–1	Ifeanyi Ubah Feeders
Bayelsa United	4–1	Fasbir
Samba	0–3	El-Kanemi Warriors
Katsina United Feeders	w/o	Jigawa Golden Stars
Minda	1–2	Osun United
Katsina United	w/o	Madagali

- Tornadoes progressed to the last 32 after Chief of Staff failed to turn up for the match.

== Second round ==
Second round matches were played from 16, 17 September and 19 September 2018.

Team 1	Score	Team 2
Akwa United	5–2	Aklosendi International
Go Round	1–1 (3–5 p)	Supreme Court
Kebbi	0–3	Enugu Rangers
Mighty Jets	1–3	Kwara United
Kogi United	1–0	Niger Tornadoes
Nasarawa United	3–0	Standard
Yobe Desert Stars	0–1	Plateau United
Ifeanyi Ubah	0–1	J'Atete
Crown	1–3	Abia Warriors
Remo Stars	0–1	Rivers United
Kano Pillars	2–0	Sokoto United
Dynamite Force	2–0	Enyimba International
Cofine	0–2	Sunshine Stars
Wikki Tourists	4–1	Bayelsa United
El-Kanemi Warriors	1–0	Katsina United Feeders
Osun United	0–1	Katsina United

== Group stage ==
=== Group A ===
(at Patani Stadium, Gombe)

Round 2 [Sep 26] Katsina United 0-1 Enyimba J. Atete 1-3 Plateau United

Round 3 [Sep 27] J. Atete 2-4 Katsina United Plateau United 1-1 Enyimba

Round 1 [Sep 28] (moved from Sep 24) Plateau United 0-1 Katsina United J. Atete 0-5 Enyimba

Final Table:

1.Enyimba FC                         3   2  1  0   7- 1   7  Qualified
2.Katsina United                     3   2  0  1   5- 3   6  Qualified
- - - - - - - - - - - - - - - - - - - - - - - - - - - - - -
3.Plateau United                     3   1  1  1   4- 3   4
4.Julius Atete FC                    3   0  0  3   3-12   0

=== Group B ===
(at Sani Abacha Stadium, Kano)

Round 1 [Sep 24] Enugu Rangers 2-1 El-Kanemi Warriors Sunshine Stars 1-1 Supreme Court

Round 2 [Sep 26] Sunshine Stars 1-1 El-Kanemi Warriors Supreme Court n/p Enugu Rangers

Round 3 [Sep 28] Enugu Rangers 0-0 Sunshine Stars El-Kaneni Warriors 1-0 Supreme Court

Final Table:

1.Enugu Rangers International        2   1  1  0   2- 1   4  Qualified
2.El Kanemi Warriors                 3   1  1  1   3- 3   4  Qualified
- - - - - - - - - - - - - - - - - - - - - - - - - - - - - -
3.Sunshine Stars                     3   0  3  0   2- 2   3
4.Supreme Court FC                   2   0  1  1   1- 2   1

=== Group C ===
(at Agege Stadium, Lagos)

Round 1 [Sep 24] Kwara United 5-1 Abia Warriors Kano Pillars 3-2 Rivers United

Round 2 [Sep 26] Kano Pillars 1-2 Abia Warriors Rivers United 0-1 Kwara United

Round 3 [Sep 28] Kano Pillars 2-1 Kwara United Rivers United 0-1 Abia Warriors

Final Table:

1.Kwara United                       3   2  0  1   7- 3   6  Qualified
2.Kano Pillars                       3   2  0  1   6- 5   6  Qualified
- - - - - - - - - - - - - - - - - - - - - - - - - - - - - -
3.Abia Warriors                      3   2  0  1   4- 6   6
4.Rivers United                      3   0  0  3   2- 5   0

=== Group D ===
(at Enyimba International Stadium, Aba)

Round 1 [Sep 24] Akwa United 1-0 Wikki Tourists Nasarawa United 0-0 Kogi United

Round 2 [Sep 26] Kogi United 0-1 Akwa United Nasarawa United 1-0 Wikki Tourists

Round 3 [Sep 28] Akwa United 0-2 Nasarawa United Wikki Tourists 1-0 Kogi United

Final Table:

1.Nasarawa United                    3   2  1  0   3- 0   7  Qualified
2.Akwa United                        3   2  0  1   2- 2   6  Qualified
- - - - - - - - - - - - - - - - - - - - - - - - - - - - - -
3.Wikki Tourists                     3   1  0  2   1- 2   3
4.Kogi United                        3   0  1  2   0- 2   1

== Quarter-finals ==
[Oct 3] Kwara United 1-3 Katsina United [Agege stadium, Lagos]

Enugu Rangers 1-1 Akwa United [4-2 pen] [Sani Abacha stadium, Kano]

[Oct 4] Nasarawa United 1-0 El-Kanemi Warriors [Enyimba stadium, Aba]

[Oct 7] Enyimba 2-4 Kano Pillars [Patani stadium, Gombe]

== Semi-finals ==
[Oct 10] Enugu Rangers 4-2 Nasarawa United [Sani Abacha stadium, Kano]

Katsina United 2-2 Kano Pillars [1-4 pen] [Agege stadium, Lagos]

== Final ==
[Oct 24, Stephen Keshi stadium, Asaba]

Enugu Rangers 3-3 Kano Pillars [4-2 pen]
