= Nigeria National League =

Nigerian football national league

Coordinates: 9°1′47.8″N 7°26′51.4″E

- Founded: 1979 (reorganized 1991)
- Country: Nigeria
- Confederation: CAF
- Number of clubs: 34
- Level on pyramid: 2
- Promotion to: Nigeria Premier Football League
- Relegation to: Nigeria Nationwide League
- Domestic cup(s): Nigeria Federation Cup; Nigerian Super Cup
- International cup: CAF Confederation Cup (via Nigerian FA Cup)
- Current champions: Sporting Lagos (2025–26)
- Most championships: Dolphins/Eagle Cement• Niger Tornadoes (3 titles each)
- Website: nnl.com.ng
- Current: 2026–27 Nigeria National League

The Nigeria National League (NNL) (formerly the National Division 1) is the second-highest tier in the Nigerian football league system, after the Nigeria Premier Football League, and is currently contested by 36 clubs.

Each season, four teams are promoted to the Nigeria Premier Football League, via NNL Super 4/NNL Super 8, however from the 2025–26 season, the top teams from each group gets promoted directly with the "Super 4" used to determine the overall league winner. The twelve lowest-finishing teams in the Nigerian National League are relegated to Nigeria Nationwide League.

== History ==
From 1997-2011, the league has been split into 1A for Northern teams and 1B for southern teams. The top two from each division are promoted to the Nigerian Premier League the next season. The exceptions were the 2005–06 and 2006-07 seasons where there were four divisions of eight teams each, with each division winner winning promotion. Up to four teams in each division are relegated each season to the Amateur First Division. The league was renamed 19 June 2008. In 2012 the league expanded from 32 to 36 teams with 2 more teams promoted. The league used the 2006 format, with four divisions of nine teams each, with division winners receiving automatic promotion. In 2012-13, it went back to two divisions of sixteen. For the 2015 season, it used four divisions of eight teams.

== 2024–25 season ==
Conference A

Team	Location	Stadium	Capacity
1472 FC	Lagos	Mobolaji Johnson Arena	10,000
Abia Comets	Umuahia	Umuahia Township Stadium	5,000
Beyond Limits	Ikenne	Remo Stars Stadium	5,000
Crown FC	Ogbomosho	Soun Stadium	–
Dakkada	Uyo	Uyo Township Stadium	
Edel	Awka	Awka City Stadium	
Igbajo	Ile-Ogbo, Osun	Lanre Leke Stadium	
Ijele	Enugu	Nnamdi Azikiwe Stadium	22,000
Inter Lagos	Lagos	Mobolaji Johnson Arena	5,000
Smart City	Lagos	Mobolaji Johnson Arena	5,000
Warri Wolves	Warri	Warri Township Stadium	20,000

Conference B

Team	Location	Stadium	Capacity
Abakaliki	Abakaliki	Pa Ngele Oruta Township Stadium	
ABS	Ilorin	Kwara State Stadium	18,000
First Bank FC	Lagos	Mobolaji Johnson Arena	10,000
Gateway United	Abeokuta	MKO Abiola Stadium	10,000
Godswill Akpabio FC	Uyo	Uyo Township Stadium	5,000
Kun Khalifat FC	Owerri	Dan Anyiam Stadium	10,000
Madiba	Lagos	Mobolaji Johnson Arena	10,000
Osun United	Osogbo	Osogbo Township Stadium	10,000
Calabar Rovers	Calabar	U.J. Esuene Stadium	16,000
Solution FC	Awka	Awka City Stadium	3,000
Sporting Lagos	Lagos	Mobolaji Johnson Arena	10,000

Conference C

Team	Location	Stadium	Capacity
Barau	Dambatta	Dambatta Stadium	
Gombe United	Gombe	Pantami Stadium	12,000
Jigawa Golden Stars	Dutse	Kazaure Stadium	
Mighty Jets	Jos	New Jos Stadium	60,000
Sokoto United	Sokoto	Giginya Memorial Stadium	
Wikki Tourists	Bauchi	Abubakar Tafawa Balewa Stadium	11,000
Zamfara United	Gusau	FIFA Goal Project Pitch, Birnin Kebbi	

Conference D

Team	Location	Stadium	Capacity
Adamawa United	Yola	Ribadu Square Stadium	5,000
Basira	Lafia	Lafia City Stadium	10,000
Doma United	Gombe	Pantami Stadium	12,000
Kada Warriors	Kaduna	Ahmadu Bello Stadium	16,000
Kebbi United	Birnin Kebbi	FIFA Goal Project Pitch	
Sporting Supreme	Bwari	Bwari Stadium	
Yobe Desert Stars	Damaturu	27 August Stadium	

== 2019-20 season ==
The season kicked off in November 2019. The 42 teams were consolidated back into four divisions.

The league went for the December break, and didn't return. The league was later cancelled due to the outbreak of Covid-19 outbreak in Nigeria. No team was promoted to the Premier division after football activities were stopped due to the rampaging effect of Covid-19.

Group A1

- ABS FC
- Aklosendi Int'l
- DMD Borno
- Federal Road Safety FC
- Green Beret FC
- Kada City F.C.
- Kebbi United
- Kogi United
- NAF FC
- Malumfashi FC
- Oyah Sports
- FC Zamfara

Group A2

- EFCC F.C.
- El-Kanemi Warriors
- Gombe United
- Kwara United
- Mighty Jets
- Rarara FC
- Sokoto United
- Niger Tornadoes
- Yobe Desert Stars

Group B1

- Abia Comets
- Apex Krane FC, Delta State
- Ibom Youth
- Dynamite FC
- Ekiti United
- Gateway United F.C.
- Giant Brillars
- Go Round F.C.
- Nilàyo FC
- Osun United F.C.
- Shooting Stars S.C.

Group B2

- Bayelsa United
- Bendel Insurance
- Calabar Rovers
- Crown F.C.
- J'Atete FC
- Joy Cometh FC
- Lamray United
- Remo Stars F.C.
- Stationery Stores F.C.
- Vandrezzer FC

== 2020/21 Season ==
On 6 November 2020, the league's organizing committee agreed to continue the four division North and South format for the 2021 season. The start date was to be three weeks after the top division NPFL resumes. The league is expected to start on 30 January 2021 after the successful draws at the Congress held on Friday 15 January at Ebonyi State

On Saturday 30 January 2021, an Emergency congress took place in Ebonyi State where the kick off date was changed to 13 February 2021. 21 clubs voted in favor of 13 February while 4 clubs voted in favor of 6 February

Group A1

- ABS FC, Ilorin
- EFCC FC, Abuja
- Hyperbuzz, Maiduguri
- Kogi United
- Mailantarki Carr
- Mighty Jets

Group A2

- DMD Borno
- Federal Road Safety FC
- G&K Shekarau FC, Kano
- Kebbi United
- Kogi United
- Malumfashi United
- Niger Tornadoes, Minna
- Yobe Desert Stars F.C.
- Zamfara United

Group B1

- Calabar Rovers
- Delta Force F.C.
- Dynamite Force FC, Benin
- Ekiti United
- Giant Brillars, Enugu
- Go Round F.C., Omoku
- Nilàyo FC, Abeokuta
- Nnewi United
- Osun United F.C.
- 3SC, Ibadan
- Stationery Stores F.C., Lagos
- Vandrezzer FC, Lagos

Group B2

- Abia Comets F.C.
- Apex Krane FC, Delta State
- Bayelsa United
- Bendel Insurance
- Crown F.C.
- Gateway United F.C.
- Godosky FC, Anambra
- Holy Arrows FC, Oleh
- Ibom Youths FC, Uyo
- J'Atete FC, Ughelli
- Joy Cometh FC, Lagos
- FC One Rocket, Ikot Ekpene
- Remo Stars F.C.

== Nigeria National League Stadiums 2020-21 ==
Team	Location	Stadium	Capacity
Mighty Jets F.C.	Jos	New Jos Stadium	60,000
FC Taraba	Jalingo	Jalingo City Stadium	30,000
Calabar Rovers F.C.	Calabar	U. J. Esuene Stadium	25,000
Kogi United F.C.	Lokoja	Confluence Stadium	25,000
Vandrezzer FC	Lagos	Teslim Balogun Stadium	24,325
Giant Brillars	Enugu	Nnamdi Azikiwe Stadium	22,000
Apex Krane FC	Asaba	Stephen Keshi Stadium	22,000
ABS FC	Ilorin	Kwara State Stadium	18,000
Gombe United F.C.	Gombe	Pantami Stadium	12,000
Bendel Insurance F.C.	Benin City	Samuel Ogbemudia Stadium	12,000
El-Kanemi Warriors F.C.	Maiduguri	El-Kanemi Stadium	10,000
Osun United F.C.	Osogbo	Oshogbo Stadium	10,000
Crown F.C.	Ibadan	Adamasingba Stadium	10,000
Shooting Stars S.C.	Ibadan	Adamasingba Stadium	10,000
Stationery Stores F.C.	Lagos	Onikan Stadium	10,000
Aklosendi International	Lafia	Lafia Township Stadium	10,000
Green Berets of Zaria	Zaria	Zaria Township Stadium	10,000
Nnewi United	Oba	Rojenny International Stadium	10,000
Gateway United F.C.	Abeokuta	MKO Abiola Stadium	10,000
DMD Borno	Mauduguri	El-Kanemi Stadium	10,000
Nilàyo FC	Abeokuta	MKO Abiola Stadium	10,000
Delta Force F.C.	Ogwashi Ukwu	Jay Jay Okocha Stadium	8,000
Abia Comets F.C.	Umuahia	Umuahia Township Stadium	5,000
Bayelsa United F.C.	Yenagoa	Yenagoa Township Stadium	5,000
Niger Tornadoes F.C.	Minna	Minna Township Stadium	5,000
Sokoto United F.C.	Sokoto	Giginya Memorial Stadium	5,000
EFCC FC	Abuja	Old Parade Ground	5,000
NAF Rockets F.C.	Abuja	Old Parade Ground	5,000
Federal Road Safety FC	Abuja	Old Parade Ground	5,000
Oyah Sports International	Minna	Minna Township Stadium	5,000
Holy Arrows FC	Ughelli	Ughelli Township Stadium	5,000
J'Atete FC	Ughelli	Ughelli Township Stadium	5,000
Remo Stars F.C.	Ikenne	Remo Stars Stadium	5,000
Zamfara United F.C.	Gusau	Sardauna Memorial Stadium	5,000
Ibom Youths FC	Ikot Ekpene	Ikot Ekpene Stadium	5,000
FC One Rocket	Ikot Ekpene	Ikot Ekpene Stadium	5,000
Ekiti United	Ado-Ekiti	Oluyemi Kayode Stadium	4,000
Joy Cometh FC	Lagos	Agege Stadium	4,000
Godosky FC	Nnewi	Gabros Stadium	3,000
Yobe Desert Stars F.C.	Damaturu	Potiskum Stadium	2,000
Rarara FC	Katsina	Kahuta Stadium	2,000
Dynamite Force FC	Benin City	Western Boys Stadium	2,000
Kebbi United	Birnin Kebbi	Haliru Abdu Stadium	2,000
Go Round F.C.	Omoku	Krisdera Hotel Stadium	1,000
G&K Shekarau FC	Kano	Sabon Gari Stadium	1,000
Malumfashi United	Malumfashi	Township Stadium	1,000

== Past winners ==
The league was a single table until 1998. Between 1998-2011 winners of the North and South divisions played a one-game playoff to determine the overall Division champion. 2011-2017 the champion was determined by a Super Four mini-league between the four promoted teams. In 2018 it was a Super Eight to pick the four teams.

Season	Winner
1991	El-Kanemi Warriors
1992	Concord FC, Abeokuta
1993	Enyimba
1994	Eagle Cement
1995	Kano Pillars
1996	Niger Tornadoes
1997	Kwara United
1998	Kwara Stars
1999	Udoji United
2000	El-Kanemi Warriors
2001	Sunshine Stars F.C.
2002	Dolphins F.C. (Nigeria)
2003	Mighty Jets F.C.
2004	Nasarawa United
2006	Zamfara United
2007	Sunshine Stars F.C.
2008	Warri Wolves
2008/09	Dolphins F.C. (Nigeria)

Season	Winner
2009/10	Crown F.C.
2010/11	Wikki Tourists
2012	Nembe City F.C.
2013	Giwa F.C.
2014	Gabros International F.C.
2015	Niger Tornadoes F.C.
2016	Katsina United F.C.
2017	Go Round F.C.
2018	Kada City F.C.
2019	Dakkada F.C.
2020	abandoned
2021	Niger Tornadoes
2022	Bendel Insurance F.C.
2023	Heartland F.C.
2024	Beyond Limits
2025	Warri Wolves
2026	Sporting Lagos

== See also ==
- List of football clubs in Nigeria
