= Godswill Akpabio F.C. =

Association football club based in Uyo, Akwa Ibom State, Nigeria

- Full name: Godswill Akpabio United Football Club
- Founded: 2024; 2 years ago
- Ground: Uyo Township Stadium
- Capacity: 5,000
- Owner: Godswill Akpabio
- Chairman: Unoma Akpabio
- Head coach: Edward Green
- League: Nigeria National League
- 2025–26: Nigeria National League, 7th of 10 (Conference B)

Godswill Akpabio United Football Club is a professional football club based in Uyo, Akwa Ibom, Nigeria. The team competes in Nigeria National League, the second level of the Nigerian football league system.

The club was established in 2024 and named after its founder, Godswill Akpabio.

== History ==
=== Founding ===
In September 2016, former governor of Akwa Ibom, Godswill Akpabio, revealed his intention to establish a football team. Speaking to journalists, Akpabio said: “I am very determined to have a team, not just a football team but a team in terms of athletics.”

Eight years later, the Essien Udim-born politician turned his dream into reality, with the establishment of Godswill Akpabio United Football Club in September 2024.

The club was officially unveiled on 26 November 2026.

=== Maiden season ===
Godswill Akpabio United Football Club was formally launched on 26 November 2024. At the inauguration ceremony, held at Godswill Akpabio Stadium, the club also unveiled 35 players for the 2024–25 Nigeria National League season. They kicked off their campaign with a trip to Gateway United on 7 December 2024. The game finished goalless.

Later on, they found themselves fighting against the drop into the third tier. Despite serious threat of relegation, head coach Patrick Udoh was confident his side would retain their second-tier status. Asked to comment on his team's survival chances in an interview with Complete Sports with just four matches left to play, Udoh said: “No doubt it has been a difficult season. The league is really tough, but I’m confident we’ll retain our NNL spot at the close of the season.”

They ultimately beat the drop on the final day of the season by defeating Gateway United 3-0 at home. The result sent Gateway United back to the Nigeria Nationwide League.

== Facilities ==
=== Stadium ===
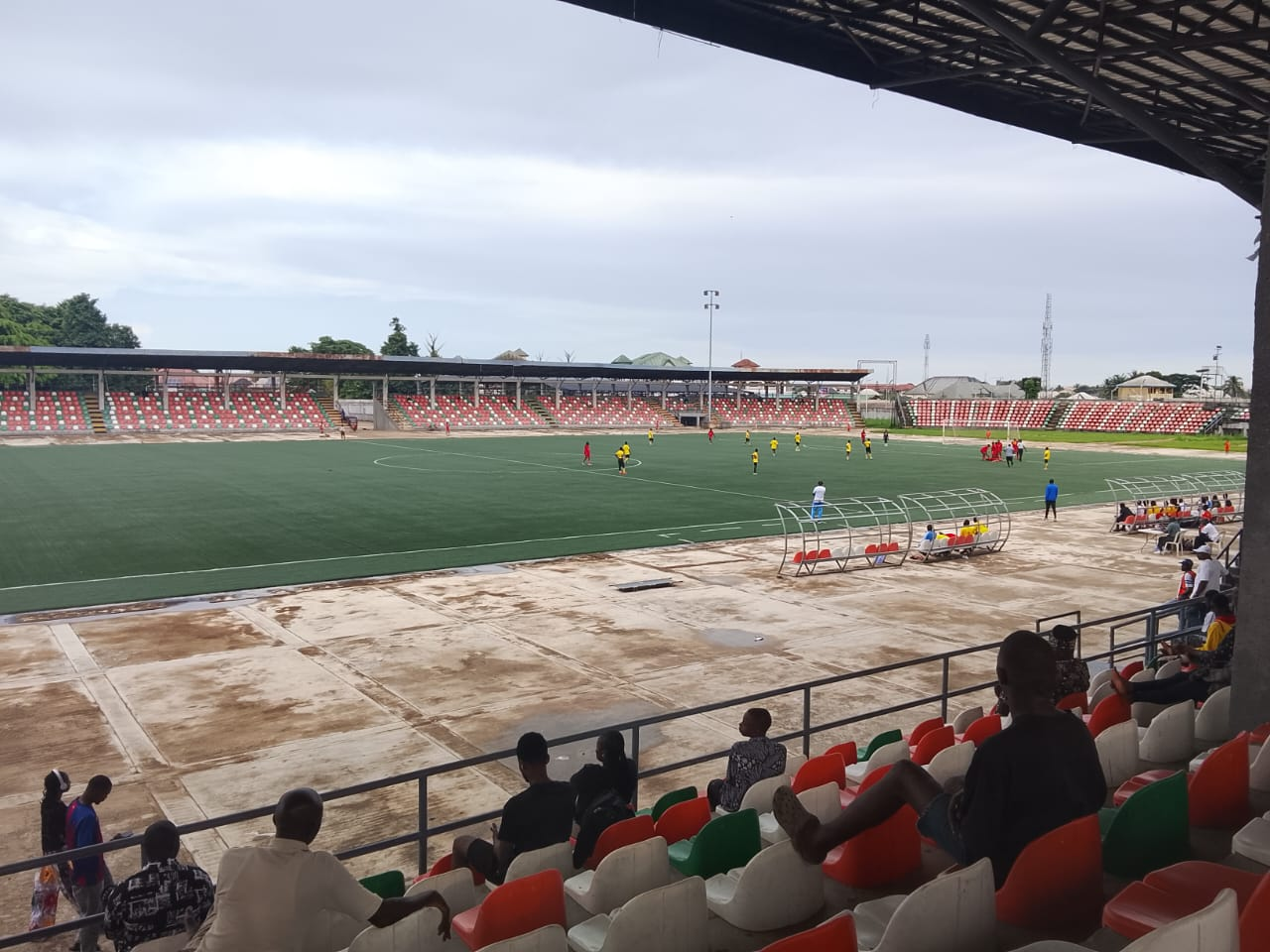
Regular Stand at Uyo Township Stadium

Godswill Akpabio United play their home matches at Uyo Township Stadium.

The stadium has a current capacity of 5,000 with four stands.

Godswill Akpabio F.C. shares the stadium with Akwa United, Dakkada and Ibom Angels.

== Current squad ==
As of 25 July 2026

Note: Flags indicate national team as defined under FIFA eligibility rules; some limited exceptions apply. Players may hold more than one non-FIFA nationality.

No.	Pos.	Nation	Player
2	DF	NGA	Precious Maduka
3	DF	NGA	Elijah Okon
7	FW	NGA	Emmanuel Joseph
8	FW	NGA	Dauda Umar
10	FW	NGA	Isaac George
11	FW	NGA	Nsikak Moses
12	DF	NGA	Samuel Bassey
13	DF	NGA	Abraham Jeremiah
14	MF	NGA	Azibato Miebogo
16	FW	NGA	Annaibiong Ukoette
18	GK	NGA	Robert Cole
19	FW	NGA	Utipime Sunday
20	MF	NGA	Eugene Dung
21		NGA	Victor Obiowo=GK
22	FW	NGA	Solomon Akpan

No.	Pos.	Nation	Player
23	DF	NGA	Ogunjobi Kamoru
24	DF	NGA	Victor Emmah
25	MF	NGA	Wisdom Tom
26	DF	NGA	Martins Ikpe
28	DF	NGA	Oloke Seun
32	GK	NGA	Thomas Omokhudu
39	FW	NGA	Daniel Offiong
45	DF	NGA	Yusuf Oladotun

== See also ==
2025–26 Nigeria National League
