= Ernest Chidibere =

Nigerian footballer

Chidiebere Ernest (born 14 November 2004), commonly known as Chidi Ernest is a Nigerian professional footballer. He plays as a midfielder for club GKS WIKIELEC

== Club career ==
After beginning his career at Kwara United FC he moved to Gombe United.

=== Niger Tornados Fc ===
He signed with Nigerian Professional Football League club Niger Tornados F.C. in October 2021, penning three-year contract with them where he played regularly during his debut season and made 26match appearances with 5goals.
