= Edel FC =

Nigerian professional football club

Edel F.C.
- Full name: Edel Football Club
- Nickname: The Galloping Zebras
- Founded: 2017; 9 years ago
- Ground: Awka City Stadium
- Capacity: 3000
- Owner: Jude Edeh
- Manager: Michael Chukwuebuka
- League: Nigeria National League
- 2025–26: Nigeria National League, 6th of 10 (Conference A)

Edel Football Club is a Nigerian professional football club based in Awka, Anambra State, Nigeria. The club competes in the Nigeria National League, the second tier of club football in the Nigerian football league system.

== History ==
Edel was initially established in 2017 as Nnewi United Football Club (nicknamed the Anaedo Lions). For its first several years, the team operated out of Nnewi and played its home fixtures at the Rojenny Stadium in Oba, Anambra State.

In 2023, under the direction of owner Jude Edeh and General Manager Olisa Onuchukwu, the club dropped the Nnewi United name to become Edel Football Club, introducing the "Galloping Zebras" moniker and a sharp green-and-white color profile. The club shifted its headquarters from Oba to the capital city of Awka, adopting the modern AstroTurf facilities at the Awka City Stadium.
