= Paul Offor =

Nigerian football manager

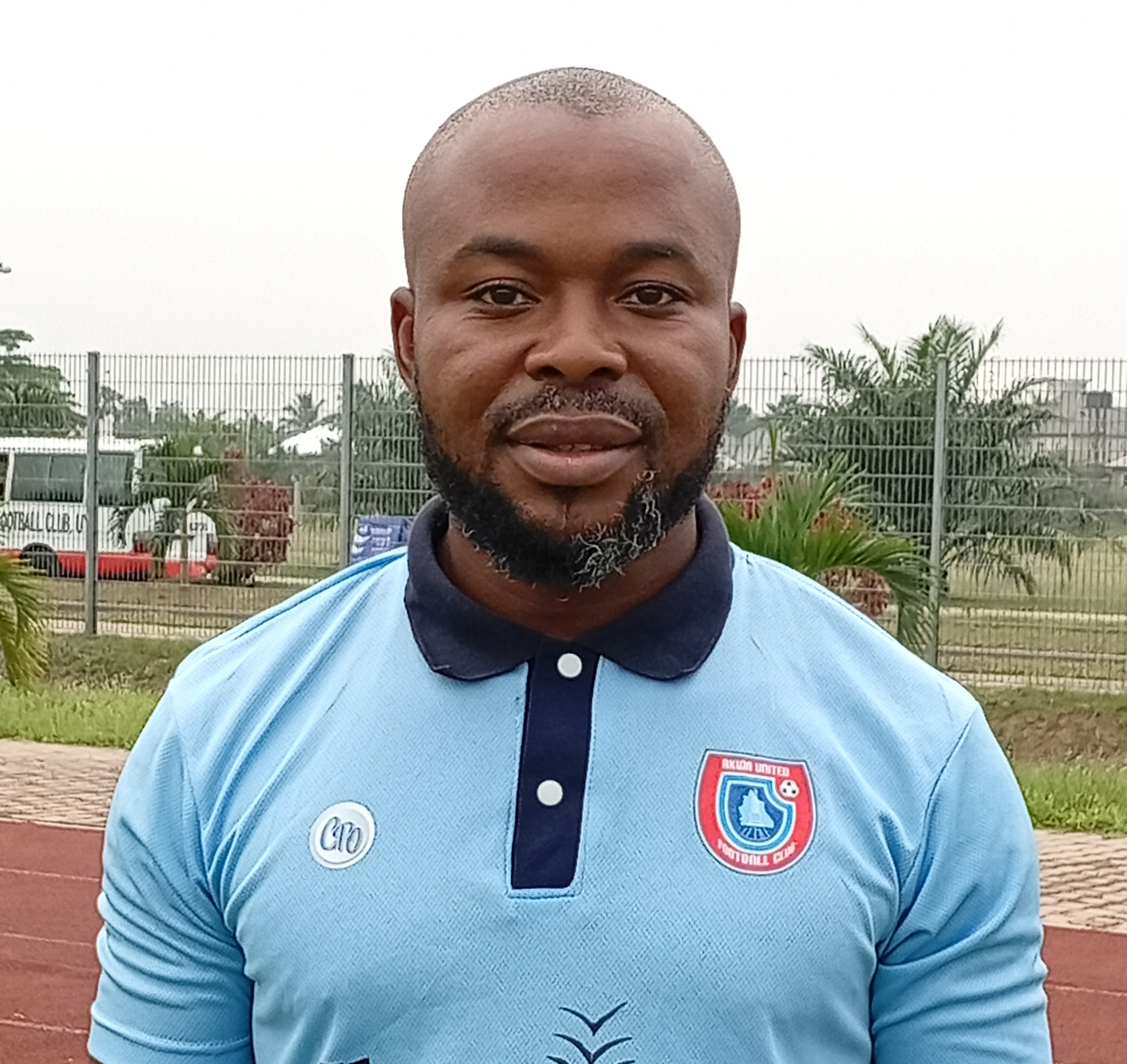
- Paul Offor in 2026

Personal information
- Full name: Paul Offor
- Date of birth: 17 December 1988 (age 37)
- Place of birth: Aniocha North

Team information
- Current team: Akwa United (head coach)

Managerial career
- Years: Team
- 2021–2022: Warri Wolves
- 2022–2023: CIFAS de Djeffa
- 2023–2024: Sporting Lagos
- 2024: Kano Pillars
- 2024–2025: Grassrunners F.C.
- 2025–: Akwa United

Paul Offor (born 17 December 1988) is a Nigerian professional football manager who is head coach of Nigerian club Akwa United.

== Coaching career ==
Offor kicked off his managerial career in 2021 at Warri Wolves. He was made the Seasiders' head coach following the dismissal of Evans Ogenyi.

In March 2023, Offor was named head coach of Sporting Lagos. Barely four months later, he led the club to gain promotion to the Nigerian topflight, with wins over FC One Rocket and Abeokuta Stormers in the Nigeria National League Super 8 Playoffs. The following year, he parted ways with the Lagos club along with his assistants, following a string of poor results.

Soon after his departure from the Tech Boys, he emerged as one of the favorites to succeed Finidi George as Enyimba coach, after the 1994 AFCON winner left the Aba club to become Nigeria coach. However, the move didn't materialize. He ended up signing a contract with Kano Pillars instead. He reportedly put pen to paper on a one-year contract at the Kano club. However, his reign swiftly became a short-lived nightmare, as he departed his role after just 19 days after a new board replaced the one that hired him.

He returned to coaching two months later, after penning a three-year contract with Grassrunners, who were set to compete in the Nigeria Nationwide League at the time.

In August 2025, Offor was announced as Akwa United head coach.

== Honours ==
=== Club ===
- Naija Super 8 (2023) – gold

=== Individual ===
- Nigeria National League Coach of the Month, December 2025
- Nigeria National League Coach of the Month, January 2026
- Nigeria National League Coach of the Month, February 2026
