= Abeokuta Stormers SC =

Football club based in Abeokuta, Nigeria

Abeokuta Stormers Sports Club, formerly known as FC Nilayo is a football club based in Abeokuta, Nigeria. They play in the Nigeria Nationwide League (NLO1), the third tier of club football in Nigeria, after facing relegation from the Nigeria National League (NNL) in 2024.

They play their home matches at the MKO Abiola Stadium, Abeokuta.

== History ==
Abeokuta Stormers SC was established in 2005 by Bukola Olopade.
