= First Bank F.C. =

Nigerian football club

First Bank Football Club
- Full name: First Bank Football Club
- Nickname: The Elephant Boys/The Bankers
- Ground: Onikan Stadium, Lagos; Teslim Balogun Stadium, Surulere
- Capacity: 10,000/25,000
- Chairman: Errol Gbolahan
- Manager: Gabriel Monday
- League: Nigeria National League
Home colours

First Bank FC is a Nigerian soccer club run by First Bank of Nigeria and based in Lagos. Besides football, the bank also runs clubs in various other sports, including basketball.

== Former Players ==
(Nigeria) (Indonesia) Victor Igbonefo 2003 - 2004

== Current squad ==
Note: Flags indicate national team as defined under FIFA eligibility rules; some limited exceptions apply. Players may hold more than one non-FIFA nationality.

No.	Pos.	Nation	Player
1	GK	NGR	Okeegbo Ndubuisi
3		NGR	Ibe Chigozie (Captain)
4		NGR	Uwaozuma Ifeanyi
6		NGR	Oladapo Ayoola
7		NGR	Kareem Kenny Abubakar
10		NGR	Richard Femi
8		NGR	Ohaegbu Izuchukwu
11		NGR	Emmanuel Egesi
12		NGR	Omoyegun Nurudeen
13		NGR	Olanrewaju Rahman

No.	Pos.	Nation	Player
17		NGR	Okonkwo Nonso
18		NGR	Oladejo Femi
20		NGR	Onaolapo Yinka
24		NGR	Amoo Rahman
25		NGR	Guobadia Isoken
29		NGR	Salami Sheriff
35		NGR	Oghenevo Uzezi Oladimeji Salvador

== Sources ==
- The Punch
- P.M. news
- NFL wields big stick against Insurance, First Bank, Eko United
- First bank may be disbanded
- Blog with game notes, pictures
