= Kebbi United =

Nigerian professional football club

- Founded: 2018
- Ground: FIFA Goal Project Pitch, Birnin Kebbi
- Capacity: 267
- Owner: Kebbi State
- Chairman: Mansir Bawa
- Manager: Nura Abdullahi-Koko
- League: Nigeria National League
- 2025–26: Nigeria National League, 5th of 8 (Conference D)

Kebbi United Football Club is a Nigerian professional football club based in Birnin Kebbi, Kebbi State, Nigeria. The club competes in the Nigeria National League, the second tier of club football in the Nigerian football league system.

== History ==
The establishment of the club was officially approved by the Kebbi State Government under the administration of former Governor Abubakar Atiku Bagudu to harness and empower youth in the state. Kebbi United played its home matches at the Haliru Abdu Stadium.

For years, Kebbi United bounced between the Nigerian third division Nigeria Nationwide League One and the Nigerian second division NNL. The team has since solidified its status in the NNL, consistently pushing for promotion to the top-flight Nigeria Premier Football League (NPFL).

== Stadium ==
Kebbi United FC plays its home matches at the FIFA Goal Project Pitch (also known as the Birnin Kebbi FIFA Mini-Stadium) located in Birnin Kebbi, Kebbi State.
