= Potiskum Stadium =

Sports venue in Yobe, Nigeria

Coordinates: 11.7213°N 11.0987°E

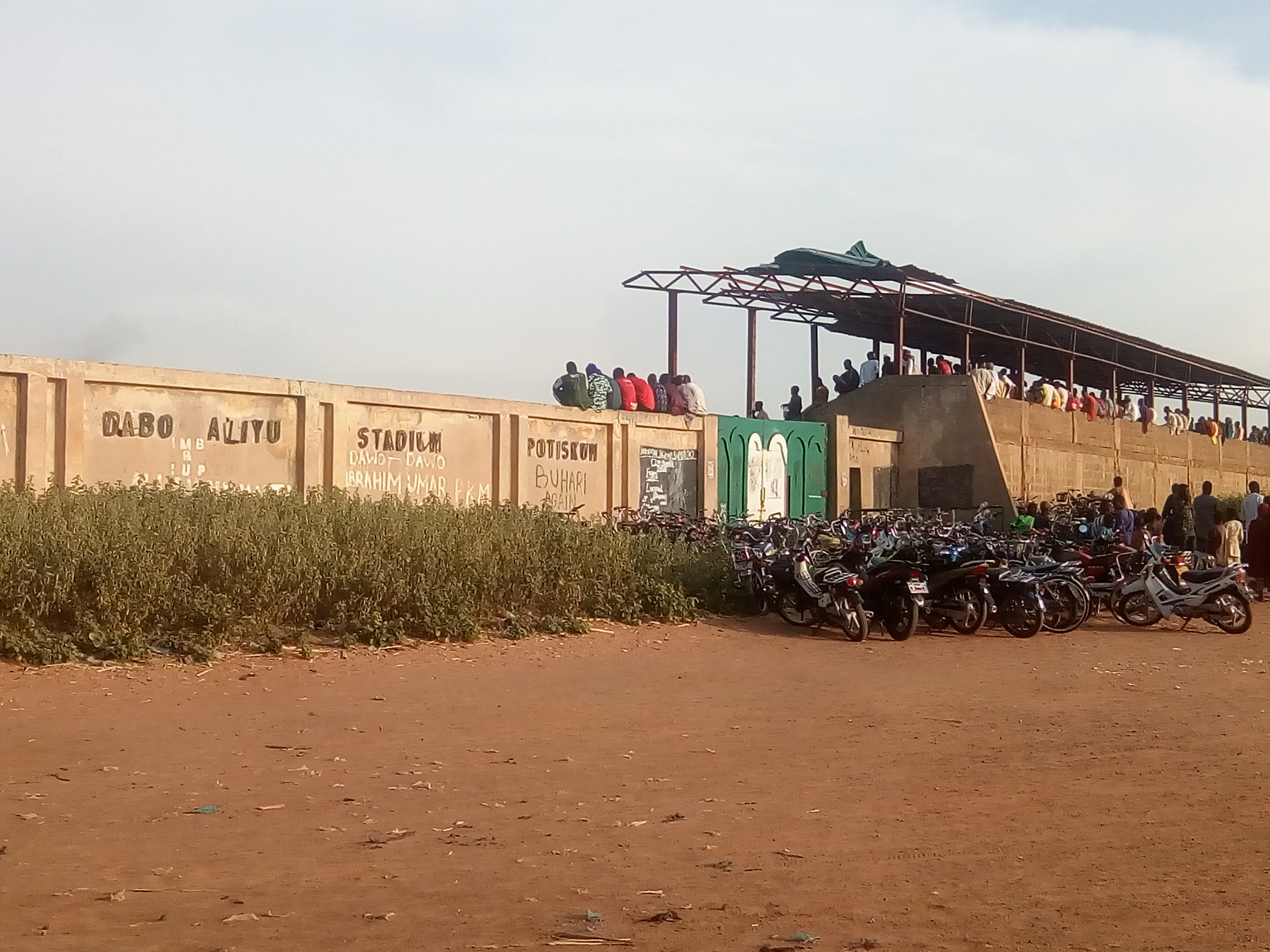
- Interactive map of Potiskum Stadium
- Address: Potiskum; Nigeria
- Location: Cross Din-Uganda, Yan Katako, Potiskum
- Capacity: 2000
- Surface: Grass

Potiskum Stadium is a stadium in Potiskum, Nigeria and the home ground of Yobe Desert Stars F.C. of the Nigeria National League. Capacity of the stadium is 2,000.

== Overview ==
Potiskum Stadium serves as a key sports venue in Yobe State, hosting local football matches and serving as the home ground for the Nigeria National League side Yobe Desert Stars F.C.
