= U. J. Esuene Stadium =

Football stadium in Calabar, Nigeria

U.J. Esuene Stadium
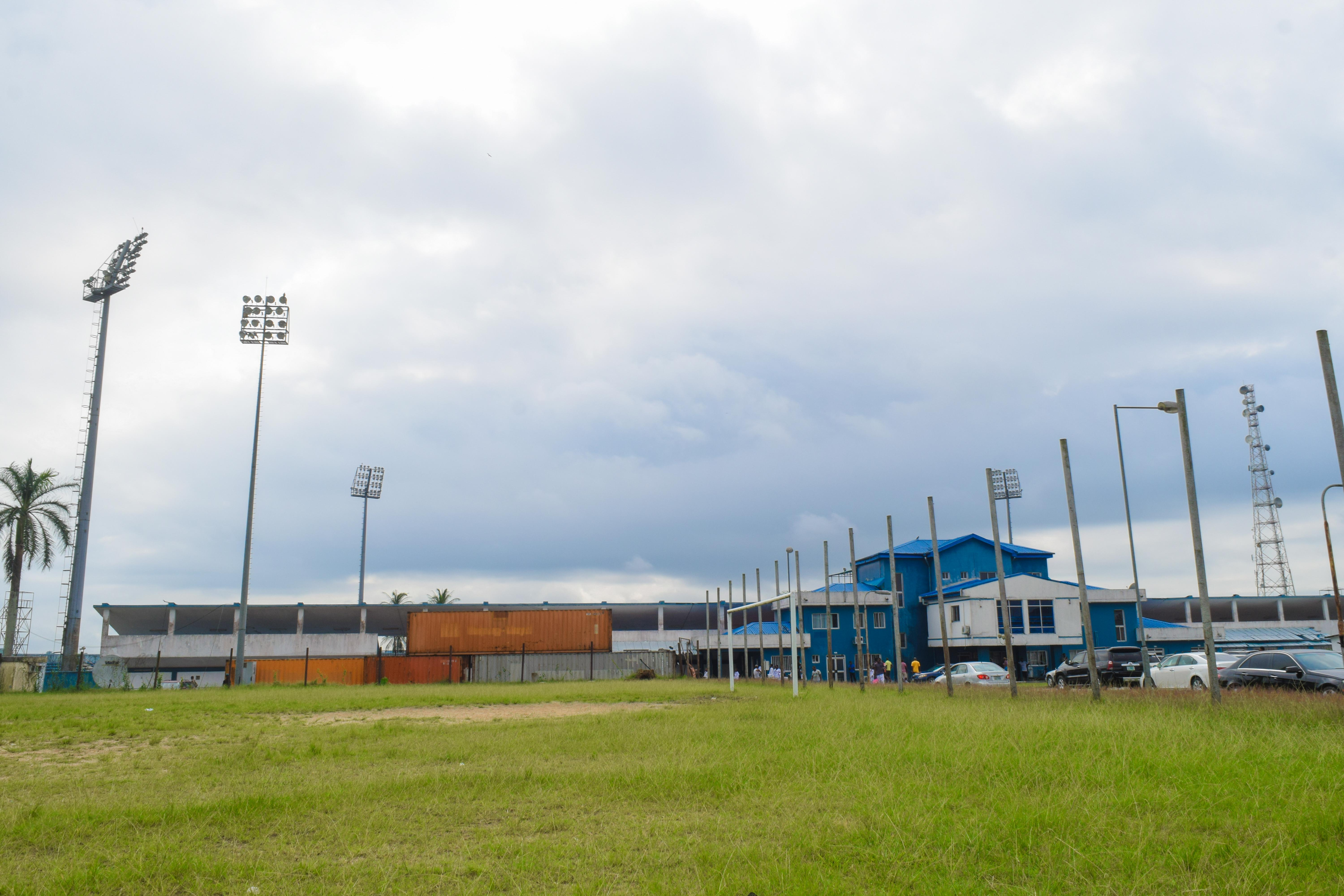
- Interactive map of U.J. Esuene Stadium
- Full name: Udokaha Jacob Esuene Stadium
- Location: Calabar, Nigeria
- Coordinates: 4.9677°N 8.3269°E
- Capacity: 16,000

Construction
- Opened: 1977

Tenant
- Calabar Rovers

The U. J. Esuene Stadium is a multi-purpose stadium in Calabar, Nigeria. It is used mostly for football matches and is the home stadium of Calabar Rovers and previously Dolphins F.C. The stadium has a capacity of 16,000 and was opened in 1977.

== History ==
The UJ Esuene Stadium was inaugurated on 2 April, 1977 with a match between Benin's Bendel Insurance F.C. and newly formed Calabar Rovers of Calabar. Two weeks later, the stadium hosted an international encounter between Enugu Rangers and Tonnerre Yaoundé - a game that featured the likes of Roger Milla, Christian Chukwu and Emmanuel Okala.

Games at the 2003 All-Africa Games were also played at the U. J. Esuene Stadium in October 2003, as were Nigeria's qualifiers for the 2008 Africa Cup of Nations. It was also shortlisted as a stadium for the 2009 FIFA U-17 World Cup and hosted eight games, including the South Korea-Nigeria quarterfinal.

The stadium has been further upgraded to include an ultra-modern electronic video-matrix scoreboard, with impressive floodlights.

== Notable football matches hosted ==
=== 1999 FIFA World Youth Championship ===
Date	Team 1	Result	Team 2	Attendance	Round
5 April 1999	Zambia	4–3	Honduras	12,000	Group F
5 April 1999	Spain	2–0	Brazil	12,000	Group F
8 April 1999	Zambia	0–0	Spain	8,000	Group F
14 April 1999	Brazil	4–0	Croatia	12,000	Round of 16

=== 2009 FIFA U-17 World Cup ===
Date	Team 1	Result	Team 2	Attendance	Round
25 October 2009	Iran	2–0	Gambia	9,200	Group C
25 October 2009	Colombia	2–1	Netherlands	10,100	Group C
28 October 2009	Netherlands	2–1	Gambia	6,800	Group C
28 October 2009	Iran	0–0	Colombia	8,600	Group C
31 October 2009	Gambia	2–2	Colombia	6,100	Group C
31 October 2009	New Zealand	1–1	Turkey	7,000	Group D
5 November 2009	Iran	1–2 (a.e.t.)	Uruguay	3,600	Round of 16
9 November 2009	South Korea	1–3	Nigeria	9,100	Quarter-final
