= Ekiti United F.C. =

Nigerian football club

Ekiti United FC
- Full name: Ekiti United Football Club
- Founded: 2000; 26 years ago
- Owner: Ekiti State government
- Manager: Jayden Damilola
- League: Nigeria National League

Ekiti United is a football club based in Ekiti State. It plays in the Nigeria national league, a second division of Nigeria football league.
