= Abia Comets F.C. =

Nigerian football club

- Full name: Abia Comets Football Club
- Nickname: Resilient Boys
- Founded: 1996
- Ground: Umuahia Township Stadium
- Capacity: 5,000
- Chairman: Boniface Alozie Uche (Bontus)
- Manager: Kelvin Okechukwu Ejeh
- League: Nigeria National League
- 2023 /2024: 5th
- Website: www.abiacometfc.blogspot.com
Home colours

Abia Comets is a Nigerian football club based in Umuahia. They play in the second-tier of Nigerian football, the Nigeria National League. They currently play in the Umuahia Township Stadium.

== Current squad ==
Note: Flags indicate national team as defined under FIFA eligibility rules; some limited exceptions apply. Players may hold more than one non-FIFA nationality.

No.	Pos.	Nation	Player
1	GK	NGA	Ogoke Kingsley
16	GK	NGA	Okey Egbo
34	GK	NGA	Benjamin Ikenna
39	GK	NGA	Baruwa Adedamola
36	GK	NGA	Onyemaobi Somadina
5	DF	NGA	Sampson Okoh
4	DF	NGA	Amaobi Ifeanyi
17	DF	NGA	Dimgba Ogechi
19	DF	NGA	Kola Awe
20	DF	NGA	Ogenyi Daniel
25	DF	NGA	Iluyomode Benjamin
32	DF	NGA	Solomon Miocheal
37	DF	NGA	Emenike Nkume
3	DF	NGA	Philip David
21	DF	NGA	Kelechi Ogoh

No.	Pos.	Nation	Player
10	MF	NGA	Nelson Emmanuel
18	MF	NGA	Amadi Enyinnaya
2	MF	NGA	Tosin Adegbite
6	MF	NGA	Adams Udobong
11	MF	NGA	Effiong Ekom
15	MF	NGA	Lawrence Effiong
22	MF	NGA	Ini Edem Ubon
30	MF	NGA	Achase Samuel
40	MF	NGA	Mancy Ayeya
9	S	NGA	Abdulkareem Mumini
13	S	NGA	Okoro Marshal
14	S	NGA	Victor Udo
27	S	NGA	Ibrahim Olawoyin
35	S	NGA	Mark K. Daniel

- Chief coach: Bethel Orji
- TM: John Onuoha
- Club president: Hon. Victor Nwakanma
- Club secretary: Ezindu Hyacinth
