= Remo Stars Stadium =

Soccer-specific stadium in Nigeria

- Interactive map of Remo Stars Stadium
- Location: Ikenne, Nigeria
- Coordinates: 6°51′56″N 3°42′15″E
- Capacity: 5,000

Tenants
- Remo Stars F.C.

Remo Stars Stadium is an association football stadium in Ikenne, Nigeria. It is currently used mostly for football matches and is the home stadium of Remo Stars of the Nigeria Premier Football League and Beyond Limits F.A.. The stadium has a capacity of 5,000 spectators.

The stadium was opened in 2020 and hosted its first league game in 2021.

== Construction and development ==
The Remo Stars Stadium underwent significant redevelopment works involving the installation of a hybrid synthetic pitch system and broader facility upgrades. The project was executed by Monimichelle Sports Facility Construction Limited, a Nigerian sports infrastructure company specializing in stadium construction, turf engineering, and facility management.

Monimichelle Sports was responsible for designing and constructing the hybrid playing surface at the stadium, which was later recognized for meeting international performance standards. The company confirmed that the project was nearing completion in late 2025, ahead of formal handover to Remo Stars Football Club management.

In 2026, the hybrid pitch installed at the stadium achieved FIFA Quality Certification, becoming the first football pitch in Nigeria to receive the accreditation. The certification followed rigorous testing for durability, ball roll, safety, and overall playing performance in accordance with FIFA standards.

Monimichelle Sports, based in Yenagoa, Bayelsa State, has been involved in multiple sports infrastructure projects across Nigeria, including stadium construction, turf installation, and maintenance services for professional sporting facilities.
