= Umuahia Township Stadium =

Sports venue in Umuahia, Nigeria

Coordinates: 5°31′27″N 7°29′48.5″E

- Interactive map of Umuahia Township Stadium
- Address: Umuahia; Nigeria
- Owner: Abia State Government
- Parking: 5,000

Tenant
- Abia Warriors F.C.

The Umuahia Township Stadium is a stadium in Umuahia Nigeria and the home ground of Abia Warriors F.C. of the Nigeria Premier League. Abia Comets F.C. also play their home games on the pitch. Capacity of the stadium is 5,000.
