= MKO Abiola Stadium =

Multi-use stadium in Abeokuta, Nigeria

Coordinates: 7°7′57″N 3°21′19″E

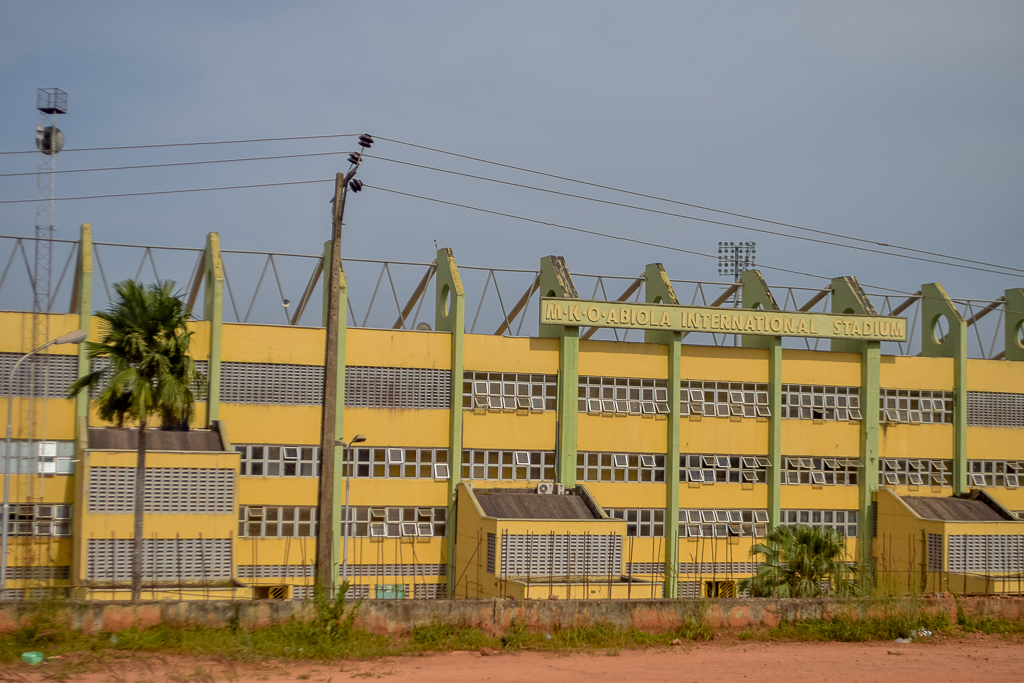
- Interactive map of MKO Abiola Stadium
- Full name: MKO Abiola International Stadium
- Location: Abeokuta
- Capacity: 10,000
- Surface: Grass

Tenant
- Gateway United

MKO Abiola Stadium is a multi-use stadium in Abeokuta, Nigeria. It is currently used mostly for football matches and is the home stadium of Gateway F.C. and Abeokuta Stormers SC. The stadium has a capacity of 10,000 people.

== Name ==
The stadium's name refers to Moshood Kashimawo Olawale Abiola a businessman, publisher, politician and aristocrat of Abeokuta, Ogun State.
