= Nnamdi Azikiwe Stadium =

Sports venue in Enugu, Nigeria

- The Cathedral
- Interactive map of Nnamdi Azikiwe Stadium
- Address: Ogui Road; Enugu; Nigeria
- Coordinates: 6.4443°N 7.4965°E
- Capacity: 22,000

Construction
- Opened: 1959
- Renovated: 1970

Tenants
- Enugu Rangers

Nnamdi Azikiwe Stadium nicknamed The Cathedral is a multi-purpose stadium in Enugu, Nigeria. It is currently used mostly for football matches and is the home stadium of Enugu Rangers. The stadium has a capacity of 22,000 and it was named after the first president of the Republic of Nigeria, Nnamdi Azikiwe. He served as the first president of Nigeria in the 1960s.

== History ==
Nnamdi Azikiwe Stadium used to belong to the Nigerian Railway Corporation (NRC). Until then it was the most flamboyant playing facility in Enugu.

As far back as 1959, the facility was the sports ground of the corporation, the Eastern District. This is not surprising as the corporation was in the forefront of the promotion of sports during and even after the colonial era. As time went on, apparently because of its strategic location right at the heart of Enugu, the defunct Eastern Nigeria Government took over the management of the venue and raised its profile.

The stadium continued to serve as the rallying point for sportsmen and women residents in the eastern region, until the outbreak of the Nigeria/Biafra civil war. It was refurbished after the civil war with hostel facilities to accommodate athletes. It also housed the state's sports council.

Rangers International of Enugu were also founded at the time and made the stadium their home base. The image of Rangers loomed large in the 1970s, particularly because of the impressive results they posted shortly after forming.

There was, thereafter, clamour to rebuild the facility. This led to teamed efforts by the then old Anambra State Government in partnership with the private sector to raise funds for the rebuilding of the stadium, which was inaugurated in 1986.

Thirteen years after, the stadium was refurbished again to pave way for the staging of the FIFA U-20 World Cup Nigeria 1999. It staged important matches including Nigeria's loss to Mali in the quarter-finals.

The stadium, which previously had natural grass, now has an artificial turf and a new videomatrix scoreboard. These, and other refurbishing works, were designed to give the stadium a more modern and technologically driven edifice because it was one of the hosting stadiums of FIFA U-17 World Cup Nigeria 2009. The Nnamdi Azikiwe Stadium hosted matches in Group D, which comprised Turkey, Costa Rica, Burkina Faso and New Zealand at the FIFA U-17 World Cup Nigeria 2009.

On matchday 35 of the 2023-24 edition of the NPFL, 44,000 people crammed into the Nnamdi Azikiwe Stadium for a match between the Enugu Rangers and rivals Enyimba FC. It was the best-attended match in the NPFL during that football season. During that NPFL season, the Enugu Rangers drew an average home attendance of 20,672. It was the highest average home attendance in the league.

== Notable football tournaments ==
=== 1999 FIFA World Youth Championship ===
| Date | Team 1 | Result | Team 2 | Attendance | Round |
|---|---|---|---|---|---|
| 5 April 1999 | Uruguay | 1–2 | Mali | 16,000 | Group D |
| 5 April 1999 | South Korea | 1–3 | Portugal | 10,000 | Group D |
| 8 April 1999 | Uruguay | 1–0 | South Korea | 6,000 | Group D |
| 8 April 1999 | Mali | 2–1 | Portugal | 6,000 | Group D |
| 11 April 1999 | Uruguay | 0–0 | Portugal | 4,000 | Group D |
| 11 April 1999 | Mali | 2–4 | South Korea | 4,000 | Group D |
| 15 April 1999 | Mali | 5–4 (a.e.t.) | Cameroon | 4,000 | Round of 16 |
| 18 April 1999 | Mali | 3–1 | Nigeria | 22,000 | Quarter-final |

=== 2009 FIFA U-17 World Cup ===
| Date | Team 1 | Result | Team 2 | Attendance | Round |
|---|---|---|---|---|---|
| 25 October 2009 | Turkey | 1–0 | Burkina Faso | 12,350 | Group D |
| 25 October 2009 | Costa Rica | 1–1 | New Zealand | 16,850 | Group D |
| 28 October 2009 | New Zealand | 1–1 | Burkina Faso | 10,195 | Group D |
| 29 October 2009 | Turkey | 4–1 | Costa Rica | 5,632 | Group D |
| 31 October 2009 | Netherlands | 0–1 | Iran | 7,461 | Group C |
| 31 October 2009 | Burkina Faso | 4–1 | Costa Rica | 11,483 | Group D |
| 4 November 2009 | Turkey | 2–0 | United Arab Emirates | 16,782 | Round of 16 |
