= Dakkada F.C. =

Nigerian football club

- Full name: Dakkada Football Club
- Founded: 2004; 22 years ago
- Stadium: Godswill Akpabio International Stadium
- Capacity: 30,000
- Owner: Government of Akwa Ibom State
- Chairman: Aniedi Dickson
- Head Coach: Umar Danlami Kwasau
- League: Nigeria National League
- 2022–23: Nigerian Professional Football League, 10th of 10th

Dakkada Football Club (formerly Akwa Starlets Football Club) is a Nigerian football club. They played in the Nigerian Professional Football League after gaining promotion from the Nigeria National League on 22 July 2019. In May 2023, the club was relegated to the Nigeria National League.

== History ==
Dakkada FC was founded as Akwa Starlets FC in 2004 by the Akwa Ibom State Government through the then Commissioner for Youths and Sports Chris Ekong as the junior team of Akwa United FC. When Dakkada FC was formed they first played in the Nigerian National Amateur League 1 and gradually gained promotions. In September 2019, Akwa Starlet was crowned the 2019 Champion of the Nigeria National League. On the 31st of October 2019, the club management officially re-branded the club, changing its name from Akwa Starlet FC to Dakkada FC. Dakkada FC is located in Uyo, Akwa Ibom state. Their home stadium is the Godswill Akpabio International Stadium.

In 2019, they were promoted to play in the 2019–2020 season of the Nigerian tier-1 club competition, the Nigerian Professional Football League.

In May 2023, after four years in the Nigeria Professional Football League, the club was relegated to the Nigeria National League. According to Nigeria Sports News, the team relegated as a result of "poor recruitment".

== Achievements ==
- Second Division: Winners(1)

2019

== Current squad ==
As of 30 December 2020

Note: Flags indicate national team as defined under FIFA eligibility rules; some limited exceptions apply. Players may hold more than one non-FIFA nationality.

No.	Pos.	Nation	Player
1	GK	NGR	Adewale Oramade
3	DF	NGR	Ubong Williams
6	MF	NGR	Isaac George
8	DF	NGR	Arinze Abuka
9		NGR	Phillip Archibong
10	FW	NGR	Aniekan Ekpe
12	FW	NGR	Adamu Yazid
13	GK	NGR	Thomas Omokhudu
14		NGR	Ibrahim Abiola
15	DF	NGR	Olawale Doyeri
18		NGR	Godwin Inamoto

No.	Pos.	Nation	Player
19		NGR	Ubong Idio
21		NGR	Peter Eletu
23	MF	NGR	Muritala Lawal
24		NGR	Samuel Akpan
25		NGR	Unwana Asuquo
26		NGR	Solomon Chigozie
28	DF	NGR	Francis Odinaka
29		NGR	Ukeme Umoh
30	DF	NGR	Christian Ekong
34		NGR	Emmanuel Charles
40	MF	NGR	Afeez Awakan
