= Crown F.C. =

Nigerian football club

Crown
- Full name: Crown Football Club
- Nickname: Ajilete Boys
- Founded: 1994
- Ground: Lekan Salami Stadium
- Capacity: 10,000
- Chairman: Mallam Bello Noah
- Manager: Oladunni Oyekale
- League: Nigeria National League
- Website: www.facebook.com/CrownFootballClubogbomoso
Home colours	Away colours

Crown Football Club is a Nigerian professional association football club based in Ogbomosho, Oyo State, that competes in the Nigeria National League. The club plays at the Lekan Salami Stadium, with a capacity of 10,000. For the 2010–11 season they played some games at the Ilaro Stadium in nearby Ogun State and returned in 2012/2013 to the Soun Stadium.

== History ==
They were founded in 1994 by Rev. Prof. Yusuf Ameh Obaje, a college professor, pastor and former chaplain to Olusegun Obasanjo. Their main rivals are Oyo neighbours Shooting Stars F.C. of Ibadan. Games between the two became fierce during 3SC's relegation to the Nigeria National League in 2006. In thirteen total meetings up to 2011, 3SC held a 9–2–2 advantage. Crown achieved promotion to the Premier League for the first time after finishing on top of the 2010 Division 1B. They were relegated back to the National League after one season and only eleven wins.

They spent two seasons at the lower level before clinching promotion on the final day of the 2013 season with a 1–0 home win over Fountain FC, finishing with a record of 14 wins 2 draws and ten losses.

== Achievements ==
- Nigeria National League: 1

2009-10

== Notable players ==
- (Nigeria) Alexander Olasumbo Lawal
- (Nigeria) Ibrahim Obayomi
- (Nigeria) Abdulwaheed Afolabi
- (Nigeria) Peter Godly Michael
