= Gateway United F.C. =

Nigerian football club

Gateway FC
- Full name: Gateway United Football Club
- Nickname: Rock City Boys
- Founded: 1998; 28 years ago
- Ground: MKO Abiola Stadium, Abeokuta
- Capacity: 10,000
- Manager: Hakeem Busari
- Coach: Jeremiah Ayodele
- League: Nigeria National League
- 2016–17: 2
Home colours	Away colours

Gateway United FC is a football club based in Abeokuta, Ogun State. They play in the second division of the Nigeria league system (Nigeria National League).

They play their home matches at the MKO Abiola Stadium, Abeokuta.

== Former coaches ==
- Loveday Omoruyi
- Ogunbote Ayodeji
- Philip Boamah
- Henry Nwosu
- Olabode Awakan
- Samuel Abimbola

== Current team ==
As of May 2018

Note: Flags indicate national team as defined under FIFA eligibility rules; some limited exceptions apply. Players may hold more than one non-FIFA nationality.

No.	Pos.	Nation	Player
1	GK	NGA	Ibunkun Araromi
2	Df	NGA	Taiye Muritala
4		NGA	Ibrahim Abdullahi
5		NGA	Mannir Ubale
10	FW	CMR	Fabassou Djoufoune
11		NGA	Sani Abbani
14		NGA	Usman Suleiman
15		NGA	Samuel Agba
16		NGA	Alhassan Yusuf
17		NGA	Chidera Ejike
18		NGA	Akeem Balogun

No.	Pos.	Nation	Player
19		NGA	Franklin Matibuze
20	DF	NGA	Maurice Chigozie
22		NGA	Amosu Emmanuel
24		NGA	Ola Ogundele
25	DF	NGA	Isaac Giwa
26		NGA	Austin Oladapo
27	GK	BEN	Emmanuel Fabiyi
28		NGA	Saleh Mohammed
29	DM	NGA	James Oronsaye
30		NGA	Uche Owasanya
32		NGA	Abiola Babatunde
34		NGA	Bilya Yarma
35		NGA	Bala Mohammed
—	MF	NGA	Mathias Samuel
