= Mighty Jets F.C. =

Association football club in Nigeria

Mighty Jets International
- Full name: Mighty Jets International Football Club
- Nickname: The Jets
- Founded: 1970; 56 years ago
- Ground: Jos International Stadium; Jos, Nigeria
- Capacity: 60,000
- President: Alhaji Ismaila Mabo
- Chairman: Mbum Ferdinand
- League: Nigeria National League
- 2020/21: 5th
- Website: mightyjetsfcjos.com
Home colours

Mighty Jets International FC is a Nigerian professional football club based in Jos, playing in the Nigeria National League. They play their home games at the Jos International Stadium, which has a capacity of 45,000.

== History ==
They are one of only a half dozen active 'privately owned' (not owned by state governments) professional clubs in Nigeria.

They were the winners of the Nigerian League in 1972. They played at the top level until 1985.

Jets also have the record for losing the most FA Cup finals, losing 10 finals they have played in while winning none. They came close in the 1972 final, where they lost the replay 3–2 to Bendel Insurance after tying the first match 2–2 after a late goal from Sam Garba Okoye. Jets also lost the 1974 cup final 2–0 to Enugu Rangers.

Jets were demoted to the third division in 1994, spending three seasons there before being promoted back to the second division in 1997. The Jets' last time in the Premier League was a one-year stint in 2004. They finished at the bottom of the 18-team table with 28 points (7 wins, 7 ties and 20 losses) and then lost a promotion playoff against rivals Wikki Tourists when the league expanded to 20 teams. The season was worsened by their banishment to Owerri the last half of the season after crowd trouble. With a new board of directors in place in 2016, the club is targeting promotion to the Nigeria Premier League. Some of Mighty Jets former players now play in the Nigeria Premier League.

== Achievements ==
- Nigerian Premier League
  - Champions (1): 1972
- National Second Division
  - Champions (1): 2003

== Performance in CAF competitions ==
- African Cup of Champions Clubs: 1 appearance

1973: Second Round

- CAF Cup Winners' Cup: 1 appearance

1975 – First Round

== Current players ==
Note: Flags indicate national team as defined under FIFA eligibility rules; some limited exceptions apply. Players may hold more than one non-FIFA nationality.

No.	Pos.	Nation	Player
2			Steven Rabwo
3			Thomas Azi
4			Saleh Hamisu
5			Umaru Mohammed
7			Alkassim Mohammed
8		NGA	Echendu Emmanuel Echendu
9			Danjuma Abdulahi
10			Umar Mohamed
11			Uche Illo
12			Godwin Micheal
13			Ismail Musa
14			Cletus Nkenjika

No.	Pos.	Nation	Player
15			Peter Nmoh
16			Chizoba Illodigwe
17			Seth Maji
18			Ogada Chibuzor Christain
20			Shola Olariyi
22	GK		Musa Gyanga
23			Sanni Abdulrazaq
26	FW	NGA	Justice Fan
30			Sanni Ishiaku
35			Williams Abba
37			Sani Abdulahi
39			Pius Udoh
38			Yusuf Ajifowowe
