= Calabar Rovers F.C. =

Nigerian football club

Calabar Rovers
- Full name: Calabar Rovers Football Club
- Founded: 1976 (reestablished 2008)
- Ground: U. J. Esuene Stadium
- Capacity: 25,000
- Chairman: Maurice Inok
- League: Nigeria National League
Home colours

Calabar Rovers Football Club is a Nigerian football club based in Calabar. They play their games at U. J. Esuene Stadium.

== History ==
The club was founded in 1976. They were one of the original members of the Nigerian Second Division which was established in 1979. Under Brazilian coach Paulo Luiz Campos, they adopted a fast-paced style and were promoted after finishing second in 1981.

They stayed in the top flight for about a decade before being relegated to the lower leagues in 1993. During that time, they made the semifinals of the FA Cup twice but never won any major accolades. Their last game however was the controversial 13–0 loss to Akwa United on August 12, 2006. Already doomed to relegation to the Nigeria Amateur League, Rovers had three players sent off in the blowout which allowed Akwa to be promoted to the Premier League by a goal differential of one. Rovers, on the other hand, disbanded after the game.

=== Return to Nigerian League ===
In May 2008, the Cross River State government announced plans to bring the team back from hiatus and with corporate sponsorship. With the help of United Cement Company (UNICEM), they entered into a player share agreement with newly promoted Dankat FC of Kano for 12 million naira, and will play in the Nigeria National League in 2008–09. Since the team also acquired Dankat's league slot, they played their first season back in the mostly-northern division A. The team was run for the next five seasons by UNICEM. For part of the 2009 season they played at the Uyo Township Stadium while Esuene stadium was renovated for the 2009 FIFA U-17 World Cup.

== Managers ==
- Dorian Marin (2017–19)
- Bob Osim (2019–?)
- Christian Okonkwo (2025–26)
