= Onikan Stadium =

Sports venue in Lagos, Nigeria

Coordinates: 6°26′33″N 3°24′8″E

Mobolaji Johnson Arena
- Onikan Stadium
- Interactive map of Mobolaji Johnson Arena
- Address: Lagos; Nigeria
- Capacity: 10,000

Construction
- Built: 1930

Tenant
- Sporting Lagos Ikorodu City

The Mobolaji Johnson Arena, previously known as Onikan Stadium, is a multi-purpose stadium in Lagos, Nigeria. It is currently used for football matches and is the home stadium of 1472 F.C, First Bank F.C, Ikorodu City F.C, Inter Lagos, Julius Berger F.C, Prince Kazeem Eleku F.C, Smart City F.C, Sporting Lagos, Stationery Stores F.C. and Valiant F.C.

The Mobolaji Johnson Arena has a capacity of 10,000 people and is the oldest in Nigeria. Located on the southeastern corner of Lagos Island near Tafewa Balewa Square, the original stadium was built in 1930 and six years later named after King George V. Between 1963 and 1973, it became known as the Lagos City Stadium. The current Onikan Stadium was renovated and reopened for football and cultural activities in the 1980s. In March 2008, the stadium was banned for use for the rest of the season by the Nigeria Football League when a pitch invasion injured many members of the Warri Wolves after a scoreless draw with First Bank.

In 2019, it was renamed by the Lagos state government, from Onikan Stadium to Mobolaji Johnson Arena.

On 1 October 2025, Nigeria Independence Day, Amir Khan Promotions held a boxing event at this stadium. It was headlined by Marcus Browne and Brandon Glanton and featured other well-known boxers.

== See also ==
- List of football stadiums in Nigeria
- Lists of stadiums
