= Kwara State Stadium =

Stadium in Ilorin, Nigeria

Coordinates: 8°28′30″N 4°32′34″E

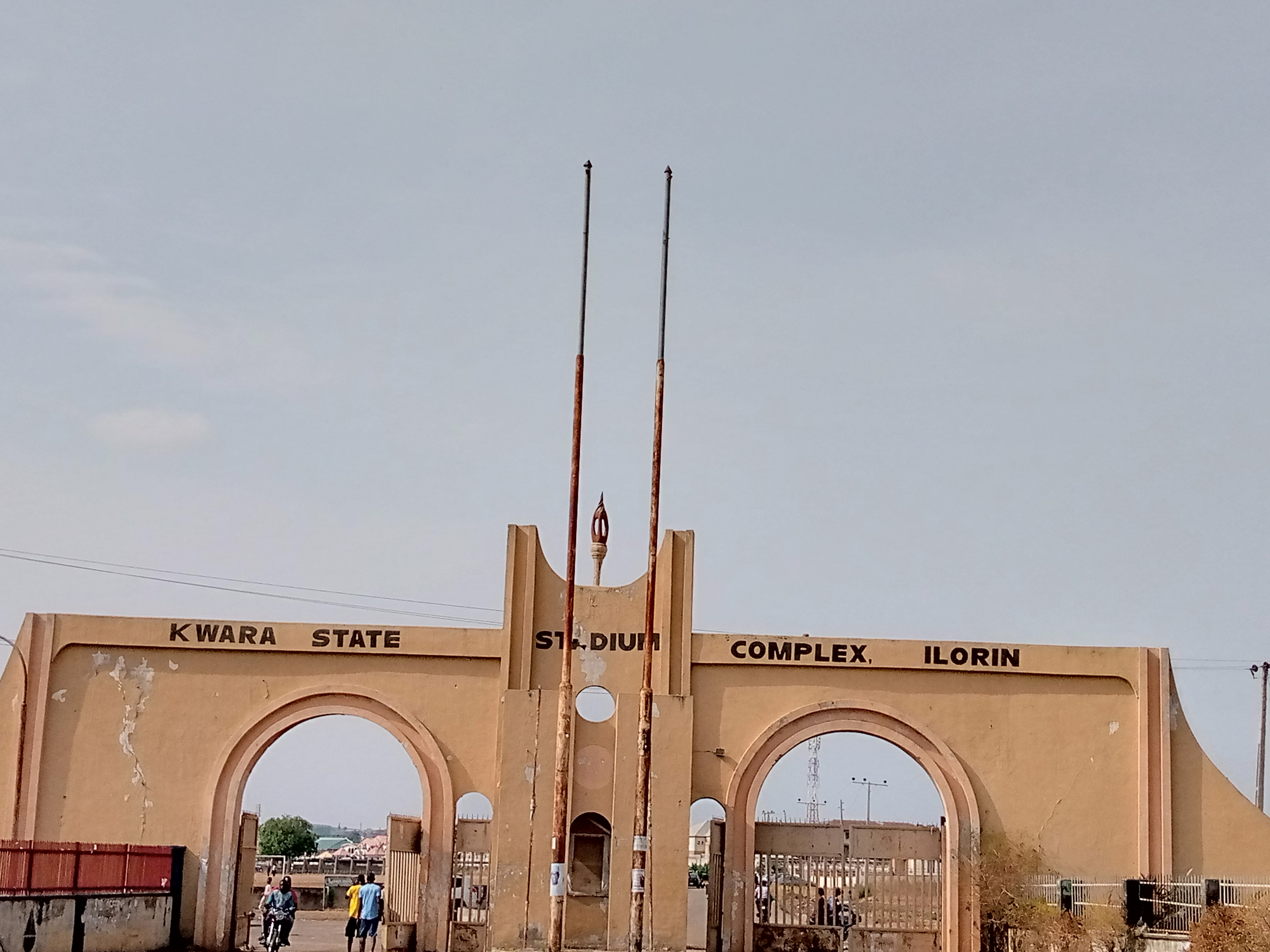
- The stadium entrance
- Interactive map of Kwara State Stadium
- Address: Ilorin; Nigeria
- Owner: Kwara State Government
- Capacity: 18,000

Tenant
- Kwara United F.C.

The Kwara State Stadium is a multi-use stadium in Ilorin, Kwara, Nigeria. It is currently used mostly for football matches and is the home stadium of Kwara United F.C. and ABS FC The stadium has a capacity of 18,000 after renovation work that started in 2010. It is located on Stadium road, off Ibrahim Taiwo road.

== History ==
The stadium was constructed by the Military Administrator of the state, retired Brig. George Innih, in 1977.

On December 9, 2021, the Nigerian Professional Football League (NPFL) banned the stadium for its games after it failed an integrity test involving the dressing rooms, toilets, television, camera stands, and electronic scoreboard. The ban was reviewed and subsequently lifted on December 14, 2021, after urgent renovations were made. However, the stadium was unavailable for games that season as the government approved a change of the pitch in a bid to modernise the facility.

Kwara United drew an average home attendance of 5,368 in the 2023–24 Nigeria Premier Football League.

In August 2024, the government undertook repairs and renovations to keep the stadium up to the NPFL standards.

== Use ==
It is mostly used for football matches
