= Uyo Township Stadium =

Sports venue in Nigeria

Coordinates: 5°01′07″N 7°55′31″E

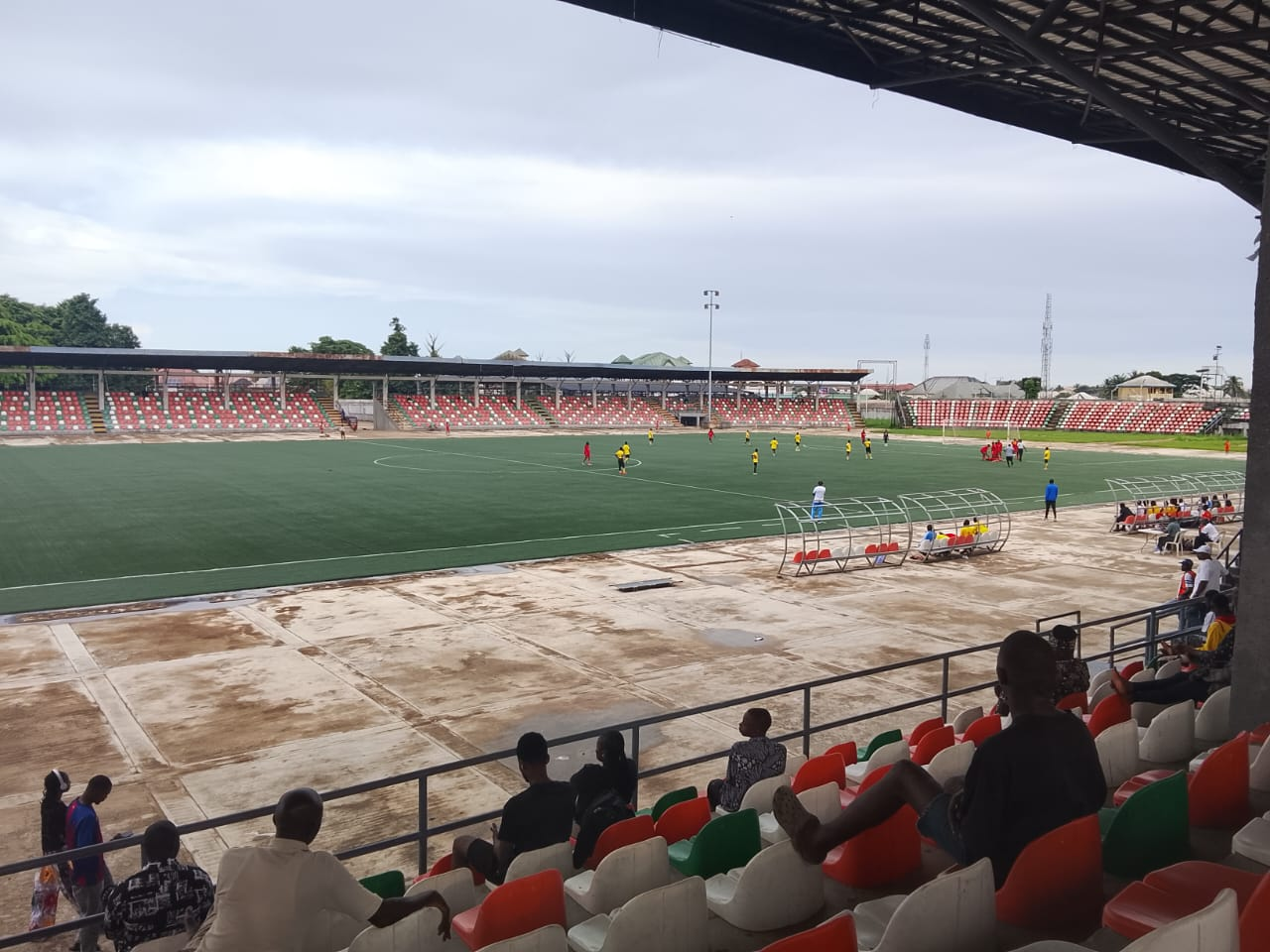
- Interactive map of Uyo Township Stadium
- Full name: Uyo Township Stadium
- Location: Uyo, Akwa Ibom, Nigeria
- Capacity: 5,000 (football)
- Surface: Astro Turf

Construction
- Renovated: 2023

Tenants
- Akwa United F.C. (2014–present); Nigeria national football team (selected matches); Godswill Akpabio United (2024–present)

Uyo Township Stadium is a multi-use stadium located in Uyo, the capital of Akwa Ibom State, Nigeria. It is used mostly for football matches and is the home stadium of Akwa United F.C. of the Nigerian Premier League. It is also a center for social, cultural, political, and religious events. The popular annual Akwa Ibom Christmas Carol, organized by the Akwa Ibom State Government, always holds at the stadium. The stadium is located close to a major market in Uyo City, called Akpan Andem Market. The stadium has a capacity of 5,000 people.

Most local league games and political rallies in Uyo are hosted here.
