= Sokoto United F.C. =

Nigerian football club

Sokoto United is a Nigerian football club based in Sokoto. They play in the second-tier division in Nigerian football, the Nigeria National League. (Giginya Memorial Stadium) is their home. It has capacity for 5,000 people.

The club plays in the Nigerian second tier division Nigerian National League NNL as of January 2025. The current technical adviser is Peter Ajeni, who succeeded Mansur Abdullahi.
