= Nigerian football league system =

Series of interconnected leagues

- Country: Nigeria
- Sport: Association football
- Promotion and relegation: Yes

National system
- Federation: Nigeria Football Federation
- Confederation: CAF
- Top division: Premier Football League
- Second division: National League
- Cup competition: Federation Cup; Super Cup

The Nigerian football league system is a series of interconnected leagues for association football clubs in Nigeria. It is made up of the top-most league, the Nigeria Premier Football League, then the Nigeria National League which is divided into two groups, followed by the Nigeria Nationwide League of 300 clubs which is divided hierarchically into the Nigeria Nationwide League Division One, the Nigeria Nationwide League Division Two and the Nigeria Nationwide League Division Three consisting competitions divided in geographical zones with the Division One and Two having 4 zones and 8 in Division Three. Promotion and relegation from Nigeria Nationwide League Division Three is done with local and state amateur leagues considered as Non-League football and is required for the promoted clubs to maintain their registration in their leagues to participate at the Division Three, remaining the originally relegated teams despite their stands on the League table if this requirement is not fulfilled.

== Structure ==
Level	League
1	Nigeria Premier Football League; 20 clubs ↓relegate 4 teams
2	Nigeria National League; 36 clubs ↑↓promote 4 teams, relegate as many as 12 teams
3	Nigeria Nationwide Leagues as many as 40clubs ↑↓promote as many as 12 teams
