= Osun United F.C. =

Nigerian football club

Osun United FC, Osogbo
- Full name: Osun United Football Club
- Nicknames: Pride of Osogbo; Omoluabi Giants
- Founded: 1996
- Ground: Oshogbo Stadium; Oshogbo, Osun State, Nigeria
- Capacity: 10,000
- Chairman: Akin Maxwell
- Manager: Seye Ajayi
- League: Nigeria National League
| Home colours | Away colours | Third colours |

Osun United FC is a Nigerian professional football club, based in the town of Osogbo, in Osun State. The club is also nicknamed Omoluabi Giants.

== History ==
Prime FC was founded 1996 by authorities of Osogbo Local Government and play its home games in the 10,000 seater Oshogbo Stadium. They play in the second level of professional football in Nigeria, the Nigeria National League after relegation from the Nigeria Premier League in 2008. The club was renamed "Osun United" in January 2017 to give the club a better identity. In the present 2023/2024 Season, Osun Utd leads the Southern Conference B with 26 points from 15 matches. Please refer to the social media account of the club for latest happenings

== Former managers ==
- Samson Unuanel (2006)
- Coach Atia (2007)
- Coach Osama (2008)
- Yekeen Ayodeji (2010)
- Ademola Adesina (2012)
- Samuel Abimbola (2013)
- Shina Afolabi (2014)
- Duke Udi (2017)
- Bayo Adesina (2018)
- Duke Udi (2019)
- Samson Unuanel (2020)
- Bright Omokaro (2021)
- Tunji Baruwa (2022)
- Seye Ajayi (2023–)

== Notable players ==
- Dare Ojo
- Odion Ighalo
- Osas Saha
