= Yobe Desert Stars F.C. =

Football club in Nigeria

Yobe Desert Stars
- Full name: Yobe Desert Stars Football Club
- Founded: 1991
- Ground: Potiskum Stadium, Damaturu
- Capacity: 2,000
- Owner: Yobe State Government
- Chairman: Isa Wudil
- Manager: Dikko Suleja
- League: Nigeria National League
- 2017 Nigeria National League: 2nd (Promoted)
Home colours	Away colours

Yobe Desert Stars Football Club is a Nigerian football (soccer) club based in the city of Damaturu. Starting in 2018 they will play in the Nigerian Premier League after consecutive promotions.

== History ==
They started as an Amateur club and eventually were promoted to the Second Division in 2000. After winning promotion to the top level in 2001, they spent just one season in the NPL before being relegated with just 11 wins in 34 games. They also made it to the final of the 2002 Nigerian FA Cup where they lost 3–0 to Julius Berger FC. They were relegated to the Amateur League in 2007.

== 2017 season ==
After being promoted from the Nigeria Nationwide League in 2016, the Desert Stars won promotion to the NPFL on the last day of the National League season when they beat Adamawa United 2–0, returning to the top-flight for the first time in 15 years. They finished the season with twelve wins, four draws and seven losses.

== Current squad ==
As of January 2018

Note: Flags indicate national team as defined under FIFA eligibility rules; some limited exceptions apply. Players may hold more than one non-FIFA nationality.

No.	Pos.	Nation	Player
1	GK	NGA	Ahmed Yusuf
30	GK	NGA	Itodo Akor
2		NGA	Moses Yanmar
7		NGA	Shagari Muhammad
8		NGA	Ikekhai Sebastian Sunday
9		NGA	Edward Okhoya
11		NGA	Ali Aliyu
12		NGA	Philip Asuquo
13		NGA	Bagayan Ismael
14		NGA	Philip Auta
17		NGA	Buhari Musa
19		NGA	Manika Usman

No.	Pos.	Nation	Player
23		NGA	Matthew Oshoke
24		NGA	Moses Tsehuan
25		NGA	Mustapha Musa
33		NGA	Mukaila Musa
34		KEN	Kiti Patrick Nyale
35		NGA	Bashir Azado
40		NGA	Mamman Sani
—		NGA	Chinedu Ohanacham
—		NGA	Echendu Osita
—		NGA	Lazarus Chukwu
—		NGA	Zayyad Musa
—		NGA	Paul Alfred

Coach: Mohammed Baba Ganaru
