= Gombe United F.C. =

Nigerian football club

- Nickname: Savannah scorpions
- Founded: 1990; 36 years ago
- Ground: Pantami Stadium; Gombe, Nigeria
- Capacity: 12,000
- League: Nigeria Professional Football League
- 2023–24: 20th (Relegated)
Home colours	Away colours

Gombe United Football Club is a Nigerian football club based in Gombe. They play in the Nigeria Professional Football League. Their home stadium is the new Pantami Stadium, having moved from Abubakar Umar Memorial Stadium in 2010.

== History ==
Founded in 1990, they continuously remained in the Nigerian top flight since promotion in 1994 until 2014, the longest tenure of any Northern team. They however were relegated on the last day in the 2014 season to the Nigeria National League for the first time in 20 years. They won promotion back to the top level on the last day of the 2016 season by winning their division. They were again relegated in 2019.

== Achievements ==
- Nigerian Premier League: 0

2007 Runners-up, Super 4 Playoffs

== Performance in CAF competitions ==
- CAF Champions League: 1 appearance

2008 – First Round

- West African Club Championship (UFOA Cup): 1 appearance

2009 – Second Round
