= List of football stadiums in Nigeria =

The following is a list of football stadiums in Nigeria by capacity. It also includes the current team in each stadium. The Mobolaji Johnson Arena in Lagos is the oldest stadium in Nigeria.

== Current stadiums ==
#	Image	Stadium	Capacity	City	State	Home team(s)	Opened	Ref
1		Moshood Abiola National Stadium	60,491	Abuja	FCT	Nigeria national football team	2003	
2		Jos International Stadium	60,000	Jos	Plateau			
3	Main-bowl-national-stadium-surulere-lagos	Lagos National Stadium	45,000	Lagos	Lagos	Cowrie Rugby Football Club	1972	
4		Adokiye Amiesimaka Stadium	38,000	Port Harcourt	Rivers		2015	
5		Muhammadu Dikko Stadium	35,000	Katsina	Katsina	Katsina United F.C.	2013	
6		Godswill Akpabio International Stadium	30,000	Uyo	Akwa Ibom	Akwa United	2014	
7		Rojenny International Stadium	30,000	Oba	Anambra			
8		Confluence Stadium	25,000	Lokoja	Kogi			
9	Ibadan_stadium,_Ibadan2	Obafemi Awolowo Stadium	25,000	Ibadan	Oyo			
10		Teslim Balogun Stadium	24,325	Surulere	Lagos	First Bank F.C.	2007	
11		Nnamdi Azikiwe Stadium	22,000	Enugu	Enugu	Enugu Rangers		
12		Stephen Keshi Stadium	22,000	Asaba	Delta		2018	
13		Gateway Stadium	20,000	Ijebu-Ode	Ogun	FC Ebedei		
14		Warri Township Stadium	20,000	Warri	Delta	Warri Wolves F.C.		
15	Kwara_State_Stadium_entrance_2	Kwara State Stadium	18,000	Ilorin	Kwara	Kwara United F.C. ABS FC		
16		Ahmadu Bello Stadium	16,000	Kaduna	Kaduna		1965	
17		Enyimba International Stadium	16,000	Aba	Abia	Enyimba International F.C.	1992	
18		Liberation Stadium	16,000	Port Harcourt	Rivers	Dolphins F.C.		
19		Sani Abacha Stadium	16,000	Kano	Kano	Kano Pillars F.C.	1998	
20		UJ Esuene Stadium	16,000	Calabar	Cross River	Calabar Rovers	1977	
21		Abubakar Tafawa Balewa Stadium	15,000	Bauchi	Bauchi	Wikki Tourists		
22		Rwang Pam Stadium	15,000	Jos	Plateau	Plateau United; JUTH F.C. Mighty Jets		
23		Samuel Ogbemudia Stadium	12,000	Benin City	Edo	Bendel Insurance F.C.	1983	
24		Pantami Stadium	12,000		Gombe	Gombe United F.C.		
25		Jalingo City Stadium	12,000	Jalingo	Taraba	Taraba FC	2002	
26		Ilaro Stadium	12,000	Ilaro	Ogun	Gateway United F.C.	2008	
27		Abubakar Umar Memorial Stadium	10,000	Gombe	Gombe	Gombe United F.C.		
28		Dan Anyiam Stadium	10,000		Imo	Heartland F.C.		
29		Delta State Polytechnic Ozoro Stadium	16,000	Ozoro	Delta			
30		El-Kanemi Stadium	10,000	Owerri	Borno	El-Kanemi Warriors		
31		FC Ifeanyi Ubah International Stadium	10,000		Anambra	Ifeanyi Ubah F.C.		
32		Lekan Salami Stadium	10,000	Ibadan	Oyo	Shooting Stars FC		
33		MKO Abiola Stadium	10,000	Abeokuta	Ogun	Gateway United F.C.		
34		Mobolaji Johnson Arena	10,000	Lagos	Lagos	1472 FC; Ikorodu City; Inter Lagos; Robo Queens; Sporting Lagos	1930	
35		Oshogbo Stadium	10,000		Osun	Prime F.C.		
36		Sapele Stadium	10,000	Sapele	Delta	Bayelsa United F.C.		
37		Zaria Township Stadium	10,000		Kaduna	Kaduna United F.C.		
38		Kano Pillars Stadium	10,000	Kano	Kano	Kano Pillars F.C.		
39		Uyo Township Stadium	8,000		Akwa Ibom	Akwa United F.C. Vandrezzer FC		
40		Aper Aku Stadium	8,000	Makurdi	Benue	Lobi Stars		
41		Jay Jay Okocha Stadium	8,000		Delta	Delta Force F.C.		
42		Covenant University Stadium	6,500		Ogun			
43		Akure Township Stadium	5,000	Akure	Ondo	Sunshine Stars F.C.		
44		Ikpeazu Memorial Stadium	5,000		Anambra	Anambra Pillars F.C. Anambra United F.C.	2009	
45		Katsina Township Stadium	5,000		Katsina			
46		Lafia Township Stadium	5,000		Nasarawa	Nasarawa United		
47		Minna Township Stadium	5,000		Niger	Niger Tornadoes		
48		Nsukka Township Stadium	5,000		Enugu			
49		Oghara Township Stadium	5,000		Bayelsa	Ocean Boys F.C. Bayelsa United		
50		Old Parade Ground	5,000		FCT	Abuja F.C.		
51		Oyo Township Stadium	5,000		Oyo	Atiba F.C.		
52		Sardauna Memorial Stadium	5,000	Gusau	Zamfara	Zamfara United F.C.		
53		Ughelli Township Stadium	5,000		Delta	Ughelli Rovers FC	2002	
54		Sharks Stadium	5,000		Rivers	Sharks F.C.		
55		Umuahia Township Stadium	5,000		Abia	Abia Warriors F.C. Abia Comets		
56		Yenagoa Township Stadium	5,000		Bayelsa	Ocean Boys FC; Bayelsa United		
57		Ebedi City Stadium	5,000	Iseyin	Oyo	Iseyin FC		
58		Uniport Sport Arena	5,000	Port Harcourt	Rivers	Rivers Angels		Obio Akpor FC
59		Agege Stadium	4,000		Lagos	MFM FC; Bridge Boys F.C. Pepsi Football Academy		

== Future stadiums ==
Stadium	Capacity	City	Home team	Opening
Abia International Stadium	40,000	Abia State	Abia Warriors	2030
Ebonyi Olympic stadium	35,000	Ebonyi state	National Football team and Abakaliki F.C.	2030
Bayelsa Stadium	25,000	Bayelsa State	National Football Team and Bayelsa United	2027
Yola ultra Modern stadium	20,000	Adamawa state	Adamawa United	2026
Lagos Arena	12,000	Lagos	Nigeria men's national basketball team	2027
Edo Arena	6,000	Benin City	Bendel Insurance F.C.	2025

== See also ==
- List of association football stadiums by capacity
- List of association football stadiums by country
- List of sports venues by capacity
- Lists of stadiums
- Football in Nigeria
