= 2010–11 Nigeria Premier League =

Nigeria Premier League
- Season: 2010–11
- Champions: Dolphins
- Relegated: Plateau United, Zamfara United, Crown F.C., JUTH F.C.
- 2012 CAF Champions League: Dolphins; Sunshine Stars
- 2012 CAF Confederation Cup: Warri Wolves; Heartland (cup winner)
- Matches: 380
- Goals: 786 (2.07 per match)
- Top goalscorer: Jude Aneke - Kaduna United (20)
- Biggest home win: Plateau United 7-0 vs Kwara United (23 Oct. 2011)
- Biggest away win: Kwara United 2-0 at JUTH (11 Dec. 2010); Sharks F.C. 3-1 at Crown F.C. (2 November 2011)
- Highest scoring: Enugu Rangers 5, Ocean Boys 2 (21 Nov. 2010); Sharks 4, Crown 3 (26 Feb. 2011); Plateau United 7-0 vs Kwara United (23 Oct. 2011)
- Longest winning run: Dolphins - 5 games from 22 Dec. 2010 to 22 Jan. 2011
- Longest unbeaten run: 8 games: Bukola Babes (6 wins, 2 ties) from 22 Dec. to 16 Feb.
- Longest winless run: 9 games: Plateau United (3 ties, 6 losses) from 23 Dec. to 20 Feb.
- Longest losing run: Crown - 5 games from 22 Dec. to 23 Jan.
- Highest attendance: 26,000: Enyimba at K. Pillars; 11 Dec. 2010

The 2010–11 Nigeria Premier League was the 40th season of the competition since its inception, and the 21st since the rebranding of the league as the "Professional League". Enyimba International were the defending champions.

The season was originally supposed to start 25 September, then was delayed to 2 October. However after a series of meetings and threatened lawsuits, the league announced that it would play with 24 teams, including the four teams relegated from the previous season. The tentative compromise plans included two divisions of 12 teams each with the top two making the season-ending Super Four, mirroring the league's format in the 2006 and 2007 seasons. This idea was canceled by the NPL on October 7 and the league returned to 20 teams for the season.

The season was delayed again to start the weekend of 23 October, and delayed yet again to 6 November because of issues with the assignment of referees. Due to enforcement of minimum pitch standards, several teams have been made to play in different stadiums outside their home cities.

The second half of the season began 11 May after a six-week break, including two delays for national elections. The season was finished on 13 November 2011 after another six-week delay to allow for the Federation Cup and teams playing on the continent to concentrate on their fixtures.

== Clubs ==
Locations of the Nigeria Premier League 2010–11 teams

Team name	Home city	Home venue	First year of current stint in League
Bukola Babes	Ilorin	Kwara State Stadium/Tafawa Balewa Stadium	2010
Crown FC	Ogbomosho	Ilaro Stadium	2010
Dolphins	Port Harcourt	Liberation Stadium	2009
Enugu Rangers	Enugu	Nnamdi Azikiwe Stadium	1973
Enyimba	Aba	Enyimba International Stadium	1994
Gombe United	Gombe	Abubarkar Tafawa Balewa Stadium/Pantami Stadium	1994
Heartland	Owerri	Dan Anyiam Stadium/U.J. Esuene Stadium	1975
JUTH F.C.	Jos	Rwang Pam Stadium/Kaduna Township Stadium	2010
Kaduna United	Kaduna	Kaduna Township Stadium	2008
Kano Pillars	Kano	Sani Abacha Stadium	2001
Kwara United	Ilorin	Kwara State Stadium/Offa Stadium/MKO Abiola Stadium	2009
Lobi Stars	Makurdi	Jalingo City Stadium/Aper Aku Stadium	1999
Niger Tornadoes	Minna	Minna Township Stadium	2003
Ocean Boys	Brass	Samson Siasia Stadium	2006
Plateau United	Jos	Rwang Pam Stadium/Nnamdi Azikiwe Stadium	2010
Sharks	Port Harcourt	Sharks Stadium	2008
Shooting Stars	Ibadan	MKO Abiola Stadium/Liberty Stadium	2009
Sunshine Stars	Akure	Gateway Stadium (Ijebu Ode)	2007
Warri Wolves	Warri	Warri Township Stadium	2008
Zamfara United	Gusau	Sardauna Memorial Stadium/Sani Abacha Stadium	2007

=== League table ===
Pos	Team	Pld	W	D	L	GF	GA	GD	Pts	Qualification or relegation
1	Dolphins (C)	38	23	4	11	49	30	+19	73	Qualification for 2012 CAF Champions League
2	Sunshine Stars	38	22	5	11	55	35	+20	71	Qualification for 2012 CAF Champions League
3	Warri Wolves	38	19	9	10	44	29	+15	66	Qualification for 2012 CAF Confederation Cup
4	Kano Pillars	38	20	5	13	46	31	+15	65	Qualification for WAFU Club Championship
5	Sharks	38	17	12	9	43	37	+6	63	
6	Enugu Rangers	38	19	5	14	47	30	+17	62	
7	Enyimba	38	19	4	15	44	28	+16	61	
8	Kaduna United	38	16	8	14	42	40	+2	56	
9	Kwara United	38	16	5	17	40	45	−5	53	
10	Lobi Stars	38	15	8	15	34	40	−6	53	
11	Heartland	38	16	4	18	39	35	+4	52	Qualification for 2012 CAF Confederation Cup
12	Bukola Babes	38	15	6	17	35	37	−2	51	
13	Gombe United	38	14	8	16	34	37	−3	50	
14	Niger Tornadoes	38	13	11	14	35	43	−8	50	
15	Shooting Stars	38	13	8	17	34	39	−5	47	
16	Ocean Boys	38	13	8	17	37	44	−7	47	
17	Plateau United (R)	38	12	8	18	42	49	−7	44	Relegated to Nigeria National League
18	Zamfara United (R)	38	11	6	21	26	58	−32	39	Relegated to Nigeria National League
19	Crown (R)	38	11	4	23	34	48	−14	37	Relegated to Nigeria National League
20	JUTH F.C. (R)	38	8	8	22	26	51	−25	32	Relegated to Nigeria National League

Updated to match(es) played on 13 November 2011. Source: Nigeria Premier League
Rules for classification: 1) points; 2) goal difference; 3) number of goals scored.
(C) Champions; (R) Relegated

=== Personnel and kits ===
Team	Manager	Captain	Kit Makers	Sponsor
Bukola Babes	(Nigeria) Kabiru Sulaiman	(Nigeria) Abubakar Yusuf		
Crown FC	(Nigeria) Oladunni Oyekale	(Nigeria) Johnson Abiodun		
Dolphins	(Nigeria) Stanley Eguma	(Nigeria) Emmanuel Godwin		
Enugu Rangers	(Nigeria) Alphonsus Dike	(Nigeria) Austin Iyangbe		
Enyimba	(Nigeria) Okey Emordi	(Nigeria) Okechukwu Odita	Joma	
Gombe United	(Nigeria) Bernard Ogbe			
Heartland	(Netherlands) Lodewijk de Kruif	(Nigeria) Chinedu Efugh		
JUTH F.C.	(Cameroon) Emmanuel Deutsch			
Kaduna United	(Belgium) Maurice Cooreman	(Nigeria) Papa Idris		
Kano Pillars	(Nigeria) Ladan Bosso			
Kwara United	(Nigeria) Kadiri Ikhana			
Lobi Stars	(Nigeria) John Zaki			
Niger Tornadoes	(Nigeria) Justin Tenger	(Nigeria) Kelvin Njoku		
Ocean Boys	(Nigeria) Samson Unuanel			
Plateau United	(Nigeria) Nduka Ndubuisi	(Nigeria) Ajibade Omolade		
Sharks	(Nigeria) John Obuh	(Nigeria) Odinga Odinga		
Shooting Stars	(Nigeria) Fatai Amoo	(Nigeria) Shakiru Lawal	OWU Sportswear	
Sunshine Stars	(Nigeria) Gbenga Ogunbote	(Nigeria) James Moses		
Warri Wolves	(England) Paul Aigbogun	(Nigeria) Goodluck Nnamadu	Lotto	Oceanic Bank
Zamfara United	(Nigeria) Bello Garba Gusau			

=== News ===
- December 12- Ocean Boys defender Emmanuel Okoli collapsed 39 minutes into a game vs. Niger Tornadoes and died en route to the hospital.
- December 16- The league was named the "MTN Premier League" after the NFF secured sponsorship from the MTN Group. However sponsorship was rescinded January 27 and the bidding was reopened.
- January 8- In Abeokuta, Shooting Stars and Tornadoes played the first night game in Nigeria's top division in twenty-nine years.
- Due to unrest in the city of Jos, on January 13 JUTH announced they were moving home games to Kaduna and Plateau United were going to play in Enugu for one month.

=== Managerial (head coach) changes ===
Team	Outgoing manager	Manner of departure	Date of vacancy	Incoming manager	Date of appointment
Warri Wolves	Lawrence Akpokona	fired	end of 2009-10 season	(England) Paul Aigbogun	2 September 2010
Kwara United	(Nigeria) Justin Tenger	fired	end of 2009-10 season	(Nigeria) Kadiri Ikhana	17 July 2010
Sunshine Stars	Solomon Ogbeide	fired	Aug. 18 2010	(Nigeria) Gbenga Ogunbote	Aug. 18 2010
Gombe United	Ben Duamlong	Resigned	Oct.8 2010	(Nigeria) Bernard Ogbe	Nov. 5 2010
Heartland	(Nigeria) Samson Siasia	resigned to take Super Eagles job	Dec. 1 2010	(Netherlands) Lodewijk de Kruif	Feb. 7 2011
Niger Tornadoes	(Nigeria) Ladan Bosso	fired	Nov. 26 2010	(Nigeria) Samson Unuanel (interim)	Nov. 26 2010
Crown F.C.	Ganiyu Salami	fired	Jan. 22 2011	(Nigeria) Oladunni Oyekale	Jan. 22 2011
Kano Pillars F.C.	Salisu Yusuf	resigned to become Super Eagles assistant	Jan. 1 2011	(Nigeria) Ladan Bosso	Jan. 23 2011
Niger Tornadoes	(Nigeria) Samson Unuanel	interim period ends	Feb. 6 2011	(Nigeria) Justin Tenger	Feb. 6 2011
JUTH F.C.	Tunde Abdulrahman	fired	Feb. 17 2011	(Cameroon) Emmanuel Deutsch	Feb. 28 2011
Ocean Boys F.C.	Larry Eceli	fired	May 20, 2011	(Nigeria) Samson Unuanel	May 20, 2011
Bukola Babes F.C.	Festus Allen	suspended/resigned	June 8, 2011	(Nigeria) Kabiru Sulaiman	June 8, 2011
