= 2014 Nigeria Professional Football League =

Nigeria Premier League
- Champions: Kano Pillars
- Relegated: Nembe City, Crown, Kaduna United, Gombe United
- Champions League: Kano Pillars, Enyimba International
- Confederation Cup: Warri Wolves
- Matches: 380
- Goals: 836 (2.2 per match)
- Top goalscorer: Mfon Udoh (Enyimba F.C.)- 23
- Biggest home win: Gombe United 6, Nembe City 0 (8 May); Dolphins 6, Nembe City 0 (22 Oct.)
- Biggest away win: Nembe City 0, Giwa 4 (16 Nov.)
- Highest scoring: Warri Wolves 7, Crown 1 (22 Oct.)
- Longest unbeaten run: Sharks F.C. – 10 games (19 April to 1 June)

The 2014 Nigeria Professional Football League was the 43rd season of the competition since its inception, and the 24th since the rebranding of the league as the "Professional League". The season was scheduled to kick off on November 22, about one month after the conclusion of the 2013 season. However, on that date the league's start was postponed to mid-February until after the 2014 African Nations Championship and to allow the teams to complete all their FIFA licensing. It was delayed again until March.

== Clubs ==
Sixteen teams from the previous season and four teams promoted from the Nigeria National League (Crown F.C., Giwa FC, Taraba F.C. and Abia Warriors F.C.) are participating in this season. With Abia Warriors debuting it means the Abia State derby with Enyimba will feature at the highest level of Nigerian football for the first time.

Locations of the Nigeria Premier League 2013–14 teams

Team name	Home city	Home venue	First year of current stint in League
Akwa United	Uyo	Uyo Township Stadium	2011
Bayelsa United F.C.	Yenegoa	Sapele Stadium/Samuel Ogbemudia Stadium	2012
Dolphins	Port Harcourt	Liberation Stadium	2009
Gombe United	Gombe	Pantami Stadium	1994
Heartland	Owerri	Dan Anyiam Stadium	1975
Kaduna United	Kaduna	Kaduna Township Stadium	2008
Lobi Stars	Makurdi	Emmanuel Atongo Stadium, Katsina-Ala/Aper Aku Stadium	1999
Nasarawa United	Lafia	Lafia Township Stadium	2012
Nembe City F.C.	Nembe	Krisdera Hotel Stadium, Port Harcourt	2012
Sunshine Stars	Akure	Akure Township Stadium	2007
El-Kanemi Warriors	Maiduguri	Pillars Stadium(Kano)	2012
Enugu Rangers	Enugu	Nnamdi Azikiwe Stadium	1973
Enyimba	Aba	Enyimba International Stadium	1994
Kano Pillars	Kano	Sani Abacha Stadium/Pillars Stadium	2001
Sharks	Port Harcourt	Sharks Stadium	2008
Warri Wolves	Warri	Warri Township Stadium	2008
Abia Warriors F.C.	Umuahia	Umuahia Township Stadium	2013
Giwa FC	Jos	Rwang Pam Stadium	2013
Crown F.C.	Ogbomosho	Lekan Salami Stadium, Ibadan	2013
Taraba F.C.	Jalingo	Jalingo City Stadium	2013

== Table ==
Pos	Team	Pld	W	D	L	GF	GA	GD	Pts	Qualification or relegation
1	Kano Pillars (C)	38	19	8	11	57	41	+16	65	Qualification for 2015 CAF Champions League
2	Enyimba (Q)	38	18	10	10	50	27	+23	64	Qualification for 2015 CAF Champions League
3	Warri Wolves (Q)	38	18	7	13	49	38	+11	61	Qualification for 2015 CAF Confederation Cup
4	Giwa	38	17	9	12	44	34	+10	60	
5	Nasarawa United	38	17	8	13	43	37	+6	59	
6	Lobi Stars	38	19	2	17	40	46	−6	59	
7	Abia Warriors	38	17	7	14	51	40	+11	58	
8	Enugu Rangers	38	17	7	14	45	37	+8	58	
9	Dolphins	38	15	10	13	45	34	+11	55	
10	Heartland	38	14	13	11	36	27	+9	55	
11	Sunshine Stars	38	14	12	12	51	47	+4	54	
12	Taraba	38	16	5	17	35	41	−6	53	
13	Sharks	38	14	10	14	42	39	+3	52	
14	El-Kanemi Warriors	38	14	9	15	43	35	+8	51	
15	Bayelsa United	38	16	3	19	50	54	−4	51	
16	Akwa United	38	14	9	15	27	34	−7	51	
17	Gombe United (R)	38	14	8	16	42	41	+1	50	Relegated to Nigeria National League
18	Crown (R)	38	11	6	21	30	56	−26	39	Relegated to Nigeria National League
19	Kaduna United (R)	38	11	5	22	33	55	−22	38	Relegated to Nigeria National League
20	Nembe City (R)	38	6	10	22	23	73	−50	28	Relegated to Nigeria National League

Updated to match(es) played on 5 Nov. 2014. Source: lmc-ng.org
Rules for classification: 1) points; 2) goal difference; 3) number of goals scored.
(C) Champions; (Q) Qualified for the phase indicated; (R) Relegated

== News ==
- - On February 21, Sunshine Stars F.C. was involved in an accident on the road between Ijebu-Ode and Akure. Five players and the team masseur went to the hospital with serious injuries. However, nobody was killed.
- - On the eve of the league start, Giwa F.C. and Nembe City (the last two Nigeria National League champions and the league's only two privately funded clubs) were withdrawn from league fixtures by the LMC for failing to provide guarantees of the minimum salary for players, leaving the league at 18 teams. Both teams appealed to be reinstated on March 20. Giwa was admitted back on the 2nd of April and Nembe City was readmitted the next day.
- - After the Week 1 games, Abia Warriors refused to travel to Maiduguri to play El-Kanemi Warriors, citing fears for safety after recent Boko Haram attacks. The league then refused to sanction games there, and El Kanemi nominally agreed to move games this season to Kano.
- - The Week 26 fixtures were suspended when the Nigeria Referees Association went on strike. The league resumed 17 September.

=== Managerial (head coach) changes ===
Team	Outgoing manager	Manner of departure	Date of vacancy	Incoming manager	Date of appointment
Nasarawa United	Kadiri Ikhana	Retired	20 Oct. 2013(preseason)	Mohammed Baba Ganaru	22 Nov. 2013
Enugu Rangers	Felix Emordi	Resigned	21 Oct. 2013	John Obuh	28 Oct. 2013
Akwa United	Justin Tenger	Contract expired	1 Nov. 2013	Emmanuel King	10 Dec. 2013
Kano Pillars	Mohammed Baba Ganaru	Resigned to take over Nasarawa United	22 Nov. 2013	Felix Emordi	30 Jan. 2014
Bayelsa United	Ladan Bosso	Resigned to take over Abia Warriors	21 February 2014	Richard Bubagha	28 Feb. 2014
Giwa FC	Abdul Bidemi Biffo	Resigned	13 April	Aminu Musa(Interim)/Kadiri Ikhana	14 April/25 May
Kaduna United	Saleh Lato	Deceased	20 April	Hassan Abubakar	27 April
Giwa FC	Kadiri Ikhana	Resigned to take Enyimba job	1 July	Duke Udi	1 July
Enyimba	Zachary Baraje	Fired	1 July	Kadiri Ikhana	1 July
Gombe United	Maurice Cooreman	Resigned- Illness	July	Augustine Eguavoen	9 July

== Top scorers ==
23 goals

- Mfon Udoh Enyimba FC
