= 2013 Nigeria Premier League =

Nigeria Premier League
- Season: 2013
- Champions: Kano Pillars
- Champions League: Pillars, Enyimba
- Confederation Cup: Bayelsa United
- Matches: 380
- Goals: 764 (2.01 per match)
- Top goalscorer: Victor Namo Nasarawa United F.C., 18
- Biggest home win: Enugu Rangers 4 Pillars 0, 28 April; Heartland 4 Gombe 0, 31 March
- Biggest away win: Shooting Stars 0 Heartland 2, 15 May
- Highest scoring: Lobi Stars 3 Bayelsa United 4, 7 July

The 2013 Nigeria Professional Football League was the 42nd season of the competition since its inception, and the 23rd since the rebranding of the league as the "Professional League". Due to start in December, numerous delays and challenges to the board pushed the opening weekend back to February, and then pushed to March 9. There was a season-opening Super Four tournament, won by Heartland F.C., between the four clubs involved in Continental competitions in order to get them ready for their international assignments.

== Clubs ==
Sixteen teams from the previous season and four teams promoted from the Nigeria National League (Bayelsa United, El-Kanemi Warriors, Nasarawa United and Nembe City F.C.) participated in this season.

Locations of the Nigeria Premier League 2012–13 teams

Team name	Home city	Home venue	First year of current stint in League
ABS FC	Ilorin	Kwara State Stadium	2011
Akwa United	Uyo	Uyo Township Stadium/Rojenny Stadium, Oba	2011
Bayelsa United F.C.	Yenegoa	Samson Siasia Stadium	2012
Dolphins	Port Harcourt	Liberation Stadium	2009
El-Kanemi Warriors	Maiduguri	El-Kanemi Stadium	2012
Enugu Rangers	Enugu	Nnamdi Azikiwe Stadium	1973
Enyimba	Aba	Enyimba International Stadium	1994
Gombe United	Gombe	Pantami Stadium	1994
Heartland	Owerri	Dan Anyiam Stadium	1975
Kaduna United	Kaduna	Kaduna Township Stadium	2008
Kano Pillars	Kano	Sani Abacha Stadium	2001
Kwara United	Ilorin	Kwara State Stadium	2009
Lobi Stars	Makurdi	Emmanuel Atongo Stadium, Katsina-Ala/Aper Aku Stadium	1999
Nasarawa United	Lafia	Lafia Township Stadium	2012
Nembe City F.C.	Nembe	Samson Siasia Stadium	2012
Sharks	Port Harcourt	Sharks Stadium	2008
Shooting Stars	Ibadan	Awolowo Stadium	2009
Sunshine Stars	Akure	Akure Township Stadium	2007
Warri Wolves	Warri	Warri Township Stadium	2008
Wikki Tourists	Bauchi	Abubarkar Tafawa Balewa Stadium	2011

== Table ==
Pos	Team	Pld	W	D	L	GF	GA	GD	Pts	Qualification or relegation
1	Kano Pillars (C)	38	20	3	15	46	40	+6	63	Qualification for 2014 CAF Champions League
2	Enyimba (Q)	38	18	8	12	32	19	+13	62	Qualification for 2014 CAF Champions League
3	Bayelsa United (Q)	38	19	4	15	42	39	+3	61	Qualification for 2014 CAF Confederation Cup
4	El-Kanemi Warriors	38	18	6	14	43	33	+10	60	
5	Enugu Rangers	38	18	4	16	47	37	+10	58	
6	Gombe United	38	18	1	19	38	46	−8	55	
7	Warri Wolves (Q)	38	15	10	13	42	33	+9	55	Qualification for 2014 CAF Confederation Cup
8	Sharks	38	15	8	15	35	32	+3	53	
9	Dolphins	38	15	8	15	32	34	−2	53	
10	Kaduna United	38	17	2	19	37	45	−8	53	
11	Heartland	38	16	4	18	39	32	+7	52	
12	Sunshine Stars	38	15	7	16	39	35	+4	52	
13	Nasarawa United	38	15	7	16	37	42	−5	52	
14	Lobi Stars	38	15	7	16	35	40	−5	52	
15	Nembe City	38	16	4	18	31	47	−16	52	
16	Akwa United	38	14	9	15	41	46	−5	51	
17	Kwara United (R)	38	13	11	14	32	32	0	50	Relegated to Nigeria National League
18	ABS (R)	38	14	8	16	35	43	−8	50	Relegated to Nigeria National League
19	Wikki Tourists (R)	38	15	4	19	40	43	−3	49	Relegated to Nigeria National League
20	Shooting Stars (R)	38	13	7	18	41	46	−5	46	Relegated to Nigeria National League

Updated to match(es) played on 20 October 2013. Source: Nigeria Premier League
Rules for classification: 1) points; 2) goal difference; 3) number of goals scored.
(C) Champions; (Q) Qualified for the phase indicated; (R) Relegated

=== News ===
Akwa United were banished to Rojenny Stadium in Anambra State for the rest of the season after a Week 18 incident against Warri Wolves where fans invaded the pitch and attacked officials.

A September game between Kano Pillars and Enyimba was abandoned in the final minutes because of crowd trouble. Pillars will play the rest of the season in Kaduna. After the league originally awarded the forfeit to Enyimba, the NFF ruled the game to be replayed 9 October in Lokoja.

=== Managerial (head coach) changes ===
Team	Outgoing manager	Manner of departure	Date of vacancy	Incoming manager	Date of appointment
Sharks F.C.	Augustine Eguavoen	Resigned	24 March 2013	Gbenga Ogunbote	30 March 2013
Sunshine Stars F.C.	Samuel Abimbola	Fired	29 May 2013	Fatai Amoo	3 June 2013
Lobi Stars F.C.	Dominic Iorfa	Interim		Evans Ogenyi	10 July 2013
Nasarawa United F.C.	Alphonsus Dke	Fired	22 August 2013	Kadiri Ikhana	22 August 2013
