= 2015 Nigeria Professional Football League =

Nigeria Premier League
- Season: 2015
- Champions: Enyimba
- Relegated: Bayelsa United; Kwara United; Sharks; Taraba
- Champions League: Enyimba; Warri Wolves
- Confederation Cup: Akwa United; Nasarawa United
- Matches: 380
- Goals: 816 (2.15 per match)
- Top goalscorer: Gbolahan Salami of Warri Wolves (17 goals)
- Biggest home win: 2 matches: Warri Wolves 5-0 El-Kanemi Warriors (26 July 2015); Sunshine Stars 5-0 El-Kanemi Warriors (23 August 2015)
- Biggest away win: 2 matches: Heartland 0-3 Sunshine Stars (3 May 2015); El-Kanemi Warriors 1-4 Gabros International (21 June 2015)
- Highest scoring: Heartland 5-2 Nasarawa United (22 March 2015)
- Longest winning run: Enugu Rangers; Warri Wolves (4)
- Longest unbeaten run: Enyimba (10)
- Longest winless run: Taraba (17)
- Longest losing run: Sunshine Stars; Taraba (4)
- All statistics correct as of 16 November 2015.

The 2015 Nigeria Professional Football League (referred to as the Nigerian Glo premier league for sponsorship reasons) is the 44th season of the Nigeria Premier League, the top Nigerian professional league for association football clubs, since its establishment in 1972. It is also the 25th season since the league was rebranded as the "Professional League."

Enyimba won their seventh league title and first since the 2009–10 season. They clinched with a week to go in the season with a scoreless draw with Warri Wolves, who were six points behind. Warri Wolves finished in second place, four points behind Enyimba, and both will represent Nigeria in the 2016 CAF Champions League. Nasarawa United placed third and qualified for the 2016 CAF Confederation Cup.

Bayelsa United, Kwara United, Sharks and Taraba each finished in the bottom four and will be relegated to the Nigeria National League for 2016. Akwa United escaped relegation, pulling out of the bottom four with a 1-0 win over Lobi Stars in their final match of the season.

== Clubs ==
A total of 20 teams will contest the league including 16 teams from the previous season and four teams promoted from the Nigeria National League. The four promoted teams replace Gombe United, Crown, Kaduna United and Nembe City who were all relegated to the National League at the end of the previous season

Locations of the Nigeria Premier League 2015 teams

== Teams ==
=== Stadiums and locations ===
Akwa United	Bayelsa United F.C.	Dolphin F.C.	Wikki Tourists	Heartland	Gabros
Akwa Ibom Stadium	Oghara Township Stadium	Liberation Stadium	Abubakar Tafawa Balewa Stadium	Dan Anyiam Stadium	Gabros Stadium
Capacity: 30,000	Capacity: 5,000	Capacity: 30,000	Capacity: 15,000	Capacity: 10,000	Capacity: 3,000
Lobi Stars	Nasarawa United	Kwara United F.C.	Sunshine Stars F.C.		
Aper Aku Stadium	Lafia Township Stadium	Kwara Stadium	Akure Township Stadium		
Capacity: 20,000	Capacity: 5,000	Capacity: 18,000	Capacity: 10,000		
El-Kanemi Warriors	Enugu Rangers	Enyimba	Kano Pillars		
Karkanda Stadium	Nnamdi Azikiwe Stadium	Enyimba International Stadium	Sani Abacha Stadium		
Capacity: 35,000	Capacity: 22,000	Capacity: 25,500	Capacity: 25,000		
Sharks	Warri Wolves	Abia Warriors F.C.	Giwa FC	Shooting Stars F.C.	Taraba F.C.
Sharks Stadium	Warri Township Stadium	Umuahia Township Stadium	Rwang Pam Stadium	Lekan Salami Stadium	Jalingo City Stadium
Capacity: 10,000	Capacity: 20,000	Capacity: 5,000	Capacity: 15,000	Capacity: 18,000	Capacity: 30,000

== Table ==
Pos	Team	Pld	W	D	L	GF	GA	GD	Pts	Qualification or relegation
1	Enyimba (C, Q)	38	19	13	6	48	27	+21	70	Qualification for 2016 CAF Champions League
2	Warri Wolves (Q)	38	19	9	10	62	29	+33	66	Qualification for 2016 CAF Champions League
3	Nasarawa United (Q)	38	18	9	11	46	35	+11	63	Qualification for 2016 CAF Confederation Cup
4	Wikki Tourists	38	18	9	11	45	36	+9	63	
5	Giwa	38	17	12	9	44	41	+3	63	
6	Sunshine Stars	38	18	7	13	58	38	+20	61	
7	Heartland	38	17	5	16	46	40	+6	56	
8	Kano Pillars	38	16	7	15	45	39	+6	55	
9	Shooting Stars	38	15	8	15	39	39	0	53	
10	Abia Warriors	38	16	5	17	39	43	−4	53	
11	Gabros International	38	14	8	16	37	40	−3	50	
12	Enugu Rangers	38	13	10	15	46	51	−5	49	
13	El-Kanemi Warriors	38	14	7	17	38	56	−18	49	
14	Lobi Stars	38	11	14	13	34	39	−5	47	
15	Akwa United (Q)	38	13	8	17	33	43	−10	47	Qualification for 2016 CAF Confederation Cup
16	Dolphins	38	11	12	15	38	40	−2	45	
17	Sharks (R)	38	11	12	15	28	39	−11	45	Relegation to Nigeria National League
18	Kwara United (R)	38	12	6	20	32	46	−14	42	Relegation to Nigeria National League
19	Taraba (R)	38	9	10	19	30	47	−17	37	Relegation to Nigeria National League
20	Bayelsa United (R)	38	7	13	18	28	48	−20	34	Relegation to Nigeria National League

Updated to match(es) played on 16 November 2015. Source: Nigeria Premier League
Rules for classification: 1) points; 2) goal difference; 3) number of goals scored.
(C) Champions; (Q) Qualified for the phase indicated; (R) Relegated

== News ==
Five Kano Pillars players were injured during an armed robbery as the club was heading south for their opener against Heartland FC. Their opening game was postponed indefinitely.

In June, the league forced several clubs to find new venues for Matchdays 12 and 13 while they make mandatory upgrades to their home grounds.

In August, Kano Pillars' 12-year undefeated streak at home came to an end in a 2-1 loss to Nasarawa United.
