= Jonah Abutu =

Nigerian footballer (born 1989)

Personal information
- Full name: Jonah Abutu
- Date of birth: 27 July 1989 (age 37)
- Place of birth: Maiduguri, Nigeria
- Height: 1.84 m (6 ft 0 in)
- Position: Defensive midfielder

Team information
- Current team: Warri Wolves F.C.
- Number: 38

Youth career
- Abaya Academy

Senior career*
Years	Team	Apps	(Gls)
2006–2008	Sharks F.C.	47	(14)
2009–2010	Bayelsa United F.C.	27	(4)
2010–2011	Dolphins F.C.	21	(4)
2011–2012	Lobi Stars F.C.	35	(9)
2012–2013	Sharks F.C.	15	(2)
2013–2014	Enyimba International F.C.	11	(0)
2014–2015	Taraba F.C.	15	(0)
2015–2016	Speranța Nisporeni	5	(0)
2019	Warri Wolves F.C.	4	(0)
- * Club domestic league appearances and goals as of 26 August 2015 ‡ National team caps and goals as of 17 January 2015

Jonah Abutu (born 27 July 1989) is a Nigerian footballer who plays as a midfielder for Warri Wolves F.C. He has been described as a crooked midfielder who possesses pace, good positioning and ability to provide assists. He has played for Lobi Stars of Makurdi, Sharks FC and Enyimba FC. He has played for Dolphins FC

Abutu scored the winning goal in 2007 Cup of Kaduna State, which qualified the team to national stage of Nigeria Federation Cup.
