= 2024 Nigeria Federation Cup =

76th edition of the Nigeria FA Cup

2024 Federation Cup
President Federation Cup

Tournament details
- Country: Nigeria
- Dates: 12 April – 29 June 2024
- Teams: 70

Final positions
- Champions: El-Kanemi Warriors (3rd title)
- Runners-up: Abia Warriors
- CAF Confederation Cup: El-Kanemi Warriors

Tournament statistics
- Matches played: 67
- Goals scored: 156 (2.33 per match)

The 2024 Nigeria Federation Cup is the 76th edition of the Nigerian Federation Cup. The tournament began with the National playoffs on 12 April and concluded with the final on 29 June. El-Kanemi Warriors won their third title and first in 32 years with a 2–0 win over Abia Warriors in the final.

This year, the format remains unchanged, except for a slight modification in the number of qualifying clubs. 70 clubs instead of the usual 74 qualified as finalists in the tournaments held across the different states of Nigeria as Yobe failed to enter a team, while Borno and Adamawa states entered just a team each.

== Format ==
The competition is a single elimination knockout tournament featuring the 36 finalists of each state tournaments plus the FCT. As not all states entered two teams, the 12 weakest clubs entered the play-off round, whereafter the winners joined the remaining 58 teams at the main tournament. All matches are played at neutral stadiums.

Matches are played 90 minutes with tied games going straight to penalties.

== National play-offs ==
All matches were played on 12 April.

Team 1	Score	Team 2
Classic FC	0–0 (4–5 p)	Gamji Eaglets
Warinje	0-0 (3–2 p)	Simon Ben Academy
Zamfara United Feeders	1–1 (5–4 p)	Proline FC
Ine Stars	2–0	Crusaders FC
Kogi Central	2–3	PCM FC
Flight FC	1–2	Fr. Eburuaja FC

== First round ==
The draw for this round was conducted on 18 April. Matches were held on 1 to 3 May.

Team 1	Score	Team 2
1 May 2024
Bendel Insurance	1–0	Stormers FC
Wikki Tourists	5–0	Junior Danburan
Osun United	1–1 (2–4 p)	EFCC FC
Zamfara United	0–1	ABS
Kebbi United	2–1	Ine Stars
Akwa United	1–0	Cynosure FC
Gombe United	3–1	Karim United
El-Kanemi Warriors	2–0	Adanimogo
Lobi Stars	6–1	Delta Marines FC
Shooting Stars	1–1 (3–2 p)	Solution FC
Ikorodu City	3–0	Green Berets
Coal City	3–0	Ekiti United Feeders
Beyond Limits	1–1 (3–4 p)	Hammola FC
Kwara United	4–1	Calabar Rovers
Sporting Supreme	3–0	PCM FC
Nasarawa United	1–0	FC Bako
One Rocket	5–0	Fr. Eburuaja FC
Plateau United	3–0	Ekiti United
Katsina United	7–1	Dutse Strikers
Doma United	3–0	Gamji Eaglets
2 May 2024
Edel FC	4–0	Discovery Talent FC
Inter Lagos	6–0	May & Frank
Warri Wolves	5–1	Lautai
Abia Warriors	4–2	Ilaji
Enyimba	1–1 (6–5 p)	Warinje
Niger Tornadoes	3–1	Niger Tornadoes Feeders
Sokoto United	2–2 (4–2 p)	Ofirima
Mighty Jets	0–1	Zamfara United Feeders
Kano Pillars	1–1 (6–5 p)	Enugu Rangers
3 May 2024
Sunshine Stars	w/o	Jedo Academy
Bayelsa United	2–0	FC Basira
Rivers United	1–0	Ikukuoma FC

== Second round ==
Matches were played on 22 and 23 May 2024.

Team 1	Score	Team 2
22 May 2024
Bendel Insurance	0–2	Wikki Tourists
EFCC FC	0–0 (5–4 p)	Edel FC
Gombe United	w/o	El-Kanemi Warriors
Lobi Stars	0–2	Shooting Stars
Hammola FC	0–0 (1–4 p)	Inter Lagos
Warri Wolves	0–1	Kwara United
Abia Warriors	1–0	Sporting Supreme
Nasarawa United	0–1	Sokoto United
One Rocket	0–1	Enyimba
Plateau United	1–1 (2–3 p)	Sunshine Stars
Katsina United	1–0	Bayelsa United
Doma United	0–1	Kano Pillars
Rivers United	1–0	Niger Tornadoes
23 May 2024
Ikorodu City	2–1	Coal City
Akwa United	4–1	Zamfara United Feeders
ABS	1–2	Kebbi United

== Third round ==
Matches were held on 29 May.

Team 1	Score	Team 2
Kebbi United	1–0	Akwa United
Wikki Tourists	0–1	EFCC FC
El-Kanemi Warriors	1–0	Shooting Stars
Ikorodu City	1–1 (4–5 p)	Inter Lagos
Kwara United	1–1 (3–4 p)	Abia Warriors
Sokoto United	1–0	Enyimba
Sunshine Stars	1–0	Rivers United
Katsina United	1–1 (7–8 p)	Kano Pillars

== Quarter-final ==
All matches were played on 5 June.

Team 1	Score	Team 2
EFCC FC	0–0 (3–4 p)	Kebbi United
El-Kanemi Warriors	2–1	Inter Lagos
Abia Warriors	1–1 (5–4 p)	Sokoto United
Sunshine Stars	1–1 (3–5 p)	Kano Pillars

5 June 2024	EFCC FC	0–0 (3–4 p)	Kebbi United	Sani Abacha Stadium, Kano
16:00 (UTC+1)

5 June 2024	El-Kanemi Warriors	2–1	Inter Lagos	Bwari Stadium, Bwari
16:00 (UTC+1)	15'; Muktar Ismail 79'		Uchenna Njoku 30'

5 June 2024	Abia Warriors	1–1 (5–4 p)	Sokoto United	FIFA Goal Project Pitch, Abuja
16:00 (UTC+1)	Okorie 29'		59'

5 June 2024	Sunshine Stars	1–1 (3–5 p)	Kano Pillars	Area 3 Pitch, Abuja
16:00 (UTC+1)	Nwafor 44'		Ali 37'

== Semi-final ==
Both matches were played on 20 June.

Team 1	Score	Team 2
Abia Warriors	0–0 (4–3 p)	Kano Pillars
Kebbi United	0–0 (4–5 p)	El-Kanemi Warriors

20 June 2024	Abia Warriors	0–0 (4–3 p)	Kano Pillars	Lafia City Stadium, Lafia
15:30 (UTC+1)

20 June 2024	El-Kanemi Warriors	0–0 (5–4 p)	Kebbi United	FIFA Goal Project Pitch, Abuja
16:00 (UTC+1)

== Final ==
This is Abia Warriors first cup final while El-Kanemi Warriors are two times cup winners; the winner of this match automatically qualifies for the 2024–25 CAF Confederation Cup. It was played on 29 June at the Onikan Stadium in Lagos after it was initially slated to be played at the National Stadium in Abuja.

Team 1	Score	Team 2
Abia Warriors	0–2	El-Kanemi Warriors

29 June 2024	Abia Warriors	0–2	El-Kanemi Warriors	Onikan Stadium, Lagos
16:00 (UTC+1)			Nasiru Salihu 32', 68'	Referee: Kassim Adulsalam
