= Fidelis Saviour =

Nigerian footballer

Saviour Fidelis
Personal information
- Full name: Terungwa Fidelis
- Date of birth: April 18, 1988 (age 38)
- Place of birth: Ushongo, Benue State, Nigeria
- Height: 1.83 m (6 ft 0 in)
- Position: Striker

Team information
- Current team: Mosta F.C.

Youth career
- Bison F.C.
- Dantanta United

Senior career*
| Years | Team | Apps | (Gls) |
| | JUTH F.C. | - | (-) |
| 2005 | Zamfara United | 27 | (19) |
| 2011 | Kaduna United | 23 | (14) |
| 2012 | Ranchers Bees | | |
| 2012 | Taraba F.C. | | (13) |
| 2012–2013 | Enyimba | 15 | (13) |
| 2014 | Taraba F.C. | 19 | (13) |
| 2015 | Mosta F.C. / Sliema Wanderers | 18 / 9 | (6 / 5) |
| 2017/ 2018 | Għarb Rangers | 9 | (8) |
- * Club domestic league appearances and goals as of 20 September 2012 ‡ National team caps and goals as of 5 June 2011

Terungwa "Saviour" Fidelis (born April 18, 1988) is a Nigerian football player. He is currently playing for Taraba F.C. in the Nigeria Premier League.

== Club career ==
A journeyman striker, he has played for no less than six Nigerian clubs and trialed abroad in Oman, and Sudan. He spent the 2012 Nigeria National League season at Taraba F.C. after transferring from Ranchers Bees FC. He led the second-level (Nigeria National League) with 12 goals in 13 total games which led to a call-up for the Nigeria national football team. He signed with Enyimba in September 2012. He was the leading top scorer in the Nigeria Premier League midway in 2013.

He returned to Taraba at the start of the 2014 season.

In 2015 he moved to Malta to play with Mosta FC; midway in 2015 went on loan to Sliema Wanderers and won the Maltese FA CUP 2015/2016. In 2016/2017 he moved to Għarb Rangers where he played 9 games scoring 8 goals. Terminated his current contract, on 15/01/2017 he became a free agent.
