= Dengo Ebinipere =

Nigerian footballer

Personal information
- Full name: Denigo Ebinipere
- Date of birth: June 10, 1990 (age 36)
- Place of birth: Brass, Nigeria
- Height: 1.89 m (6 ft 2 1/2 in)
- Position: Defender

Team information
- Current team: Bayelsa United
- Number: 13

Youth career
- 2004–2006: Ocean Boys

Senior career*
Years	Team	Apps	(Gls)
2007–2012	Ocean Boys	67	(4)
2012	Dolphins F.C.		
2013–	Bayelsa United		
- * Club domestic league appearances and goals

Denigo Ebinipere (born 10 June 1990 in Brass) is a Nigerian footballer who currently plays for Bayelsa United.

== Career ==
The defender played 2009/2010 for Ocean Boys F.C. in the CAF Confederation Cup, after the win of the Nigerian FA Cup in 2008. After eight years with Ocean Boys F.C., he signed on 10 May 2012 with league rival Dolphins F.C.

== Honours ==
- 2008: FA Cup Winner
