= Raphael Udah =

Nigerian footballer

Personal information
- Date of birth: September 1, 1989 (age 37)
- Place of birth: Nigeria
- Height: 1.78 m (5 ft 10 in)
- Position: Midfielder

Team information
- Current team: Duhok SC
- Number: 34

Youth career
- Nasarawa United F.C.

Senior career*
| Years | Team | Apps | (Gls) |
| 2009–2011 | KuPS | 52 | (5) |
| 2012–2013 | Al Najaf | 22 | (9) |
| 2013–2014 | Duhok | 18 | (9) |
| 2014–2015 | Nasarawa United | 17 | (7) |
| 2015–2016 | Giwa | 18 | (11) |
| 2016–2017 | Kano Pillars | 20 | (7) |
- * Club domestic league appearances and goals as of 25 December 2011

Raphael Udah (born September 1, 1989) is a Nigerian footballer. He currently plays for Duhok SC in the Iraqi Premier League.

== Career statistics ==
As of 26 April 2025

Appearances and goals by club, season and competition
| Club | Season | League | | | National cup (Note: Includes Suomen Cup) | | Continental | | Total | |
| Club | Season | Division | Apps | Goals | Apps | Goals | Apps | Goals | Apps | Goals |
|---|---|---|---|---|---|---|---|---|---|---|
| KuPS | 2009 | Veikkausliiga | 10 | 0 | 2 | 0 | – | | 12 | 0 |
| KuPS | 2010 | Veikkausliiga | 18 | 3 | 3 | 1 | – | | 21 | 4 |
| KuPS | 2011 | Veikkausliiga | 24 | 2 | 1 | 0 | 1 (Note: Appearance in UEFA Europa League) | 0 | 26 | 2 |
| KuPS | Total | | 52 | 5 | 6 | 1 | 1 | 0 | 59 | 6 |
| Al Najaf | 2012–13 | Iraqi Elite League | 22 | 9 | – | | – | | 22 | 9 |
| Duhok | 2013–14 | Iraqi Premier League | 18 | 9 | – | | – | | 18 | 9 |
| Nasarawa United | 2015 | NPFL | 17 | 7 | – | | – | | 17 | 7 |
| Giwa | 2016 | NPFL | 18 | 11 | – | | – | | 18 | 11 |
| Kano Pillars | 2017 | NPFL | 20 | 7 | – | | – | | 20 | 7 |
| Career total | | | 147 | 48 | 6 | 1 | 1 | 0 | 154 | 49 |
