= Udah =

Udah is a surname. Notable people with the surname include:

- Azubuko Udah (born 1954), Nigerian police officer
- Raphael Udah (born 1989), Nigerian footballer
