= Ebiabowei Baker =

Nigerian footballer (born 1994)

Personal information
- Date of birth: 30 January 1994 (age 32)
- Place of birth: Nembe, Nigeria
- Height: 1.93 m (6 ft 4 in)
- Position: Defender

Team information
- Current team: Bayelsa United
- Number: 30

Youth career
- Timpa United

Senior career*
Years	Team	Apps	(Gls)
2009	Bayelsa United	6	(0)
2009–2011	Nembe City	28	(1)
2011–2014	Dolphin	59	(0)
2015–2018	Tarxien Rainbows	75	(5)
2018–2019	Al-Qadsia		
2019	Zob Ahan	1	(0)
2020–2021	Al-Tadamon		
2024–	Bayelsa United	0	(0)
- * Club domestic league appearances and goals as of 11 April 2025

Ebiabowei Baker (born 30 January 1994) is a Nigerian footballer who plays as a defender for Bayelsa United. He has been described as a reliable central defender who possesses pace, comfortable with the ball, solid, strong, natural defender as well as the ability to lead from the back and a good aerial presence.

== Club career ==
=== Timpa United F.C. (2009) ===
Ebiabowei began his youth career with Timpa United then at Bayelsa state challenge cup, where they got knocked out at the semi-finals by former Nigeria Professional Football League champions Ocean Boys of Brass, Bayelsa at the semi-finals of the competition. Due to his brilliant performance, he got snapped up by Bayelsa United immediately after the competition.

=== Bayelsa United F.C (2009–2012) ===
In the 2009–10 season he transferred to Bayelsa United F.C., his hometown club in the Nigerian Professional Football League. On 12 April 2010 he made his official debut in the Nigeria top flight at the age of 16 when Bayelsa United Played as visitors against host Gateway F.C. at Abeokuta in far away Ogun State. That happened to be his only taste of 1st team action until they got relegated to the Nigeria national league. He would go on to make only 5 appearances in the lower league before jumping ship to harsh rivals Nembe city football club of Nembe - Bayelsa State.

=== Nembe City F.C (2011–2013) ===
After making the switch to Nembe City in their debut season in the Nigerian national league, and with 13 appearances and against all odds, they got promoted to the Nigeria premier football league as league champions. In their debut season in the NPFL (Nigeria professional football league, he made 6 appearances in the first 9 matches, but with hard work and dedication, which led to a goal in their 2–1 loss away to Nasarawa United in lafia. With a mouth watering offer from Dolphins football club of Port Harcourt that he could not resist, he moved to Dolphins F.C during the week-9 transfer window of the league season.

=== Dolphins F.C (2013–2014) ===
After making his debut in a substitute appearance against Kaduna United on 15 May 2013, he would go on to make 24 appearances in total for his new club, where he is sometimes used as a defensive midfielder, due to his ability to read games and calm composure while with the ball.

=== Tarxien Rainbows F.C. (2015-2016) ===
After an impressive league season with Dolphins FC of Port Harcourt, Baker secured a two-year contract with Tarxien Rainbows FC of Malta with an agreement of moving at any time he could secure a much better contract.

== International career ==
On 25 April 2012 he was invited to the national under-20 team known as the Flying Eagles by coach John Obuh alongside three other players from Nembe City F.C., but missed the tournament due to injury. In December 2014 he was called up to the Nigeria national under-23 team. where he made three appearances against Warri Wolves, Dolphins FC and Kano Pillars in the 2015 Nigeria Globacom super 6 tournament held at Abuja and scoring a debut goal which turned out to be the winner in their first match against Warri Wolves football club of Warri. The "dream team" as the national under-23 team of Nigeria is fondly called, emerged 2nd in the tourney, behind the Flying Eagles of Nigeria.

== Honours ==
=== Club ===
- Bayelsa United F.C.: Federation Cup: Runners-up
- Nembe City F.C.: Nigerian National League: Champions 2010-2011
