= List of Nigeria women's national football team managers =

This is a list of the managers of the Nigeria women's national football team, starting from the first international game in 1991 till date.

The current head coach is American Randy Waldrum.

== Manager history ==
Name	Start date	End date	Notes	Ref
Jo Bonfrere			managed Nigeria at 1991 FIFA Women's World Cup, concurrently with the men's national team of Nigeria.	
Paul Hamilton			regarded as the first coach of the women national team; managed Nigeria at 1995 FIFA Women's World Cup	
Ismaila Mabo			managed Nigeria to quarter finals at 1999 FIFA Women's World Cup, thus regarded as the most successful coach; led Nigeria to 2000 Olympics and 2004 Olympics	
Samuel Okpodu	2002		managed Nigeria at 2003 FIFA Women's World Cup	
Godwin Izilien			managed Nigeria to win 2004 African Women's Championship	
Ntiero Effiom			managed Nigeria at 2007 FIFA Women's World Cup; led Nigeria to win 2003 All-Africa Games	
Joseph Ladipo			managed Nigeria at 2008 Olympics; led Nigeria to win 2007 All-Africa Games; managed Nigeria to third place finish at 2008 African Women's Championship	
Uche Eucharia		October 2011	managed Nigeria to win 2010 African Women's Championship; managed Nigeria at 2011 FIFA Women's World Cup	
Kadiri Ikhana	April 2012	November 2012	led Nigeria to fourth place at 2012 African Women's Championship	
Edwin Okon		June 2015	managed Nigeria to win 2014 African Women's Championship; managed Nigeria at 2015 FIFA Women's World Cup	
Christopher Danjuma		September 2015	led Nigeria to fourth place at 2015 All-Africa Games	
Florence Omagbemi	February 2016	December 2016	led Nigeria to win 2016 Africa Women Cup of Nations	
Thomas Dennerby	January 2018	October 2019	led Nigeria to win at 2019 WAFU Zone B Women's Cup	
Randy Waldrum	October 2020	2024	led Nigeria to a fourth place finish at 2022 Women's Africa Cup of Nations; managed Nigeria at 2023 FIFA Women's World Cup and the 2024 Olympics, their first since 2008.	
