= 2016 Nigeria Professional Football League =

Nigeria Premier League
- Season: 2016
- Champions: Enugu RangersGUI
- Relegated: Giwa; Heartland; Ikorodu United; Warri Wolves
- Champions League: Enugu Rangers; Rivers United
- Confederation Cup: Wikki Tourist
- Matches: 342
- Goals: 734 (2.15 per match)
- Top goalscorer: Godwin Obaje (18)
- Biggest home win: Kano Pillars 6-0 Shooting Stars (24 April 2016)
- Biggest away win: El Kanemi Warriors 1-3 Akwa United (30 March 2016)
- Highest scoring: 3 matches: Kano Pillars 6-0 Shooting Stars (24 April 2016); Akwa United 3-3 Sunshine Stars (8 June 2016); Nasarawa United 4-2 Ifeanyi Uba (12 June 2016)
- Longest winning run: Plateau United; Wikki Tourist (4)
- Longest unbeaten run: Abia Warriors (10)
- Longest winless run: Ikorodu United (10)
- Longest losing run: Ikorodu United (5)
- Highest attendance: 40,000 El Kanemi at Rangers International
- Average attendance: 8,600
- All statistics correct as of 2 October 2016.

The 2016 Nigeria Professional Football League (referred to as the Nigerian Glo premier league for sponsorship reasons) is the 45th season of the Nigeria Premier League, the top Nigerian professional league for association football clubs, since its establishment in 1972, and the 26th since the rebranding of the league as the "Professional League".

Enugu Rangers won their seventh league title and first since 1984. Giwa, Heartland, Ikorodu United and Warri Wolves finished as the bottom four teams in the standings and will be relegated to Nigeria National League for the 2017 season.

== Clubs ==
A total of 20 teams will contest the league including 16 teams from the previous season and four teams promoted from the Nigeria National League. The four promoted teams replace Bayelsa United, Kwara United, Sharks and Taraba who were all relegated to the National League at the end of the previous season

Locations of the Nigeria Premier League 2015 teams

== League table ==
Pos	Team	Pld	W	D	L	GF	GA	GD	Pts	Qualification or relegation
1	Enugu Rangers (C)	36	18	9	9	53	37	+16	63	Qualification to the 2017 CAF Champions League
2	Rivers United	36	19	3	14	38	29	+9	60	Qualification to the 2017 CAF Champions League
3	Wikki Tourist	36	16	9	11	45	28	+17	57	Qualification to the 2017 CAF Confederation Cup
4	Ifeanyi Uba	36	16	8	12	37	33	+4	56	Qualification to the 2017 CAF Confederation Cup
5	Lobi Stars	36	16	7	13	41	35	+6	55	
6	Sunshine Stars	36	14	11	11	44	37	+7	53	
7	Kano Pillars	36	15	7	14	47	40	+7	52	
8	El Kanemi Warriors	36	16	3	17	37	40	−3	51	
9	Enyimba	36	14	8	14	34	35	−1	50	
10	Nasarawa United	36	16	2	18	41	43	−2	50	
11	Niger Tornadoes	36	15	4	17	40	42	−2	49	
12	Plateau United	36	13	10	13	34	37	−3	49	
13	Abia Warriors	36	12	12	12	35	39	−4	48	
14	Akwa United	36	13	8	15	45	46	−1	47	
15	Shooting Stars	36	14	5	17	41	48	−7	47	
16	MFM	36	12	9	15	36	40	−4	45	
17	Warri Wolves (R)	36	12	9	15	29	38	−9	45	Relegation to the Nigeria National League
18	Heartland (R)	36	11	11	14	25	30	−5	44	Relegation to the Nigeria National League
19	Ikorodu United (R)	36	7	11	18	32	55	−23	32	Relegation to the Nigeria National League
20	Giwa (Note: Giwa was expelled from the league following Week 18 after failing to honor three consecutive home matches. All matches involving Giwa, played and unplayed, were suspended.) (R)	0	0	0	0	0	0	0	0	Relegation to the Nigeria National League

Updated to match(es) played on 2 October 2016. Source: Standings
Rules for classification: 1) points; 2) goal difference; 3) number of goals scored.
(C) Champions; (R) Relegated

== Positions by round ==
Team ╲ Round	1	2	3	4	5	6	7	8	9	10	11	12	13	14	15	16	17	18	19	20	21	22	23	24	25	26	27	28	29	30	31	32	33	34	35	36	37	38
Enugu Rangers	14	14	8	5	1	2	1	1	1	2	1	2	1	3	3	5	1	1	3	4	2	3	3	2	2	2	1	2	1	1	2	3	4	1	2	1	1	1
Rivers United	4	8	3	9	5	7	12	10	6	5	8	5	7	7	5	1	6	2	1	2	3	2	2	3	3	3	3	3	3	3	1	2	1	2	1	2	2	2
Wikki Tourist	4	5	9	4	7	11	6	8	8	3	6	9	6	8	7	9	3	4	4	1	1	1	1	1	1	1	2	1	2	2	3	1	2	3	4	3	4	3
Ifeanyi Uba	4	6	12	7	8	4	5	3	5	1	2	1	3	4	6	4	8	8	11	11	12	13	11	10	12	11	10	8	8	10	7	5	3	4	3	4	3	4
Lobi Stars	4	2	4	1	4	5	7	3	4	7	9	7	5	5	4	6	5	6	5	8	5	6	8	9	8	8	6	7	5	6	5	7	8	5	6	5	6	5
Sunshine Stars	8	15	16	18	19	19	19	20	17	18	18	13	17	15	15	12	13	10	6	6	8	5	5	5	6	6	7	6	9	4	4	4	5	8	5	7	5	6
Kano Pillars	1	4	2	3	2	3	3	5	2	9	5	8	4	1	1	2	4	5	2	3	4	4	4	4	5	4	5	4	4	5	8	6	7	7	9	6	7	7
El Kanemi Warriors	17	15	16	19	16	17	16	16	11	14	11	17	14	16	18	17	17	17	17	12	14	11	14	11	14	9	13	13	16	12	13	12	13	12	10	10	8	8
Enyimba	17	18	19	14	18	18	18	17	18	17	17	19	19	18	11	13	10	11	8	5	6	7	9	6	4	5	4	5	6	7	9	10	9	6	7	8	10	9
Nasarawa United	14	17	18	20	20	20	20	19	20	19	19	18	15	14	16	15	15	13	15	15	15	15	15	14	10	12	11	9	7	9	6	9	6	10	8	9	9	10
Niger Tornadoes	14	7	11	6	12	6	10	6	10	10	13	10	13	9	12	10	16	14	13	13	11	12	13	15	11	13	14	15	12	14	12	13	11	13	12	13	11	11
Plateau United	1	3	1	10	10	12	8	11	13	15	12	15	12	13	14	16	14	16	16	17	17	17	18	18	16	16	16	16	13	11	11	11	12	11	13	11	12	12
Abia Warriors	8	9	6	8	9	8	13	13	9	8	4	3	2	2	2	3	2	3	9	7	9	10	7	8	13	14	12	12	15	15	16	17	17	17	17	14	15	13
Akwa United	8	12	15	11	15	10	4	7	7	6	3	6	10	11	9	7	7	7	7	10	10	9	6	7	7	7	8	10	10	8	10	8	10	9	11	12	13	14
Shooting Stars	17	18	10	13	11	13	9	12	16	12	16	12	16	17	17	18	18	18	18	18	18	18	16	16	17	17	17	17	14	16	15	15	14	14	14	15	14	15
MFM	1	1	5	2	3	1	2	2	3	4	7	4	7	6	8	8	11	12	10	9	7	8	10	12	9	10	9	11	11	13	14	14	15	16	15	16	17	16
Warri Wolves	12	10	13	16	6	9	14	14	14	16	15	11	9	10	13	11	9	9	12	14	13	14	12	13	15	15	15	14	17	17	17	18	18	15	16	17	18	17
Heartland	12	10	14	17	14	15	15	15	12	13	10	14	11	12	10	14	12	15	14	16	16	16	17	17	18	18	18	18	18	18	18	16	16	18	18	18	16	18
Ikorodu United	8	12	7	12	13	16	17	18	19	20	20	20	20	20	20	20	20	20	19	19	19	19	19	19	19	19	19	19	19	19	19	19	19	19	19	19	19	19
Giwa	17	20	20	15	17	14	11	9	15	11	14	16	18	19	19	19	19	19	-	-	-	-	-	-	-	-	-	-	-	-	-	-	-	-	-	-	-	-

Leader
2017 CAF Champions League or 2017 CAF Confederation Cup
Relegation to Nigeria National League

Updated to match(es) played on 2 October 2016. Source: Soccerway
