= Obuh =

- Gender: Male
- Language: Igbo

Origin
- Origin: Nigerian
- Region of origin: South East, Nigeria

Obuh audiois a Nigerian surname. It is a male name and of Igbo origin.

== Notable individuals with the name ==
- John Obuh (born 1960), Nigerian footballer and coach
- Kingsley Obuh (born 1976), Nigerian Anglican Bishop
