= Godwin Izilien =

Nigerian football coach (c. 1942/1943–2024)

Personal information
- Full name: Godwin Izilien
- Date of birth: c. 1942/1943
- Place of birth: Edo State, Nigeria
- Date of death: February 7, 2024
- Place of death: Benin City, Edo State, Nigeria

Senior career*
Years	Team	Apps	(Gls)
- Nigeria

Managerial career
- Bendel Insurance
- New Nigeria Bank F.C.
- Sharks F.C
- Dolphins F.C.
- Edo Queens F.C.
- 2004: Nigeria Women
- 2005: Nigeria U17
- * Club domestic league appearances and goals

Godwin Izilien (sometimes spelled Izilein; c. 1942/1943 – 7 February 2024) was a Nigerian football coach and former international player from Edo State, Nigeria. He was a former Super Falcon and Golden Eaglets coach, and was best known as the head coach who led Nigeria's Super Falcons to victory at the 2004 Women's Africa Cup of Nations (then known as the African Women's Championship) in Johannesburg, South Africa, and as the head coach of Nigeria's Golden Eaglets (national under-17 team) at the 2005 Africa U-17 Cup of Nations. In his final years, Izilien became a prominent public critic of the Nigeria Football Federation (NFF) over unpaid bonuses he said he was owed from the 2004 championship, a grievance that remained unresolved at the time of his death and drew significant press attention and commentary.

== Early life and playing career ==
Izilien was from Edo State, Nigeria. As a player, he represented Nigeria's men's national team, the then Green Eagles now known as Super Eagles under coach Alabi Aisien. He later trained as a football coach in Germany.

== Coaching career ==
Izilien coached several Nigerian club sides over his career, including Bendel Insurance, New Nigeria Bank F.C. (NNB FC), Sharks F.C., Dolphins F.C., and Edo Queens F.C. As head coach of the then Mid-West regional team, he took charge of a side that played an exhibition match against a touring Brazilian team at the Samuel Ogbemudia Stadium in Benin City. He was the first coach to win a gold medal at Nigeria's National Sports Festival, in 1999.

Izilien was appointed as the head coach of the Nigeria's women's national team, the Super Falcons and led them to the 2004 African Women Championship title in Johannesburg, South Africa, defeating Cameroon 5-0 in the final to win their 6th title. Following the victory, the team staged a protest that lasted four days, refusing to return home until they were paid their entitlements.

Izilien also coached Nigeria's national under-17 team, the Golden Eaglets, to the 2005 Africa U-17 Championship where they were grouped with South Africa, Ivory coast and Zimbabwe. They didn't qualify for the knockout stage after drawing 2-2 to South Africa, and losing 2-3 to Ivory coast. Although they won their last game against Zimbabwe, winning 4-1, they didn't have enough points to qualify for the knockout stages with South Africa and Ivory Coast progressing in the competition

After leaving coaching, Izilien remained an outspoken commentator on Nigerian football administration. In 2015, he criticised the Nigerian Football Federation's use of a regional "quota system" in national team selection, arguing that it undermined coaches' ability to select the strongest possible squads. Months before his death in November 2023, he publicly urged the Nigerian Football federation to urgently appoint a substantive head coach for the Super Falcons rather than leaving the position vacant

== Dispute over unpaid entitlements ==
For roughly two decades after the 2004 championship, Izilien said the NFF had failed to pay him and his coaching crew a combined $28,750 in bonuses and allowances from the tournament, of which $12,000 was owed to him personally, as well as a ₦2 million award reportedly promised by then-President Olusegun Obasanjo. He raised the matter repeatedly and publicly over the years, including in an appeal to the federal government in 2015, a 2021 interview in which he stated that NFF president Amaju Pinnick had acknowledged the debt in the presence of Edo State governor Godwin Obaseki but failed to resolve it, and further interviews in 2023 in which he said he no longer expected to be paid. He told reporters he wished to "be honored while I am still alive and not when I am gone."

== Death ==
Izilien died on 7 February 2024 at the University of Benin Teaching Hospital (UBTH) in Benin City, Edo State, at the age of 81, following a brief illness described as abdominal issues. Bendel Insurance media officer Kehinde Osagiede confirmed his death, describing him as someone who "gave everything to discovering and nurturing football talents, both male and female, in Nigeria." He was survived by his wife and children.

Following his death, the NFF issued a statement of condolence, with the federation's general secretary, Mohammed Sanusi, saying Izilien "left giant footprints in the sands of time." Edo State deputy governor Philip Shaibu also publicly mourned him as "an illustrious son of Edo State who contributed his own quota to the development of Nigerian football."

The NFF's tribute drew criticism from some commentators, who noted the contrast between the federation's public praise and its decades-long failure to pay Izilien's outstanding entitlements, calling it "a reminder of how Nigeria mocks Nigerians."

== See also ==
- Nigeria women's national football team
- Women's Africa Cup of Nations
- Golden Eaglets
