= Segun Oluwaniyi =

Nigerian footballer (born 1982)

Personal information
- Full name: Segun Oluwaniyi
- Date of birth: April 24, 1982 (age 44)
- Place of birth: Oyo State, Nigeria
- Height: 1.90 m (6 ft 3 in)
- Position: Goalkeeper

Team information
- Current team: Shooting Stars F.C.
- Number: 35

Youth career
- 1998: Villa Rock F.C.
- 1999: Osun United
- 2000: Niger Tornadoes
- 2000–2001: Gombe United F.C.

Senior career*
Years	Team	Apps	(Gls)
2001–2003	Gombe United F.C.	24	(0)
2004–2005	Enugu Rangers	20	(0)
2006–2009	Dolphins F.C.	80	(0)
2009–	Shooting Stars F.C.	18	(0)

International career
2010–	Nigeria	1	(0)
- * Club domestic league appearances and goals

Segun Oluwaniyi (born 24 April 1982 in Oyo State) is a Nigerian football (soccer) player currently with Shooting Stars F.C. of Nigeria.

== Career ==
=== Youth ===
Oluwaniyi began 1998 to play football in the youth side for Villa Rock in Abuja and signed one year later for Osun United. After a successful year in the b-youth from Osun United was scouted by Niger Tornadoes, but he could not make the team and joined Gombe United F.C. after a half year.

=== Professional ===
In the 2001 season he started his professional career with Gombe United F.C. and in January 2004 joined Enugu Rangers. After two seasons with Rangers and 20 matches, he signed for Dolphins F.C. in December 2005. He was one of the leaders in his three and a half years by Dolphins F.C., but he signed in summer 2009 for Bayelsa United F.C.

== International career ==
He made his full senior debut on March 3, 2010 as a starter in the 5–2 win over Congo DR.
