= Interlagos (disambiguation) =

Interlagos is a district in São Paulo, Brazil.

Interlagos may also refer to:

- Autódromo José Carlos Pace, a race course
- A version of Alpine A108 car
- A model of Opteron microprocessor
- Inter Lagos F.C., a football club from Lagos, Nigeria
