= Junior Salomon =

Beninese footballer

Personal information
- Full name: Junior Salomon
- Date of birth: 8 April 1986 (age 40)
- Place of birth: Abomey, Benin
- Height: 1.84 m (6 ft 0 in)
- Position: Defender

Team information
- Current team: Plateau United
- Number: 28

Youth career
- 2006–2009: Universite du Benin

Senior career*
Years	Team	Apps	(Gls)
2009–2011	ASPAC Cotonou	44	(3)
2012–2013	ASEC Mimosas	9	(0)
2013	USS Kraké		
2013–2015	Bayelsa United		
2016–	Plateau United		

International career^{‡}
2010–	Benin	21	(0)
- * Club domestic league appearances and goals as of 22 November 2013 ‡ National team caps and goals as of 21:53, 15 August 2020 (UTC)

Junior Salomon (born 8 April 1986) is a Beninese professional footballer who plays as a defender for Plateau United and the Benin national team.

== Club career ==
Born in Abomey, Benin, Salomon began his career with Université Nationale du Bénin FC, before joining ASPAC Cotonou in November 2009. He left Benin in December 2011 and joined top Ivorian club ASEC Mimosas.

He then returned to Benin in 2013 to play for USS Kraké, briefly before being transferred to former Nigerian champions Bayelsa United in March of the same year. He joined promoted Plateau United ahead of the 2016 season after Bayelsa was relegated.

== International career ==
Salomon was part of the Benin national football team at the 2010 African Cup of Nations in Angola.

== Career statistics ==
=== International ===
As of matches played on 16 August 2020

Appearances and goals by national team and year
National team	Year	Apps	Goals
Benin	2010	1	0
Benin	2011	3	0
Benin	2012	1	0
Benin	2013	3	0
Benin	2014	0	0
Benin	2015	5	0
Benin	2016	4	0
Benin	2017	1	0
Benin	2018	2	0
Benin	2019	1	0
Benin	Total	21	0
