= Chigozie Agbim =

Nigerian footballer

Personal information
- Date of birth: 28 November 1984 (age 41)
- Place of birth: Kaduna, Nigeria
- Height: 1.87 m (6 ft 2 in)
- Position: Goalkeeper

Youth career
- 2001: Court of Appeal F.C.

Senior career*
Years	Team	Apps	(Gls)
2002-2003	Gombe United F.C.	0	(0)
2004	Al-Merrikh	0	(0)
2005	Nigeria Port Authority FC	0	(0)
2006–2009	Enugu Rangers	0	(0)
2009–2012	Warri Wolves F.C.	0	(0)
2013	Enugu Rangers	0	(0)
2014	Gombe United F.C.	0	(0)
2015–2017	Enugu Rangers	9	(0)
2019–2020	Delta Force	3	(0)

International career
2011–2015	Nigeria	14	(0)
Medal record
Men's football
Representing Nigeria
Africa Cup of Nations
Winner	2013 South Africa
- * Club domestic league appearances and goals

Chigozie Agbim MON is a Nigerian former professional footballer who played as a goalkeeper.

== Club career ==
After a protracted transfer dispute, Agbim joined Enugu Rangers from Warri Wolves in April 2013 for a fee of eight million naira (approx €39,300).

He joined Gombe United F.C. in February 2014 and rejoined Rangers in April 2015.

Agbim signed with Delta Force in March 2019.

== International career ==
Agbim made his international debut for Nigeria in a friendly against Angola in January 2012.

He was selected for Nigeria's squad at the 2013 Africa Cup of Nations and the 2013 FIFA Confederations Cup.

In January 2014, he was starting goalkeeper for the Super Eagles at the African Nations Championship, as the team finished in third place. In June, Agbim was named in Nigeria's squad for the 2014 FIFA World Cup.

== Honours ==
Orders

- Member of the Order of the Niger
