= Tochukwu (name) =

- Gender: Male
- Language: Igbo

Origin
- Origin: Nigeria
- Meaning: Praise God
- Region of origin: Southeast Nigeria

Other names
- Variant forms: Otitochukwu, Tochi, Tobechi, Tobechukwu
- Related names: Somtochukwu

Tochukwu // is a male Igbo given name. It combines the elements tò, meaning "praise", and chukwu meaning "God". Similar names include Somtochukwu ("join me in praising God") and Tobechukwu, which also means "praise God".

== Notable individuals with the name ==
- Moses Tochukwu Odo, Nigerian footballer
- Nwankwo Tochukwu, Nigerian footballer
- Simeon Tochukwu Nwankwo, Nigerian footballer
- Tochukwu Oluehi, Nigerian footballer
- Tochukwu Nnadi, Nigerian footballer
- Odumodublvk (Tochukwu Gbubemi Ojogwu), Nigerian rapper
