= Fuad Ekelojuoti =

Nigerian footballer (born 1994)

Personal information
- Full name: Fuad Olabode Ekelojuoti
- Date of birth: 1 December 1994 (age 31)
- Place of birth: Lagos, Nigeria
- Height: 1.65 m (5 ft 5 in)
- Position: Attacking midfielder

Team information
- Current team: Sunshine Stars
- Number: 32

Senior career*
Years	Team	Apps	(Gls)
2012–2013	Ocean Boys	24	(7)
2013–2014	Kwara United	20	(7)
2014–2015	Stationary Stores	26	(8)
2015–2016	Shooting Stars	28	(9)
2016–2017	First Bank	27	(12)
2017–2019	Heartland	23	(6)
2019–	Sunshine Stars	28	(8)
- * Club domestic league appearances and goals

Fuad Olabode Ekelojuoti (born 1 December 1994) is a Nigerian footballer who plays as an attacking midfielder for Sunshine Stars

== Playing career ==
Ekelojuoti was born in Lagos, and began his professional career with local club Ocean Boys.

On 4 January 2013, he left Ocean Boys and signed with Nigerian Premier League club Kwara United.

Ahead of the 2014 season, Ekelojuoti joined Stationary Stores on one and half year deal.

On 5 July 2015, he signed for Shooting Stars.

He joined First Bank on 3 July 2016, signing a one-year contract.

Ekelojuoti joined Heartland from First Bank in an undisclosed fee after a superb season.

On 20 January 2019, he was one of thirteen players to sign for Sunshine Stars
