= Abutu =

Abutu is a name. Notable people with the name include:

- Jonah Abutu (born 1989), Nigerian footballer
- Chris Abutu Garuba, Nigerian politician
