= Pillars Stadium =

Multi-purpose stadium in Kano, Nigeria

Kano Pillars Stadium
- Interactive map of Kano Pillars Stadium
- Location: Kano, Nigeria
- Coordinates: 12°00′56.5″N 8°32′35″E
- Owner: Kano State Government
- Capacity: 10,000
- Surface: Artificial

Tenants
- Kano Pillars & El-Kanemi Warriors

Pillars Stadium established in 1949 is a multi-purpose stadium in the Sabon Gari area Kano, Kano State, Nigeria. Its location is at the intersection of Abuja Road and Airport Road. It is currently used mostly for football matches and it is one of the two stadiums used by Kano Pillars FC, with the other being Sani Abacha Stadium. The stadium has a capacity of 10,000. In 2014, it became the temporary home of El-Kanemi Warriors after their home of Maiduguri was deemed unsafe for matches.
