= Ard Sluis =

Dutch football manager

Personal information
- Place of birth: Netherlands

Managerial career
- Years: Team
- 2016: Warri Wolves F.C.
- 2018/2019: DOS Kampen (youth)

Ard Sluis (born in the Netherlands) is a Dutch football manager who last worked as youth coach of DOS Kampen in his home country.

== Career ==
Sluis started his managerial career with Warri Wolves in the Nigerian Professional Football League, a position he held until 2016. After that, he coached DOS Kampen.
