= Nembe City F.C. =

Nigerian football club

Nembe City FC
- Founded: 2011
- Ground: Sapele Stadium (temporary), Samson Siasia Stadium/Krisdera Stadium, Port Harcourt
- Capacity: 20,000; 5,000
- Owner: Victor Baribote
- Chairman: Ebiakpo Baribote
- Manager: Gabriel Samuel Umunna
- League: Nigeria Premier League
- 2014: 20th (Relegated)
- Website: http://www.nembecityfc.com/
Home colours

Nembe City FC is a Nigerian football club based in Nembe, Bayelsa State, Nigeria.

They won promotion to the Nigeria Premier League by winning their division with a game to go. They became the first Nigerian club since Gabros International in 1998 to be promoted to the top flight in their first year.

The promotion was challenged in January 2013 after a court questioned if the takeover of Dalkat F.C.'s slot in the national League was legal. They were prohibited from the 2014 season for financial irregularities and not passing a ground inspection, but were readmitted right before Matchday 5.

== 2013–14 season ==
The 2013–14 season was a turbulent one for the club. They started the season facing the possibility of not being part of the League as they were unable to produce proof that they could meet the requirements set out by the League Management Company but they were allowed to join the League as the issue was later resolved. But that was the first of many more that beleaguered the team.

They spent most of the season at the foot of the table and were eventually relegated to the lower division amassing just 28 points in 38 matches. They also shipped in a record 73 goals, including a 6–0 trashing in the hands of Dolphins, a game in which striker Emem Eduok scored all six to set the record of most goals scored by a single player in a Nigeria Premier League match.

== Achievements ==
- Nigeria National League: 1

2012
