= Nwankwo Tochukwu =

Nigerian football player (born 1986)

Personal information
- Full name: Nwankwo Tochukwu
- Date of birth: 27 April 1986 (age 40)
- Place of birth: Port Harcourt, Nigeria
- Height: 1.85 m (6 ft 1 in)
- Position: Midfielder

Team information
- Current team: Ventura County Fusion
- Number: 29

Youth career
- 2001–2006: JUTH F.C.

Senior career*
Years	Team	Apps	(Gls)
2006 – 2008	JUTH F.C.	61	(15)
2008 – 2010	→ FC Koper (loan)	21	(1)
2012	Ventura County Fusion	3	(1)
- * Club domestic league appearances and goals

Nwankwo Tochukwu (born 27 April 1986 in Port Harcourt) is a Nigerian football player currently with the Ventura County Fusion.

== Career ==
Tochukwu Nwankwo is a creative midfielder who grew up in Jos, Nigeria. Some of his peers during his youth career were players such as Mikel John Obi and Victor Obinna, part of the talented group of youth players that came out of Jos during the period from 2005 to 2007.

He began his career with the Jos University Teaching Hospital Football Club, commonly known as JUTH F.C. In Nigeria he was known as a deadly freekick specialist, scoring 5 goals in one season off of freekicks.

He then moved to FC Koper of Slovenia in January 2008. He played in the UEFA Cup 2008-09 season for FC Koper and returned to Nigeria in January 2009 to his youth club JUTH F.C.

As his career as a footballer was starting, his family relocated to the United States. In December 2010, at the end of his contract with JUTH, he relocated to the United States. After a year, he restarted his career with the Ventura County Fusion, a team in the Premier Development League.
