= Delta Force F.C. =

Nigerian football club

Delta Force
- Nickname: Delta Ambassadors
- Founded: 2001
- Ground: Jay Jay Okocha Stadium, Ogwashi-Uku, Nigeria
- Capacity: 8,000
- Owner(s): Delta State Government, Nigeria
- Chairman: Okonkwo Chidi Emmanuel
- Manager: Sunday Okoh
- League: Nigeria Professional Football League

Delta Force Football Club is a football team based in Asaba, Delta State, Nigeria. They play at Jay Jay Okocha Stadium.

== History ==
The State bought over an amateur slot in 2003 and gained promotion to the then Second Division within a season.. They ended their 2009 season in fifth place of the Nigeria National League after challenging for promotion the whole season. They were disbanded by the Delta State government for lack of funds after the 2009 season but eventually reinstated to their slot in the league. They were similarly disbanded in 2008 after players protested lack of funds, but the state agreed to bring them back for the 2008–09 season.

They were resurrected again in 2015 and played in the Nigeria National League. In March 2019 they bought the slot of Kada City F.C. and took over Kada's schedule in the NPFL eleven games into the season. Kada City took over Delta's spot in the NNL.

== Current squad ==
As of 31 March 2019

Note: Flags indicate national team as defined under FIFA eligibility rules; some limited exceptions apply. Players may hold more than one non-FIFA nationality.

No.	Pos.	Nation	Player
1	GK	NGA	Chigozie Agbim
2		NGA	Bala Zaka
3		NGA	Emmanuel Ampiah
4	MF	GHA	Richard Yamoah
5		CMR	Jean Parfait Ledoux
6		NGA	Pascal Eze
7		NGA	Iwuala Anayo
8		NGA	Phillip Ozor
9		NGA	Fred Okwara

No.	Pos.	Nation	Player
10	FW	NGA	Michael Okoyoh
12		NGA	Emmanuel Nnamani
13		NGA	Christian Ekong
17		NGA	Sylvester Bell
18	GK	NGA	Victor Sochima
24		NGA	Uzoma Eziukwu
29		NGA	Kingsley Chinedu Ezeali
30		NGA	Success Esajobor
32		NGA	Okechukwu Nwadike

== Former players ==
- (Nigeria) Emmanuel Emenike
