= Duke Udi =

Nigerian footballer (born 1976)

Personal information
- Date of birth: 5 May 1976 (age 50)
- Place of birth: Nigeria
- Height: 1.78 m (5 ft 10 in)
- Position: Midfielder

Senior career*
Years	Team	Apps	(Gls)
1993	Concord		
1994–1995	Shooting Stars		
1995–1996	Grasshoppers	7	(0)
1996–1997	Slovan Bratislava	8	(0)
1997–1999	Hapoel Ironi Rishon LeZion	30	(12)
1999	Plateau United	18	(0)
2000	Enyimba		
2001	Julius Berger		
2002	Krylia Sovetov	3	(0)
2002–2004	Kwara United		
2005–2006	Lobi Stars		
2007	Shooting Stars		
2007	Sunshine Stars		
2008	Akwa United		
2008	Niger Tornadoes		

International career
1998–2002	Nigeria	4	(0)

Managerial career
- 2014: Giwa FC
- * Club domestic league appearances and goals

Duke Udi (born 5 May 1976) is a Nigerian former football player.

== Career ==
Udi started his career with Concord FC in 1993 and was part of the Shooting Stars F.C. team that won the Nigeria Premier League in 1995. He then moved to Grasshopper Club in Switzerland and played in the 1995–96 UEFA Champions League.

In 2002, he featured in the Russian league with FC Krylia Sovetov Samara. 2006 features for Lobi Stars F.C. before staging a return to Shooting Stars. On 28 August 2008, he left Akwa United F.C. and returned to Niger Tornadoes.

After earning a coaching license in the United States, he was hired to coach Giwa F.C. in July 2014.

== International ==
He played on international stage for Nigeria, with his last game in the 2002 World Cup Qualifiers.
