= Fountain F.C. =

Nigerian football club

Fountain FC
- Ground: Oluyemi Kayode Stadium
- Capacity: 4,000
- Owner: Ekiti State
- Chairman: Folorunso Olabode
- League: Nigeria National League

Fountain F.C. is a Nigerian football club. They play in the second-tier Nigeria National League. They replaced Ocean Boys F.C. in the league nine games into the 2013 season after missing out on promotion from the Nigeria Nationwide League. The 4,000 capacity Oluyemi Kayode Stadium is their home.

They were disbanded by the state government after a last-place finish, and a new club, Ekiti United, was formed and bought Canaan F.C.'s slot in the national league.
