= Ezeali Kingsley =

Nigerian footballer

Ezeali Kingsley Chinedu
Personal information
- Full name: Ezeali Kingsley Chinedu
- Date of birth: 11 October 1993 (age 33)
- Place of birth: Nigeria
- Height: 1.82 m (6 ft 0 in)
- Position: Midfielder

Team information
- Current team: Heartland
- Number: 29

Senior career*
Years	Team	Apps	(Gls)
2009–2015	Enyimba	13	(4)
2015–2018	COD United	24	(5)
2018	Delta Force	14	(1)
2018–2019	Kada City	15	(3)
2019	Delta Force	20	(2)
2019	Kwara United	13	(2)
2020–	Heartland	10	(2)
- * Club domestic league appearances and goals

Ezeali Kingsley Chinedu (born 11 September 1993) is a Nigerian footballer who plays as a midfielder for Heartland.

== Club career ==
Kingsley joined Eyimba Aba at the start of the 2008.

Ezeali joined COD United in summer, 5 January 2015.

On 6 January 2018, Ezeali signed a contract with Delta Force FC.

On 8 March 2018, he signed a contract with Kada City.

On 30 March 2019, Ezeali rejoined Delta Force FC.

On 1 November 2019, Ezeali joined Kwara United.

On 8 January 2020, Ezeali joined Heartland.
