= Emmanuel Ogoli =

Nigerian footballer

Personal information
- Date of birth: 1989
- Place of birth: Nigeria
- Date of death: 12 December 2010 (aged 20–21)
- Place of death: Yenagoa, Nigeria
- Position: Left back

Senior career*
Years	Team	Apps	(Gls)
- Bayelsa United
- Ocean Boys
- * Club domestic league appearances and goals

Emmanuel Ogoli (1989 – 12 December 2010) was a Nigerian professional footballer who played as a left back.

== Career ==
Ogoli played club football for Bayelsa United and Ocean Boys. On 12 December 2010, Ogoli collapsed on the pitch while playing for Ocean Boys, and died later in hospital. Ogoli had earlier received a "horror injury" in a match on 14 November 2010. Both the Nigeria Premier League and the Nigeria Football Federation announced separate investigations into his death.
