= Jay Jay Okocha Stadium =

Stadium in Ogwashi-Uku

Jay Jay Okocha arena
- Interactive map of Jay Jay Okocha arena
- Former names: Ogwashi-Uku Stadium
- Coordinates: 6.182433°N 6.524141°E
- Owner: Delta State Government
- Capacity: 8,000

Jay Jay Okocha Stadium is a stadium in Ogwashi-Uku, Aniocha South, Nigeria named after former Super Eagles captain Jay-Jay Okocha. It is currently used mostly for football matches and the home stadium of Delta Force F.C. Renamed after Okocha in June 2008, the stadium has a capacity of 8,000 people and hosted matches for the 2008 WAFU U-20 Championship won by Ghana.

== History ==
In 2015, it became one of the venues for the 2015 Delta State Federation Cup.

Nine years later, during the 2024 Zenith Bank/Delta Principals Cup, A secondary school competition, It hosted the semi-final between Umutu Secondary School and Utagbe Secondary School, In which Utagbe Secondary School advanced to the final by winning 1-0.
