= Edo Arena =

Indoor arena in Benin City, Nigeria

- Rema's Dome
- Interactive map of Edo Arena
- Address: Former Garrick Memorial School Ground, Ekehuan Road; Benin City; Nigeria
- Capacity: 6,000

Construction
- Groundbreaking: 28 August 2024
- Opened: 2025

Edo Arena also known as Rema's Dome or The Dome, is an indoor arena under construction in Benin City, Edo State, Nigeria. The arena is estimated to hold a 6,000 capacity.

== History ==
Edo Arena is an indoor entertainment hub of Edo State that was planned by the current Governor of Edo State, Godwin Obaseki to mark Edo State's 33rd anniversary. The arena was named after Nigerian Afrobeats artiste Rema. Godwin Obaseki and Rema did the ground opening on August 28, 2024.
