= Azubuko Udah =

Nigerian police inspector general (b. 1954)

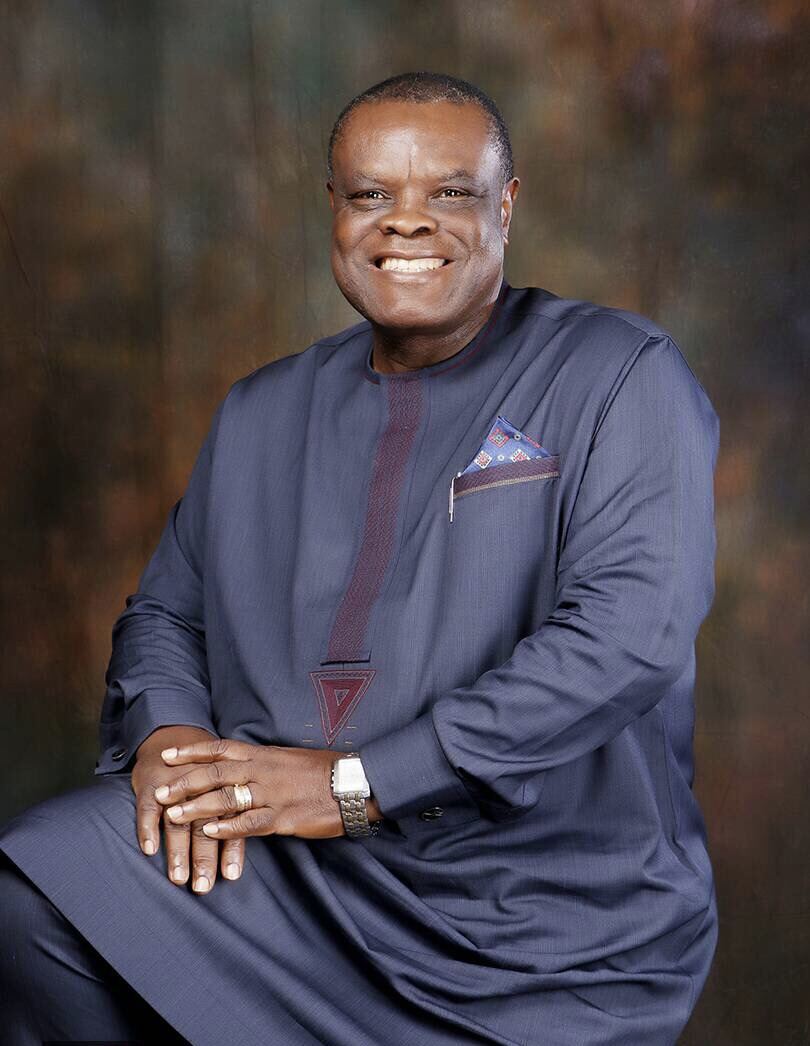
- Azubuko Udah in 2017

Chairman, Nigerian Police Force Microfinance Bank
- Incumbent
- Assumed office 2015

Deputy Inspector General of Police (Administration)
- In office 2010–2012

Assistant Inspector General of Police (Zone 2)
- In office 2007–2010

Personal details
- Born: October 26, 1954 (age 71) Abia State
- Party: All Progressives Congress
- Education: University of Ibadan (B.Sc); University of Calabar (LL.B); Nigerian Law School; University of Jos (LL.M); National Institute of Policy and Strategic Studies (mni)
- Occupation: Lawyer, Politician

Azubuko Joel Udah is a retired Deputy Inspector General of Police. He is notable for conceptualising the amnesty program which brought about the disarmament of Niger-Delta militants during the Umaru Musa Yar'Adua government.

DIG Udah (rtd.) currently serves as Chairman & Chief Executive Officer of Idyllic Farms Ltd. and Chairman of the Nigerian Police Force (NPF) Microfinance Bank.

He is also Member of National Organization of Black Law Enforcement Executives, Member of National Institute For Policy & Strategic Studies, Principal at Azubuko Udah & Co., Member of Nigerian Bar Association, Member of International Association of Chiefs of Police, Inc. and Member of International Bar Association.

== Biography ==
Udah, a native of Ozuitem, Abia State was born on the 26th of October 1954. After a brief delay in his education due to the Nigerian Civil War, Udah attended National High School, Aba and eventually graduated from Government College Umuahia. He subsequently gained admission into the prestigious University of Ibadan to study Political science.

== Education ==
Udah holds a Bachelor of Science (B.Sc.) in Political Science (1978) from the University of Ibadan and a Bachelor in Law degree (LL.B) from the University of Calabar.

Udah attended the Nigerian Law School Lagos and was called to the Nigerian Bar in 2000.

He also holds a master's degree in law (LL.M) from University of Jos. Udah is also a graduate of the National Institute of Policy and Strategic Studies in Kuru, Nigeria.

== Career ==
Udah joined the Nigeria Police Force as a cadet Assistant Superintendent of Police in 1979.

As a Police Officer, he had served in different formations of the Force and rose to the rank of Deputy Inspector General of Police in 2010 having headed several Police Commands. Udah has served in virtually all 36 States of the federation. He was a member of the Presidential Planning Committee on the amnesty program.

Udah headed various offices as a career police officer. One of his roles was as Commissioner of Police in Yobe, Borno, Benue, and Akwa Ibom States, as well as Commissioner of police, Interpol.

He also worked as Assistant Inspector General of Police Zone 5 in Benin, Zone 12 in Calabar, and Zone 2 in Lagos. Udah was also Deputy Inspector General of Police, 'A' Department (Finance and Administration) Abuja

During the 2011 general elections, Udah was temporarily redeployed to oversee election activities in the North Central Geopolitical zone comprising Benue, Kogi, Nasarawa, Kwara, Plateau, and the Federal Capital Territory.

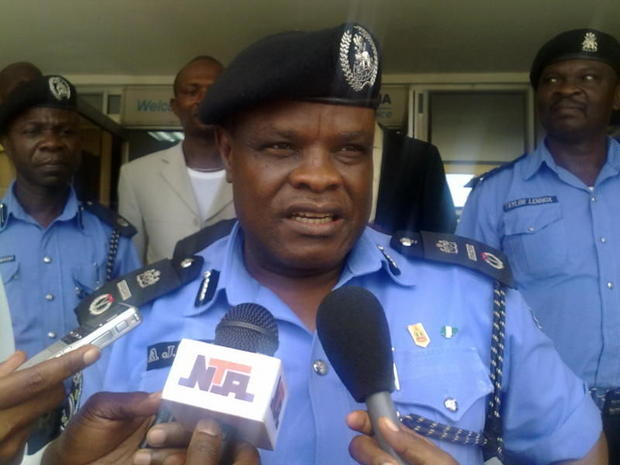
Udah addressing newsmen (Lagos, 2010)

Mr. Udah is a prominent member of several professional bodies among which are Nigerian Bar Association, International Bar Association, International Association of Chiefs of Police and the National Organization of Black Law Enforcement Executives.

In 2015, Udah contested to represent Abia-North Senatorial district on the platform of the People's Democratic Party.

Udah is a chieftain and active member of the All Progressives Congress, playing prominent roles in delivering both the Senatorial and House of Representatives seats for his party in the 2019 Nigerian general election.

Udah is a prominent voice in Nigerian Police matters, offering insights across different issues such as the menace of herdsmen and SARS, as well as advocating for more police funding.

On 23 July 2015, Udah was appointed as Chairman of the Nigerian Police Force Microfinance Bank.

Udah called on the Federal Government in May 2017 to check the proliferation of small arms in order to check incessant Farmers/Herdsmen clashes in the country. He declared that the situation was escalating because of the easy access both groups have to arms.

On 19 June 2021, Udah stated that "the government should... find a way of stopping this orgy of attacks on the police." The comment was in reference to the End SARS is a decentralised social movement.
