= Anambra United F.C. =

Nigerian football club

Anambra United
- Full name: Anambra United Football Club
- Founded: 1999; 27 years ago
- Ground: Ikpeazu Memorial Stadium; Onitsha, Nigeria
- Chairman: Odi Ikpeazu
- Manager: Wahab Haruna
Home colours

Anambra United Football Club was a Nigerian football club based in the city of Onitsha. They originally played games in Abakaliki from 1999 to 2008 as Ebonyi Angels FC, but the team was sold to Anambra State in March 2008 and were renamed Anambra United.

After relegation from the Nigeria National League in 2010, the team sold its slot in the Nigeria Amateur League to Westside F.C. and went on hiatus.
