= Inter Lagos F.C. =

Inter Lagos
- Full name: Inter Lagos Football Club
- Nickname: Interlawa FC
- Founded: 2023; 3 years ago
- Stadium: Mobolaji Johnson Arena
- Capacity: 10,000
- Owners: Lanre Vigo; Olumide Fayankin; Gatumi Aliyu
- CEO: Lanre Vigo
- Manager: Gabriel Adigwe
- Coach: Shakiru Biodun Giwa
- League: Nigeria National League
Home colours

Inter Lagos commonly referred to as The Pride of Lagos, is a Nigerian professional football club based in Lagos, and plays in the Nigeria National League. Inter Lagos home games are played at Mobolaji Johnson Arena in Onikan Stadium, one of Nigeria's oldest stadiums in Lagos, Inter Lagos is regarded as Sporting Lagos rival in the Lagos State Football Association since its debut in 2023.

== History ==
The club was founded in 2023 by Lanre Vigo, Olumide Fayankin, and Gatumi Aliyu. On 18 November 2023, Inter Lagos made its first debut at the 2023-24 Nigeria National League. The team started well in the league but lost its first few games. On 6 January 2024, it recorded its first home win against Gateway United by 1 goal. In the group stage of the NNL, Inter Lagos climbed to the top of its group. On 8 March 2024, the club marked International Women's Day with a special edition jersey featuring the faces of inspirational African women. On 13 March 2024, it made its first debut in the State FA Cup. The team played well in the knockout round of the Lagos State FA Cup and qualified for the 2024 Nigeria Federation Cup in its first attempt in the State FA Cup.

On 2 May 2024, Inter Lagos debuted at 2024 Nigeria Federation Cup, and won by 6 goals against May & Frank F.C. in the first round. On 22 May 2024, Inter Lagos defeated Hammola F.C. On 12 May 2024, it qualified for the Nigeria National League Super 8 promotional stage, competing against 7 clubs for the champion of the Nigeria National League after winning its last group-stage match against Ijebu United by 2 goals. On 22 May 2024, it defeated Hammola F.C. after playing penalties in the second round, and the match finished 0–0 in regulation time. On 24 May 2024, Nigeria Federation Cup released its 16 fixture in the final round with Inter Lagos competing against 15 teams. On 29 May 2024, it defeated Ikorodu City F.C. after playing penalties in the third round, and the match finished 1–1 in regulation time, and qualified for the quarter-final for the Federation Cup. On 7 February 2025, Inter Lagos sacks its head coach, Gabriel Ezema. On 16 March 2025, the club announces new partnership with Lotus Bank, as the official sponsor of their Jerssey. On 19 March 2025, Inter Lagos appointed Shakiru Biodun Giwa as the new head coach.

In the 2025 Lagos State FA Cup final, Inter Lagos claimed the championship title after a goalless draw against Ikorodu City. The match was decided by a penalty shootout, in which Inter Lagos triumphed 5–4. The team qualified for the 2025 Nigeria Federation Cup, with Ikorodu City in which the both team represented Lagos. On 16 April 2025, Akwa United defeated Inter Lagos 1–0 in the final round of the competition to secure qualification for the quarter-finals. As a result, Ikorodu City remained the only Lagos-based team to reach the semi-finals. However, their campaign ended following a goalless draw against Abakaliki, who advanced to the final after winning 5–4 in the ensuing penalty shootout.

Inter Lagos F.C. secured promotion to the Nigeria Premier Football League (NPFL) in 2026 . The club confirmed promotion after a 1–1 draw against Smart City F.C. at the Mobolaji Johnson Arena.

== League history ==
=== 2023-24:Nigeria National League ===
As of 15 June 2024

Performance						Qualification or relegation
League	Season	Apps	W	D	L	Qualification or relegation
Nigeria National League	2023-24	22	11	2	9	Nigeria National League

In the 2023–24 season of the Nigeria National League, Inter Lagos made its first debut on 18 November 2023 in the promotional group stage of the league. On 6 January 2024, the club recorded its first home win and climbed to the top of the table in Group B stage. On 12 May 2024, it qualifies for the Nigeria National League Super 8, competing against 7 clubs for the champion of the Nigeria National League to be held in Enugu from 7 June to 14 June 2024 after winning its last group-stage match against Ijebu United by 2 goals.

On 10 June 2024, Inter Lagos debuted at the Nigeria National League Super 8 playoff and lost by 1 goal to Madiba F.C. in its first appearance, and the match finished 2–1 in regulation time. Inter Lagos midfielder Uchenna Njoku was honored with the Man of the Match award by the Nigeria National League after the game. On 12 June 2024, Inter Lagos lost its second game by 1 goal to Beyond Limits F.C, and the match finished 1-0 in regulation time. The 2023-24 Nigeria National League was won by Beyond Limits F.C.

=== 2024:Lagos State FA Cup ===
As of 3 April 2024

Performance						Qualification or relegation
League	Season	Apps	W	D	L	Qualification or relegation
Lagos State FA Cup	2024	4	3	0	1	Qualification for the Nigeria Federation Cup

On 24 October 2023, Nigeria Football Federation announced dates for the state federation cup, to pick 2 clubs to represent each state, including FCT at Nigeria Federation Cup. Inter Lagos debuted on 13 March 2024 at the Lagos State FA Cup and went to the semi-finals, winning 2 - 0 against its rival Sporting Lagos F.C. on 28 March, and lost to Ikorodu City F.C. at the final by 2 goals on 31 March. On 27 March 2024, the Nigeria National League confirmed its weekend fixtures for the last week of March to resume on Tuesday, 2 April 2024, in line with the NFF's directive to conclude the 2024 Federation Cup matches on March 30th and 31st, as NNL club's like Inter Lagos will participate in the finals.

=== 2024: Nigeria Federation Cup ===
As of 6 May 2024

Performance
League	Season	Apps	W	D	L
Nigeria Federation Cup	2024	5	1 (2 p)	2	2

On 7 April 2024, the Nigeria Football Federation announced the Federation Cup play-off to begin in five cities on 11 April 2024 with Inter Lagos F.C., and Ikorodu City F.C. representing Lagos State. On 2 May 2024, Inter made its first appearance at the Nigerian Federation Cup, playing against May & Frank F.C, and winning by 6 goals. On 22 May 2024, Inter Lagos defeated Hammola F.C. after playing penalties in the second round, and the match finished 0–0 in regulation time.

== Players ==
=== First-team squad ===
Note: Flags indicate national team as defined under FIFA eligibility rules; some limited exceptions apply. Players may hold more than one non-FIFA nationality.

No.	Pos.	Nation	Player
22	GK	NGR	Faith James
3	DF	NGR	Femi Ladeinde
5	DF	NGR	Semiu Liadi
28	GK	NGR	Favour Bala
26	DF	NGR	Lawrence Noah
27	DF	NGR	Owoade Segun
32	DF	NGR	ThankGod Joseph
15	MF	NGR	Nwaigwe Pascal
8	MF	NGR	Daniel Onyia
23	MF	NGR	Chichin Akande
11	MF	NGR	Uchenna Njoku
25	FW	NGR	Omosebi Babatunde
20	FW	NGR	Obia Tony

No.	Pos.	Nation	Player
10	MF	NGR	Othuke Egbo
14	MF	NGR	Favour Aroyameh
16	MF	NGR	Godspower Akikoremowei
19	MF	NGR	Doyinsola Omotosho
12	DF	NGR	Jibrin Kashim
29	DF	NGR	Akintola Wale
6	DF	NGR	Nnamani Chisimdi
4	MF	NGR	Ifeanyi Eneh
24	MF	NGR	Dennis Mse
18	MF	NGR	Buhari Saheed
7	MF	NGR	Taheer Abubakar
17	MF	NGR	Sani Ibrahim
30	FW	NGR	Zachariah Timothy
21	FW	NGR	Emeka Sbusiso Eke

== Technical crew ==
As of 15 July 2025

Position	Name	Years
Head coach	(Nigeria) Shakiru Biodun Giwa	2025–present
Assistant coach	(Nigeria) Bamidele Johnson	2023–present
1st team coach	(Nigeria) Oluwaseun Savage	2023–present
Goalkeeper coach	(Nigeria) Jimmy Bello	2023–present
IT Coach	(Nigeria) Omokodion Gerrisyn	2023–present
Chief Scout	(Nigeria) Olasubomi Balogun	2023–present
Match analyst	(Nigeria) Oluwatosin Ademola Adekugba	2023–present
Kit Manager	(Nigeria) Udenze Henry	2023–present

== Club management ==
As of 23 May 2024

Position	Name	Years
CEO	(Nigeria) Lanre Vigo	2023–present
COO	(Nigeria) Oluwatosin Fashoyin	2023–present
DFEC	(Nigeria) Ifechukwu Okoro	2023–present

== Kit suppliers and shirt sponsors ==
Period	Kit manufacturer	Shirt sponsor
2023-2025	TBA	Vendease
2024-	Sèon Sports	Lotus Bank
