= Ikpeazu Memorial Stadium =

Multi-use stadium in Onitsha, Nigeria

Coordinates: 6.15595°N 6.79793°E

Chuba Ikpeazu Memorial Stadium is a 5,000 capacity multi-use stadium in Onitsha, Nigeria and was built in 2009. It is currently the home stadium of Anambra Pillars F.C. and Anambra United F.C.
