= John Obuh =

Nigerian football manager

Personal information
- Full name: John Sam Obuh
- Date of birth: 21 March 1960 (age 66)
- Place of birth: Ohafia, Nigeria

Senior career*
Years	Team	Apps	(Gls)
- Abiola Babes
- Calabar Rovers
- Udoji United

Managerial career
- Niger Tornadoes
- 2008–2009: Kwara United
- 2009: Nigeria U-17
- 2010–2012: Sharks F.C.
- 2010–2013: Nigeria U-20
- 2013–2016: Enugu Rangers
- 2016–2018: Kwara United
- 2019 –: Akwa United F.C.
Medal record
Men's football
Representing Nigeria (as manager)
FIFA U-17 World Cup
Runner-up	2009
Africa U-20 Cup of Nations
Winner	2011
Bronze medal – third place	2013
- * Club domestic league appearances and goals

John Sam Obuh is a Nigerian football coach. He was most recently the coach of Akwa United F.C. He was in charge of Nigeria's under-17 national team during the 2009 FIFA U-17 World Cup after leaving Kwara United due to a contract dispute. On 20 July 2013 Obuh resigned as Manager of the Nigerian under-20 team. On 29 October 2013 Obuh became the Manager of Enugu Rangers. Obuh was later sacked as manager of Enugu Rangers and was replaced by Kelechi Emeteole. Obuh was again appointed manager of Kwara United on 16 January 2016. In August 2019, Obuh was appointed Technical adviser and head coach of Akwa United, replacing Rafael Everton.

On 16 December 2019, John Obuh resigned his position as technical adviser of the Nigeria Professional Football League (NPFL), campaigners, Akwa United of Uyo.

== Coaching Honors ==
- 2009 FIFA U-17 World Cup- Runners-up
- 2010 WAFU Club Championship- Champion (with Sharks F.C.)
