= Paul Aigbogun =

Nigerian football manager

Personal information
- Date of birth: 1972 (age 53–54)
- Place of birth: Nigeria

Senior career*
Years	Team	Apps	(Gls)
2002	Northern Nevada Aces	6	(0)
2003–2005	Nevada Wonders	28	(0)
2007–2008	San Francisco Seals	1	(0)

Managerial career
- -2005: Nevada Wonders
- San Francisco Seals
- 2010–2012: Warri Wolves
- 2014–2016: Warri Wolves
- 2016–2018: Enyimba International
- 2018–2020: Nigeria U-20
- 2020: Glacis United
- 2022: Jammerbugt
- * Club domestic league appearances and goals

Paul Aigbogun is a Nigerian football manager.

== Career ==
For the 2002 season, Aigbogun signed for American third division club Northern Nevada Aces, before spending the rest of his playing career in the United States with lower league sides Nevada Wonders and San Francisco Seals.

After retiring, he had 2 spells as head coach of Warri Wolves in the Nigerian top flight.

In 2016, he was appointed head coach of Enyimba International, the most successful Nigerian team. From there, Aigbogun was appointed head coach of the Nigeria under-20 national team.

In 2019, he was accused of receiving bribes from players to be selected for the Nigeria under-20 national team.

In August 2022 he was named new manager of Danish 2nd Division side Jammerbugt FC.
