= Vandrezzer FC =

- Full name: Vandrezzer Football Club
- Nickname: Lions of Naija
- Founded: 2019; 7 years ago
- Stadium: Uyo Township Stadium, Uyo
- Capacity: 8,000
- Owner: Joe Udofia
- Manager: Olanrewaju Yemi
- League: Nigeria National League
- Website: https://www.vandrezzerfc.com/
Home colours	Away colours

Vandrezzer Football Club was a professional football club in Lagos state, Nigeria, that competed in the Nigeria National League, the second tier of Nigerian Professional Football League. The club was dissolved in September 2024.

Founded in 2019, the club joined the Nigerian National League and played at Agege Stadium since (formerly at Ikot Ikpene Township Stadium) its formation. Vandrezzer FC established itself as a major force in Nigeria with the introduction of pre-match activities, live match streaming and commentary, selling of regular and premium match day and seasonal tickets, the introduction of lounges and suite in the executive box sections, implementation of top-notch sound systems in the stadium and others, as they aim to redefine the dynamics of club football in Nigeria.

== History ==
After four years of sponsoring the Joe Udofia Cup, a grassroots football tournament played every year-end in Ibiono Ibom, Akwa Ibom State, Nigeria, Vandrezzer Energy Services Limited decided to set up a proper football club.

Consequently, the company purchased playing right for Vandrezzer FC in Nigeria club second-tier division, Nigeria National League (NNL) on September 10, 2019, with the intent of advancing to the top flight – Nigeria Professional Football League (NPFL). On September 11, 2019, a day after the slot was bought, the club was successfully registered with the Corporate Affairs Commission (CAC), as a sports business outfit under the Vandrezzer Group of Companies. The official unveiling of the club to the public, including the pioneer head coach Rafael Everton(Brazil) and his technical crew, the backroom staff, and all registered players for the inaugural season, took place on November 24, 2019, at St. Theresa Primary School, Use Abat, Ibiono-Ibom in Akwa Ibom State. The Lions made their NNL debut on November 30, 2019, in a 1–0 away defeat to J. Atete FC of Ughelli, Delta State. The first league goal was scored by Ekerete Udom in the 65th minute of the 2–0 home win against Bayelsa United.

In 2019, the leadership of Vandrezzer FC announced their plan to construct a 5,000 capacity stadium in Ibiono, a local government in Akwa-Ibom state. Vandrezzer relocated to Lagos in January 2021.

On March 1 Vandrezzer F.C. media announced the resignation of the head coach Rafael Everton, his assistant Jose Israel and Alberico Da Silva, have all left the club

Vandrezzer FC became the first Nigerian football club with 1 million Facebook followers.

== Honours ==
- Lagos FA Cup: 1

2021

== Stadium ==
Vandrezzer FC played their home matches at the Teslim Balogun Stadium, Lagos. They use the Uyo Township Stadium for home games.

== Squad ==
As of December 9, 2021

Note: Flags indicate national team as defined under FIFA eligibility rules; some limited exceptions apply. Players may hold more than one non-FIFA nationality.

No.	Pos.	Nation	Player
1	GK	NGA	Paul Emenike
18	GK	NGA	Obinna Akuchie
26	GK	NGA	Daniel Eyibio

No.	Pos.	Nation	Player
2	CB	NGA	Godwin Ekpo
15	CB	NGA	Owolabi Ibrahim
6	CB	NGA	Bassey Odiong
12	RB	NGA	Samuel Edoho
16	RB	NGA	David Edet
3	LB	NGA	Kingsley Akpan
22	LB	NGA	Oloye Felix

No.	Pos.	Nation	Player
21	DM	NGA	Abasifreke Udoh
17	DM	NGA	Popoola Kabiru
4	DM	NGA	Anas Hassan
10	AM	NGA	Isaac Saviour
32	AM	NGA	Fawaz Otun

No.	Pos.	Nation	Player
14	FW	NGA	Elisha Jonah
7	FW	NGA	Gideon Monday
8	FW	NGA	Saheed Obisesan
38	FW	NGA	Chukwuebuka Ogbonna
11	FW	NGA	Olalekan Abdulsalam
19	FW	NGA	Somtochukwu Abraham
25	FW	NGA	Victor Akraa
