= Solomon Ogbeide =

Nigerian football coach (died 2019)

Personal information
- Date of death: 20 May 2019

Managerial career
- Years: Team
- 2013: Warri Wolves
- 2015: Bayelsa United
- 2019: Lobi Stars

Solomon Ogbeide (died 20 May 2019) was a Nigerian football coach who coached club sides including Warri Wolves, Bayelsa United, and Lobi Stars.
