= Rafael Everton =

Brazilian association football coach (born 1989)

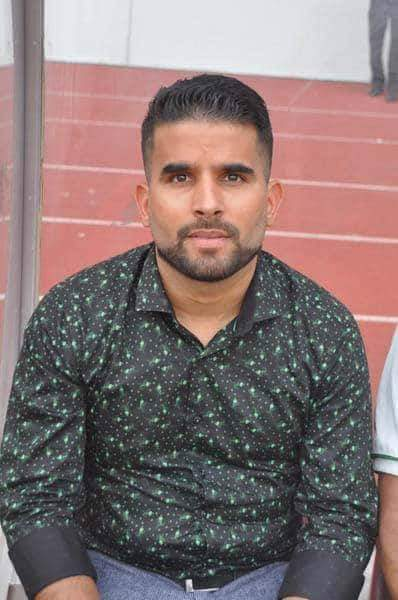

Personal information
- Full name: Rafael Everton Lira
- Date of birth: 27 January 1989 (age 37)
- Place of birth: Recife, Brazil

Team information
- Current team: Vandrezzer FC

Managerial career
- Years: Team
- 2016–2017: Ifeanyi Ubah F.C.
- 2017–2018: Abia Warriors F.C.
- 2018–2019: Akwa United F.C.
- 2019–2021: Vandrezzer FC
- 2024–: Notch

Rafael Everton Lira (born 27 January 1989 in Recife, Brazil) is a Brazilian professional football coach and manager. He was the former head coach of the Nigerian Professional Football League club Akwa United F.C. He was appointed coach of Akwa United F.C. on 5 November 2018. He has resigned from the head coach of Nigeria National League club, Vandrezzer FC.

== Early life and education ==
Lira was born in Recife, Brazil in 1989. He grew up in Recife where he was actively playing football. Lira attended the Centro Universitário do Alto Vale do Itajaí in Brazil where he studied Physical Education and obtained a BSc in Physical Education in 2013.

== Professional career ==
=== Playing career ===
Lira was a footballer before going into coaching. He has played for Fluminense and Sport Club do Recife. Due to a consistent injury he retired from playing and went into coaching.

=== Coaching career ===
Rafael Everton started his coaching career as an intern at the São Paulo FC in São Paulo, Brazil. He was subsequently the head coach of West Ham Inglaterra. In 2015, he coached Fluminense SC where he helped his team to second place in the Catarinense Serie B.

In 2016, he moved to Nigeria and signed his first Nigerian deal with Nigerian Professional Football League team Ifeanyi Ubah F.C. In November 2016, he coached Ifeanyi Ubah F.C to win the first federation cup title in Nigeria. He is the first youngest club manager to win a Federation cup in Nigeria at the age of 27. Immediately after winning the FA cup for Ifeanyi Ubah F.C. in November 2016, he quit the NPFL team after he was offered a "lesser role" in management. He was offered the role of assistant coach which he rejected and former Accra Hearts of Oak manager Kenichi Yatsuhashi was appointed to replace him.

On 6 January 2017, Kenichi Yatsuhashi quit Ifeanyi Ubah F.C. and Lira was re-appointed manager of the NPFL team. Barely two months after he was re-appointed head coach, Lira offered his resignation again to the team stating that "Instructions on players selection is forced on the coach and this for me isn't professional. I resigned because I don't like this at all. The current style at IfeanyiUbah is unprofessional." On 12 October 2017, he was hired by Abia Warriors F.C. to replace Abdullahi Biffo.

On 5 November 2018, he was officially unveiled as the manager of Akwa United F.C.

=== Contract termination from Akwa United F.C. ===
On 4 July 2019, Everton announced on his official social media page that his contract has been terminated by Akwa United F.C. barely one month after he was suspended. According to media reports, Everton was told to withdraw during the Super 6 playoffs few hours before the match against Enyimba. Everton accused the chairman of Akwa United Paul Bassey for interfering with his duties as coach, saying that the chairman on several occasions chose players for matches. Rafael Everton had earlier planned to resign but was persuaded by players to stay.

== Achievements ==
- Youngest club manager to win a Federation cup in Nigeria for Ifeanyi Ubah F.C.
- Champions of Champions 2017 Nigéria
- Four-time state Champion Nigéria.
- In Notch of Suriname 18 games without losing
