= Zaria Township Stadium =

Stadium in Zaria, Nigeria

Coordinates: 8°9′21″N 7°38′28″E

Zaria Township Stadium is a multi-use stadium in the Samaru neighborhood of Zaria, Nigeria. It is currently used mostly for football matches and is the temporary home for Kaduna United F.C. The stadium holds 10,000 people.
