= Gbenga Ogunbote =

Nigerian football coach

Personal information
- Full name: Gbenga Ogunbote
- Place of birth: Nigeria

Managerial career
- Years: Team
- 2012: Sunshine Stars
- 2012–2016: Shooting Stars
- 2016–2017: Enyimba
- 2017–2019: Enugu Rangers
- 2019–2020: Lobi Stars
- 2020–2021: Sunshine Stars
- 2021-2022: Remo Stars
- 2023-2025: Shooting Stars
- 2025- date: Plateau United

Gbenga Ogunbote (born in Ogun State, Nigeria) is a Nigerian football coach.

== Career ==
On 12 July 2012 he was appointed to coach Sunshine Stars F.C. He has also managed reputable teams such as Enyimba F.C. and Shooting Stars.

On 30 October 2017 he was announced new coach of Enugu Rangers.
