= Smart City F.C. =

Nigerian football club

- Full name: Smartcity Football Club
- Chairman: Anthony Adeyinka Adeboye
- League: Nigeria National League

Smart City F.C. is a Nigerian football club based in Lagos state. They play in the Nigeria national league (NNL), a second division of Nigeria football league. Their home matches are played at the Onikan Stadium. The chairman of the club is Anthony Adeyinka Adeboye.
