= Kada City F.C. =

Nigerian football club

- Full name: Kada City Football Club
- Founded: 2018
- Ground: Ahmadu Bello Stadium; Kaduna, Nigeria
- Capacity: 16,000
- Chairman: Inuwa Hamza
- Manager: Shehu Marouf
- League: Nigeria Premier League
- 2018: 1st, Nigeria National League

Kada City Football Club is a Nigerian football club based in Kaduna currently competing in the second tier of the Nigeria football league, Nigeria National League

== History ==
Kada City was created to promote development of football within Kaduna state. They had their official unveiling ceremony in February 2018.

Kada City won the 2018 Nigeria National League promotion playoff over Bendel Insurance F.C. and made their Nigeria Premier League debut in 2019.

== Current team ==
As of 8 August 2022

Note: Flags indicate national team as defined under FIFA eligibility rules; some limited exceptions apply. Players may hold more than one non-FIFA nationality.

| No. | Pos. | Nation | Player |
|---|---|---|---|
| 3 | | NGA | Promise Onuh |
| 4 | DF | NGA | Ekene Obi |
| 5 | DF | NGA | Osita Egbo |
| 6 | | NGA | Pascal Eze |
| 8 | | NGA | Nura Mohammed |
| 11 | DF | NGA | Papa Idris |
| 12 | DF | NGA | Felix Benjamin |
| 13 | MF | GHA | Richard Yamoah |
| 14 | DF | NGA | Jamilu Coker |
| 15 | FW | NGA | Kabiru Adewale |

| No. | Pos. | Nation | Player |
|---|---|---|---|
| 17 | | NGA | Anayo Iwuala |
| 18 | | NGA | Abdulakeem Adeyemo |
| 19 | FW | NGA | Sadiq Suleiman |
| 22 | GK | NGA | Bobai Daniel |
| 23 | | NGA | Anthony Micheal |
| 24 | | NGA | Ozor P. Felix |
| 30 | GK | NGA | Ndukauba Sochima |
| 31 | FW | NGA | Kabiru Sanusi |
| 32 | DF | NGA | Solomon Kantoma |
| 35 | MF | NGA | Mohammed Umar |
| 37 | | NGA | Kingsley Ezeali |
| 40 | | NGA | Shola Collins |
