= Papa Idris =

Nigerian footballer

Personal information
- Date of birth: 27 July 1989 (age 37)
- Place of birth: Nigeria
- Height: 1.95 m (6 ft 5 in)
- Position: Centre back

Senior career*
| Years | Team | Apps | (Gls) |
| 2006–2011 | Kaduna United | 15 | (0) |
| 2012–2013 | Kano Pillars | 51 | (1) |
| 2013 | Kilmarnock | 0 | (0) |
| 2014–2015 | Gombe United | 72 | (3) |
| 2016 | Plateau United | 87 | (2) |
| 2019 | Kada City | 8 | (0) |
| 2019–2021 | Jigawa Golden Stars | 24 | (0) |

International career^{‡}
| 2012– | Nigeria | 3 | (0) |
- * Club domestic league appearances and goals as of 3 May 2012 ‡ National team caps and goals as of 15 August 2012

Papa Idris (born 27 July 1989) is a Nigerian footballer who plays as a central defender.

== Club career ==
Idris started playing as a senior for Kaduna United and Kano Pillars.

On 28 March 2013, it was announced that he and compatriot Reuben Gabriel would join Scottish Premier League side Kilmarnock as free agents, and both signed three-year deals the following week.

Idris' contract was terminated in late June 2013, without him having made one single official appearance. The move was confirmed by the club three months later, and he returned to his homeland by joining Gombe United for one year.

After a spell with Kada City in 2019, Idris then moved to Jigawa Golden Stars where he played for 2 seasons.
