= Sardauna Memorial Stadium =

Sports venue in Gusau, Nigeria

Coordinates: 12°09′51″N 6°40′06″E

The Sardauna Memorial Stadium is a multi-use stadium in Gusau, Zamfara State, Nigeria. It is currently used mostly for football matches and is the home stadium of Zamfara United F.C. of the Nigerian Premier League. The stadium has a capacity of 5,000 people.

When Katsina United F.C. were re-established in 2009, they played the first half of their first season at the Sardauna Stadium before moving to the new Muhammadu Dikko Stadium in Katsina.
