= Kadiri Ikhana =

Nigerian footballer and coach

Personal information
- Date of birth: 31 December 1951 (age 74)
- Place of birth: Ilorin, Nigeria
- Height: 1.67 m (5 ft 6 in)
- Position: Midfielder

Senior career*
Years	Team	Apps	(Gls)
- Bendel Insurance

International career
- Nigeria

Managerial career
- El-Kanemi Warriors
- BCC Lions
- Kwara United
- Sunshine Stars
- Sharks
- Giwa
- 1995: Mohammedan
- 2003: Enyimba
- 2004: Nigeria Olympic
- 2008: Kano Pillars
- 2012: Nigeria women
- 2013: Nasarawa United
- 2014–2015: Enyimba
- 2016: Shooting Stars
- 2016–2017: Kano Pillars
- * Club domestic league appearances and goals

Kadiri Ikhana (born 31 December 1951) is a Nigerian football coach and former player who last managed Kano Pillars.

== Playing career ==
Ikhana played as a midfielder for Bendel Insurance, winning the league in 1979 and the FA Cup in 1978 and 1980.

Ikhana represented Nigeria at international level, playing for them in FIFA World Cup qualifying matches at the 1980 Summer Olympic Games. He won the 1980 African Cup of Nations with Nigeria.

== Coaching career ==
Ikhana has coached a number of Nigerian club sides, including El-Kanemi Warriors, BCC Lions, Kwara United, Sunshine Stars, Sharks and Giwa.

In 1995, he managed Mohammedan SC in Bangladesh, before being sacked for a poor run of results in the league.

Ikhana managed Nigeria's Enyimba, winning the African Champions League in 2003. He was awarded CAF's Coach of the Year that same year. In 2004, he was manager of the Nigerian men's Olympic team.

He later managed Kano Pillars, before resigning in May 2008, citing corruption in the sport. He had led Kano Pillars to their first ever league title a day earlier.

He was appointed manager of the Nigerian women's national team in April 2012, before resigning in November 2012.

He was managing Nasarawa United in November 2013 when he decided to retire from the sport. He returned to Enyimba, winning another league title, before moving to Shooting Stars in February 2016. He returned to Kano Pillars in November 2016, before being sacked in April 2017.

== Honours ==
=== As a player ===
With Bendel Insurance

- Nigerian Premier League – 1979
- Nigerian FA Cup – 1978, 1980

With Nigeria

- African Cup of Nations – 1980

=== As a coach ===
With Enyimna

- Nigerian Premier League – 2015
- CAF Champions League – 2003

With Kano Pillars

- Nigerian Premier League – 2008

=== Individual ===
- CAF Coach of the Year – 2003
