= JUTH F.C. =

Nigerian football club

JUTH
- Full name: Jos University Teaching Hospital Football Club
- Nickname: Healers
- Founded: 1986; 40 years ago
- Ground: Rwang Pam Stadium
- Capacity: 25,000
- Coach: Babawo
- League: Nigeria National League
Home colours	Away colours

JUTH FC (abbreviation for Jos University Teaching Hospital Football Club) was a Nigerian football club from Jos playing in the Nigeria National League.

== History ==
They played at the Rwang Pam Stadium, with a capacity of 15 000. Due to the 2010 Jos riots they played some home games in Lafia, Nasarawa.

After avoiding relegation from the Nigeria National League in 2013, they announced their disbandment for lack of funds. Their last record was 10 wins, 5 draws and 13 losses.
