= Ocean Boys F.C. =

Nigerian football club

Ocean Boys
- Full name: Ocean Boys Football Club
- Nickname: Divine Warriors
- Founded: 2002
- Ground: Yenagoa Township Stadium
- Capacity: 5,000
- Chairman: Ngo Sylva
- League: Nigeria National League
- 2012: Disqualified
| Home colours | Away colours |

Ocean Boys Football Club was a Nigerian football club based in Brass, Bayelsa State.

== History ==
Ocean Boys Football Club was founded in 2002 by Sylva Nathaniel Ngo, the chairman of Brass Local Government. Sylva formed the team to help curb the restiveness among youths in the Niger Delta and "keep the youths away from vices by channelling their energies into worthy endeavours." They were promoted to the top division in Nigerian football, the Nigerian Premier League within three years and were the 2006 league champions in their first season. They won the 2008 FA Cup, the third straight title for the Niger Delta.

Their home stadium was Yenagoa Township Stadium but for the 2009–10 season played some home games at Samuel Ogbemudia Stadium in Benin City.

In December 2010 the team was left in shock by the death of defender Emmanuel Ogoli, who collapsed during a game, and a horrendous car crash in which defender Okechukwu Akabogu and third choice keeper Austino Egbe sustained severe injuries. They were disqualified from the Premier League and relegated in 2012 for not fulfilling their fixtures. All games involving them were thrown out and the league table recalculated. They were admitted after debate into the National League and changed their name to Divine Warriors F.C. However, after nine games (and just two wins) in the 2013 season manager Ada Gwegwe resigned, and due to finances the team sold their slot in the league to Fountain F.C. before going on hiatus.

== Achievements ==
- Nigerian Premier League: 1

2006.

- Nigerian FA Cup: 1

2008.

- Nigerian Super Cup: 1

2006.

== Performance in CAF competitions ==
- CAF Champions League: 1 appearance

2007 - Preliminary Round

- CAF Confederation Cup: 1 appearance

2009 - First Round

== Staff ==
Manager TBA

Media officer

- Eddy Ohis Asein

Head coach

- Larry Eteli

== Former coaches ==
- (Belgium) Maurice Cooreman (2006)
- (Nigeria) Tunde Disu (2007)
- (Nigeria) Lucky Igadi (????)
- (Nigeria) Evans Ogenyi (2008–09)
- (Nigeria) Lawrence Akpokona (2009)
- (Nigeria) Emmanuel Amuneke (2009–??)
- (Nigeria) Samson Unuanuel (2011–12)
- (Nigeria) Ada Gwegwe (2012–13)
