= Samson Siasia Sports Stadium =

Multi-use stadium in Yenagoa, Nigeria

Coordinates: 4°55′58″N 6°16′0″E

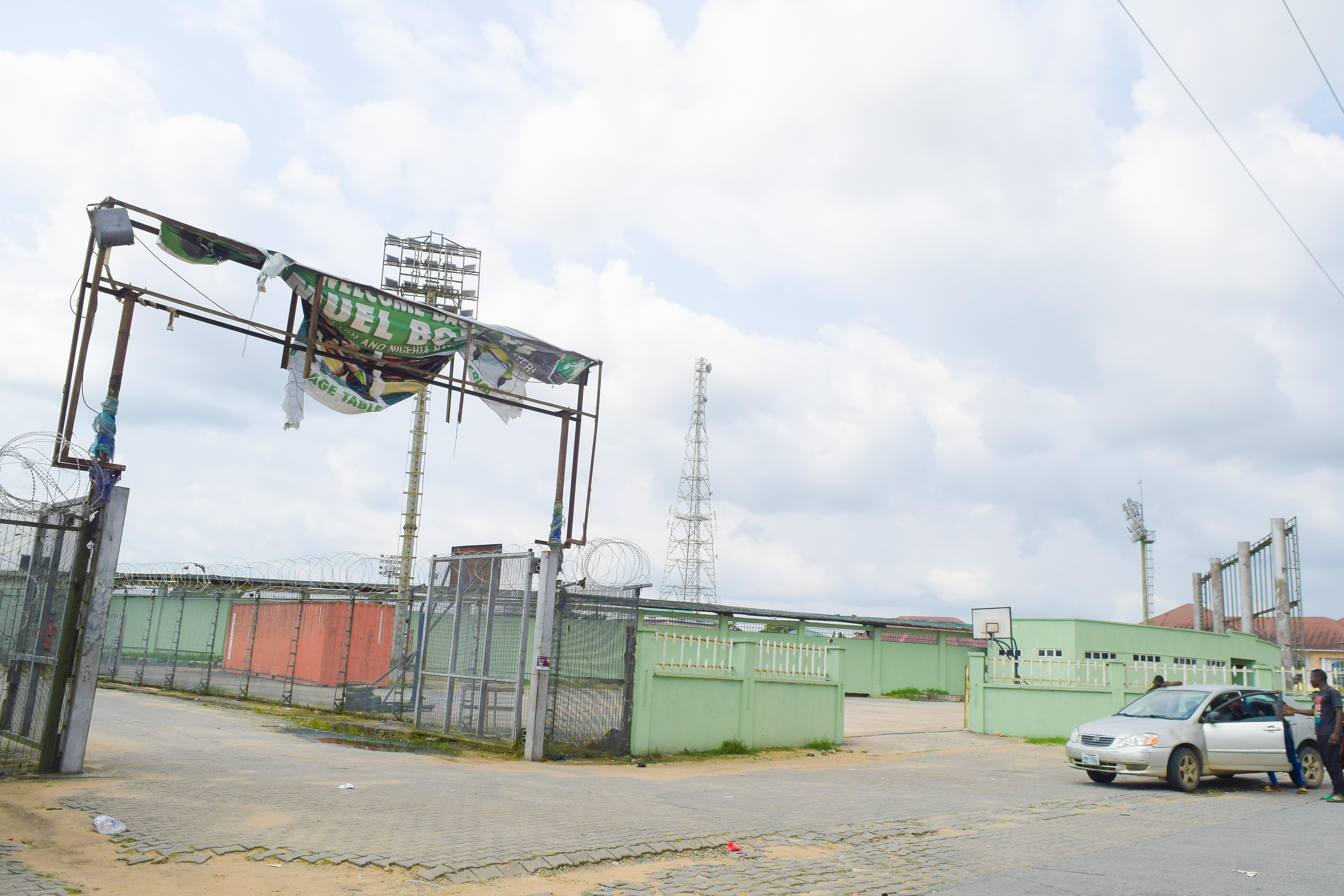
Yenagoa Township Stadium, Bayelsa

Samson Siasia Sports Stadium is a multi-use stadium located in the Yenagoa metropolis, Nigeria. It is currently used mostly for football matches and it is the home stadium of both Ocean Boys FC and the Bayelsa United. The stadium has a capacity of 5,000 people. Before 2009, it was known as the Yenagoa Township Stadium. It was rededicated in 2009 and was named after Samson Siasia. Samson Siasia is a former Nigerian soccer player who has coached a number of teams and recorded a number of successes. The Samson Siasia Stadium is the first environmentally friendly astro turf pitch in Africa. The astro turf pitch was built by Monimichelle Sports Facility Construction and Development Ltd.
