= Akure Township Stadium =

Multi-use stadium in Nigeria

- Interactive map of Akure Township Stadium
- Location: Akure, Nigeria
- Coordinates: 7°15′31″N 5°11′23″E
- Capacity: 2,806

Tenant
- Sunshine Stars F.C.

Akure Township Stadium is a multi-use stadium in Akure, Nigeria. It is currently used mostly for football matches and is the home stadium of Sunshine Stars F.C. of the Nigerian Premier League. The stadium has a capacity of 5,000 spectators.
