= Zamfara United F.C. =

Nigerian football club

Zamfara United
- Full name: Zamfara United Football Club
- Founded: 2001
- Ground: Sardauna Memorial Stadium; Gusau, Nigeria
- Capacity: 5,000
- Chairman: Alhaji Shehu Garba Gusau
Away colours

Zamfara United Football Club is a Nigerian football club based in the town of Gusau, Zamfara State.

== History ==
Before the 2008–09 season, there was a brief power struggle for the chairman position that saw Shehu Gusau sacked and then retained and even arrested. They retained their place in the top league by two goals on the final day of the season thanks to a 9–0 victory over Kaduna United FC. They were relegated to the National Second Division in 2011 after a five-year stay in the Premier League.

In June 2013, they withdrew from the league with six games left after they ran out of money following a banishment to Sokoto. They were at the bottom of the table with a record of five wins four ties and 15 losses. The club was disbanded by the state government. In 2015 the state government applied to be readmitted to the Nigeria National League.

=== Bus crash ===
Tragedy struck the club on February 20, 2009, when the team's bus collided head-on with a car critically injuring several players and officials. The team's curator, Ado Umar, died instantly. A recently signed player, Abdullahi Sabiu, died on the following day. Five clubs Kano Pillars, Enyimba, Julius Berger, Gombe United, Wikki Tourists gave a total of seven players on free transfers to help Zamfara complete their season as some players were too traumatized to play.

== Achievements ==
- National Second Division: 1

2006
