= Taraba F.C. =

Nigerian football club

Taraba FC
- Full name: Taraba United Football Club
- Founded: 2007; 18 years ago
- Ground: Jalingo City Stadium; Jalingo, Taraba, Nigeria
- Capacity: 12,000
- Chairman: Tijani Babangida
- Manager: Ikuomola Olatoye Omosebi
- League: Nigeria Premier League
- 2015: 19th (relegated)
| Home colours | Away colours |

Taraba F.C. is a Nigerian football club based in Jalingo, Taraba. They played in the top-tier division in Nigerian football, the Nigeria Premier League after promotion in 2013 until a last place finish in 2015. Until 2007, they were based in Abuja and were named SEC (Securities & Exchange Commission) Football Club.

== Current squad ==
Note: Flags indicate national team as defined under FIFA eligibility rules; some limited exceptions apply. Players may hold more than one non-FIFA nationality.

| No. | Pos. | Nation | Player |
|---|---|---|---|
| 2 | | (Nigeria) NGA | Hashimu Haliru |
| 4 | | (Nigeria) NGA | Lucky Irimiya |
| 5 | | (Nigeria) NGA | Austine Obiora |
| 7 | MF | (Nigeria) NGA | Abdulmalik Mohammed |
| 8 | | (Nigeria) NGA | Abel Bobby |
| 9 | | (Nigeria) NGA | Aminu Abubakar |
| 10 | MF | (Nigeria) NGA | Solar Izuakor |
| 13 | | (Nigeria) NGA | Ahmed Nura Yunusa |
| 14 | | (Nigeria) NGA | Hussaini Adaji |
| 16 | | (Nigeria) NGA | Osita Echendu |

| No. | Pos. | Nation | Player |
|---|---|---|---|
| 18 | | (Nigeria) NGA | Chinedu Kawawa |
| 20 | | (Nigeria) NGA | Monday Amade |
| 24 | | (Nigeria) NGA | Olusola Oladele Ajala |
| 26 | | (Nigeria) NGA | Precious Omodu Nnamdi |
| 29 | FW | (Nigeria) NGA | Fidelis Saviour |
| 33 | | (Nigeria) NGA | Anyu Adada Andrew |
| 35 | GK | (Nigeria) NGA | Richard Ochayi |
| — | GK | (Nigeria) NGA | Ibrahim Pius |
| — | DF | (Nigeria) NGA | Stanley Onuegbu |
| — | FW | (Nigeria) NGA | Luther Iyorhe |
