= Jalingo City Stadium =

Multi-use stadium in Jalingo, Nigeria

Coordinates: 8°57′4″N 11°21′16.33″E

The Jolly Nyame Stadium is a multi-use stadium in Jalingo, Nigeria. It is currently used mostly for football matches and is home for Taraba FC. The stadium holds 12,000 people and was built in 2002. It was named after the then Executive Governor of the state, Hon. Jolly Nyame.
