= Rwang Pam Stadium =

Stadium in Jos, Nigeria

Coordinates: 9°57′5″N 8°51′59″E

Rwang Pam Township Stadium is a multi-use stadium in Jos, Nigeria. It is used mostly for football matches and is the home stadium of Jos teams Plateau United, Pepsi F.A. and Mighty Jets F.C.. It was also the home stadium for the defunct JUTH F.C.. The stadium has a capacity of 15,000 spectators.

== Location ==
Rwang Pam Township Stadium is located at Ibrahim Dasuki Street, Off Zaria Bypass, Jos, Nigeria.

== Transport ==
The means of transport available for reaching stadium include cars, buses and bikes.

== Uses ==
The stadium is now primarily used for football matches. It was previously used for track events also.
