= Sani Abacha Stadium =

Sports venue in Kano, Nigeria

- Interactive map of Sani Abacha Stadium
- Location: Kano, Nigeria
- Coordinates: 11°59′59″N 8°31′45″E
- Owner: Nigerian Government
- Capacity: 16,000
- Surface: Grass

Construction
- Opened: 1998

Tenant
- Kano Pillars

The Sani Abacha Stadium is a multi-purpose stadium in Kano, Kano State, Nigeria. It is mostly used for football matches and athletics. The stadium is the home of Nigeria Professional Football League (NPFL) side Kano Pillars F.C. The stadium has a capacity of 16,000 and is named after General Sani Abacha, the deceased former military head of state.

The stadium has hosted several international competitions including the 2000 African Cup of Nations and the 2009 FIFA U-17 World Cup.

During the 2017 NPFL season, Kano Pillars drew an average home attendance of 10,000 the highest ever recorded in the Nigerian league.

== Football tournaments hosted ==
=== 1999 FIFA World Youth Championship ===
Date	Team 1	Result	Team 2	Attendance	Round
5 April 1999	Cameroon	2–1	Japan	12,000	Group E
5 April 1999	England	0–1	United States	19,000	Group E
8 April 1999	Cameroon	1–0	England	12,000	Group E
14 April 1999	Republic of Ireland	1–1 (a.e.t.) (3–5 p)	Nigeria	20,000	Round of 16

=== 2000 African Cup of Nations ===
Date	Team 1	Result	Team 2	Attendance	Round
23 January 2000	Egypt	2–0	Zambia	18,000	Group C
25 January 2000	Burkina Faso	1–3	Senegal	12,000	Group C
28 January 2000	Egypt	1–0	Senegal	30,000	Group C
29 January 2000	Zambia	1–1	Burkina Faso	5,000	Group C
1 February 2000	Egypt	4–2	Burkina Faso	17,000	Group C
3 February 2000	Tunisia	1–0	Congo	12,000	Group D
7 February 2000	Egypt	0–1	Tunisia	12,000	Quarterfinal

=== 2009 FIFA U-17 World Cup ===
Date	Team 1	Result	Team 2	Attendance	Round
26 October 2009	United Arab Emirates	2–0	Malawi	8,500	Group E
26 October 2009	Spain	2–1	United States	19,500	Group E
29 October 2009	United States	1–0	Malawi	9,000	Group E
29 October 2009	United Arab Emirates	1–3	Spain	20,000	Group E
1 November 2009	Malawi	1–4	Spain	7,000	Group E
1 November 2009	Italy	0–0	Uruguay	20,000	Group F
5 November 2009	Spain	4–1	Burkina Faso	14,000	Round of 16

== See also ==
- List of football stadiums in Nigeria
- Lists of stadiums
