= Yakubu Gowon Stadium =

Football stadium in Port Harcourt, Nigeria

- Interactive map of Yakubu Gowon Stadium
- Former names: Liberation Stadium
- Location: Port-Harcourt
- Coordinates: 4.8248°N 7.0216°E
- Capacity: 16,000

Construction
- Renovated: 1998
- Expanded: 2001

Tenant
- Rivers United

Yakubu Gowon Stadium (formerly Liberation Stadium) is a multi-purpose stadium in the Elekahia suburb of Port Harcourt, Nigeria. It is currently used mostly for football matches and is the home stadium of Rivers United F.C., formerly Dolphins F.C. The stadium has a capacity of 16,000.

In 2015, it was renamed after former military head of state, General Yakubu Gowon.

== Events ==
=== 1999 FIFA World Youth Championship ===
Date	Team 1	Result	Team 2	Attendance	Round
8 April 1999	Honduras	0–3	Brazil	16,000	Group F
11 April 1999	Zambia	1–5	Brazil	16,000	Group F
11 April 1999	Honduras	1–3	Spain	16,000	Group F
15 April 1999	Spain	3–2	United States	15,600	Round of 16
