= Sharks F.C. =

Nigerian football team

Sharks
- Full name: Sharks Football Club
- Nickname: The Blue Angels
- Founded: 1972
- Dissolved: 2016
- Ground: Sharks Stadium
- Capacity: 5,000
- League: Nigeria National League
- 2015: 17th (relegated)
Home colours	Away colours

Sharks Football Club was a Nigerian football club based in Port Harcourt, Rivers State. They played in the top division in Nigerian football, the Nigerian Premier League. Their home stadium was Sharks Stadium although they played some of their bigger games at Liberation Stadium, which could accommodate a little over three times the spectators compared to Sharks Stadium. In 2016, the club was officially merged with city rivals Dolphin and the two teams collectively became known as Rivers United.

== History ==
Sharks were almost relocated to Abeokuta in 1998 due to crowd problems. In protest, they missed the last six games of the 1998 Professional League, finished bottom of the league on 32 points, and were suspended for two years.

=== 2009–10 ===
They started the 2009–10 season slow out of the gate, anchored to the bottom of the table and going through three managers when Kadiri Ikhana left after eight games. On 27 February 2010 they were suspended indefinitely by the league for "noncompliance of statutes" after a shakeup of their management staff. This occurred after the team was robbed in Edo State on their way back from a minicamp in Abuja. They managed to finish in 16th place with 48 points, avoiding relegation by one point.

== Merger with Dolphins ==
After relegation in 2016, the Government of Rivers State merged the Sharks F.C. with their rivals Dolphins to create Rivers United which took Dolphins' slot in the Premier League.

== Achievements ==
- West African Club Championship (UFOA Cup)
  - Winners (1): 2010
- Nigerian FA Cup
  - Runners-up (3): 1979, 2003, 2009
