= Warri Wolves F.C. =

Nigerian football club

Warri Wolves
- Full name: Warri Wolves Football Club
- Nicknames: Seasiders, Wolves
- Ground: Warri Township Stadium
- Capacity: 20,000
- Chairman: Onoriode Joshua Oborevwori
- Manager: Napoleon Aluma
- League: Nigeria National League
- 2025–26: 13th of 20
Home colours	Away colours

Warri Wolves Football Club (formerly NPA) is a Nigerian football club based in Warri, Delta State. Formerly operated by the Nigerian Ports Authority, the club was based in Lagos from 2003-2007, following its promotion to the Nigerian Premier League.

== History ==
After making the 2001 Super Four play-offs, NPA FC was relegated by three points in the next season after winning only 10 of their 34 league games. They were promoted again in 2003 after finishing second in Division 2. NPA FC ended their 2004/05 season near the bottom of the table and it was announced that 16 of their 40 players would be laid off. The team was relegated again after the 2005–06 season, and moved back to Warri in April 2007 after a deal with the government of Delta State.

The team was renamed "Warri Wolves" at the start of the season and won promotion to the 2009 Premier League season as champions of Division 1B. Wolves finished with 59 points from 18 wins, five draws and seven losses, scoring 42 goals and conceded 16. They were involved in an incident on March 8, 2008, when a pitch invasion after a goalless draw at First Bank FC left seven players and officials injured. They played the first part of the 2008–09 season in Oleh because of renovations to the Warri Stadium.

They are currently located back in Warri City and now play home matches at the Warri Township Stadium.

== Performance in CAF competitions ==
- CAF Champions League: 1 appearance

2016 – First Round

- CAF Confederation Cup: 3 appearances

2010 – First Round of 16
2012 – Second Round
2014 – Second Round

- CAF Cup: 1 appearance

2002 – First Round (as NPA)

== Staff ==
- Hassan Hamdala (Technical Adviser)
- Ukah Chukwuma (Secretary)
- Joseph Cole (Team Manager)
- Neville Ambakederemo (General Manager)
- Stafford Prince (Media Officer)
- Onoriode Joshua Oborevwori (Chairman of Delta Sports Commission)

== Coaching history ==
- (Belgium) Maurice Cooreman (Jan 2005 – Jan 2006)
- (Nigeria) Solomon Ogbeide (2008–2009)
- (Nigeria) Paul Aigbogun (Jan 2010 – Feb 2012)
- (Belgium) Maurice Cooreman (Feb 2012 – Sept 2012)
- (Nigeria) Edema Fuludu (2012)
- (Nigeria) Solomon Ogbeide (2013)
- (Nigeria) Paul Aigbogun (Jan 2014 – Jan 2016)
- (Nigeria) Sam Okpodu (Jan 2016 – Jun 2016)
- (Netherlands) Ard Sluis (2016)
- (Nigeria) Mansur Abdullahi (2016)
- (Nigeria) Ngozi Elechi (Aug 2019 – Sept 2019)
- (Nigeria) Evans Ogenyi (Sept 2019 – 2022)
- (Nigeria) Jolomi Atune (2022 – 2024)
- (Nigeria) Napoleon Aluma (2024 – present)
