= Dolphin F.C. (Nigeria) =

Nigerian football club

Dolphin
- Full name: Dolphin Football Club
- Founded: 1988 (As Eagle Cement)
- Dissolved: 2016
- Ground: Liberation Stadium; Port Harcourt, Rivers, Nigeria
- Capacity: 25,000
- Manager: Stanley Eguma
- Coach: Ndubuisi Nduka
- League: Nigeria Premier League
- 2015: 16th
Home colours	Away colours

Dolphin Football Club was a Nigerian football team based in Port Harcourt.

== History ==
The club was known until 2001 as Eagle Cement FC.

In 2004–05 the team placed 6th in the Nigerian Premier League. Representing their country in the 2005 CAF Confederation Cup, they reached the finals, losing to Morocco's FAR Rabat. They play their home games at the Liberation Stadium. However, for the 2008 Confederation Cup they played their games at U. J. Esuene Stadium in Calabar.

They were relegated from the Nigerian Premier League in 2007 by one point. They however came back to retain the FA Cup over Enugu Rangers. In their run, they twice won by penalties 4–2, including a semi-final triumph over crosstown rivals Sharks before winning the final 3–2 on penalties. They returned to the Premier League after winning their division in 2009.

On 19 February 2016, the merger of Dolphins F.C. and Sharks F.C. was announced by the Rivers State Commissioner of Sports Boma Iyaye, with the new team named Rivers United F.C.

== Achievements ==
- Nigerian Premier League: 3

1997, 2004, 2011

- Nigerian FA Cup: 4

2001, 2004, 2006, 2007

- Professional Second Division: 3

1994, 2002, 2008–09

- CAF Confederation Cup: 0

Finalist : 2005

== Performance in CAF competitions ==
- CAF Champions League: 3 appearances

1998 – Group stage
2005 – Second Round
2012 – First Round

- CAF Confederation Cup: 3 appearances

2005 – Finalist
2007 – Group stage
2008 – Second Round

- CAF Cup Winners' Cup: 1 appearance

2002 – First Round

== Technical staff ==
Technical Manager

- Musa Abdulahi

Team Manager

- Diepreye Fiberesima

Club Secretary

- Fatai Olayinka

Accountant

- Fubara Ekine

Welfare Office

Wilson Igwe

Media Officer

- China Acheru

Curator

- Amanaman Udoh

Masseur

- Stamford Tiene

== Former coaches ==
- Philip Boamah
- Ifeanyi J. Duruji
