= 2025–26 in Nigerian football =

Football in Nigeria
- Season: 2025–26

Men's football
- Premier Football League: Enugu Rangers
- National League: Sporting Lagos
- FA Cup: El-Kanemi Warriors

Women's football
- Premiership: Edo Queens
- Championship (promoted): Pelican Stars; Imo Strikers Ladies
- Nationwide: C2E Sports Academy
- Women's FA Cup: Nasarawa Amazons

The following article is a summary of the 2025–26 football season in Nigeria. It covers competitive competitions involving Nigerian teams from September 2025 to August 2026.

== Men's national teams ==
=== Nigeria national football team ===
==== Results and fixtures ====
===== Friendlies =====
16 December 2025	Egypt	2–1	Nigeria	Cairo, Egypt
20:00 UTC+2	Saber 28'; M. Mohamed 53'	Report	Awaziem 45+3'	Stadium: Cairo International Stadium; Referee: Mahmoud Nagy (Egypt)

27 March 2026 2026 Jordan International Tournament	Iran	1–2	Nigeria	Antalya, Turkey (Note: The four nation tournament between Jordan, Iran, Nigeria, and Costa Rica were moved from Amman, Jordan to Antalya, Turkey due to the travel restrictions from the 2026 Iran war.)
16:00 UTC+3	Taremi 67'	Report	Simon 7'; Adams 51'	Stadium: Corendon Airlines Park; Attendance: 0 Referee: Cihan Aydın (Turkey)

31 March 2026 2026 Jordan International Tournament	Jordan	2–2	Nigeria	Antalya, Turkey
20:30 UTC+3	Al-Taamari 17'; Al-Dawoud 77'	Report	Simon 25'; Fernandez 41'	Stadium: Mardan Sports Complex; Attendance: 0 Referee: Atilla Karaoğlan (Turkey)

26 May 2026 2026 Unity Cup SF	Nigeria	2–0	Zimbabwe	London, England
19:30 UTC+1	Azeez 5', 62'	Report		Stadium: The Valley; Referee: John Brooks (England)

30 May 2026 2026 Unity Cup F	Nigeria	3–0	Jamaica	London, England
19:30 UTC+1	Yusuf 3', 90'; Moffi 59'	Report		Stadium: The Valley; Referee: Sam Barrott (England)

3 June 2026	Poland	2–2	Nigeria	Warsaw, Poland
20:45 UTC+2	Potulski 45+1'; Wiśniewski 90+5'	Report	Moffi 23'; Onuachu 77' (pen.)	Stadium: Stadion Narodowy; Attendance: 54,408; Referee: Marian Barbu (Romania)

10 June 2026	Portugal	2–1	Nigeria	Leiria, Portugal
20:45 UTC+1	Neto 23'; Conceição 75'	Report	Adams 37'	Stadium: Estádio Dr. Magalhães Pessoa; Attendance: 21,049; Referee: Mateo Busquets Ferrer (Spain)

==== 2026 FIFA World qualification ====
===== Group C =====
Pos	Team	Pld	W	D	L	GF	GA	GD	Pts	Qualification	(South Africa)	(Nigeria)	(Benin)	(Lesotho)	(Rwanda)	(Zimbabwe)
1	South Africa	10	5	3	2	15	9	+6	18	2026 FIFA World Cup	—	1–1	2–1	0–3 (Note: The South Africa v Lesotho match, which originally finished as a 2–0 win for South Africa, was later awarded as a 3–0 win to Lesotho as South Africa fielded an ineligible player, Teboho Mokoena.)	3–0	3–1
2	Nigeria	10	4	5	1	15	8	+7	17	Second round	1–1	—	4–0	1–1	1–0	1–1
3	Benin	10	5	2	3	12	11	+1	17		0–2	2–1	—	4–0	1–0	1–0
4	Lesotho	10	3	3	4	9	12	−3	12		0–3	1–2	0–0	—	0–1	1–0
5	Rwanda	10	3	2	5	5	9	−4	11		2–0	0–2	0–1	1–1	—	0–0
6	Zimbabwe	10	0	5	5	5	12	−7	5		0–0	1–1	2–2	0–2	0–1	—

Source: FIFA
Notes:

6 September 2025	Nigeria	1–0	Rwanda	Uyo, Nigeria
17:00 UTC+1	Arokodare 51'	Report		Stadium: Godswill Akpabio International Stadium; Referee: Alhadi Allaou Mahamat (Chad)

9 September 2025	South Africa	1–1	Nigeria	Blomfontein, South Africa
18:00 UTC+2	Troost-Ekong 25' (o.g.)	Report	Bassey 44'	Stadium: Free State Stadium; Referee: Pierre Atcho (Gabon)

10 October 2025	Lesotho	1–2	Nigeria	Polokwane, South Africa
18:00 UTC+2	Kalake 83'	Report	Troost-Ekong 55' (pen.); Adams 80'	Stadium: Peter Mokaba Stadium; Referee: Alhadi Allaou Mahamat (Chad)

14 October 2025	Nigeria	4–0	Benin	Uyo, Nigeria
17:00 UTC+1	Osimhen 3', 37', 51'; Onyeka 90+1'			Stadium: Godswill Akpabio International Stadium; Referee: Amin Omar (Egypt)

===== Second round =====
Team 1	Score	Team 2
Semi-finals
Nigeria	4–1 (a.e.t.)	Gabon
Cameroon	0–1	DR Congo
Final
Nigeria	1–1 (a.e.t.) (3–4 p)	DR Congo

13 November 2025 SF	Nigeria	4–1 (a.e.t.)	Gabon	Rabat, Morocco
17:00 UTC+1	Adams 78'; Ejuke 97'; Osimhen 102', 110'	Report	M. Lemina 89'	Stadium: Moulay El Hassan Stadium; Referee: Abongile Tom (South Africa)

16 November 2025 F	Nigeria	1–1 (a.e.t.) (3–4 p)	DR Congo	Rabat, Morocco
20:00 UTC+1	Onyeka 3'	Report	Elia 32'	Stadium: Moulay Hassan Stadium; Referee: Jalal Jayed (Morocco)
	Penalties
	Bassey (penalty missed); Simon (penalty missed); Adams (penalty scored); Onyemaechi (penalty scored); Ejuke (penalty scored); Ajayi (penalty missed)		(penalty missed) Moutoussamy; (penalty scored) Sadiki; (penalty missed) Tuanzebe; (penalty scored) Mayele; (penalty scored) Balikwisha; (penalty scored) Mbemba

Nigeria failed to qualify for the 2026 FIFA World Cup.

==== 2025 Africa Cup of Nations ====
===== Group C =====
Pos	Team	Pld	W	D	L	GF	GA	GD	Pts	Qualification
1	Nigeria	3	3	0	0	8	4	+4	9	Advance to knockout stage
2	Tunisia	3	1	1	1	6	5	+1	4	Advance to knockout stage
3	Tanzania	3	0	2	1	3	4	−1	2	Advance to knockout stage
4	Uganda	3	0	1	2	3	7	−4	1	

Source: CAF

23 December 2025	Nigeria	2–1	Tanzania	Fez, Morocco
18:30 UTC+1	Ajayi 36'; Lookman 52'	Report	M'Mombwa 50'	Stadium: Fez Stadium; Attendance: 11,444; Referee: Dahane Beida (Mauritania)

27 December 2025	Nigeria	3–2	Tunisia	Fez, Morocco
21:00 UTC+1	Osimhen 44'; Ndidi 50'; Lookman 67'	Report	Talbi 74'; Abdi 87' (pen.)	Stadium: Fez Stadium; Attendance: 25,544; Referee: Boubou Traore (Mali)

30 December 2025	Uganda	1–3	Nigeria	Fez, Morocco
18:00 UTC+1	Mato 75'	Report	Onuachu 28'; Onyedika 62', 67'	Stadium: Fez Stadium; Attendance: 11,545; Referee: Djindo Houngnandande (Benin)

===== 2025 Africa Cup of Nations knockout stage =====
5 January 2026 R16	Nigeria	4–0	Mozambique	Fez, Morocco
20:00 UTC+1	Lookman 20'; Osimhen 25', 47'; Adams 75'	Report		Stadium: Fez Stadium; Attendance: 14,593; Referee: Abdou Abdel Mefire (Cameroon)

10 January 2026 QF	Algeria	0–2	Nigeria	Marrakesh, Morocco
17:00 UTC+1		Report	Osimhen 47'; Adams 57'	Stadium: Marrakesh Stadium; Attendance: 32,452; Referee: Issa Sy (Senegal)

14 January 2026 SF	Nigeria	0–0 (a.e.t.) (2–4 p)	Morocco	Rabat, Morocco
21:00 UTC+1		Report		Stadium: Prince Moulay Abdellah Stadium; Attendance: 65,458; Referee: Daniel Nii Laryea (Ghana)
	Penalties
	Onuachu (penalty scored); Chukwueze (penalty missed); Dele-Bashiru (penalty scored); Onyemaechi (penalty missed)		(penalty scored) El Aynaoui; (penalty missed) Igamane; (penalty scored) Ben Seghir; (penalty scored) Hakimi; (penalty scored) En-Nesyri

17 January 2026 3rd	Egypt	0–0 (2–4 p)	Nigeria	Casablanca, Morocco
17:00 UTC+1		Report		Stadium: Mohammed V Stadium; Attendance: 38,113; Referee: Jalal Jayed (Morocco)
	Penalties
	Salah (penalty missed); Marmoush (penalty missed); Rabia (penalty scored); Saber (penalty scored)		(penalty missed) Dele-Bashiru; (penalty scored) Adams; (penalty scored) Simon; (penalty scored) Iwobi; (penalty scored) Lookman

=== Nigeria national under-20 football team ===
==== Results and fixtures ====
===== Group B =====
Pos	Team	Pld	W	D	L	GF	GA	GD	Pts	Qualification
1	Burkina Faso	3	2	1	0	6	2	+4	7	Semi-finals
2	Nigeria	3	2	0	1	7	4	+3	6	Semi-finals
3	Ghana	3	0	2	1	3	5	−2	2	
4	Togo	3	0	1	2	1	6	−5	1	

Source: CAF

27 July 2026	Nigeria	4–2	Ghana	Charles Konan Banny Stadium, Yamoussoukro
13:00	Olayemi 4'; Oraro 32'; Adeleke 41' (pen.), 90+2' (pen.)	Report	Zaidan 23'; Nkrumah 62' (pen.)

30 July 2026	Nigeria	3–0	Togo	Lycée Scientifique, Yamoussoukro
13:00	Adeleke 47', 60'; Agbe Joye 86'	Report

2 August 2026	Nigeria	0–2	Burkina Faso	Charles Konan Banny Stadium, Yamoussoukro
13:00		Report	Bagayogo 23'; Zongo 37'

===== Knockout stage =====
5 August 2026 SF	Ivory Coast	2–2 (a.e.t.) (3–4 p)	Nigeria	Charles Konan Banny Stadium, Yamoussoukro
13:00	Keita 18', 105'	Report	Simeon 68'; Aliyu 91'

9 August 2026 F	Nigeria	1–4	Burkina Faso	Charles Konan Banny Stadium, Yamoussoukro
13:00	Adeleke 50' (pen.)	Report	Bagayogo 3'; Tapsoba 5'; Dabo 14'; Barro 90+4'

Nigeria failed to qualify for the 2027 U-20 Africa Cup of Nations and subsequently the 2027 FIFA U-20 World Cup.

=== Nigeria national under-17 football team ===
==== Results and fixtures ====
===== Group B =====
Pos	Team	Pld	W	D	L	GF	GA	GD	Pts	Qualification
1	Nigeria	2	1	1	0	4	1	+3	4	Semi-finals
2	Burkina Faso	2	1	1	0	1	0	+1	4	Semi-finals
3	Benin	2	0	0	2	1	5	−4	0	

Source: WAFU

24 September 2025	Benin	1–4	Nigeria	Stade Lycée Scientifique, Yamoussoukro
15:00	Zannou 45'		Agha 4' (pen.), 14', 31'; Edeh 6'

27 September 2025	Nigeria	0–0	Burkina Faso	Stade Lycée Scientifique, Yamoussoukro
15:00

===== Knockout stage =====
30 September 2025 SF	Nigeria	0–2	Ghana	Charles Konan Banny Stadium, Yamoussoukro
19:00		Report (GFA)	Awuli 21'; Gavi 31'	Referee: Kossi Fabrice Senyo (Togo)

3 October 2025 3rd	Burkina Faso	0–2	Nigeria	Stade Lycée Scientifique, Yamoussoukro
15:00			Yusuf 50'; Umole 77'	Referee: Hugues Modeste Kokora (Ivory Coast)

Nigeria failed to qualify for the 2026 U-17 Africa Cup of Nations and subsequently the 2026 FIFA U-17 World Cup.

== Women's national teams ==
=== Nigeria women's national football team ===
==== Results and fixtures ====
===== Friendlies =====
28 February	Cameroon	1–0	Nigeria	Yaoundé, Cameroon
16:00 UTC+1	Mbomozomo 90'			Stadium: Military Stadium

3 March	Cameroon	1–3	Nigeria	Yaoundé, Cameroon
16:00 UTC+1	Meva 7'		Ihezuo 26'; Babajide 43'; Alozie 64'	Stadium: Military Stadium

5 June	Nigeria	2–1	Senegal	Ikenne, Nigeria
15:00 UTC+0	Oshoala 32' (pen.); Payne 41'	Report	Pène 86'	Stadium: Remo Stars Stadium; Referee: Juliet Appiah (Ghana)

8 June	Nigeria	3–0	Senegal	Ikenne, Nigeria
15:00 UTC+0	Omewa 49', 53'; Oshoala 66'	Report		Stadium: Remo Stars Stadium

22 July	Nigeria	2–1	Tanzania	Casablanca, Morocco
18:00 (UTC+01:00)	Ajibade 15'; Okoronkwo 89'	Report	Clement 79'	Stadium: Lenoria Sports Complex

==== 2026 Women's Africa Cup of Nations qualification ====
24 October 2025 1st leg	Benin	0–2	Nigeria	Lomé (Togo)
15:00 UTC+1		Report (FIFA)	Ihezuo 25'; Okoronkwo 45+2'	Stadium: Stade de Kégué; Referee: Fatou Ngum (Gambia)

28 October 2025 2nd leg	Nigeria	1–1	Benin	Abeokuta
16:00 UTC+1	Plumptre 12'	Report (FIFA)	Djibril 61'	Stadium: MKO Abiola Stadium; Referee: Dominique Hanjavola (Madagascar)
Note: Nigeria won 3–1 on aggregate.

==== 2025 Women's Africa Cup of Nations ====
===== Group C =====
Pos	Team	Pld	W	D	L	GF	GA	GD	Pts	Qualification
1	Malawi	3	2	0	1	7	5	+2	6 (Note: Tied on points. Goals scored in head-to-head matches were used as the tiebreaker; Malawi 4, Nigeria 3 and Zambia 2.)	Advance to knockout stage
2	Nigeria	3	2	0	1	9	5	+4	6	Advance to knockout stage
3	Zambia	3	2	0	1	8	2	+6	6	
4	Egypt	3	0	0	3	3	15	−12	0	

Source: CAF
Notes:

28 July	Nigeria	2–3	Malawi	Rabat, Morocco
21:00 (UTC+01:00)	Ajibade 90+2'; Kanu 90+9'		Chaŵinga 73', 90+5'; Chaŵinga 79'	Stadium: Al Medina Stadium; Referee: Aline Umutoni (Rwanda)

1 August	Nigeria	1–0	Zambia	Rabat, Morocco
21:00 (UTC+01:00)	Oshoala 8'			Stadium: Al Medina Stadium; Referee: josephine wanjiku (Football Kenya Federation)

5 August	Egypt	2–6	Nigeria	Rabat, Morocco
21:00 (UTC+01:00)	Ghazi 45+9' (pen.), 84'		Oshoala 21' (pen.); Monday 45+1'; Kanu 57'; Ucheibe 81' (pen.); Ajibade 90+1' (pen.); Omewa 90+9'	Stadium: Rabat Olympic Stadium; Referee: Aline Umutoni (Rwanda)

===== 2026 Women's Africa Cup of Nations knockout stage =====
9 August 2026 QF	Cameroon	1–0	Nigeria	Casablanca, Morocco
18:00 (UTC+01:00)	Nyadjou 19'			Stadium: Larbi Zaouli Stadium; Referee: Antsino Twanyanyukwa (Namibia)

13 August 2026 Play-in	South Africa	2–1	Nigeria	Casablanca, Morocco
21:00 (UTC+01:00)	Kgatlana 56'; Jane 77'		Ucheibe 90+3' (pen.)	Stadium: Moulay Rachid Stadium; Referee: Aline Guimbang Etong (Cameroon)

Nigeria failed to qualify for the 2027 FIFA Women's World Cup.

=== Nigeria women's national under-20 football team ===
==== 2025 WAFU Zone B U-20 Women's Cup ====
===== Final standings =====
Pos	Team	Pld	W	D	L	GF	GA	GD	Pts	Qualification
1	Nigeria (C)	4	4	0	0	10	1	+9	12	Champions
2	Ghana	4	2	0	2	4	5	−1	6	
3	Benin (H)	4	0	0	4	0	8	−8	0	

Source: WAFU B
(C) Champions; (H) Hosts

8 November 2025	Ghana	0–3	Nigeria	Stade d'Adjohoun, Adjohoun
10:00			Akekoromowei 17'; Olabiyi 24'; Kareem 61'

9 November 2025	Benin	0–1	Nigeria	Stade Municipal de Avrankou, Avrankou
10:00			Kareem 16'

11 November 2025	Nigeria	2–0	Ghana	Stade Municipal de Avrankou, Avrankou
10:00	Kareem 22'; Akekoromowei 78'

12 November 2025	Benin	0–4	Nigeria	Stade d'Adjohoun, Adjohoun
10:00			Kareem 16', 45'; Olabiyi 67'; Akekoromowei 88'

==== 2026 FIFA U-20 Women's World Cup qualification ====
===== Second round =====
21 September 2025 First leg	Rwanda	0–1	Nigeria	Kigali
15:00 UTC+2		Report; Report (NFF)	Olabiyi 70'	Stadium: Kigali Pelé Stadium; Referee: Aminata Fullah (Sierra Leone)

27 September 2025 Second leg	Nigeria	4–0	Rwanda	Ibadan
16:00 UTC+1	Oscar 13'; Adeshina 20'; Akekoromwei 60'; Afolabi 90+1'	Report		Stadium: Lekan Salami Stadium; Referee: Fatou Ngum (Gambia)
Note: Nigeria won 5–0 on aggregate.

===== Third round =====
7 February 2026 First leg	Nigeria	1–0	Senegal	Abeokuta
16:00 UTC+1	Ifeanyi 50'	Report		Stadium: MKO Abiola Stadium; Referee: Diana Murungi (Uganda)

14 February 2026 Second leg	Senegal	1–2	Nigeria	Thiès
17:00 UTC+0	Pène 76'	Report	Ifeanyi 19'; Oscar 68'	Stadium: Stade Lat-Dior; Referee: Zakia El Grini (Morocco)
Note: Nigeria won 3–1 on aggregate.

===== Fourth round =====
2 May 2026 First leg	Nigeria	2–0	Malawi	Ikenne
16:00 UTC+1	Kenneth 46' (o.g.); Ifeanyi 57'	Report (NFF); Report (FAM)		Stadium: Remo Stars Stadium; Referee: Shahenda El Maghrabi (Egypt)

9 May 2026 Second leg	Malawi	2–1	Nigeria	Lilongwe
15:00 UTC+2	Chinzimu 9', 55'	Report	Oscar 61'	Stadium: Bingu National Stadium; Referee: Josephine Wanjiku (Kenya)
Note: Nigeria won 3–2 on aggregate and qualified for the 2026 FIFA U-20 Women's World Cup.

=== Nigeria women's national under-17 football team ===
==== 2026 FIFA U-17 Women's World Cup qualification ====
===== Second round =====
23 May 2026 1st leg	Guinea	0–5	Nigeria	Abidjan (Ivory Coast)
16:00		Report	Chidi 1', 12', 39'; Adegbuyi 37'; Dunstan 56'	Stadium: Felix Houphouet Boigny Stadium; Referee: Dorsaf Ganouati (Tunisia)

31 May 2026 2nd leg	Nigeria	6–0	Guinea	Ikenne
15:00 (16:00 UTC+1)	Adegbuyi 9', 32'; Chidi 21', 34'; Joseph 23'; Oscar 70'	Report		Stadium: Remo Stars Stadium; Referee: Sylvina Garnett (Liberia)
Note: Nigeria won 11–0 on aggregate.

===== Third round =====
4 July 2026 1st leg	Nigeria	3–2	Benin	Ikenne
15:00 (16:00 UTC+1)	Joseph 25'; Adegbuyi 62'; Ifeanyi 75'	Report	Gandonou 14'; Dangui 73'	Stadium: Remo Stars Stadium; Referee: Josphine Wanjiku (Kenya)

11 July 2026 2nd leg	Benin	3–5	Nigeria	Lomé (Togo)
16:00	Gandonou 9', 64'; Lokossou 56'	Report	Dunstan 6'; Stephen 14'; Joseph 20', 54' (pen.), 75'	Stadium: Stade de Kégué; Referee: Shamirah Nabadda (Uganda)
Note: Nigeria won 8–5 on aggregate and qualified for the 2026 FIFA U-17 Women's World Cup.

== CAF club competitions ==
=== CAF Champions League ===
Nigerian clubs participating in the 2025–26 CAF Champions League:

- Remo Stars (entered the first preliminary round)
- Rivers United (entered the first preliminary round)

==== First round ====
Team 1	Agg.	Team 2	1st leg	2nd leg
Remo Stars (Nigeria)	5–0	(Comoros) US Zilimadjou	4–0	1–0
Aigles du Congo (Democratic Republic of the Congo)	0–1	(Nigeria) Rivers United	0–0	0–1

===== Remo Stars =====
21 September 2025 1st leg	Remo Stars (Nigeria)	4–0	(Comoros) US Zilimadjou	MKO Abiola Stadium, Abeokuta
16:00 UTC+1	Ngenge 12'; Anthony 45'; Goita 68'; Olasupo 79'	Report

26 September 2025 2nd leg	US Zilimadjou (Comoros)	0–1	(Nigeria) Remo Stars	MKO Abiola Stadium, Abeokuta (Nigeria)
16:00 UTC+1		Report	Oyowah 74'
Note: Remo Stars won 5–0 on aggregate.

===== Rivers United =====
20 September 2025 1st leg	Aigles du Congo (Democratic Republic of the Congo)	0–0	(Nigeria) Rivers United	Stade des Martyrs, Kinshasa
15:30 UTC+1		Report

28 September 2025 2nd leg	Rivers United (Nigeria)	1–0	(Democratic Republic of the Congo) Aigles du Congo	Godswill Akpabio International Stadium, Uyo
16:00 UTC+1	Manyo 45+6'	Report
Note: Rivers United won 1–0 on aggregate.

==== Second round ====
Team 1	Agg.	Team 2	1st leg	2nd leg
Remo Stars (Nigeria)	1–7	(South Africa) Mamelodi Sundowns	1–5	0–2
Black Bulls (Mozambique)	2–3	(Nigeria) Rivers United	1–0	1–3

===== Remo Stars =====
19 October 2025 1st leg	Remo Stars (Nigeria)	1–5	(South Africa) Mamelodi Sundowns	MKO Abiola Stadium, Abeokuta
16:00 UTC+1	Olasupo 77'	Report	Matthews 12'; Shalulile 42'; Reisinho 61'; Sales 75'; Ntsabeleng 85'	Referee: Abdou Abdel Mefire (Cameroon)

26 October 2025 2nd leg	Mamelodi Sundowns (South Africa)	2–0	(Nigeria) Remo Stars	Loftus Versfeld Stadium, Pretoria
15:30 UTC+2	Santos 21'; Shalulile 45'	Report		Referee: Dick Okello (Uganda)
Note: Mamelodi Sundowns won 7–1 on aggregate.

===== Rivers United =====
18 October 2025 1st leg	Black Bulls (Mozambique)	1–0	(Nigeria) Rivers United	Campo da ABB, Maputo
15:00 UTC+2	Diallo 50'	Report		Referee: Mweshitsama Naftal (Namibia)

25 October 2025 2nd leg	Rivers United (Nigeria)	3–1	(Mozambique) Black Bulls	Godswill Akpabio International Stadium, Uyo
16:00 UTC+1	Falolu 15'; Maclyn 42' (pen.); Zechariah 76'	Report	Diallo 47'	Referee: Kouassi Biro (Ivory Coast)
Note: Rivers United won 3–2 on aggregate.

==== Group stage ====
===== Group A =====
Pos	Team	Pld	W	D	L	GF	GA	GD	Pts	Qualification	PYR	RSB	PDFC	RUFC
1	(Egypt) Pyramids	6	5	1	0	14	2	+12	16	Advance to knockout stage	—	3–0	3–1	3–0
2	(Morocco) RS Berkane	6	3	1	2	8	6	+2	10	Advance to knockout stage	0–0	—	3–0	3–0
3	(Zambia) Power Dynamos	6	2	1	3	4	7	−3	7		0–1	2–0	—	0–0
4	(Nigeria) Rivers United	6	0	1	5	2	13	−11	1		1–4	1–2	0–1	—

Source: CAF

22 November 2025	Pyramids (Egypt)	3–0	(Nigeria) Rivers United	30 June Stadium, Cairo
21:00 UTC+2	Atef 52', 57', 72'	Report		Referee: Mahmood Ismail (Sudan)

28 November 2025	Rivers United (Nigeria)	1–2	(Morocco) RS Berkane	Godswill Akpabio International Stadium, Uyo
17:00 UTC+1	Camara 37' (o.g.)	Report	El Kaabi 90+7'; Chouiar 90+8'	Referee: Issa Sy (Senegal)

24 January 2026	Power Dynamos (Zambia)	0–0	(Nigeria) Rivers United	Levy Mwanawasa Stadium, Ndola
15:00 UTC+2		Report		Referee: Lucky Kasalirwe (Uganda)

1 February 2026	Rivers United (Nigeria)	0–1	(Zambia) Power Dynamos	Godswill Akpabio International Stadium, Uyo
17:00 UTC+1		Report	Chiboni 50'	Referee: Leonidas Barbosa (Cape Verde)

8 February 2026	Rivers United (Nigeria)	1–4	(Egypt) Pyramids	Godswill Akpabio International Stadium, Uyo
17:00 UTC+1	Manyo 33'	Report	Fathi 52'; Ma. Hamdy 77' (pen.); Al-Fakhouri 88'; Maher 90+1'	Referee: Mehrez Melki (Tunisia)

14 February 2026	RS Berkane (Morocco)	3–0	(Nigeria) Rivers United	Berkane Municipal Stadium, Berkane
20:00 UTC+1	Mehri 38'; Bassène 43', 53'	Report		Referee: Mutaz Ibrahim (Libya)

=== CAF Confederation Cup ===
Nigerian clubs participating in the 2025–26 CAF Confederation Cup:

- Kwara United (cup winners; entered the first preliminary round)
- Abia Warriors (third place in league; entered the first preliminary round)

==== First round ====
Team 1	Agg.	Team 2	1st leg	2nd leg
Asante Kotoko (Ghana)	5–3	(Nigeria) Kwara United	4–3	1–0
Abia Warriors (Nigeria)	1–2	(Mali) Djoliba	1–1	0–1

===== Kwara United =====
21 September 2025 1st leg	Asante Kotoko (Ghana)	4–3	(Nigeria) Kwara United	Accra Sports Stadium, Accra
15:00 UTC+0	Antwi 18'; A. Amoah 45', 73' (pen.); Ablorh 47'	Report	Aule 34', 45+2'; Shola 85'

26 September 2025 2nd leg	Kwara United (Nigeria)	0–1	(Ghana) Asante Kotoko	MKO Abiola Stadium, Abeokuta
16:00 UTC+1		Report	Gyau 54'
Note: Asante Kotoko won 5–3 on aggregate.

===== Abia Warriors =====
21 September 2025 1st leg	Abia Warriors (Nigeria)	1–1	(Mali) Djoliba	Godswill Akpabio International Stadium, Uyo
16:00 UTC+1	Obioma 22'	Report	88'

28 September 2025 2nd leg	Djoliba (Mali)	1–0	(Nigeria) Abia Warriors	Stade Mamadou Konaté, Bamako
16:00 UTC+0	30'	Report
Note: Djoliba won 2–1 on aggregate.

=== CAF Women's Champions League ===
Nigerian clubs participating in the 2025–26 CAF Women's Champions League:

- Bayelsa Queens (entered WAFU Zone B qualifiers)

==== Qualifying rounds ====
===== Group B =====
Pos	Team	Pld	W	D	L	GF	GA	GD	Pts	Qualification
1	(Nigeria) Bayelsa Queens	3	3	0	0	9	2	+7	9	Semi-finals
2	(Ghana) Police Ladies	3	2	0	1	7	4	+3	6	Semi-finals
3	(Benin) Sam Nelly	3	1	0	2	3	7	−4	3	
4	(Togo) ASKO Kara	3	0	0	3	1	7	−6	0	

Source: WAFU B

24 August 2025	Bayelsa Queens (Nigeria)	2–1	(Ghana) Police Ladies	Charles Konan Banny Stadium, Yamoussoukro
15:00	Moshood 12'; Essien 62'	Report	Berko 67'

27 August 2025	ASKO Kara (Togo)	0–3	(Nigeria) Bayelsa Queens	Charles Konan Banny Stadium, Yamoussoukro
15:00		Report	Bani 46' (o.g.); Olabiyi 55'; Moshood 88'	Referee: Béatrice Gouchoedou (Benin)

30 August 2025	Sam Nelly (Benin)	1–4	(Nigeria) Bayelsa Queens	Charles Konan Banny Stadium, Yamoussoukro
15:00	Favour 44'	Report	Akekoromowei 14', 59'; Moshood 35'; Olabiyi 55'

====== Knockout stage ======
2 September 2025 SF	Bayelsa Queens (Nigeria)	2–1	(Burkina Faso) USFA	Charles Konan Banny Stadium, Yamoussoukro
19:00	Essien 15'; Akekoromowei 63'	Report	Yeboah 2'	Referee: Kindedji Edoh (Togo)

5 September 2025 F	ASEC Mimosas (Ivory Coast)	1–1 (a.e.t.) (8–7 p)	(Nigeria) Bayelsa Queens	Charles Konan Banny Stadium, Yamoussoukro
19:00	Diallo 5'	Report	Essien 18'	Referee: (Niger) Zouwaira Souley Sani
Note: Bayelsa Queens failed to qualify for the 2025 CAF Women's Champions League

== League competitions (Men's) ==
=== Premier Football League (NPFL) ===
Pos	Team	Pld	W	D	L	GF	GA	GD	Pts	
1	Enugu Rangers (C)	38	19	11	8	47	27	+20	68	Qualification for the Champions League
2	Rivers United	38	19	10	9	44	31	+13	67	Qualification for the Champions League
3	Shooting Stars	38	18	6	14	41	40	+1	60	Qualification for the Confederation Cup
4	Ikorodu City	38	16	10	12	43	39	+4	58	
5	Bendel Insurance	38	14	14	10	44	38	+6	56	
6	Nasarawa United	38	16	8	14	37	34	+3	56	
7	Abia Warriors	38	16	7	15	31	34	−3	55	
8	Barau	38	13	13	12	34	30	+4	52	
9	Katsina United	38	14	10	14	36	39	−3	52	
10	Plateau United	38	15	5	18	39	40	−1	50	
11	Enyimba	38	13	10	15	44	42	+2	49	
12	Kun Khalifat	38	13	10	15	42	40	+2	49	
13	Warri Wolves	38	13	10	15	36	41	−5	49	
14	Niger Tornadoes	38	13	9	16	37	36	+1	48	
15	Kano Pillars (Note: Kano Pillars were deducted 3 points and 3 goals due to match violence.)	38	15	6	17	34	39	−5	48	
16	Kwara United (Note: Kwara United were deducted 3 points and 3 goals due to match violence.)	38	13	11	14	32	36	−4	47	
17	Remo Stars	38	14	5	19	42	47	−5	47	Relegation to the National League
18	El-Kanemi Warriors	38	13	8	17	27	46	−19	47	Qualification for the CAF Confederation Cup and Relegation to the National League (Note: El-Kanemi Warriors qualified for the CAF Confederation Cup as the 2026 Nigeria Federation Cup winners)
19	Bayelsa United	38	11	10	17	37	42	−5	43	Relegation to the National League
20	Wikki Tourists	38	9	13	16	36	48	−12	40	Relegation to the National League

Source: NPFL
Rules for classification: 1) points; 2) goal difference; 3) number of goals scored
(C) Champions

=== National League (NNL) ===
==== Main round ====
===== Conference A =====
Pos	Team	Pld	W	D	L	GF	GA	GD	Pts	Qualification or relegation
1	Inter Lagos	16	8	5	3	26	13	+13	29	Promotion to NPFL and qualification to Championship Round
2	Beyond Limits (Note: ineligible for promotion.)	16	7	7	2	23	13	+10	28	Ineligible for promotion
3	Heartland	16	8	3	5	21	17	+4	27	
4	Smart City	16	8	3	5	21	19	+2	27	
5	Sunshine Stars	16	7	4	5	18	14	+4	25	
6	Edel FC	16	6	2	8	14	20	−6	20	
7	Crown FC	16	4	4	8	18	19	−1	16	
8	Abia Comets	16	4	3	9	16	31	−15	15	Relegation to NLO
9	Gateway United	16	3	3	10	13	24	−11	12	Relegation to NLO
10	Dakkada (Note: Dakkada withdrew after the draw due to disputes with the League Board over their conference placement after originally drawn into Conference B.)	0	0	0	0	0	0	0	0	Withdrew

Source: Soccerway
Rules for classification: 1) Points; 2) Goal difference; 3) Goals scored.

===== Conference B =====
Pos	Team	Pld	W	D	L	GF	GA	GD	Pts	Qualification or relegation
1	Sporting Lagos	18	11	3	4	31	14	+17	36	Promotion to NPFL and Qualification for the Championship round
2	Akwa United	18	11	2	5	23	13	+10	35	
3	Ekiti United	18	10	0	8	21	17	+4	30	
4	Stormers SC	18	8	2	8	24	26	−2	26	
5	Abakaliki FC	18	7	4	7	19	17	+2	25	
6	Solutions FC	18	8	1	9	18	22	−4	25	
7	Godswill Akpabio FC	18	6	6	6	27	24	+3	24	
8	Rovers	18	7	1	10	15	21	−6	22	Relegation to NLO
9	Osun United	18	6	2	10	16	24	−8	20	Relegation to NLO
10	First Bank FC	18	4	3	11	15	31	−16	15	Relegation to NLO

Source: Soccerway
Rules for classification: 1) Points; 2) Goal difference; 3) Goals scored.

===== Conference C =====
Pos	Team	Pld	W	D	L	GF	GA	GD	Pts	Qualification or relegation
1	Doma United	14	8	2	4	18	11	+7	26	Promotion to NPFL and Qualification for the Championship round
2	Lobi Stars	14	7	2	5	12	10	+2	23	
3	FC Basira	14	6	3	5	17	14	+3	21	
4	Kada Warriors	14	5	5	4	11	9	+2	20	
5	Sokoto United	14	5	3	6	9	11	−2	18	
6	ABS FC	14	5	2	7	10	16	−6	17	
7	Mighty Jets	14	5	1	8	14	16	−2	16	Relegation to NLO
8	City FC	14	4	4	6	10	14	−4	16	Relegation to NLO

Source: Soccerway
Rules for classification: 1) Points; 2) Goal difference; 3) Goals scored.

===== Conference D =====
Pos	Team	Pld	W	D	L	GF	GA	GD	Pts	Qualification or relegation
1	Ranchers Bees	12	6	2	4	11	9	+2	20	Promotion to NPFL and Qualification for the Championship round
2	Adamawa United	12	6	0	6	12	11	+1	18	
3	Jigawa Golden Stars	12	5	3	4	12	15	−3	18	
4	Yobe Desert Stars	12	5	2	5	14	13	+1	17	
5	Kebbi United	12	5	1	6	11	11	0	16	
6	Bichi First	12	4	3	5	11	9	+2	15	
7	Gombe United	12	4	3	5	8	11	−3	15	Relegation to NLO
8	Sporting Supreme (Note: Sporting Supreme were excluded from all Nigerian national competitions by the NNL on 21st December 2025 and their record were expunged.)	0	0	0	0	0	0	0	0	Expelled, results annulled

Source: Soccerway
Rules for classification: 1) Points; 2) Goal difference; 3) Goals scored.

==== Championship round ====
Pos	Team	Pld	W	D	L	GF	GA	GD	Pts	Qualification
1	Sporting Lagos (C)	3	2	0	1	5	1	+4	6	Champions
2	Inter Lagos	3	2	0	1	3	1	+2	6	
3	Ranchers Bees	3	1	0	2	3	4	−1	3	
4	Doma United	3	1	0	2	2	7	−5	3	

(C) Champions

== Cup competitions (Men's) ==
=== Federation Cup ===
==== State Federation Cup finals ====
State	Winner	Score	Runners-up
Abia	Enyimba	4–0	Ahudiyannem
Adamawa	Adamawa United	1–0	Adamawa United Academy
Akwa-Ibom	Akwa United	0–0 (5–4 p)	Godswill Akpabio United
Anambra	Edel	2–0	Amanda FC
Bauchi	Wikki Tourists	0–0 (4–2 p)	Warinje
Bayelsa	Bayelsa United	1–0	Krosaders FA
Benue	Flight FC	1–0	Lobi Stars
Borno	El-Kanemi Warriors	1–0	El-Kanemi Warriors Juniors
Cross River	E-World United FC	2–1	Mojoda FC
Delta	De Sapele Lions	1–1 (4–3 p)	Warri Wolves
Ebonyi	Abakaliki	1–0	Cynosure
Edo	Bendel Insurance	2–0	Westgate FC
Ekiti	Agbanna	1–1 (11–10 p)	Harmony FC
Enugu	Enugu Rangers	2–1	Ingas
Gombe	Gombe United	4–0	El-Shama
Imo	Campos FA	2–0	OISA FC
Jigawa	Jigawa Golden Stars	??	Junior Jigawa Golden Stars
Kaduna	Kada Warriors	1–1 (4–3 p)	ABU DLC
Kano	Barau	3–2	Bichi First
Katsina	Katsina United	1–0	Katsina United Feeders
Kebbi	Kebbi United	2–2 (5–3 p)	Kanta Warriors
Kogi	Kogi United	2–0	Reigners FC
Kwara	Kwara United	2–0	Gaa-Akanbi
Lagos	Ikorodu City	1–0	G12 FC
Nasarawa	Nasarawa United	1–0	Basira FC
Niger	Bida Lions	1–0	Niger Tornadoes
Ogun	Beyond Limits	2–1	Stormers
Ondo	Sunshine Stars U19	1–1 (5–4 p)	Adamimogo
Osun	Dokkal Khairu	1–0	Ejigbo City
Oyo	Crown FC	1–1 (4–2 p)	Shooting Stars
Plateau	Plateau United	1–0	Mighty Jets
Rivers	Rivers United	3–0	Wilbros FC
Sokoto	Sokoto United	–	YSFON Stars
Zamfara	Zamfara United	1–1 (11–10 p)	Zamfara United Feeders
FCT	Sporting Supreme	2–1	Sporting Supreme U19

==== Final ====
Team 1	Score	Team 2
El-Kanemi Warriors	1–0	Ikorodu City

11 July 2026	El-Kanemi Warriors	1–0	Ikorodu City	Stephen Keshi Stadium, Asaba
16:00 (UTC+1)	Muktar Ismail 19' (pen.)	Report

== League competitions (Women's) ==
=== Premiership ===
==== Regular season ====
===== Group A =====
Pos	Team	Pld	W	D	L	GF	GA	GD	Pts	Qualification
1	Bayelsa Queens	16	12	1	3	35	12	+23	37	Championship round
2	Edo Queens	16	11	3	2	27	11	+16	36	Championship round
3	Rivers Angels	16	11	1	4	29	10	+19	34	Championship round
4	Ekiti Queens	16	7	1	8	17	19	−2	22	
5	Heartland Queens	16	6	4	6	16	19	−3	22	
6	Adamawa Queens	16	6	2	8	15	24	−9	20	
7	Ibom Angels	16	5	4	7	14	18	−4	19	
8	Pacesetter Queens	16	1	5	10	7	20	−13	8	Relegation to NWFL Championship
9	Naija Ratels	16	1	3	12	6	33	−27	6	Relegation to NWFL Championship
10	Castmog Ladies	0	0	0	0	0	0	0	0	Withdrawn

Source: TheNWFL

===== Group B =====
Pos	Team	Pld	W	D	L	GF	GA	GD	Pts	Qualification
1	Robo Queens	18	12	2	4	32	13	+19	38	Championship round
2	Nasarawa Amazons	18	9	5	4	22	12	+10	32	Championship round
3	Abia Angels	18	8	4	6	20	13	+7	28	Championship round
4	Ahudiyannem Queens	18	7	4	7	22	17	+5	25	
5	Delta Queens	18	7	4	7	24	24	0	25	
6	Remo Stars Ladies	18	6	6	6	22	15	+7	24	
7	Dannaz Ladies	18	7	2	9	18	31	−13	23	
8	Sunshine Queens	18	5	7	6	13	11	+2	22	Relegation to NWFL Championship
9	Osun Babes	18	5	3	10	9	27	−18	18	Relegation to NWFL Championship
10	Confluence Queens	18	3	5	10	14	33	−19	14	Relegation to NWFL Championship

Source: TheNWFL

==== Championship Play-offs ====
Pos	Team	Pld	W	D	L	GF	GA	GD	Pts	Qualification
1	Edo Queens	5	3	1	1	12	5	+7	10	Champions/CAF WCL
2	Bayelsa Queens	5	2	2	1	6	4	+2	8	
3	Nasarawa Amazons	5	2	2	1	3	3	0	8	
4	Abia Angels	5	1	3	1	5	8	−3	6	
5	Rivers Angels	5	1	1	3	5	7	−2	4	
6	Robo Queens	5	1	1	3	6	10	−4	4	

Source: TheNWFL

=== Championship ===
==== Group stage ====
===== Group A =====
Pos	Team	Pld	W	D	L	GF	GA	GD	Pts	Qualification or relegation
1	DreamStar Ladies	3	2	1	0	5	2	+3	7	Promotion Play-offs
2	Rosaria Victrix	3	2	0	1	6	4	+2	6	
3	Delta Babes	3	1	1	1	2	3	−1	4	
4	First Mahi Babes	3	0	0	3	3	7	−4	0	Relegation play-offs

Source: TheNWFL
Rules for classification: 1) Points; 2) Goal difference; 3) Goals scored.

===== Group B =====
Pos	Team	Pld	W	D	L	GF	GA	GD	Pts	Qualification or relegation
1	Pelican Stars	3	3	0	0	5	1	+4	9	Promotion Play-offs
2	Moje Queens	3	1	1	1	2	2	0	4	
3	Ikukuoma Babes	3	1	0	2	4	4	0	3	
4	Gallant Queens	3	0	1	2	2	6	−4	1	Relegation play-offs

Source: TheNWFL
Rules for classification: 1) Points; 2) Goal difference; 3) Goals scored.

===== Group C =====
Pos	Team	Pld	W	D	L	GF	GA	GD	Pts	Qualification or relegation
1	Enugu Rangers Women	3	2	1	0	3	1	+2	7	Promotion Play-offs
2	Unification Ladies	3	1	2	0	5	1	+4	5	
3	Wazbak International	3	1	0	2	5	9	−4	3	
4	Fortress Ladies	3	0	1	2	2	4	−2	1	Relegation play-offs

Source: TheNWFL
Rules for classification: 1) Points; 2) Goal difference; 3) Goals scored.

===== Group D =====
Pos	Team	Pld	W	D	L	GF	GA	GD	Pts	Qualification or relegation
1	Imo Strikers Queens	3	3	0	0	10	0	+10	9	Promotion Play-offs
2	Ghetto Tigers Ladies	3	2	0	1	3	4	−1	6	
3	Kwara Ladies	3	0	1	2	0	4	−4	1	
4	Chosen Generation	3	0	1	2	0	5	−5	1	Relegation play-offs

Source: TheNWFL
Rules for classification: 1) Points; 2) Goal difference; 3) Goals scored.

==== Play-offs ====
===== Relegation play-offs =====
16 July 2026
09:00 (UTC+1)

First Mahi Babes	0–1	Gallant Queens
		Hope Jeremiah 29'

U.J. Esuene Stadium, Calabar
16 July 2026
11:30 (UTC+1)

Fortress Ladies	4–1	Chosen Generation
Favour Enodunwenben 5', 65', 71'; Omosefe Ugbo 57'		Mary Adekunle 78'

U.J. Esuene Stadium, Calabar

First Mahi Babes and Chosen Generation were relegated.

===== Promotion play-offs =====
16 July 2026
14:00 (UTC+1)

Enugu Rangers Women	0–0	Imo Strikers Queens
Penalties
	4–5

U.J. Esuene Stadium, Calabar
16 July 2026
16:00 (UTC+1)

DreamStar Ladies	0–1	Pelican Stars
	Report	Blessing Ayila 90+10'

U.J. Esuene Stadium, Calabar

Imo Strikers Queens and Pelican Stars gained promotion to the NWFL Premiership.

=== Nationwide League ===
==== Group stage ====
===== Group A =====
Pos	Team	Pld	W	D	L	GF	GA	GD	Pts	Qualification or relegation
1	Kwara United Queens	2	1	1	0	1	0	+1	4	Promotion play-offs
2	Solo Wonders Babes	2	1	0	1	2	2	0	3	
3	Spunky Blazers FA	2	0	1	1	1	2	−1	1	

Source: TheNWFL
Rules for classification: 1) Points; 2) Goal difference; 3) Goals scored.

===== Group B =====
Pos	Team	Pld	W	D	L	GF	GA	GD	Pts	Qualification or relegation
1	C2E Sports Academy	2	2	0	0	15	1	+14	6	Promotion play-offs
2	Lakeside Queens	2	1	0	1	3	5	−2	3	
3	Bayelsa Princesses	2	0	0	2	1	13	−12	0	

Source: TheNWFL
Rules for classification: 1) Points; 2) Goal difference; 3) Goals scored.

===== Group C =====
Pos	Team	Pld	W	D	L	GF	GA	GD	Pts	Qualification or relegation
1	Onimarg FC	2	2	0	0	7	3	+4	6	Promotion play-offs
2	Ubakala Babes	2	1	0	1	8	5	+3	3	
3	NAF Queens	2	0	0	2	2	9	−7	0	

Source: TheNWFL
Rules for classification: 1) Points; 2) Goal difference; 3) Goals scored.

===== Group D =====
Pos	Team	Pld	W	D	L	GF	GA	GD	Pts	Qualification or relegation
1	Obosa FA	2	1	1	0	3	2	+1	4	Promotion play-offs
2	Osklean FA	2	1	1	0	2	1	+1	4	
3	Plateau United Queens	2	0	0	2	3	5	−2	0	

Source: TheNWFL
Rules for classification: 1) Points; 2) Goal difference; 3) Goals scored.

==== Promotion play-offs ====
===== Semi-final =====
21 August 2026
09:00 (UTC+1)

Kwara United Queens	2–4	C2E Sports Academy
Oluwabunkunmi Azeez 3'; Amarachi Nnorom 47'	Report	Omobolanle Abdulganiu 45' (o.g.); Chidinma Gideon 52'; Taiwo Omoniyi 74' (o.g.); Agnes Ohuche 87'

Enyimba International Stadium, Aba
21 August 2026
11:00 (UTC+1)

Onimarg FC	2–4	Obosa FA
Victoria Yakubu 10'; Adeomo Lovelyn 33'	Report	Chinemerem Nnachi 13'; Idowu Saidat 45+2', 55'; Aliu Rofia 90+2'

Enyimba International Stadium, Aba

C2E Sports Academy and Obosa FA gained promotion to the NWFL Championship.

===== Final =====
23 August 2026
14:00 (UTC+1)

C2E Sports Academy	2–1	Obosa FA
Agnes Ohuche 11'; Nina Ude 30'	Report	Saidat Idowu 47'

Enyimba International Stadium, Aba

C2E were the winners of the NWFL Nationwide League.

== Cup competitions (Women's) ==
=== Final ===
Team 1	Score	Team 2
Heartland Queens	1–1 (4–5 p)	Nasarawa Amazons

11 July 2026	Heartland Queens	1–1 (4–5 p)	Nasarawa Amazons	Stephen Keshi Stadium, Asaba
12:00 (UTC+1)	Chizoba 47'	Report	Okah 65'

== Deaths ==
- 9 March 2026: Festus Onigbinde (aged 88), former Nigeria manager.
- 14 March 2026: Henry Nwosu (aged 62), former Nigerian footballer and manager.
- 24 April 2026: Michael Eneramo (aged 40), former Esperance de Tunis, Sivasspor and Nigerian striker.
- 25 May 2026: Victor Udoh (aged 21), former Nigerian and Royal Antwerp forward.
- 11 August 2026: Chinedu Ozoh (aged 27), former Katsina United and Kano Pillars defender.
