= 2026–27 Nigeria Premier Football League =

Nigeria Premier Football League
- Season: 2026–27
- Dates: 28 August 2026 – 30 May 2027
- Matches: 128
- Goals: 299 (2.34 per match)
- Biggest home win: Rivers United 5–0 Kun Khalifat (24 September 2026)
- Biggest away win: Inter Lagos 0–3 Sporting Lagos (13 September 2026)
- Highest scoring: Bendel Insurance 4–2 Kun Khalifat (13 September 2026); Kun Khalifat 2–4 Enugu Rangers (20 September 2026); Enyimba 4–2 Shooting Stars (30 September 2026); Katsina United 4–2 Enyimba (9 October 2026)
- Longest winning run: Doma United & Enugu Rangers (3 matches)
- Longest unbeaten run: Rivers United (9 matches)
- Longest winless run: Inter Lagos (8 matches)
- Longest losing run: Enyimba (4 matches)
- All statistics correct as of 18 November 2026.

The 2026–27 Nigeria Premier Football League (officially known as the Euromatch Premier Football League for sponsorship reasons) is the 56th season of Nigeria's top-flight association football league and the 37th since attaining professionalism. The season commences on 28 August 2026 and will conclude on 30 May 2027, with a two-week mid-season break from December 23 to January 6.

The season sees a reported increase in the league champion prize to ₦1 billion ($741,279) and a deal with Murphy Ben International to stream matches on YouTube.

== Teams ==
=== Changes from previous season ===
Twenty teams, consisting of the top sixteen teams from the previous season and four promoted teams from the Nigeria National League, are competing in the league. The promoted teams are NNL champions Sporting Lagos, along with debutants Inter Lagos. Doma United are also making a return since the 2023–24 season while Ranchers Bees makes a return since the 2009–10 season. The four replace Remo Stars, El-Kanemi Warriors, Bayelsa United and Wikki Tourists who all got relegated the previous season. For the first time since 1996, three teams from Lagos will be participating in a NPFL season.

▲ Promoted from 2025–26 National League	▼ Relegated to 2026–27 National League
Doma United; Inter Lagos; Sporting Lagos; Ranchers Bees	Wikki Tourists; Bayelsa United; El-Kanemi Warriors; Remo Stars

=== Teams information ===
Locations of the 2026–27 Nigeria Premier Football League teams

The below stadiums are those utilized by the clubs for most of the season, it does not note those that were used by the clubs temporarily.

Team	Location	Stadium	Capacity
Abia Warriors	Umuahia	Umuahia Township Stadium	5,000
Barau	Dambatta	Sani Abacha Stadium (Note: Barau play all their home games at Sani Abacha Stadium in Kano as their home stadium Dambatta Stadium, Dambatta is not suitable to host games.)	16,000
Bendel Insurance	Benin City	Samuel Ogbemudia Stadium	12,000
Doma United	Gombe	Pantami Stadium	12,000
Enugu Rangers	Enugu	Nnamdi Azikiwe Stadium	22,000
Enyimba	Aba	Enyimba International Stadium	16,000
Ikorodu City	Ikorodu, Lagos State	Onikan Stadium	10,000
Inter Lagos	Lagos	Onikan Stadium	10,000
Kano Pillars	Kano	Sani Abacha Stadium	16,000
Katsina United	Katsina	Muhammadu Dikko Stadium	35,000
Kun Khalifat	Owerri	Dan Anyiam Stadium	10,000
Kwara United	Ilorin	Kwara State Stadium	18,000
Nasarawa United	Lafia	Lafia Township Stadium	10,000
Niger Tornadoes	Minna	Bako Kontagora Stadium	5,000
Plateau United	Jos	New Jos Stadium	44,000
Ranchers Bees	Kaduna	Muhammadu Dikko Stadium	35,000
Rivers United	Port Harcourt	Adokiye Amiesimaka Stadium	40,000
Shooting Stars	Ibadan	Lekan Salami Stadium	15,000
Sporting Lagos	Lagos	Onikan Stadium	10,000
Warri Wolves	Warri	Ozoro Stadium	10,000

=== Personnel ===
Team	Manager	Captain
Abia Warriors	Imama Amapakabo	Augustine Njoku
Barau	Eugene Agagbe	Usman Maidubji
Bendel Insurance	Kennedy Boboye	Amas Obasogie
Doma United	Deji Ayeni	
Enugu Rangers	Fidelis Ilechukwu	Chidiebere Nwobodo
Enyimba	Emmanuel Deutsch	Paschal Eze
Ikorodu City	Bright Ozebagbe	Godspower Anozie
Inter Lagos	Shakiru Biodun Giwa	Uchenna Njoku
Kano Pillars	Daniel Ogunmodede	Rabiu Ali
Katsina United	Azeez Audu Mohammed	Usman Barau
Kun khalifat	Obinna Uzoho	Joseph Ameh
Kwara United	Ashifat Suleiman	Suraj Ayeleso
Nasarawa United	Mbwas Mangut	Emmanuel Makama
Niger Tornadoes	Kabiru Dogo	Ifeanyi Okoye
Plateau United	Gbenga Ogunbote	Albert Hilary
Ranchers Bees	Usman Abd'Allah	
Rivers United	Finidi George	Stephen Manyo
Shooting Stars	Salisu Yusuf	Ghali Falke
Sporting Lagos	Jeffrey Buter	Solomon Uloko
Warri Wolves	Hassan Abdallahi	

== League table ==
Pos	Team	Pld	W	D	L	GF	GA	GD	Pts	Qualification or relegation
1	Enugu Rangers	11	7	3	1	17	10	+7	24	Qualification for the Champions League
2	Kano Pillars	13	5	7	1	16	12	+4	22	Qualification for the Champions League
3	Bendel Insurance	13	7	0	6	21	19	+2	21	Qualification for the Confederation Cup
4	Rivers United	13	4	8	1	17	7	+10	20	
5	Barau	13	4	8	1	14	10	+4	20	
6	Nasarawa United	13	6	2	5	15	13	+2	20	
7	Katsina United	13	5	5	3	17	17	0	20	
8	Plateau United	13	5	4	4	22	17	+5	19	
9	Ikorodu City	13	4	6	3	18	15	+3	18	
10	Shooting Stars	13	5	3	5	18	17	+1	18	
11	Niger Tornadoes	13	4	5	4	11	11	0	17	
12	Doma United	13	4	5	4	16	17	−1	17	
13	Sporting Lagos	11	4	3	4	15	15	0	15	
14	Ranchers Bees	13	4	3	6	14	16	−2	15	
15	Warri Wolves (Note: Warri Wolves were deducted 3 points and 3 goals by the league body due to assault on match officials.)	13	4	5	4	7	10	−3	14	
16	Kwara United	13	3	4	6	13	15	−2	13	
17	Kun Khalifat	13	3	4	6	10	20	−10	13	Relegation to the National League
18	Enyimba	13	3	2	8	12	17	−5	11	Relegation to the National League
19	Abia Warriors	13	2	5	6	13	21	−8	11	Relegation to the National League
20	Inter Lagos (Note: Inter Lagos were deducted 3 points and 3 goals by the league body due to assault on match officials.)	13	2	4	7	7	20	−13	7	Relegation to the National League

Updated to match(es) played on 18 November 2026. Source: NPFL
Rules for classification: 1) Points; 2) Goal difference; 3) Goals scored; 4) Head-to-head points; 5) Head-to-head goal difference; 6) Head-to-head goal scored; 7) Play-off at neutral site (only if deciding champion, CAF competition qualification, or relegation).

== Results ==
Home \ Away	ABW	BAR	BEN	DOM	ENU	ENY	IKR	INT	KAN	KAT	KWA	NAS	NIG	PLA	RAN	RIV	3SC	SPO	WWV	KUN
Abia Warriors			3–0	2–2			2–2						0–1			0–0				0–0
Barau	2–0				2–2						1–1	3–1			3–1		1–0			
Bendel Insurance		4–1					2–1						2–1			2–1			2–1	4–2
Doma United		0–0				2–0	2–2							2–2				2–0	1–0	1–1
Enugu Rangers	3–1		1–0							1–1	1–0	2–1			1–0					
Enyimba							0–1	0–1						2–0			4–2	2–3	0–0	1–0
Ikorodu City		0–0			2–0			2–2			2–0				3–1		2–2			
Inter Lagos	2–1			0–1					1–1	1–1		0–2			1–1			0–3		
Kano Pillars				4–1		0–0				1–0		2–0	3–2		1–0			1–1		
Katsina United				2–1		4–2						2–1	1–0	2–2		1–1		2–1		
Kwara United	1–1		1–2						2–2	3–0		2–1			2–1	1–1				
Nasarawa United			1–0	2–0		1–0							1–0	3–1		1–1				
Niger Tornadoes		0–0				2–1	2–1							1–1		1–1			0–0	1–0
Plateau United								2–0	4–0		1–0						3–1	2–3	1–1	3–0
Ranchers Bees	4–0		2–1	2–1		1–0							0–0			0–0				
Rivers United		0–0			1–1		2–0							2–0					2–0	5–0
Shooting Stars	4–1		2–1					2–1	0–0	2–0		0–0			3–1					
Sporting Lagos	0–2	1–1	2–1				0–0													
Warri Wolves					0–1			3–1	0–0	1–1	1–0						1–0	2–1		
Kun Khalifat		0–0			2–4			1–0	1–1		1–0						2–0			

Updated to match(es) played on 18 November 2026. Source: NPFL
Legend: Blue = home team win; Yellow = draw; Red = away team win.

== Positions by round ==
To preserve chronological evolvements, any postponed matches are not included to the round at which they were originally scheduled, but added to the full round they were played immediately afterwards. For example, if a match is scheduled for round 7, but then played between rounds 8 and 9, it will be added to the standings for round 8.

Team ╲ Round	1	2	3	4	5	6	7	8	9	10	11	12	13	14	15	16	17	18	19	20
Abia Warriors	12	16	16	10	14	10	15	15	16	17	18	19	19							
Barau	1	2	2	2	1	3	4	4	5	5	7	4	5							
Bendel Insurance	5	9	4	8	5	8	5	7	10	6	4	2	3							
Doma United	3	1	1	1	4	5	3	5	8	10	12	9	12							
Enugu Rangers	10	13	8	5	3	1	1	1	2	2	1	1	1							
Enyimba	14	17	18	20	20	19	16	19	18	19	17	17	18							
Ikorodu City	2	5	5	9	12	7	9	6	9	11	13	11	9							
Inter Lagos	15	19	20	18	17	20	19	20	20	20	20	20	20							
Kano Pillars	8	3	7	3	6	6	6	10	7	8	3	5	2							
Katsina United	11	14	17	14	18	11	11	9	12	12	9	7	7							
Kun Khalifat	13	12	15	19	19	18	20	18	17	16	16	14	17							
Kwara United	9	15	6	11	8	12	8	12	13	13	15	15	16							
Nasarawa United	17	10	14	13	16	14	14	11	6	3	5	3	6							
Niger Tornadoes	6	8	9	12	13	17	12	14	11	9	8	10	11							
Plateau United	19	11	10	6	7	4	7	3	4	4	6	8	8							
Ranchers Bees	18	4	13	7	10	13	17	16	19	18	19	16	14							
Rivers United	4	6	3	4	2	2	2	2	1	1	2	6	4							
Shooting Stars	7	7	12	15	9	16	13	17	15	15	10	13	10							
Sporting Lagos	20	20	11	16	11	9	10	8	3	7	11	12	13							
Warri Wolves	16	18	19	17	15	15	18	13	14	14	14	18	15							

Leader
Qualification for the Champions League
Qualification for the Confederation Cup
Relegation to Nigeria National League

Updated to match(es) played on 17 November 2026. Source: World Football

== Statistics ==
=== Scoring ===
==== Top scorers ====
As of 18 November 2026

Rank	Player	Club	Goals	
1	(Nigeria) Chukwuemeka Obioma	Abia Warriors	8	
2	(Nigeria) Luis Dadong	Katsina United	7	
2	(Nigeria) Muhammad Zulkifilu	Ranchers Bees	5	
2	(Nigeria) Sadiq Rilwan	Doma United	5	
2	(Nigeria) Kayode Oke Solomon	Bendel Insurance	5	
6	(Nigeria) Chinedu Nwosu	Bendel Insurance	4	
6	(Nigeria) Jibrin Ibrahim	Plateau United	4	
6	(Nigeria) Victor Dawa	Plateau United	4	
6	(Nigeria) Joseph Atule	Barau	4	
6	(Nigeria) Sugau Aliyu	Barau	4	
6	(Nigeria) Jofrank Istifanus	Nasarawa United	4	
13	18 players		12 clubs	3

==== Hat-tricks ====
As of 7 September 2026

Player	For	Against	Result	Date
Muhammad Zulkifilu	Ranchers Bees	Abia Warriors	4–0 (H)	7 September 2026

== See also ==
- 2026–27 Nigeria National League
