= 2026 Nigeria Federation Cup =

78th edition of the Nigeria FA Cup

President Federation Cup

Tournament details
- Country: Nigeria
- Dates: 6 May – 11 July 2026
- Teams: 70

Final positions
- Champions: El-Kanemi Warriors (4th title)
- Runners-up: Ikorodu City
- CAF Confederation Cup: El-Kanemi Warriors

Tournament statistics
- Matches played: 60
- Goals scored: 145 (2.42 per match)

The 2026 Nigeria Federation Cup was the 78th edition of the Nigeria Federation Cup, the nation's oldest knockout football tournament. The tournament began with the National playoffs on 6 May. Defending champions Kwara United were eliminated at the round of 32 by Sokoto United.

The format remained the same with 70 clubs qualifying as finalists from 34 state tournaments held across the states of Nigeria and the FCT. Taraba State and Yobe State failed to enter a team.

El-Kanemi Warriors defeated Ikorodu City 1–0 in the final to win their fourth title.

== Format ==
The competition is a single elimination knockout tournament featuring the 70 finalists of each state tournaments plus the FCT. The 12 weakest clubs entered the national play-off round, whereafter the winners joined the remaining 58 teams at the main tournament. All matches are played at neutral stadiums.

Matches are played 90 minutes with tied games going straight to penalties.

The final was held at the Stephen Keshi Stadium in Asaba.

== Schedule ==
The rounds of the 2026 competition were scheduled as follows:

Round	Matches
National play-offs	6 May 2026
Draw	15 May 2026
Round of 64	19–21 May 2026
Round of 32	1 June 2026
Round of 16	6 June 2026
Quarter-finals	11 June 2026
Semi-finals	17 June 2026
Final	11 July 2026

== State tournament finals ==
State	Winner	Score	Runners-up
Abia	Enyimba	4–0	Ahudiyannem
Adamawa	Adamawa United	1–0	Adamawa United Academy
Akwa-Ibom	Akwa United	0–0 (5–4 p)	Godswill Akpabio United
Anambra	Edel	2–0	Amanda FC
Bauchi	Wikki Tourists	0–0 (4–2 p)	Warinje
Bayelsa	Bayelsa United	1–0	Krosaders FA
Benue	Flight FC	1–0	Lobi Stars
Borno	El-Kanemi Warriors	1–0	El-Kanemi Warriors Juniors
Cross River	E-World United FC	2–1	Mojoda FC
Delta	De Sapele Lions	1–1 (4–3 p)	Warri Wolves
Ebonyi	Abakaliki	1–0	Cynosure
Edo	Bendel Insurance	2–0	Westgate FC
Ekiti	Agbanna	1–1 (11–10 p)	Harmony FC
Enugu	Enugu Rangers	2–1	Ingas
Gombe	Gombe United	4–0	El-Shama
Imo	Campos FA	2–0	OISA FC
Jigawa	Jigawa Golden Stars	??	Junior Jigawa Golden Stars
Kaduna	Kada Warriors	1–1 (4–3 p)	ABU DLC
Kano	Barau	3–2	Bichi First
Katsina	Katsina United	1–0	Katsina United Feeders
Kebbi	Kebbi United	2–2 (5–3 p)	Kanta Warriors
Kogi	Kogi United	2–0	Reigners FC
Kwara	Kwara United	2–0	Gaa-Akanbi
Lagos	Ikorodu City	1–0	G12 FC
Nasarawa	Nasarawa United	1–0	Basira FC
Niger	Bida Lions	1–0	Niger Tornadoes
Ogun	Beyond Limits	2–1	Stormers
Ondo	Sunshine Stars U19	1–1 (5–4 p)	Adamimogo
Osun	Dokkal Khairu	1–0	Ejigbo City
Oyo	Crown FC	1–1 (4–2 p)	Shooting Stars
Plateau	Plateau United	1–0	Mighty Jets
Rivers	Rivers United	3–0	Wilbros FC
Sokoto	Sokoto United	–	YSFON Stars
Zamfara	Zamfara United	1–1 (11–10 p)	Zamfara United Feeders
FCT	Sporting Supreme	2–1	Sporting Supreme U19

== National play-offs ==
All matches were played on 6 May.

Team 1	Score	Team 2
Sunshine Stars U19	3–1	Harmony FC
G12 FC	0–0 (3–2 p)	Dokkal Khairu
Westgate FC	2–0	Amanda FC
Zamfara United Feeders	0–3	Kanta Warriors
Adamawa United Academy	3–3 (8–7 p)	El-Kanemi Warriors Feeders
Sporting Supreme U19	5–0	Reigners FC

== Round of 64 ==
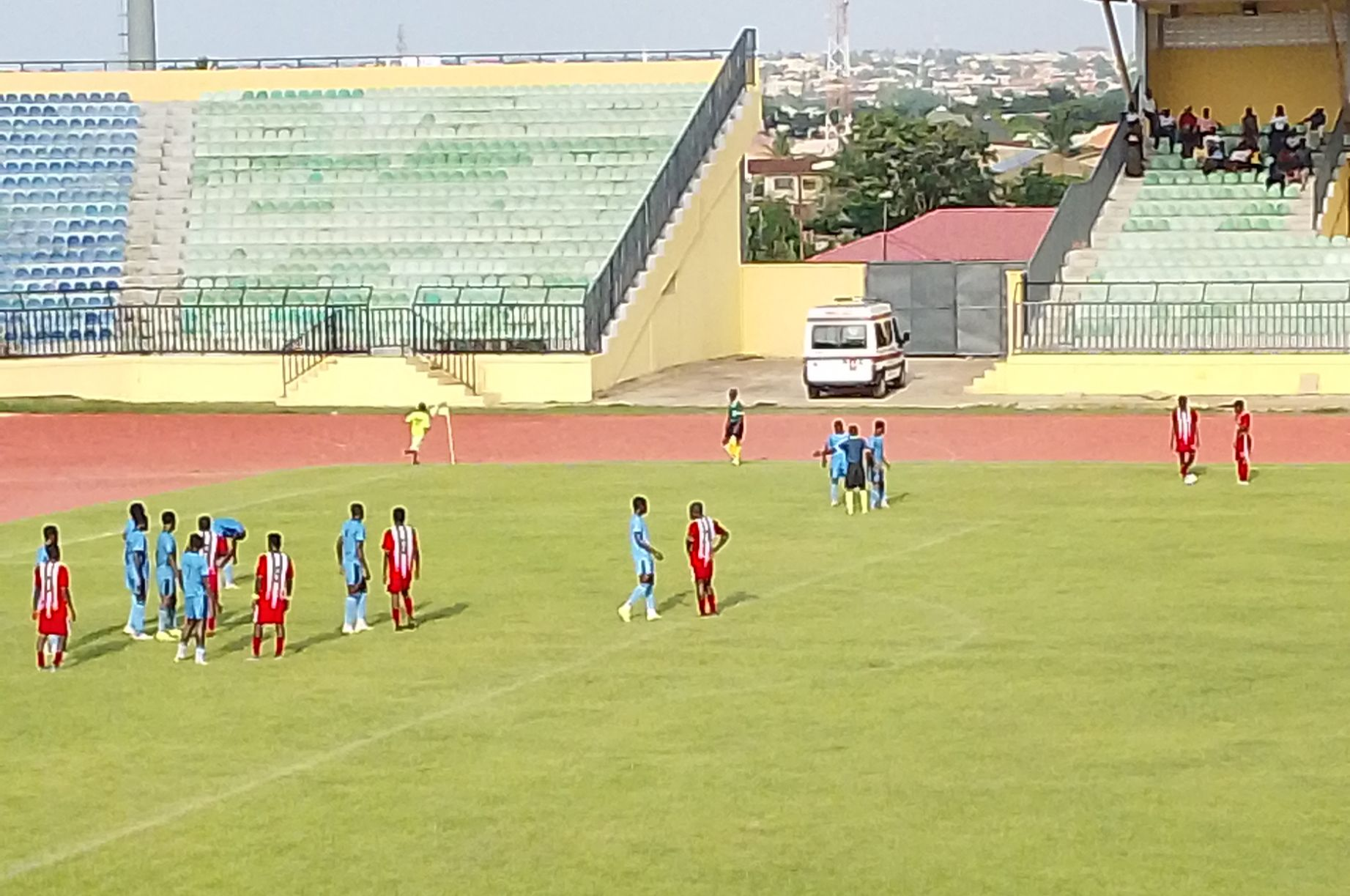
Beyond Limits vs Bida Lions

Matches were played from 19th to 21st May 2026.

Team 1	Score	Team 2
19 May 2026
Kwara United	2–2 (4–2 p)	Sporting Supreme U19
Bayelsa United	2–0	OISA FC
Bendel Insurance	2–1	Katsina United Juniors
Wikki Tourists	2–0	Junior Jigawa Golden Stars
Adamawa United Academy	1–2	Flight FC
Adamawa United	1–1 (5–4 p)	Agbanna
El-Kanemi Warriors	1–0	Krosaders FA
Ikorodu City	4–0	Gaa-Akanbi
Ingas	1–0	Edel
G12 FC	0–2	Rivers United
El-Shama	0–4	Enyimba
Ahudiyannem	1–2	Plateau United
Sunshine Stars U19	2–1	Niger Tornadoes
Akwa United	3–0	Wilbros FC
Zamfara United	0–2	Barau
YSFON Stars	w/o	Gombe United
Katsina United	2–2 (1–3 p)	Sapele Lions
Godswill Akpabio FC	0–1	Enugu Rangers
20 May 2026
Sporting Supreme	3–3 (2–4 p)	Ejigbo City
Nasarawa United	3–1	Westgate FC
Kogi United	0–0 (8–7 p)	Lobi Stars
Kebbi United	1–2	Shooting Stars
Crown FC	2–0	Cynosure
Kanta Warriors	0–3	Basira FC
Sokoto United	0–0 (14–13 p)	Mojoda FC
Jigawa Golden Stars	w/o	E-World United FC
Beyond Limits	1–1 (3–4 p)	Bida Lions
Stormers	0–0 (2–3 p)	Warri Wolves
Mighty Jets	w/o	Adamimogo
Warinje	3–0	Bichi First
21 May 2026
Kada Warriors	2–0	Campos FA
ABU DLC	0–1	Abakaliki

== Round of 32 ==
Matches were played on 1 June.

Team 1	Score	Team 2
Kwara United	0–1	Sokoto United
Sapele Lions	0–0 (3–4 p)	Adamawa United
Bendel Insurance	3–1	Crown FC
El-Kanemi Warriors	1–1 (3–2 p)	Akwa United
Shooting Stars	1–1 (4–5 p)	Kada Warriors
Wikki Tourists	3–1	Bayelsa United
Bida Lions	2–0	Warri Wolves
Flight FC	1–1 (5–4 p)	Mighty Jets
Rivers United	3–2	Enugu Rangers
Ejigbo City	0–3	Nasarawa United
Kogi United	0–1	Plateau United
Ingas	1–1 (7–8 p)	FC Basira
Ikorodu City	2–0	Jigawa Golden Stars
Enyimba	1–0	Gombe United
Sunshine Stars U19	2–1	Warinje
Barau	1–0	Abakaliki

== Round of 16 ==
Matches were played on 6 June.

Team 1	Score	Team 2
Sokoto United	2–0	Adamawa United
Bendel Insurance	3–3 (7–8 p)	El-Kanemi Warriors
Kada Warriors	1–3	Wikki Tourists
Bida Lions	0–1	Flight FC
Rivers United	2–2 (3–5 p)	Nasarawa United
Plateau United	2–1	FC Basira
Ikorodu City	1–1 (5–4 p)	Enyimba
Sunshine Stars U19	1–2	Barau

== Quarter-final ==
Matches were played on 11 June.

Team 1	Score	Team 2
Sokoto United	0–1	El-Kanemi Warriors
Wikki Tourists	1–1 (4–3 p)	Flight FC
Nasarawa United	2–1	Plateau United
Ikorodu City	2–2 (5–4 p)	Barau

== Semi-final ==
Both matches were played on 17 June.

Team 1	Score	Team 2
El-Kanemi Warriors	3–1	Wikki Tourists
Nasarawa United	1–1 (2–4 p)	Ikorodu City

17 June 2026	El-Kanemi Warriors	3–1	Wikki Tourists	Muhammadu Dikko Stadium, Katsina
16:00 (UTC+1)	Abdulrahman; Bashir; Ismail		Imamu (pen.)

17 June 2026	Nasarawa United	1–1 (2–4 p)	Ikorodu City	Samuel Ogbemudia Stadium, Benin City
16:00 (UTC+1)	Amadi 41'		Ayoola 11'
	Penalties
	Penalty scored Penalty missed		Oyedokun (penalty scored); Adeoye (penalty scored); Ayodeji (penalty scored); Ayoola (penalty scored)

== Final ==
The final sees three-time champions El-Kanemi Warriors, competing in their second final in three years face the previous edition semifinalists Ikorodu City.

Team 1	Score	Team 2
El-Kanemi Warriors	1–0	Ikorodu City

11 July 2026	El-Kanemi Warriors	1–0	Ikorodu City	Stephen Keshi Stadium, Asaba
16:00 (UTC+1)	Muktar Ismail 19' (pen.)	Report

== See also ==
- 2026 Nigeria Women's Federation Cup
- 2025–26 Nigeria Premier Football League
- 2025–26 Nigeria National League
- 2025–26 NWFL Premiership
