= El-Kanemi =

El-Kanemi may refer to:

- Muhammad al-Amin al-Kanemi (1776–1837), scholar, teacher, religious and political leader of the Kanem-Borno Empire, present-day Nigeria
- El-Kanemi Warriors F.C., a football team based in Maiduguri, Borno, Nigeria
- El-Kanemi Stadium, a multi-use stadium in Maiduguri, Nigeria
