= 2025–26 Nigeria Premier Football League =

Nigerian association football season

Nigeria Premier Football League
- Season: 2025–26
- Dates: 22 August 2025 – 24 May 2026
- Champions: Enugu Rangers (9th title)
- Relegated: Wikki Tourists; Bayelsa United; El-Kanemi Warriors; Remo Stars
- Champions League: Enugu Rangers; Rivers United
- Confederation Cup: Shooting Stars; El-Kanemi Warriors (as Federation Cup winners)
- Matches: 380
- Goals: 769 (2.02 per match)
- Top goalscorer: 3 players (14 goals)
- Biggest home win: Niger Tornadoes 4–0 Plateau United (19 October 2025); Bendel Insurance 4–0 Ikorodu City (1 March 2026); Kano Pillars 4–0 Bendel Insurance (5 April 2026); Bayelsa United 4–0 Kwara United (24 May 2026)
- Highest scoring: Wikki Tourists 4–4 Katsina United (8 February 2026)
- Longest winning run: Nasarawa United (5 matches)
- Longest unbeaten run: Rivers United (9 matches)
- Longest winless run: Bendel Insurance (8 matches)
- Longest losing run: Kwara United (4 matches)
- All statistics correct as of 24 May 2026.

The 2025–26 Nigeria Premier Football League was the 55th season of Nigeria's top-flight association football league, the 36th since attaining professionalism and the third under the current name. The season commenced on 22 August 2025 and ended on 24 May 2026 with a one-week mid-season break from 30 December to 6 January and another two weeks break from 20 April to 2 May.

After an eventful final matchday, Enugu Rangers were crowned champions after defeating Ikorodu City away at Lagos to remain ahead of Rivers United on the table. Their win was their second in three seasons and their ninth overall, making them joint highest league winners along with Enyimba.

Defending champions Remo Stars were relegated along with El-Kanemi Warriors on the final matchday, as they failed to win their games with Remo Stars relegating on goal difference against Kwara United. Remo Stars became the third defending champion to get relegated the following season, following Shooting Stars in 1999 and Bayelsa United in 2010. They joined Wikki Tourists and Bayelsa United, who had been previously confirmed relegated two weeks prior.

Shooting Stars qualified for a continental tournament for the first time since 1999, qualifying for the 2026–27 CAF Confederation Cup ahead of Ikorodu City despite a loss at the final matchday.

== Teams ==
=== Changes from previous season ===
Twenty teams, consisting of the top sixteen teams from the previous season and four promoted teams from the Nigeria National League, are competing in the league. The promoted teams are NNL champions Warri Wolves, Wikki Tourists who have played previously in the top flight, and newcomers Barau and Kun Khalifat.

▲ Promoted from 2024–25 National League	▼ Relegated to 2025–26 National League
Warri Wolves; Wikki Tourists; Barau; Kun Khalifat	Lobi Stars; Sunshine Stars; Akwa United; Heartland

=== Teams information ===
Locations of the 2025–26 Nigeria Premier Football League teams

The below stadiums are those utilized by the clubs for most of the season, it does not note those that were used by the clubs temporarily.

Team	Kit supplier	Shirt Sponsor	Sleeve Sponsor	Location	Stadium	Capacity
Abia Warriors	Owu	Eunisell		Umuahia	Umuahia Township Stadium	5,000
Barau	Cone sport			Dambatta	Sani Abacha Stadium (Note: Barau play all their home games at Sani Abacha Stadium in Kano as their home stadium Dambatta Stadium, Dambatta is not suitable to host games.)	16,000
Bayelsa United				Yenagoa	Samson Siasia Stadium; Ozoro Stadium	5,000; 10,000
Bendel Insurance	Fourteen	Sterling Bank		Benin City	Samuel Ogbemudia Stadium	12,000
El-Kanemi Warriors				Maiduguri	El-Kanemi Stadium	10,000
Enugu Rangers	Cone sport	Afrinvest Senior Barman	Nortra	Enugu	Nnamdi Azikiwe Stadium	22,000
Enyimba	joma	Stake.com	United Nigeria Airlines	Aba	Enyimba International Stadium	16,000
Ikorodu City	CF moto	Betking	Indomie	Ikorodu, Lagos	Onikan Stadium	10,000
Kano Pillars	AO	RFI hausa		Kano	Sani Abacha Stadium	16,000
Katsina United	S sport			Katsina	Muhammadu Dikko Stadium	35,000
Kun Khalifat	Adidas	Old English Bar & Grills		Owerri	Dan Anyiam Stadium	10,000
Kwara United	Owu	BC Games		Ilorin	Kwara State Stadium	18,000
Nasarawa United	Elite king sport			Lafia	Lafia Township Stadium	10,000
Niger Tornadoes	Ammaz	Niger foods		Minna	Bako Kontagora Stadium	5,000
Plateau United	Cone sport			Jos	New Jos Stadium	44,000
Remo Stars	Dexie	Bet9ja	ValueJet	Ikenne	Remi Stars Stadium (Note: Remo Stars played some of their home games at MKO Abiola Stadium in Abeokuta as their home stadium was undergoing renovation works.)	10,000
Rivers United	Owu			Port Harcourt	Adokiye Amiesimaka Stadium	40,000
Shooting Stars	Pavelet			Ibadan	Lekan Salami Stadium	15,000
Warri Wolves	Tico			Warri	Ozoro Stadium	10,000
Wikki Tourists	M sports			Bauchi	Abubakar Tafawa Balewa Stadium	11,000

== League table ==
Pos	Team	Pld	W	D	L	GF	GA	GD	Pts	
1	Enugu Rangers (C)	38	19	11	8	47	27	+20	68	Qualification for the Champions League
2	Rivers United	38	19	10	9	44	31	+13	67	Qualification for the Champions League
3	Shooting Stars	38	18	6	14	41	40	+1	60	Qualification for the Confederation Cup
4	Ikorodu City	38	16	10	12	43	39	+4	58	
5	Bendel Insurance	38	14	14	10	44	38	+6	56	
6	Nasarawa United	38	16	8	14	37	34	+3	56	
7	Abia Warriors	38	16	7	15	31	34	−3	55	
8	Barau	38	13	13	12	34	30	+4	52	
9	Katsina United	38	14	10	14	36	39	−3	52	
10	Plateau United	38	15	5	18	39	40	−1	50	
11	Enyimba	38	13	10	15	44	42	+2	49	
12	Kun Khalifat	38	13	10	15	42	40	+2	49	
13	Warri Wolves	38	13	10	15	36	41	−5	49	
14	Niger Tornadoes	38	13	9	16	37	36	+1	48	
15	Kano Pillars (Note: Kano Pillars were deducted 3 points and 3 goals due to match violence.)	38	15	6	17	34	39	−5	48	
16	Kwara United (Note: Kwara United were deducted 3 points and 3 goals due to match violence.)	38	13	11	14	32	36	−4	47	
17	Remo Stars	38	14	5	19	42	47	−5	47	Relegation to the National League
18	El-Kanemi Warriors	38	13	8	17	27	46	−19	47	Qualification for the CAF Confederation Cup and Relegation to the National League (Note: El-Kanemi Warriors qualified for the CAF Confederation Cup as the 2026 Nigeria Federation Cup winners)
19	Bayelsa United	38	11	10	17	37	42	−5	43	Relegation to the National League
20	Wikki Tourists	38	9	13	16	36	48	−12	40	Relegation to the National League

Source: NPFL
Rules for classification: 1) points; 2) goal difference; 3) number of goals scored
(C) Champions

== Results ==
Home \ Away	ABW	BAR	BAY	BEN	ELK	ENU	ENY	IKR	KAN	KAT	KUN	KWA	NAS	NIG	PLA	REM	RIV	3SC	WWV	WIK
Abia Warriors		2–0	1–0	0–0	2–0	0–0	0–0	2–1	1–0	1–0	0–2	1–0	1–2	2–1	1–1	2–0	1–1	2–0	1–0	1–1
Barau	2–0		1–1	1–1	3–0	2–0	0–0	1–0	2–1	0–0	1–0	3–2	3–0	2–1	2–1	2–1	4–1	0–1	0–1	0–0
Bayelsa United	2–1	2–0		0–0	0–1	0–2	0–2	1–1	4–1	1–1	1–2	4–0	1–2	0–0	2–1	2–1	1–0	2–0	2–1	0–1
Bendel Insurance	1–0	0–0	1–1		3–2	1–1	2–0	4–0	3–2	1–0	2–1	2–0	0–1	1–0	2–2	1–1	0–0	1–1	1–1	3–0
El-Kanemi Warriors	2–0	0–0	1–0	2–0		0–0	3–2	1–0	2–1	1–1	w/o (Note: The match between El-Kanemi Warriors and Kun Khalifat was awarded as a 3–0 win for El-Kanemi Warriors by the league body after Kun Khalifat failed to show up for the game.)	2–0	1–0	0–0	1–0	1–1	0–0	1–2	1–0	2–1
Enugu Rangers	2–0	0–0	4–1	2–1	2–0		2–1	2–1	2–0	1–0	0–0	0–0	2–0	1–0	2–0	4–1	0–0	1–0	4–2	2–0
Enyimba	2–1	0–0	1–0	3–2	3–0	2–1		0–1	2–0	3–0	1–1	3–1	0–0	1–0	2–0	2–1	0–0	3–0	1–2	0–1
Ikorodu City	1–0	2–0	1–1	1–0	0–0	1–2	1–1		3–0	0–0	2–0	1–0	2–0	2–0	2–1	1–0	1–0	1–0	4–3	3–1
Kano Pillars	0–1	1–0	0–0	4–0	3–0	1–0	2–0	2–1		1–0	2–1	1–0	3–0	0–2	2–1	1–0	2–1	1–1	1–0	1–1
Katsina United	2–0	1–1	3–2	0–1	1–0	0–0	3–2	4–1	1–0		2–0	1–2	1–0	1–0	0–0	3–1	1–1	1–0	0–1	1–0
Kun Khalifat	0–1	1–3	1–0	1–1	3–1	1–2	1–0	2–2	2–1	0–1		1–0	1–1	2–0	2–0	1–2	0–1	2–0	3–0	3–1
Kwara United	0–1	2–1	2–0	0–1	3–0	0–0	2–0	0–0	1–1	1–0	2–0		1–0	2–0	2–1	3–1	1–1	0–0	2–1	1–0
Nasarawa United	1–0	0–0	1–1	1–0	3–0	2–1	1–1	1–0	0–1	2–0	0–1	1–1		2–1	1–0	2–1	4–1	1–0	3–0	1–0
Niger Tornadoes	1–2	2–0	1–0	2–2	3–0	0–0	2–0	4–2	0–0	2–0	1–1	2–2	1–0		4–0	1–0	1–0	1–0	0–0	2–0
Plateau United	0–1	2–0	1–0	1–0	1–0	2–1	2–1	4–1	1–0	1–2	1–1	1–0	0–0	3–0		2–0	1–2	4–1	1–0	1–0
Remo Stars	1–1	2–0	2–1	2–3	2–1	0–1	2–1	1–0	1–0	2–0	1–1	3–1	2–1	3–0	1–2		1–1	1–0	1–0	2–0
Rivers United	3–0	1–0	1–2	3–1	3–0	1–0	1–1	0–0	1–0	3–0	4–2	1–0	1–0	1–0	1–0	1–0		1–0	2–1	1–0
Shooting Stars	2–0	1–0	0–1	1–0	1–0	3–1	3–0	1–1	2–1	1–1	2–1	0–0	3–2	2–1	1–0	1–0	2–1		4–2	3–2
Warri Wolves	2–1	0–0	2–0	0–0	0–0	2–0	2–1	0–2	0–0	2–0	1–1	0–0	1–0	1–1	1–0	1–0	2–0	1–2		2–2
Wikki Tourists	1–0	0–0	1–1	1–2	2–1	2–2	2–2	0–0	2–0	4–4	0–0	1–1	1–1	1–0	1–0	2–1	2–3	2–0	0–1	

Source: NPFL
Legend: Blue = home team win; Yellow = draw; Red = away team win.

== Positions by round ==
To preserve chronological evolvements, any postponed matches are not included to the round at which they were originally scheduled, but added to the full round they were played immediately afterwards. For example, if a match is scheduled for round 7, but then played between rounds 8 and 9, it will be added to the standings for round 8.

Team ╲ Round	1	2	3	4	5	6	7	8	9	10	11	12	13	14	15	16	17	18	19	20	21	22	23	24	25	26	27	28	29	30	31	32	33	34	35	36	37	38
Abia Warriors	2	11	14	11	11	4	4	2	3	2	2	2	4	4	6	5	4	3	2	2	2	3	4	5	5	5	5	5	4	6	5	6	4	4	4	6	7	7
Barau	9	19	17	20	20	18	19	20	18	18	19	18	17	19	18	19	19	17	17	15	14	15	15	13	14	12	13	10	12	9	11	12	11	9	10	8	9	8
Bayelsa United	3	1	3	8	12	13	14	11	13	16	12	13	10	10	11	14	10	13	15	17	13	13	13	16	15	15	17	14	16	13	15	14	16	17	19	19	19	19
Bendel Insurance	20	17	16	14	15	15	17	19	19	19	18	19	19	18	17	15	15	10	9	8	6	8	8	8	6	6	6	6	7	7	7	7	7	7	7	5	6	5
El-Kanemi Warriors	1	3	7	13	6	10	7	12	7	8	11	14	9	13	15	16	17	16	11	10	11	9	10	9	8	8	9	8	8	8	10	10	12	11	11	13	13	18
Enugu Rangers	14	18	11	17	17	17	5	7	12	12	13	5	7	5	8	4	6	5	6	6	5	4	5	3	4	2	2	2	2	2	1	2	1	2	1	1	1	1
Enyimba	10	7	9	1	1	2	2	3	8	10	7	8	11	14	10	13	8	9	8	12	12	12	12	12	13	14	14	15	17	15	16	15	15	13	13	11	15	11
Ikorodu City	11	12	13	7	10	11	12	9	5	5	3	3	1	2	1	2	3	4	3	3	3	5	3	4	1	1	1	3	5	3	4	3	3	3	3	3	4	4
Kano Pillars	15	13	18	16	16	19	16	17	20	20	20	20	20	20	20	20	20	20	18	18	19	19	18	19	17	17	16	17	15	16	14	16	14	15	12	14	10	15
Katsina United	16	8	5	9	4	6	11	6	11	7	10	10	13	8	9	11	11	13	10	9	10	11	11	11	11	9	7	9	11	11	8	8	9	10	8	9	8	9
Kun Khalifat	12	15	19	15	18	20	20	18	14	14	15	17	18	17	16	18	18	19	20	20	20	20	20	20	20	20	18	19	18	20	19	20	20	20	18	17	14	12
Kwara United	13	16	10	12	13	7	13	14	10	11	8	9	12	12	14	10	13	8	12	14	16	17	19	17	18	19	20	20	19	18	20	18	18	16	15	16	11	16
Nasarawa United	17	10	12	5	2	1	1	1	1	1	1	1	2	1	2	1	2	2	4	5	4	2	2	2	3	4	3	4	3	4	3	4	5	6	6	7	5	6
Niger Tornadoes	4	9	6	10	3	5	8	8	4	3	5	7	5	6	4	6	5	7	5	7	9	7	7	7	9	10	12	13	13	14	13	11	13	12	14	15	18	14
Plateau United	18	20	20	18	19	16	18	15	17	15	16	15	16	16	19	17	16	18	19	19	18	18	16	14	12	13	10	12	10	12	9	9	8	8	9	10	12	10
Remo Stars	7	4	1	6	8	14	10	13	15	17	17	16	15	11	13	9	12	15	16	13	15	16	17	18	19	18	19	18	20	19	18	17	17	19	16	18	16	17
Rivers United	8	6	8	2	5	3	3	4	9	9	6	4	3	3	3	3	1	1	1	1	1	1	1	1	2	3	4	1	1	1	2	1	2	1	2	2	2	2
Shooting Stars	19	14	15	19	14	8	6	5	2	6	9	11	14	15	5	7	7	6	7	4	7	6	6	6	7	7	8	7	6	5	6	5	6	5	5	4	3	3
Warri Wolves	5	2	4	3	7	12	9	10	6	4	4	6	8	9	7	8	9	12	13	11	8	10	9	10	10	11	11	11	9	10	12	13	10	14	17	12	17	13
Wikki Tourists	6	5	2	4	9	9	15	16	16	13	14	12	6	7	12	12	14	14	14	16	17	14	14	15	16	16	15	16	14	17	17	19	19	18	20	20	20	20

Leader
Qualification for the Champions League
Qualification for the Confederation Cup
Relegation to Nigeria National League

Source: World Football

== Season statistics ==
=== Scoring ===
==== Top scorers ====
As of 24 May 2026

Rank	Player	Club	Goals
1	(Nigeria) Jonathan Mairiga	Wikki Tourists	14
1	(Nigeria) Victor Mbaoma	Remo Stars	14
1	(Nigeria) Godwin Obaje	Enugu Rangers	14
4	(Nigeria) Joseph Arumala	Ikorodu City	12
4	(Nigeria) Uche Collins	Katsina United	12
6	(Nigeria) Chukwuemeka Obioma	Abia Warriors	11
6	(Nigeria) Michael Chidera	Enyimba	11
8	(Nigeria) Daddy Abdulrahman	El-Kanemi Warriors	10
8	(Nigeria) Evwierhurhoma Igbunu	Warri Wolves	10
8	(Nigeria) Alex Oweilayefa	Bendel Insurance	10

==== Hat-tricks ====
As of 29 March 2026

Player	For	Against	Result	Date
Abdulaziz Dalhatu	Niger Tornadoes	Plateau United	4–0 (H)	19 October 2025
Uche Collins	Katsina United	Wikki Tourists	4–4 (A)	8 February 2026
Alex Oweilayefa	Bendel Insurance	Ikorodu City	4–0 (H)	1 March 2026
Evwierhurhoma Igbunu	Warri Wolves	Ikorodu City	3–4 (A)	29 March 2026

=== Top Assisters ===
As of 24 May 2026

Rank	Player	Club	Assists
1	(Nigeria) Ayobami Junior	Shooting Stars	13
2	(Nigeria) Kazeem Adeyanju	Plateau United	7
3	(Nigeria) Chibueze Oputa	Enugu Rangers	6
3	(Nigeria) Hadi Haruna	Remo Stars	6
5	(Nigeria) Mubarak Sani	Katsina United	5
5	(Nigeria) Shehu Dabai	Niger Tornadoes	5
7	(Nigeria) Kabiru Tijani	Shooting Stars	4
7	(Nigeria) Bala Imamu	Wikki Tourists	4
7	(Nigeria) Ahmed Musa	Kano Pillars	4
7	(Nigeria) Rabiu Ali	Kano Pillars	4

=== Top Cleansheets ===
As of 24 May 2026

Rank	Player	Club	Cleansheets
1	(Nigeria) Michael Atata	Ikorodu City	16
2	(Nigeria) Lucky Jimoh	Enugu Rangers	15
3	(Nigeria) Osagie Onisodumeya	Rivers United	14
4	(Nigeria) Ifeanyi Emmanuel	Niger Tornadoes	13
5	(Nigeria) Okiemute Odah	Abia Warriors	12
5	(Nigeria) Abuchi Okeke	Kano Pillars	12
7	(Nigeria) Kelvin Ogunga	Enyimba	11
7	(Nigeria) Godwill Utum	Wikki Tourists	11
7	(Nigeria) Abdullahi Zalli	Katsina United	11
10	(Nigeria) Vincent Edafe	Warri Wolves	10

== Attendances ==
Nigerian Premier Football League clubs ranked by average home league attendance:

Pos	Club	Average attendance
1	Enugu Rangers	12,574
2	Kano Pillars	7,736
3	Shooting Stars	4,683
4	Kwara United	4,118
5	Niger Tornadoes	3,791
6	Enyimba FC	3,628
7	Ikorodu City	3,184
8	Remo Stars	2,417
9	Plateau United	2,163
10	Nasarawa United	1,783
11	El-Kanemi Warriors	1,694
12	Bendel Insurance	1,583
13	Barau FC	1,274
14	Warri Wolves	1,086
15	Wikki Tourists	947
16	Kun Khalifat FC	863
17	Abia Warriors	674
18	Bayelsa United	583
19	Katsina United	427
20	Rivers United	203

== See also ==
- 2026 Nigeria Federation Cup
- 2026 Nigeria Women's Federation Cup
- 2025–26 Nigeria National League
- 2025–26 NWFL Premiership
