= Justin Onwudiwe =

Nigerian footballer

Justin Maxwell Onwudiwe was a Nigerian international footballer. He started playing football when he was a young boy in the 1930s. At the time football was not well organized in the country and the boys sometimes used tennis balls. He attended St Peter's CMS School, Enugu and College of The Immaculate Conception. In 1947, immediately after secondary school, he was recruited for work and play by U.G. Urion of the railway in Lagos. The Lagos Railways were a formidable group and won the Challenge Cup in 1948, 1949, 1951 and 1956. A defender, he was selected for the Nigerian team that toured the United Kingdom in 1949.
