= Salisu Yusuf =

Nigerian footballer and manager

Salisu Yusuf (born 1962 in Zaria, Kaduna State, Nigeria) is a Nigerian professional football manager and former player. He was the chief coach of the Nigeria national football team.

== Career ==
=== Playing career ===
Yusuf spent all his playing career in the Nigerian League and represented Nigeria at both junior and senior levels. He started his playing career as a midfielder for ABU Football Club before he went on to play for several Nigerian football clubs including Ranchers Bees and El-Kanemi Warriors

=== Life and career ===
Yusuf is a Nigeria professional football manager and formal player.He was the head coach of the Nigeria national team career in 2002 as the League side Nasarawa United before he moved to Lobi Stars as an assistant coach and helping them win the National Challenge Cup (now Nigerian FA Cup) in 2003. He later moved to Dolphins F.C. where he worked as assistant coach until 2008 when he joined Kano Pillars as chief coach and eventually led them to win the 2008 Nigeria Premier League title.

In 2009, the Nigeria Football Federation employed Yusuf as assistant coach to Samson Siasia who was serving as the head coach of the Nigeria national football team. Yusuf was still working with Siasia when Kano Pillars appointed him as technical adviser in 2010, a move that saw the club qualify for the 2010 CAF Champions League. In November 2012, he moved to Enyimba where he replaced Austin Eguavoen as technical adviser and guiding them to win the 2013 Federation Cup trophy.

Upon leaving Enyimba Football Club, Yusuf joined El-Kanemi Warriors as technical adviser before he went on to be named assistant coach to Stephen Keshi who was serving as head coach of the Nigerian senior football team. On 24 October 2016, he was officially appointed by the Nigeria Football Federation as the chief coach of the Nigeria national football team.

On 24 July 2018, Salisu Yusuf was seen accepting a cash gift in a video released by BBC Africa following a series of investigations on the state of football in Africa. Yusuf was said to have accepted bribe after two investigative reporters approached him to include two footballers in his squad at the 2018 African Championship (CHAN). The BBC did however state in the documentary that there was no evidence that the cash received by Salisu Yusuf affected any decisions he made in the player selection process. Salisu Yusuf subsequently denied any wrongdoing, stating that the inducement did not affect his decision to field the players.

In November 2019 he became manager of Rangers International.

In December 2021 he was unveiled as Coach of Kano Pillars became manager of Kano Pillars F.C.

== Honours ==
- Nigerian FA Cup: 2003, 2013
- Nigeria Premier League: 2008
