= NEPA Lagos F.C. =

Nigerian football club

NEPA Lagos was a Nigerian football team based in Lagos, which participated in the top league in Nigeria in 1974, 1995 and 1996. The club was owned by the National Electric Power Authority (NEPA) of Nigeria and was previously known as Lagos ECN. It won the Nigerian FA Cup in 1960, 1965 and 1970.

== Honours ==
- Nigeria Challenge Cup – 1960, 1965, 1970
