= Nigeria Federation Cup =

Nigerian football competition

- Founded: 1942
- Teams: 74
- Qualifier for: Nigeria Super Cup; CAF Confederation Cup
- Current champions: El-Kanemi Warriors (4th title)
- Most championships: Shooting Stars FC (8 titles)
- 2026 Nigeria Federation Cup

The Nigeria Federation Cup is the main football single-elimination tournament in Nigeria usually contested by 74 teams, representing the 36 states and the FCT of Nigeria. It is the Nigerian domestic cup and the Nigerian equivalent of the FA Cup, Emperor's Cup, Copa do Brasil, Coupe de France, and Hrvatski nogometni kup, among others. The tournament was created in 1945 as the "Governor's Cup", succeeding the War Memorial Challenge Cup that had been limited to teams from Lagos.

The tournament, as the Governor's Cup, was initially dominated by Lagosian teams, later it was known as the Nigeria FA Cup from (1954–1959), Nigeria Challenge Cup (1960–1998), Coca-Cola FA Cup (1999–2008) and Nigeria Federation Cup (2009–2016). Between 2017 and 2022, the competition was sponsored by the AITEO group and known as the AITEO Cup including the women's tournament.

On 8 August 2021, Bayelsa became the first state to have two clubs win the FA cup in the men's and women's editions in the same year. Shooting Stars are the most successful club, having won the competition eight times, followed by the defunct Lagos Railways with 7 titles and Enugu Rangers with six titles.

El-Kanemi Warriors are the current champions, with the 2026 tournament victory giving them their fourth Nigeria FA Cup title.

== Format ==
The competition is a single elimination knockout tournament featuring 74 teams from the 36 states and 1 from the FCT in Nigeria. All clubs qualify via their states cup championships, the winners and runners-up of each state cup championship qualifies for the tournament regardless of their position at the Nigerian football league system. A 'Rookie' play-off will be held for the 20 lowest ranked clubs, the 10 winners then joins the remaining 54 at the first round. All matches are held at neutral venues.

The winner qualifies automatically for the next season's CAF Confederation Cup or the runners-up if the winner had already qualified for a CAF club competition based on league's position.

== Finals ==
Year	Winners	Score	Runners-up
War Memorial Challenge Cup
1942	ZAC Bombers	1–0	Services
1943	Lagos Marine	3–2	RAF
1944	Lagos Railways	2–0	Marine
1945	Lagos Railways	1–1 (4–1)	Lagos United
Governors Cup
1945	Marine	1–0	Corinthians
1946	Lagos Railways	3–1	Port Harcourt FC
1947	Marine	3–1	Lagos Railways
1948	Lagos Railways	1–0	Warri
1949	Lagos Railways	3–0	Port Harcourt FC
1950	Lagos UAC	3–2	Port Harcourt FC
1951	Lagos Railways	3–2	Jos Plateau Highlanders
1952	Lagos PAN Bank	6–0	Warri
1953	Kano Pillars	2–1	Lagos Dynamos
FA Cup
1954	St. Patrick's College	3–0	Kano Pillars
1955	Port Harcourt FC	4–1	Warri
1956	Lagos Railways	3–1	Warri
1957	Lagos Railways	5–1	Zaria
1958	Port Harcourt FC	6–0	Federal United
1959	Ibadan Lions	1–0	Police
Challenge Cup
1960	Lagos ECN	5–2	Ibadan Lions
1961	Ibadan Lions	1–0	Lagos UAC
1962	Police	1–0	Jos Plateau Highlanders
1963	Port Harcourt FC	1–0	Jos Plateau Highlanders
1964	Lagos Railways	3–1	Jos Plateau Highlanders
1965	Lagos ECN	3–1	Jos Plateau Highlanders
1966	Ibadan Lions	w/o	Jos Plateau Highlanders
1967	Stationery Stores	3–1	Jos Plateau Highlanders
1968	Stationery Stores	3–1 (replay)	Plateau United
1969	Ibadan Lions	5–1	Warri
1970	Lagos ECN	3–1	Mighty Jets
1971	WNDC Ibadan	2–1	Enugu Rangers
1972	Bendel Insurance	2–2 (3–2 replay)	Mighty Jets
1973	No competition		
1974	Enugu Rangers	2–0	Mighty Jets
1975	Enugu Rangers	1–0	Shooting Stars
1976	Enugu Rangers	2–0	Alyufsalam Rocks
1977	Shooting Stars	2–0	Racca Rovers
1978	Bendel Insurance	3–0	Enugu Rangers
1979	Shooting Stars	2–0	Sharks FC
1980	Bendel Insurance	1–0	Stationery Stores
1981	Enugu Rangers	2–0	Bendel Insurance
1982	Stationery Stores	4–1	Niger Tornadoes
1983	Enugu Rangers	0–0 (5–4 p)	DIC Bees
1984	Leventis United	1–0	Abiola Babes
1985	Abiola Babes	0–0 (6–5 p)	BCC Lions
1986	Leventis United	1–0	Abiola Babes
1987	Abiola Babes	1–1 (7–6 p)	Ranchers Bees
1988	Iwuanyanwu Nationale	3–0	Flash Flamingoes
1989	BCC Lions	1–0	Iwuanyanwu Nationale
1990	Stationery Stores	0–0 (5–4 p)	Enugu Rangers
1991	El-Kanemi Warriors	3–2	Kano Pillars
1992	El-Kanemi Warriors	1–0	Stationery Stores
1993	BCC Lions	1–0	Plateau United
1994	BCC Lions	1–0	Julius Berger
1995	Shooting Stars	2–0	Katsina United
1996	Julius Berger	1–0 (a.p.)	Katsina United
1997	BCC Lions	1–0	Katsina United
1998	Wikki Tourists	0-0(a.e.t.)(3–2 p)	Plateau United
Coca-Cola FA Cup
1999	Plateau United	1–0	Iwuanyanwu Nationale
2000	Niger Tornadoes	1–0	Enugu Rangers
2001	Dolphins FC	2–0	El-Kanemi Warriors
2002	Julius Berger	3–0	Yobe Desert Stars
2003	Lobi Stars	2–0	Sharks FC
2004	Dolphins FC	1–0	Enugu Rangers
2005	Enyimba	1–1(a.e.t.)(6–5 p)	Lobi Stars
2006	Dolphins FC	2-2(a.e.t.)(5–3 p)	Bendel Insurance
2007	Dolphins FC	1–1(a.e.t.)(3–2 p)	Enugu Rangers
2008	Ocean Boys	2–2 (a.e.t.)(7–6 p)	Gombe United
Federation Cup
2009	Enyimba	1–0	Sharks FC
2010	Kaduna United	3–3 (a.e.t.)(3–2 p)	Enyimba
2011	Heartland	1–0	Enyimba
2012	Heartland	2–1	Lobi Stars
2013	Enyimba	2–2 (a.e.t.) (5–4 p)	Warri Wolves
2014	Enyimba	2–1	Dolphins FC
2015	Akwa United	2–1	Lobi Stars
2016	Ifeanyi Ubah	0–0 (5–4 p)	Nasarawa United
2017	Akwa United	0–0 (3–2 p)	Niger Tornadoes
2018	Enugu Rangers	3–3 (4–3 p)	Kano Pillars
2019	Kano Pillars	0–0 (4–3 p)	Niger Tornadoes
2020	Cancelled (Note: The 2020 edition was cancelled due to the COVID-19 pandemic)		
2021	Bayelsa United	2–2 (4–3 p)	Nasarawa United
2022	Abandoned at the quarter-finals		
2023	Bendel Insurance	1–0	Enugu Rangers
2024	El-Kanemi Warriors	2–0	Abia Warriors
2025	Kwara United	0–0 (4–3 p)	Abakaliki
2026	El-Kanemi Warriors	1–0	Ikorodu City

== Performance by club (not including War Memorial Cup) ==
Club	Winners	Runners-up	Years won
Shooting Stars (Ibadan) [includes Ibadan Lions and WNDC]	8	2	1959, 1961, 1966, 1969, 1971, 1977, 1979, 1995
Lagos Railways (Lagos)	7	1	1946, 1948, 1949, 1951, 1956, 1957, 1964
Enugu Rangers (Enugu)	6	7	1974, 1975, 1976, 1981, 1983, 2018
Bendel Insurance (Benin City)	4	2	1972, 1978, 1980, 2021
Stationery Stores (Lagos)	4	2	1967, 1968, 1982, 1990
Enyimba (Aba)	4	2	2005, 2009, 2013, 2014
BCC Lions (Gboko)	4	1	1989, 1993, 1994, 1997
El-Kanemi Warriors (Maiduguri)	4	1	1991, 1992, 2024, 2026
Dolphins FC (Port-Harcourt) [formerly known as Eagle Cement]	4	1	2001, 2004, 2006, 2007
Port Harcourt FC (Port Harcourt)	3	3	1955, 1958, 1963
Iwuanyanwu Nationale/Heartland (Owerri)	3	2	1988, 2011, 2012
Lagos ECN (Lagos) (later renamed NEPA)	3	–	1960, 1965, 1970
Kano Pillars (Kano)	2	3	1953, 2019
Abiola Babes (Abeokuta)	2	2	1985, 1987
Julius Berger (Lagos)	2	1	1996, 2002
Akwa United (Uyo)	2	–	2015, 2017
Leventis United (Ibadan)	2	–	1984, 1986
Marine (Lagos)	2	–	1945, 1947
Lobi Stars (Makurdi)	1	3	2003
Niger Tornadoes (Minna)	1	3	2000
Plateau United (Jos)	1	3	1999
Lagos UAC (Lagos)	1	1	1950
Police (Lagos)	1	1	1962
St Patrick's College (Calabar)	1	–	1954
Ifeanyi Ubah (Nnewi)	1	–	2016
Kaduna United (Kaduna)	1	–	2010
Lagos PAN Bank (Lagos)	1	–	1952
Ocean Boys (Brass)	1	–	2008
Wikki Tourists (Bauchi)	1	–	1998
Bayelsa United (Yenagoa)	1	–	2021
Kwara United (Ilorin)	1	–	2025
Mighty Jets [Jos Plateau Highlanders] (Jos)	–	10	–
Warri (Warri)	–	5	–
Katsina United (Katsina)	–	3	–
Sharks FC (Port Harcourt)	–	3	–
Nasarawa United (Nasarawa)	–	2	–
Ranchers Bees [DIC Bees] (Kaduna)	–	2	–
Corinthians (Lagos)	–	1	–
Federal United (Abuja)	–	1	–
Flash Flamingoes (Uromi)	–	1	–
Lagos Dynamos (Lagos)	–	1	–
Racca Rovers (Kano)	–	1	–
Alyufasalam Rocks (Ilorin)	–	1	–
Gombe United (Gombe)	–	1	–
Yobe Desert Stars (Damaturu)	–	1	–
Warri Wolves (Warri)	–	1	–
Abia Warriors (Umuahia)	–	1	–
Abakaliki (Abakaliki)	–	1	–
Ikorodu City (Lagos)	–	1	–
