= Eugene Agagbe =

Nigerian Football Manager (born 1970)

Personal information
- Full name: Eugene Terseer Agagbe
- Date of birth: 24-05-1970
- Place of birth: Makurdi
- Height: 1.75 m (5 ft 9 in)

Team information
- Current team: Barau FC (Technical Adviser)

Managerial career
- Years: Team
- 2008-2014: Lobi Stars F.C (Feeder Team Coach)
- 2015: Bayelsa United (Assistant Coach)
- 2016-2022: Lobi Stars F.C (Technical Director Youth Team)
- 2023-2024: Lobi Stars FC (Chief Coach)

Eugene Agagbe (born 24 may 1970) is a Nigerian football manager and former professional player who played as a forward. Eugene Agagbe had a diverse football career that spanned several clubs, beginning his playing career with Lobi Bank FC in 1991 then went to play for clubs like Kano Pillars (1992), Obeya Babes (1993), Rangers International F.C. (1994-1995) BCC Lions (1996-1998), Julius Berger F.C (1999-2000), Bendel Insurance F.C. (2001-2002), Lobi Stars F.C. (2003-2004). Eugene Agagbe after a successful playing career, In 2004 he retired at the age of 34 and ventured into football coaching.

== Career ==
Eugene Agagbe began his coaching career in 2007 at the grassroots level after retiring and progressed through the ladder establishing himself today as an elite coach with a CAF B License. From 2008 to 2015, he worked as a youth coach of the Lobi Stars Feeders team, playing an instrumental role in the development of prominent Nigerian professional football players like Anthony Okpotu and Moses Orkuma. In 2015 Eugene Agagbe was announced as the assistant coach of Nigeria Premier Football League Club Side Bayelsa United, working closely with the Technical Adviser, Evans Ogenyi. In 2015 Eugene Agagbe made his second return to Lobi Stars FC Makurdi and was appointed as Technical Director of Youth Football. In 2022 he was appointed Assistant Coach of Lobi Stars FC Makurdi and later made the interim coach same year. On 30 September 2023, Eugene Agagbe was made the Chief Coach of Lobi Stars FC with his first game ending in a 2-2 draw away from home against Heartland F.C. of Owerri in Owerri, a result that boldly introduced him to Nigerian top flight football as a manager. He then went on to top the Nigerian Premier Football League table log and contest for a continental slot but slightly lost out at the dying minute, a situation attributed to the club’s financial challenges, which led to playing their home matches away from home, the Lafia Township Stadium serving as their adopted home ahead of their traditional home ground, Aper Aku Stadium Makurdi. Amidst these challenges, Eugene Agagbe and his Lobi Stars side ended on position 6th with 58 points, a record no NPFL club playing home matches away from home holds till date. 2024-2025 season, prior to the beginning of the new season, Lobi Stars FC Makurdi had a management shakeup, dissolving the old management and constituting a new management, who later sacked Eugene Agagbe and employed the services of Ex-Nigerian international Daniel Amokachi. Eugene Agagbe left Lobi Stars FC Makurdi on position 15th of the Nigerian Premier Football League Table, after 4 matches played with 4 points but Lobi Stars FC later relegated that season under the watch of Tony Bolus. 2025-2026 Season: After five matches of poor performance, NPFL debutant Barau FC, employed Eugene Agagbe as chief coach to assist Ladan Bosso the technical Adviser. At the end of first stanza of the 2025-2026 Nigeria Premier Football League Season, due to poor performance, relegation threatening Barau FC asked Ladan Bosso to step aside and Eugene Agagbe step in as Technical Adviser. As of the time of takeover, Barau FC were sitting on 19th position of the Nigeria Premier Football League Log, Kick starting the second stanza, Eugene Agagbe and his Barau FC side went 7 matches unbeaten, a record that reintroduced him to the spotlight of Nigerian Premier Football league elite coaches.

== International Coaching Career ==
At the national level, Eugene Agagbe presently serves as the Chief Coach of the NPFL U-19 Youth Team.

== Honours ==
Benue State FA Cup Champions 2023-2024
