= Imama Amapakabo =

Nigerian football manager

Personal information
- Date of birth: 27 July 1969 (age 57)
- Place of birth: Nigeria
- Position: Goalkeeper

Senior career*
Years	Team	Apps	(Gls)
- Sharks F.C.

Managerial career
- Rangers International F.C.
- El-Kanemi Warriors F.C.
- 2020-: Abia Warriors F.C.
- * Club domestic league appearances and goals

Imama Amapakabo (born 27 July 1969) is a Nigerian football manager and a former football player.

== Career ==
After being part of the Nigeria squad that won the inaugural FIFA U-16 World Championship in 1985, Amapakabo's parents stopped being opposed to him playing football.

During a game against Nigerdock while playing for Sharks, he stopped a game to "take a toilet break" but was actually trying to ease the pressure on his team. Despite this, Sharks lost 1-0 due to an error from Amapakabo.

In 2016, Amapakabo helped Rangers International win the Nigerian league despite being one of the youngest head coaches in the league.
