= Stade Municipal de Avrankou =

Sports venue in Avrankou, Benin

- Stade Municipal de Avrankou
- Interactive map of Stade Municipal de Avrankou
- Full name: Stade Municipal de Avrankou
- Location: Avrankou, Benin
- Coordinates: 6.5683°N 2.6503°E
- Capacity: 5,000

Tenant
- Avrankou Omnisport FC

Stade Municipal de Avrankou is a multi-use stadium in Avrankou, Benin. It is currently used mostly for football matches and is the home ground of Avrankou Omnisport FC of the Benin Premier League. The stadium has a capacity of 5,000 spectators.
