= Abubakar Tafawa Balewa Stadium =

Multi-use stadium in Nigeria

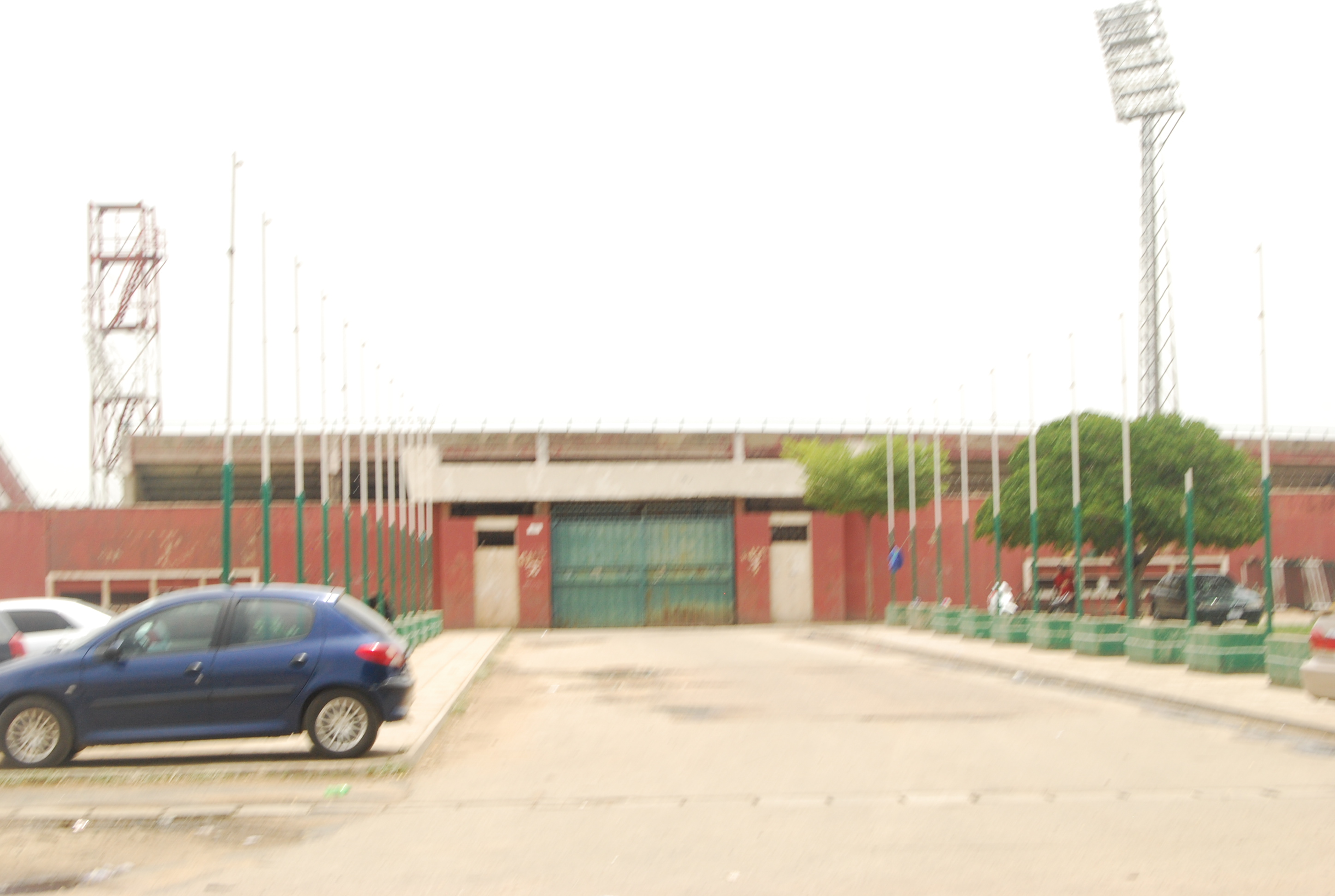
- Abubakar Tafawa Balewa Stadium Bauchi Entry Gate
- Interactive map of Abubakar Tafawa Balewa Stadium
- Location: Bauchi
- Coordinates: 10.3199°N 9.8356°E
- Capacity: 15,000

Construction
- Opened: 1985

Tenant
- Wikki Tourists

Abubakar Tafawa Balewa Stadium is a multi-use stadium in Bauchi, Nigeria. It is currently used mostly for football matches and is the home stadium of Wikki Tourists. The stadium has a capacity of 15,000 and was opened in 1985 and named after Nigeria's first prime minister, Tafawa Balewa. In 2024, the Bauchi State Government announced plans to remodel the stadium to a 30,000-capacity venue in partnership with private investors.

Abubakar Tafawa Balewa Stadium was one of the 8 venues used for the 2009 FIFA U-17 World Cup held in Nigeria, hosting 3 matches. Its first game at the tournament between Nigeria and Argentina at the group stage recorded an attendance of 11,467 people.

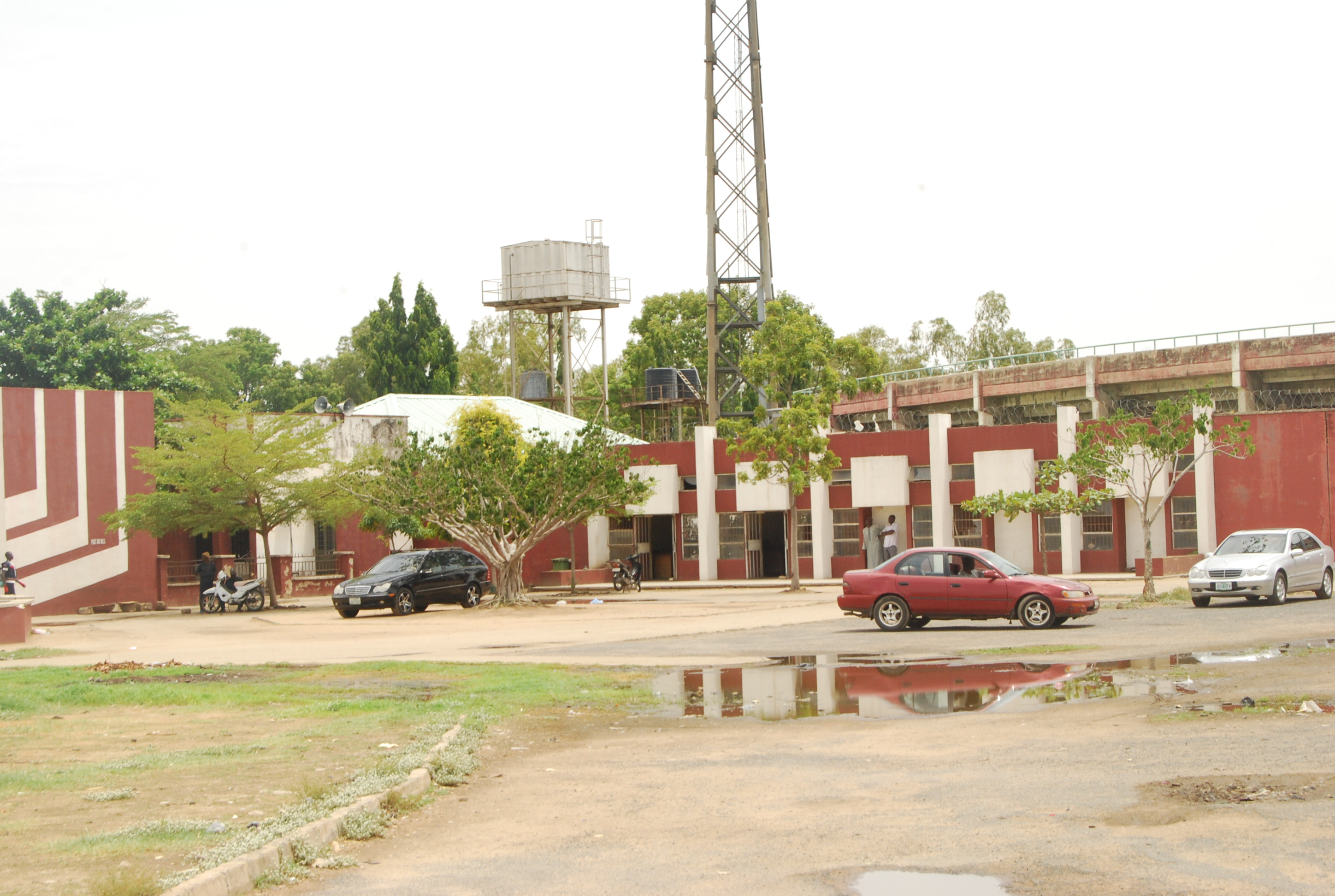
Abubakar Tafawa Balewa Stadium Bauchi Building

Distinguishing features of the stadium include a world-class FIFA standard scoreboard, LED display and energy saving floodlights, closed-circuit television (CCTV) for security surveillance, and an ultra-modern media centre. It also houses an Olympic-size 10-lane swimming pool.

== Notable matches ==
=== 1999 FIFA World Youth Championship ===
Date	Team 1	Result	Team 2	Attendance	Round
8 April 1999	Japan	3–1	United States	9,000	Group E
11 April 1999	Cameroon	1–3	United States	9,000	Group E
11 April 1999	Japan	2–0	England	9,000	Group E
15 April 1999	Japan	1–1 (a.e.t.) (5–4 p)	Portugal	8,000	Round of 16

=== 2009 FIFA U-17 World Cup ===
Date	Team 1	Result	Team 2	Attendance	Round
30 October 2009	Argentina	1–2	Nigeria	11,467	Group A
5 November 2009	Mexico	1–1 (a.e.t.) (3–5 p)	South Korea	11,589	Round of 16
8 November 2009	Colombia	1–1 (a.e.t.) (5–3 p)	Turkey	11,532	Quarter-final
