= Kun Khalifat FC =

Association football club in Imo State, Nigeria

- Full name: Kun Khalifat Football Club
- Nickname: The Pride of Imo State
- Founded: 2020; 6 years ago
- Ground: Dan Anyiam Stadium
- Capacity: 12,000
- Owner: Michael Amaefula
- Chairman: Rita Amaefula
- Technical adviser: Uzoho Obinna
- League: Nigeria Premier Football League
- 2025–26: 12th
Home colours	Away colours

Kun Khalifat Football Club is a professional association football club based in Owerri, Imo State, Nigeria. The team competes in the Nigeria Premier Football League, the first level of the Nigerian football league system since promoting from the Nigeria National League in 2025. They have played at Dan Anyiam Stadium since the beginning of 2025.

The club gained promotion to the Nigerian second division, Nigeria National League in 2024, after defeating De Sapele Lions FC in the second Nigeria Nationwide League One, NLO Playoff at Lekan Salami Stadium..

== History ==
Kun Khalifat FC was established in 2020 by Michael Amaefula. In their first season, they used Onwubike International Soccer Stadium, Ngor-Okpala, Imo State, as their home ground. However, since the beginning of 2025, they have been playing their home matches at Dan Anyiam Stadium.

They began league football in the Nigerian third division, Nigeria Nationwide League One. In 2021, they earned promotion to the second division, NNL. However, they didn't play in the NNL, as they traded their place with FC One Rocket, who were relegated from the NNL at the end of the 2021/22 season.

The club regained promotion to the NNL in 2024 — this time opting to play in the division.

== Home ground ==
Kun Khalifat FC currently uses the Dan Anyiam Stadium located in the city of Owerri in Imo State.

== Current squad ==
As of 2 March 2025

Note: Flags indicate national team as defined under FIFA eligibility rules; some limited exceptions apply. Players may hold more than one non-FIFA nationality.

No.	Pos.	Nation	Player
1	GK	NGA	Nsikak Akpan
2	DF	NGA	Mgbaemena Izunna
3	DF	NGA	Sunday Adehi
5	DF	NGA	Iwuorie Alukam
6	DF	NGA	Amaefula Chikamso
7	FW	NGA	Chinedu Sunday
8	FW	NGA	Daniel Nwandu
9	FW	NGA	Henry Ezeonye
10	FW	NGA	Akuta Ugochukwu
11	FW	NGA	Julius Jeremiah
12	MF	NGA	Ebuka Nwokorie
13	DF	NGA	Michael Akano
14	MF	NGA	Darlington Okoro

No.	Pos.	Nation	Player
15	DF	NGA	Umenya Chukwueze
16	GK	NGA	Chizoba Uwandu
17	DF	NGA	Victor Ikechukwu
18	GK	NGA	Chijioke Ekpemadu
19	MF	NGA	Chijioke Ahiaeke
20	FW	NGA	Kelechi Iroegbu
21	MF	NGA	Onyiriuka Ezinna
22	DF	NGA	Idongesit Effiong
24	DF	NGA	Prosper Okorocha
26	DF	NGA	Prosper Okorocha
27	MF	NGA	Onuorah Onyedika
28	FW	NGA	Odinaka Ahiaeke
32	GK	NGA	Obinna Akuche
33	FW	NGA	Joseph Ameh
34	FW	NGA	Peter Ikechukwu
