= El-Kanemi Stadium =

Coordinates: 11°50′46″N 13°08′45″E

El-Kanemi Stadium is a multi-use stadium in Maiduguri, Nigeria. It is currently used mostly for football matches and is the home stadium of El-Kanemi Warriors. The 10,000-seater stadium was named after the Kanem-Borno Empire ruler, Muhammad al-Amin al-Kanemi.
