= Barau F.C. =

Barau Football Club
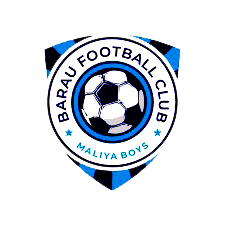
- Stadium: Dambatta Stadium
- Owner: Barau I. Jibrin
- President: Shawall Barau Jibrin
- General Manager: Dominic Iorfa
- Coach: Eugene Agagbe
- League: Nigeria Premier Football League
- 2025–26: 8th

Barau Football Club is a Nigerian Professional football club from Dambatta, Kano State that plays in the Nigeria Premier Football League (NPFL) for the 2025/2026 season. The club, based in Kano, is privately owned by Senator Barau I. Jibrin, the Deputy Senate President of Nigeria.

They were promoted to the NPFL for the first time in its history after finishing second in the 2025 Nigeria National League (NNL) Super 8 playoffs.

== History ==
=== Founding ===
The club was established by Senator Barau Jibrin The Deputy senate president of Nigeria. In June 2024 he told Premium Times that he formed the club to reduce unemployment among young people and “make it a global brand”. At that time the team was competing in Nigeria’s third tier and had won promotion to the Nigeria National League by defeating Yoca Crocodiles FC.

=== 8 November 2025 incident ===
During a NPFL match between Katsina United and Barau with the match being 1-0 to Katsina United, Orji Kalu scored the equalizer for Barau in the 69th minute and then the home fans of Katsina United started attacking the players after that, Barau's Nana Abraham was found laying down bleeding from his neck so it was concluded that Katsina United fans slit his throat during the attack.

== Rivalries ==
It's a rival to local Kano's Kano Pillars F.C.

== Stadium ==
Barau FC’s traditional home ground is the Dambatta Stadium in Kano.

== See more ==
- 2025-26 Nigeria Premier Football League
