= Muhammadu Dikko Stadium =

Stadium in Katsina, Nigeria

- Karkanda Stadium
- Interactive map of Muhammadu Dikko Stadium
- Full name: Muhammadu Dikko Stadium
- Location: Katsina, Katsina State, Nigeria
- Capacity: 35,000

Construction
- Opened: 2013
- Architect: Monimichelle Sports Facility Construction Ltd.

Tenant
- Katsina United

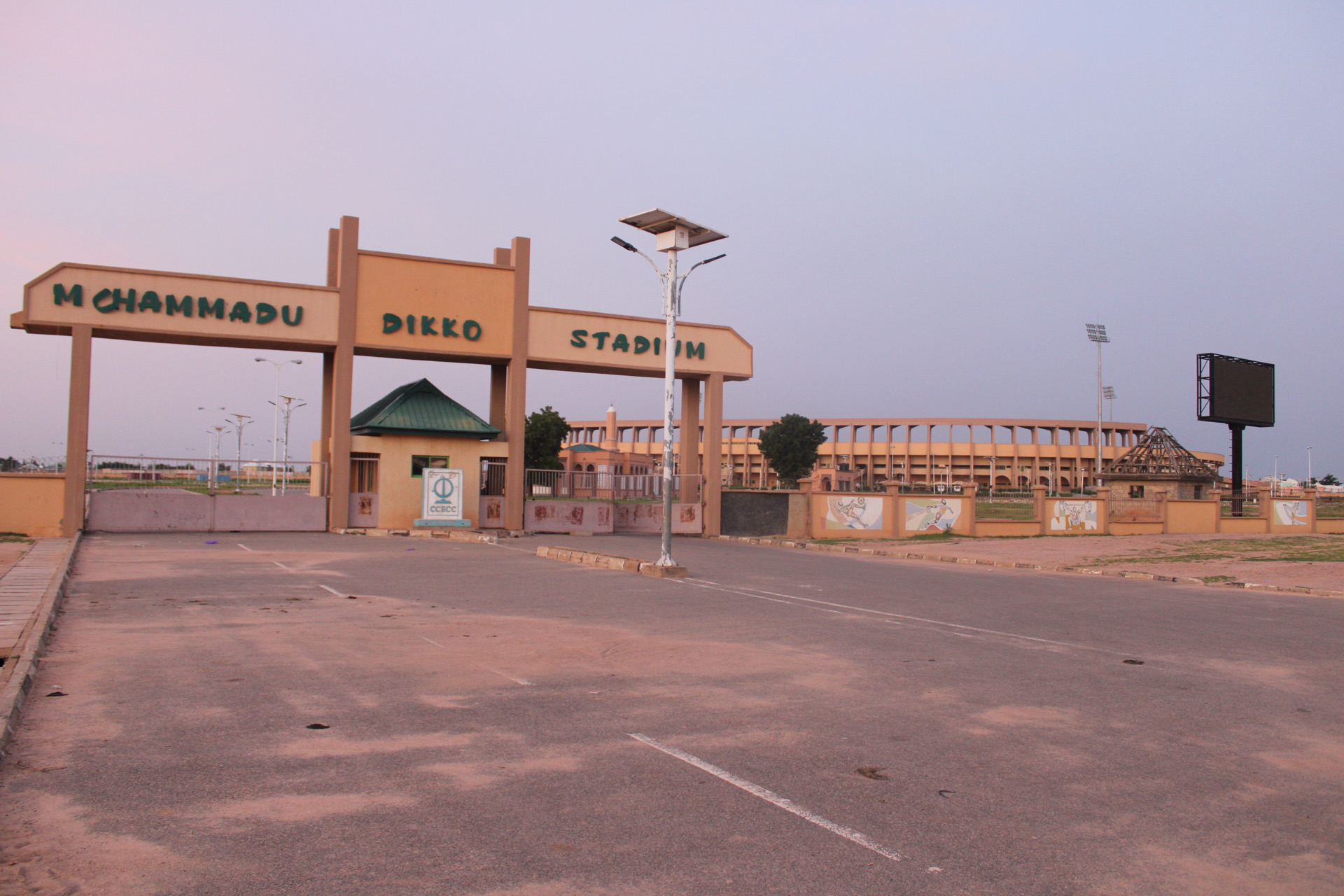
Entrance of the stadium

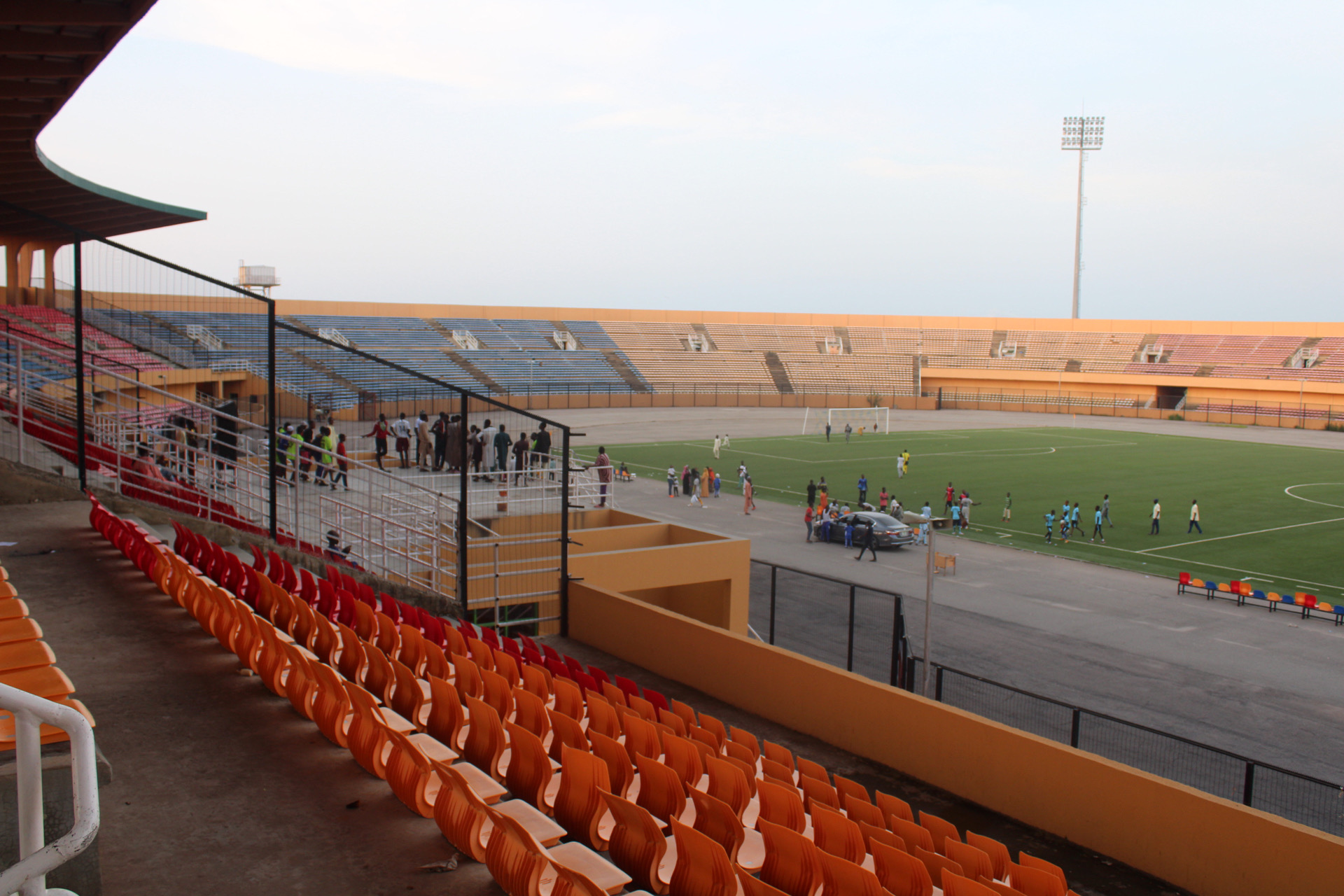
Pitch

The Muhammadu Dikko Stadium is an all-seater association football and athletics stadium in Katsina, Katsina State, Nigeria. The stadium is owned and maintained by the Katsina State Government. Construction started in the early 1990s, during the military Governorship of John Madaki, but was later abandoned. The project was resurrected and completed by Governor Ibrahim Shehu Shema, and was opened in 2013 as Karkanda Stadium. In 2016, it was renamed after Katsina's 20th-century Emir Muhammadu Dikko.

El-Kanemi Warriors F.C of Maiduguri played their home games at the stadium in 2015 and 2016 while the Boko Haram insurgency raged. It is currently home to the Katsina State-owned football club Katsina United.

A gymnasium and fitness club are also located within the stadium.
