= El-Kanemi Warriors F.C. =

Nigerian football club

- Full name: El Kanemi Warriors Football Club
- Nickname: Desert Warriors
- Founded: 1986; 40 years ago
- Ground: El-Kanemi Stadium, Maiduguri, Borno State, Nigeria
- Capacity: 10,000
- Chairman: Ibrahim Mainu Mustapha
- Manager: Kabir Dogo
- League: Nigeria Premier Football League
- 2025–26: 18th, Relegated

El-Kanemi Warriors Football Club is a professional football club based in Maiduguri, Borno State, Nigeria. Their playground is the El-Kanemi Stadium, Maiduguri. The club is on a positive rebound having gained promotion to the Nigeria Premier Football League in 2024 and doubling as the winners of the President Federation Cup in the same year.

== History ==
El-Kanemi Warriors ended the 2005 season in the lower half of the Nigeria Premier League and were relegated to the Nigeria Division 1 in 2007.

In 2012, the Warriors were promoted back to the top level. Due to the Boko Haram insurgency in 2014, they played their home games in Kano. From 2015 to 2016, they hosted their home games at the Muhammadu Dikko Stadium in Katsina before returning to Maiduguri and El-Kanemi Stadium.

In October 2017, the club announced former Enugu Rangers coach Imama Amapakabo as their new coach on a one-year deal.

In June 2024, El-Kanemi Warriors regained promotion to the Nigeria Premier Football League and later went on to win the Federation Cup after defeating Abia Warriors 2–0 at the Mobolaji Johnson Arena.

El-Kanemi Warriors finished 18th and got relegated at the end of the 2025–26 season at the last matchday after a poor run of form but shockingly won the Federation Cup that season with a 1–0 victory over Ikorodu City for the fourth time and their second in three seasons despite having been relegated.

== Achievements ==
- Nigerian FA Cup: 4

1991, 1992, 2024, 2026

- National Second Division: 2

1991, 2000

== Performance in CAF competitions ==
- CAF Cup Winners' Cup: 2 appearances

1992 – First Round
1993 – Semi-finals

- CAF Confederation Cup: 2 appearances

2024–25 – First Round
2026–27 – ? ?

== Current squad ==
As of 17 April 2019

Note: Flags indicate national team as defined under FIFA eligibility rules; some limited exceptions apply. Players may hold more than one non-FIFA nationality.

No.	Pos.	Nation	Player
30	GK	NGR	Itodo Akor
2	DF	NGR	Joe Maamo
3	DF	NGR	Adebesin Afeez
5	FW	NGR	Babatunde Solomon
6	DF	NGR	Lucky Erimuya
7	MF	NGR	Isiaka Olawale
8	MF	NGR	Sunday Anthony
12	FW	NGR	Ibrahim Mustapha
13	DF	NGR	Innocent Gabriel
14	MF	NGR	AbdulRazak Aliyu
16	FW	NGR	Anthony Yeful

No.	Pos.	Nation	Player
17	FW	NGR	Chinedu Ohanachom
19	FW	NGR	Analaba Uche
21	DF	NGR	Solomon onome
22	FW	NGR	Abdulwaheed Afolabi
23	MF	NGR	Kabiru Balogun
24	GK	NGR	Jobe Modou
26	FW	NGR	Abubakar Umar
28	DF	NGR	Osita Echendu
30	FW	NGR	Ocheme Edoh
33	MF	NGR	Tchoanfine Pade
39	FW	NGR	Ba'akaka Ajikolo
