= Wikki Tourists F.C. =

Nigerian football club

Wikki
- Full name: Wikki Tourists Football Club
- Nickname: Giant Elephant
- Short name: WTFC
- Founded: 1991; 35 years ago
- Ground: Abubarkar Tafawa Balewa Stadium; Bauchi
- Capacity: 15,000
- Chairman: Muhammad Auwal Gotal
- Manager: Abba Muhammed
- League: Nigeria Premier Football League
- 2025–26: 20th, Relegated
Home colours	Away colours

Wikki Tourists Football Club is a professional football club based in Bauchi, Nigeria, currently playing in the Nigeria Premier Football League. The main sponsor of the team is the Bauchi State Government. The club's home stadium is Abubakar Tafawa Balewa Stadium.

They returned to the Nigeria Premier Football League from the Nigeria National League in 2025.

== Achievements ==
- Nigerian FA Cup: 1

Winners - 1998

- Nigeria National League: 1

Winners - 2011

- Shehu Dukko Cup: 1

Winners - 2015

- State FA Cup: 13

Winners - 1998, 1999, 2003, 2004, 2006, 2007, 2008, 2011, 2012, 2015, 2016, 2017, 2019

== Performance in CAF competitions ==
- CAF Cup Winners' Cup: 1 appearance

1999 – Second Round

- CAF Confederation Cup: 2 appearances

2008 – First Round
2017 – First Round
