= Abia Warriors F.C. =

Nigerian football club

- Founded: 1993; 33 years ago
- Ground: Umuahia Township Stadium
- Capacity: 5,000
- Owner: Abia State Government
- Chairman: John Sam Obuh
- Manager: Imama Amapakabo
- League: Nigeria Premier Football League
- 2025–26: 7th
- Website: abiawarriorsfc.com
Home colours	Away colours

Abia Warriors Football Club is a Nigerian professional football club based in the city of Umuahia, Abia state. Originally playing as NEPA FC, the club adopted the name Ejoor Babes in 1994 in honour of a former military administrator of the State, Navy Captain Temi Ejoor. The Club morphed to Abia Warriors in 1996 with Basil Udwogu as Chairman.

Between 2005 and 2010, they played as "Orji Uzor Kalu FC" in honor of Abia governor Orji Uzor Kalu who helped the club with state sponsorship upon promotion to the professional level. They reverted to their old name in the summer of 2010.

They won promotion to the Nigeria Premier League for the first time in August 2013 after winning their division on the last day.

== Squad ==
Note: Flags indicate national team as defined under FIFA eligibility rules; some limited exceptions apply. Players may hold more than one non-FIFA nationality.

No.	Pos.	Nation	Player
1	GK	NGR	Edwin Nwakanma
3	DF	NGR	Ubong Williams
4	MF	NGR	Abdullahi Fatai
6	DF	CMR	Jean-Parfait Ledoux
7	MF	NGR	Promise Ogu
8	MF	NGR	Keumian Guy
9	FW	NGR	Jimoh Oni
10	FW	NGR	Shedrack Asiegbu
11	FW	NGR	Auta Phillip
12	FW	NGR	Atilola Abdulsalam Tunde
13	MF	NGR	Hammed Yakub
14	MF	NGR	Emmanuel Ugwuka

No.	Pos.	Nation	Player
15	MF	NGR	Adekunle Adeleke
20	FW	NGR	Paul Samson
23	FW	NGR	Odeh James
24	FW	NGR	Ikedinachi Nwakanma
25	MF	NGR	Somtochukwu Omini
26	DF	NGR	Ebetomame Oghenetega
29	DF	NGR	Innocent Gabriel
30	GK	NGR	Tambe Charles
34	MF	NGR	Okemmiri Anthony
35	GK	NGR	Godgift Elkanah

== Notable players ==
- (Benin) Raimi Kola (2015–2017)
