= Katsina United F.C. =

Nigerian football club

Katsina United
- Full name: Katsina United Football Club
- Nickname: The Changi Boys
- Founded: 1994; 32 years ago
- Ground: Muhammadu Dikko Stadium; Katsina
- Capacity: 35,000
- Chairman: Prince Abdulssamad Badamasi
- Manager: Henry Makinwa
- League: Nigeria Professional Football League
- 2025–26: Nigeria Professional Football League, 9th of 20
Home colours	Away colours

Katsina United Football Club is a Nigerian football club based in the town of Katsina, Katsina State.

== History ==
Founded in 1994, they were promoted to the Nigerian Premier League in 1997, placing 12th in their debut season but were disbanded after relegation in 2001. The Katsina State Government began plans to resurrect the team in April 2008. The club was reestablished in 2009 and was renamed "Spotlights FC". They debuted in the Nigeria National League for their first year. In February 2016, the team reverted to their original name, Katsina United. In October 2016, Katsina United won promotion back to the Nigeria Professional Football League, returning 15 years after they were last relegated.

=== Stadium ===
They played the first half of their first season after re-establishment at the Sardauna Memorial Stadium in Gusau while Katsina Township Stadium was being renovated. The club later moved to the new all-seater 35,000 capacity Muhammadu Dikko Stadium in Katsina.

== Achievements ==
- Nigerian FA Cup: 0
  - Runners-up: 1995, 1996, 1997
- Nigeria National League: 1
  - Champions: 2016

== Performances in CAF competitions ==
- African Cup Winners' Cup: 1 appearance

1996 – Quarter-Finals

- CAF Cup: 1 appearance

2001 – Withdrew Second round

== Team ==
As of 30 December 2020

The current technical adviser of Katsina United is Azeez Muhammed Audu, Bishir Sadauki is the coach, Babangida Auwal Jayi is the assistant coach, goal keeper trainer is Ahmed Jibrin.

Note: Flags indicate national team as defined under FIFA eligibility rules; some limited exceptions apply. Players may hold more than one non-FIFA nationality.

No.	Pos.	Nation	Player
1	GK	NGA	Yusuf Muhammed
2		NGA	Adamu Tukur
3	DF	NGA	Adebesin Afeez Olamilekan
4		NGA	Eleje Onyedikachi
5		NGA	sulaiman yusuf
6		NGA	Souley Muhamad
8		NGA	Suleman Ibrahim
9	FW	NGA	Gambo Muhammad
10		NGA	Abdulkarim Ahmed
14		NGA	Kabir Jinadu
15	FW	NGA	Odebiyi Olamilekan

No.	Pos.	Nation	Player
16	FW	NGA	Aondoakaa Enoch
17	MF	NGA	Kehinde Emmanuel
19	MF	NGA	Iliasu Sulaimon Ojochenemi
20	MF	NGA	Azeez Falolu
21	MF	NGA	Ajiboye Temitayo
22	FW	NGA	Badmus Leoh Makanjuola
23	FW	NGA	Uwadiogbu Preston Ifeanyi
24	FW	NGA	Akinwale Alaba
31	MF	NGA	Dauda Samson Oluwaseun
33	GK	NGA	
40	DF	NGA	Smart Ehiebolo okosun

As of May 2026
Pos.	Nation	Player	Jersey No.
GK	NGN	Abdullahi Zalli	1
GK	NGN	Umar Yusuf	40
GK	NGN	Hamisu Sa'idu	13
GK	NGN	Abdallah Sulaiman	21
RB	NGN	Innocent Arigu	12
RB	NGN	Adamu Tukur	32
RB	NGN	Sunusi Sani	34
RB	NGN	Haruna Attah	3
LB	NGN	Ismail Muhammad	33
LB	NGN	Philph Ogoche	22
LB	NGN	Faisal Sani	31
CB	NGN	Ahmad Kabir Yallilo	2
CB	NGN	Ejike Ezoechi	25
CB	NGN	Mannase Yusuf	5
CB	NGN	Moses Adikwu	15
CB	NGN	Sulaiman Yusuf	28
CB	NGN	Ahmad Nasir	38
DM	NGN	Usman Barau	4
DM	NGN	Richard Christopher	6
DM	NGN	Nafiu Ibrahim	24
DM	NGN	Kabir M. Kabir	36
CM	NGN	Zahraddeen Abubakar	42
CM	NGN	Akanni Elijah	14
CM	NGN	Mubarak Sani	18
CM	NGN	Abubakar Abdullahi	20
CM	NGN	Abdulkarim Ahmed	10
AM	NGN	Azeez Falolu	8
AM	NGN	Nazir Yunusa	44
AM	NGN	Armaya'u Armaya'u	-
WA	NGN	Muhammad Ibrahim	16
WA	NGN	Auwal Sadiq A.	27
WA	NGN	Abdulrahman Garba	35
WA	SNG	Boubakar Massale	19
WA	NGN	Jamilu Yusuf	39
WA	NGN	Aliyu Musa	41
WA	NGN	Abdulkadir Dali	11
WA	NGN	Abubakar Hassan	37
CF	NGN	Nura Haruna	7
CF	NGN	Uche Colins	9
CF	NGN	Agara Daniel	29
CF	NGN	Sadiq Abubakar Usman	26
CF	NGN	Abubakar Isiyaku	29
RB	NGN	Muhammad Mubi Muhammad	-
