= Ikorodu City F.C. =

Nigerian football club

Ikorodu City
- Full name: Ikorodu City Football Club
- Nickname: Oga Boys
- Founded: January 2022; 4 years ago
- Ground: Onikan Stadium
- Capacity: 10,000
- President: Sanmi Doherty
- Manager: Ali Kandil
- League: Nigeria Premier Football League
- 2024–25: 4th
- Website: https://www.ikoroducityfc.com

Ikorodu City Football Club is a football club based in Ikorodu, Lagos that plays in the Nigeria Premier Football League. They were promoted to the elite league in 2024 after three seasons in the lower divisions.

== History ==
Ikorodu City was founded in January 2022 and competed in the Nigeria National League for three seasons. The club got promoted to the NPFL after qualifying from the play-off rounds of the NNL in 2024. The club has partnered with gaming platform BetKing.

== Stadium ==
Ikorodu City play home games at the Onikan Stadium with 10,000 capacity, also utilised by most football clubs in Lagos.

== Academy ==
The club also has a football academy.

== 2026/2027 EUROMATCH NPFL LEAGUE SEASON ==
Ikorodu City recorded a crucial away win against Enyimba FC on Match day 13 of the Euromatch NPFL with Tomison Adebayo scoring the lone goal that gave them victory over Enyimba FC.

Ikorodu City are currently 8th on the Euromatch NPFL Log

== Current squad ==
Note: Flags indicate national team as defined under FIFA eligibility rules; some limited exceptions apply. Players may hold more than one non-FIFA nationality.

| No. | Pos. | Nation | Player |
|---|---|---|---|
| 31 | GK | NGR | Adam Ogunmola |
| 5 | FW | NGR | Charles Ajayi |
| 9 | FW | NGR | Babatunde Omotayo |
| 10 | DF | NGR | Chiemerie Anozie |
| 13 | DF | NGR | Kunle Abiola |
| 15 | MF | NGR | Justin Olaniyan |
| 19 | GK | NGR | Vernon Adebisi |

| No. | Pos. | Nation | Player |
|---|---|---|---|
| 18 | DF | NGR | Olufemi Akintola |
| 30 | MF | NGR | Friday Alabi |
| 33 | DF | NGR | Ryan Abidemi |
| 35 | DF | NGR | Winston Olatunji |
| 36 | MF | NGR | Christus Adeola |
| 40 | DF | NGR | Terrence Adeyemi |
