= Kail (surname) =

Kail is a surname. Notable people with the surname include:

- Edgar Kail (1900–1976), English footballer
- Eva Kail (born 1959), Austrian urban planner
- Hans Kail (fl. 1920s), Austrian ice hockey player
- Josh Kail (born 1986), American politician
- Kail Piho (born 1991), Estonian Nordic combined skier
- Khalid Kail (born 1996), Pakistani-born cricketer
- Mary Elizabeth Kail (1828–1890), American poet
- Riaz Kail (born 1988), Pakistani cricketer
- Thomas Kail (born 1978), American theatre director
- Thomas K. Moore (born 1938), American judge

== See also ==
- Kail (disambiguation)
- Kale (name)
- Kali (name)
