= Kali (name) =

Kali is an Indian given name and surname of Sanskrit origins from the name Kālá. Notable people with this name include the following:

== Mononym ==
- Kali, Hindu goddess, destroyer of evil forces
- Kali (Bulgarian singer), professional name of Galina Dimitrova Ivanova (born 1975), Bulgarian singer
- Kali (demon), Hindu mortal demon, source of all evil
- Kali (footballer), nickname of Carlos Manuel Gonçalves Alonso, (born 1978), Angolan former footballer
- Kali (painter), nickname of Hanna Weynerowska (1918–1998), Polish painter
- Kali (French singer), stage name of Jean-Marc Monnerville (born 1959), French musician

== Nicknames ==
- Kali, stage name of Kalila Ali Ross, American rapper
- Kali Meehan, nickname of Kalivati Gerald Meehan (born 1970), New Zealand-born boxer
- Kali Mirza, stage name of Kalidas Chattopadhyay, Indian composer
- Kali Mountford, nickname of Carol Jean Mountford (born 1954), British politician
- Kali Muscle, stage name of Chuck Kirkendall (born 1975), American bodybuilder, model and actor
- Kali Mutsa, stage name of Celine Reymond, Chilean singer and the name of her band
- Kali N. Rathnam, stage name of Narayana Padaiyatchi Rathnam, (c. 1897 – 1950), Indian actor
- Kali Uchis, professional name of Karly-Marina Loaiza (born 1994), American singer and songwriter

== Given name ==
- Kali Arulpragasam, English jewelry designer and artist (also sister of musician M.I.A.)
- Kali Charan Bahl, Indian professor of languages and linguistics
- Kali Banerjee (1921–1993), Indian film actor
- Kali Charan Banerjee (1847–1902), Indian Christian
- Kali S. Banerjee (1914–2002), Bangladeshi statistics professor
- Kali Prasad Baskota (born 1979) Nepali singer, musician and lyricist
- Kali Christ (born 1991), Canadian speed skater
- Kali Davis-White (born 1994), American sprint athlete
- Kali Ranjan Deb, Indian politician
- Kali Flanagan (born 1995), American ice hockey player
- Kali Nicole Gross (born 1972), American historian
- Kali Gwegwe (born 1969), Nigerian football executive
- Kali Hawk (born 1986), American actress, comedian and model
- Kali Charan Hembram (born 1960), Indian writer
- Kali Bahadur Malla, Nepalese politician
- Kali Malone (born 1994), American composer and organist
- Kali Nikitas (born 1964), American graphic designer
- Kali Ongala (born 1979), English football player
- Kalicharan Prasad (born 1967), Indian politician
- Kali Reis (born 1986), American boxer
- Kali Rocha (born 1971), American actress
- Kali Nath Roy (1878–1945), Indian journalist and editor
- Kali Charan Saraf, Indian politician
- Kali Spitzer (born 1987), Canadian indigenous photographer
- Kali Charan Suman (born 1964), Indian politician
- Kali VanBaale (born 1975), American novelist

== Middle name ==
- Rognvald Kali Kolsson (c. 1103 – 1158), Norwegian saint
- Shar-Kali-Sharri (fl. c. 2217–2193 BC), Akkadian Empire king

== Surname ==
- Anouar Kali (born 1991), Moroccan football player
- Cyril Kali (born 1984), French footballer
- Kelley Kali, American director and producer
- Maitreya Kali and Satya Sai Maitreya Kali, stagename of Craig Vincent Smith (1945–2012), American musician, songwriter and actor
- Sándor Káli (born 1951), Hungarian politician
- Shanti Kali (died 2000), Indian Hindu priest
- Sinbad Kali (born 1987), Australian rugby footballer
- Tamar-kali, American singer-songwriter
- Wavala Kali (born 1954), Papua New Guinean sprint athlete

== See also ==
- Kali (disambiguation)
- Kai (name)
- Kail (disambiguation)
- Kaji (surname)
- Kala (name)
- Kale (name)
- Kalin (surname)
- Kalis (surname)
- Kalk (surname)
- Kalli (name)
- Kari (name)
- Karli (name)
- Kazi (given name)
- Koli (surname)
