= Kaiji =

Kaiji may refer to:

== People ==
- Kaiji Kawaguchi (川口 開治; born 1948), Japanese manga artist whose works include Eagle and Zipang
- Kaiji Soze (曽世 海司), Japanese voice actor; see List of Ultraman manga characters
- Kaiji Tang, (born 1984) an American voice actor
- Kaiji Tsukamoto (塚本 快示; 1912-1990), Japanese ceramist of the Showa era; see Celadon

== Characters ==
- Kaiji Itō (伊藤 開司), a character from the manga and anime series Kaiji
- Kaiji Ganto (巌徒 海慈), a character also known as Damon Gant from the video game series Ace Attorney

== Other uses ==
- Kaiji (train), a train service in Japan
- Kaiji (manga), a Japanese manga and anime series

== See also ==
- Kaji (disambiguation)
