= Nikitas (disambiguation) =

Nikitas may refer to:

== Places ==
- Nikitas, village in Cyprus

== Given name ==
- Nikitas Kaklamanis (born 1946), Greek politician
- Nikitas Kocheilas (born 1983), Greek water polo player
- Nikitas Loulias (born 1955), American bishop
- Nikitas Platis (1912–1984), Greek actor
- Nikitas Venizelos (born 1930), Greek shipping magnate and politician

== Surname ==
- Derek Nikitas, American author
- Kali Nikitas (born 1964), American graphic designer
- Solon Nikitas (1937–2005), Cypriot judge

== See also ==
- Nikita (disambiguation)
