= Kale (name) =

Origin
- Meaning: Affectionate, calm, fair, ocean, pure, sea, slender, tide; black (in Marathi)

Other names
- Alternative spelling: Kayle, Kail, Cale kaleb, כאלב
- Variant forms: Kaden, Kai, Kalene, Kaley, Kalyn
- Related names: Kaile, Kalea, Kaleah, Kalee, Kalei, Kaleia, Kayla, Kaleya

Kale, sometimes spelt as Kayle or abbreviated from Kalen, is a Gaelic unisex given name, although it is more commonly given to males.

== History ==
Americanized form of German Köhl (see Kohl) or Kehl and possibly also of Kahl (compare Cale). In English it is a habitational name from the villages of East and West Keal in Lincolnshire which are named from Old Norse kjǫlr ‘ridge’.

It may also be a variant of Call. In Dutch it is a nickname from kaal ‘bald’.

In India (Maharashtra it is a descriptive nickname from Hindi kale ‘black’ (Sanskrit kāla) found among Marathas or/and Kunbis, Brahmnins and other communities. The Konkanastha Brahmins have a clan called Kale.

== People ==
=== Given name ===
- Kale Ane, former professional American football player
- Kale Browne, actor
- Kale Cezario, Ghanaian politician
- Kale Kayihura, Ugandan lawyer, military officer and policeman
- Kale Kye-Taung Nyo, king of Ava from 1425 to 1426
- Kale Williams, American civil rights activist

=== Surname ===
- Aderonke Kale, major-general and former commander of the Nigerian Army Medical Corps
- Jonathan Kale (born 1988), Ivorian basketball player
- Karsh Kale, musician
- Tvrtko Kale (born 1974), Croatian-Israeli footballer
- Vasant Purushottam Kale, Marathi Writer
- Mahesh Kale, Marathi Singer

== Fictional characters ==
- Kale (Dragon Ball), a character from Dragon Ball Super
- Kale (Lady Kale), villain in the cartoon series Princess Gwenevere and the Jewel Riders
- Kale, a character from the film A Perfect Getaway
- Jennifer Kale, a Marvel Comics character
- Kale Brecht, main character of the film Disturbia
- Kale Firehart, main character of book series The Chronicles of Kale
- Kale Ingram, a character in the TV series Rubicon

== See also ==
- Kale (disambiguation)
- Kali (name)
- Kalle, given name
