= Dombraye =

Dombraye is a surname. Notable people with the surname include:

- Eddy Lord Dombraye (born 1979), Nigerian footballer and manager
- Jossy Dombraye, Nigerian footballer and manager
