= Kaji (surname) =

Kaji (written: 加治) is a Japanese surname. Notable persons with that name include:

- Akira Kaji (born 1980), Japanese footballer
- Haruka Kaji (加治 遥, born 1994), Japanese tennis player
- Maki Kaji (1951–2021), Japanese businessman
- Manon Kaji (born 2004), Japanese snowboarder
- Masaki Kaji (born 1988), Japanese actor and singer
- Meiko Kaji (born 1947), Japanese actress and singer
- Ryan Kaji, American child YouTuber
- Ryuichi Kaji (1896–1978), Japanese journalist and political critic
- Shungo Kaji (born 1961), Japanese film director, screenwriter, producer and company executive
- Wataru Kaji (1903–1982), Japanese writer
- Yūki Kaji (born 1985), Japanese voice actor

== See also ==
- Kaji (disambiguation)
- Kaja (name)
- Kali (name)
