= Kaji =

Kaji may refer to:

- Kaji (surname), a Japanese surname
- Kaji (poet), an 18th-century Japanese poet
- Kaji (Nepal), a title and position used by Nepalese nobility during the Shah rule of Nepal
- Kaji Station, a railway station in Shibata, Niigata, Japan
- KAJI-LP, a defunct low-power radio station (95.3 FM) formerly licensed to serve Palm Desert, California, United States

== See also ==
- Kaiji (disambiguation)
- Kasi (disambiguation)
- Kazi (disambiguation)
