= Bayelsa United F.C. =

Nigerian football club

Bayelsa United
- Full name: Bayelsa United Football Club
- Founded: 2000; 26 years ago
- Ground: Yenagoa Township Stadium; Yenagoa, Nigeria
- Capacity: 5,000
- Chairman: Dr. Tarilaye Nwankwe
- Manager: Coach Monday Odigie
- League: Nigeria Professional Football League
- 2025–26: 19th, Relegated
Home colours	Away colours

Bayelsa United FC is a football club based in Yenagoa, Bayelsa, Nigeria. They play in the Premier division of Nigerian football, the Nigeria Professional Football League. Their home games are played at the Samson Siasia Stadium, Ovom, Yenagoa, Bayelsa State. The current coach of the team is Monday odigie, who has previously coached the team.

== 2008/09 season ==
Due to torrential rains making the pitch unplayable, they played the 2007–2008 season in the Delta State town of Oghara. During the 2008–09 season, Bayelsa was forced to play three home games in Ibadan after crowd trouble in their derby with Ocean Boys. Then at the new year's break the team was suspended from continuing their league schedule despite being at the top of the table. This was due to outstanding debts and salaries. In a surprising move, the team sacked technical adviser Miekeme Fekete right as the squad was traveling to Brazzaville to play in the CAF Confederation Cup. They won the Nigerian Premier League for the first time after a 2–2 draw at Warri Wolves F.C. on June 14, qualifying them for the 2010 CAF Champions League. The celebration was dampened however when captain Abel Tador was killed by robbers hours after the game.

== 2009/10 season ==
In January 2010, the Bayelsa State government said they were looking for private sponsorship to take over the team. They were relegated at the end of the season by one point after losing three of their last four games and being banished to play home games in Kano. They protested the relegation, claiming three points should have been awarded from an abandoned game in Bauchi when home team Wikki Tourists left the pitch. After months of court action (and the temporary expansion of the league to 24 teams), their relegation was confirmed in September 2010.

== 2011 season ==
Financial problems plagued Bayelsa's return to the second division. They let many players leave on free transfers at the start of the season due to non-payment of salaries. In May 2011, they boycotted their state FA cup final and had a protest at the Bayelsa State government building because of non-payment, in some cases going back two years to their league title. At the time, they were at the top of the table in the National League Division 1-B.

== 2012 season ==
They won their nine-team division to win promotion back to the Premier League and placed second to rivals Nembe City F.C. in the Nigerian National League Super Four tournament. They were relegated after a last place finish in 2015.

== Achievements ==
- Nigerian Premier League: 1

2009.

- Nigeria FA Cup: 1

2021.

- Nigerian Super Cup: 1

2009.

== Performance in CAF competitions ==
- CAF Confederation Cup: 1 appearance

2009 – Semi-Finals

- CAF Champions League: 1 appearance

2010 – Preliminary Round

== Former head coaches ==
- (Nigeria) Alphonsus Dike
- (Nigeria) Jossy Dombraye
- (Nigeria) Ladan Bosso
- (Nigeria) Richard Bubagha

== Former chairmen ==
- (Nigeria) Kali Gwegwe
- (Nigeria) Henry Nwosu
