= Abel Tador =

Nigerian footballer

Abiel Tabor
Personal information
- Date of birth: 28 October 1984
- Place of birth: Warri, Nigeria
- Date of death: 14 June 2009 (aged 24)
- Place of death: Niger Delta, Nigeria
- Position: Defensive midfielder

Senior career*
Years	Team	Apps	(Gls)
2004–2005	NPA		
2006–2007	Sharks		
2008–2009	Bayelsa United		
- * Club domestic league appearances and goals

Abel Tador (28 October 1984 – 14 June 2009) was a Nigerian professional footballer.

== Career ==
Tador was captain of club side Bayelsa United, and led his side to the 2008–09 Nigerian Premier League. He formerly played for NPA and Sharks.

== Death ==
However, just hours after his side won the championship, Tador was shot dead by armed robbers in the Niger Delta.
