= Snowboarding at the 2020 Winter Youth Olympics – Girls' halfpipe =

Girls' halfpipe at the III Winter Youth Olympic Games
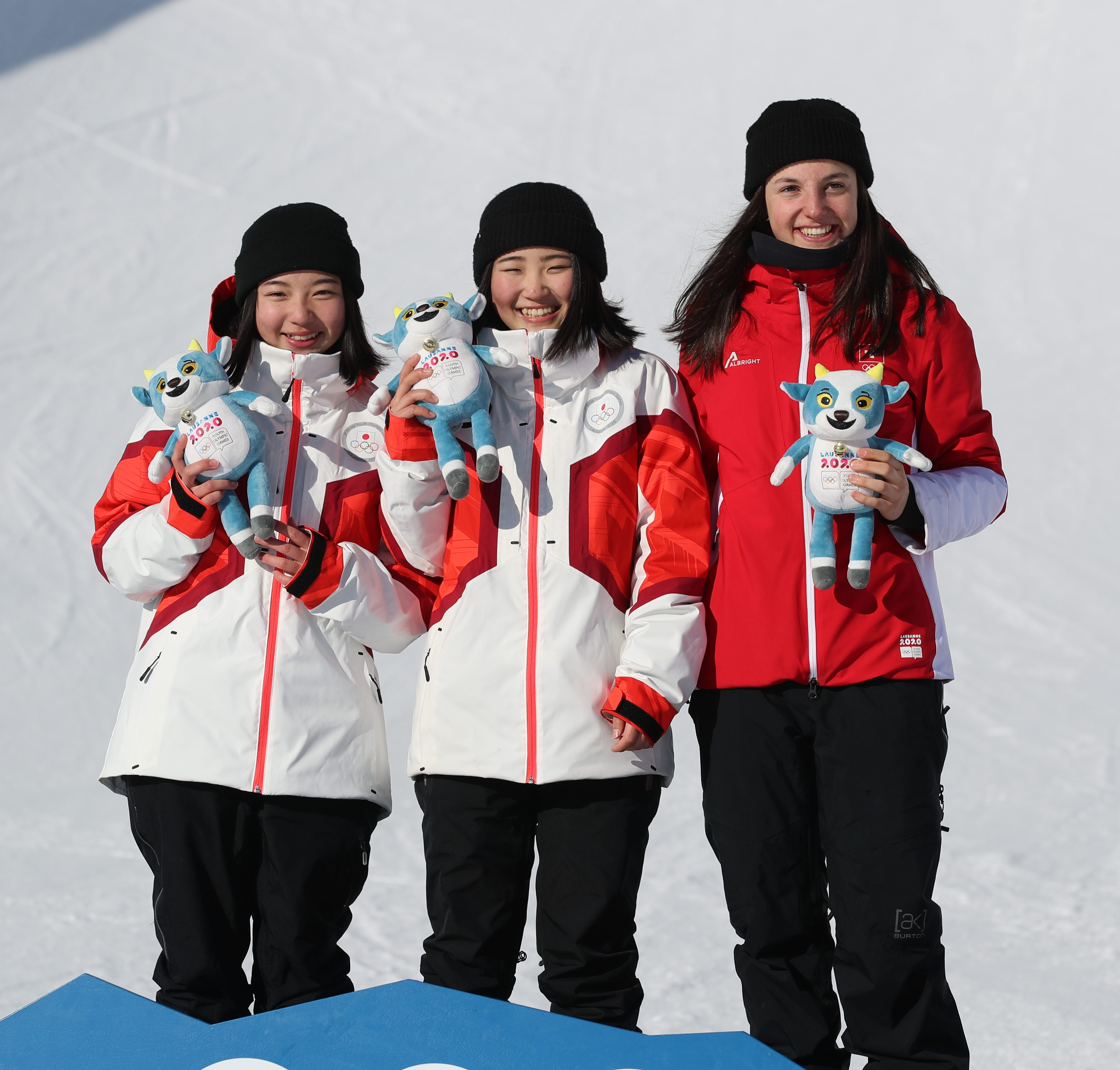
- Venue: Leysin Park & Pipe
- Dates: 20 January
- Competitors: 14 from 8 nations
- Winning points: 95.33

Medalists
1st place, gold medalist(s)		Mitsuki Ono	Japan
2nd place, silver medalist(s)		Manon Kaji	Japan
3rd place, bronze medalist(s)		Berenice Wicki	Switzerland

The girls' halfpipe event in snowboarding at the 2020 Winter Youth Olympics took place on 20 January at the Leysin Park & Pipe.

== Qualification ==
The qualification started at 09:30.

Rank	Bib	Name	Country	Run 1	Run 2	Best	Notes
1	9	Mitsuki Ono	Japan	89.33	85.66	89.33	Q
2	8	Manon Kaji	Japan	87.00	42.33	87.00	Q
3	5	Berenice Wicki	Switzerland	77.33	84.00	84.00	Q
4	6	Tessa Maud	United States	82.00	12.33	82.00	Q
5	4	Wang Jianjie	China	72.33	65.00	72.33	Q
6	11	Jia Yanru	China	51.66	62.66	62.66	Q
7	2	Isabelle Lötscher	Switzerland	58.66	40.33	58.66	Q
8	13	Lee Na-yoon	South Korea	48.33	36.00	48.33	Q
9	7	Kamilla Kozuback	Canada	44.00	44.33	44.33	
10	12	Athena Comeau	United States	42.66	37.00	42.66	
11	3	Lily Jekel	Australia	39.33	39.66	39.66	
12	1	María Chávez	Argentina	33.66	15.00	33.66	
13	10	Alexandra Chen	Australia	31.00	24.33	31.00	
14	14	Kianah Hyatt	Canada	24.33	24.33	24.33	

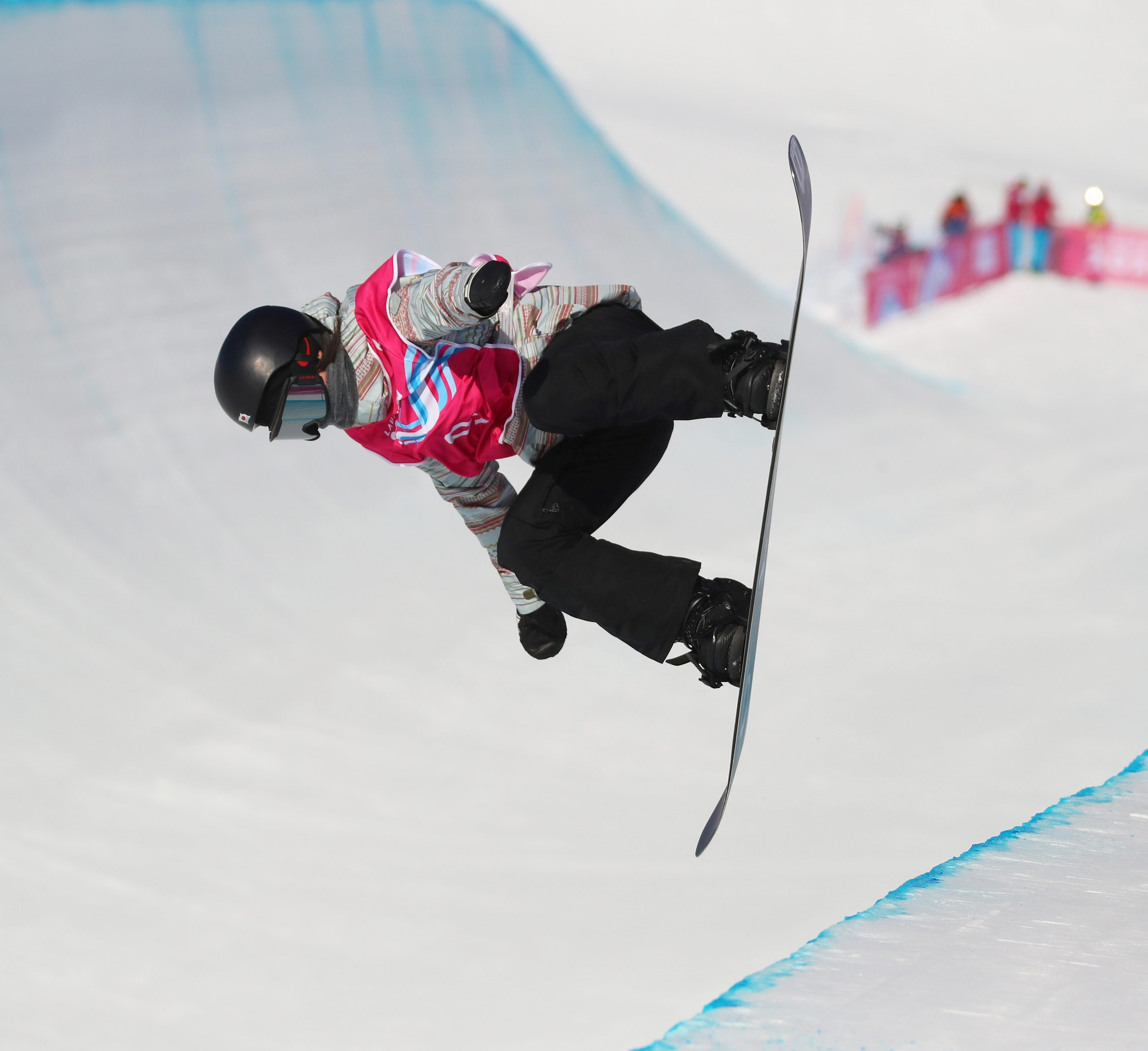
Mitsuki Ono

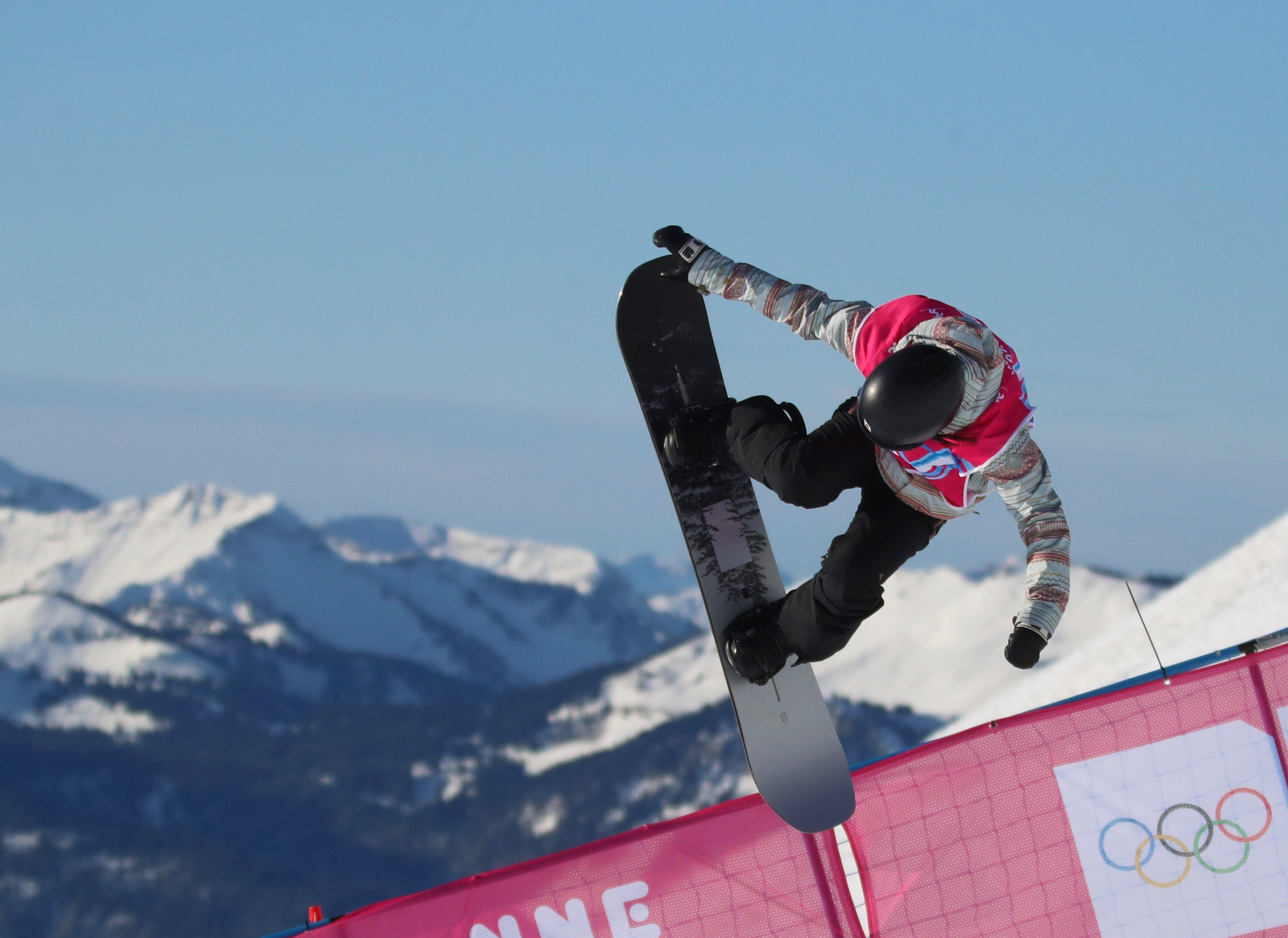
Manon Kaji

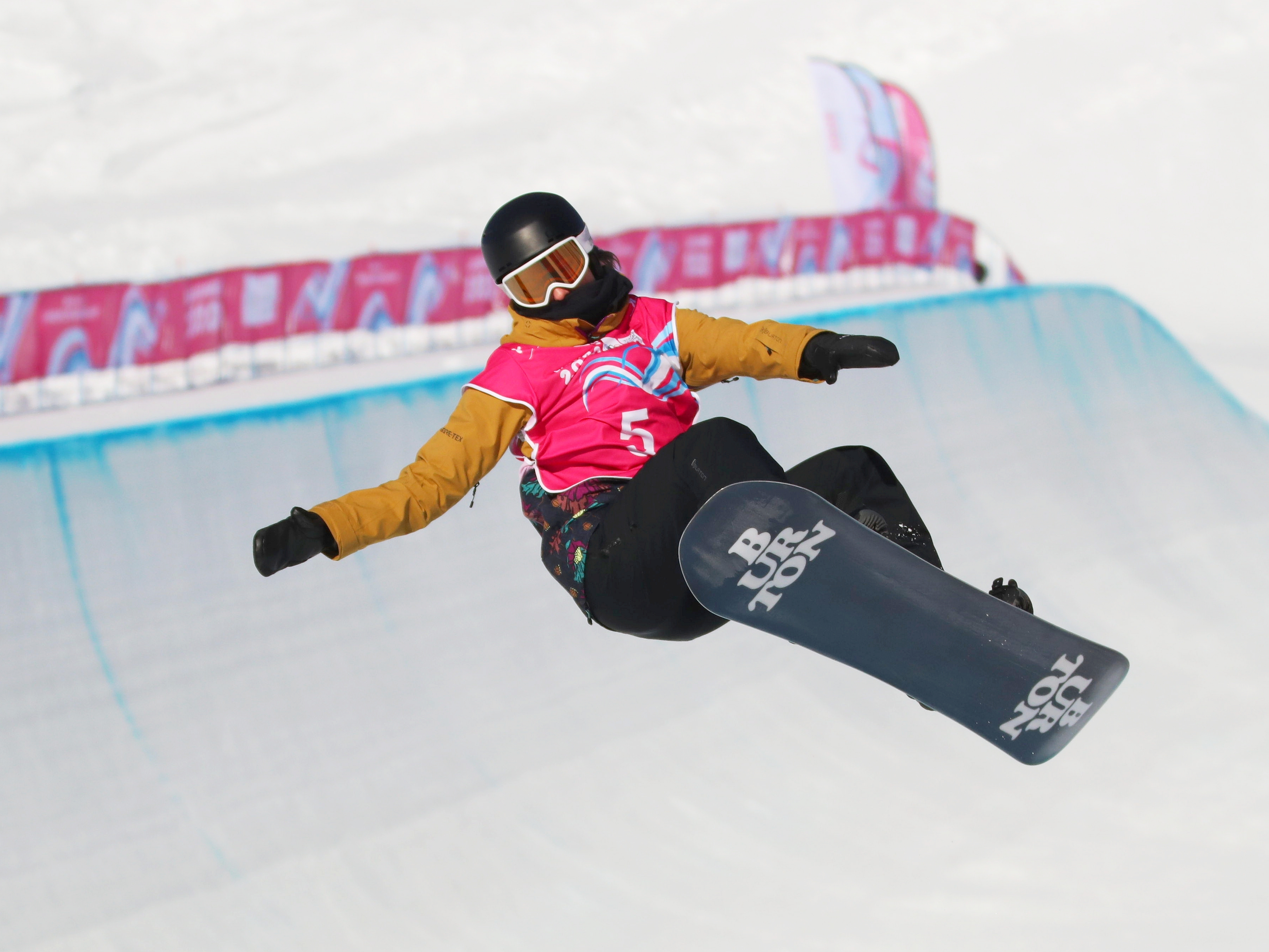
Berenice Wicki

== Final ==
The final started at 11:10.

Rank	Start order	Bib	Name	Country	Run 1	Run 2	Run 3	Best
1st place, gold medalist(s)	7	8	Mitsuki Ono	Japan	91.33	88.33	95.33	95.33
2nd place, silver medalist(s)	8	9	Manon Kaji	Japan	85.33	41.00	31.66	85.33
3rd place, bronze medalist(s)	6	5	Berenice Wicki	Switzerland	81.33	45.66	38.00	81.33
4	5	6	Tessa Maud	United States	76.00	76.00	18.66	76.00
5	4	4	Wang Jianjie	China	66.66	73.00	72.00	73.00
6	2	2	Isabelle Lötscher	Switzerland	55.00	57.00	63.00	63.00
7	1	13	Lee Na-yoon	South Korea	33.66	36.66	39.66	39.66
8	3	11	Jia Yanru	China	12.00	10.00	15.00	15.00

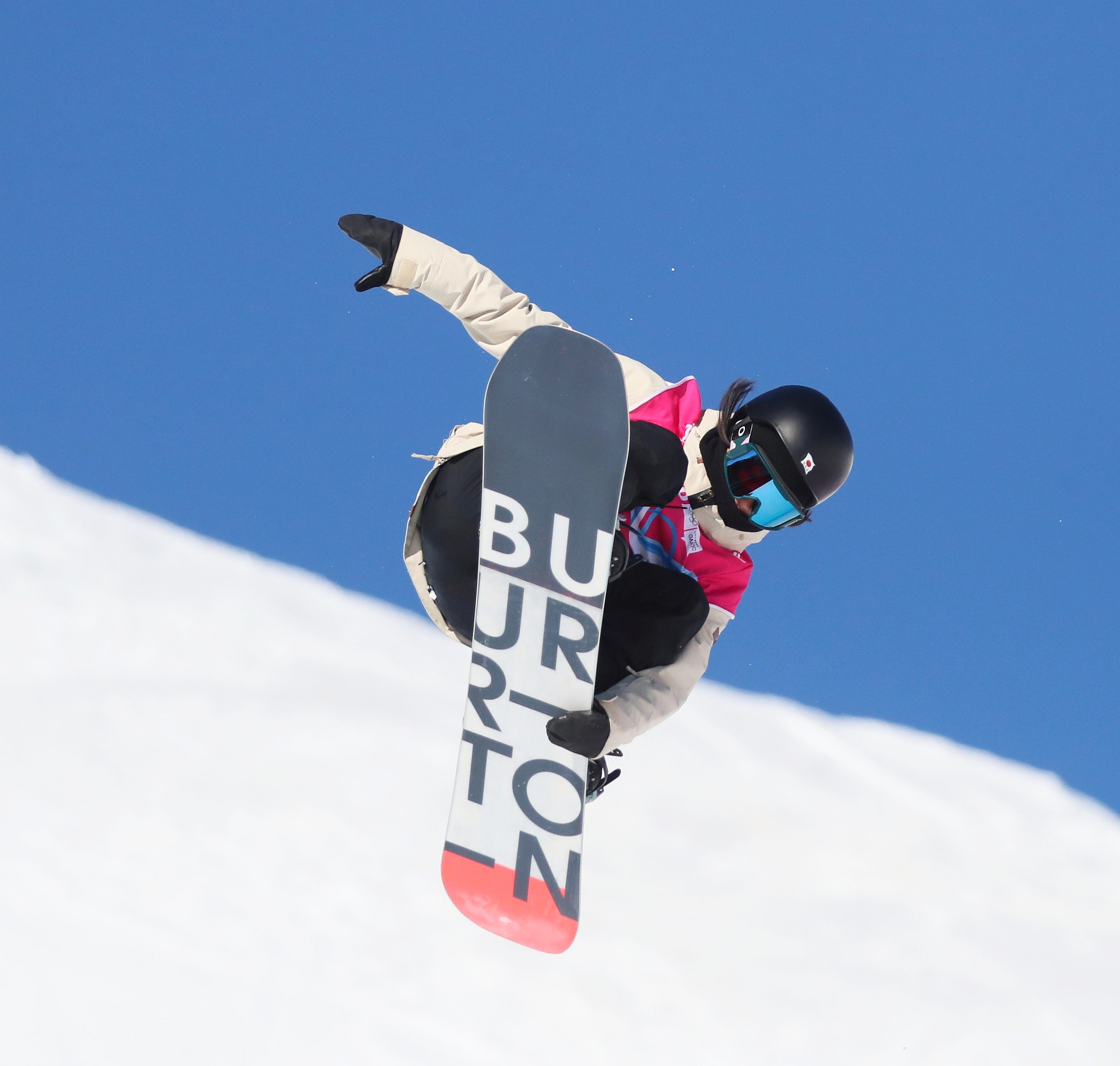
Mitsuki Ono

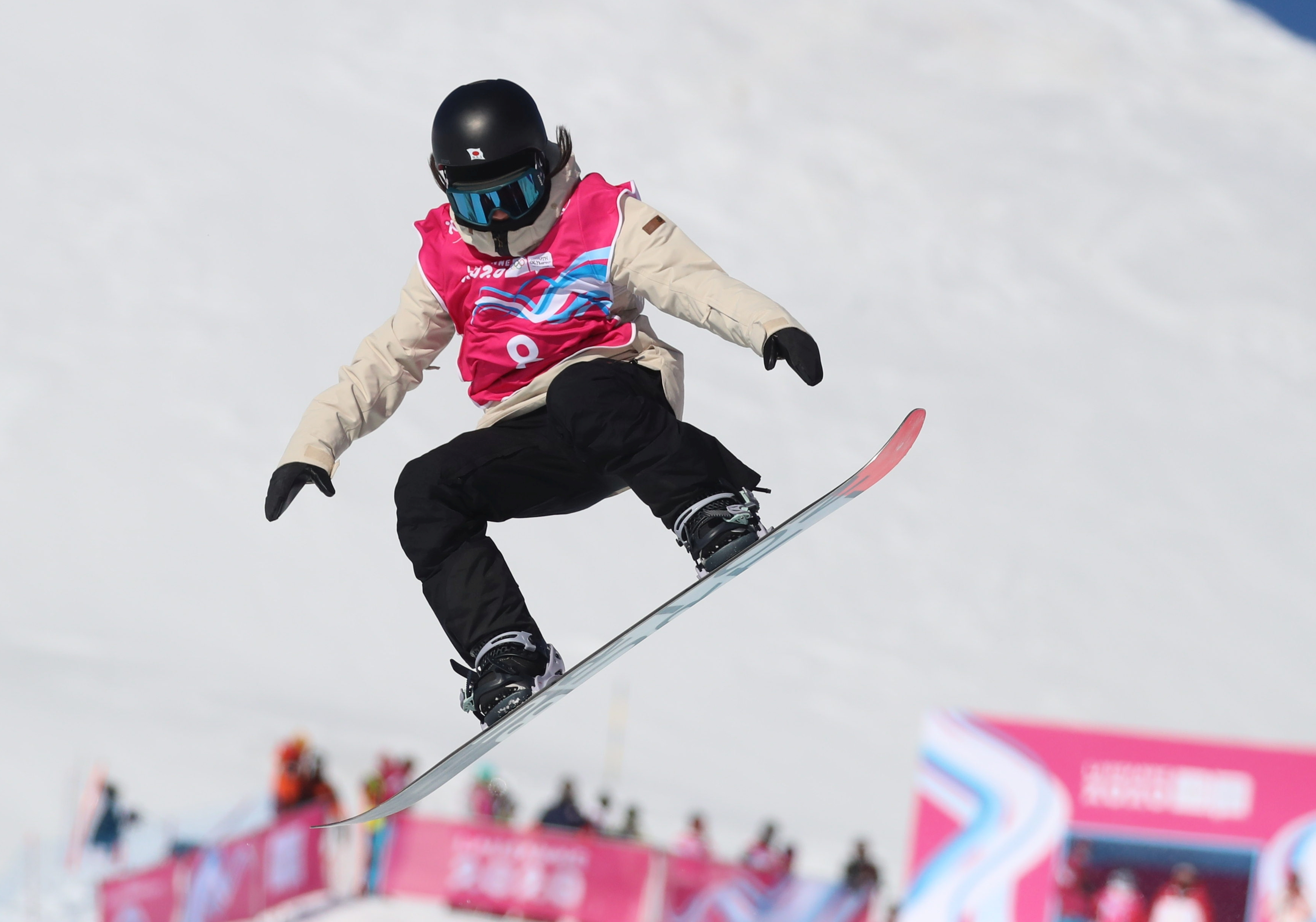
Manon Kaji

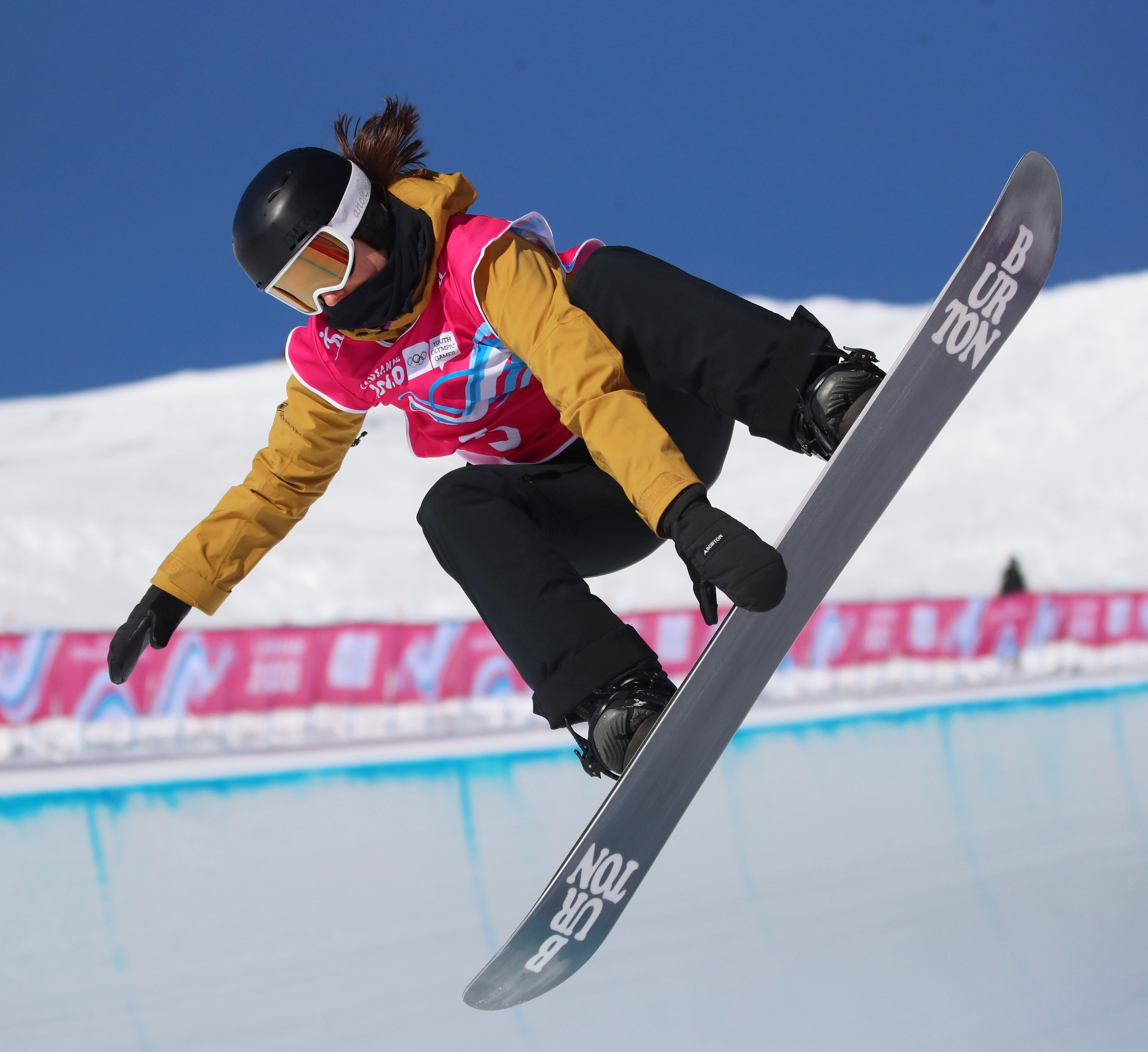
Berenice Wicki
