= Kali Gwegwe =

Nigerian sports executive (born 1969)

Kali Gwegwe (born 2 July 1969 in Oguta, Imo State, Nigeria) is the former chairman of Bayelsa United F.C., a Nigerian Premier League outfit based in Yenagoa, Bayelsa State. Prior to his appointment, he was the chairman of the Youth Sports Federation of Nigeria's (YSFON) Bayelsa State chapter. He is reputed to have groomed the bulk of all the new generation footballers (1998–2006) that come out of Bayelsa State—the home state of Finidi George and Samson Siasia.

The board of Bayelsa United that Kali Gwegwe was chairing was dissolved in controversial circumstances in November 2006. His ambitious plans to professionalize the club so as to eliminate corruption were openly resisted by some influential people on and outside the board of the club. He is, however, still the chairman of the Bayelsa State chapter of YSFON. As a non-governmental organization, the government has very little or no control over its activities.

Gwegwe came to the limelight when, between 1999 and 2006, he groomed local boys and won a number of competitions in Nigeria and Europe. He is also reputed to have been the first Nigerian to bring a youth team from Europe (Holmlia Sports Club of Oslo, Norway) to participate in a local football competition in Nigeria. During his short tenure as Chairman of Bayelsa United, players experienced an improved welfare package, with an increase of more than 100% in their salaries, allowances, and bonuses. According to Gwegwe, this was to reflect their professional status. Under him, the club was the first to remain at the top of league table from the beginning to the end of the first stanza.

Gwegwe is a native of Obogoro in the Yenagoa Local Government Area of Bayelsa State, in the Niger Delta area of Nigeria. He is also a public affairs analyst and commentator on contemporary issues. He is the founder of Nigeria Democracy Watchtower, an online-based group dedicated to improving the socio-political structure of Sub-Saharan Africa, using Nigeria as a case study.

Kali Gwegwe is currently the Sunday School Superintendent of New Glory Assembly, Yenagoa, Bayelsa State. He is also the National Vice President (South-South) of Youth Sports Federation of Nigeria (YSFON). Kali Gwegwe is also into fish farming. He is an author, blogger, public affairs analyst, and commentator on contemporary issues.

He is married to former Miss Ebiye Tuwei from Ekowe in the Southern Ijaw Local Government Area of Bayelsa State, Nigeria. They have three children, all boys: Michael (born in 1996), Henry (born in 2002), and Prince (born in 2004).
