= List of Ultraman manga characters =

The list below refers to characters of Ultraman, a manga sequel of the original 1966 tokusatsu series of the same name.

== SSSP ==
The Science Special Search Party (科学特捜隊, Kagaku Tokusō-tai), abbreviated as SSSP (スリーエス・ピー, Surī Esu Pī), is an attack team that had protected the Earth from monster threats and alien invasions from the past. Following Hayata's separation from Ultraman after his defeat from Zetton, SSSP disbanded and had its original base turned into The Giant of Light Memorial (光の巨人記念館, Hikari no Kyojin kinen-kan) museum made for remembering the SSSP and Ultraman's missions. In truth, the SSSP operated from shadows and had since protected Hayata and his entire family from being government test subjects after discovering his connection to Ultraman and the fact that he possessed what remains from Ultraman's power. The current SSSP is now led by Edo and several remaining members of the original SSSP.

As several outlaw aliens emerge, SSSP finally revealed themselves to the society and created Spacium (スペシウム, Supeshiumu)-empowered suits based on the original Ultraman, known as Ultraman Suits (ウルトラマンスーツ, Urutoraman Sūtsu) to counter these aliens. At one point, it was considered for cancellation until Shinjiro's development in his flying ability saved the project.

Shinjiro Hayata (早田進次郎（ハヤタ シンジロウ）, Hayata Shinjirō)
Voiced by: Ryohei Kimura (motion comic, anime), Megumi Han (child) (motion comic) (Japanese); Josh Hutcherson, Cassandra Lee Morris (child) (English)
The 17 year old protagonist of this manga. As the son of Shin Hayata, Shinjiro inherited his father's "Ultraman Factor" (ウルトラマン因子, Urutoraman Inshi), which gives him superhuman strength and resilience, as shown when he was able to survive from a fall at the age of 5. He also tried to master these abilities by jumping from high buildings while keeping it as a secret to resume a normal life. However, once the emergence of an alien named Bemular threatened him and his father's life, Shinjiro was forced to be enlisted as a member of SSSP. At the request of Edo, Shinjiro was provided with a finalized model of the Ultraman Suit which he used to fight against outlaw aliens, as well as inheriting the title "Ultraman". In a mock battle staged by SSSP, with the hired Red fighting against Shinjiro, the boy soon developed an additional ability to maneuver anti-gravity flight, thus saving the Utraman Suit project from cancellation.
While in use of the suit, Shinjiro utilizes a similar fighting stance to the original hero and wields a pair of Spacium Blades (スペシウムブレード, Supeshiumu Burēdo) underneath his arms. These blades can be modified when Shinjiro utilizes the original Ultraman's Spacium Ray (スペシウム光線, Supeshiumu Kōsen), performed by having his forearms form a cross stance, with his left arm in a horizontal position and placed forward while his right arm is in a vertical position and placed backward. In contrast to the original, Shinjiro's variant had the beam released from his left Spacium Blade instead of the right arm. The small light on his chest is the Limitter (リミッター, Rimittā) (based on Ultraman's Color Timer) which can be removed to access Shinjiro's full power as a last resort tactic. Edo soon provides him with a mimicry system which allows him to become "Ultraman" via holographic disguise should the Ultraman Suit be incapable of being deployed.
Shin Hayata (早田 進（ハヤタ・シン）, Hayata Shin)
Voiced by: Takayuki Sugō (motion comic), Hideyuki Tanaka (anime) (Japanese); Fred Tatasciore (English)
The original "Ultraman" and Shinjiro's father. He has been given the title of Minister of Defense at the beginning of the story. Long ago in the past, he bonded with Ultraman but loses his memory after the giant left him. Following the "dissolution" of SSSP, Hayata has settled down and had a family, with a son named Shinjiro Hayata. When Shinjiro was a 5-year-old child, Hayata discovered his son's abnormality when the boy fell from a great height and finally regained his lost memories after Ide showed him the footage of Bemular attacking an airplane. Hayata also inherited the Ultraman Factor (which also passed to Shinjiro) and unknowingly had his entire family protected by his former teammates from being the government's test subjects. Due to this, Hayata enlisted into the reformed SSSP once more and had a hand in developing the Ultraman Suits. Hayata wore the prototype of the Ultraman Suit, called the Proto Suit and first used it to fight Bemular when he threatened Shinjiro's safety. But as the suit was in fact a prototype, Hayata was defeated by Bemular until Shinjiro returned with the finalized Ultraman Suit, using it to fend off against Bemular before he retreated. Hayata would later oversee his son and the entire SSSP's activities after finally passing the "Ultraman" title to Shinjiro but once again returned to action when the Ace Killer Squad strikes. He is initially reluctant to have Shinjiro employed into SSSP, wanting his son to experience a normal life. He also views the Ultraman Factor as nothing more than a "curse".
The original Proto Suit (プロトスーツ, Puroto Sūtsu) seems to be identical to that of the finalized version, though lacking a helmet and had its color scheme being black. Hayata fights using the Ultraman's fighting stance in his memory but is comparably weaker due to being lag behind from its finalized version. When Hayata returns to action, the suit was given a helmet based on the finalized version to hide his identity. During the final battle in New York, the suit is further modified with indentations on the chest and shoulder armor, making it Hayata the counterpart to Zoffy, the leader of the Ultra Brothers.
Mitsuhiro Ide (井手 光弘（イデ・ミツヒロ）, Ide Mitsuhiro)
Voiced by: Masashi Ebara (motion comic), Ken Uo (anime) (Japanese); Brian Palermo (English)
A former member of the Japan Branch of the Science Special Search Party, and now chief of the Institute of Science and Technology (科学技術研究所, Kagaku Gijutsu Kenkyūsho). His intelligence in technology is expanded to the fact that he is able to fabricate footages, such as shrouding Bemular's plane attack as an accident to hide the alien's existence. He secretly has known that Hayata has recently transformed into Ultraman to fight monsters, revealing this fact to his friend at the Giant of Light Memorial, the secret base of the Science Special Search Party. He gives Shinjiro the Ultraman Suit and reveals the truth about his father to him. Although he usually appears stoic, he is angered by the Alien Adacic's actions.
Alien Zetton Edo (ゼットン星人・エド, Zetton Seijin Edo)
Voiced by: Shigeru Ushiyama (motion comic, anime), (Japanese); DC Douglas (English)
The last surviving member of the Alien Zetton race after SSSP destroyed them in their last invasion for Earth. Edo was approached by Ide to join the SSSP as he agreed, having lend a hand in developing the Ultraman Suits. As the presence of alien beings were supposed to be made secret, Edo bears a wristwatch that allows him to create holographic disguise of a human when walking out in the human world. Knowing that there are times when the Ultraman Suit cannot be deployed, he gave Shinjiro another mimicry system in his possession that allowed the boy to become "Ultraman" via holographic disguise. As humanity were initially unprepared for the arrival of aliens, Edo's residential area is in fact the Giant of Light Memorial. He often felt nostalgic whenever he watched the diorama display of Ultraman and Zetton, reminiscing his days as an invader. Being an Alien Zetton, Edo only needed to sleep for two minutes a day. He is later revealed to be supreme chairman of the Star Cluster Council.
In the anime, Edo masterminded a scheme to finish what his people began by first destroying Ultraman's credibility with the humans through Mephisto's help before killing Shinjiro with a Zetton to cement his ideals on humanity so they would join the Star Cluster Council of their free will. When the other Ultramen intervene and restore the peoples' faith in them, Edo equips Zetton-themed armor to personally battle Shinjiro and dies fighting him.
His appearance, such as wearing a business suit bears resemblance to the Alien Zetton infiltrator that appeared in episode 39 of Ultraman, along with the fact that his human form is also based on Dr. Iwamoto from said series, the same man that the Zettonian infiltrator used to disguise, though no connections between the two were revealed.
Dan Moroboshi (諸星弾（モロボシ・ダン）, Moroboshi Dan)
Voiced by: Tomokazu Seki (motion comic), Takuya Eguchi (anime) (Japanese); Liam O'Brien (English)
A stoic officer who had worked for a long time within SSSP. Although appearing as a human with short hair and glasses, he is in fact an alien in disguise. His job is to report to SSSP of any events and is usually dwelling around the Alien City for informations from police informant Jack. He has a rivalry with Shinjiro, doubted if the youth is fit enough to become an Ultraman. He also views Ultraman nothing more as an enforcer-like figure that instantly killed his opponents, which is not shared by the boy. Moroboshi later dons his own Ultraman Suit and revealed his alien heritage to Shinjiro when they pursue Seiji Hokuto. His name is in fact based on Dan Moroboshi from Ultra Seven.
Moroboshi's Ultraman Suit is called Ultraman Suit Ver.7 (ウルトラマンスーツVer.7, Urutoraman Sūtsu Bājon Sebun), which requires no Ultraman Factor and has a singular visor. His main weapon is the Spacium Sword (スペシウムソード, Supeshiumu Sōdo) katana and several throwing knives. According to Moroboshi, because of the lack of Ultraman Factor, his fighting skills relies on weaponries, as well as his swordsmanship. The Spacium Sword is empowered by Spacium energies and is capable of slicing through harder materials such as Alien Bris' exoskeleton. Soon, the Ultraman Suit was upgraded into Ver.7.2, which gives him an additional Spacium, two machine guns that are stored in his shoulders and a pair of Wide Shot (ワイドショット, Waido Shotto) cannons. The entire suit and its throwing knives are based on Ultraseven and his Eye Slugger. Meanwhile, the Wide Shot cannons is based on the similarly finisher attack of said giant warrior.
Akiko Fuji (富士明子（フジ・アキコ）, Fuji Akiko)
Voiced by: Hiroko Sakurai (motion comic) (Japanese)
A former member of the Science Special Search Team with Hayata and Ide, but is now Moroboshi's superior officer.
She is the only character to be reprised by the actor from the original tokusatsu series.

== Other Ultramen ==
Rena Sayama (佐山レナ, Sayama Rena)
Voiced by: Maaya Uchida (motion comic), Sumire Morohoshi (anime) (Japanese); Tara Sands (English)
A popular singer around Shinjiro's age. Her real name is Rena Endō (遠藤レナ, Endō Rena). She is a fan of the original Ultraman, a trait that was passed from her father, and has fallen for the human-sized "Ultraman" after he saved her from Adacic's assault, thus becoming the inspiration for her third single, "Ultlove" (ウルトラブ, Urutorabu). She has no awareness of "Ultraman's" true identity, but once, while visiting the Giant of Light Memorial, she appeared to Shinjiro and asked if they had met each other somewhere else. Rena has a strained relationship with her father due his obsession unmasking "Ultraman's" identity. She would later learn her mother was an alien who received a blood transfusion from Shin Hayata when she got injured during his fight with Zetton before she died from complications, giving Rena the Ultraman Factor as consequence. She wears the Ultraman Suit Marie (ウルトラマンスーツマリー, Urutoraman Sūtsu Marī) to become an Ultrawoman.
Seiji Hokuto (北斗星司（ホクト・セイジ）, Hokuto Seiji)
Voiced by: Megumi Han (motion comic, anime) (Japanese); Gunnar Sizemore (English)
A 16-year-old student in Shinjiro's school, later revealed to one of the survivors that Bemular saved during Ace Killer's attack, placed in Yapool's care while outfitted with prosthetic limbs. He is skilled in investigating and views Shinjiro as an older brother/senior, as well as supporting him through the use of his own Ultraman Suit. Although Shinjiro has no qualms with it, Moroboshi refuses to acknowledge the boy as an "Ultraman" and almost killed him if it weren't for Shinjiro. His main reason of fighting as an Ultraman, influenced by his desire for Yuko to be happy, is killing Ace Killer to avenge those who died in the plane crash incident and eliminate those who refuses coexistence between humans and aliens. His name is based on the main lead protagonist of Ultraman Ace.
Hokuto's Ultraman Suit is called Ver.A, which materializes by pounding his prosthetic fists together. This suit is an analogous of Ultraman Ace from his titular series.
Jack (ジャック, Jakku)
Voiced by: Keiji Fujiwara (motion comic). Ryota Takeuchi (anime) (Japanese); Robbie Daymond (English)
A human resident in the Alien City with superhuman strength, acting as an informant to Moroboshi. His real name is unknown. His job as an informant even leads him to multiple connections with several underworld alien organizations. He later acquires an bracelet build by Yapool to equip an Ultra Suit resembling Ultraman Jack from The Return of Ultraman.
Kotaro Higashi (東光太郎 (ヒガシコウタロウ), Higashi Kōtarō)
Voiced by: Tomoaki Maeno (Japanese); Roger Craig Smith (English)
A Japanese civilian whose work as a photographer in New York City led to him gaining the ability to become a flame-based being during a run-in with Black Star agents, becoming a vigilante hero who later names himself "Ultraman Taro". The Taro Suit that Yapool developed for Kotaro functions as a limiter to prevent his flames from causing collateral damage.

== Alien City Residents ==
The Alien City (異星人達の『街』, Iseijin-tachi no "machi") is a hidden city beneath the surface. The only gateway to the surface are called Portals (ポータル, Pōtaru), which installed in every country in the world while guarded by their respective governments. Accordingly, not many human lives in the Alien City, as the one identified so far is Jack.

Red (レッド, Reddo)
Voiced by: Shirō Saitō (motion comic) (Japanese)
A giant alien with a long neck and a pointed head. He was originally a popular boxer, but has recently been dethroned by Jack, which also costed his right eye. Red King soon appeared to Jack and Shinjiro and demanded a rematch, with Jack instead sent in the boy as his replacement until Moroboshi stopped the fight in the midway. Sometime later, Red and Jack was hired by SSSP to create a commotion in the human world in hopes of witnessing any improvements in the Ultraman Suit. Prior to the attack, Jack had Red appeared in the human world through the use of wristwatch-type mimicry system that disguised him as a kindergarten child. While fighting Red, Shinjiro/"Ultraman" developed an ability to perform anti-gravity flight, allowing SSSP to maintain the Ultraman Suit project and gave Jack the signal to stop Red's assault.
Red's appearance is based on Red King from episode 8 of Ultraman. The limited edition of chapter 4 of the manga stated that its true name is Rihyarenoru-Dasumohira-Vashizurihhe (リヒャレノル・ダスモヒーラ・ヴァシズリッヘ), but due to the overly long name, Jack instead called him "Red" due to his resemblance to said monster.
Alien Igaru Pigmon (イガル星人・ピグモン, Igaru Seijin Pigumon)
Voiced by: Kentarō Itō (motion comic) (Japanese); Michael Yurchak (English)
A short and timid alien who was Rena's fan, formerly a prince from his home world who represented them in the Star Cluster Council. He took refuge on Earth after most of his kind were destroyed, taking a hikikomori lifestyle with his only connection to the outside world being an online website dedicated to Rena. Pigmon ended up befriending three fellow Rena fans who learned of his identity and exploit him into hiring Bris to kill those who troll the site. This results in Pygmon's death when Adad attacked Rena's concert to force the guilt-ridden alien into showing up and take an attack meant for Rena.
Although his initial appearance was timid, his true form was rather quite big and had a large tail. In his diminutive form, his body has a huge resilience. He is based on Pigmon from episode 8 of Ultraman.

== Star Cluster Council ==
Star Cluster Council (星団評議会, Seidan hyōgi-kai) is an alliance of intergalactic alien races that considers the Ultraman race and its lingering traces as threats to universal peace, revealed to be created by the mysterious Zetton Core to carry out its will.

Ambassador Mephisto (メフィスト大使, Mefisuto Taishi)
Voiced by: Kōji Ishii (Japanese); Ray Chase (English)
A member of the Mefilas race who is a representative of the Star Cluster Council and head of its Japan branch, enlisting Adad to track down Bemular.
Sukuruda Alien Adad (スクルーダ星人・アダド, Sukurūda Seijin Adado)
Voiced by: Kazuhiko Inoue (motion comic), Kenjiro Tsuda (anime) (Japanese); Steve Blum (English)
An alien immigration agent under the Star Cluster Council's employment whose primary mission is to track down Yapool on Earth. But his actions seems questionable due to the lengths he would go like committing atrocities on Earth by killing civilians. He first appeared trying to kill Rena and her fans in her 2018 concert as part of his scheme to ensnare and kill Pygmon, battling the Ultramen with Bemular briefly joining the fight. But after reporting Bemular's whereabouts to Mephisto, he later met with Bemular in private.
Adad's weapons are a knife stored on his rear waist and a combat staff used to counter Moroboshi's Spacium Sword. Aside from that, he is also able to use brute strength, due to modifications made on him and his people after his entire race being deemed too weak.
Adad is based on the Dada race that first appeared in episode 28 of Ultraman.

== Black Star ==
Black Star (暗黒の星, Anokoku no Hoshi) is an alien terrorist organization who believe their superiority gives them the right to conquer Earth, employing Alien Bado as foot soldiers.

Pedan (ペダン, Pedan)
The leader of Black Star, leading the initial invasion of Earth with his demise arranged as a gambit for the next invasion force.
Dealer (ディーラー, Dīrā)
Pedan's right hand, a strong alien who abducted Rei while he attacked Dan's family years ago.
Bell (ベル, Beru)
A four-armed swordsman.
Rubik (ルビック, Rubikku)
Rei (レイ)
Dan's twin brother who Dealer abducted as a child, his body becoming a vessel for a Black Star member.
Druz (ドルズ, Doruzu)

== Other aliens ==
Bemular (べムラー, Bemurā)
Voiced by: Tsutomu Isobe (motion comic), Kaiji Soze (anime) (Japanese); Matthew Mercer (English)
A mysterious alien who initially appeared to be the series' primary antagonist, assumed to be responsible for Ace Killer's attack twelve years prior. He since made himself an enemy of SSSP and Hayata by attempting to avoid them from participating the Star Cluster Council. Having fought against Hayata, he soon targeted Shinjiro for inheriting the Ultraman Factor. Although seemingly able to win against Hayata, the arrival of Shinjiro in finalized Ultraman Suit turn the tides and blew his entire left body before retreating. He soon reappeared once more sometime later and spied the activities of Rena and her father, Endo. He also appeared during Adad's rampage in Rena's concert and the two join forces against Shinjiro and Moroboshi in their Ultraman Suits. After the truth behind the plane attack is revealed, Bemular is later revealed to be the original Ultraman that bonded with Hayata.
Bemular's main fighting skills involves ranged combat and entirely relies on a purple exosuit he wears, which seemingly shared/based on the Ultraman Suit models. The exosuit possess built-in energy cannons and hidden arms. Bemular is themed after the similarly named monster from episode 1 of Ultraman, even revealed to be the first villain Shinjiro faced.
Alien Adacic (エイダシク星人, Eidashiku Seijin)
Voiced by: Yamato Kinjo (motion comic) (Japanese); Xander Mobus (English)
A petty criminal and the second enemy that Shinjiro fought, whose race was banned from entering Earth due to them hunting humanity for food. One single member managed to slip in by an unknown party and provided with equipment that allow him to hunt human victims. His attacks attracted the SSSP's attention and led to a fight with Shinjiro before he escaped. Sometime later, he almost killed Rena and her agent until Shinjiro reappeared and killed him through the removal of his Limiter. Although having saved the day, this event left him traumatized, due to Adacic being his first kill, as well as Edo and Ide discovered that there are more perpetrators behind the death of civilians with strange barcodes. Also before his death, Adacic realised that the third party that allow him to slip into Earth was manipulating him all along just to fight Shinjiro in his Ultraman Suit.
Adacic's main feature is a long tongue that he used to feed on human flesh and transfer their blood into his mouth area. Through a third party, he was provided with mechanical pincers that can launch plasma projectiles and a suit-like human disguise to approach his prey. He is themed after Cicada Human from Ultra Q while his pincers are in-jokes to the suit being modified into Alien Baltan in episode 2 of Ultraman.
Alien Kadder (カッダー星人, Kaddā Seijin)
Voiced by: Genya Ohira (Japanese); Lucien Dodge (English)
An alien criminal that SSSP faced at a warehouse, he was defeated by Shinjiro and brought to custody after begging for mercy to be spared.
Alien Bris (ブリス星人, Burisu Seijin)
Voiced by: Chihiro Nishimori (Japanese)
An alien hired by Alien Igaru Pigmon to kill officers Endo and Kurata after the two stalked him under the assumption for serial murders. This alien was faced by SSSP members and was killed by Moroboshi in his Ultraman Suit Ver.7.
He is based on Alien Metron from episode 8 of Ultra Seven.
Yapool (ヤプール, Yapūru)
Voiced by: Akio Nojima (Japanese); Mick Wingert (English)
An alien who was originally a scientist working for the Star Cluster Council. He disappeared from the group sometime later and had disguised as a human on Earth as he became the caretaker of Seiji Hokuto, creating the boy's prosthetic limbs after surviving the plane crash 12 years prior. Some of his inventions were contributed to the Ultraman Suits. He also created non-SSSP manufactured Ultraman Suits for Seiji, Jack, and Kotaro to use.
He is based on Yapool, the main antagonist of Ultraman Ace.
Yuko Minami (南 夕子, Minami Yuko)
Voiced by: Megumi Han (Japanese); Erin Fitzgerald (English)
An alien whose appearance resembles that of a human. She is a childhood friend of Seiji Hokuto.
Zetton (ゼットン, Zetton)
A beetle-like Kaiju created as a bioweapon by the Zettonians to conquer planets, being the original Ultraman's final opponent. In the anime, Edo arranged for a Zetton to appear on Earth as part of his endgame to subjugate humanity by destroying the current Ultraman.

== Civilians ==
Yosuke Endo (遠藤庸介, Endō Yosuke)
Voiced by: Kazuhiro Yamaji. Eiji Hanawa (anime) (Japanese); Chris Edgerly (English)
A police officer who is unwittingly drawn into the world of aliens living on the Earth during his investigations. Both him and daughter are huge fans of the original Ultraman, but he is not able to accept the Ultraman Suit as heroes, dismissing them as SSSP's agents, and he is determined to unmask "Ultraman's" identity. However, Rena doesn't approve of this, resulting in the straining of their family relationship.
Kurata (倉田)
Voiced by: Reona Irie, Hirokazu Sekido (anime) (Japanese); Lucien Dodge (English)
Endo's junior partner.
Hokuto's mother
Voiced by: Miho Masaka (Japanese)
Hokuto's mother who was killed during Ace Killer's attack.
