= Mary Elizabeth Kail =

American poet

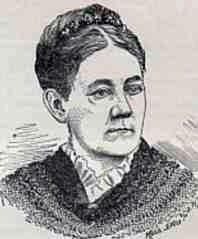
Kail circa 1880

Mary Elizabeth Kail (1828 – January 28, 1890) was an American poet, and the editor of the Connotton Valley Times.

== Biography ==
Mary was born Mary Elizabeth Harper in 1827 or 1828 in Washington, D.C., to Andrew Harper and Mary McDermott-Roe. His mother was the daughter of Cornelius McDermott-Roe, laborer in the employ of George Washington. Mary's father Andrew died young, possibly of malaria, while Mary and her sister Virginia Harper were children. Mary and Virginia relocated together to Carroll County, Ohio, and on May 18, 1843, Mary married Gabriel Kail (1814–1888). Mary and Gabriel had five children: Maria Bell Kail (1844–1917), Virginia Elizabeth Kail (1847–1917), Albert Kail (1856-?), Emma Kail (c1857-?), and actor Jay Wirt Kail (1861-?).

By 1878, Mary was editor of the Connotton Valley Times in Carroll County, Ohio. In the late 1880s, Mary was a clerk for the United States Department of Treasury. She lost her position September 1885 due to a change in administration.

Mary died January 28, 1890, in Washington, D.C., or in Ohio.

== Publications ==
- "His Footstep at the Door" (1872) with music by Horace E. Kimball
- "The Hero of Our Wilderness" (1872) with music by Horace E. Kimball
- "Our Silver Wedding Song" (1882)
- Crown our heroes, and other poems (1887)
- In 1876 she wrote campaign lyrics for the song Hold the Fort for Hayes and Wheeler.
