= Kale Cezario =

Ghanaian politician

Hon. Kale Cezario
- President: John Dramani Mahama

Personal details
- Born: Ghana
- Party: NDC

Kale Cezario is a Ghanaian politician and a former deputy Upper West Regional Minister of Ghana. He was appointed by President John Evan Atta Mills and served until January 2013.
