= Kail (disambiguation) =

Kail is a municipality in Rhineland-Palatinate, Germany.

Kail may also refer to:

- KAIL, TCT station in Fresno, California
- Kail (surname)
- Kaïl Boudache (born 2006), French footballer
