= Kali Mutsa =

Kali Mutsa is the name of a singer and band from Santiago, Chile. The members consist of French-Chilean actress Celine Reymond and Chilean producer/keyboardist Cristobal Montes who perform respectively under the Kali Mutsa and Sandoje Catiri alter-egos. Their music is an original mix of Andean, gypsy, Bhangra (Bollywood) and electronic sounds, along with lyrics in Romani (gipsy) and Spanish.

== History ==
According to their website, the character Kali was born sometime in 1920 in the Valley of Pachacuti to Gitano parents whom she lost in an accident that left her orphaned at a young age. She was then rescued and raised by an Aymara chief and his princess wife, and at 15 began her artistic journey as a belly dancer, singer and actress. This led her to be discovered by the musical composer and film director of Amazonian origin, Sandoje Catiri. Together, their art gained Kali Mutsa fame throughout Latin America, which leads her to eventually become the representative for her region and guide her people into revolution until she fell silent and mysteriously disappeared. Today, at over 90 years of age, Kali reappears in the body of actress Celine Reymond.

== Discography ==
=== Ambrolina EP ===
On October 18, 2011, the band released Ambrolina under independent Miami, FL label SHOCK music. The album and lead single, "Tunupa," were featured and reviewed by music blogs and sites worldwide such as Club Fonograma, Time Out Barcelona, ReMezcla, Sounds and Colours and NPR's Alt.Latino who called Kali Mutsa “(One) of our favorite artists this year”. Multiple sources have likened her to rapper and artist M.I.A. Latin alternative music blog Club Fonograma named both the EP and single "Tunupa" one of the Best of 2011 and called Ambrolina “a highly original work… her mysteriousness is grandiose… one of the most ambitious extended plays of the year”.

In November 2011, Kali Mutsa released the video for their first official single, "Tunupa." It was directed by Paul Felmer and taped in locations such as the Cajon del Maipo canyon and hot springs in the Andes Mountains area, as well as a studio in Santiago, Chile. PuertoRicoIndie.com called it “an explosion of colors and retro-spatial visuals that invite you to explore (Kali) further”. Kali Mutsa made it to numerous 2011 end-of-year “Best of” lists, including Redbull Panamerika (Single, Album, and Video), Club Fonograma (Song and Album), Remezcla (Song), and Sounds and Colours (Album).

=== Souvenance LP ===
In 2014 the singer Celine Reymond hired Chilean-Dutch music producer and filmmaker Erasmo de la Parra to co-produce Kali Mutsa's first full-length album. De La Parra progressively changed the musical style that was previously focused on klezmer, gypsy and Balkan music. Also contributing with more Latin American, indigenous and Indian sounds. An example of this is the song Traga Traga which is a combination of Surinamese Caribbean rhythms such as 'Bubbling' combined with Bollywood samples and Dutch rave synths. This song was the spark for their singer Celine Reymond to establish her separation from the band and continue as a soloist. With a more modernist sound, which would be heard later on her next EP, Mesmer. Souvenance consists of 16 tracks, linked by experimental interludes. The album was released by the Miami-based label Shock Entertainment.

=== Mesmer EP ===
Her third release, titled Mesmer EP, was inspired by German Physician and mystic Franz Mesmer. It was produced by Erasmo de la Parra and Pablo Stipicic. The six tracks of the EP contain classic film samples from the 40s and 50s combined with violent rhythms. It also contains samples from Japanese anime's like 'Full Metal Alchemist' which appears in her song Sanpaku. The song Wakan Tangan contains a sample of Mambo de Machaguay a popular song by Chilean rock band Los Jaivas a fact related to the familiarity of De La Parra with the band. In this EP, Kali Mutsa made the leap to a more daring and contemporary sound and was her first release as a solo artist. The EP was released by London-based record label ENDMK.

== Tours ==
Since their inception in 2010, Kali Mutsa have performed extensively in their native city of Santiago, Chile as well as in Buenos Aires, Argentina and made their US debut at South by Southwest (SXSW) Music Conference and Festival in Austin, TX in March 2012.
