= The Chronicles of Kale =

Young adult fantasy novel series by Aya Knight

- The Chronicles of Kale: A Dragon's Awakening; The Chronicles of Kale: Dawn of Retribution; The Chronicles of Kale: Breath of Light
- Author: Aya Knight
- Country: United States
- Language: English
- Genre: Fantasy; High fantasy; Young adult fiction
- Publisher: Silver Knight Publishing
- No. of books: 3

The Chronicles of Kale is a series of three young adult fantasy novels by Aya Knight.

The three books in the series are: The Chronicles of Kale: A Dragon's Awakening (2011), The Chronicles of Kale: Dawn of Retribution (2012), and The Chronicles of Kale: Breath of Light (2015).

== The Chronicles of Kale: A Dragon's Awakening ==
The Chronicles of Kale: A Dragon's Awakening is the first book of the series and was published in 2011 by Silver Knight Publishing.

=== Reception ===
Reviews of The Chronicles of Kale: A Dragon's Awakening generally praised the book's story, but criticized the prose.

Publishers Weekly stated that "Despite an intriguing premise, Knight's mediocre prose and weak metaphors ("an emotional stone hit him in the chest") leave the book feeling deflated and unoriginal. There is an action-packed story behind the latticework of second-rate plot devices, but it simply isn't worth a reader's time to try to discover it. "

Library Journal stated that "Knight's debut novel, the first in a series, presents a cast of sympathetic characters and explores the bittersweet coming of age of an individual trapped in an unfamiliar body. . . . Despite anachronisms and patches of awkward prose, the author's ability to tell a good story shines through, and this makes Kale a suitable addition to larger collections of adult and YA fantasy as well as an appealing read for dragon lovers of all ages."

== The Chronicles of Kale: Dawn of Retribution ==
The Chronicles of Kale: Dawn of Retribution is the second book of the series and was published in 2012 by Silver Knight Publishing.

== The Chronicles of Kale: Breath of Light ==
The Chronicles of Kale: Breath of Light is the third and final book of the series and was published in 2015 by Silver Knight Publishing.
