= Jossy Dombraye =

Nigerian footballer and manager

Personal information
- Place of birth: Nigeria
- Position: Winger

Senior career*
Years	Team	Apps	(Gls)
- Sharks F.C.

International career
1971–1974	Nigeria		
- * Club domestic league appearances and goals

Josiah "Jossy" Dombraye is a former Nigerian football forward and manager, most recently on the technical staff of Bayelsa United F.C. He spent most of his career with Sharks F.C. and was part of the Nigeria national football team that won the 1973 All-Africa Games.

He was part of the Mid-Western State team that played Brazilian team Santos in 1969.
