= Manon Kaji =

Japanese snowboarder (born 2004)

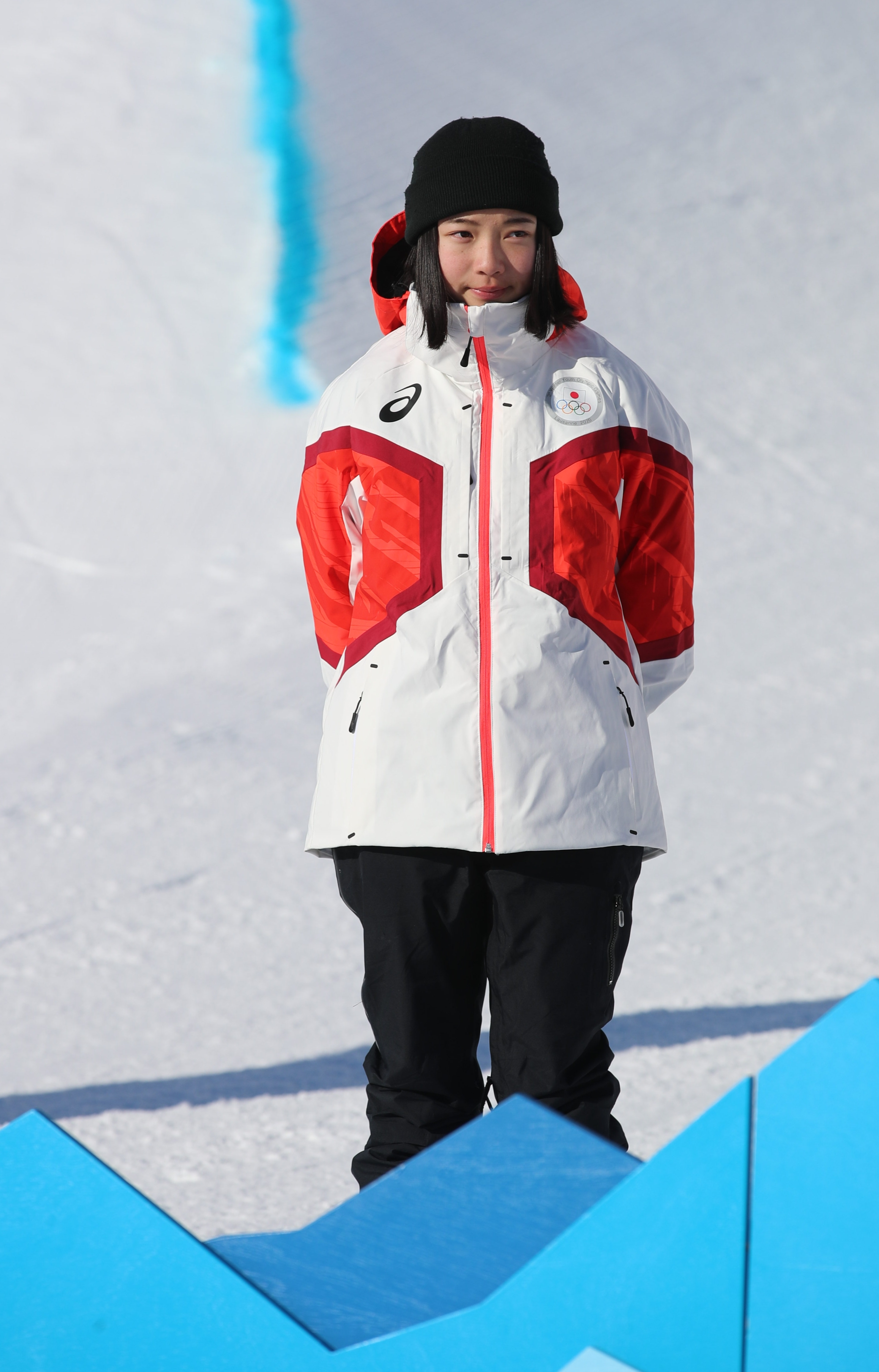
- Kaji at the 2020 Winter Youth Olympics

Personal information
- Nationality: Japan
- Born: 24 August 2004 (age 21) Uozu, Toyama, Japan

Sport
- Sport: Snowboarding
- Event: Halfpipe
Medal record
Women's snowboarding
Representing Japan
Winter Youth Olympic Games
| Silver medal – second place | 2020 Lausanne | Halfpipe |
Junior World Championships
| Gold medal – first place | 2021 Krasnoyarsk | Halfpipe |

Manon Kaji (Japanese: 鍛治 茉音, Hepburn: Kaji Manon; born 24 August 2004) is a Japanese snowboarder. She medaled silver at the 2020 Winter Youth Olympics in the girls' halfpipe event and gold at the 2021 FIS Snowboarding Junior World Championships in the women's halfpipe event.

== Early life and education ==
Kaji was born on 24 August 2004 in Uozu, Toyama Prefecture. She attended Koho High School. Both of her parents are snowboarders, and she began snowboarding when she was four years old.

== Career ==
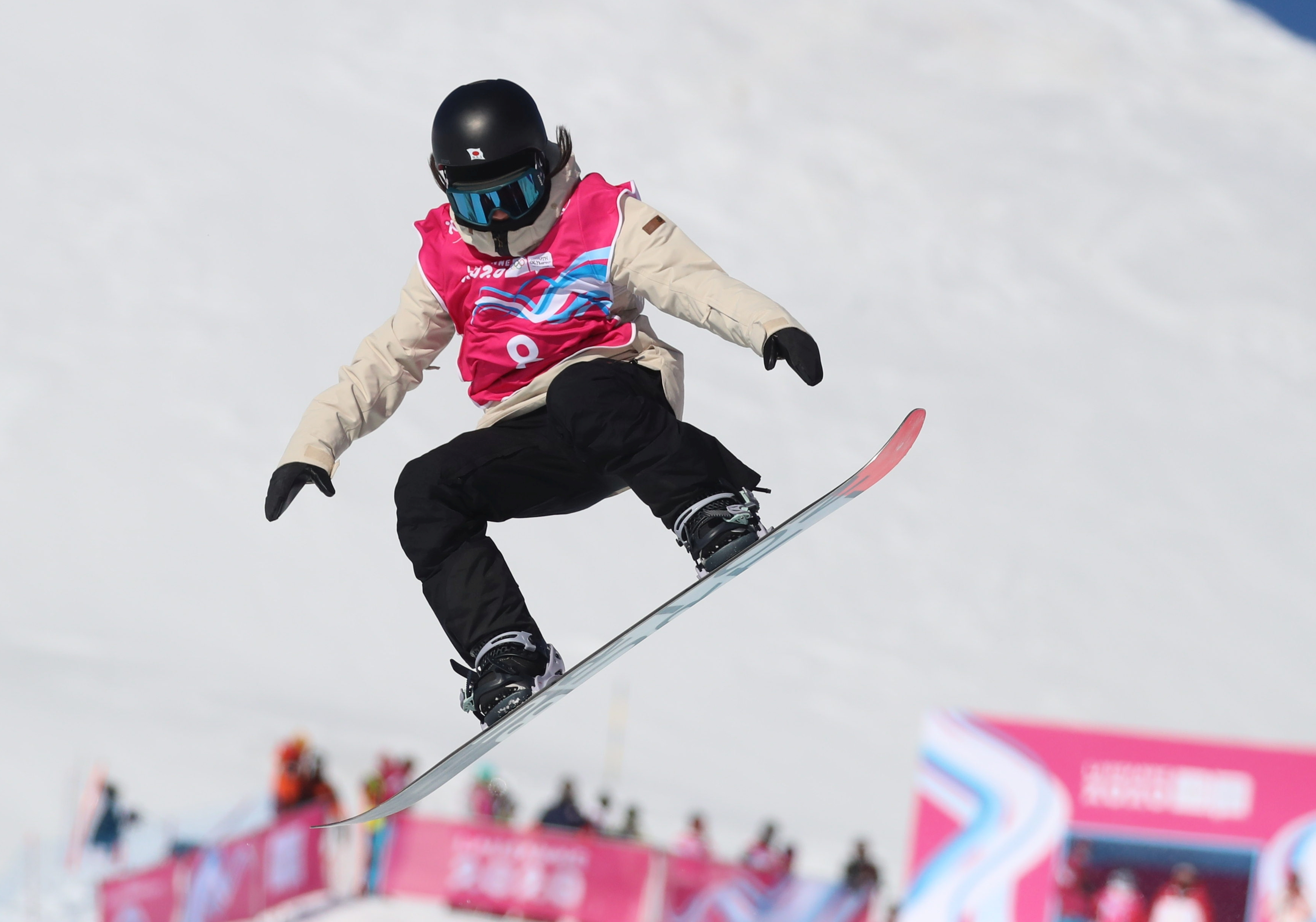
Kaji at the 2020 Winter Youth Olympics

=== Nor-Am Cup ===
At the 2019–20 FIS Snowboard Nor-Am Cup, Kaji finished 3rd for Halfpipe #1 and 1st for Halfpipe #2.

=== Winter Youth Olympics ===
Kaji represented Japan at the 2020 Winter Youth Olympics in the girls' halfpipe event, where she ranked second throughout, medaling silver with a score of 85.33.

=== Junior World Championships ===
Kaji participated in the 2021 FIS Snowboarding Junior World Championships where she medaled gold in the women's halfpipe event.

== Other ventures ==
Kaji is sponsored by Roxy, a women's clothing line by Quiksilver.
