= List of Kaiji characters =

Characters from the series, including (from right to left): Kaiji Itō, Seiya Ichijō, Tarō Ōtsuki (back), Yukio Tonegawa, Takashi Muraoka (front), Kazuya Hyōdō, Kazutaka Hyōdō (background), Kōtarō Sakazaki (front), and Yūji Endō

The Kaiji manga series (and its anime and film adaptations) features an extensive cast of characters created by Nobuyuki Fukumoto.

== Kaiji Itō ==
Voiced by: Masato Hagiwara (Japanese); Jeremy Gee (English)
Portrayed by: Tatsuya Fujiwara (live-action), Taiki Yamazaki (stage play)

Kaiji Itō (伊藤 開司, Itō Kaiji) is a young gambler who moves to Tokyo after high school, where he spends his days drinking and vandalizing cars. When coerced onto the gambling ship Espoir to settle a coworker's debt, he enters a world of high-stakes gambling. Despite his lazy, self-indulgent nature and lack of life goals—traits that earn him the derogatory label "human scum"—Kaiji demonstrates extraordinary courage and strategic brilliance in life-threatening situations. His gambling addiction dates back to high school, where he frequently arrived late while spending excessive time and money on pachinko and pachislot machines.

Kaiji possesses remarkable resilience, described as "a man who can get up at the last minute" and capable of defeating formidable opponents like Tonegawa and Hyōdō. While fiercely loyal to those he trusts, he has suffered repeated betrayals that leave him increasingly cynical. Despite his hardened exterior, he frequently risks personal gain to help others in desperate situations, displaying a paradoxical mix of kindness and naivety.

His gambling prowess earns him legendary status in the underworld, though he consistently finds himself pitted against the Teiai organization. Kaiji recognizes this inescapable connection, yet continues to seek out dangerous games despite the consequences.

== Teiai Group ==
=== Yūji Endō ===
Voiced by: Naoya Uchida, Kenjiro Tsuda (Mr. Tonegawa: Middle Management Blues) (Japanese); David Matranga (English)
Portrayed by: Yūki Amami (as Rinko Endō (遠藤 凛子, Endō Rinko)) (live-action), Kentarou Kanesaki (stage play)

Yūji Endō (遠藤 勇次, Endō Yūji) serves as president of Endō Finance, a Teiai Group subsidiary that operates as a predatory lending operation with exorbitant interest rates. He first appears collecting a debt from Kaiji, subsequently luring him onto the gambling ship Espoir. As a member of Tonegawa's faction within Teiai, Endō's position declines following Tonegawa's dismissal. He later sends Kaiji to an underground labor facility per Teiai's strict policies.

During Kaiji's battle against the Bog, Endō provides additional loans while secretly planning to exploit their agreement. After their victory, he drugs Kaiji and Sakazaki, then enforces a crushing 30% interest rate compounded every ten minutes. Despite this ruthless action, he shows unexpected restraint by adhering strictly to the contract terms and not confiscating Sakazaki's share. In later events, Endō leads Teiai's manhunt operations as head of the Kaiji-Chang-Mario pursuit team.

The live-action adaptation reimagines the character as Rinko Endō, a female Teiai executive who competes with Tonegawa. After losing this power struggle, she finances Kaiji's E-Card battle with similar loan terms, ultimately leaving the organization with substantial funds following Kaiji's victory.

=== Yukio Tonegawa ===
Voiced by: Hakuryu, Toshiyuki Morikawa (Mr. Tonegawa: Middle Management Blues) (Japanese); Dave Harbold (English)
Portrayed by: Teruyuki Kagawa (live-action), Eiji Moriyama (stage play)

Yukio Tonegawa (利根川 幸雄, Tonegawa Yukio) is a high-ranking Teiai Group executive and Kaiji's primary antagonist in the series' first part. He oversees deadly gambling events, using ruthless rhetoric to manipulate debtors. A cunning strategist, he disdains weakness and remains unmoved by their suffering.

Kaiji defeats him in the E-Card game by exploiting his overconfidence, costing Tonegawa his position. As punishment, he endures the Grilling Grovel, lasting an unprecedented 12.47 seconds before being cast out of Teiai. His later fate is unclear.

A prequel spin-off, Mr. Tonegawa: Middle Management Blues, depicts his earlier career comically. In live-action films, he first loses to Kaiji in Kaiji, then betrays him in Kaiji 2 after a temporary alliance, stealing his winnings but leaving a token sum. The films end with Tonegawa watching enviously as Kaiji celebrates with friends.

=== Kazutaka Hyōdō ===
Voiced by: Masane Tsukayama (Japanese); Marty Fleck (English)
Portrayed by: Kei Satō (live-action), Mitsu Murata (stage play)

Kazutaka Hyōdō (兵藤 和尊, Hyōdō Kazutaka) is the ruthless chairman of the Teiai Group and the series' primary antagonist. A wealthy and power-hungry businessman, he seeks to build a financial empire that would sustain him even in societal collapse. A sadist, he enjoys manipulating high-stakes gambles and inflicting suffering on debtors, enforcing brutal penalties such as forced labor, mutilation, or death. Despite his cruelty, he occasionally displays fairness and ethical conflict, such as hesitating over exposing his son Kazuya to violent games. Though he admires Kaiji's defiance, he ultimately views him as inferior and relishes his downfall.

Hyōdō first appears in silhouette at the conclusion of the first arc before directly confronting Kaiji in a high-stakes gamble known as the "Tissue Box Lottery", where he asserts his dominance as the undisputed king of Teiai. In later arcs, he and his organization remain persistent obstacles in Kaiji's path. He is married to Sophie, a foreign woman, and has two sons, Kazuki and Kazuya.

Spin-offs depict him as erratic, often berating subordinates like Tonegawa and imposing harsh conditions on workers.

== Gambling Apocalypse: Kaiji / Kaiji: Ultimate Survivor ==
=== Takeshi Furuhata ===
Voiced by: Yasunori Matsumoto (Japanese); Tyler Galindo (English)
Portrayed by: Hiroki Sana (stage play)

Takeshi Furuhata (古畑 武志, Furuhata Takeshi) is a debtor and one-time coworker of Kaiji, Furuhata is the one who initiated Kaiji's entry into the underworld. He is timid and easily influenced by others. A debt collector encouraged him to make Kaiji his cosigner and he disappears, but is eventually reunited with Kaiji on the Espoir and they fight through the Restricted Rock-paper-scissors gamble together. Eventually, though Andō incited him to betray Kaiji, both of them are punished by the resurrected Kaiji and lose their surplus stars and money. In the end, he could not pay off the debt and ended up saddled with new debts on the ship. His whereabouts after that are unknown. He is only mentioned once by name in the live-action adaptation.

=== Mamoru Andō ===
Voiced by: Toshiharu Sakurai (Japanese); Sean Patrick Judge (English)
Portrayed by: Yuya Miyashita (stage play)

Mamoru Andō (安藤 守, Andō Mamoru) is an overweight, glasses-wearing participant in the gambling tournament aboard the Espoir. He initially allies with Kaiji and Furuhata but quickly betrays them for personal gain. During the final stage of the competition, when tasked with rescuing Kaiji as part of their survival strategy, Andō succumbs to greed and convinces Furuhata to abandon their agreement. His attempt to sacrifice Kaiji for financial gain fails when Kaiji escapes independently. Though Andō survives the event, he incurs additional debts from the ship's operations.

=== Kōji Ishida ===
Voiced by: Hiroshi Yanaka (Japanese); John Swasey (English)
Portrayed by: Ken Mitsuishi (live-action), Takeshi Nadagi (stage play)

Kōji Ishida (石田 光司, Ishida Kōji) is a deeply indebted middle-aged man characterized by his timid and trusting nature. He joins the Espoir gambling event to repay debts for his wife and son, but is deceived and sent to forced labor. Kaiji, moved by Ishida's genuine concern for his well-being, rescues him.

Later, Ishida participates in the Starside Hotel gambling event, winning a ¥10 million voucher in the first Human Derby race. During the perilous Electrified Steel Beam Crossing, his fear paralyzes him, and he entrusts his winnings to Kaiji to settle his family's debts. Choosing silence to avoid distracting Kaiji, he falls to his death—an act that profoundly affects Kaiji, who admires Ishida's dignity and selflessness.

In the live-action adaptation, Ishida allies with Kaiji on the Espoir and defeats Funai, but an extra card results in his consignment to underground labor alongside Kaiji.

=== Jōji Funai ===
Voiced by: Hideo Ishikawa (Japanese); Gabriel Regojo (English)
Portrayed by: Tarō Yamamoto (live-action), Kōsuke Kujirai (stage play)

Jōji Funai (船井 譲次, Funai Jōji) is a cunning participant on the Espoir. As a repeat contestant, he uses his experience to manipulate newcomers, notably cheating Kaiji out of two star chips and nearly eliminating him from the competition. Though consistently outmaneuvering other players throughout the event, Funai ultimately miscalculates the game's dynamics. When only Kaiji remains as his opponent, he must accept a high-stakes duel that decides their fates. His ultimate fate after the event remains undisclosed.

In the live-action film adaptations, Funai similarly deceives Kaiji during the Restricted Rock-Paper-Scissors game, but loses when Kaiji discovers his cheating method. The sequel depicts Funai working as a surface agent for the underground operations after his Espoir defeat, where he administers the "Princess and the Slave" gambling event. His attempt to exact revenge on Kaiji during this game fails, resulting in his return to forced labor.

=== Balance Theorist ===
Voiced by: Kenichi Ono (Japanese); Bobby Haworth (English)
Portrayed by: Gaku Matsuda (stage play)

The Balance Theorist (バランス理論の男, Baransu Riron no Otoko) (real name unknown), known as Hyena (ハイエナ, Haiena) in the anime series and Sugita (杉田) in the stage play adaptation, is one of the participants on the Espoir. He targets opponents with few remaining star chips, earning him the derogatory nickname "Hyena" from Kaiji. His method involves carefully managing his remaining cards to maintain balance throughout the game. When challenging Kaiji, who feigns vulnerability with only one star, the Balance Theorist falls victim to Kaiji's counterstrategy that exploits his predictable pattern, resulting in his decisive defeat.

=== Kitami ===
Voiced by: Kazuki Yao (Japanese); Scott Gibbs (English)
Portrayed by: Sotaro (live-action), Ryōma Baba (stage play)

Kitami (北見) is one of the participants on the Espoir's Restricted Rock-Paper-Scissors event. Though inexperienced, he quickly devises card-monopolization tactics, first targeting rock, then paper cards after Kaiji counters him. When Kaiji outmaneuvers him in a decisive match, Kitami's team fractures due to his arrogant demeanor, leading his partners to accept Kaiji's offer to betray him. Forced to pay ¥2 million to exit, Kitami's defeat demonstrates both his adaptability and his ultimate failure to maintain alliances.

=== Okabayashi ===
Voiced by: Tomohiro Nishimura (Japanese); Chris Hutchinson (English)

Okabayashi (岡林) is a cynical participant in the Espoir gambling event. He deliberately enters the ship's punishment zone to execute a prearranged scam with accomplices, having redistributed his excessive debts to gain entry. While confined, he mocks Kaiji and Ishida for their faith in altruism, praising instead Andō and Furuhata's pragmatic betrayal as natural survival strategy. Okabayashi escapes by concealing jewelry in a bandage, though Kaiji intercepts and claims these valuables at the last moment. This encounter reinforces Kaiji's realization that survival depends on self-reliance rather than trust.

=== Makoto Sahara ===
Voiced by: Masahiro Kōmoto (Japanese); Joe Daniels (English)
Portrayed by: Kenichi Matsuyama (live-action), Takuya Ayagiri (stage play)

Makoto Sahara (佐原 誠, Sahara Makoto) is Kaiji's coworker at a part-time job following the Espoir event. He shares Kaiji's lazy tendencies despite aspiring for success. Though typically talkative and carefree, he demonstrates unexpected mental resilience and physical ability during high-stakes competitions.

Sahara participates in Teiai's Human Derby gamble at Endō's request, winning the initial race. During the second stage, he overcomes hallucinations and fear to successfully cross the steel beam. However, he dies when struck by an artificially created wind gust, a concealed trap set by the organizers. Teiai officially reports his death as natural causes.

== Tobaku Hakairoku Kaiji / Kaiji: Against All Rules ==
=== Yoshihiro Kurosaki ===
Voiced by: Kenyu Horiuchi, Atsushi Miyauchi (Mr. Tonegawa: Middle Management Blues) (Japanese); Jovan Jackson (Mr. Tonegawa: Middle Management Blues) (English)
Portrayed by: Kyusaku Shimada (live-action, Kaiji 2), Kōtarō Yoshida (live-action, Kaiji: Final Game)

Yoshihiro Kurosaki (黒崎 義裕, Kurosaki Yoshihiro) is a high-ranking Teiai Group executive who becomes the organization's second-in-command after Tonegawa's dismissal. Though dismissive of Kaiji as a "stray dog", he acknowledges his gambling skills. Kurosaki demonstrates pragmatic leadership, occasionally showing concern for subordinates while maintaining strict control over Teiai's operations.

A family man with a wife and two children, Kurosaki struggles to connect with his introverted family. He dreams of traveling Japan after retirement. Spin-off media portray him as Tonegawa's straightforward rival and depict his occasional interactions with underground workers.

In the Final Game film adaptation, Kurosaki founds Japan's dominant temp agency, Goodwill Industries, before facing Kaiji in Teiai Land's "Last Judgment" game.

=== Tarō Ōtsuki ===
Voiced by: Chō (Japanese); Greg Cote (1-nichi Gaishutsuroku Hanchō) (English)
Portrayed by: Suzuki Matsuo (live-action)

Tarō Ōtsuki (大槻 太郎, Ōtsuki Tarō) is the foreman of Squad E in Teiai Group's underground labor camp, where Kaiji is assigned. While presenting himself as a helpful advisor to new prisoners, Ōtsuki secretly exploits them through illicit schemes. He maintains his privileged position by skimming profits from wage advances and luxury goods sales while organizing illegal gambling operations under the guise of stress relief.

Ōtsuki orchestrates a rigged Cee-lo game using altered dice that lack low numbers, collaborating with subordinates Isawa and Numakawa to systematically defraud prisoners. His long-term goal involves amassing 20 million perica—the underground currency—to purchase extended surface leave, though his intentions regarding permanent escape remain ambiguous.

Kaiji eventually exposes the scam after deducing the dice manipulation. With support from other prisoners and Teiai executives, he forces Ōtsuki into a high-stakes match using reverse-rigged dice that guarantee massive losses. Defeated and humiliated, Ōtsuki forfeits nearly his entire 17.7 million perica savings and loses his foreman position. Later, while watching Kaiji's televised challenge against the Bog, he angrily denounces him as a cheater.

The prequel spin-off manga 1-nichi Gaishutsuroku Hanchō depicts Ōtsuki's earlier life as a gourmet who frequently uses day passes to enjoy surface-world cuisine.

=== Kaoru Isawa ===
Voiced by: Yōichi Nishijima, Yoshitsugu Matsuoka (1-nichi Gaishutsuroku Hanchō) (Japanese); Kyle C. Jones (1-nichi Gaishutsuroku Hanchō) (English)
Portrayed by: Ryuji Sainei (live-action, Kaiji), Daisuke Kikuta (live-action, Kaiji 2)

Kaoru Isawa (石和 薫, Isawa Kaoru), also known as Kensuke Isawa (石和 謙介, Isawa Kensuke) in the live-action films, is Ōtsuki's close aide. He has an oppressive personality and harasses Kaiji and the Forty-fivers so that they cannot have dinner. He sits to Ōtsuki's left and uses the special dice when he and Numakawa work together in the Underground Cee-lo to pull off a 456-dice scam.

He also appears in 1-nichi Gaishutsuroku Hanchō, where he is depicted as enjoying going out for the day with Ōtsuki, and his given name is revealed there for the first time. He has a more feeble appearance in the live-action adaptation.

=== Takuya Numakawa ===
Voiced by: Chikara Ōsaka, Takuya Satō (1-nichi Gaishutsuroku Hanchō) (Japanese); Kregg Dailey (1-nichi Gaishutsuroku Hanchō) (English)

Takuya Numakawa (沼川 拓也, Numakawa Takuya) is Ōtsuki's close aide. He has long swept back hair and a mustache. He has a skeptical nature and is wary of Miyoshi's notes. He cannot use the special dice himself, as he serves the role of replacing them with the normal dice in Underground Cee-lo. As a result, he avoids playing big games with large sums of money and often refuses to play the no-limits games, falsely claiming that he is broke.

He also appears in 1-nichi Gaishutsuroku Hanchō, where he is depicted as enjoying going out for the day with Ōtsuki. Like Isawa, his given name is revealed in the spin-off. He also appears as the main character in 1-nichi Koshitsuroku Numakawa, a special one-shot in the first volume of the series.

=== Tomohiro Miyoshi ===
Voiced by: Kōji Yusa
Portrayed by: Shunya Shiraishi (live-action)

Tomohiro Miyoshi (三好 智広, Miyoshi Tomohiro) is a member of the "Forty-fivers", a group repaying debts through underground labor. His timid nature and gambling addiction lead Kaiji to consider him prone to failure. His meticulous record-keeping of cee-lo games, while personally unproductive, aids Kaiji in uncovering Ōtsuki's cheating. Miyoshi entrusts Kaiji with his 18 million perica winnings, enabling his escape after Kaiji defeats the Bog.

In later events, Miyoshi works at Takashi Muraoka's casino but accrues new debts. He attempts to deceive Kaiji into a partnership, believing Muraoka's false claim that Kaiji withheld Bog winnings.

=== Maeda ===
Voiced by: Masato Kaji

Maeda (前田) is a worker in group E and a member of the Forty-fivers along with Miyoshi. He is older than Kaiji and more short-tempered, and when he learns of Ōtsuki's cheating, he tries to attack him, but is stopped by Kaiji. He is later released from the underground with the rest of the Forty-fivers.

In Tobaku Datenroku Kaiji he works at Takashi Muraoka's casino with Miyoshi, but ends up in huge debts and offers Kaiji to partner up with them in a gamble.

=== Kitagawa ===
Voiced by: Tōru Nara

Kitagawa (北川) is a member of the Forty-fivers, a group of indebted laborers. Initially hesitant to join Kaiji's team due to his age, he ultimately participates after being persuaded by Kaiji. Following their victory in the cee-lo match against Ōtsuki, he commends Kaiji's compassionate leadership. His subsequent fate remains undisclosed.

=== Yokoi ===
Voiced by: Nobuaki Kanemitsu

Yokoi (横井) is one of the Forty-fivers. He has thick lips and was first seen drinking and eating while sitting next to Kaiji during Kaiji's first paycheck. His fate after being freed from the underground is unknown.

=== Hashimoto ===
Voiced by: Ichitarō Ai

Hashimoto (橋本) is one of the Forty-fivers. His hair is shaved like Maeda's. He was a little hesitant to join Kaiji's team to fight against Ōtsuki because he only contributed 1,300 perica, but Kaiji's words made him determined to join. His fate after being freed from the underground is unknown.

=== Hiromitsu Ishida ===
Voiced by: Kohsuke Toriumi
Portrayed by: Yuriko Yoshitaka (as Hiromi Ishida (石田 裕美, Ishida Hiromi)) (live-action)

Hiromitsu Ishida (石田 広光, Ishida Hiromitsu) is the indebted son of Kōji Ishida, consigned to underground labor for his gambling debts. He feigns illness to avoid work and initially resents his father's inability to help him. Kaiji, who witnessed Kōji's death, harshly reprimands Hiromitsu for this attitude. When Hiromitsu fails to fulfill his promise to repay his debts, Kaiji rescues him despite their conflict. Grateful, Hiromitsu vows to reform.

In the live-action film version, he was changed to a woman named Hiromi Ishida, a name that belonged to Ishida's wife in the original manga.

=== Odagiri ===
Voiced by: Kenichi Ono, Tomoaki Maeno (1-nichi Gaishutsuroku Hanchō) (Japanese); Chris Hutchison (1-nichi Gaishutsuroku Hanchō) (English)

Odagiri (小田切) is the foreman of Squad C in the underground kingdom, and is best friends with Squad B foreman Iwata and Squad A foreman Sakai. In the final battle between Kaiji and Ōtsuki, when Ōtsuki was caught cheating and tried to take away the evidence of the scam from Kaiji, he offered to examine the evidence and was neutral and calm throughout, acknowledging Kaiji's measures in response to the cheating based on the earlier interactions.

In 1-nichi Gaishutsuroku Hanchō, he appears as Ōtsuki's rival. He dreams of opening an underground cinema, and earns perica to pay for tablets and movie downloads to screen films underground.

=== Kōtarō Sakazaki ===
Voiced by: Issei Futamata
Portrayed by: Katsuhisa Namase (live-action)

Kōtarō Sakazaki (坂崎 孝太郎, Sakazaki Kōtarō) is Kaiji's collaborator in defeating the Bog. A former construction supervisor, he lost his job during an economic recession and subsequently squandered his savings on gambling, leading to his divorce. Living in poverty, he resolves to win ¥20 million to reunite with his family. Partnering with Kaiji, he succeeds and earns ¥150 million, vowing never to gamble again.

In later events, Sakazaki purchases a luxury home and briefly shelters Kaiji before dismissing him with ¥3 million, fearing his daughter Mikoko might develop an attachment to him.

=== Seiya Ichijō ===
Voiced by: Daisuke Namikawa (Japanese); Scott Gibbs (Mr. Tonegawa: Middle Management Blues) (English)
Portrayed by: Yūsuke Iseya (live-action)

Seiya Ichijō (一条 聖也, Ichijō Seiya) is the young manager of an underworld casino with an elaborate pachinko machine called "The Bog". Despite his youthful appearance and academic potential, personal circumstances prevented him from attending university, leading him to join the Teiai Group's casino operations. After seven years of service, he rises to become the casino's manager and a potential executive candidate under Kurosaki's mentorship.

Ambitious and resentful of former classmates who looked down on him, Ichijō endures Chairman Hyōdō's abuse while aspiring to become a Teiai executive. He demonstrates sharp perception by uncovering Sakazaki's deception and identifying Kaiji's traps that elude other staff members. Though critical of Hyōdō's character, he recognizes the truth in his worldview. After Kaiji defeats The Bog, Hyōdō sentences Ichijō to 1,050 years of underground labor as punishment for the casino's financial losses. As he is taken away, Kaiji challenges him to seek revenge, a promise Ichijō tearfully accepts.

The live-action adaptation expands Ichijō's backstory, revealing he became indebted after being tricked into cosigning a loan. As a survivor of the Brave Men Road gamble, he witnesses friends betraying each other, fostering his distrust of humanity.

== Tobaku Datenroku Kaiji ==
=== Takashi Muraoka ===
Takashi Muraoka (村岡 隆, Muraoka Takashi) is the president of a Teiai-affiliated underground casino and creator of the unconventional mahjong game "17 Steps". A ruthless pragmatist who values only monetary gain, he operates outside legal boundaries while resenting Teiai's financial demands. Risk-averse by nature, he employs coded signals from subordinates to guarantee victories, yet demonstrates unexpected strategic ability when cornered. Muraoka excels at psychological manipulation, turning Kaiji's allies against him through persuasion. His eventual defeat comes when Kaiji exploits his unwillingness to gamble without absolute advantage. He last appears in a desperate confrontation with his former associates, Miyoshi and Maeda.

=== Mikoko Sakazaki ===
Mikoko Sakazaki (坂崎 美心, Sakazaki Mikoko) is the daughter of Kōtarō Sakazaki, bearing a strong resemblance to her father. She develops romantic feelings for Kaiji, expressing them through overt gestures such as inviting him out or resting on his lap. During Kaiji's stay with the Sakazaki family, she occasionally provides him small sums of money, which he squanders on pachinko. Her latest appearance features her creating Ikaji, a manga loosely based on her relationship with Kaiji, demonstrating her understanding of his irresponsible nature while remaining oblivious to his true feelings.

=== Kazuya Hyōdō ===
Kazuya Hyōdō (兵藤 和也, Hyōdō Kazuya) is the second son of Teiai Group chairman Kazutaka Hyōdō. Known as "young master" within Teiai circles, his mixed heritage gives him a distinctive appearance with brown hair and sunglasses. While inheriting some of his father's sadistic tendencies, he demonstrates more complex personality traits, including a surprising capacity for fair judgment during games.

During the 17 Steps gambling event, he loans money to Kaiji while threatening severe consequences for non-payment, yet shows genuine admiration for Kaiji's strategies. His privileged upbringing has left him deeply cynical about human relationships, believing most people befriend him only for his family's status. This worldview leads him to create "Kazuya Produce", a series of lethal gambling scenarios designed to test human bonds, with outcomes serving as inspiration for his aspiring writing career.

His final appearance involves a high-stakes One Poker match against Kaiji, where he suffers defeat but survives the encounter.

=== Mario Garcia ===
Mario Garcia (マリオ) is a young Filipino who worked under Mitsuyama and is the youngest of the three, with his age being around 20. He participated in Kazuya's Salvation Game to help Mitsuyama pay off his debts. He comes from a family of scavengers at the bottom of the poverty line and made his living in the "Smoky Valley", a sea of garbage. He has an aversion to money after his older brother Antonio's incident, but also hopes to carve out a future for himself. After being betrayed and nearly killed by Mitsuyama, he became Kaiji's companion along with Chang, and together they set out to defeat Kazuya. He usually has a calm personality and can adjust to his surroundings despite having a bit of a weak side, but in the 2.4 Billion Escape Arc, he showed his courage and tact by snatching someone's bag on the spur of the moment in order to avoid being questioned by the police.

=== Chang Bowen ===
Chang Bowen (張 博文/チャン, Chan) is a young man coming from a poor rural area in China. Like Mario, he worked under Mitsuyama and participated in Kazuya's Salvation Game to help Mitsuyama pay off his debts. He was the second son, but due to the Chinese government's one-child policy, he was unregistered and led a working life without being treated as a human being. After being betrayed and almost killed by Mitsuyama, he became Kaiji's companion along with Mario, and together they set out to defeat Kazuya. He is normally calm and the more tactful of the three, but he sometimes becomes emotional and even gets into an argument with the blacksuit Takasaki during One Poker. In the 2.4 Billion Escape Arc, he is the only license carrier among the three, so he is the driver of the getaway car.

=== Mitsuyama ===
Mitsuyama (光山) is a middle-aged businessman and multiple debtor who employs Chang and Mario. Suffering from hepatitis B, he escapes underground labor when Kazuya purchases his debt for participation in the Salvation Game. His life experience makes him pragmatically accept compromises, including framing others. Though initially committed to teamwork, Kazuya's manipulations ultimately lead him to betray Chang and Mario, securing ¥70 million for himself. Later, during the 2.4 Billion Escape events, he attempts reconciliation by offering them money, but they reject both his gesture and his perceived hypocrisy.

=== Takeshi Arima ===
Takeshi Arima (有馬 猛, Arima Takeshi) is the owner of the "Center of the Earth" car dealership in Ibaraki Prefecture. He recalls how he used to be an office worker who endured continuous power harassment from his superiors, as well as experiencing a life of homelessness. Due to going through countless bitter moments in his life, he developed an eccentric personality. When Kaiji's group visits his store to rent a car and willingly offers 1.5 million yen for it, an amount of money that would let them purchase a car outright, he initially mistakes them for suicidal people, but supports them in their future and ends up lending them a camper van.

=== Hatsue Itō ===
Hatsue Itō (伊藤 初江, Itō Hatsue) is Kaiji's mother. She lives in an apartment complex and works part-time five times a week at a supermarket in the neighborhood. Her eyes look exactly like her son's, but she is a natural airhead. On the good side, she is good-natured, an aspect which has been passed down to Kaiji, but on the bad side, she is thoughtless and does not know how to be suspicious of people. She is a doting parent and sweet to Kaiji.

=== Tamotsu Takahashi ===
Tamotsu Takahashi (高橋 保, Takahashi Tamotsu) is Kaiji's childhood friend who went to the same elementary and middle school as him. He works as manager of a diner and is a serious young man who works overtime on his days off and commutes to work on his motorcycle.

=== Nanae Takahashi ===
Nanae Takahashi (高橋 奈々江, Takahashi Nanae) is Tamotsu's mother. When Kaiji escaped from the apartment complex, she acted as a decoy.

=== Nakasaka ===
Nakasaka (中阪) is a man Kaiji runs into at a bank in Ibaraki Prefecture during his "Nationwide Savings Trip". He is divorced, and shortly after his wife's divorce, he visited the bank to divide up his property. The flyer he received from Teiai revealed that the bounty was on Kaiji's group's head, and he later found out that they were hiding out in Ibaraki Prefecture when he reported the matter to Teiai, who then found out it was indeed Kaiji.

=== Hiroki Ishitaka ===
Hiroki Ishitaka (石高 浩貴, Ishitaka Hiroki) is a middle-aged man that Kaiji's group encounters at a motor home campground that they had chosen as a safe place to sleep during their "Nationwide Savings Trip." He and his friend Kizaki (木崎) invite Kaiji's group, who were holed up in the car, to have a drink. Afterwards, he helps Kaiji's group to fend off Inokuma's pursuit. He lives with his parents, who run a signboard shop, but they do not seem to get along very well with each other.

=== Takeshi Inokuma ===
Takeshi Inokuma (猪熊 武志, Inokuma Takeshi) is a Teiai debtor who drives a Mazda MX-5. He encounters Kaiji's group at a convenience store parking lot and, suspecting they match the description on Teiai's wanted notice, pursues their campervan.

== Kaiji: Final Game ==
=== Kanako Kirino ===
Portrayed by: Nagisa Sekimizu

Kanako Kirino (桐野 加奈子, Kirino Kanako) is one of the main characters in the film. She was the winner of the second relief event in Osaka and is a self-proclaimed "lucky girl" who was recruited by Tōgō for her luck. She is younger than Kaiji, but speaks to him informally.

=== Kōsuke Takakura ===
Portrayed by: Sota Fukushi

Kōsuke Takakura (高倉 浩介, Takakura Kōsuke) is the largest enemy in the film. A former bureaucrat in the Ministry of Economy, Trade and Industry, he currently serves as Principal Secretary to the Prime Minister and is known as "Shadow Prime Minister". His "Gold Rock-Paper-Scissors" game played for entertainment purpose is well known among those in power. To stop Japan's rapid economic decline, he plans to implement a "deposit blockade" and use the people's assets to offset the national debt.

=== Minato Hirose ===
Portrayed by: Mackenyu

Minato Hirose (廣瀬 湊, Hirose Minato) is Tōgō's secretary and one of the main characters in the film. He has been Tōgō's secretary for three years and asks Kaiji and Kanako to help him gamble with his plan to save Japan, as Tōgō has little time left to live.

=== Shigeru Tōgō ===
Portrayed by: Masatō Ibu

Shigeru Tōgō (東郷 滋, Tōgō Shigeru) is a man who has been called "Japan's Real Estate King." He has a fortune of 50 billion yen, but with little time left to live, he wanted to serve Japan as much as possible in his remaining life span, so he held a relief event. After leaving his wife he got a lover, but one day he suddenly abandoned her and her son. He learns that the government is about to implement a "deposit blockade" and asks Kaiji and Kanako, the winners of the relief event, to help him gamble in order to stop it.
