= Eva Kail =

Austrian urban planner

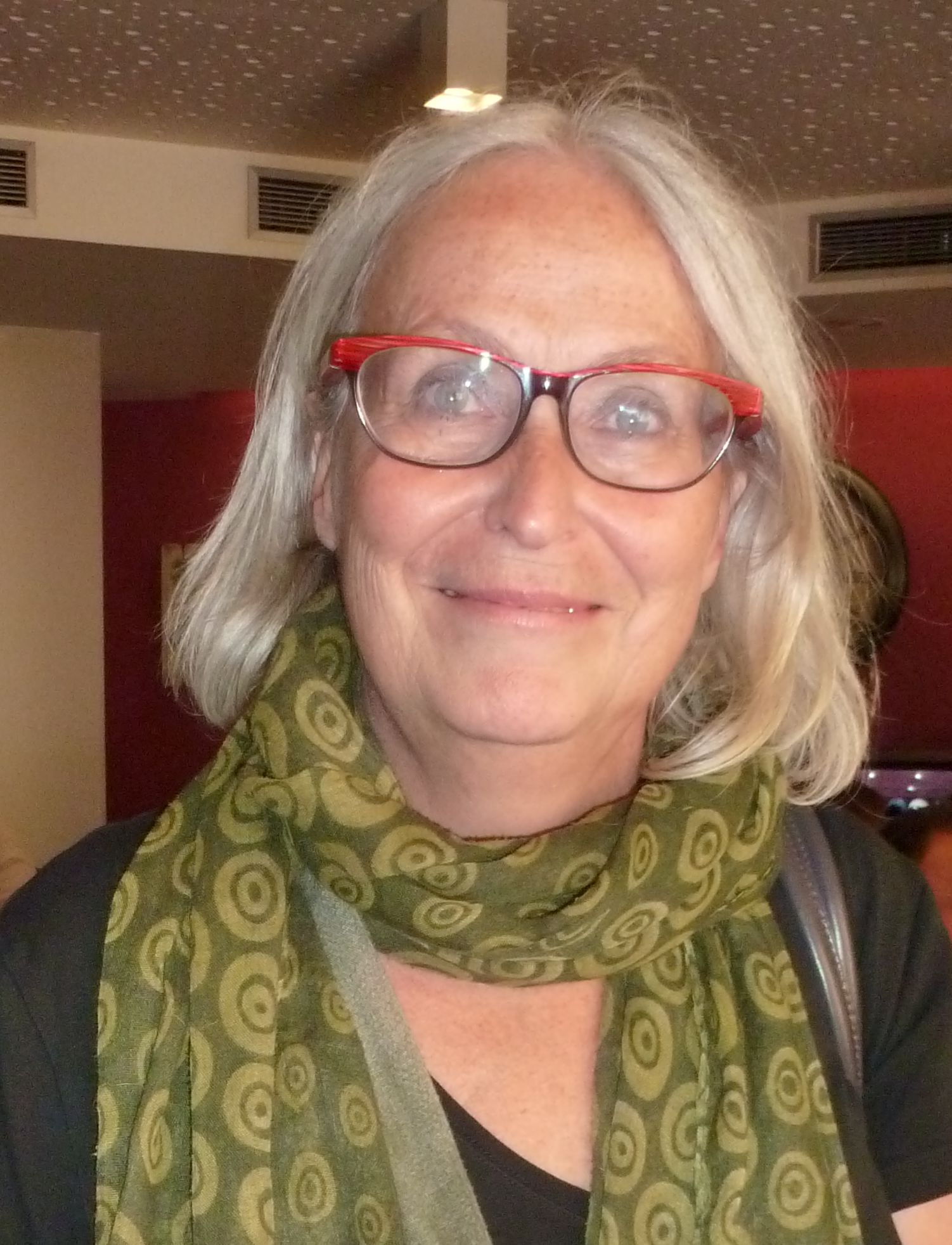
- Education: Technical University of Vienna
- Occupation: Urban planner
- Known for: Gender mainstreaming in design

Eva Kail is a Vienna-based urban planner who has popularized gender mainstreaming in city design and contributed to more than 60 projects related to gender equality in housing, transportation, planning, and design of public spaces.

== Career ==
Kail served as the head of Vienna's first women's office, the Frauenburo, which was established after a 1991 photography exhibit organized by Kail called Who Owns the Public Space. The exhibition featured works about the lived experiences of eight women of varying ages and abilities over the course of a single day. It led to broader conversations about how many European cities, including Vienna, had been designed primarily with male commuters in mind and could subsequently fail to meet women's needs; in 1992, Kail became head of the Frauenburo.

One of Kail's first projects involved inviting women to submit bids for a 357-unit complex, the Women-Work-City, or Frauen-Werk-Stadt; the women-designed project was completed in 1997 and included numerous design features intended to address women's needs, such as storage for strollers, wide stairwells, and a building height low enough to ensure residents could see the street. Additionally, the complex was located near public transit and had a kindergarten on-site, meaning children could attend classes without needing parental accompaniment for long distances; medical and commercial spaces also exist within the complex.

The Frauen-Werk-Stadt functioned as a proof of concept for the applications of gender mainstreaming in urban planning, and from 2002 to 2006 Kail was able to work on a pilot in the neighborhood of Mariahilf, with 28,000 residents. This work included improving street lighting, prioritizing pedestrians, installing new seating, widening pavement, and removing barriers to ease passage of strollers, wheelchair users, and the elderly. Gender mainstreaming also influenced park redesigns, after Vienna's parks department found that girls' usage of parks dropped off after the age of nine; this led planners to make improvements such as dedicated areas for volleyball and badminton, increased lighting, and seating areas.

Speaking to the CBC about the political aspect of gender mainstreaming and urban design, Kail said, "If you are using public space, you are also becoming a public person. In Europe, starting with Greek democracy, all the revolutions started in public places. Political history is always connected with specific spots in city. To be able to be in the city, in the way you want to be, shows in a really clear way what your chances in society are.”
