= Kali Nikitas =

American graphic designer

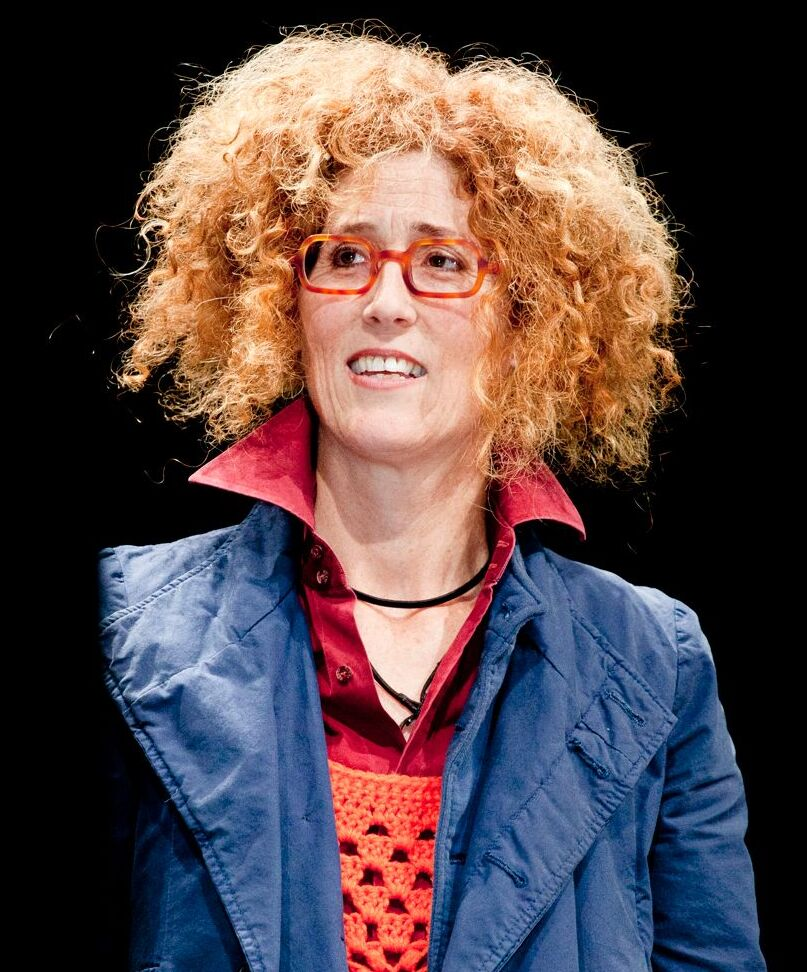
- Nikitas at the TYPO International Design Talks, San Francisco (2012)
- Born: 1964 (age 61–62); Chicago, Illinois, U.S.
- Education: University of Illinois Chicago, California Institute of the Arts
- Occupations: Academic administrator; curator; graphic designer
- Political party: Democrat
- Website: www.kalinikitas.com

Kali Nikitas (born 1964) is an American academic administrator, curator, graphic designer, and educator.

== Early life ==
Kali Nikitas was born in 1964 in Chicago, Illinois. She received an MFA degree from California Institute of the Arts (CalArts) in graphic design; and a BFA in graphic design from the University of Illinois Chicago.

== Career ==
She is an academic administrator, graphic designer, event curator, and talent scout.

Nikitas was most recently a faculty member at the USC Roski School of Art & Design. Before USC, Nikitas was the head of the graphic design and illustration (BFA) and MFA graphic design departments at Otis College of Art and Design in Los Angeles.

She taught and or worked in academic administration at Northeastern University, Minneapolis College of Art and Design and The School of the Art Institute of Chicago.

She partners with Stephan Jones Studio on exhibition, pop-up events and independently curates unique events that center around culture, design and sometimes food.

She sits on the Alumni Council for her alma mater CalArts, and is active with the art and design community in Inglewood, CA.

Nikitas curated international design exhibitions: "And She Told 2Friends: An International Exhibition of Graphic Design by Women" and "Soul Design" and facilitated Typo Berlin and Typo San Francisco. She has hosted workshops and special events in the States and abroad. The work generated in her then studio, Graphic Design for Love (+$) was recognized in numerous publications and competitions such as: Emigre, Eye, I.D. and the AIGA Journal American Center for Design, AIGA and the Type Directors Club.

== Personal ==
Nikitas married artist Richard M. Shelton, director of the Creative Action Program at Otis College of Art and Design. They live in Inglewood, California.
