= 2026 Unity Cup =

Tournament details
- Host country: England
- City: London
- Dates: 26 – 30 May
- Teams: 4
- Venue: The Valley

Final positions
- Champions: Nigeria (4th title)
- Runners-up: Jamaica
- Third place: Zimbabwe
- Fourth place: India

Tournament statistics
- Matches played: 4
- Goals scored: 8 (2 per match)
- Top scorer(s): (Nigeria) Femi Azeez (Nigeria) Alhassan Yusuf (2 goals each)

The 2026 Unity Cup was the fourth edition of the Unity Cup, an international football tournament held in London, England. The tournament took place between 26 and 30 May, featuring the national teams of India, Jamaica, Nigeria and Zimbabwe. It was held at The Valley in Charlton, south-east London. The stadium previously held the 2004 edition of the tournament.

Nigeria were the defending champions. On 30 May 2026, Nigeria defeated Jamaica 3–0 and retained the cup consecutively for the fourth time since its inception in 2002.

== Participating teams ==
Country	Confederation	FIFA Ranking (April 2026)	Previous best performance
India	AFC	136	4th (2026)
Jamaica	CONCACAF	71	Runners-up (2002, 2025, 2026)
Nigeria	CAF	26	Champions (2002, 2004, 2025, 2026)
Zimbabwe	CAF	130	3rd (2026)

== Squads ==
The following squads were announced for the tournament:

India	Jamaica	Nigeria	Zimbabwe
Goalkeepers: Gurpreet Singh Sandhu (captain); Albino Gomes; Hrithik Tiwari; Defenders: Sandesh Jhingan; Rahul Bheke; Akash Mishra; Nikhil Poojary; Roshan Singh; Bijoy Varghese; Pramveer Singh; Nikhil Barla; Midfielders: Jeakson Singh; Noufal PN; Ricky Shabong; Macarton Nickson; Forwards: Lallianzuala Chhangte; Farukh Choudhary; Rahim Ali; Edmund Lalrindika; Ryan Williams; Vikram Partap Singh; Mohammed Sanan; Coach: (India) Khalid Jamil	Goalkeepers: Coniah Boyce-Clarke; Tafari Chambers; Joshua Grant; Defenders: Damion Lowe; Dexter Lembikisa; Joel Latibeaudiere; Ronaldo Webster; Christopher Ainsworth; Jeovanni Laing; Odin Samuels-Smith; Marlon van de Wetering; Midfielders: Isaac Hayden; Brandon Cover Tyrese Hall; Courtney Clarke; Forwards: Kaheim Dixon; Bailey Cadamarteri; Dajaune Brown; Caelan Cadamarteri; Raheem Edwards; Nickalia Fuller; Dwight Merrick; Nicholas Simmonds; Coach: (Jamaica) Errol Stevens	Goalkeepers: Francis Uzoho; Michael Atata; Arthur Okonkwo; Defenders: Tijani Al Ameen; Igoh Ogbu; Chibuike Nwaiwu; Elias Ochobi; Kenneth Igboke; Chibueze Oputa; Midfielders: Alhassan Yusuf; Tochukwu Nnadi; Samson Tijani; Aderemi Adeoye; Ayobami Junior; Tosin Oyedokun; Forwards: Terem Moffi; Philip Otele; Femi Azeez; Rafiu Durosinmi; Owen Oseni; Coach: (France) Éric Chelle	Goalkeepers: Elvis Chipezeze; Marley Tavaziva; Future Sibanda; Defenders: Gerald Takwara; Jordan Zemura; Emmanuel Jalai; Munashe Garananga; Isheanesu Mauchi; Sean Fusire; Shane Maroodza; Corbin Mthunzi; Midfielders: Marshall Munetsi; Marvelous Nakamba; Tawanda Chirewa; Jonah Fabisch; Prosper Padera; Mongameli Tshuma; Abubakar Moffat; Forwards: Prince Dube; Tawanda Maswanhise; Daniel Msendami; Washington Navaya; Junior Zindoga; Coach: (Zimbabwe) Kaitano Tembo

== Venue ==
- All matches were held at The Valley, Charlton, London, England.

London	2026 Unity Cup (England)
The Valley	2026 Unity Cup (England)
51°29′11″N 0°2′11″W	2026 Unity Cup (England)
Capacity: 27,111	2026 Unity Cup (England)

== Matches ==
=== Bracket ===
Semi-finals
26 May – The Valley
Nigeria	2
Zimbabwe	0
27 May – The Valley
India	0
Jamaica	2

Final
30 May – The Valley
Nigeria	3
Jamaica	0
Third place play-off
30 May – The Valley
Zimbabwe	1
India	0

=== Semi-finals ===
26 May 2026
19:30

Nigeria	2–0	Zimbabwe
Azeez 5', 63'	Report

The Valley, London
Attendance: 27,000
Referee: John Brooks (England)
27 May 2026
19:30

India	0–2	Jamaica
	Report	Clarke 8'; Dixon 78'

The Valley, London
Referee: Darren England (England)

=== Third place play-off ===
30 May 2026
14:30

Zimbabwe	1–0	India
Dube 34' (pen.)	Report

The Valley, London
Referee: Andrew Madley (England)

=== Final ===
30 May 2026
19:30

Nigeria	3–0	Jamaica
Yusuf 3', 90+1'; Moffi 59'	Report

The Valley, London
Referee: Sam Barrott (England)

== Winners ==
2026 Unity Cup winners

Nigeria
Fourth title

== Goalscorers ==
There were 8 goals scored in 4 matches, for an average of 2 goals per match.

2 goals

- (Nigeria) Femi Azeez
- (Nigeria) Alhassan Yusuf

1 goal

- (Jamaica) Courtney Clarke
- (Jamaica) Kaheim Dixon
- (Nigeria) Terem Moffi
- (Zimbabwe) Prince Dube

== Broadcasting rights ==
Broadcaster	Type	Region	Ref.
FanCode	Live stream on App & Website	Global	
Krafty Entertainment	TV Broadcasting	United Kingdom	
DAZN	Live stream on App & Website (final day only)	United Kingdom	
talkSPORT	Live stream on YouTube (final day only)	United Kingdom	

== See also ==
- 2026 FIFA Series
- 2026 Tri-Nation Series
