= Michael Atata =

Nigeria Professional Footballer

Personal information
- Full name: Michael Atata
- Position: Goalkeeper

Team information
- Current team: Ikorodu City
- Number: 34

Senior career*
| Years | Team | Apps | (Gls) |
| 2025– | Ikorodu City | 32 | (0) |

International career^{‡}
| 2026– | Nigeria | 0 | (0) |
- * Club domestic league appearances and goals as of 29 May 2026 ‡ National team caps and goals as of 30 May 2026

Michael Atata is a Nigerian professional footballer who plays as a goalkeeper for Ikorodu City F.C in the Nigeria Premier Football League (NPFL) and received his first call-up to the Nigeria national football team in 2026.

== Club career ==
Atata plays for Ikorodu City in the Nigeria Premier Football League. During the 2025–26 season, he recorded 16 clean sheets, the highest total in the NPFL which also included six in his first ten league appearances for Ikorodu F.C.

== International career ==
In May 2026, Atata received his maiden call-up to the Nigeria national football team by head coach Eric Chelle for the 2026 Unity Cup in London. He was one of the nine home-based players selected for the tournament and joined the squad alongside goalkeepers Arthur Okonkwo and Francis Uzoho.
