= Corbin Mthunzi =

Zimbabwean footballer (born 2007)

Personal information
- Full name: Corbin Sipho Mthunzi
- Date of birth: 7 May 2007 (age 19)
- Place of birth: Colchester, England
- Height: 1.83 m (6 ft 0 in)
- Position: Centre-back

Team information
- Current team: Ipswich Town

Youth career
- 2023–2025: Brighton & Hove Albion
- 2025–: Ipswich Town

Senior career*
Years	Team	Apps	(Gls)
2026–	Ipswich Town	0	(0)

International career^{‡}
2022	England U15	2	(0)
2026–	Zimbabwe	3	(0)
- * Club domestic league appearances and goals as of 23:20, 31 May 2026 (UTC) ‡ National team caps and goals as of 23:20, 31 May 2026 (UTC)

Corbin Sipho Mthunzi (born 7 May 2007) is a professional footballer who plays as a centre-back for Premier League club Ipswich Town. Born in England, he plays for the Zimbabwe national team.

== Club career ==
Mthunzi joined Brighton & Hove Albion's academy in the summer of 2023, featuring regularly for their Under-18s side. He departed Brighton at the end of the 2024–25 season and joined Ipswich Town following a successful trial period, impressing the club's coaching staff with his composure and maturity. He featured for Ipswich Town Under-21s in matches against QPR and Chelsea during his trial.

On 12 April 2025, Mthunzi signed a two-year professional contract with Ipswich Town, with the deal commencing on 1 July 2025 and running until June 2027.

== International career ==
Mthunzi was born in England to a Zimbabwean father and English mother. He represented England at under-15 and under-16 levels before switching international allegiance to Zimbabwe, the country of his father's heritage. In May 2026, he was named in the Zimbabwe senior squad for the 2026 Unity Cup tournament in London, earning his first senior cap against Nigeria at The Valley, in Charlton.

== Honours ==
Zimbabwe

- Unity Cup third place: 2026
