= Chibueze Oputa =

Nigerian professional footballer

Oputa Chibueze Calistus
Personal information
- Full name: Oputa Chibueze Calistus
- Date of birth: 17 October 2005 (age 21)
- Place of birth: Ozubulu, Anambra State, Nigeria
- Position: Right-back

Team information
- Current team: Rangers International

Senior career*
Years	Team	Apps	(Gls)
?–2025	Solution		
2025–	Rangers International	29	(0)

International career^{‡}
2026–	Nigeria	2	(0)
- * Club domestic league appearances and goals as of 27 May 2026 ‡ National team caps and goals as of 30 May 2026

Oputa Chibueze Calistus (born 17 October 2005) is a Nigerian professional footballer who plays as a right-back for Rangers International and the Nigeria national team.

Born in Ozubulu, Anambra State, Nigeria, Oputa began his career with Solution F.C. before joining Rangers International F.C. in 2025.

During the 2025–26 season, he featured for Rangers International in the Nigeria Premier Football League (NPFL) as the club won the league title. He made 29 league appearances and recorded six assists during the campaign.

Oputa also featured in domestic cup competitions, including the Enugu State FA Cup with Rangers International and the Anambra State FA Cup during his time with Solution F.C..

In May 2026, he received his first senior call-up to the Nigeria national football team for the 2026 Unity Cup tournament in London.

He made his senior international debut on 26 May 2026 in a 2–0 victory over Zimbabwe in the Unity Cup.

== Playing style ==
Oputa plays primarily as a right-back and contributes in both defensive and attacking phases of play. He is involved in overlapping runs, wide attacking movements, and set-piece situations.

== Honours ==
Rangers International F.C.

- Nigeria Premier Football League: 2025–26
- Unity Cup : 2026
- Enugu State FA Cup: 2026

Solution F.C.

- Anambra State FA Cup: 2024

== Career ==
In 2025, Oputa was transferred from Nigeria National League club, Solution FC. to Rangers International in the Nigeria Premier Football League (NPFL). During the 2025–26 season, he was one of the club's standout performers that contributed to the club's successful title challenge and eventual league triumph

== International career ==
In May 2026, Oputa received his maiden invitation to the senior Nigeria national team, the Super Eagles, after being named in head coach Eric Chelle's squad for the 2026 Unity Cup. He was among seven NPFL players selected for the tournament.

Following this selection, Oputa expressed gratitude to the Nigeria Football Federation and described the invitation as an opportunity to make Nigeria proud.

He subsequently joined the Super Eagles training camp in London ahead of Nigeria's Unity Cup fixture against Zimbabwe.
