= Aderemi Adeoye =

Nigeria Professional Footballer

Personal information
- Full name: Aderemi Adeoye
- Date of birth: 29 January 2007 (age 19)
- Place of birth: Nigeria
- Position: Midfielder

Team information
- Current team: Ikorodu City

Senior career*
Years	Team	Apps	(Gls)
2026–	Ikorodu City	9	(1)

International career^{‡}
2026–	Nigeria	3	(0)
- * Club domestic league appearances and goals as of 30 May 2026 ‡ National team caps and goals as of 6 October 2026

Aderemi Adeoye (born 29 January 2007) is a Nigerian professional footballer who plays as a midfielder for Ikorodu City F.C. and the Nigeria national team.

== Club career ==
Adeoye joined the Ikorodu City in second half of the 2025–26 Nigeria Premier Football League season on a free agent].

== International career ==
In May 2026, Adeoye received his first call-up to the Nigeria national team after being selected by head coach Eric Chelle for the 2026 Unity Cup in London. He made his senior international debut for Nigeria in the Unity Cup semi-final against Zimbabwe on 26 May 2026 as a substitute.
