= Marlon van de Wetering =

Footballer (born 2007)

Personal information
- Date of birth: 26 November 2007 (age 18)
- Place of birth: 's-Hertogenbosch, Netherlands
- Position: Right-back

Team information
- Current team: Excelsior
- Number: 25

Youth career
- Nivo Sparta
- 2023–2025: FC Eindhoven

Senior career*
Years	Team	Apps	(Gls)
2025–2026	FC Eindhoven	18	(1)
2026–	Excelsior	0	(0)

International career^{‡}
2026	Jamaica U20	5	(0)
2026–	Jamaica	1	(0)
- * Club domestic league appearances and goals as of 1 July 2026 ‡ National team caps and goals as of 30 May 2026

Marlon van de Wetering (born 26 November 2007) is a professional footballer who plays as a right-back for Eredivisie club Excelsior. Born in the Netherlands, he plays for the Jamaica national team.

== Club career ==
A former youth academy player of Nivo Sparta, van de Wetering joined FC Eindhoven in 2023. He made his senior team debut for Eindhoven on 8 August 2025 in a 1–0 league win over Jong Utrecht. Nine days later, on 17 August, he scored his first goal in a 1–0 win against Willem II. After several appearances as a second-half substitute, he made his first start for the club on 30 January 2026 in a 5–0 win over MVV Maastricht.

On 19 June 2026, van de Wetering joined Excelsior on a three-year contract until June 2029.

== International career ==
=== Youth ===
In February 2026, van de Wetering was called up to the Jamaica national under-20 team for the 2026 CONCACAF U-20 Championship qualifying tournament. He played all five matches in the tournament, helping Jamaica qualify for the 2026 CONCACAF U-20 Championship.

=== Senior ===
In May 2026, van de Wetering received his first call-up to the Jamaica national team, being named in the squad for the 2026 Unity Cup. He made his debut on 30 May 2026 in a 3–0 loss to Nigeria.

== Personal life ==
Van de Wetering was born in the Netherlands to a Dutch-Greek father and a Jamaican mother.

== Career statistics ==
=== Club ===
As of match played 24 April 2026

Appearances and goals by club, season and competition
Club	Season	League			National cup		Total	
Club	Season	Division	Apps	Goals	Apps	Goals	Apps	Goals
FC Eindhoven	2025–26	Eerste Divisie	18	1	0	0	18	1
Excelsior	2026–27	Eredivisie	0	0	0	0	0	0
Career total			18	1	0	0	18	1

=== International ===
As of match played 30 May 2026

Appearances and goals by national team and year
National team	Year	Apps	Goals
Jamaica	2026	1	0
Total		1	0
