= Ochobi Elias =

Nigerian footballer

Personal information
- Full name: Ochobi Elias
- Date of birth: 25 December 2007 (age 18)
- Position: Left-back

Team information
- Current team: Rivers United
- Number: 36

Senior career*
Years	Team	Apps	(Gls)
2024–	Rivers United	33	(0)

International career^{‡}
2026–	Nigeria	0	(0)
- * Club domestic league appearances and goals as of 29 May 2026 ‡ National team caps and goals as of 29 May 2026

Ochobi Elias (born 25 December 2007) is a Nigerian professional footballer who plays as a left-back for Rivers United. He received his first call-up to the Nigeria national team in 2026 for the Unity Cup tournament.

== Club career ==
Elias started his career at the Rivers United Youth team where he won the 2024 NPFL Youth League trophy. He was promoted to the senior team in 2024.

== International career ==
In May 2026, Elias received his maiden invitation to the Nigeria national team after being named in head coach Éric Chelle's squad for the 2026 Unity Cup.
