= Kenneth Igboke =

Nigerian footballer

Personal information
- Full name: Kenneth Obinna Igboke
- Date of birth: 27 July 2005 (age 21)
- Place of birth: Enugu, Nigeria
- Height: 1.76 m (5 ft 9 in)
- Position: Left-back

Team information
- Current team: Rangers International
- Number: 3

Senior career*
Years	Team	Apps	(Gls)
2022–	Rangers International	61	(4)

International career^{‡}
2026–	Nigeria	2	(0)
- * Club domestic league appearances and goals as of 30 May 2026 ‡ National team caps and goals as of 30 May 2026

Kenneth Obinna Igboke (born 27 July 2005) is a Nigerian professional footballer who plays as a left-back for Nigeria Premier Football League club Rangers International and the Nigeria national team.

== Early life ==
Igboke is from Nsukka in Enugu. He was discovered by coaches of Rangers International's feeder team while playing football in the streets of Nsukka, Enugu State, before progressing through the club's youth system.

== Club career ==
=== Rangers International ===
Igboke began his senior career with Rangers International, breaking into the first team during the 2022–23 NPFL season

== International career ==
In May 2024, Igboke received his first call-up to the Nigeria national team (Super Eagles) for international fixtures after scoring three goals and providing one assist, though he did not make his debut. In May 2026, he was also invited by Eric Chelle to the Unity Cup, where he made his debut for the Super Eagles of Nigeria.

== Honours ==
Rangers International

- Nigeria Premier Football League: 2023–24, 2025–26
