= Adewale Adegoke =

Nigerian football manager

Personal information
- Place of birth: Nigeria

Managerial career
- Years: Team
- 1950–1952: Nigeria

Adewale Adegoke was a Nigerian football manager who coached Nigeria national team from 1950 to 1952. He was the second ever manager for the Nigerian national team, and the first Nigerian who managed to do so.
