= Alhassan Yusuf =

Nigerian footballer (born 2000)

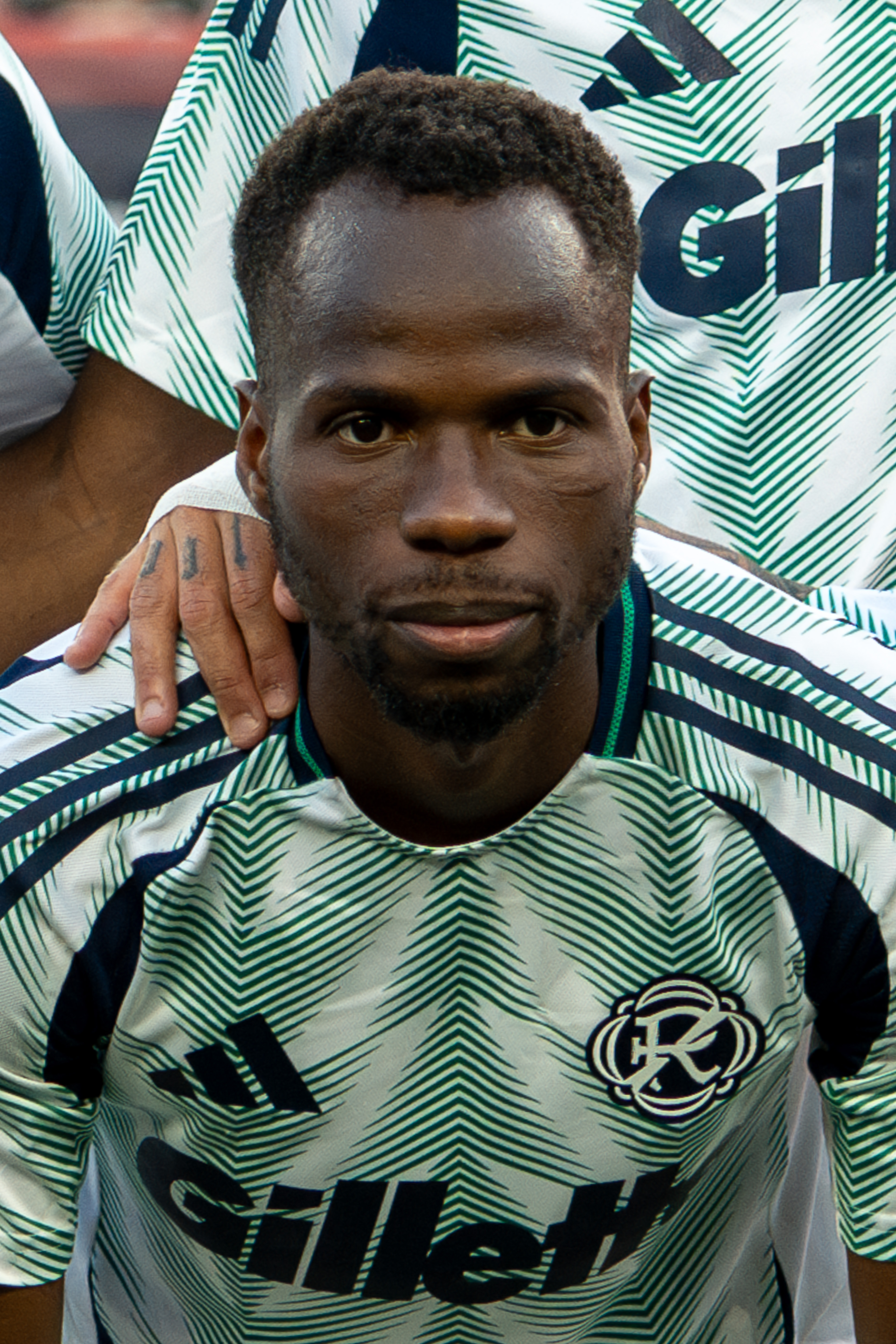
- Yusuf with the New England Revolution in 2025

Personal information
- Full name: Alhassan Yusuf Abdullahi Pigui
- Date of birth: 20 July 2000 (age 26)
- Place of birth: Kano, Nigeria
- Height: 1.75 m (5 ft 9 in)
- Position: Midfielder

Team information
- Current team: New England Revolution
- Number: 80

Youth career
- –2018: FC Hearts Nigeria

Senior career*
Years	Team	Apps	(Gls)
2018–2021	IFK Göteborg	66	(2)
2021–2024	Royal Antwerp	90	(3)
2023	Young Reds Antwerp	2	(0)
2024–	New England Revolution	61	(7)

International career^{‡}
2024–	Nigeria	13	(3)
Medal record
Men's football
Representing Nigeria
Africa Cup of Nations
Runner-up	2023 Ivory Coast
- * Club domestic league appearances and goals as of 19 August 2026 ‡ National team caps and goals as of 17 November 2026

Alhassan Yusuf Abdullahi Pigui MON (born 20 July 2000) is a Nigerian professional footballer who plays as a midfielder for Major League Soccer club New England Revolution and the Nigeria national team.

== The starts ==
Alhassan Yusuf arrived in Sweden to participate in a Scandinavian youth cup Gothia cup with tiki-taka academy and after an excellent performance he earned a professional contract with IFK Göteborg.

== Club career ==
=== IFK Göteborg ===
From 2018 to 2021, Yusuf played for Allsvenskan club IFK Göteborg.

=== Antwerp ===
On 16 July 2021, Belgian club Antwerp announced that they had reached an oral agreement with IFK Göteborg over the transfer of Yusuf.

Yusuf won the Belgian league and cup double with Royal Antwerp in 2022-23, first seeing off Mechelen 2–0 in the 2023 Belgian Cup final, before edging out Racing Genk on the final day of the league season, drawing 2–2 away to their title rivals thanks to a 94th-minute equaliser from captain Toby Alderweireld.

It was Antwerp's first league crown in 66 years, having last lifted the title in 1957.

=== New England Revolution ===
On 12 August 2024, Yusuf signed a contract with New England Revolution through the 2027 season, with a club option for the 2028 season. His transfer fee was officially undisclosed, but reportedly between $2–3 million. The Revolution were able to add Yusuf via MLS' “season-ending injury replacement mechanism;" given the club's loss of Tomás Chancalay, who was sidelined in June with a torn ACL. Yusuf made his MLS debut on 14 September against Orlando City, coming on as a substitute for Ian Harkes in the 72nd minute. He made his first start for the Revolution the following week on 21 September against Charlotte FC, playing 75 minutes. On 28 September, Yusuf played his first full match for the Revolution, and recorded his first assist for the club, setting up Brandon Bye's 86th-minute game-winning goal in a 1–0 victory over Nashville SC. On 19 August 2026, Yusuf scored a hat-trick in the Revolution's 3–0 win over D.C. United.

== International career ==
Yusuf made the final squad for the Nigeria national team for the 2023 Africa Cup of Nations in Ivory Coast. He made his AFCON debut against Equatorial Guinea on January 14, 2024 which ended in a 1–1 draw. He was substituted off in the 69th minute of the game after sustaining an injury.

== Career statistics ==
=== International ===
As of match played 17 November 2026

Appearances and goals by national team and year
National team	Year	Apps	Goals
Nigeria	2024	8	0
Nigeria	2025	1	0
Nigeria	2026	4	3
Total		13	3

Scores and results list Nigeria's goal tally first, score column indicates score after each Yusuf goal.

List of international goals scored by Alhassan Yusuf
No.	Date	Venue	Opponent	Score	Result	Competition
1	30 May 2026	The Valley, London, England	Jamaica	1–0	3–0	2026 Unity Cup
2	30 May 2026	The Valley, London, England	Jamaica	3–0	3–0	2026 Unity Cup
3	13 November 2026	Godswill Akpabio International Stadium, Uyo, Nigeria	Tanzania	1–0	3–1	2027 Africa Cup of Nations qualification

== Honours ==
IFK Göteborg

- Svenska Cupen: 2019–20

Royal Antwerp

- Belgian Pro League: 2022–23
- Belgian Cup: 2022–23
- Belgian Super Cup: 2023

Nigeria

- Africa Cup of Nations runner-up: 2023

Individual

- Allsvenskan Newcomer of the year: 2019

Orders

- Member of the Order of the Niger
