= Tosin Oyedokun =

Nigeria Professional Footballer

Personal information
- Full name: Tosin Oyedokun
- Date of birth: 23 July 2002 (age 24)
- Position: Central midfielder

Team information
- Current team: Ikorodu City
- Number: 10

Senior career*
Years	Team	Apps	(Gls)
2023–	Ikorodu City	63	(11)

International career^{‡}
2026–	Nigeria	2	(0)
- * Club domestic league appearances and goals as of 30 May 2026 ‡ National team caps and goals as of 30 May 2026

Tosin Oyedokun (born 23 July 2002) is a Nigerian professional footballer who plays as a central midfielder for Ikorodu City F.C. and the Nigeria national team.

== Club career ==
Oyedokun plays for Ikorodu City F.C. in the Nigeria Premier Football League(NPFL). In the 2025/2026 season, he served as the captain and he scored four goals and contributed four assists. In April 2026, he scored in a league match against Warri Wolves as Ikorodu City continued its push for a top-three finish in the NPFL

== International career ==
In May 2026, Oyedokun received his first call-up to the Nigeria national team after being named in head coach Eric Chelle's squad for the Unity Cup tournament in London.
