= 2004 Unity Cup =

Coordinates: 51°29′11″N 0°02′11″E

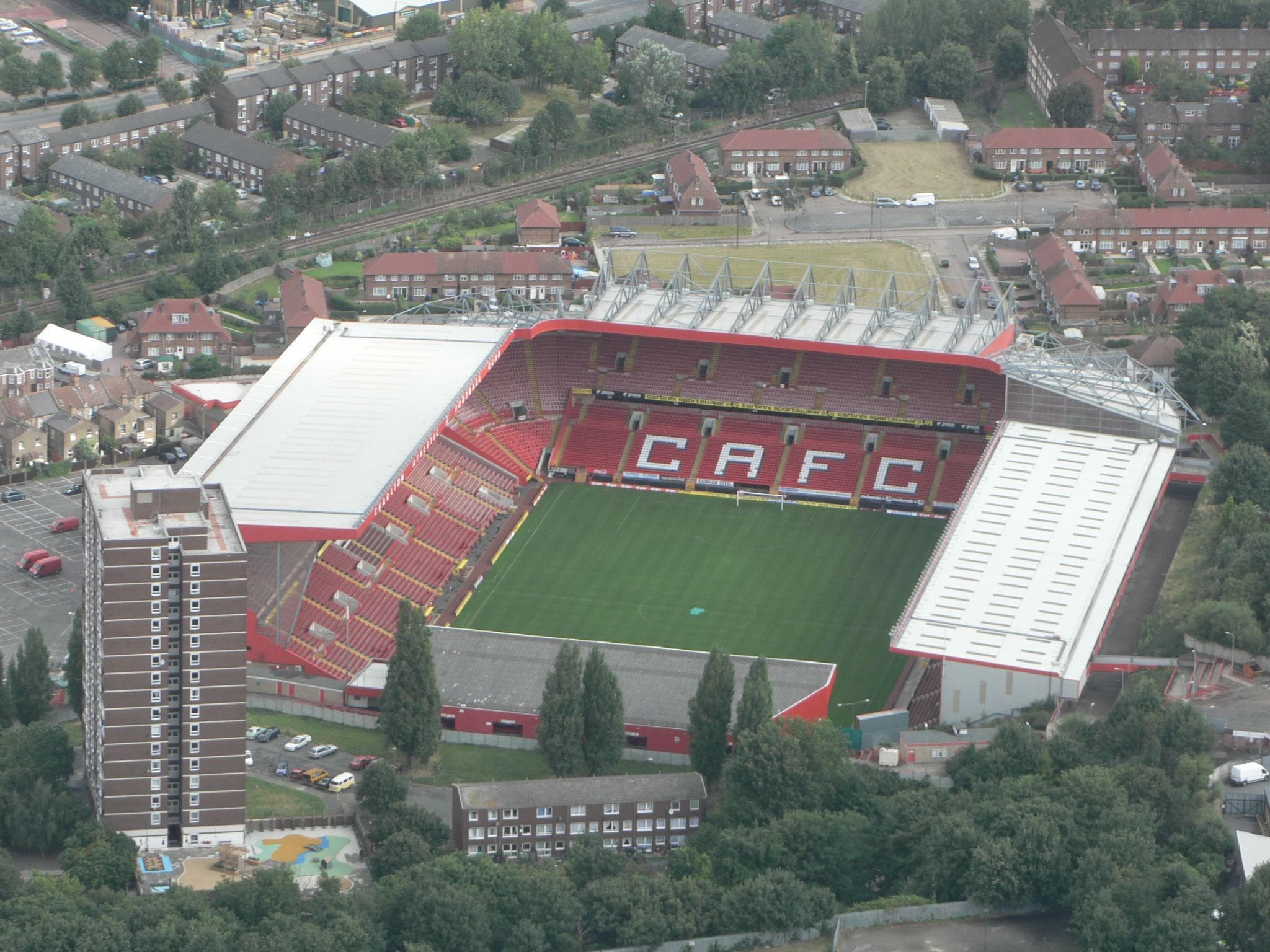
- The Valley Stadium hosted the tournament

Tournament details
- Host country: England
- City: London
- Dates: 29 May – 2 June
- Teams: 3
- Venue: The Valley

Final positions
- Champions: Nigeria (2nd title)
- Runners-up: Republic of Ireland
- Third place: Jamaica

Tournament statistics
- Matches played: 3
- Goals scored: 6 (2 per match)
- Top scorer(s): (Nigeria) Bartholomew Ogbeche (3 goals)

The 2004 Unity Cup was the second edition of the Unity Cup, an international football tournament held in May and June at The Valley Stadium in London, England. Nigeria, Jamaica and the Republic of Ireland were the competing sides. Nigeria won the competition with the Republic of Ireland finishing second. The competitors were countries with large diasporas in London.

== Results ==
29 May 2004

Republic of Ireland	0–3	Nigeria
	Report	Ogbeche 36', 69'; Martins 50'

The Valley, London
Referee: Andy D'Urso (England)
31 May 2004

Jamaica	0–2	Nigeria
	Report	Utaka; Ogbeche 55'

The Valley, London
Referee: Steve Bennett (England)
2 June 2004

Jamaica	0–1	Republic of Ireland
	Report	Barrett 27'

The Valley, London
Referee: Rob Styles (England)

== Table ==
Rank	Team	Pld	W	D	L	GF	GA	GD	Pts
1	Nigeria	2	2	0	0	5	0	+5	6
2	Republic of Ireland	2	1	0	1	1	3	−2	3
3	Jamaica	2	0	0	2	0	3	−3	0
