= Francis Uzoho =

Nigerian footballer (born 1998)

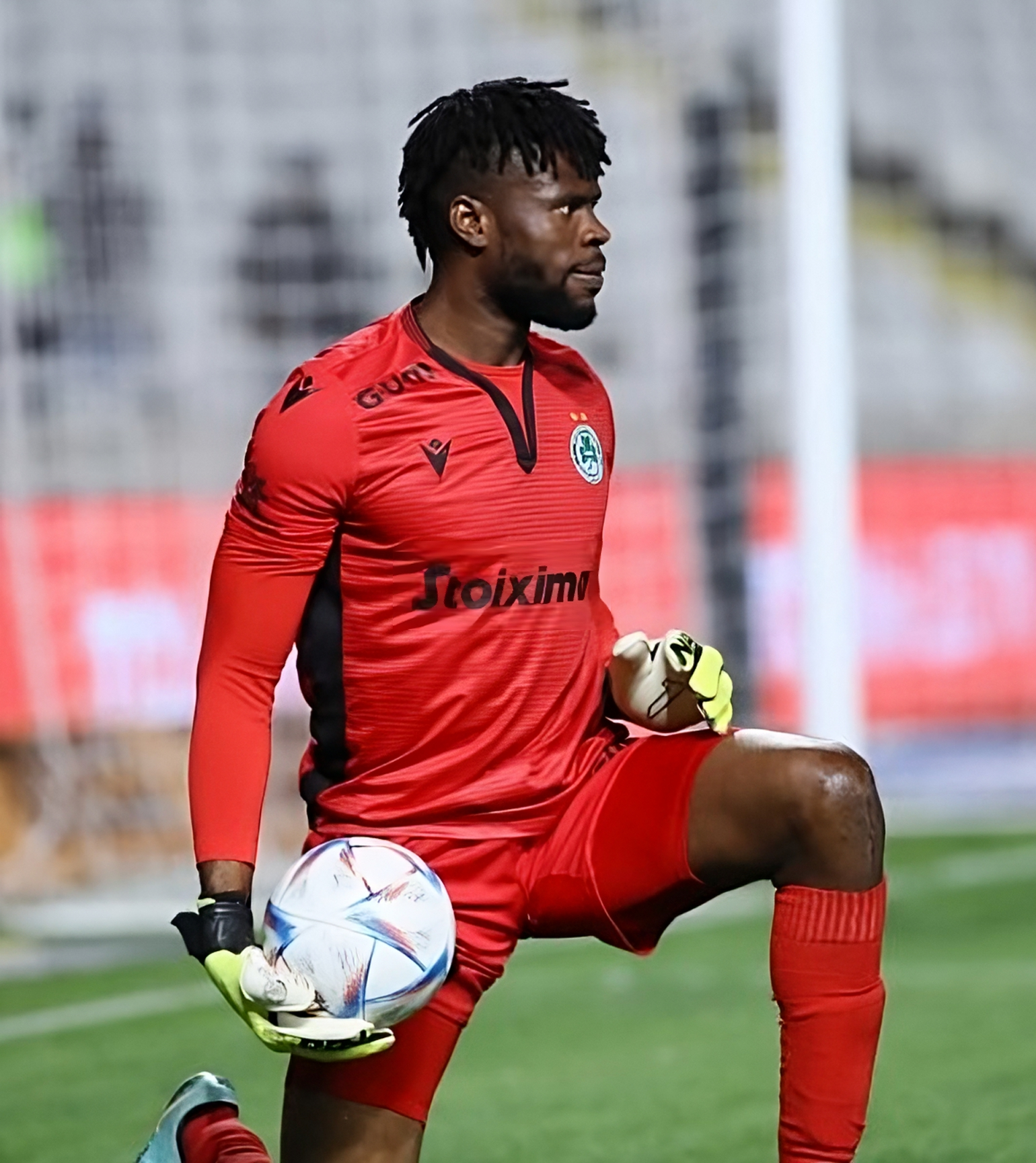
- Uzoho playing for Omonia in 2022

Personal information
- Full name: Francis Odinaka Uzoho
- Date of birth: 28 October 1998 (age 28)
- Place of birth: Ekitiafor Abba, Nwangele, Imo State, Nigeria
- Height: 1.96 m (6 ft 5 in)
- Position: Goalkeeper

Team information
- Current team: Omonia
- Number: 98

Youth career
- 2013–2016: Aspire Academy
- 2017: Deportivo La Coruña

Senior career*
Years	Team	Apps	(Gls)
2017–2018	Deportivo B	26	(0)
2017–2020	Deportivo La Coruña	2	(0)
2018–2019	→ Elche (loan)	8	(0)
2018–2019	→ Anorthosis (loan)	3	(0)
2019–2020	→ Omonia (loan)	5	(0)
2020–2021	APOEL	25	(0)
2021–	Omonia	50	(0)

International career^{‡}
2017–	Nigeria	37	(0)
Medal record
Men's football
Representing Nigeria
Africa Cup of Nations
Runner-up	2023 Ivory Coast
Third place	2019 Egypt
Third place	2025 Morocco
- * Club domestic league appearances and goals as of 14 June 2026 ‡ National team caps and goals as of 23:28, 31 March 2026 (UTC)

Francis Odinaka Uzoho MON // (born 28 October 1998) is a Nigerian professional footballer who plays as a goalkeeper for Cypriot First Division club Omonia and the Nigeria national team.

== Club career ==
=== Early career and Deportivo La Coruña ===
Born in Nwangele, Uzoho joined the Senegal branch of Aspire Academy in 2013, aged 14. Initially a forward, he became a goalkeeper after being deemed "too slow" at the age of 12. In 2016, after impressing at a tournament in Barcelona, he joined Deportivo de La Coruña's Juvenil squad.

Age rules meant that Uzoho could only become available to sign a contract with Dépor in January 2017; shortly after signing his contract, he started to train with the first team. Promoted to the reserve team ahead of the 2017–18 season, he made his senior debut on 10 September by starting in a 3–0 Segunda División B home win against Real Madrid Castilla.

Uzoho made his first team – and La Liga – debut on 15 October 2017, starting in a 0–0 away draw against SD Eibar. At the age of 18 years and 352 days, he became the youngest ever foreign goalkeeper to debut in La Liga, and the second-youngest player to appear in the league during the campaign at that point, only behind Real Madrid's Achraf Hakimi.

On 24 August 2018, Uzoho renewed his contract for three seasons and immediately loaned him to Segunda División side Elche CF for one year. In February 2019 he moved on loan to Cypriot club Anorthosis Famagusta, in the search of more first-team football in the run up to the 2019 Africa Cup of Nations.

After making his debut for the club, concerns were raised about his health certificate. As a result, Anorthosis Famagusta were deducted 9 points, which they appealed. The club's deduction appeal was rejected, although Uzoho's appeal against his personal penalty of a one-match ban and €1,000 fine was successful.

In July 2019 he returned on loan to Cyprus, this time with Omonia. He played few games, due to a serious injury he sustained while playing for his national team.

=== Permanent move to Cyprus ===
In July 2020, Uzoho moved permanently to APOEL on a three-year contract, but was released in August of the following year. On the deadline of the Summer transfer window, Uzoho joined Omonia on a three-year deal, which he would later renew until 2027.

On 13 October 2022, Uzoho received praise for his performance against Manchester United at Old Trafford in the Europa League. Omonia lost 1–0 to a late goal, but Uzoho made 12 saves on the night. He was nominated for the Europa League Player of the Week and Save of the Day awards.

In March 2023, Uzoho was named Nigerian Goalkeeper of the Year at the Nigeria Pitch Awards.

Although mostly considered second-choice goalkeeper behind Fabiano, Uzoho won the Cypriot Cup with Omonia in 2022 and 2023.

== International career ==
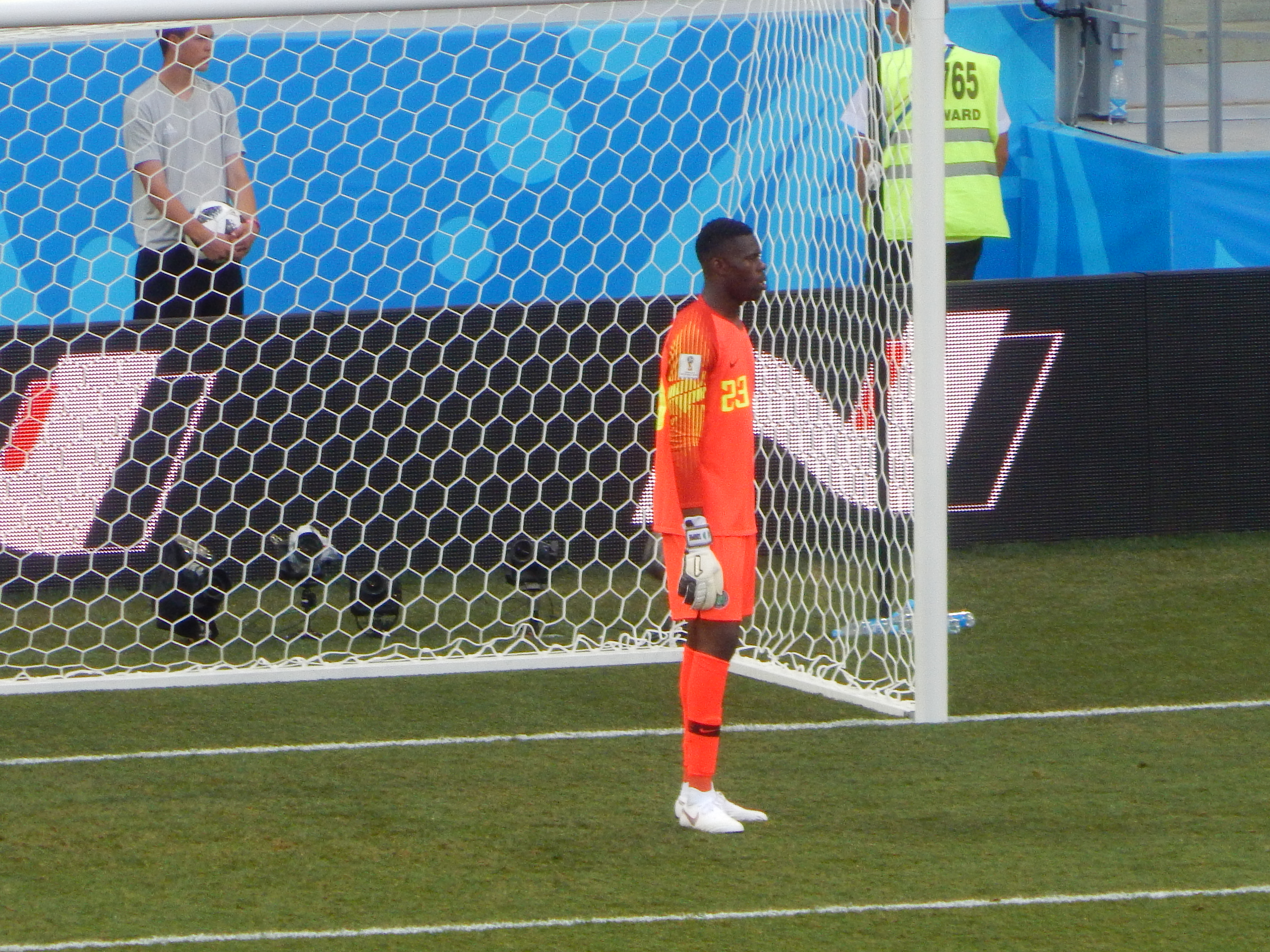
Uzoho with Nigeria against Iceland at the 2018 FIFA World Cup

Uzoho represented Nigeria under-17s at the 2013 FIFA U-17 World Cup. Aged only 14, he was an immediate backup to Dele Alampasu.

In October 2017, Uzoho received his first call-up to the Nigerian senior squad. He made his full international debut on 14 November, replacing Daniel Akpeyi in a 4–2 friendly win against Argentina.

He was named in Nigeria's 23-man squad for the 2018 FIFA World Cup in Russia. By that time he was considered Nigeria's first-choice goalkeeper. Uzoho started all three of his team's games at the tournament.

He withdrew from the national squad in November 2018 due to injury. He was a squad member at the 2019 Africa Cup of Nations. Uzoho was in goal for Nigeria in the 3rd place match against Tunisia, which they won.

In October 2019 he suffered a ligament injury in a friendly match against Brazil, and underwent surgery in November 2019.

Uzoho's injuries and recent performances had reduced him to a back-up role at the 2021 Africa Cup of Nations. In his only appearance in the competition, Uzoho kept a clean sheet against Guinea-Bissau in the group stage. His team would later be eliminated in the round of 16.

On 29 March 2022, Uzoho was in goal for Nigeria in a World Cup qualifier against Ghana. He suffered criticism for his performance, as an error on his behalf led to a goal for Ghana, and ultimately cost his team entry to the World Cup. He tendered an apology, mentioning "I wanted to take my nation to Qatar but rather did the opposite". National teammates and ex-internationals, such as Alex Iwobi and Vincent Enyeama, showed support for Uzoho.

Uzoho started five out of Nigeria's six games in the 2023 AFCON qualifiers, where they topped their group. However, during the main phase of the tournament, he lost his starting place in the team to Stanley Nwabali. His only appearance at the tournament came during the match against Cameroon when Nwabali got injured and had to be substituted.

On 11 December 2025, Uzoho was selected by head coach Éric Chelle as part of the Nigeria squad at the 2025 Africa Cup of Nations.

== Style of play ==
Francis Uzoho is known for his tall frame (1.96 m), good reflexes, and command of aerial balls. His size gives him an advantage in dealing with crosses and one-on-one situations. He is often praised for his composure under pressure and ability to make acrobatic saves, especially in close-range scenarios. While his shot-stopping is considered a strength, analysts have pointed out areas like distribution and decision-making under high pressing as aspects that have needed improvement over time.

Despite competition from other Nigerian goalkeepers, Uzoho has retained a role in the national team setup due to his experience and athleticism.

== Career statistics ==
=== Club ===
As of match played 11 March 2026

Appearances and goals by club, season and competition
Club	Season	League			National cup (Note: Includes Copa del Rey, Cypriot Cup)		Europe		Total	
Club	Season	Division	Apps	Goals	Apps	Goals	Apps	Goals	Apps	Goals
Deportivo B	2017–18	Segunda División B	26	0	—		—		26	0
Deportivo La Coruña	2017–18	La Liga	2	0	0	0	—		2	0
Elche (loan)	2018–19	Segunda División	7	0	1	0	—		8	0
Anorthosis (loan)	2018–19	Cypriot First Division	3	0	0	0	0	0	3	0
Omonia (loan)	2019–20	Cypriot First Division	5	0	0	0	—		5	0
APOEL	2020–21	Cypriot First Division	18	0	6	0	0	0	24	0
APOEL	2021–22	Cypriot First Division	1	0	0	0	—		1	0
APOEL	Total		19	0	6	0	0	0	25	0
Omonia	2021–22	Cypriot First Division	9	0	2	0	4 (Note: Appearance(s) in UEFA Conference League)	0	15	0
Omonia	2022–23	Cypriot First Division	18	0	1	0	4 (Note: Appearances in UEFA Europa League)	0	23	0
Omonia	2023–24	Cypriot First Division	10	0	3	0	0	0	13	0
Omonia	2024–25	Cypriot First Division	6	0	0	0	1	0	7	0
Omonia	2025–26	Cypriot First Division	3	0	0	0	5	0	8	0
Omonia	Total		46	0	6	0	14	0	66	0
Career total			108	0	13	0	14	0	132	0

=== International ===
As of match played 31 March 2026

Appearances and goals by national team and year
National team	Year	Apps	Goals
Nigeria	2017	1	0
Nigeria	2018	11	0
Nigeria	2019	4	0
Nigeria	2020	0	0
Nigeria	2021	2	0
Nigeria	2022	9	0
Nigeria	2023	7	0
Nigeria	2024	1	0
Nigeria	2025	1	0
Nigeria	2026	1	0
Total		37	0

== Honours ==
Omonia

- Cypriot First Division: 2025–26
- Cypriot Cup: 2021–22, 2022–23

Nigeria

- Africa Cup of Nations runner-up: 2023; third place: 2019, 2025

Orders

- Member of the Order of the Niger
