= Nigeria national football team =

Football team in Nigeria

Nigeria
- Nickname: Super Eagles (Note: Known as the "Red Devils" until 1961, and as the "Green Eagles" until 1988.)
- Association: Nigeria Football Federation (NFF)
- Confederation: CAF (Africa)
- Sub-confederation: WAFU (West Africa)
- Head coach: Éric Chelle
- Captain: Wilfred Ndidi
- Most caps: Ahmed Musa (110)
- Top scorer: Rashidi Yekini (37)
- Home stadium: Various (Note: Godswill Akpabio International Stadium, Moshood Abiola National Stadium, Lagos National Stadium, Teslim Balogun Stadium)
- FIFA code: NGA
First colours	Second colours

FIFA ranking
- Current: 29 ▲1 (18 November 2026)
- Highest: 5 (April 1994)
- Lowest: 82 (November 1999)

First international
- Sierra Leone 0–2 Nigeria (Freetown, Sierra Leone; 8 October 1949)

Biggest win
- São Tomé and Príncipe 0–10 Nigeria (Agadir, Morocco; 14 June 2022)

Biggest defeat
- Gold Coast and (United Kingdom) British Togoland 7–0 Nigeria (Accra, Gold Coast; 1 June 1955)

World Cup
- Appearances: 6 (first in 1994, last in 2018)
- Best result: Round of 16 (1994, 1998, 2014)

Africa Cup of Nations
- Appearances: 21 (first in 1963)
- Best result: Champions (1980, 1994, 2013)

African Nations Championship
- Appearances: 3 (first in 2014)
- Best result: Runners-up (2018)

Afro-Asian Cup of Nations
- Appearances: 1 (first in 1995)
- Best result: Champions (1995)

Confederations Cup
- Appearances: 2 (first in 1995)
- Best result: Fourth place (1995)
Medal record
Men's football
Afro-Asian Cup of Nations
Gold medal – first place	1995 Uzbekistan and Nigeria	Team
Africa Cup of Nations
Gold medal – first place	1980 Nigeria	Team
Gold medal – first place	1994 Tunisia	Team
Gold medal – first place	2013 South Africa	Team
Silver medal – second place	1984 Ivory Coast	Team
Silver medal – second place	1988 Morocco	Team
Silver medal – second place	1990 Algeria	Team
Silver medal – second place	2000 Ghana and Nigeria	Team
Silver medal – second place	2023 Ivory Coast	Team
Bronze medal – third place	1976 Ethiopia	Team
Bronze medal – third place	1978 Ghana	Team
Bronze medal – third place	1992 Senegal	Team
Bronze medal – third place	2002 Mali	Team
Bronze medal – third place	2004 Tunisia	Team
Bronze medal – third place	2006 Egypt	Team
Bronze medal – third place	2019 Egypt	Team
Bronze medal – third place	2025 Morocco	Team
African Nations Championship
Silver medal – second place	2018 Morocco	Team
Bronze medal – third place	2014 South Africa	Team
African Games
Gold medal – first place	1973 Lagos	Team
Silver medal – second place	1978 Algiers	Team
WAFU Nations Cup
Gold medal – first place	2010 Nigeria	Team
Silver medal – second place	2011 Nigeria	Team
Silver medal – second place	2017 Ghana	Team

The Nigeria national football team (Note: Hausa: Ƙungiyar ƙwallon ƙafar Najeriya, Igbo: Otu egwuregwu bọọlụ Naịjirịa na, Yoruba: Ẹgbẹ́ agbábọ́ọ̀lù-ẹlẹ́sẹ̀ ọmọorílẹ̀-èdè Nàìjíríà) represents Nigeria in international men's football. Governed by the Nigeria Football Federation (NFF), they are three-time Africa Cup of Nations (AFCON) winners, with their most recent title in 2013. In February 2024, the Nigerian national football team was ranked 28th in the FIFA rankings. The team has qualified for six of the last nine FIFA World Cups, missing only the 2006, 2022 and 2026 tournaments. They have reached the round of 16 on three occasions. Their first World Cup appearance was in the 1994 edition. The Nigeria Football Federation is affiliated with FIFA and the Confederation of African Football (CAF).

== History ==
The Nigeria "UK Tourists" national team prior to their tour of the UK in 1949. The team were known among the West African nations at the time as the "Red Devils" due to their red shirts.

=== Early history ===
Nigeria first played other colonies in unofficial games, initially in 1938 when they played the Gold Coast with a team of Lagos-based players. Nigeria formed a representative national team to send abroad for a tour of England, arriving in Liverpool on 29 August 1949, and playing matches against amateur sides including Marine A.F.C. (which drew 6,000 spectators, a record their Rossett Park ground), Bishop Auckland, Leytonstone, Dulwich Hamlet and Bromley. Nigeria then played its first official game in October 1949, while still a British colony, as they beat Sierra Leone 2–0 in Freetown.

=== 1963–1980 ===
Nigeria first appeared in the Africa Cup of Nations in 1963, when they were drawn in a group with Sudan, and the then United Arab Republic. They did not advance to the next stage.

The team's first major success was a gold medal in the 2nd All-Africa games in 1973 led by captain, Victor Oduah. The team went on to achieve 3rd-place finishes in the 1976 and 1978 African Cup of Nations to follow. In 1980, with players such as Segun Odegbami and Best Ogedegbe, the team, led by Christian Chukwu, won the African Cup for the first time in Lagos.

Nigeria Olympic Men's football team won the football event at the 1996 Olympics in Atlanta, beating Mexico, Brazil and Argentina in the process. They were runners-up in the same event at the 2008 Olympics in Beijing, losing to Argentina in a rematch of the 1996 Final of the event.

In 1984, 1988 and 2000, Nigeria reached the Cup of Nations final, losing to Cameroon. Three of the five African titles won by Cameroon have been won by defeating Nigeria. Missing out to Cameroon on many occasions has created an intense rivalry between both nations. Three notable occasions; narrowly losing out in the 1988 African Cup of Nations, qualifiers for the 1990 World Cup, and the controversial final of the 2000 African Cup of Nations where a kick taken by Victor Ikpeba during the penalty shoot-out was adjudged not to have crossed the goal-line by the referee.

The team withdrew from two African Cup of Nations between 1963 and 1974, due to political instability and in 1996. In 1976, they came back to the Cup of Nations with third-place finishes in both the 1976 and 1978 African Cup of Nations.

=== 1980–1990 ===
Nigeria hosted the 1980 Africa Cup of Nations and also won their first Cup of Nations title that year in Lagos. Nigeria came out as runners-up three times and had one group stage elimination, between 1982 and 1990. They also failed to qualify for the 1986 Africa Cup of Nations hosted by Egypt.

=== 1992–2006 ===
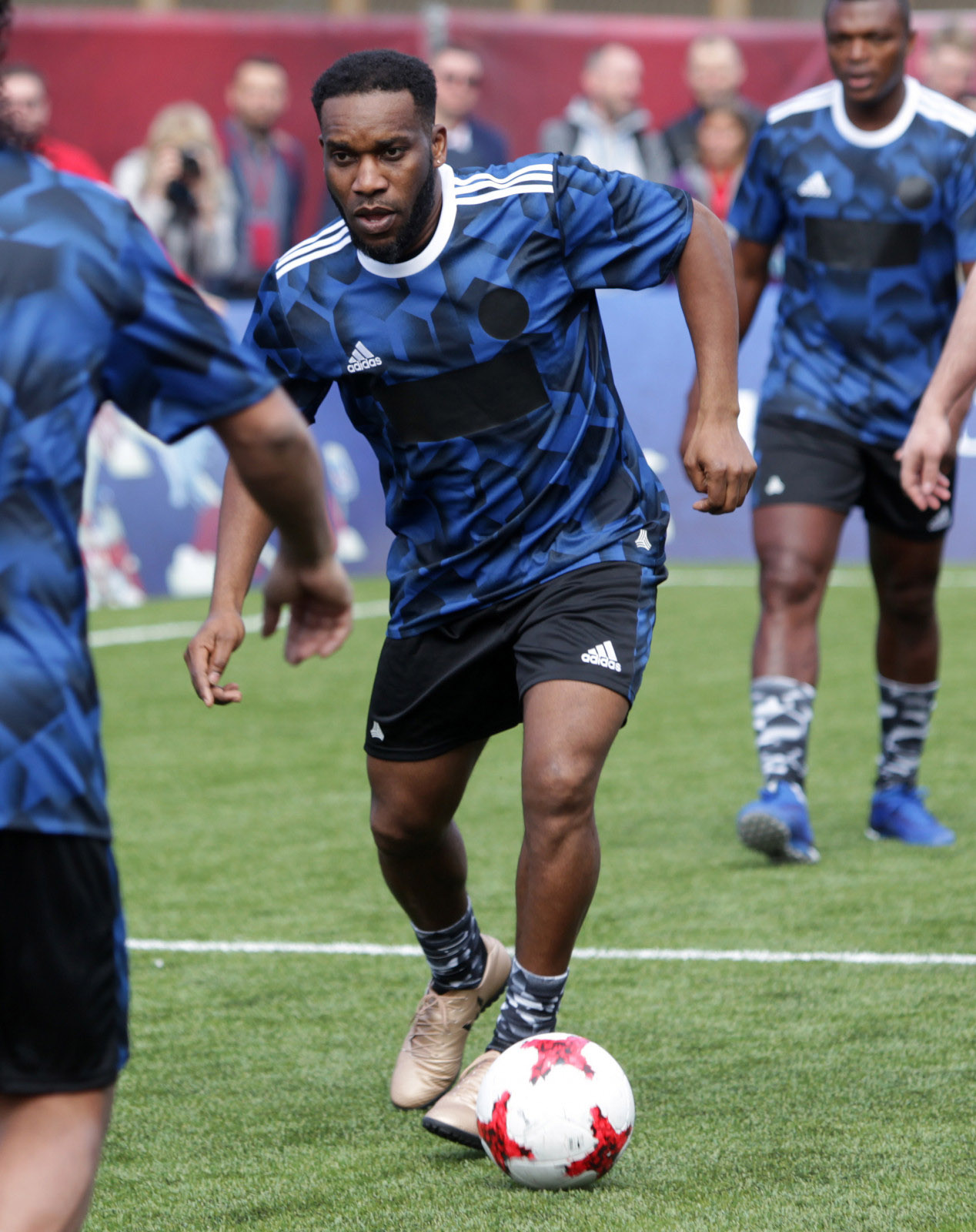
Jay-Jay Okocha, one of Nigeria's greatest-ever footballers, represented the country in three World Cups.

Nigeria appeared again in the African Cup of Nations in 1992 and 1994, they finished third in 1992 and won the 1994 Africa Cup of Nations, which was the second time they won the tournament.

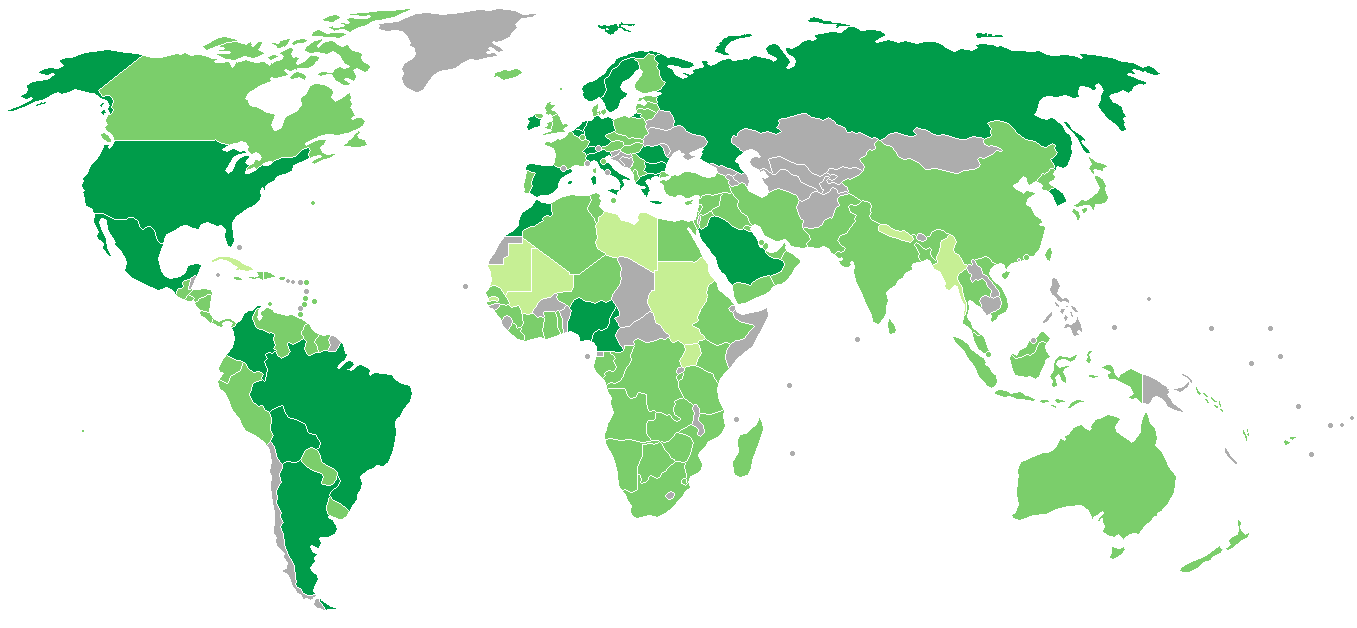
Countries qualified for the 1994 FIFA World Cup are shown in dark green

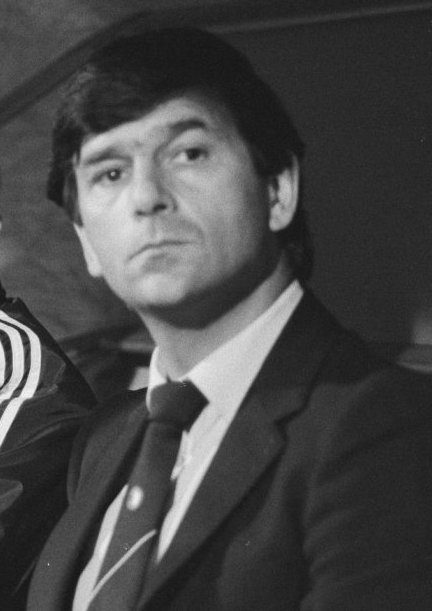
Clemens Westerhof managed the team from 1989 through the 1994 World Cup.

Nigeria finally reached the World Cup for the first time in 1994 after years of struggling to get there. They were managed by Clemens Westerhof. Nigeria topped their group which included Argentina, Bulgaria, and Greece. Nigeria defeated Bulgaria 3–0, lost to Argentina 1–2, and reached the second round after a 2–0 victory over Greece. In the second round, Nigeria played Italy and took the lead with a goal from Emmanuel Amunike in the 25th minute. Nigeria was within two minutes of qualifying for the quarter-finals, when Roberto Baggio scored to take the game to extra time. He also scored the eventual winning goal. The game ended 2–1 in favour of the Italians. In 1996 the team withdrew from that year's African Cup of Nations under pressure from the country's military dictator Sani Abacha due to the criticism received from the tournament hosts South Africa and especially its president Nelson Mandela, for the execution of Ogoni activist Ken Saro-Wiwa. Nigeria was subsequently banned from entering the 1998 African Cup of Nations.

In 1998, Nigeria returned to the World Cup alongside Cameroon, Morocco, Tunisia, and South Africa. Optimism was high due to its manager Bora Milutinović and the return of most 1994 squad members. In the final tournament Nigeria were drawn into group D with Spain, Bulgaria, Paraguay. Nigeria scored a major upset by defeating Spain 3–2 after coming back twice from being 1–0 and 2–1 down. The Eagles qualified for the second round with a win against Bulgaria and a loss to Paraguay. The team's hopes of surpassing its 1994 performance were shattered after a 1–4 loss to Denmark. This is currently the only World Cup that Nigeria qualified for without playing Argentina in the tournament finals.

In 2000 they returned to the Cup of Nations and were the runner-up and subsequently finished in third place at the 2002, 2004 and 2006 Africa Cup of Nations.

==== 2002 and 2006 World Cups ====
The 2002 World Cup in South Korea and Japan saw Nigeria again qualify with optimism. With a new squad and distinctive pastel green kits, the Super Eagles were expected to build on its strong performances in the 2000 and 2002 African Cup of Nations. Nigeria was drawn into group F with powerhouses Sweden, Argentina, and England. The first game against Argentina started with a strong defense that kept the first half scoreless. In the 61st minute, Gabriel Batistuta breached the Nigerian defense to put Argentina in the lead 1–0, and Argentina would go on to win the game. Nigeria's second game against Sweden saw them take the lead but later lose 2–1. Nigeria then drew 0–0 with England and bowed out in the first round.

Nigeria failed to qualify for the 2006 World Cup after finishing level on points in the qualification group with Angola, but having an inferior record in the matches between the sides.

=== 2008–2013 ===
Egypt versus Nigeria lineup at 2010 Africa Cup of Nations, Uzomedia

In the 2008 Africa Cup of Nations, Nigeria ended their campaign in the quarter finals after losing to Ghana. They qualified for 2010 Africa Cup of Nations, hosted by Angola, but were eliminated by Ghana in the semi-finals.

On 14 November 2009, Nigeria qualified for the 2010 World Cup after defeating Kenya by 3–2 in Nairobi.

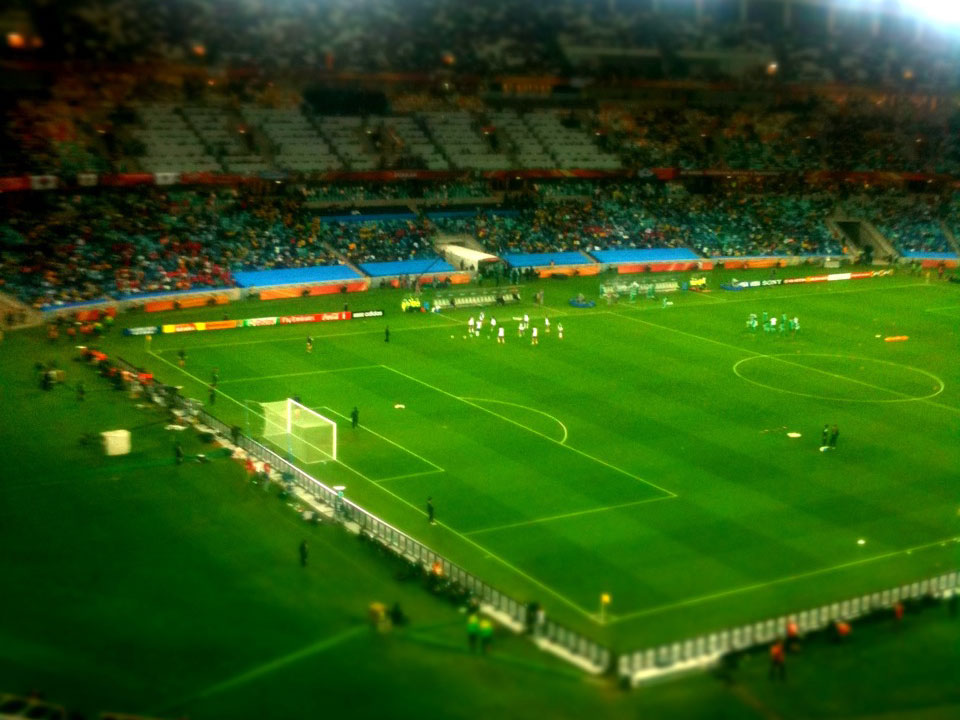
Nigeria played against South Korea at the 2010 FIFA World Cup

Nigeria lost its opening match against Argentina 1–0 at Ellis Park Stadium following a controversial Gabriel Heinze header in the 6th minute. In its second game Nigeria led early on by a goal from Kalu Uche. A red card against Sani Kaita gave Greece the advantage. Greece scored the equaliser late in the first half and Nigeria conceded the second goal in the second half and lost the game 2–1. In their last group stage match against South Korea, Nigeria took an early lead in the 12th minute off of a great finish by Kalu Uche after a low cross from Chidi Odiah. However, goals from Lee Jung-Soo and Park Chu-Young gave South Korea a 2–1 lead, which looked to be enough for South Korea to advance into the round of 16. However, Nigeria got a chance in the 66th minute, on the end of a pass from Ayila Yussuf that was fed through the South Korean defense was none other than Yakubu, once the pass found Yakubu's foot about four yards away from the empty goal, Yakubu pushed the ball wide of the left post to leave South Korea still ahead 2–1. Three minutes later, Yakubu was able to calmly finish a penalty to knot the score at two apiece, but Nigeria was unable to score again and the match ended in a 2–2 draw. With this result, Nigeria was eliminated from the 2010 World Cup with just one point, while South Korea advanced into the round of 16 with four points. On 30 June 2010, following the team's early exit and poor showing, the then President of Nigeria, Goodluck Jonathan suspended the national football team from international competition for two years. This suspension put the team at risk of being banned from international football by FIFA for reasons of political interference.

On 5 July 2010, the Nigerian government rescinded its ban of the national football team from FIFA/CAF football competitions, but the sanction of suspension was applied by FIFA some three months after. On 4 October 2010, Nigeria was indefinitely banned from international football due to government interference following the 2010 World Cup. Four days later, however, the ban was "provisionally lifted" until 26 October, the day after the officially unrecognised players' union – National Association of Nigerian Footballers (NANF) dropped its court case against the NFF.

Nigeria failed to qualify for the 2012 Africa Cup of Nations after ending the qualifiers with a 2–2 draw against Guinea with goals from Ikechukwu Uche and Victor Obinna, but were successful in their 2013 Africa Cup of Nations qualification campaign, qualifying for the final tournament in South Africa after an 8–3 aggregate win over Liberia; after playing through the tournament with an unbeaten run, they defeated Burkina Faso 1–0 in the final to lift the Cup for the third time. However, they did not qualify for either of the next two tournaments.

=== 2014–present ===
==== 2014 World Cup ====
Line-ups for the 2014 FIFA World Cup Group F match between Nigeria and Bosnia & Herzegovina

Nigeria's campaign in the 2014 FIFA World Cup opened with a disappointing 0–0 draw against Iran. Four days later the team played their second game against Bosnia and Herzegovina. A controversial 29th-minute Peter Odemwingie goal gave Nigeria their first World Cup match win since 1998. They faced Argentina another four days later: a 3rd minute Lionel Messi goal for the opposition was followed almost instantly with an equalizer by Ahmed Musa. Messi gave Argentina the lead back just before half-time. In the second half, Musa leveled the game out again, Lionel Messi was substituted and handed over his captaincy to Marcos Rojo only for Rojo to put Argentina 3–2 ahead minutes later.

Nigeria lost the match, but still qualified for the round of 16. In the Round of 16, Nigeria faced France, an 18th-minute stabbed shot from Emmanuel Emenike saw the ball in the net, past the French goal-keeper but the goal was ruled off-side by the linesman. Nigeria held them off until the 79th minute when a cross and a Paul Pogba header gifted France the lead. An accidental own goal by Super Eagles Captain Joseph Yobo in injury time put the result beyond any doubt: Nigeria was out. This is the third time Nigeria is eliminated in the round of 16 and they were not still able to enter the Quarter-finals in the FIFA World Cup.

==== 2018 World Cup ====
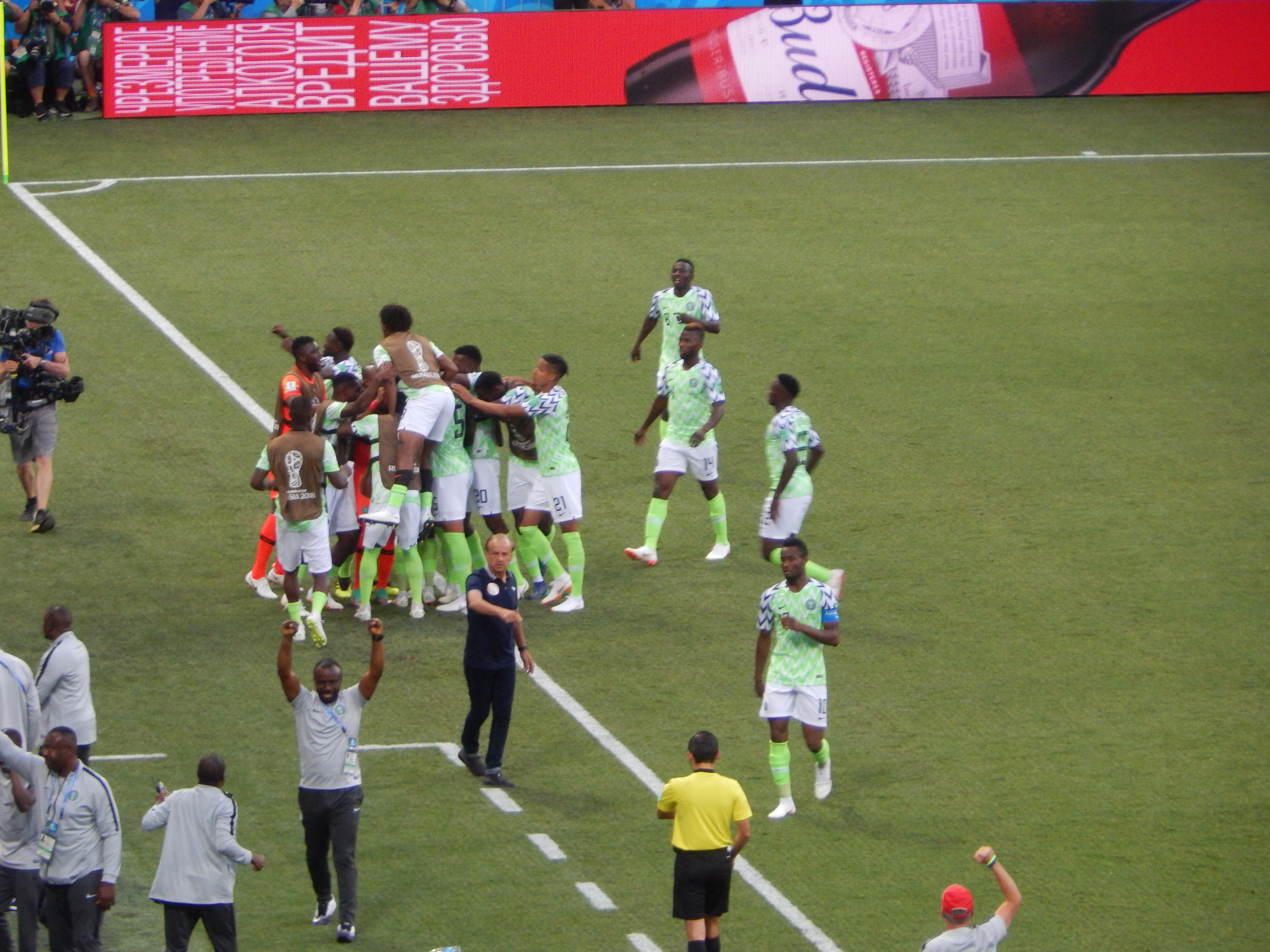
Nigeria vs Iceland at the 2018 FIFA World Cup

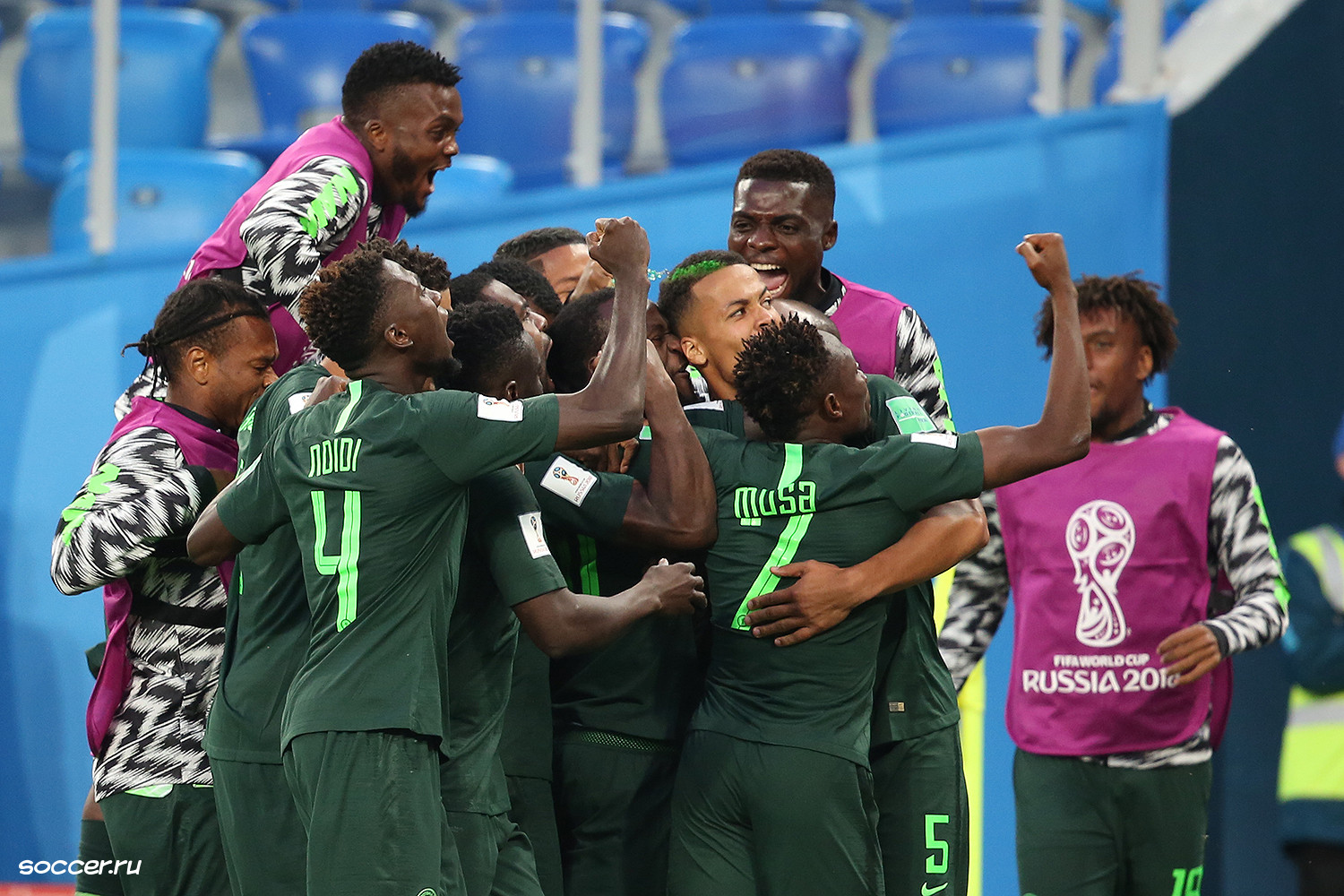
Nigeria vs Argentina at the 2018 FIFA World Cup

On 24 June 2016, The Confederation of African Football released the draw for the 3rd round of the World Cup qualifiers which saw Nigeria grouped in what was described as a "group of death"; alongside Zambia, Algeria, and Cameroon. Nigeria started their group stage matches with a 2–1 win over Zambia in Ndola and defeated Algeria 3–1 in their second match at the Godswill Akpabio International Stadium. They went on to beat Cameroon 5–1 home and away in a back to back contest.

The Super Eagles of Nigeria became the first African team to qualify for the 2018 FIFA World Cup after beating Zambia 1–0 in Uyo. On 3 June 2018, coach Gernot Rohr unveiled a 23-man squad for the 2018 FIFA World Cup. Nigeria lost their first match of the tournament 0–2 to Croatia in Kaliningrad, before they won 2–0 in the second match against a brave Iceland, with Ahmed Musa scoring both goals. Nigeria had a huge chance to qualify to the next round as Argentina was demolished 3–0 by Croatia. Despite this advantage, they lost 2–1 in their last group stage match against Argentina, with one goal by Victor Moses. For this defeat, and followed with Iceland's defeat to Croatia, Nigeria missed the opportunity to advance to the round of 16 and got eliminated from the tournament.

==== 2019 Africa Cup of Nations ====
The Super Eagles started their campaign at the 2019 AFCON by defeating Burundi 1–0 in group B opening match. They went on to defeat Guinea and lost 2–0 to Madagascar in their final group stage match. The round of 16 saw the national football team of Nigeria defeating Cameroon 3–2 with goals coming from Jude Ighalo and Iwobi, they later went on to confront South Africa in the quarter-finals of the tournament. An 89th-minute header from Troost-Ekong gave Nigeria the lead over South Africa and the match ended 2–1 in favour of Nigeria. Nigeria faced Algeria in the semi-finals and were knocked out of the tournament after a 95th-minute free kick from Riyad Mahrez gave Algeria the lead. The Super Eagles later faced Tunisia in a third place match which they won 1–0 with the only goal coming from Ighalo which made him the top scorer of the tournament.

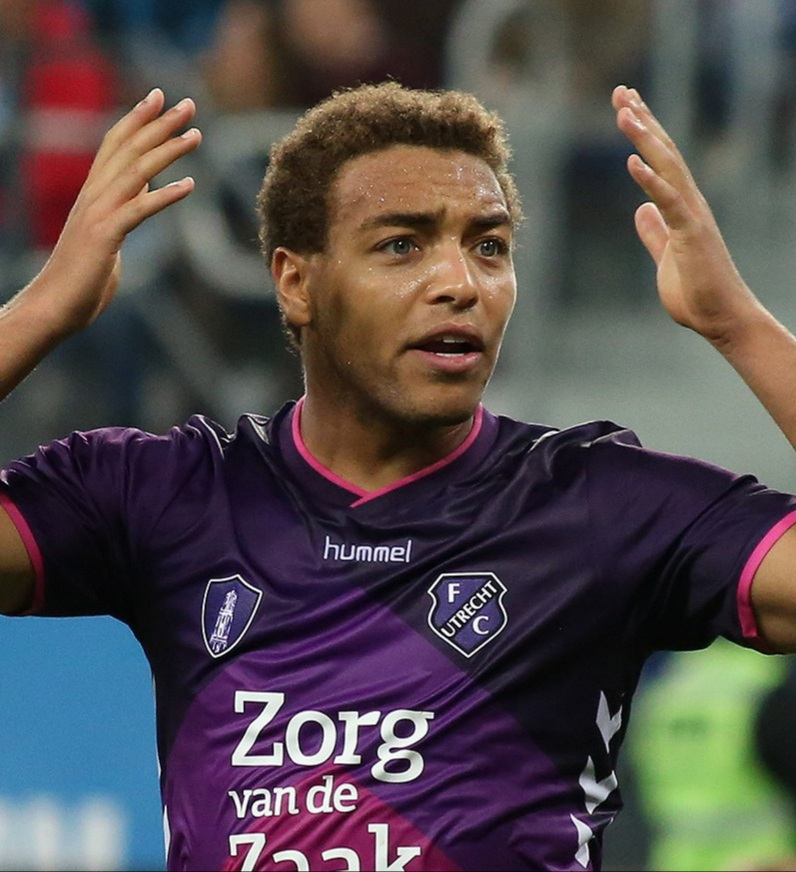
Cyriel Dessers played his first game for the national football team of Nigeria in 2020.

==== 2021 Africa Cup of Nations ====
On 18 July 2019, the Confederation of African Football (CAF) released the draw for the 2021 Africa Cup of Nations qualification. The Super Eagles were grouped in group L alongside Lesotho, Benin, and Sierra Leone. Nigeria started out by defeating Benin 2–1 at Uyo in their first group match and later went on to beat Lesotho 4–2 in an away match. In March 2020, as a result of the COVID-19 pandemic, the CAF postponed all AFCON qualifiers indefinitely. Subsequently, on 30 June 2020, CAF rescheduled the 2021 African Cup of Nations to 2022, to take place from 9 January to 6 February 2022. The qualifiers resumed on 9 November 2020.

The 2021 AFCON started on 9 January 2022, and Nigeria was the only team in the tournament to win all three group stage matches after defeating Egypt 1–0, Sudan 3–1, and Guinea-Bissau 2–0. However, Nigeria lost 1–0 in the round of 16 to Tunisia on 23 January.

==== 2022 World Cup ====
Nigeria failed to qualify for the FIFA World Cup for the first time in 16 years, losing to Ghana on the away goals rule after drawing 0–0 in Ghana and 1–1 in Nigeria.

==== 2023 Africa Cup of Nations ====
The Super Eagles started their campaign at the 2023 AFCON by drawing 1–1 to Equatorial Guinea in their opening group A match. They went on to defeat hosts Ivory Coast 1–0 and defeated Guinea Bissau in the same scoreline. The round of 16 saw the national football team of Nigeria defeating Cameroon 2–0 with a brace from Ademola Lookman, they later went on to defeat Angola in the quarter-finals of the tournament thanks to a first half strike from Lookman. Nigeria faced South Africa in the semi-finals. Substitute Kelechi Iheanacho scored to give Nigeria a 4–2 penalty shootout victory over South Africa. The match finished 1–1 after extra time. In the final, the Super Eagles finished as runners-up, losing 2–1 to hosts Ivory Coast.

== Team image ==
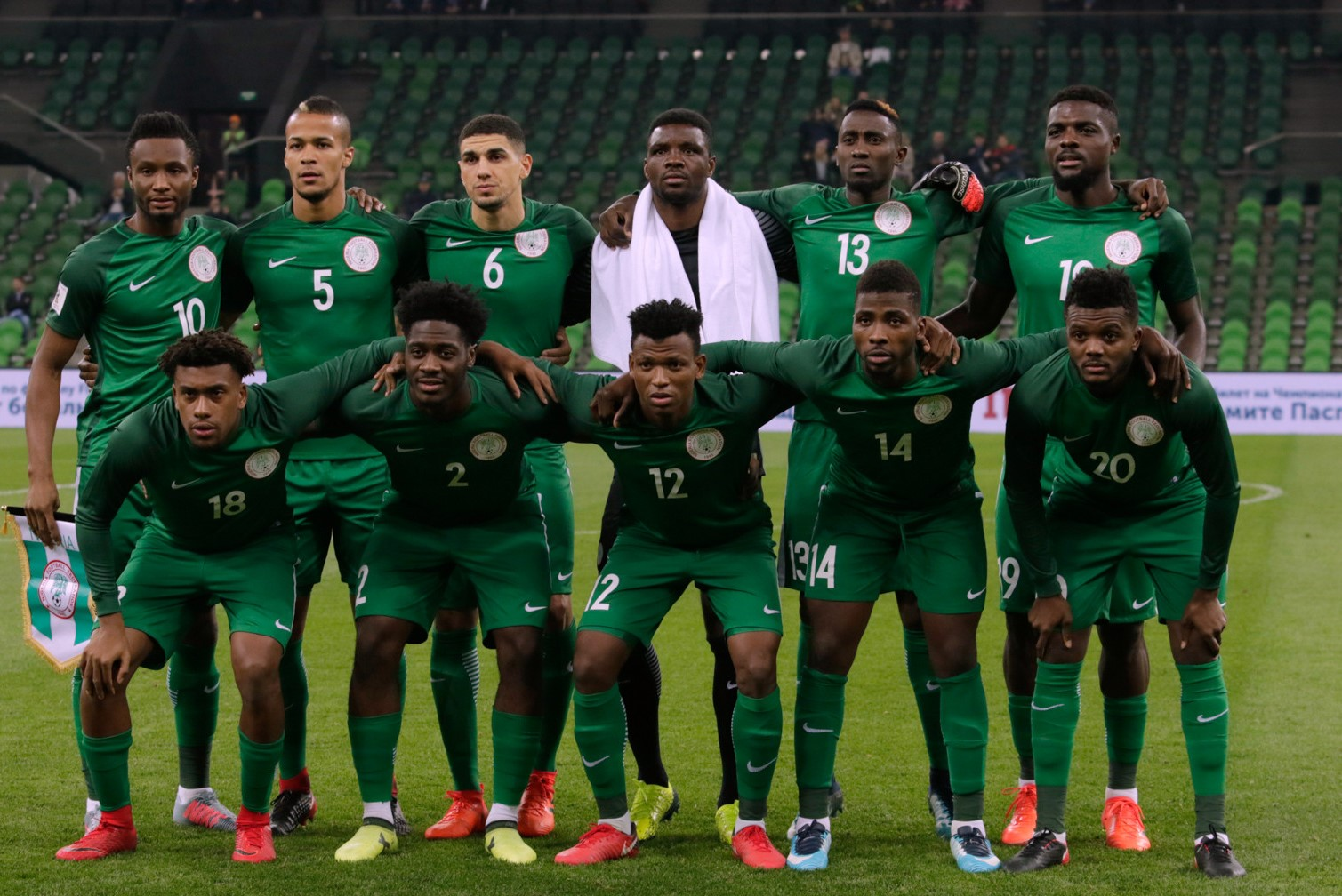
Argentina versus Nigeria in a friendly match on 14 November 2017

=== Kits and crest ===
The Nigeria national team has traditionally used a mostly-solid green on green primary set with white numbering, lettering, and highlights; coupled with all-white reversed secondary kits, all emblematic of the colours of the Nigerian flag. The shade of green has varied over the years. An olive drab-tinged, forest green was frequently favoured during the 1980s to the early 1990s, and jade has appeared in each of those decades as well; even harlequin has been used. Over the last decade, the team has appeared to settle on the more standard office green which most closely resembles the shade used on the flag. Nigeria's first national teams used a solid scarlet top over white shorts and socks until the country adopted its current colours after its independence. Highlights of black have become more frequent recently on both home and away kits.

On 23 April 2015, Nike was announced to be the supplier of Nigeria's kits after Adidas ended their kit contract with the NFF. Before that, Nike supplied Nigeria's kit between 1994 and 2003. The kit Nike designed for Nigeria to wear at the 2018 World Cup went on to become one of the most popular international kits for collectors.

==== Kit suppliers ====
Kit supplier	Period	Notes
(West Germany) Erima	1980–1983	Used during early golden era including 1980 AFCON win.
(United Kingdom) Admiral	1984–1987	Featured during Nigeria's rebuilding phase.
(Germany) Adidas	1988–1994	Worn during 1994 AFCON win and USA 1994 World Cup.
(United States) Nike	1995–2003	Worn during Nigeria's debut Olympic gold (1996) and three World Cups (1994, 1998, 2002).
(Germany) Adidas	2004–2014	Kit supplier for 2006, 2010, and 2014 World Cup squads.
(United States) Nike	2015–2026	Iconic 2018 World Cup kit went viral globally. Also used for 2019, 2021, and 2023 AFCONs.
(Germany) Adidas	2027–present	

==== Kit deals ====
Kit supplier	Period	Announced	Duration	Value	Notes
(United States) Nike	2015–present	1 January 2015	1 January 2015 – 30 October 2018 (3.5 years)	US$3.75 million (₦743 million)	
(United States) Nike	2015–present	20 November 2018	1 November 2018 – 31 December 2026 (8 years 2 months)	Undisclosed	The new deal is reported to be worth significantly more than the previous US$3.75 million contract.

Nigeria's national team image has evolved throughout its history. Before independence, they were nicknamed the "Red Devils" due to their red-topped kits. After independence, the name was changed to the "Green Eagles", referencing the national flag and the eagle from the coat of arms. Though still known as the Green Eagles at the 1988 Africa Cup of Nations, the name "Super Eagles" was officially adopted at a post-tournament reception.

Today, only the senior men's national team uses the "Super Eagles" nickname. The women's team is known as the "Super Falcons", while the male youth teams are the "Flying Eagles" (U-20) and the "Golden Eaglets" (U-17).

=== Media coverage ===
The Nigerian football federation currently has an active deal with the parent company of AIT and Ray Power Radio. Internationally, Nigeria's qualifiers and African Cup matches are regularly broadcast abroad by the multi-platform international sports network, beIN Sports and South African broadcaster SuperSport. Nigeria's international friendlies are regularly scheduled in the UK through independent organisers are marketed to the country's large population of Nigerian expatriates.

=== Supporters ===
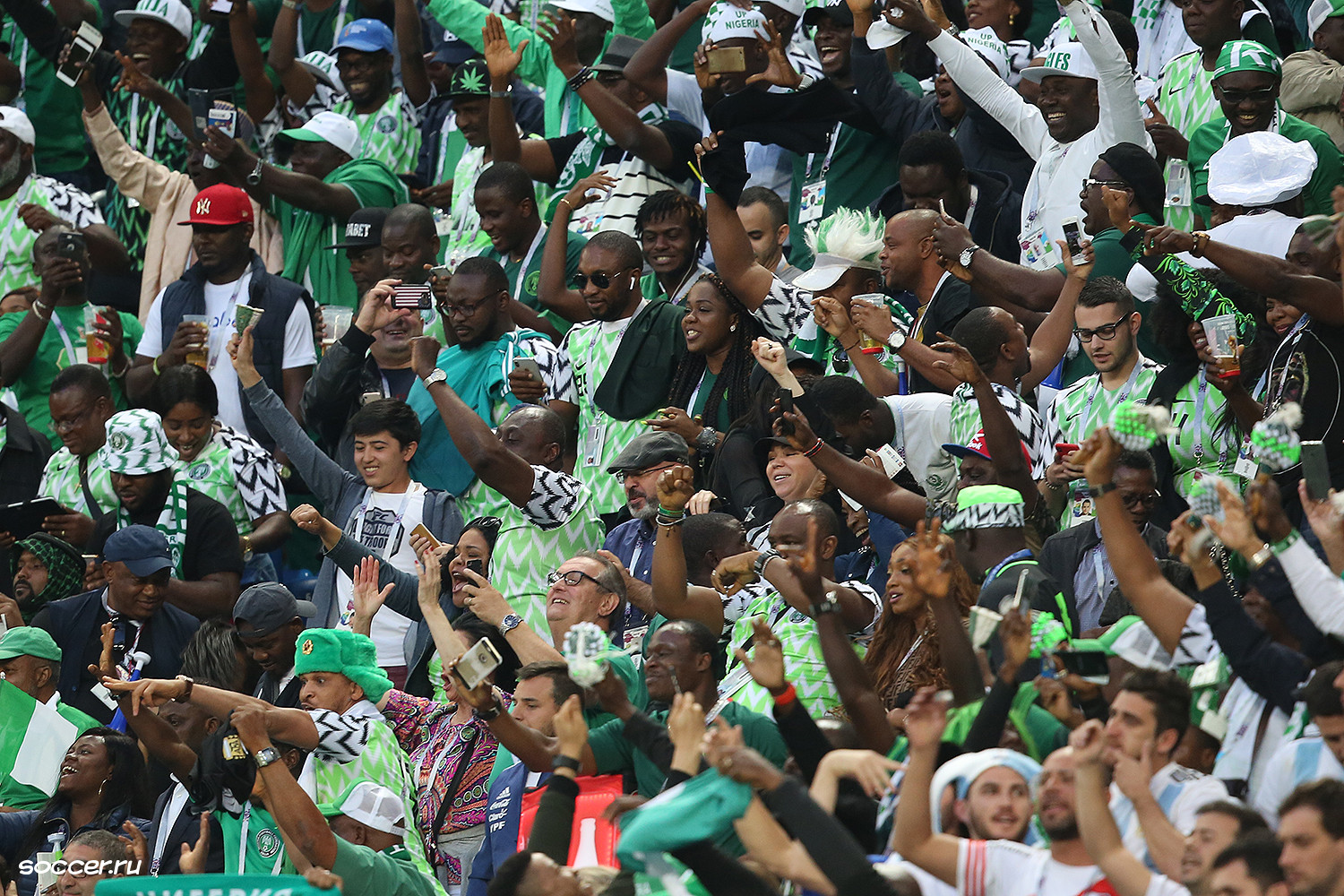
Nigerian football supporters at the 2018 FIFA World Cup in Russia

Though the club is most notable at Nigeria's home matches wearing green-themed embroidered outfits specific to the club along with wigs, hats and large sunglasses while dancing, singing, playing drums and trumpets, as well as carrying pom poms, culturally significant objects, inflatable beachballs, and waving flags; they have also shown a presence travelling abroad to support Nigeria in away matches. However, the club's efforts at improving the atmosphere at Nigeria's home and away matches are beset by funding issues, corruption and infighting. The club's current head, Rafiu Ladipo, has drawn criticism from its membership and is under pressure to defer the leadership to one of his deputies.

A regular sight at Nigerian home matches is also their brass and percussion band, whose rendition of well-known Highlife songs provides Nigerian home matches with a unique feel. In Nigeria, these performers are occasionally conspicuous with their military uniforms or they may be members of the Football Supporters Club. A popular chant among supporters from all over the country, after a goal scored, is "Oshe Baba!", which means "Thank you father!" in Yoruba.

== Rivalries ==
=== Ghana ===
Many important matches have been played against various nations who have been occasional rivals. Of these nations, Ghana is widely considered Nigeria's primary rival as the two sides have met one another more than any other opponent, as well as being two of the most successful national teams in Africa. Nigeria has enjoyed periods of success. The most notable of these periods are the early contests during the 1950s, and matches that took place in the early 2000s.

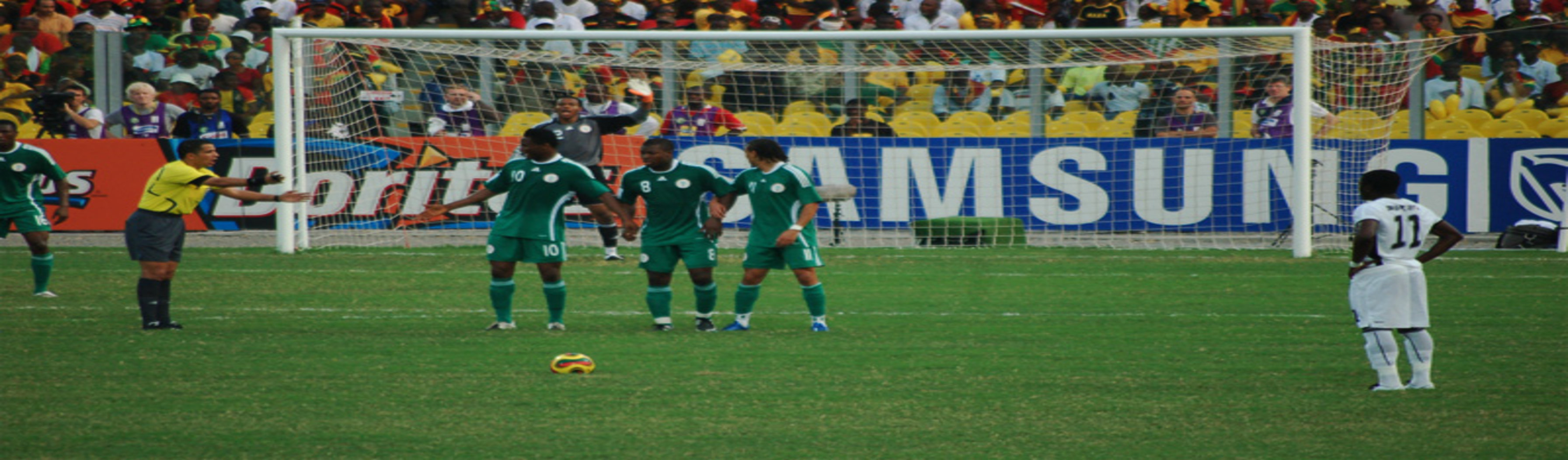
Ghana vs. Nigeria in the 2008 Africa Cup of Nations Quarter-Final

FIFA lists the first official match between the two as a World Cup qualifier match in 1960. However both national teams had already engaged in competitive matches dating back to 1950. The national teams of these two West African countries were formed during the time in which both remained protectorates of the British Empire. At that time the modern-day nation of Ghana was known as the Gold Coast. Nigeria, prior to adopting the national colours of green and white, wore scarlet tops over white shorts and were known as the "Red Devils". The two sides played for several rivalry and tournament cups during this period in which full international competition was barred to them. The encounter between these two teams is commonly known as the Jollof Derby.

=== Cameroon ===
Nigeria's neighbours to the east, Cameroon, have also played Nigeria a number of times over the years. The teams have met three times in the final of the African Cup of Nations with Cameroon winning each time. Both carry histories of continental success and World Cup representation that is nearly unrivaled on the African continent.

Their rivalry began in 1960 and since then, Nigeria has proved to be a more dominating team, but in all three AFCON Final matches in 1984, 1988 and 2000, Cameroon prevailed over Nigeria.

Nigeria has qualified for six FIFA World Cup finals, advancing from the group stage three times (1994, 1998 and 2014), getting knocked out in the round of 16 all three times, while Cameroon has qualified eight times, advancing from the group stage only once (1990) though they made it to the quarter-finals in that edition.

=== Other African nations ===
There is also a number of competitive matches with Algeria dating back to the 1970s. The two sides met twice in the African Cup of Nations finals, with each nation splitting the win totals. It was a 1–1 draw in Algeria on 8 October 1993 that enabled Nigeria to claim its first World Cup berth in the 1994 edition of the tournament. Nigeria since then had an undefeated streak against Algeria, until the semi-finals of the 2019 Africa Cup of Nations when Algeria prevailed over Nigeria.

Nigeria's western neighbour, Benin, has played competitive matches with the team since the period of European colonisation when they were known as Dahomey. But with only two wins and two draws to Benin's credit against Nigeria's fourteen wins, and with the sides having only met six times since 1980, Benin remains a lightly regarded opponent.

=== Argentina ===
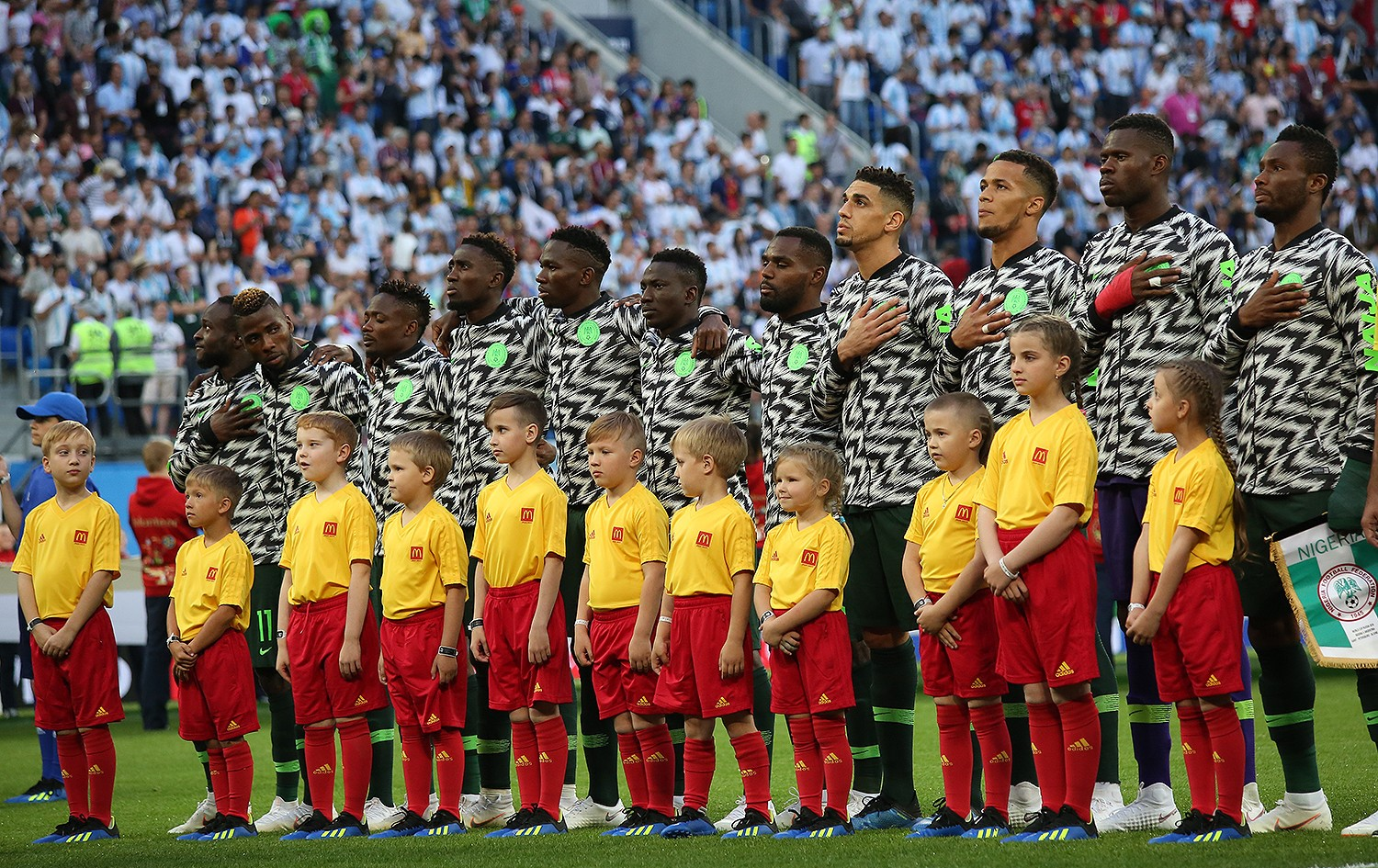
Nigeria starting eleven versus Argentina at the 2018 FIFA World Cup

In five of its six World Cup appearances, Nigeria was drawn in the group stage with three-time champion Argentina and is regarded by many fans as having fairly acquitted themselves against the footballing giant. The fixture is the most common in the competition's history involving an African nation. All five matches have been won by Argentina, but all were by a one-goal margin (2–1 in 1994, 1–0 in 2002, 1–0 in 2010, 3–2 in 2014 and 2–1 in 2018) and have been tightly contested. To date, Nigeria has recorded two wins against Argentina's six, with the victories occurring during friendly matches. Nigeria came close to defeating Argentina in their first meeting, during which they held a lead for some minutes of the match. This was followed by a Confederations Cup match in 1995 which saw Nigeria hold the South Americans to a 0–0 draw. Below full international level, their Olympic teams also faced off in the gold medal match in 1996 (3–2 to Nigeria), and 2008 (1–0 to Argentina). The final of the 2005 FIFA World Youth Championship was also played between them; both Argentina goals in their 2–1 win were scored by Lionel Messi, who would go on to find the net for the senior team in the 2014 and 2018 World Cup fixtures.

The match-up holds some importance to many Nigerian football fans who regard the challenge as an important measuring stick for the development of Nigerian football. Argentine fans for their part, typically do not regard Nigeria as a rival. Although it means less to Argentine fans, matches against Nigeria are always seen as needing to be played with caution.

=== South Africa ===
In the 17 games that the Super Eagles have played against the Bafana Bafana, Nigeria have won seven games, drawn seven and lost two. This record forms the statistical backbone of one of Africa’s most recognizable football rivalries, a matchup shaped by competitive history, political symbolism, and repeated high‑stakes encounters. The rivalry intensified in the late 1990s and early 2000s, when Nigeria eliminated South Africa in the 2000 AFCON. Then, the two sides got drawn into the same group in the 2010 FIFA World Cup qualification – CAF second round, with the Nigerians winning each game that round in qualifying. In 2019 Africa Cup of Nations qualification Group E, Visitors South Africa stunned Nigeria in the opening game of the qualifiers in Uyo. In the return leg, the Eagles would only manage a draw, but both teams ended up reaching the final tournament in Egypt convincingly over the Seychelles and Libya. In the final matchday of 2015 Africa Cup of Nations qualification Group A, the Super Eagles needed a win vs. South Africa at home in Uyo to qualify. South Africa went 2-0 up, but Nigeria came back to get a draw via a Sone Aluko brace. Consequently, the defending champions would miss out on the 2015 Africa Cup of Nations. In the 2026 World Cup qualifiers, both sides played 1-1 draws in Uyo and Bloemfontein. South Africa qualified for their first World Cup in 16 years, topping the group with 18 points, and Nigeria finished second with 17 points. The Super Eagles ended up making the CAF second-placed playoffs, where they trashed Gabon 4-1 but lost to the Leopards of the DRC on penalties to miss back-to-back World Cups for the first time ever since their debut.

== Home stadium ==
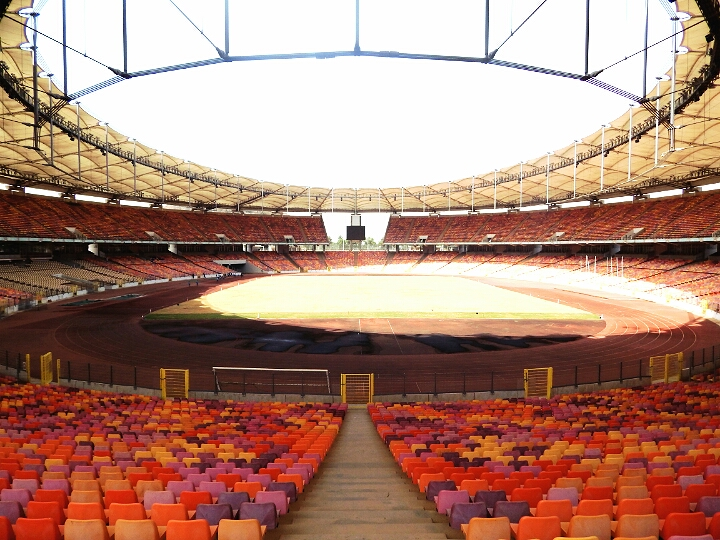
Abuja home stadium

The Moshood Abiola National Stadium (formerly known as National Stadium, Abuja) serves as the official home stadium of the Super Eagles. Several international matches are played in other stadiums across the country. However, since the construction of Godswill Akpabio International Stadium in Uyo, Akwa Ibom State, most of the Super Eagles' important home matches have been played there.

=== Super Eagles match venues ===
Stadium	Capacity	Commissioned	City	State/Territory	Ref
Godswill Akpabio International Stadium	30,000	2012	Uyo	Akwa Ibom	
Stephen Keshi Stadium	22,000	2018	Asaba	Delta	
Adokiye Amiesimaka Stadium	38,000	2015	Port Harcourt	Rivers	
Moshood Abiola National Stadium	60,491	2000	Abuja	FCT	
Lagos National Stadium	45,000	1972	Surulere	Lagos	
U. J. Esuene Stadium	16,000	1977	Calabar	Cross River	
Teslim Balogun Stadium	24,325	1984	Surulere	Lagos	
Obafemi Awolowo Stadium	25,000	1960	Ibadan	Oyo	
Sani Abacha Stadium	16,000	1998	Kano	Kano	
Ahmadu Bello Stadium	16,000	1965	Kaduna	Kaduna	
Nnamdi Azikiwe Stadium	22,000	1986	Enugu	Enugu	
Liberation Stadium	16,000		Port Harcourt	Rivers	

== Results and fixtures ==
The following is a list of football match results in the last 12 months, as well as any future matches that have been scheduled.

Win Draw Loss Fixture

=== 2025 ===
16 December 2025 Friendly	Egypt	2–1	Nigeria	Cairo, Egypt
20:00 UTC+2	Saber 28'; M. Mohamed 53'	Report	Awaziem 45+3'	Stadium: Cairo International Stadium; Referee: Mahmoud Nagy (Egypt)

23 December 2025 2025 AFCON GS	Nigeria	2–1	Tanzania	Fez, Morocco
18:30 UTC+1	Ajayi 36'; Lookman 52'	Report	M'Mombwa 50'	Stadium: Fez Stadium; Attendance: 11,444; Referee: Dahane Beida (Mauritania)

27 December 2025 2025 AFCON GS	Nigeria	3–2	Tunisia	Fez, Morocco
21:00 UTC+1	Osimhen 44'; Ndidi 50'; Lookman 67'	Report	Talbi 74'; Abdi 87' (pen.)	Stadium: Fez Stadium; Attendance: 25,544; Referee: Boubou Traore (Mali)

30 December 2025 2025 AFCON GS	Uganda	1–3	Nigeria	Fez, Morocco
17:00 UTC+1	Mato 75'	Report	Onuachu 28'; Onyedika 62', 67'	Stadium: Fez Stadium; Attendance: 11,545; Referee: Djindo Louis Houngnandande (Benin)

=== 2026 ===
5 January 2026 2025 AFCON R16	Nigeria	4–0	Mozambique	Fez, Morocco
20:00 UTC+1	Lookman 20'; Osimhen 25', 47'; Adams 75'	Report		Stadium: Fez Stadium; Attendance: 14,593; Referee: Abdou Abdel Mefire (Cameroon)

10 January 2026 2025 AFCON QF	Algeria	0–2	Nigeria	Marrakesh, Morocco
17:00 UTC+1		Report	Osimhen 47'; Adams 57'	Stadium: Marrakesh Stadium; Attendance: 32,452; Referee: Issa Sy (Senegal)

14 January 2026 2025 AFCON SF	Nigeria	0–0 (a.e.t.) (2–4 p)	Morocco	Rabat, Morocco
21:00 UTC+1		Report		Stadium: Prince Moulay Abdellah Stadium; Attendance: 65,458; Referee: Daniel Nii Laryea (Ghana)
	Penalties
	Onuachu (penalty scored); Chukwueze (penalty missed); Dele-Bashiru (penalty scored); Onyemaechi (penalty missed)		(penalty scored) El Aynaoui; (penalty missed) Igamane; (penalty scored) Ben Seghir; (penalty scored) Hakimi; (penalty scored) En-Nesyri

17 January 2026 2025 AFCON 3rd	Egypt	0–0 (2–4 p)	Nigeria	Casablanca, Morocco
17:00 UTC+1		Report		Stadium: Mohammed V Stadium; Attendance: 38,113; Referee: Jalal Jayed (Morocco)
	Penalties
	Salah (penalty missed); Marmoush (penalty missed); Rabia (penalty scored); Saber (penalty scored)		(penalty missed) Dele-Bashiru; (penalty scored) Adams; (penalty scored) Simon; (penalty scored) Iwobi; (penalty scored) Lookman

27 March 2026 2026 Jordan International Tournament	Iran	1–2	Nigeria	Antalya, Turkey (Note: The four nation tournament between Jordan, Iran, Nigeria, and Costa Rica were moved from Amman, Jordan to Antalya, Turkey due to the travel restrictions from the 2026 Iran war.)
16:00 UTC+3	Taremi 67'	Report	Simon 7'; Adams 51'	Stadium: Corendon Airlines Park; Attendance: 0 Referee: Cihan Aydın (Turkey)

31 March 2026 2026 Jordan International Tournament	Jordan	2–2	Nigeria	Antalya, Turkey
20:30 UTC+3	Al-Taamari 17'; Al-Dawoud 77'	Report	Simon 25'; Fernandez 41'	Stadium: Mardan Sports Complex; Attendance: 0 Referee: Atilla Karaoğlan (Turkey)

26 May 2026 2026 Unity Cup SF	Nigeria	2–0	Zimbabwe	London, England
19:30 UTC+1	Azeez 5', 62'	Report		Stadium: The Valley; Referee: John Brooks (England)

30 May 2026 2026 Unity Cup F	Nigeria	3–0	Jamaica	London, England
19:30 UTC+1	Yusuf 3', 90'; Moffi 59'	Report		Stadium: The Valley; Referee: Sam Barrott (England)

3 June 2026 Friendly	Poland	2–2	Nigeria	Warsaw, Poland
20:45 UTC+2	Potulski 45+1'; Wiśniewski 90+5'	Report	Moffi 23'; Onuachu 77' (pen.)	Stadium: Stadion Narodowy; Attendance: 54,408; Referee: Marian Barbu (Romania)

10 June 2026 Friendly	Portugal	2–1	Nigeria	Leiria, Portugal
20:45 UTC+1	Neto 23'; Conceição 75'	Report	Adams 37'	Stadium: Estádio Dr. Magalhães Pessoa; Attendance: 21,049; Referee: Mateo Busquets Ferrer (Spain)

25 September 2026 2027 AFCON qualification	Nigeria	2–1	Madagascar	Uyo, Nigeria
17:00 UTC+1	Ilenikhena 45+1'; Usor 65'	Report	Kari 16'	Stadium: Godswill Akpabio International Stadium; Referee: Alhadji Allaou Mahamat (Chad)

29 September 2026 2027 AFCON qualification	Guinea-Bissau	3–0	Nigeria	Bissau, Guinea-Bissau
16:00 UTC+0	Djú 15'; Baldé 66'; Djaló 90+5'	Report		Stadium: Estádio 24 de Setembro; Referee: Tewodros Mitiku (Ethiopia)

6 October 2026 Friendly	Russia	3–3	Nigeria	Nizhny Novgorod, Russia
19:00 UTC+3	Sadulayev 30'; Kislyak 45+2'; Miranchuk 54'	Report	Iheanacho 10'; Edokpolor 78'; Adams 90+4'	Stadium: Nizhny Novgorod Stadium; Referee: Nikola Dabanović (Montenegro)

13 November 2026 2027 AFCON qualification	Nigeria	3–1	Tanzania	Uyo, Nigeria
17:00 UTC+1	Yusuf 2'; Arokodare 52', 60'	Report	Msanga 32'	Stadium: Godswill Akpabio International Stadium; Referee: Jean-Jacques Ndala (Congo DR)

17 November 2026 2027 AFCON qualification	Tanzania	0–0	Nigeria	Zanzibar, Tanzania
16:00 UTC+3		Report		Stadium: Amaan Stadium; Referee: Athoumani Mohamed (Comoros)

=== 2027 ===
24 March 2027 2027 AFCON qualification	Madagascar	v	Nigeria	TBD, Madagascar
TBD				Stadium: TBD

28 March 2027 2027 AFCON qualification	Nigeria	v	Guinea-Bissau	TBD, Nigeria
TBD				Stadium: TBD

== Coaching staff ==
The current Nigerian (Super Eagles) managerial staff is made up of a technical adviser who serves as the coach in charge of full international matches and a chief coach who serves as the first assistant coach. The second assistant coach is in charge of the home-based team as well as the CHAN tournament and other home based competitions. Other positions also include the technical assistant and the goalkeeper trainer.

Position	Name
Technical director	(Nigeria) Augustine Eguavoen
Head coach	(Mali) Éric Chelle
Assistant coach	(France) Hedi Taboubi
Assistant coach	(Nigeria) Fidelis Ilechukwu
Assistant coach	(Nigeria) Daniel Ogunmodede
Goalkeeping coach	(France) Jean-Daniel Padovani
Fitness coach	(Slovenia) Tomaž Zorec
Video analyst	(Nigeria) Afolabi Adebayo
Match analyst	(Nigeria) Eboboritse Uwejamomere

=== Coaching history ===
Caretaker managers are listed in italics.

- (England) Jack Finch (1949)
- (Nigeria) Adewale Adegoke (1950–1952)
- (Nigeria) Daniel Anyiam (1954–1956, 1964–1965)
- (England) Les Courtier (1956–1960)
- (Israel) Jerry Beit haLevi (1960–1961)
- (Hungary) George Vardar (1961–1963)
- (Brazil) Jorge Penna (1963–1964, 1972–1973)
- (Hungary) József Ember (1965–1968)
- (Spain) Sabino Barinaga (1968–1969)
- (Nigeria) Peter Amaechina (1969–1970)
- (West Germany) Karl-Heinz Marotzke (1970–1972, 1973–1974)
- (Socialist Federal Republic of Yugoslavia) Tiko Jelisavčić (1974–1978)
- (Brazil) Otto Glória (1978–1981)
- (Germany) Gottlieb Göller (1981)
- (Nigeria) Adegboyega Onigbinde (1981–1984)
- (Nigeria) Chris Udemezue (1984–1986)
- (West Germany) Manfred Höner (1987–1988)
- (Nigeria) Paul Hamilton (1989)
- (Netherlands) Clemens Westerhof (1989–1994)
- (Nigeria) Shuaibu Amodu (1994–1995, 1996–1997, 2001–2002, 2008–2010, 2014)
- (Netherlands) Jo Bonfrère (1995–1996)
- (France) Philippe Troussier (1997)
- (Federal Republic of Yugoslavia) Bora Milutinović (1997–1998)
- (Netherlands) Thijs Libregts (1998–1999)
- (Netherlands) Jo Bonfrère (1999–2001)
- (Nigeria) Festus Onigbinde (2002)
- (Nigeria) Christian Chukwu (2003–2005)
- (Nigeria) Augustine Eguavoen (2005–2007, 2010, 2021–2022, 2024, 2024–2025)
- (Germany) Berti Vogts (2007–2008)
- (Sweden) Lars Lagerbäck (2010)
- (Nigeria) Samson Siasia (2010–2011, 2016)
- (Nigeria) Stephen Keshi (2011–2014, 2015)
- (Nigeria) Shuaibu Amodu (2015)
- (Nigeria) Sunday Oliseh (2015–2016)
- (Nigeria) Salisu Yusuf (2016)
- (Germany) Gernot Rohr (2016–2021)
- (Portugal) José Peseiro (2022–2024)
- (Nigeria) Finidi George (2024)
- (France) (Mali) Éric Chelle (2025–present)

== Players ==
=== Current squad ===
The following players were called up for the 2027 Africa Cup of Nations qualification matches against Tanzania on 13 and 17 November 2026 respectively.
Caps and goals correct as of 17 November 2026, after the match against Tanzania.

No.	Pos.	Player	Date of birth (age)	Caps	Goals	Club
1	GK	Francis Uzoho	28 October 1998 (age 28)	37	0	(Cyprus Football Association) Omonia
16	GK	Arthur Okonkwo	9 September 2001 (age 25)	2	0	(The Football Association) Charlton Athletic
23	GK	Stanley Nwabali	10 June 1996 (age 30)	38	0	(South African Football Association) Chippa United
2	DF	Ola Aina	8 October 1996 (age 30)	51	0	(The Football Association) Nottingham Forest
3	DF	Bruno Onyemaechi	3 April 1999 (age 27)	33	0	(Hellenic Football Federation) Olympiacos
5	DF	Benjamin Fredrick	28 May 2005 (age 21)	9	0	(The Football Association) Brentford
6	DF	Semi Ajayi	9 November 1993 (age 33)	61	2	(The Football Association) Hull City
12	DF	Bright Osayi-Samuel	31 December 1997 (age 28)	37	0	(The Football Association) Birmingham City
13	DF	Chibuike Nwaiwu	23 July 2003 (age 23)	3	0	(Turkish Football Federation) Trabzonspor
20	DF	Abdullahi Bewene	29 November 2004 (age 21)	5	0	(Football Association of the Czech Republic) Baník Ostrava
21	DF	Calvin Bassey	31 December 1999 (age 26)	49	1	(The Football Association) Fulham
4	MF	Wilfred Ndidi	16 December 1996 (age 29)	83	1	(Turkish Football Federation) Beşiktaş
8	MF	Samson Tijani	17 May 2002 (age 24)	3	0	(Slovak Football Association) Podbrezová
10	MF	Fisayo Dele-Bashiru	6 February 2001 (age 25)	21	2	(Italian Football Federation) Lazio
14	MF	Alhassan Yusuf	18 July 2000 (age 26)	13	3	(United States Soccer Federation) New England Revolution
17	MF	Alex Iwobi	3 May 1996 (age 30)	103	10	(The Football Association) Fulham
18	MF	Tochukwu Nnadi	30 June 2003 (age 23)	7	0	(French Football Federation) Marseille
24	MF	Mubarak Suleiman	13 April 2007 (age 19)	0	0	(Football Association of the Czech Republic) Slavia Prague
9	FW	Tolu Arokodare	23 November 2000 (age 25)	14	4	(Royal Dutch Football Association) Ajax
11	FW	Moses Usor	5 February 2002 (age 24)	4	1	(Austrian Football Association) LASK
15	FW	Moses Simon	12 July 1995 (age 31)	104	12	(French Football Federation) Paris
19	FW	Taiwo Awoniyi	12 August 1997 (age 29)	13	2	(The Football Association) Coventry City
22	FW	Akor Adams	29 January 2000 (age 26)	20	7	(Italian Football Federation) Venezia

=== Recent call-ups ===
The following players have also been called up to the Nigeria squad within the last twelve months.

Pos.	Player	Date of birth (age)	Caps	Goals	Club	Latest call-up
GK	Maduka Okoye	28 August 1999 (age 27)	21	0	(Italy) Udinese	v. Tanzania, 13 November 2026 ^{INJ}
GK	Samuel Friday James	5 April 2006 (age 20)	1	0	(Finland) SJK	v. Russia, 6 October 2026
GK	Michael Atata	23 October 2005 (age 21)	0	0	(Nigeria) Ikorodu City	v. Russia, 6 October 2026
GK	Adebayo Adeleye	17 May 2000 (age 26)	2	0	(Greece) Zakynthos	v. Jordan, 31 March 2026
GK	Amas Obasogie	27 December 1999 (age 26)	1	0	(Nigeria) Bendel Insurance	2025 Africa Cup of Nations
GK	Ebenezer Harcourt	21 October 2009 (age 17)	1	0	(Nigeria) Sporting Lagos	2025 Africa Cup of Nations ^{PRE}
DF	Emmanuel Fernandez	20 November 2001 (age 24)	4	1	(Scotland) Rangers	v. Russia, 6 October 2026
DF	Kenneth Igboke	27 July 2005 (age 21)	2	0	(Nigeria) Rangers International	v. Russia, 6 October 2026
DF	Isaac James	28 August 2004 (age 22)	1	0	(Portugal) Alverca	v. Russia, 6 October 2026
DF	Vince Osuji	6 April 2006 (age 20)	1	0	(Norway) Tromsø	v. Russia, 6 October 2026
DF	Akpe Victory	19 July 2006 (age 20)	0	0	(Switzerland) Basel	v. Madagascar, 25 September 2026 ^{WD}
DF	Zaidu Sanusi	13 June 1997 (age 29)	32	0	(Portugal) Porto	v. Portugal, 10 June 2026
DF	Christian Akpan	29 January 2005 (age 21)	1	0	(Belgium) Genk	v. Portugal, 10 June 2026
DF	Igoh Ogbu	8 February 2000 (age 26)	12	0	(Czech Republic) Slavia Prague	v. Portugal, 10 June 2026 ^{WD}
DF	Chibueze Oputa	17 October 2005 (age 21)	2	0	(Nigeria) Enugu Rangers	2026 Unity Cup, 26–30 May 2026
DF	Tijani Al-Ameen	17 March 2006 (age 20)	1	0	(Zimbabwe) Scottland	2026 Unity Cup, 26–30 May 2026
DF	Ochobi Elias	25 December 2007 (age 18)	0	0	(Nigeria) Rivers United	2026 Unity Cup, 26–30 May 2026
DF	Chidozie Awaziem	1 January 1997 (age 29)	40	2	(Turkey) Konyaspor	2025 Africa Cup of Nations
DF	Ryan Alebiosu	17 December 2001 (age 24)	1	0	(England) Blackburn Rovers	2025 Africa Cup of Nations
DF	William Troost-Ekong ^{RET}	1 September 1993 (age 33)	82	8	(Qatar) Al-Ahli	2025 Africa Cup of Nations ^{PRE}
DF	Olakunle Olusegun	23 April 2002 (age 24)	2	0	(Russia) Rostov	2025 Africa Cup of Nations ^{PRE}
DF	Adeleke Adekunle	27 July 2002 (age 24)	1	0	(Nigeria) Bendel Insurance	2025 Africa Cup of Nations ^{PRE}
DF	Felix Agu	27 September 1999 (age 27)	1	0	(Germany) Werder Bremen	2025 Africa Cup of Nations ^{PRE}
DF	Emmanuel Michael	16 June 2006 (age 20)	0	0	(Austria) LASK	2025 Africa Cup of Nations ^{PRE}
MF	Aderemi Adeoye	29 January 2007 (age 19)	3	0	(Nigeria) Ikorodu City	v. Russia, 6 October 2026
MF	Wilfred Igor	20 February 2005 (age 21)	1	0	(Norway) Kristiansund	v. Russia, 6 October 2026
MF	Stephen Michael	14 December 2006 (age 19)	1	0	(Denmark) Vendsyssel	v. Russia, 6 October 2026
MF	Chibuzo Nwoko	5 December 2005 (age 20)	1	0	(England) Fulham	v. Russia, 6 October 2026
MF	Frank Onyeka	1 January 1998 (age 28)	46	3	(England) Coventry City	v. Guinea-Bissau, 29 September 2026
MF	Raphael Onyedika	19 April 2001 (age 25)	27	3	(Germany) Eintracht Frankfurt	v. Guinea-Bissau, 29 September 2026
MF	Ridwan Popoola	14 November 2006 (age 20)	0	0	(United Arab Emirates) Al Wasl	v. Madagascar, 25 September 2026 ^{WD}
MF	Tosin Oyedokun	23 July 2002 (age 24)	2	0	(Libya) Al-Afreeki	2026 Unity Cup, 26–30 May 2026
MF	Ebenezer Akinsanmiro	25 November 2004 (age 21)	1	0	(Italy) Monza	2026 Unity Cup, 26–30 May 2026
MF	Ayobami Junior	24 December 1998 (age 27)	1	0	(Algeria) USM Khenchela	2026 Unity Cup, 26–30 May 2026
MF	Zadok Yohanna	29 June 2007 (age 19)	0	0	(England) Brighton & Hove Albion	2026 Unity Cup, 26–30 May 2026
MF	Chidera Ejuke	2 January 1998 (age 28)	14	1	(Spain) Sevilla	v. Jordan, 31 March 2026
MF	Yira Sor	24 July 2000 (age 26)	1	0	(Turkey) Amedspor	v. Jordan, 31 March 2026
MF	Muhammed Usman	2 March 1994 (age 32)	0	0	(Israel) Maccabi Bnei Reineh	2025 Africa Cup of Nations
MF	Peter Agba	20 December 2002 (age 23)	0	0	(Hungary) Győri ETO	2025 Africa Cup of Nations ^{PRE}
MF	Tom Dele-Bashiru	17 September 1999 (age 27)	0	0	(Greece) Aris Thessaloniki	2025 Africa Cup of Nations ^{PRE}
FW	Ademola Lookman	20 October 1997 (age 29)	46	11	(Spain) Atlético Madrid	v. Tanzania, 17 November 2026 ^{INJ}
FW	Victor Osimhen	29 December 1998 (age 27)	51	35	(Turkey) Galatasaray	v. Tanzania, 13 November 2026 ^{INJ}
FW	Kelechi Iheanacho	3 October 1996 (age 30)	59	15	(Turkey) Bursaspor	v. Russia, 6 October 2026
FW	Umar Abubakar	15 February 2006 (age 20)	1	0	(Portugal) Famalicão	v. Russia, 6 October 2026
FW	Peter Edokpolor	24 December 2006 (age 19)	1	1	(Portugal) Benfica	v. Russia, 6 October 2026
FW	Abdullahi Umar	16 January 2007 (age 19)	1	0	(Czech Republic) Hradec Králové	v. Russia, 6 October 2026
FW	Ibraheem Mahfus Ajasa	26 November 2005 (age 20)	0	0	(Russia) Rostov	v. Russia, 6 October 2026
FW	Samuel Chukwueze	22 May 1999 (age 27)	60	7	(Italy) AC Milan	v. Guinea-Bissau, 29 September 2026
FW	George Ilenikhena	16 August 2006 (age 20)	2	1	(Saudi Arabia) Al-Ittihad	v. Guinea-Bissau, 29 September 2026
FW	Paul Onuachu	28 May 1994 (age 32)	33	5	(Turkey) Trabzonspor	v. Portugal, 10 June 2026
FW	Terem Moffi	25 May 1999 (age 27)	23	6	(Germany) Hamburger SV	v. Portugal, 10 June 2026
FW	Philip Otele	15 April 1999 (age 27)	5	0	(Switzerland) Basel	v. Portugal, 10 June 2026
FW	Rafiu Durosinmi	1 January 2003 (age 23)	3	0	(Belgium) Genk	v. Portugal, 10 June 2026 ^{WD}
FW	Femi Azeez	5 June 2001 (age 25)	2	2	(England) Brighton & Hove Albion	2026 Unity Cup, 26–30 May 2026
FW	Owen Oseni	7 May 2003 (age 23)	1	0	(England) Plymouth Argyle	2026 Unity Cup, 26–30 May 2026
FW	Cyriel Dessers	8 December 1994 (age 31)	11	3	(Greece) Panathinaikos	2025 Africa Cup of Nations
FW	Salim Fago Lawal	15 January 2003 (age 23)	2	0	(Czech Republic) Viktoria Plzeň	2025 Africa Cup of Nations
FW	Victor Boniface	23 December 2000 (age 25)	13	1	(Germany) Bayer Leverkusen	2025 Africa Cup of Nations ^{PRE/INJ}
FW	Umar Sadiq	2 February 1997 (age 29)	12	1	(Spain) Valencia	2025 Africa Cup of Nations ^{PRE}
FW	Christantus Uche	19 May 2003 (age 23)	3	0	(Spain) Getafe	2025 Africa Cup of Nations ^{PRE}
FW	Nathan Tella	5 July 1999 (age 27)	2	0	(Germany) Bayer Leverkusen	2025 Africa Cup of Nations ^{PRE}
FW	Chisom Orji	5 April 2001 (age 25)	1	0	(Nigeria) Warri Wolves	2025 Africa Cup of Nations ^{PRE}
FW	Abdulrasheed Shehu Dabai	20 March 2006 (age 20)	0	0	(Nigeria) Rivers United	2025 Africa Cup of Nations ^{PRE}
FW	Chukwubuikem Ikwuemesi	5 August 2001 (age 25)	0	0	(Belgium) Oud-Heverlee Leuven	2025 Africa Cup of Nations ^{PRE}
FW	Ekeson Okorie	28 May 2004 (age 22)	0	0	(Rwanda) Police	2025 Africa Cup of Nations ^{PRE}
^{INJ} The player is not part of the current squad due to injury^{PRE} Preliminary squad/standby^{RET} Retired from the national team^{SUS} Serving suspension^{WD} Player withdrew from the squad due to non-injury issue.

== Player records ==
As of 17 November 2026
Statistics include official FIFA-recognised matches only.
Players in bold are still active with Nigeria.

=== Most appearances ===
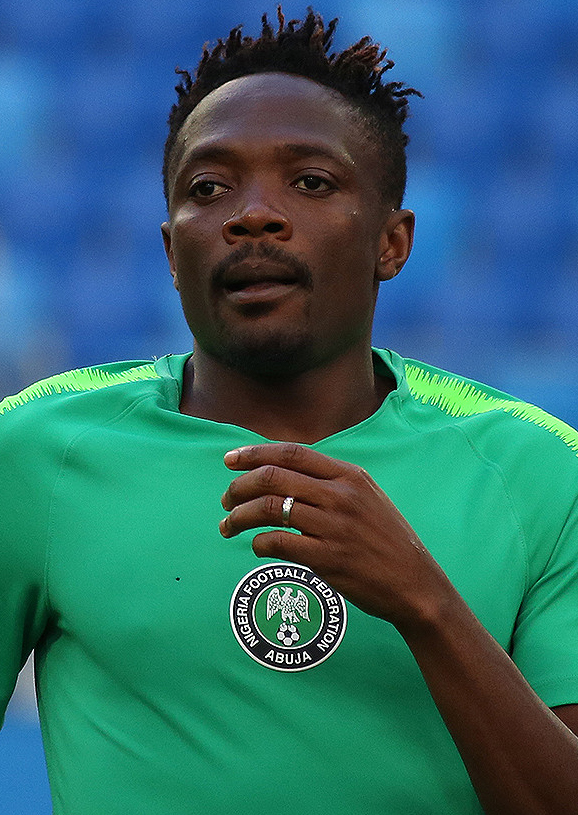
Ahmed Musa is Nigeria's most capped player with 110 appearances.

Rank	Player	Caps	Goals	Career
1	Ahmed Musa (Note: Musa also appeared in one match against Togo in 2017, scoring two goals, however Nigeria made nine substitutions during this match, and therefore it is not recognised as an official match by FIFA.)	110	16	2010–2025
2	**Moses Simon**	104	12	2015–present
3	**Alex Iwobi** (Note: Also appeared in one match against Togo in 2017, however Nigeria made nine substitutions during this match, and therefore it is not recognised as an official match by FIFA.)	103	10	2015–present
4	Vincent Enyeama	101	0	2002–2015
4	Joseph Yobo	101	7	2001–2014
6	Mikel John Obi	91	6	2005–2019
7	Nwankwo Kanu	86	12	1994–2011
7	Mudashiru Lawal	86	11	1975–1985
9	**Wilfred Ndidi**	83	1	2015–present
10	William Troost-Ekong	82	8	2015–2025

=== Top goalscorers ===
Rank	Player	Goals	Caps	Ratio	Career
1	Rashidi Yekini	37	62	0.6	1983–1998
2	**Victor Osimhen**	35	51	0.69	2017–present
3	Segun Odegbami	22	47	0.47	1976–1981
4	Yakubu Aiyegbeni	21	58	0.36	2000–2012
5	Ikechukwu Uche	19	46	0.41	2007–2014
6	Obafemi Martins	18	42	0.43	2004–2015
7	Samson Siasia	17	49	0.35	1984–1998
8	Odion Ighalo	16	37	0.43	2015–2022
8	Ahmed Musa	16	110	0.15	2010–2025
10	**Kelechi Iheanacho** (Note: Iheanacho also appeared in one match against Togo in 2017, scoring one goal, however Nigeria made nine substitutions during this match, and therefore it is not recognised as an official match by FIFA.)	15	59	0.25	2015–present

== Competitive record ==
=== FIFA World Cup ===
FIFA World Cup record										Qualification record						
Year	Round	Position	Pld	W	D	L	GF	GA	Squad	Pld	W	D	L	GF	GA	Total
(Uruguay) 1930	Part of United Kingdom									Part of United Kingdom						
1934 to 1958	Not a FIFA member									Not a FIFA member						
(Chile) 1962	Did not qualify									2	0	1	1	3	6	1962
(England) 1966	Withdrew (Note: All African nations withdrew due to a lack of qualifying berths.)									Withdrew						
(Mexico) 1970	Did not qualify									8	3	4	1	15	12	1970
(West Germany) 1974	Did not qualify									4	1	2	1	3	4	1974
(Argentina) 1978	Did not qualify									8	3	3	2	17	8	1978
(Spain) 1982	Did not qualify									8	3	2	3	8	8	1982
(Mexico) 1986	Did not qualify									6	5	0	1	11	3	1986
(Italy) 1990	Did not qualify									6	3	1	2	7	5	1990
(United States) 1994	Round of 16	9th	4	2	0	2	7	4	Squad	8	5	2	1	17	5	1994
(France) 1998	Round of 16	12th	4	2	0	2	6	9	Squad	6	4	1	1	10	4	1998
(South Korea) (Japan) 2002	Group stage	27th	3	0	1	2	1	3	Squad	10	6	2	2	19	3	2002
(Germany) 2006	Did not qualify									10	6	3	1	21	7	2006
(South Africa) 2010	Group stage	27th	3	0	1	2	3	5	Squad	12	9	3	0	20	5	2010
(Brazil) 2014	Round of 16	16th	4	1	1	2	3	5	Squad	8	5	3	0	11	4	2014
(Russia) 2018	Group stage	21st	3	1	0	2	3	4	Squad	8	5	2	1	13	6	2018
(Qatar) 2022	Did not qualify									8	4	3	1	10	4	2022
(Canada) (Mexico) (United States) 2026	Did not qualify									12	5	6	1	20	10	2026
(Morocco) (Portugal) (Spain) 2030	To be determined									To be determined						
(Saudi Arabia) 2034	To be determined									To be determined						
Total	Round of 16	6/16	21	6	3	12	23	30	—	124	67	38	19	205	94	–

=== Africa Cup of Nations ===
Africa Cup of Nations record										Qualification record					
Year	Round	Position	Pld	W	D*	L	GF	GA	Squad	Pld	W	D*	L	GF	GA
(Sudan) 1957	Not affiliated to CAF									Not affiliated to CAF					
(United Arab Republic) 1959	Not affiliated to CAF									Not affiliated to CAF					
(Ethiopia) 1962	Withdrew									4	1	2	1	4	5
(Ghana) 1963	Group stage	6th	2	0	0	2	3	10	Squad	2	0	1	1	2	3
(Tunisia) 1965	Withdrew									Withdrew					
(Ethiopia) 1968	Did not qualify									4	1	1	2	4	5
(Sudan) 1970	Withdrew									Withdrew					
(Cameroon) 1972	Did not qualify									2	0	1	1	1	2
(Egypt) 1974	Did not qualify									4	2	1	1	7	9
(Ethiopia) 1976	Third place	3rd	6	3	1	2	11	10	Squad	2	2	0	0	3	1
(Ghana) 1978	Third place	3rd	5	2	2	1	8	5	Squad	4	2	1	1	7	4
(Nigeria) 1980	Champions	1st	5	4	1	0	8	1	Squad	Qualified as hosts					
(Libya) 1982	Group stage	6th	3	1	0	2	4	5	Squad	Qualified as holders					
(Ivory Coast) 1984	Runners-up	2nd	5	1	3	1	7	8	Squad	4	1	2	1	2	1
(Egypt) 1986	Did not qualify									2	0	1	1	0	1
(Morocco) 1988	Runners-up	2nd	5	1	3	1	5	3	Squad	4	2	1	1	6	3
(Algeria) 1990	Runners-up	2nd	5	3	0	2	5	6	Squad	4	2	2	0	8	2
(Senegal) 1992	Third place	3rd	5	4	0	1	8	5	Squad	8	4	3	1	15	3
(Tunisia) 1994	Champions	1st	5	3	2	0	9	3	Squad	6	3	2	1	12	1
(South Africa) 1996	Withdrew									Qualified as holders					
(Burkina Faso) 1998	Banned									Banned					
(Ghana) (Nigeria) 2000	Runners-up	2nd	6	4	2	0	12	5	Squad	Qualified as hosts					
(Mali) 2002	Third place	3rd	6	4	1	1	5	2	Squad	6	4	2	0	9	1
(Tunisia) 2004	Third place	3rd	6	4	1	1	11	5	Squad	4	2	2	0	7	3
(Egypt) 2006	Third place	3rd	6	4	1	1	7	3	Squad	10	6	3	1	21	7
(Ghana) 2008	Quarter-finals	7th	4	1	1	2	3	3	Squad	6	5	0	1	10	3
(Angola) 2010	Third place	3rd	6	3	1	2	6	4	Squad	12	9	3	0	20	5
(Equatorial Guinea) (Gabon) 2012	Did not qualify									6	3	2	1	12	5
(South Africa) 2013	Champions	1st	6	4	2	0	11	4	Squad	4	2	2	0	10	3
(Equatorial Guinea) 2015	Did not qualify									6	2	2	2	9	7
(Gabon) 2017	Did not qualify									4	1	2	1	2	2
(Egypt) 2019	Third place	3rd	7	5	0	2	9	7	Squad	6	4	1	1	14	6
(Cameroon) 2021	Round of 16	9th	4	3	0	1	6	2	Squad	6	4	2	0	14	7
(Ivory Coast) 2023	Runners-up	2nd	7	4	2	1	8	4	Squad	6	5	0	1	22	4
(Morocco) 2025	Third place	3rd	7	5	2	0	14	4	Squad	6	3	2	1	9	3
(Kenya) (Tanzania) (Uganda) 2027	To be determined									To be determined					
2028	To be determined									To be determined					
Total	3 Titles	21/35	110	63	24	23	160	99	—	132	70	41	21	230	96

*Denotes draws including knockout matches decided via a penalty shoot-out.
**Red border colour indicates tournament was held on home soil.

=== African Nations Championship ===
African Nations Championship record									Qualification record					
Year	Round	Position	Pld	W	D*	L	GF	GA						
(Ivory Coast) 2009	Did not qualify													
(Sudan) 2011	Did not qualify													
(South Africa) 2014	3rd place	3rd	6	4	1	1	12	8	2	1	0	1	4	3
(Rwanda) 2016	Group stage	10th	3	1	1	1	5	3						
(Morocco) 2018	Runners-up	2nd	6	4	1	1	7	6						
(Cameroon) 2020	Did not qualify													
(Algeria) 2022	Did not qualify													
(Uganda) 2024	Group stage	3rd	3	2	1	0	8	4'						
Total	Runners-up	3/7	15	8	4	3	24	17						

=== WAFU Nations Cup ===
WAFU Nations Cup record
Year	Round	Position	Pld	W	D	L	GF	GA
(Nigeria) 2010	Champions	1st	5	5	0	0	14	
(Nigeria) 2011	Runners-up	2nd	4	1	0	0	9	
(Ghana) 2013	Did not enter							
(Ghana) 2017	Runners-up	2nd	4	1	0	0	9	
(Senegal) 2019	Quarter-finals							
Total	1 Title	3/4	13	7	0	0	32	9

=== FIFA Confederations Cup ===
FIFA Confederations Cup record
Year	Round	Position	Pld	W	D*	L	GF	GA	Squad
(Saudi Arabia) 1992	Did not qualify								
(Saudi Arabia) 1995	Fourth place	4th	3	1	2	0	4	1	Squad
(Saudi Arabia) 1997	Did not qualify								
(Mexico) 1999	Did not qualify								
(South Korea) (Japan) 2001	Did not qualify								
(France) 2003	Did not qualify								
(Germany) 2005	Did not qualify								
(South Africa) 2009	Did not qualify								
(Brazil) 2013	Group stage	5th	3	1	0	2	7	6	Squad
(Russia) 2017	Did not qualify								
Total	Fourth place	2/10	6	2	2	2	11	7	-

=== Olympic Games ===
Olympic Games record
Appearances: 3
Year	Round	Position	Pld	W	D	L	GF	GA
1900–1948	Part of Great Britain							
(Finland) 1952	Did not enter							
(Australia) 1956	Did not enter							
(Italy) 1960	Did not qualify							
(Japan) 1964	Did not qualify							
(Mexico) 1968	Group stage	14th	3	0	1	2	4	9
(Germany) 1972	Did not qualify							
(Canada) 1976	Withdrew after qualifying							
(Soviet Union) 1980	Group stage	13th	3	0	1	2	2	5
(United States) 1984	Did not qualify							
(South Korea) 1988	Group stage	15th	3	0	0	3	1	8
(Spain) 1992	Banned							
Since 1992	See Nigeria national under-23 football team							
Total	Group stage	3/19	9	0	2	7	7	22

=== African Games ===
African Games record
Year	Result	Pld	W	D	L	GF	GA
(Nigeria) 1973	Gold medalists	5	4	1	0	14	7
(Algeria) 1978	Silver medalists	5	2	2	1	4	2
Total	2/4	0	0	0	0	0	0

== Honours ==
=== Intercontinental ===
- Afro-Asian Cup of Nations
  - (gold) Champions (1): 1995

=== Continental ===
- CAF African Cup of Nations
  - Champions (3): 1980, 1994, 2013
  - Runners-up (5): 1984, 1988, 1990, 2000, 2023
  - Third place (9): 1976, 1978, 1992, 2002, 2004, 2006, 2010, 2019, 2025
- CAF African Nations Championship
  - Runners-up (1): 2018
  - Third place (1): 2014
- African Games^{1}
  - Gold medal (1): 1973
  - Silver medal (1): 1978

=== Regional ===
- WAFU Nations Cup
  - (gold) Champions (1): 2010
  - (silver) Runners-up (2): 2011, 2017
- West African Nations Cup
  - (bronze) Third place (1): 1987
- CEDEAO Cup
  - (gold) Champions (2): 1977, 1990
  - (silver) Runners-up (1): 1983

=== Friendly ===
- Unity World Cup
  - Champions (1): 2014
- WAFU Unity Cup
  - Runners-up (1): 2005
- Ethiopia Tournament
  - Runners-up (1): 1992
- Lunar New Year Cup
  - Champions (1): 1998
- Catalonia International Trophy
  - Champions (1): 2012
- LG Cup
  - Champions (1): 2003
- Unity Cup
  - Champions (4): 2002, 2004, 2025, 2026

=== Awards ===
- FIFA Best Mover of the Year (1): 2000
- World Soccer Team of the Year (1): 1996
- African National Team of the Year (3): 1993, 1994, 2013

=== Summary ===
Competition	1st place, gold medalist(s)	2nd place, silver medalist(s)	3rd place, bronze medalist(s)	Total
CAF African Cup of Nations	3	5	9	17
CAF African Nations Championship	0	1	1	2
Afro-Asian Cup of Nations	1	0	0	1
Total	4	6	9	19

Notes

1. Competition organized by ANOCA, officially not recognized by FIFA.

== See also ==
- Nigeria national under-23 football team
- Nigeria national under-20 football team
- Nigeria national under-17 football team
- Nigeria national futsal team
- Nigeria national beach soccer team
- Nigeria women's national football team
- Nigeria women's national under-20 football team
- Nigeria women's national under-17 football team
