= Unity Cup =

- Region: AFC, CAF, CONCACAF & UEFA
- Teams: 4
- Current champions: Nigeria (4th title)
- Most championships: Nigeria (4 titles)
- Website: unitycup.com
- 2026 Unity Cup

The Unity Cup is an international football tournament held in London, England. All the competitors represent countries with large diasporas in London.

Nigeria are the defending champions, having defeated Jamaica in the 2026 final.

== Results ==
Ed.	Year	Host	Final			Third place play-off			No. of teams
Ed.	Year	Host	Champions	Score	Runners-up	Third place	Score	Fourth place	No. of teams
1	2002	England	Nigeria	1–0	Jamaica	—			2
2	2004	England	Nigeria	^{RR}	Republic of Ireland	Jamaica	—		3
3	2025	England	Nigeria	2–2 (5–4 p)	Jamaica	Ghana	4–0	Trinidad and Tobago	4
4	2026	England	Nigeria	3–0	Jamaica	Zimbabwe	1–0	India	4

== Tournament summary ==
Champions
Runners-up
Third place
Fourth place

For each tournament, the number of teams in brackets is shown.

Teams (7)	(England) 2002 (2)	(England) 2004 (3)	(England) 2025 (4)	(England) 2026 (4)	Times participated
Ghana	•	•	3rd	•	1
India	•	•	•	4th	1
Jamaica	2nd	3rd	2nd	2nd	4
Nigeria	1st	1st	1st	1st	4
Republic of Ireland	•	2nd	•	•	1
Trinidad and Tobago	•	•	4th	•	1
Zimbabwe	•	•	•	3rd	1

Notes:
• – Not invited

== See also ==
- King's Cup
- Merdeka Tournament
- Tri-Nation Series
- Intercontinental Cup
