= Éric Chelle =

French manager and former Malian footballer (born 1977)

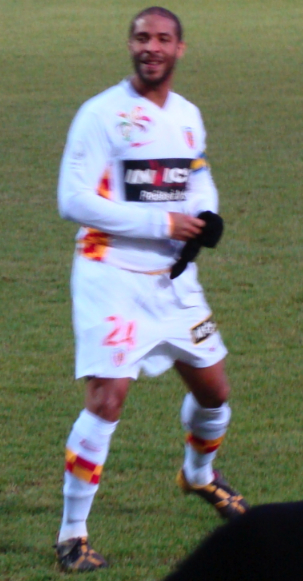
- Chelle with Lens in 2009

Personal information
- Full name: Éric Sékou Chelle
- Date of birth: 11 November 1977 (age 49)
- Place of birth: Abidjan, Ivory Coast
- Height: 1.75 m (5 ft 9 in)
- Position: Centre-back

Team information
- Current team: Nigeria (head coach)

Senior career*
Years	Team	Apps	(Gls)
1998–2003	Martigues	74	(0)
2003–2008	Valenciennes	142	(10)
2008–2011	Lens	82	(0)
2011–2013	Istres	60	(1)
2013–2014	Chamois Niortais	17	(0)
Total		375	(11)

International career
2004–2006	Mali	5	(0)

Managerial career
- 2014–2016: GS Consolat (assistant manager)
- 2016–2017: GS Consolat
- 2017–2021: FC Martigues
- 2021: Boulogne
- 2022–2024: Mali
- 2024–2025: MC Oran
- 2025–: Nigeria
Medal record
Men's football
Representing Nigeria (as manager)
Africa Cup of Nations
Third place	2025 Morocco
- * Club domestic league appearances and goals

Éric Sékou Chelle (born 11 November 1977) is a football manager and former player who played for the Malian national team, and currently serves as head coach of the Nigeria national football team and mainly played as a centre-back. Born in Ivory Coast to a French father and a Malian mother, he made five appearances for the Mali national team.

== Playing career ==
Chelle was born in the Ivory Coast to a French father and Malian mother, and was raised in France. He holds Malian, French and Ivorian citizenship. He spent his whole career in France, appearing for Martigues, Valenciennes, Lens, Istres, and Chamois Niortais. At international level, he represented Mali.

== Coaching career ==
In May 2021, he was appointed head coach of US Boulogne. He was dismissed by Boulogne on 11 December 2021, after the club gained three points in preceding ten games.

In 2022, Chelle was appointed manager of Mali. Under his guidance at the 2023 Africa Cup of Nations, Mali topped their group ahead of eventual semifinalists South Africa and reached the quarter finals against hosts Ivory Coast, where they were eliminated in the very last minute of extra time. He was dismissed on 13 June 2024.

On 9 October 2024, Éric Chelle became the coach of MC Oran in the Algerian Ligue 1 Pro.

On 7 January 2025, Chelle was announced by the Nigeria Football Federation as the head coach of the Nigeria Senior Football National Team, the Super Eagles.

In December 2025–January 2026, he led Nigeria to a bronze medal at the 2025 Africa Cup of Nations. In June 2026, he had his contract renewed and was given the job of the Olympic Eagles, Nigeria's under-23 side.

== Managerial statistics ==
As of 17 November 2026

Managerial record by team and tenure
Team	From	To	Record				
Team	From	To	P	W	D	L	Win %
GS Consolat	17 September 2016	30 June 2017	30	16	6	8	53.33
FC Martigues	1 November 2017	10 May 2021	80	35	24	21	43.75
Boulogne	21 May 2021	11 December 2021	16	2	5	9	12.50
Mali	6 May 2022	13 June 2024	22	14	5	3	63.64
MC Oran	9 October 2024	11 January 2025	13	6	2	5	46.15
Nigeria	7 January 2025	Present	29	16	11	2	55.17
Total			175	79	51	45	45.14

== Honours ==
=== Player ===
FC Valenciennes

- Ligue 2: 2005–06

RC Lens

- Ligue 2: 2008–09

=== Manager ===
Nigeria

- Unity Cup: 2025, 2026
- Africa Cup of Nations third place: 2025
