= 2025 Unity Cup =

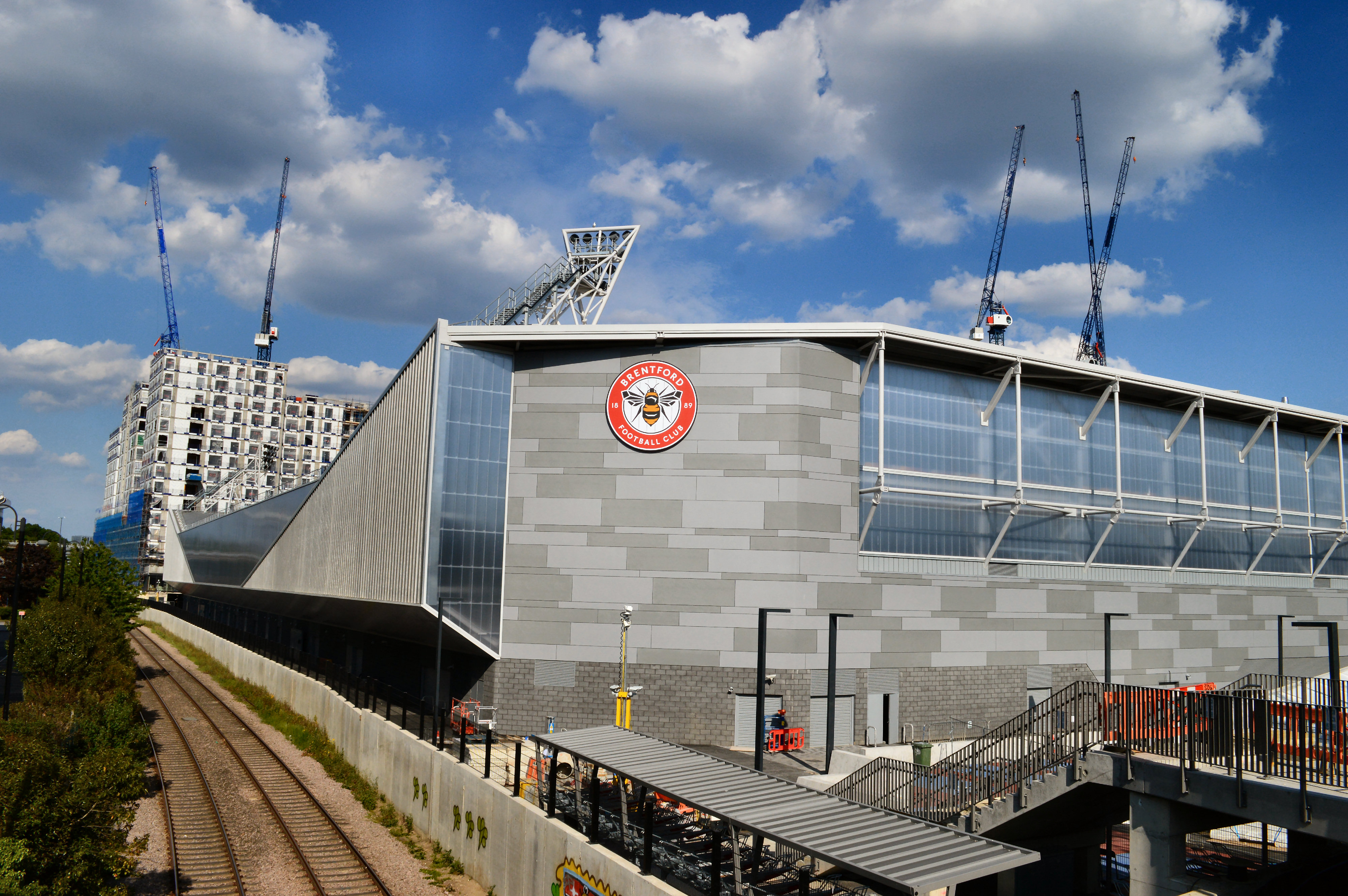
- The Brentford Community Stadium hosted the tournament

Tournament details
- Host country: England
- City: London
- Dates: 27 – 31 May
- Teams: 4
- Venue: Brentford Community Stadium

Final positions
- Champions: Nigeria (3rd title)
- Runners-up: Jamaica
- Third place: Ghana
- Fourth place: Trinidad and Tobago

Tournament statistics
- Matches played: 4
- Goals scored: 16 (4 per match)
- Top scorer(s): Fifteen players (1 goal each)

The 2025 Unity Cup was the third edition of the Unity Cup, an international football tournament. It was held in May at the Brentford Community Stadium in London, England. Ghana, Jamaica, Nigeria, and Trinidad and Tobago were the competing sides, with all competitors representing countries with large diasporas in London.

Nigeria were the defending champions, and retained the cup after defeating Jamaica 5–4 on penalties after a 2–2 draw.

== Matches ==
=== Bracket ===
Semi-finals
27 May
Jamaica	3
Trinidad and Tobago	2
28 May
Nigeria	2
Ghana	1

Final
31 May
Jamaica	2 (4)
Nigeria	2 (5)
Third place
31 May
Trinidad and Tobago	0
Ghana	4

=== Semi-finals ===
27 May 2025
19:45

Jamaica	3–2	Trinidad and Tobago
Palmer 25' (pen.); Burrell 53'; King 90+3' (pen.)	Report	Leacock 54'; Molino 69'

Brentford Community Stadium, London
Referee: Sam Barrott (England)
28 May 2025
19:45

Nigeria	2–1	Ghana
Dessers 14'; Simpson 19' (o.g.)	Report	Thomas-Asante 70'

Brentford Community Stadium, London
Referee: Stuart Attwell (England)

=== Third place play-off ===
31 May 2025
12:30

Trinidad and Tobago	0–4	Ghana
	Report	Ayew 6'; Simpson 12'; Fuseini 41'; Agyekum 58'

Brentford Community Stadium, London
Referee: Sam Barrott (England)

=== Final ===
31 May 2025
17:00

Jamaica	2–2	Nigeria
Dixon 12'; Russell 63'	Report	Simon 9'; Chukwueze 53'
Penalties
King (penalty scored); Hayden (penalty scored); Morrison (penalty scored); Atkinson (penalty missed); Bell (penalty scored)	4–5	(penalty scored) Iheanacho; (penalty scored) Simon; (penalty scored) Arokodare; (penalty scored) Onyemaechi; (penalty scored) Uche

Brentford Community Stadium, London
Referee: Stuart Attwell (England)

== Winners ==
2025 Unity Cup winners

Nigeria
Third title

== Squads ==
=== Ghana ===
The following players were named to the squad.

No.	Pos.	Player	Date of birth (age)	Club
1	GK	Lawrence Ati-Zigi	29 November 1996 (aged 28)	(Swiss Football Association) St. Gallen
2	DF	Kamaradini Mamudu	4 November 2002 (aged 22)	(Ghana Football Association) Medeama
3	DF	Aaron Essel	30 December 2005 (aged 19)	(United States Soccer Federation) North Texas
4	DF	Razak Simpson	15 July 1998 (aged 26)	(Ghana Football Association) Nations
5	MF	Caleb Yirenkyi	15 January 2006 (aged 19)	(Danish Football Association) Nordsjælland
6	DF	Mohammed Salisu	17 April 1999 (aged 26)	(French Football Federation) Monaco (Note: Monaco is a Monégasque club playing in the French football league system.)
7	FW	Aziz Issah	20 November 2005 (aged 19)	(Royal Spanish Football Federation) Barcelona Atlètic
8	MF	Majeed Ashimeru	10 October 1997 (aged 27)	(Royal Belgian Football Association) Anderlecht
9	FW	Jordan Ayew	11 September 1991 (aged 33)	(The Football Association) Leicester City
11	FW	Kwame Opoku	8 May 1999 (aged 26)	(Ghana Football Association) Asante Kotoko
12	GK	Joseph Anang	8 June 2000 (aged 24)	(Football Association of Ireland) St Patrick's Athletic
13	MF	Ibrahim Sulemana	22 May 2003 (aged 22)	(Italian Football Federation) Atalanta
14	DF	Gideon Mensah	18 July 1998 (aged 26)	(French Football Federation) Auxerre
15	MF	Lawrence Agyekum	23 November 2003 (aged 21)	(Royal Belgian Football Association) Cercle Brugge
16	GK	Benjamin Asare	13 July 1999 (aged 25)	(Ghana Football Association) Hearts of Oak
17	FW	Mohammed Fuseini	16 May 2002 (aged 23)	(Royal Belgian Football Association) Union Saint-Gilloise
18	DF	Stephan Ambrosius	18 December 1998 (aged 26)	(Swiss Football Association) St. Gallen
19	FW	Felix Afena-Gyan	19 January 2003 (aged 22)	(Italian Football Federation) Juventus Next Gen
20	DF	Ebenezer Annan	21 August 2002 (aged 22)	(Football Association of Serbia) Red Star Belgrade
21	MF	Salis Abdul Samed	26 March 2000 (aged 25)	(The Football Association) Sunderland
22	MF	Christopher Bonsu Baah	14 December 2004 (aged 20)	(Royal Belgian Football Association) Genk
23	FW	Brandon Thomas-Asante	28 December 1998 (aged 26)	(The Football Association) Coventry City
27	MF	Abu Francis	27 April 2001 (aged 24)	(Royal Belgian Football Association) Cercle Brugge

=== Nigeria ===
The squad included the following players.

No.	Pos.	Player	Date of birth (age)	Club
1	GK	Maduka Okoye	28 August 1999 (aged 25)	(Italian Football Federation) Udinese
2	DF	Sodiq Ismail	2 August 2003 (aged 21)	(Nigeria Football Federation) Reml Stars
3	DF	Benjamin Fredrick	28 May 2005 (aged 19)	(The Football Association) Brentford
4	MF	Wilfred Ndidi	16 December 1996 (aged 28)	(The Football Association) Leicester City
5	DF	Igoh Ogbu	8 February 2000 (aged 25)	(Football Association of the Czech Republic) Slavia Prague
6	DF	Semi Ajayi	9 November 1993 (aged 31)	(The Football Association) West Bromwich Albion
7	MF	Christantus Uche	19 May 2003 (aged 22)	(Royal Spanish Football Federation) Getafe
7	FW	Ahmed Musa	14 October 1992 (aged 32)	(Nigeria Football Federation) Kano Pillars
8	MF	Frank Onyeka	1 January 1998 (aged 27)	(German Football Association) FC Augsburg
9	FW	Cyriel Dessers	8 December 1994 (aged 30)	(Scottish Football Association) Rangers
10	FW	Tolu Arokodare	23 November 2000 (aged 24)	(Royal Belgian Football Association) Genk
11	FW	Samuel Chukwueze	22 May 1999 (aged 26)	(Italian Football Federation) Milan
12	MF	Papa Mustapha Daniel	1 January 2002 (aged 23)	(Nigeria Football Federation) Niger Tornadoes
13	DF	Bruno Onyemaechi	3 April 1999 (aged 26)	(Hellenic Football Federation) Olympiacos
14	FW	Kelechi Iheanacho	3 August 1996 (aged 28)	(The Football Association) Leicester City
15	FW	Moses Simon	12 May 1995 (aged 30)	(French Football Federation) Nantes
16	GK	Amas Obasogie	27 December 1999 (aged 25)	(Tanzania Football Federation) Singida Big Stars
17	DF	Nduka Junior	1 August 2003 (aged 21)	(Nigeria Football Federation) Remo Stars
18	FW	Sikiru Alimi	23 March 1996 (aged 29)	(Nigeria Football Federation) Remo Stars
19	FW	Nathan Tella	5 July 1999 (aged 25)	(German Football Association) Bayer Leverkusen
20	DF	Ifeanyi Onyebuchi	4 April 2000 (aged 25)	(Nigeria Football Federation) Rangers International
21	DF	Felix Agu	27 September 1997 (aged 27)	(German Football Association) Werder Bremen
22	MF	Chinemerem Ugwueze	20 May 2001 (aged 24)	(Nigeria Football Federation) Rangers International
23	GK	Stanley Nwabali	10 June 1996 (aged 28)	(South African Football Association) Chippa United
24	MF	Saviour Isaac	1 January 2002 (aged 23)	(Nigeria Football Federation) Rangers International
25	DF	Waliu Ojetoye	29 April 2004 (aged 21)	(Nigeria Football Federation) Ikorodu City

=== Jamaica ===
The following players were named to the squad.

No.	Pos.	Player	Date of birth (age)	Club
1	GK	Benjamin Williams	12 July 1999 (aged 25)	(Jamaica Football Federation) Portmore United
2	DF	Dexter Lembikisa	4 November 2003 (aged 21)	(The Football Association) Barnsley
3	DF	Amari'i Bell	5 May 1994 (aged 31)	(The Football Association) Luton Town
4	DF	Mason Holgate	22 October 1996 (aged 28)	(The Football Association) West Bromwich Albion
5	DF	Stephen Young	22 July 2001 (aged 23)	(Jamaica Football Federation) Portmore United
6	DF	Richard King	27 November 2001 (aged 23)	(Jamaica Football Federation) Cavalier
7	MF	Brandon Cover	25 September 2003 (aged 21)	(The Football Association) Fleetwood Town
8	MF	Kasey Palmer	9 November 1996 (aged 28)	(The Football Association) Hull City
9	FW	Kaheim Dixon	4 October 2004 (aged 20)	(The Football Association) Charlton Athletic
10	MF	Ravel Morrison	2 February 1993 (aged 32)	(United Arab Emirates Football Association) Precision
11	MF	Daniel Green	10 June 1997 (aged 27)	(Jamaica Football Federation) Mount Pleasant
12	FW	Dwayne Atkinson	5 May 2002 (aged 23)	(Jamaica Football Federation) Cavalier
13	GK	Shaquan Davis	11 November 2000 (aged 24)	(Jamaica Football Federation) Mount Pleasant
14	MF	Isaac Hayden	22 March 1995 (aged 30)	(The Football Association) Portsmouth
15	FW	Malik Mothersille	23 October 2003 (age 22)	(The Football Association) Peterborough United
16	DF	Sue-Lae McCalla	24 November 1992 (aged 32)	(Jamaica Football Federation) Mount Pleasant
17	FW	Rumarn Burrell	16 December 2000 (aged 24)	(The Football Association) Burton Albion
18	MF	Jon Russell	9 October 2000 (aged 24)	(The Football Association) Barnsley
19	DF	Kyle Ming	25 January 1999 (aged 26)	(Jamaica Football Federation) Mount Pleasant
20	FW	Renaldo Cephas	8 October 1999 (aged 25)	(Turkish Football Federation) Ankaragücü
21	FW	Warner Brown	19 August 2002 (aged 22)	(Jamaica Football Federation) Arnett Gardens
22	DF	Greg Leigh	30 September 1994 (aged 30)	(The Football Association) Oxford United
23	GK	Tafari Chambers	1 September 2000 (aged 24)	(Jamaica Football Federation) Mount Pleasant

=== Trinidad and Tobago ===
The following 24 players were named to the squad.

No.	Pos.	Player	Date of birth (age)	Club
1	GK	Marvin Phillip	1 August 1984 (aged 40)	(Trinidad and Tobago Football Association) Port of Spain
2	DF	Jelani Peters	17 December 1993 (aged 31)	Unattached
3	DF	Joevin Jones	3 August 1991 (aged 33)	(Trinidad and Tobago Football Association) Police FC
4	DF	Sheldon Bateau	29 January 1991 (aged 34)	(Royal Belgian Football Association) Beveren
5	DF	Jamal Jack	17 December 1987 (aged 37)	(Trinidad and Tobago Football Association) Club Sando
6	DF	Andre Raymond	9 November 2000 (aged 24)	(Scottish Football Association) Dunfermline Athletic
7	DF	Noah Powder	27 October 1998 (aged 26)	(United States Soccer Federation) Westchester
8	MF	Daniel Phillips	18 January 2001 (aged 24)	(The Football Association) Stevenage
9	MF	Duane Muckette	1 July 1995 (aged 29)	(Oman Football Association) Al-Khaburah
10	FW	Kevin Molino	17 June 1990 (aged 34)	(Trinidad and Tobago Football Association) Defence Force
11	FW	Isaiah Leacock	11 November 1999 (aged 25)	(Trinidad and Tobago Football Association) Defence Force
12	FW	Isaiah Lee	21 September 1999 (aged 25)	(Trinidad and Tobago Football Association) La Horquetta Rangers
13	FW	Reon Moore	22 September 1996 (aged 28)	Unattached
14	MF	John-Paul Rochford	5 January 2000 (aged 25)	(Trinidad and Tobago Football Association) Port of Spain
15	MF	Dantaye Gilbert	3 December 2004 (aged 20)	(Royal Dutch Football Association) PSV Eindhoven
16	DF	Alvin Jones	9 July 1994 (aged 30)	(National Autonomous Federation of Football of Honduras) Real Sociedad
17	DF	Justin Garcia	26 October 1995 (aged 29)	(Trinidad and Tobago Football Association) Defence Force
18	DF	Rio Cardines	7 January 2006 (aged 19)	(The Football Association) Crystal Palace
19	MF	Kristian Lee-Him	8 October 1993 (aged 31)	(Swedish Football Association) Syrianska
20	FW	Kaihim Thomas	8 February 2003 (aged 22)	(Trinidad and Tobago Football Association) Defence Force
21	GK	Jabari St. Hillaire	19 November 1999 (aged 25)	(Trinidad and Tobago Football Association) Defence Force
23	FW	Brent Sam	18 April 1996 (aged 29)	(Trinidad and Tobago Football Association) Defence Force
24	DF	Jesse Williams	18 May 2001 (aged 24)	Unattached
26	DF	Shervohnez Hamilton	16 November 2003 (aged 21)	(Trinidad and Tobago Football Association) Club Sando

== Broadcasting rights ==
Country/Region	Broadcaster	Ref.
United Kingdom	Premier Sports	
