= Jamaica national football team results (2020–present) =

This page details the match results and statistics of the Jamaica national football team from 2020 to present.

== Key ==
Key to matches

- Att.=Match attendance
- (H)=Home ground
- (A)=Away ground
- (N)=Neutral ground

== Results ==
Jamaica's score is shown first in each case.

Jamaica national football team results
Date	Venue	Opponents	Score	Competition	Jamaica scorers	Att.	Ref.
11 March 2020	Montego Bay Sports Complex, Montego Bay (H)	Bermuda	2–0	Friendly	Fletcher 42', Beckford 79'		
14 November 2020	Prince Faisal bin Fahd Stadium, Riyadh (A)	Saudi Arabia	0–3	Friendly			
17 November 2020	Prince Faisal bin Fahd Stadium, Riyadh (A)	Saudi Arabia	2–1	Friendly	Johnson 34', East 64'		
25 March 2021	Wiener Neustadt Arena, Wiener Neustadt (N)	United States	1–4	Friendly	Lowe 70'	0	
7 June 2021	Miki Athletic Stadium, Miki (N)	Serbia	1–1	Friendly	Gray 29'	0	
12 June 2021	Toyota Stadium, Nagoya (A)	Japan	0–4	Friendly			
12 July 2021	Exploria Stadium, Orlando (N)	Suriname	2–0	2021 CONCACAF Gold Cup	Nicholson 6', De Cordova-Reid 26'	6,403	
16 July 2021	Exploria Stadium, Orlando (N)	Guadeloupe	2–1	2021 CONCACAF Gold Cup	Burke 14', Flemmings 87'	6,527	
20 July 2021	Exploria Stadium, Orlando (N)	Costa Rica	0–1	2021 CONCACAF Gold Cup		10,264	
25 July 2021	AT&T Stadium, Arlington (N)	United States	0–1	2021 CONCACAF Gold Cup		41,318	
2 September 2021	Estadio Azteca, Mexico City (A)	Mexico	1–2	2022 FIFA World Cup qualification	Nicholson 65'	0	
5 September 2021	Independence Park, Kingston (H)	Panama	0–3	2022 FIFA World Cup qualification		0	
8 September 2021	Estadio Nacional, San José (A)	Costa Rica	1–1	2022 FIFA World Cup qualification	Nicholson 47'	3,000	
7 October 2021	Q2 Stadium, Austin (A)	United States	0–2	2022 FIFA World Cup qualification		20,500	
10 October 2021	Independence Park, Kingston (H)	Canada	0–0	2022 FIFA World Cup qualification		0	
13 October 2021	Estadio Olímpico Metropolitano, San Pedro Sula (A)	Honduras	2–0	2022 FIFA World Cup qualification	Roofe 38', Fisher 79'	18,000	
12 November 2021	Estadio Cuscatlán, San Salvador (A)	El Salvador	1–1	2022 FIFA World Cup qualification	Antonio 82'	10,000	
16 November 2021	Independence Park, Kingston (H)	United States	1–1	2022 FIFA World Cup qualification	Antonio 22'	4,100	
20 January 2022	National Stadium, Lima (A)	Peru	0–3	Friendly			
27 January 2022	Independence Park, Kingston (H)	Mexico	1–2	2022 FIFA World Cup qualification	Johnson 50'	0	
30 January 2022	Estadio Rommel Fernández, Panama City (A)	Panama	2–3	2022 FIFA World Cup qualification	Antonio 5' pen., Gray 87'	0	
2 February 2022	Independence Park, Kingston (H)	Costa Rica	0–1	2022 FIFA World Cup qualification		0	
24 March 2022	Independence Park, Kingston (H)	El Salvador	1–1	2022 FIFA World Cup qualification	Gray 72'		
27 March 2022	BMO Field, Toronto (A)	Canada	0–4	2022 FIFA World Cup qualification		29,122	
30 March 2022	Independence Park, Kingston (H)	Honduras	2–1	2022 FIFA World Cup qualification	Bailey 39' pen., Morrison 45+2'		
4 June 2022	Frank Essed Stadion, Paramaribo (A)	Suriname	1–1	2022–23 Nations League A	Flemmings 39'	3,032	
7 June 2022	Independence Park, Kingston (H)	Suriname	3–1	2022–23 Nations League A	Morrison 16', Flemmings 43', J. Lowe 70'		
14 June 2022	Independence Park, Kingston (H)	Mexico	1–1	2022–23 Nations League A	Bailey 4'		
23 August 2022	Ernst-Happel-Stadion, Vienna (N)	Morocco	0–3	Friendly			
26 August 2022	Wiener Neustadt Arena, Wiener Neustadt (N)	Qatar	1–1	Friendly	Fletcher 70'		
27 September 2022	Red Bull Arena, Harrison (N)	Argentina	0–3	Friendly			
9 November 2022	Olembe Stadium, Yaoundé (A)	Cameroon	1–1	Friendly	McMaster 60'		
11 March 2023	Montego Bay Sports Complex, Montego Bay (H)	Trinidad and Tobago	0–1	Friendly			
14 March 2023	Independence Park, Kingston (H)	Trinidad and Tobago	0–0	Friendly			
14 March 2023	Estadio Azteca, Mexico City (A)	Mexico	2–2	2022–23 Nations League A	De Cordova-Reid 8', Álvarez 33' (o.g.)		
15 June 2023	Wiener Neustadt Arena, Wiener Neustadt (N)	Qatar	1–2	Friendly	Nicholson 61' (pen.)		
19 June 2023	Wiener Neustadt Arena, Wiener Neustadt (N)	Jordan	1–2	Friendly	Burke 39' (pen.)		
24 June 2023	Soldier Field, Chicago (N)	United States	1–1	2023 Gold Cup	Lowe 13'	36,666	
28 June 2023	CityPark, St. Louis (N)	Trinidad and Tobago	4–1	2023 Gold Cup	Gray 14', 30', Bailey 18', Richards 90+2'	21,216	
2 July 2023	Levi's Stadium, Santa Clara (N)	Saint Kitts and Nevis	5–0	2023 Gold Cup	Archibald 30' (o.g.), Russell 45+2', Bernard 49', Johnson 72', Burke 74'	60,347	
9 July 2023	TQL Stadium, Cincinnati (N)	Guatemala	1–0	2023 Gold Cup	Bell 51'	24,979	
12 July 2023	Allegiant Stadium, Paradise (N)	Mexico	0–3	2023 Gold Cup		29,886	
8 September 2023	Independence Park, Kingston (H)	Honduras	1–0	2023–24 Nations League A	Gray 64'		
12 September 2023	Independence Park, Kingston (H)	Haiti	2–2	2023–24 Nations League A	Adé 51' (o.g.), De Cordova-Reid 83' (pen.)		
12 October 2023	Kirani James Athletic Stadium, St. George's (A)	Grenada	4–1	2023–24 Nations League A	Williams 12', Nicholson 22', Gray 74', De Cordova-Reid 87'		
15 October 2023	Hasely Crawford Stadium, Port of Spain (N)	Haiti	3–2	2023–24 Nations League A	Gray 18', Nicholson 57', Bailey 66'		
11 November 2023	Red Bull Arena, Harrison (N)	Guatemala	0–0	Friendly		20,000	
18 November 2023	Independence Park, Kingston (H)	Canada	1–2	2023–24 Nations League A	Nicholson 56'		
21 November 2023	BMO Field, Toronto (A)	Canada	3–2	2023–24 Nations League A	Nicholson 63', 66', De Cordova-Reid 78'	17,588	
1 March 2024	Hasely Crawford Stadium, Port of Spain (A)	Trinidad and Tobago	1–0	Friendly	Dixon 58'	0	
3 March 2024	Larry Gomes Stadium, Arima (A)	Trinidad and Tobago	0–0	Friendly			
21 March 2024	AT&T Stadium, Arlington (N)	United States	1–3 (a.e.t.)	2024 Nations League Finals	Leigh 1'	40,926	
24 March 2024	AT&T Stadium, Arlington (N)	Panama	1–0	2024 Nations League Finals	Lembikisa 41'		
6 June 2024	Independence Park, Kingston (H)	Dominican Republic	1–0	2026 FIFA World Cup qualification	Nicholson 16'	9,266	
9 June 2024	Windsor Park, Roseau (A)	Dominica	3–2	2026 FIFA World Cup qualification	Nicholson 30', 79', Dixon 42'	6,500	
22 June 2024	NRG Stadium, Houston (N)	Mexico	0–1	2024 Copa América		53,763	
26 June 2024	Allegiant Stadium, Paradise (N)	Ecuador	1–3	2024 Copa América	Antonio 54'	24,074	
30 June 2024	Q2 Stadium, Austin (N)	Venezuela	0–3	2024 Copa América		20,240	
6 September 2024	Independence Park, Kingston (H)	Cuba	0–0	2024–25 Nations League A		9,900	
10 September 2024	Estadio Nacional Chelato Uclés, Tegucigalpa (A)	Honduras	2–1	2024–25 Nations League A	Maldonado 49' o.g., Antonio 76' pen.		
10 October 2024	Nicaragua National Football Stadium, Managua (A)	Nicaragua	2–0	2024–25 Nations League A	Quijano 32' o.g., Williams 69'	16,630	
14 October 2024	Independence Park, Kingston (H)	Honduras	0–0	2024–25 Nations League A		11,263	
14 November 2024	Independence Park, Kingston (H)	United States	0–1	2024–25 Nations League A		20,513	
18 November 2024	Energizer Park, St. Louis (A)	United States	2–4	2024–25 Nations League A	D. Gray 53', 68'	21,080	
6 February 2025	Montego Bay Sports Complex, Montego Bay (H)	Trinidad and Tobago	1–0	Friendly	Sue-Lae McCalla 84'		
9 February 2025	Anthony Spaulding Sports Complex, Kingston (H)	Trinidad and Tobago	1–1	Friendly	Trimmingham 90+4' o.g.		
21 March 2025	Arnos Vale Stadium, Kingstown(A)	Saint Vincent and the Grenadines	1–1	2025 Gold Cup qualification	Bailey 90+8' pen.		
25 March 2025	Sabina Park, Kingston (H)	Saint Vincent and the Grenadines	3–0	2025 Gold Cup qualification	Brown 27', Johnson 89' o.g., Cephas 90+4'		
31 May 2025	Brentford Community Stadium, London (N)	Nigeria	2–2 (5–4 p)	Friendly	Dixon 12', Russell 63'	17,250	
7 June 2025	A. O. Shirley Recreation Ground, Road Town (A)	British Virgin Islands	1–0	2026 FIFA World Cup qualification	Brown 17'	1,060	
10 June 2025	Independence Park, Kingston (H)	Guatemala	3–0	2026 FIFA World Cup qualification	Russell 26', Brown 37', 73'	7,000	
16 June 2025	Dignity Health Sports Park, Carson (N)	Guatemala	0–1	2025 Gold Cup		18,262	
20 June 2025	PayPal Park, San Jose (N)	Guadeloupe	2–1	2025 Gold Cup	Bailey 41', Russell 45+4'	2,405	
24 June 2025	Q2 Stadium, Austin (N)	Panama	1–4	2025 Gold Cup	Bell 27'	3,283	
5 September 2025	Bermuda National Stadium, Hamilton (A)	Bermuda	4–0	2026 FIFA World Cup qualification	Lowe 6', Cephas 26', Palmer 58', Nicholson 90'	4,100	
10 September 2025	Independence Park, Kingston (H)	Trinidad and Tobago	2–0	2026 FIFA World Cup qualification	Cadamarteri 36', Russell 57'	25,016	
10 October 2025	Ergilio Hato Stadium, Willemstad (A)	Curaçao	0–2	2026 FIFA World Cup qualification		9,850	
14 October 2025	Independence Park, Kingston (H)	Bermuda	4–0	2026 FIFA World Cup qualification	Leverock 24' o.g., De Cordova-Reid 26', Nicholson 35', Richards 76'		
13 November 2025	Hasely Crawford Stadium, Port of Spain (A)	Trinidad and Tobago	1–1	2026 FIFA World Cup qualification	Molino 85'		
18 November 2025	Kingston, Jamaica (H)	Curaçao	0–0	2026 FIFA World Cup qualification			
