= 2025–26 Mount Pleasant F.A. season =

Mount Pleasant F.A.
2025–26 season
- Owner: Peter Gould
- Head coach: Theodore Whitmore
- Stadium: Drax Hall Sports Complex
- Jamaica Premier League: Matchday 1
- CONCACAF Caribbean Cup: Winner
- 2026 CONCACAF Champions Cup: TBD

The 2025–26 season is the 10th season in the history of Mount Pleasant and the club's 8th consecutive season in the top football league of Jamaica, Jamaica Premier League. In addition to the domestic league, the club is participating in this season edition of the CONCACAF Caribbean Cup. If the club wins the CONCACAF Caribbean Cup they will qualify for the 2026 CONCACAF Champions Cup Round of 16 or finishes 2nd or 3rd will qualify to Round One.

== Transfers ==
=== In ===
Pos.	Player	Transferred from	Fee	Date	Source
Summer transfers
MF	(Jamaica) Warner Brown	(Jamaica) Arnett Gardens	Undisclosed	6 July 2025	
MF	(Jamaica) Tyreek Magee	Unattached	Free Transfer	5 October 2025	

=== Out ===
Pos.	Player	Transferred to	Fee	Date	Source
Summer transfers
DF	(Jamaica) Sue-Lae McCalla	(Jamaica) R.A.E.C. Mons (2015)	Undisclosed	19 September 2025	
MF	(Jamaica) Devonte Campbell	(Jamaica) R.A.E.C. Mons (2015)	Undisclosed	19 September 2025	
	(Jamaica) Romaine Blake	(Jamaica) R.A.E.C. Mons (2015)	Undisclosed	19 September 2025	

== Competitions ==
=== Overall record ===
Competition	First match	Last match	Starting round	Final position	Record							
Competition	First match	Last match	Starting round	Final position	Pld	W	D	L	GF	GA	GD	Win %
Jamaica Premier League	24 August 2025	TBD	Matchday 1	TBD	13	6	6	1	23	8	+15	46.15
CONCACAF Caribbean Cup	19 August 2025	2 December 2025	Group Stage	Winner	8	6	1	1	15	4	+11	75.00
2026 CONCACAF Champions Cup	March 2026	TBD	Round of 16	TBD	0	0	0	0	0	0	+0	—
Total					21	12	7	2	38	12	+26	57.14

Source: Jamaica Premier League, Soccerway

=== Jamaica Premier League ===
==== Results summary ====
Overall								Home						Away					
Pld	W	D	L	GF	GA	GD	Pts	W	D	L	GF	GA	GD	W	D	L	GF	GA	GD
13	6	6	1	23	8	+15	24	4	3	0	19	6	+13	2	3	1	4	2	+2

Last updated: 11 October 2025.
Source: Jamaica Premier League

==== Results by round ====
Round	1	2	4	7	8	10	11	12	3	13	14	15	16	14	15	16	17	18	19	20	21	22	23	24	25	26	27	28	29	30	31	32	33	34	35	36
Ground	H	H	H	A	H	A	H	A	A	H	A	A	H																							
Result	D	D	W	D	W	D	W	W	L	W	W	D	D																							
Position	6	9	8	11	7	10	6	4	4	4	4	4	4																							
Points	1	2	5	6	9	10	13	16	16	19	22	23	24																							

Source: Jamaica Premier League
A = Away; H = Home; W = Win; D = Draw; L = Loss; P = Postponed

Notes:

- Matchdays 3, 5, 6, and 9 were postponed due to Mount Pleasant's involvement in the CONCACAF Caribbean Cup.

==== Matches ====
24 August 2025 1	Mount Pleasant F.A.	2-2	Montego Bay United	Saint Ann's Bay, Saint Ann
15:00 Jamaica Time UTC−05:00	Shaqueil Bradford 18'; Owen Jumpp 83'	Report	Jahmari Clarke 49'; Dwight Merrick 51'	Stadium: Drax Hall Sports Complex

1 September 2025 2	Mount Pleasant F.A.	1-1	Molynes United	Montego Bay, St. James
17:00 Jamaica Time UTC−05:00	Shaqueil Bradford 53'	Report	Marlon Pennicooke 58'	Stadium: Catherine Hall Sports Complex

7 September 2025 3	Racing United	v	Mount Pleasant F.A.	Kingston
15:30 Jamaica Time UTC−05:00		Report		Stadium: Stadium East Field

14 September 2025 4	Mount Pleasant F.A.	2-1	Cavalier	Saint Ann's Bay, Saint Ann
15:30 Jamaica Time UTC−05:00	Daniel Green 79'; Raheem Edwards 90'	Report	Christopher Ainsworth 33'	Stadium: Drax Hall Sports Complex; Attendance: 3,000

21 September 2025 5	Harbour View	v	Mount Pleasant F.A.	Kingston
15:30 Jamaica Time UTC−05:00		Report		Stadium: Harbour View Mini Stadium

28 September 2025 6	Mount Pleasant F.A.	v	Arnett Gardens	Saint Ann's Bay, Saint Ann
15:00 Jamaica Time UTC−05:00		Report		Stadium: Drax Hall Sports Complex

5 October 2025 7	Waterhouse	1-1	Mount Pleasant F.A.	Kingston
17:30 Jamaica Time UTC−05:00	Jamoi Topey 20'	Report	Kenly Deacon 35'	Stadium: Drewsland Mini Stadium

12 October 2025 8	Mount Pleasant F.A.	3-1	Chapelton Maroons	Saint Ann's Bay, Saint Ann
15:00 Jamaica Time UTC−05:00	Claver Nugent 31'; Raheem Edwards 36'; Demario Phillips 90'	Report	Zhaine Pinnock 10'	Stadium: Drax Hall Sports Complex

19 October 2025 9	Mount Pleasant F.A.	v	Treasure Beach F.C.	Saint Ann's Bay, Saint Ann
15:00 Jamaica Time UTC−05:00		Report		Stadium: Drax Hall Sports Complex

7 December 2025 10	Dunbeholden	0-0	Mount Pleasant F.A.	Portmore, Saint Catherine
15:00 Jamaica Time UTC−05:00		Report		Stadium: Dunbeholden Sports Complex

11 December 2025 11	Mount Pleasant F.A.	5-0	Tivoli Gardens	Saint Ann's Bay, Saint Ann
15:00 Jamaica Time UTC−05:00	Daniel Green 12', 56'; Warner Brown 28' (pen.), 75'; Raphael Intervil 67'	Report		Stadium: Drax Hall Sports Complex

14 December 2025 12	Portmore United	0-2	Mount Pleasant F.A.	Portmore, Saint Catherine
15:00 Jamaica Time UTC−05:00		Report	Warner Brown 33', 45+1'	Stadium: Ferdi Neita Sports Complex

17 December 2025 3	Racing United	1-0	Mount Pleasant F.A.	Kingston
15:00 Jamaica Time UTC−05:00	D. Herrera 90+4'	Report		Stadium: Stadium East Field

21 December 2025 13	Mount Pleasant F.A.	5-0	Spanish Town Police FC	Saint Ann's Bay, Saint Ann
15:00 Jamaica Time UTC−05:00		Report	Raheem Edwards 3', 61'; Tajay Mcintosh 54', 90'; Jahshaun Anglin 79'	Stadium: Drax Hall Sports Complex

28 December 2025 14	Montego Bay United	0-1	Mount Pleasant F.A.	Montego Bay, St. James
15:00 Jamaica Time UTC−05:00		Report	Raheem Edwards 25'	Stadium: Jarrett Park

4 January 2026 15	Molynes United	0-0	Mount Pleasant F.A.	Kingston
17:30 Jamaica Time UTC−05:00		Report		Stadium: Waterhouse Stadium

11 January 2026 16	Mount Pleasant F.A.	1-1	Racing United	Saint Ann's Bay, Saint Ann
15:00 Jamaica Time UTC−05:00	Johnson Jeudy 55'	Report	Tajay Ajani Grant 69'	Stadium: Drax Hall Sports Complex

17	v

18	v

19	v

20	v

21	v

22	v

23	v

24	v

25	v

26	v

27	v

28	v

29	v

30	v

31	v

32	v

33	v

34	v

35	v

36	v

37	v

38	v

39	v

=== CONCACAF Caribbean Cup ===
==== Group Stage ====
Pos	Team	Pld	W	D	L	GF	GA	GD	Pts	Qualification
1	(Jamaica) Mount Pleasant	4	4	0	0	7	0	+7	12	Advance to semi-finals
2	(Dominican Republic) O&M	4	2	0	2	6	5	+1	6	Advance to semi-finals
3	(Suriname) Robinhood	4	1	1	2	5	6	−1	4	
4	(Trinidad and Tobago) Central	4	1	1	2	4	6	−2	4	
5	(Dominican Republic) Moca	4	1	0	3	2	7	−5	3	

Source: CONCACAF

==== Results by round ====
Round	1	2	3	4
Ground	H	A	A	H
Result	W	W	W	W
Position	2	1	1	1
Points	3	6	9	12

Source: Concacaf Matches Concacaf Standings
A = Away; H = Home; W = Win; D = Draw; L = Loss; P = Postponed

15 August 2025 1	Mount Pleasant F.A.	1-0	Robinhood	Kingston, Jamaica
19:00 Jamaica Time UTC−05:00	Warner Brown (red card) 10'; Sue-Lae McCalla 35'	Report	Dimitrio Andro (yellow card) 64'	Stadium: National Stadium; Referee: Shavin Greene

27 August 2025 2	Moca	0-2	Mount Pleasant F.A.	Dominican Republic
20:00 UTC−04:00	Richard Dabas (yellow card) 48'; Juan Ovalles (yellow card) 55'; Valentin Sabella (red card) 61'; Yohan Francisco (yellow card) 62'; Juan Angeles (yellow card) 90+2'; Jose Goez (yellow card) 90+8'	Report	Kyle Ming (yellow card) 14'; Daniel Green 31' 60'; Kimoni Bailey (yellow card) 90+1'; Chevaughn Walsh (yellow card) 90+5'	Stadium: Estadio Complejo Deportivo Moca 86; Referee: Edson Lieveld

23 September 2025 3	Central	0-2	Mount Pleasant F.A.	Port of Spain, Trinidad and Tobago
20:00 UTC−04:00	Ross Russell (yellow card) 39'	Report	Alex Marshall (yellow card) 39'; Tevin Shaw (yellow card) 40'; Raheem Edwards 51'; Owen Jumpp (yellow card) 88'; Chevaughn Walsh 90'	Stadium: Hasely Crawford Stadium; Referee: Sergio Rozenhaut

30 September 2025 4	Mount Pleasant F.A.	2-0	O&M	Kingston, Jamaica
19:00 Jamaica Time UTC−05:00	Gadail Irving 36'; Ranaldo Biggs (yellow card) 47' (goal) 63'; Kyle Ming (yellow card) 66'	Report	Reyvin de la Rosa (yellow card) 28'; Isaac Báez (yellow card) 90+4'	Stadium: National Stadium; Referee: Ken Pennyfeather

==== Semi-Finals ====
22 October 2025 Semi-final first leg	Defence Force	1-5	Mount Pleasant F.A.	Port of Spain, Trinidad & Tobago
17:00 (18:00 UTC−4)	C.Gonzales (yellow card) 18'; T.Bailey (yellow card) 22'; S.Bertrand (yellow card) 50'; S.Bateau (yellow card) 67'; J.Sadoo (yellow card) 82'; Kaihim Thomas 90+7'	Report	Warner Brown 5'; Raheem Edwards 15' 57'; Chevaughn Walsh (yellow card) 78'; Shaqueil Bradford 85'; Kimoni Bailey 90+3'	Stadium: Hasely Crawford Stadium; Referee: Adonis Carrasco Garcia

5 November 2025 Semi-final second leg	Mount Pleasant F.A.	0-1 (5-2 agg.)	Defence Force	Kingston, Jamaica
18:00 (19:00 UTC−5)	Fitzroy Cummings (yellow card) 19'; Demario Phillips (yellow card) 67'		Kevin Molino 13'	Stadium: National Stadium; Referee: Ken Pennyfeather

Note: The second leg was originally scheduled for October 29, 2025 however due to Tropical Storm Melissa CONCACAF decided to push back the fixture to November 5, 2025 at 6:00pm local time.

==== Final ====
25 November 2025 Final first leg	O&M	0-1	Mount Pleasant F.A.	Santiago de los Caballeros
19:00 Jamaica Time UTC−05:00	S. Cuello (yellow card) 78'; H. Ramierez (yellow card) 90+8'	Report	Kimoni Bailey 8'; Clifford Thomas (yellow card) 39'; Demario Phillips (yellow card) 90+6'	Stadium: Estadio Cibao FC; Referee: Ricangel de Leça

2 December 2025 Final second leg	Mount Pleasant F.A.	2-2 (3-2 agg.)	O&M	Kingston, Jamaica
19:00 Jamaica Time UTC−05:00	Warner Brown 62'; Tyreek Magee 87' (yellow card) 89'; Jahshaun Anglin (yellow card) 90+2'	Report	Júnior Capellán (red card) 27'; Herard Frantzety 45+5'; Julen Olasagasti 69'; A. Gomez (yellow card) 84'	Stadium: National Stadium; Referee: Jose Raúl Torres Rivera

=== CONCACAF Champions Cup ===
Mount Pleasant F.A. qualified for the tournament in the Round of 16 as the winner of 2025 CONCACAF Caribbean Cup.

==== Round of 16 ====
March 11 First leg	LA Galaxy (United States)	3–0	(Jamaica) Mount Pleasant F.A.	Carson
21:30 UTC−05:00	Pec 6', 89', 90+6'; Nelson (yellow card) 26'; Klauss (yellow card) 53'; Wynder (yellow card) 90+4'		Phillips (yellow card) 36'; Chambers (yellow card) 64'	Stadium: Dignity Health Sports Park; Attendance: 4,287; Referee: Reon Radix (Grenada)

March 19 Second leg	Mount Pleasant F.A. (Jamaica)	0–3 (0–6 agg.)	(United States) LA Galaxy	Kingston, Jamaica
19:00 Jamaica Time UTC−05:00		Report	Klauss 18'; Pec 61', 87'	Stadium: National Stadium; Referee: Kwinsi Williams (Trinidad & Tobago)

=== Appearances and goals ===
No.	Pos	Nat	Player	Total		Jamaica Premier League		CONCACAF Caribbean Cup	
No.	Pos	Nat	Player	Apps	Goals	Apps	Goals	Apps	Goals
Goalkeepers
1	GK	(Jamaica) JAM	Tafari Hiziya Chambers	19	0	11	0	8	0
34	GK	(Jamaica) JAM	Kemar Foster	2	0	2	0	0	0
96	GK	(Jamaica) JAM	Shaquan Davis	0	0	0	0	0	0
Defenders
2	DF	(Jamaica) JAM	Gadail Irving	14	1	5+2	0	6+1	1
33	DF	(Jamaica) JAM	Shaquille Dyer	9	0	6+2	0	1	0
4	DF	(Jamaica) JAM	Fitzroy Cummings	14	0	8	0	5+1	0
5	DF	(Jamaica) JAM	Earl Dennis	1	0	0+1	0	0	0
15	DF	(Jamaica) JAM	Kyle Ming	19	0	13	0	6	0
16	DF	(Saint Lucia) LCA	Melvin Doxilly	1	0	1	0	0	0
31	DF	(Jamaica) JAM	Demario Phillips	17	1	9+2	1	6	0
42	DF	(Jamaica) JAM	Jamoi Topey	9	1	2	1	6+1	0
Midfielders
5	MF	(Jamaica) JAM	Jaheem Douglas	2	0	1	0	0+1	0
6	MF	(Haiti) HAI	Daniel Saint-Fleur	4	0	1+1	0	1+1	0
10	MF	(Haiti) HAI	Johnson Jeudy	10	1	3+3	1	2+2	0
11	MF	(Jamaica) JAM	Alex Marshall	13	0	5+3	0	2+3	0
12	MF	(Jamaica) JAM	Kimoni Bailey	17	2	9+1	0	3+4	2
17	MF	(Jamaica) JAM	Jahshaun Anglin	18	1	9+1	1	8	0
18	MF	(Jamaica) JAM	Tevin Shaw	11	0	3+4	0	2+2	0
20	MF	(Haiti) HAI	Raphael Intervil	9	1	7+1	1	0+1	0
21	MF	(Jamaica) JAM	Owen Jumpp	5	1	1+3	1	0+1	0
23	MF	(Jamaica) JAM	Lamar Walker	6	0	0+3	0	2+1	0
29	MF	(Jamaica) JAM	Tyreek Magee	6	1	3+1	0	0+2	1
72	MF	(Haiti) HAI	Clifford Thomas	13	0	10	0	2+1	0
Forwards
8	FW	(Jamaica) JAM	Chevaughn Walsh	7	1	2+2	0	0+3	1
9	FW	(Jamaica) JAM	Daniel Green	20	5	9+3	3	7+1	2
19	FW	(Jamaica) JAM	Warner Brown	14	5	9+1	4	1+3	1
25	FW	(Jamaica) JAM	Raheem Edwards	19	8	6+5	5	6+2	3
28	FW	(Jamaica) JAM	Claver Nugent	5	1	2+1	1	0+2	0
27	FW	(Jamaica) JAM	Ranaldo Biggs	5	1	0+2	0	3	1
38	FW	(Jamaica) JAM	Shaqueil Bradford	18	3	5+5	2	1+7	1
77	FW	(Haiti) HAI	Angelo Exilus	7	0	0+6	0	0+1	0
49	FW	(Jamaica) JAM	Tajay McIntosh	4	2	0+4	2	0	0
Players who transferred out during the season
14	DF	(Jamaica) JAM	Sue-Lae Mccalla	3	1	1	0	2	1
7	MF	(Jamaica) JAM	Devonte Campbell	1	0	0	0	1	0

- Source: Jamaica Premier League Concacaf

=== Assists ===
The list is sorted by squad number when season-total assists are equal. Players with no assists are not included in the list.

As of December 28, 2025

2025–26 season
Rk.	No.	Pos.	Player	Jamaica Premier League	CONCACAF Caribbean Cup	Season total
1	19	FW	(Jamaica) Warner Brown	2	1	3
1	2	DF	(Jamaica) Gadail Irving	0	3	3
1	20	MF	(Haiti) Raphael Intervil	1	2	3
1	9	FW	(Jamaica) Daniel Green	2	1	3
2	21	MF	(Jamaica) Owen Jumpp	2	0	2
2	25	FW	(Jamaica) Raheem Edwards	1	1	2
3	11	MF	(Jamaica) Alex Marshall	1	0	1
3	12	MF	(Jamaica) Kimoni Bailey	1	0	1
3	42	DF	(Jamaica) Jamoi Topey	0	1	1
3	8	FW	(Jamaica) Chevaughn Walsh	0	1	1
3	72	MF	(Haiti) Clifford Thomas	0	1	1
3	31	DF	(Jamaica) Demario Phillips	1	0	1
Total				11	11	22

CONCACAF, Jamaica Premier League

=== Disciplinary record ===
The list is sorted by red cards, then yellow cards (and by squad number when total cards are equal). Players with no cards not included in the list.

As of 11 January 2026

Rk.	No.	Pos.	Player	Jamaica Premier League			CONCACAF Caribbean Cup			Total			
Rk.	No.	Pos.	Player	Yellow card	Second yellow card	Red card	Yellow card	Second yellow card	Red card	Yellow card	Second yellow card	Red card	
1	31	DF	(Jamaica) Demario Phillips	2	0	0	2	0	0	4	0	0	
2	15	DF	(Jamaica) Kyle Ming	2	0	0	1	0	0	3	0	0	
3	42	DF	(Jamaica) Jamoi Topey	2	0	0	0	0	0	2	0	0	
3	8	FW	(Jamaica) Chevaughn Walsh	0	0	0	2	0	0	2	0	0	
3	12	MF	(Jamaica) Kimoni Bailey	1	0	0	1	0	0	2	0	0	
3	19	FW	(Jamaica) Warner Brown	2	0	0	0	0	1	2	0	1	
3	72	MF	(Haiti) Clifford Thomas	1	0	0	1	0	0	2	0	0	
4	18	MF	(Jamaica) Tevin Andrae Shaw	1	0	0	0	0	0	1	0	0	
4	27	FW	(Jamaica) Ranaldo Biggs	0	0	0	1	0	0	1	0	0	
4	1	GK	(Jamaica) Tafari Hiziya Chambers	1	0	0	0	0	0	1	0	0	
4	4	DF	(Jamaica) Fitzroy Cummings	0	0	0	1	0	0	1	0	0	
4	29	MF	(Jamaica) Tyreek Magee	0	0	0	1	0	0	1	0	0	
4	17	MF	(Jamaica) Jahshaun Anglin	0	0	0	1	0	0	1	0	0	
4	2	DF	(Jamaica) Gadail Irving	1	0	0	0	0	0	1	0	0	
4	Total				13	0	0	11	0	1	24	0	1

Jamaica Premier League CONCACAF

=== Clean sheets ===
The list is sorted by squad number when season-total clean sheets are equal. Goalkeepers with no appearances not included in the list.

As of January 11, 2026

Jamaica Premier League CONCACAF

2025–26 season
Rk.	No.	Goalkeeper	Jamaica Premier League	CONCACAF Caribbean Cup	Season total	Season percentage
1	1	(Jamaica) Tafari Chambers	6	5	11	58% (11/19)
2	34	(Jamaica) Kemar Foster	0	0	0	0% (0/2)
Total			6	5	11	52% (11/21)
