= 2026 FIFA World Cup Group L =

FIFA World Cup group

Group L of the 2026 FIFA World Cup took place from June 17 to 27, 2026. The group consisted of England, Croatia, Ghana, and Panama.

England finished as group leaders, with Croatia finishing as runners-up after crucial victories against Panama and Ghana in their subsequent two group games. Thus, both teams advanced to the round of 32.

Ghana finished in third place, and were able to advance as one of the top eight third-place teams. Panama lost all three group games without scoring a goal, thus making them the first national team to not score in a World Cup since Algeria and Honduras in 2010.

Additionally, it was England’s first World Cup ever played on U.S. soil after missing out the 1994 edition.

== Teams ==
Draw position	Team	Pot	Confederation	Method of qualification	Date of qualification	Finals appearance	Last appearance	Previous best performance	FIFA Rankings	
Draw position	Team	Pot	Confederation	Method of qualification	Date of qualification	Finals appearance	Last appearance	Previous best performance	November 2025 (Note: The rankings of November 2025 were used for seeding for the final draw.)	June 2026
L1	England	1	UEFA	UEFA Group K winner	October 14, 2025	17th	2022	Winner (1966)	4	4
L2	Croatia	2	UEFA	UEFA Group L winner	November 14, 2025	7th	2022	Runner-up (2018)	10	11
L3	Ghana	4	CAF	CAF Group I winner	October 12, 2025	5th	2022	Quarterfinals (2010)	72	73
L4	Panama	3	CONCACAF	CONCACAF Group A winner	November 18, 2025	2nd	2018	Group stage (2018)	30	34

== Standings ==
Pos	Team	Pld	W	D	L	GF	GA	GD	Pts	Qualification
1	England	3	2	1	0	6	2	+4	7	Advance to knockout stage
2	Croatia	3	2	0	1	5	5	0	6	Advance to knockout stage
3	Ghana	3	1	1	1	2	2	0	4	Advance to knockout stage
4	Panama	3	0	0	3	0	4	−4	0	

Source: FIFA
Rules for classification: Group stage tiebreakers

In the round of 32:

- The winner of Group L, England, advanced to play the third-place team of Group K, DR Congo.
- The runner-up of Group L, Croatia, advanced to play the runner-up of Group K, Portugal.
- The third-place team of Group L, Ghana, advanced to play the winner of Group K, Colombia, as one of the eight best third-place teams from the group stage.

== Matches ==
All times listed are local.

=== England vs Croatia ===
The teams had previously met in eleven previous matches, including a 2–1 semi-final win in 2018 for Croatia to advance to their first final. Their most recent meeting was in the UEFA Euro 2020 group stage, with England winning 1–0.

In the 12th minute, England were awarded a penalty after Luka Modric fouled Noni Madueke with a kick inside the penalty area. Harry Kane took the penalty which was saved down low to his left by Croatian goalkeeper Dominik Livaković. The penalty had to be re-taken as Livaković was judged to have moved off his line before it was kicked, Kane again took the penalty and scored into the right of the net to put England into a 1–0 lead. In the 36th minute Martin Baturina made it 1–1 with a right foot shot to the top left corner of the net from outside the penalty area on the right which England goalkeeper Jordan Pickford got a hand to but couldn't prevent from going into the net. In the 42nd minute, England went back in front when Kane headed to the left of the net after making a run to meet a corner from the right by Declan Rice. With his second goal, Kane equalled Gary Lineker’s goals record for England at the World Cup with 10 goals. Five minutes later it was 2–2 when Petar Musa fired to the net from the left inside the penalty area after a header back to him from Ivan Perišić.

England went back in front, two minutes into the second half when Jude Bellingham received the ball on the right before cutting in and shooting right footed low to the left corner of the net from the right of the penalty area. It was 4–2 in the 85th minute when substitute Marcus Rashford received the ball on the left of the penalty area before cutting in on his right foot and shooting low to the right corner of the net.

June 17, 2026
3:00 p.m. UTC−5

England	4–2	Croatia
Kane 12' (pen.), 42'; Bellingham 47'; Rashford 85'	(Note: "England vs Croatia | First Stage | FIFA World Cup 2026". FIFA. Retrieved June 17, 2026.; "Match Report – Group L – England v. Croatia". FIFA. June 17, 2026. Retrieved June 17, 2026.; "Post match summary report – Group L – England v. Croatia". FIFA. June 17, 2026. Retrieved June 19, 2026.)	Baturina 36'; Musa 45+5'

AT&T Stadium, Arlington
Attendance: 70,389
Referee: Clément Turpin (France)

England	Croatia

GK	1	Jordan Pickford
RB	24	Reece James
CB	2	Ezri Konsa
CB	5	John Stones	(substituted off) 87'
LB	3	Nico O'Reilly
CM	8	Elliot Anderson
CM	4	Declan Rice	(substituted off) 72'
RW	20	Noni Madueke	(substituted off) 72'
AM	10	Jude Bellingham	(substituted off) 80'
LW	18	Anthony Gordon	(substituted off) 72'
CF	9	Harry Kane (c)
Substitutions:
MF	17	Morgan Rogers	(substituted on) 72'
FW	7	Bukayo Saka	(substituted on) 72'
FW	11	Marcus Rashford	(substituted on) 72'
DF	25	Djed Spence	(substituted on) 80'
DF	6	Marc Guéhi	(substituted on) 87'
Manager:
(Germany) Thomas Tuchel

GK	1	Dominik Livaković
CB	6	Josip Šutalo
CB	22	Luka Vušković	(substituted off) 66'
CB	4	Joško Gvardiol
RM	2	Josip Stanišić
CM	10	Luka Modrić (c)	(substituted off) 58'
CM	15	Mario Pašalić	(substituted off) 78'
LM	14	Ivan Perišić
RF	17	Petar Sučić
CF	26	Petar Musa	(substituted off) 66'
LF	16	Martin Baturina	(substituted off) 78'
Substitutions:
MF	8	Mateo Kovačić	(substituted on) 58'
FW	24	Marco Pašalić	(substituted on) 66'
FW	20	Igor Matanović	(substituted on) 66'
FW	9	Andrej Kramarić	(substituted on) 78'
MF	13	Nikola Vlašić	(substituted on) 78'
Manager:
Zlatko Dalić

Man of the Match:
Harry Kane (England)

Assistant referees:
Nicolas Danos (France)
Benjamin Pagès (France)
Fourth official:
Katia Itzel García (Mexico)
Reserve assistant referee:
Sandra Ramírez (Mexico)
Video assistant referee:
Jérôme Brisard (France)
Assistant video assistant referee:
Willy Delajod (France)
Support video assistant referee:
Fedayi San (Switzerland)

=== Ghana vs Panama ===
The two teams had never met before.

In the 95th minute, Caleb Yirenkyi got the winning goal with a close range finish after a low cross by Brandon Thomas-Asante from the left, securing a 1–0 win and becoming the second-youngest player to score for Ghana at a World Cup behind Haminu Draman. The 95th minute strike was also Ghana's latest ever goal scored in regulation time at a World Cup.

June 17, 2026
7:00 p.m. UTC−4

Ghana	1–0	Panama
Yirenkyi 90+5'	(Note: "Ghana vs Panama | First Stage | FIFA World Cup 2026". FIFA. Retrieved June 18, 2026.; "Match Report – Group L – Ghana v. Panama". FIFA. June 18, 2026. Retrieved June 18, 2026.; "Post match summary report – Group L – Ghana v. Panama". FIFA. June 18, 2026. Retrieved June 19, 2026.)

BMO Field, Toronto
Attendance: 42,942
Referee: Glenn Nyberg (Sweden)

Ghana	Panama

GK	1	Lawrence Ati-Zigi		(substituted off) 46'
RB	26	Marvin Senaya
CB	4	Jonas Adjetey
CB	18	Jerome Opoku
LB	14	Gideon Mensah
DM	15	Elisha Owusu		(substituted off) 78'
CM	3	Caleb Yirenkyi	(yellow card) 16'
CM	22	Kamaldeen Sulemana		(substituted off) 58'
RF	24	Ernest Nuamah		(substituted off) 58'
CF	9	Jordan Ayew (c)		(substituted off) 87'
LF	11	Antoine Semenyo
Substitutions:
GK	16	Benjamin Asare		(substituted on) 46'
MF	7	Abdul Fatawu		(substituted on) 58'
FW	10	Brandon Thomas-Asante		(substituted on) 58'
MF	8	Kwasi Sibo		(substituted on) 78'
FW	25	Prince Kwabena Adu		(substituted on) 87'
Manager:
(Portugal) Carlos Queiroz

GK	22	Orlando Mosquera
CB	13	Jiovany Ramos
CB	3	José Córdoba
CB	16	Andrés Andrade
RM	23	Michael Amir Murillo
CM	14	Carlos Harvey	(yellow card) 90+9'
CM	11	Yoel Bárcenas (c)
LM	2	César Blackman	(yellow card) 72'	(substituted off) 90'
RF	6	Cristian Martínez		(substituted off) 63'
CF	18	Cecilio Waterman		(substituted off) 63'
LF	7	José Luis Rodríguez		(substituted off) 74'
Substitutions:
FW	17	José Fajardo		(substituted on) 63'
FW	24	Azarias Londoño		(substituted on) 63'
MF	10	Ismael Díaz		(substituted on) 74'
MF	20	Aníbal Godoy		(substituted on) 90'
Manager:
(Spain) Thomas Christiansen

Man of the Match:
Antoine Semenyo (Ghana)

Assistant referees:
Mahbod Beigi (Sweden)
Andreas Söderkvist (Sweden)
Fourth official:
Khalid Al-Turais (Saudi Arabia)
Reserve assistant referee:
Mohammed Al-Bakry (Saudi Arabia)
Video assistant referee:
Bram Van Driessche (Belgium)
Assistant video assistant referee:
Marco Di Bello (Italy)
Support video assistant referee:
Bastian Dankert (Germany)

=== England vs Ghana ===
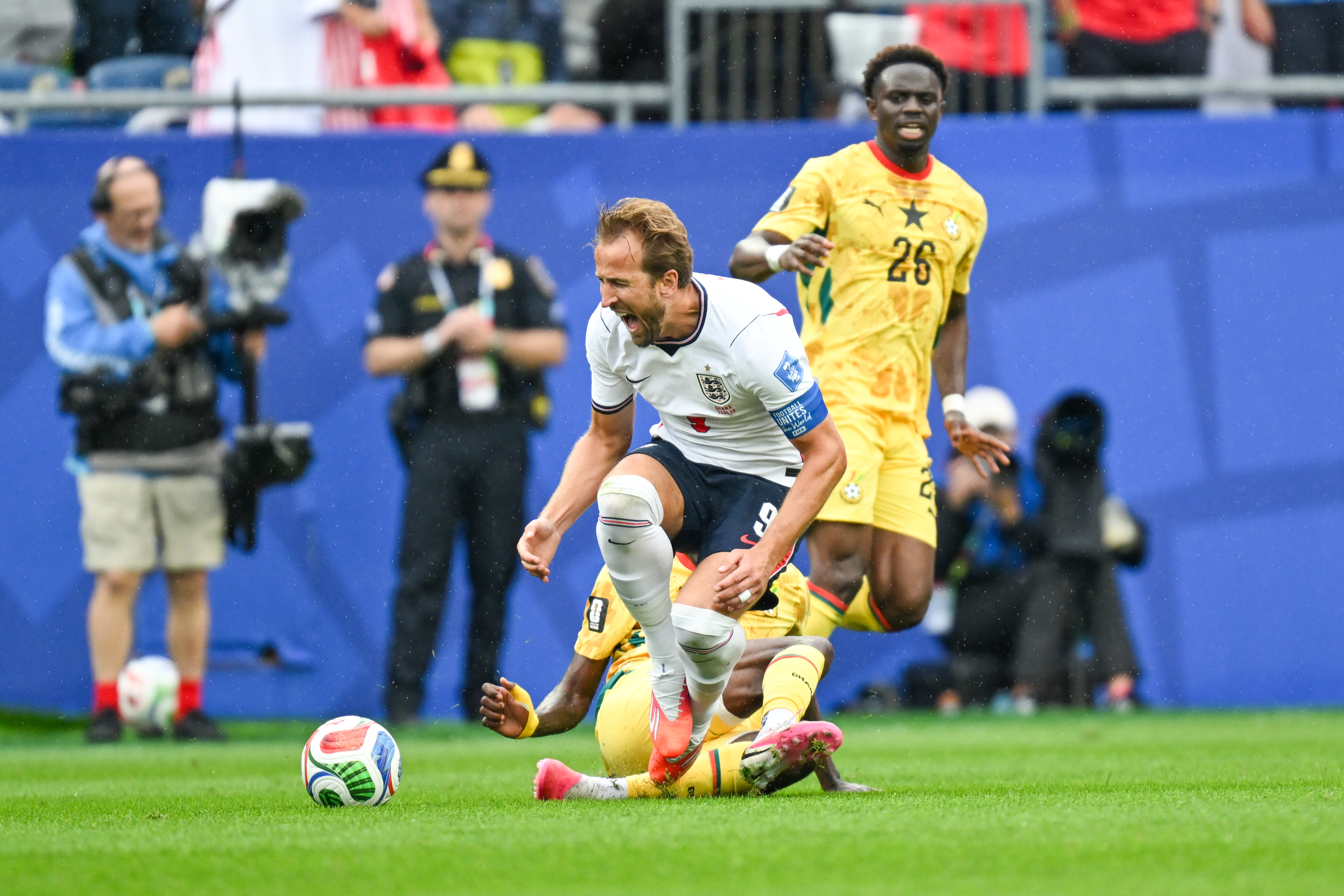
During the match between England and Ghana

England had previously faced Ghana only once, a 1–1 friendly draw in 2011.

In a game of few chances, in the 66th minute Jordan Pickford collided with Prince Kwabena Adu outside the penalty area with a free awarded to Pickford.

In the 78th minute Ghana had a potential penalty not awarded, Ezri Konsa dived in to challenge Prince Kwabena Adu in the penalty area, bringing him down without making any contact with the ball. Bukayo Saka had a low shot from the right saved by Ghana goalkeeper Benjamin Asare. Nico O'Reilly also headed against the bar from six yards out after a cross from Marcus Rashford from the right with Harry Kane shooting the rebound over the bar, with the match finishing 0–0.

June 23, 2026
4:00 p.m. UTC−4

England	0–0	Ghana
	(Note: "England vs Ghana | First Stage | FIFA World Cup 2026". FIFA. Retrieved June 23, 2026.; "Match Report – Group L – England v. Ghana". FIFA. June 23, 2026. Retrieved June 23, 2026.; "Post match summary report – Group L – England v. Ghana". FIFA. June 24, 2026. Retrieved June 25, 2026.)

Gillette Stadium, Foxborough
Attendance: 63,983
Referee: Saíd Martínez (Honduras)

England	Ghana

GK	1	Jordan Pickford
RB	24	Reece James
CB	2	Ezri Konsa
CB	6	Marc Guéhi
LB	25	Djed Spence		(substituted off) 65'
CM	8	Elliot Anderson		(substituted off) 74'
CM	4	Declan Rice	(yellow card) 41'
RW	20	Noni Madueke		(substituted off) 83'
AM	10	Jude Bellingham		(substituted off) 74'
LW	18	Anthony Gordon		(substituted off) 65'
CF	9	Harry Kane (c)
Substitutions:
FW	7	Bukayo Saka		(substituted on) 65'
DF	3	Nico O'Reilly		(substituted on) 65'
MF	21	Eberechi Eze		(substituted on) 74'
MF	17	Morgan Rogers		(substituted on) 74'
FW	11	Marcus Rashford		(substituted on) 83'
Manager:
(Germany) Thomas Tuchel

GK	16	Benjamin Asare
RB	26	Marvin Senaya		(substituted off) 87'
CB	4	Jonas Adjetey
CB	18	Jerome Opoku
LB	14	Gideon Mensah
RM	19	Iñaki Williams	(yellow card) 60'	(substituted off) 66'
CM	3	Caleb Yirenkyi
CM	5	Thomas Partey
LM	8	Kwasi Sibo
CF	9	Jordan Ayew (c)		(substituted off) 66'
CF	11	Antoine Semenyo
Substitutions:
MF	7	Abdul Fatawu		(substituted on) 66'
FW	25	Prince Kwabena Adu		(substituted on) 66'	(substituted off) 90+5'
DF	21	Kojo Peprah Oppong		(substituted on) 87'
DF	17	Abdul Rahman Baba		(substituted on) 90+5'
Manager:
(Portugal) Carlos Queiroz

Man of the Match:
Jude Bellingham (England)

Assistant referees:
Walter López (Honduras)
Christian Ramírez (Honduras)
Fourth official:
Ma Ning (China)
Reserve assistant referee:
Zhou Fei (China)
Video assistant referee:
Armando Villarreal (United States)
Assistant video assistant referee:
Erick Miranda (Mexico)
Support video assistant referee:
Abdullah Al-Shehri (Saudi Arabia)

=== Panama vs Croatia ===
The two teams had never met before.

Luka Modrić made his 200th appearance for Croatia in his fifth World Cup, becoming the fourth player to reach that number.

In the 54th minute, Ante Budimir scored the only goal of the game for Croatia when he finished at the back post from five yards out after a low cross from Josip Stanišić on the right. With this defeat, Panama were eliminated from the tournament for a second time, the first being in 2018.

June 23, 2026
7:00 p.m. UTC−4

Panama	0–1	Croatia
	(Note: "Panama vs Croatia | First Stage | FIFA World Cup 2026". FIFA. Retrieved June 24, 2026.; "Match Report – Group L – Panama v. Croatia". FIFA. June 24, 2026. Retrieved June 24, 2026.; "Post match summary report – Group L – Panama v. Croatia". FIFA. June 24, 2026. Retrieved June 25, 2026.)	Budimir 54'

BMO Field, Toronto
Attendance: 43,036
Referee: Pierre Atcho (Gabon)

Panama	Croatia

GK	22	Orlando Mosquera
CB	13	Jiovany Ramos		(substituted off) 77'
CB	3	José Córdoba
CB	16	Andrés Andrade
RM	23	Michael Amir Murillo
CM	14	Carlos Harvey
CM	11	Yoel Bárcenas (c)	(yellow card) 61'	(substituted off) 90'
LM	2	César Blackman		(substituted off) 90'
RF	6	Cristian Martínez
CF	17	José Fajardo		(substituted off) 83'
LF	7	José Luis Rodríguez
Substitutions:
FW	18	Cecilio Waterman		(substituted on) 77'
FW	24	Azarias Londoño		(substituted on) 83'
DF	15	Eric Davis		(substituted on) 90'
FW	9	Tomás Rodríguez		(substituted on) 90'
Manager:
(Spain) Thomas Christiansen

GK	1	Dominik Livaković
RB	2	Josip Stanišić
CB	6	Josip Šutalo
CB	3	Marin Pongračić
LB	4	Joško Gvardiol		(substituted off) 46'
CM	10	Luka Modrić (c)		(substituted off) 81'
CM	8	Mateo Kovačić		(substituted off) 72'
RW	24	Marco Pašalić		(substituted off) 72'
AM	16	Martin Baturina
LW	14	Ivan Perišić
CF	26	Petar Musa		(substituted off) 46'
Substitutions:
FW	11	Ante Budimir		(substituted on) 46'
FW	9	Andrej Kramarić		(substituted on) 46'
MF	21	Luka Sučić		(substituted on) 72'
MF	17	Petar Sučić	(yellow card) 90+2'	(substituted on) 72'
MF	15	Mario Pašalić		(substituted on) 81'
Manager:
Zlatko Dalić

Man of the Match:
Cristian Martínez (Panama)

Assistant referees:
Boris Ditsoga (Gabon)
Amos Abeigne Ndong (Gabon)
Fourth official:
Khalid Al-Turais (Saudi Arabia)
Reserve assistant referee:
Mohammed Al-Bakry (Saudi Arabia)
Video assistant referee:
Nicolás Gallo (Colombia)
Assistant video assistant referee:
Fu Ming (China)
Support video assistant referee:
Bastian Dankert (Germany)

=== Panama vs England ===
Action between England and Panama in the second half

The teams had only met once before, when England defeated debutant Panama 6–1 in a group stage match of the 2018 FIFA World Cup.

In the 62nd minute, England went in front when Jude Bellingham scored, hooking the ball into the left of the net from six yards out after a corner from the left by Bukayo Saka. Five minutes later it was 2–0 when Harry Kane headed to the left of the net from six yards out after a cross by Bellingham from the left.

With three additional defeats, Panama now has six overall losses from its two World Cup appearances, remaining winless in its return after 8 years, and left the tournament as the only team that failed to score a goal.

June 27, 2026
5:00 p.m. UTC−4

Panama	0–2	England
	(Note: "Panama vs England | First Stage | FIFA World Cup 2026". FIFA. Retrieved June 27, 2026.; "Match Report – Group L – Panama v. England". FIFA. June 27, 2026. Retrieved June 27, 2026.; "Post match summary report – Group L – Panama v. England". FIFA. June 28, 2026. Retrieved June 28, 2026.)	Bellingham 62'; Kane 67'

MetLife Stadium, East Rutherford
Attendance: 80,663
Referee: Abdulrahman Al-Jassim (Qatar)

Panama	England

GK	22	Orlando Mosquera
CB	4	Fidel Escobar
CB	3	José Córdoba
CB	16	Andrés Andrade	(yellow card) 83'
RM	23	Michael Amir Murillo
CM	14	Carlos Harvey		(substituted off) 88'
CM	11	Yoel Bárcenas (c)		(substituted off) 71'
LM	26	Jorge Gutiérrez		(substituted off) 88'
RF	6	Cristian Martínez
CF	9	Tomás Rodríguez		(substituted off) 46'
LF	7	José Luis Rodríguez		(substituted off) 71'
Substitutions:
FW	17	José Fajardo	(yellow card) 53'	(substituted on) 46'
MF	10	Ismael Díaz		(substituted on) 71'
FW	24	Azarias Londoño		(substituted on) 71'
MF	19	Alberto Quintero		(substituted on) 88'
DF	15	Eric Davis		(substituted on) 88'
Manager:
(Spain) Thomas Christiansen

GK	1	Jordan Pickford
RB	26	Jarell Quansah	(yellow card) 60'	(substituted off) 63'
CB	2	Ezri Konsa
CB	6	Marc Guéhi
LB	3	Nico O'Reilly
CM	8	Elliot Anderson		(substituted off) 84'
CM	10	Jude Bellingham		(substituted off) 71'
RW	7	Bukayo Saka		(substituted off) 63'
AM	17	Morgan Rogers
LW	11	Marcus Rashford
CF	9	Harry Kane (c)		(substituted off) 84'
Substitutions:
DF	25	Djed Spence		(substituted on) 63'
FW	20	Noni Madueke		(substituted on) 63'
MF	21	Eberechi Eze		(substituted on) 71'
FW	19	Ollie Watkins		(substituted on) 84'
MF	14	Jordan Henderson		(substituted on) 84'
Manager:
(Germany) Thomas Tuchel

Man of the Match:
Jude Bellingham (England)

Assistant referees:
Taleb Al-Marri (Qatar)
Saud Al-Maqaleh (Qatar)
Fourth official:
Sandro Schärer (Switzerland)
Reserve assistant referee:
Stéphane De Almeida (Switzerland)
Video assistant referee:
Juan Lara (Chile)
Assistant video assistant referee:
Khamis Al-Marri (Qatar)
Support video assistant referee:
Abdullah Al-Shehri (Saudi Arabia)

=== Croatia vs Ghana ===
The two teams had never met before.

With Croatia's 2–1 win, this meant that both teams advanced to the round of 32, with Croatia facing off Portugal and Ghana up against Colombia.

June 27, 2026
5:00 p.m. UTC−4

Croatia	2–1	Ghana
P. Sučić 31'; Vlašić 83'	(Note: "Croatia vs Ghana | First Stage | FIFA World Cup 2026". FIFA. Retrieved June 27, 2026.; "Match Report – Group L – Croatia v. Ghana". FIFA. June 27, 2026. Retrieved June 27, 2026.; "Post match summary report – Group L – Croatia v. Ghana". FIFA. June 28, 2026. Retrieved June 28, 2026.)	Luckassen 73'

Lincoln Financial Field, Philadelphia
Attendance: 68,324
Referee: Drew Fischer (Canada)

Croatia	Ghana

GK	1	Dominik Livaković
RB	2	Josip Stanišić
CB	6	Josip Šutalo
CB	3	Marin Pongračić
LB	14	Ivan Perišić	(yellow card) 68'
CM	10	Luka Modrić (c)
CM	8	Mateo Kovačić		(substituted off) 78'
RW	17	Petar Sučić
AM	13	Nikola Vlašić		(substituted off) 88'
LW	16	Martin Baturina		(substituted off) 88'
CF	11	Ante Budimir		(substituted off) 66'
Substitutions:
FW	20	Igor Matanović		(substituted on) 66'
MF	15	Mario Pašalić		(substituted on) 78'
DF	4	Joško Gvardiol		(substituted on) 88'
FW	24	Marco Pašalić		(substituted on) 88'
Manager:
Zlatko Dalić

GK	16	Benjamin Asare
RB	26	Marvin Senaya
CB	4	Jonas Adjetey		(substituted off) 46'
CB	23	Derrick Luckassen
LB	14	Gideon Mensah
DM	5	Thomas Partey
CM	15	Elisha Owusu		(substituted off) 46'
CM	8	Kwasi Sibo		(substituted off) 85'
RF	11	Antoine Semenyo
CF	9	Jordan Ayew (c)		(substituted off) 71'
LF	22	Kamaldeen Sulemana		(substituted off) 71'
Substitutions:
DF	21	Kojo Peprah Oppong	(yellow card) 90+4'	(substituted on) 46'
MF	7	Abdul Fatawu		(substituted on) 46'
FW	10	Brandon Thomas-Asante		(substituted on) 71'
FW	24	Ernest Nuamah		(substituted on) 71'
MF	3	Caleb Yirenkyi		(substituted on) 85'
Manager:
(Portugal) Carlos Queiroz

Man of the Match:
Petar Sučić (Croatia)

Assistant referees:
Micheal Barwegen (Canada)
Lyes Arfa (Canada)
Fourth official:
Campbell-Kirk Kawana-Waugh (New Zealand)
Reserve assistant referee:
Isaac Trevis (New Zealand)
Video assistant referee:
Guillermo Pacheco (Mexico)
Assistant video assistant referee:
Rodolpho Toski (Brazil)
Support video assistant referee:
Tomasz Kwiatkowski (Poland)

== Discipline ==
The team conduct ("fair play") score would have been used as a tiebreaker if the head-to-head and overall records of teams were tied. It would also be used as a tiebreaker for the third-place ranking between groups if the overall records of teams were tied. The score was calculated based on yellow and red cards received by players and team officials in all group matches as follows:

- yellow card: −1 point;
- indirect red card (second yellow card): −3 points;
- direct red card: −4 points;
- yellow card and direct red card: −5 points;

Only one of the above deductions could be applied to a player or team official in a single match.

Team	Match 1				Match 2				Match 3				Score
Team	Yellow card	(yellow card) (yellow-red card)	Red card	(yellow card) (red card)	Yellow card	(yellow card) (yellow-red card)	Red card	(yellow card) (red card)	Yellow card	(yellow card) (yellow-red card)	Red card	(yellow card) (red card)	Score
England					1				1				–2
Croatia					1				1				–2
Ghana	1				1				1				−3
Panama	2				1				2				−5
