= 2023–24 CONCACAF Nations League A =

Tournament details
- Dates: Group phase: 7 September – 17 October 2023; Quarter-finals: 16–21 November 2023; Nations League Finals: 21–24 March 2024
- Teams: 16

Final positions
- Champions: United States (3rd title)
- Runners-up: Mexico
- Third place: Jamaica
- Fourth place: Panama
- Relegated: Curaçao; El Salvador; Grenada; Haiti

Tournament statistics
- Matches played: 36
- Goals scored: 101 (2.81 per match)
- Top scorer(s): (Jamaica) Shamar Nicholson (5 goals)

The 2023–24 CONCACAF Nations League A was the top division of the 2023–24 edition of the CONCACAF Nations League, the third season of the international football competition involving the men's national teams of the 41 member associations of CONCACAF. The initial group stage was held from 7 September 2023 to 17 October 2023.

League A culminated with the 2024 CONCACAF Nations League Finals in March 2024 to crown the champions of the CONCACAF Nations League.

This edition of the CONCACAF Nations League A served to determine the six CONCACAF representatives that qualified as guests for the 2024 Copa América in the United States. The four quarter-finals winners and two play-in winners between the four quarter-finals losers qualified to the CONMEBOL tournament.

== Format ==
Starting from this edition, League A was increased from twelve to sixteen teams and a new quarter-final round was introduced. The group stage became two groups of six teams instead of the four groups of three teams of previous editions, and four teams received a direct bye to the quarter-finals. The twelve lowest-ranked teams in the CONCACAF Rankings as of March 2023 entered the group stage and were divided into two groups of six teams, with each team playing four matches against group opponents (two at home and two away) on a Swiss-system format. The top two teams from each group advanced to the quarter-finals, and were joined by the four top-ranked teams in the CONCACAF Rankings as of March 2023. The quarter-finals were played on a two-legged home-and-away basis, with the four winners advancing to the Nations League Finals and qualifying directly to the 2024 Copa América, while the four losers played two single-legged play-in matches for the last two berths to the CONMEBOL tournament.

The Nations League Finals retained its previous format of a semi-final round, third place play-off and final match to determine the champions.

== Teams ==
A total of sixteen national teams contested League A, including the twelve sides from the 2022–23 season and four promoted from the 2022–23 League B. As a result of the expansion to 16 teams, there were no relegated teams last season, so the twelve teams from the 2022–23 season remained in League A for this edition.

=== Team changes ===
The following were the team changes of League A from the 2022–23 season:

Incoming
Promoted from
Nations League B
- Cuba
- Guatemala
- Haiti
- Trinidad and Tobago

Nicaragua originally qualified for promotion to League A as League B Group C winners, but they were disqualified due to fielding an ineligible player. As a result, they were replaced by Trinidad and Tobago on 12 June 2023, and Nicaragua replaced Trinidad and Tobago in League B.

==== Teams promoted from League B ====
Cuba, Haiti, and Trinidad and Tobago returned to League A after a one-season absence. Guatemala reached the top division of the CONCACAF Nations League for the first time after starting in League C in the inaugural edition and moving up from League B the previous season.

=== Seeding ===
The pots were confirmed on 2 May 2023, with the lowest twelve League A ranked teams, based on the CONCACAF Rankings as of 31 March 2023, being split into six pots of two teams. The top four ranked teams (Mexico, the United States, Canada and Costa Rica) were directly seeded in the quarter-finals.

Pot	Team	Pts	Rank
1	Panama	1,695	5
1	Haiti	1,482	6
2	Jamaica	1,479	7
2	Guatemala	1,405	8
3	Honduras	1,403	9
3	El Salvador	1,330	10
4	Martinique	1,246	12
4	Cuba	1,176	13
5	Curaçao	1,171	14
5	Suriname	1,079	16
6	Trinidad and Tobago	1,254	11
6	Grenada	791	25

=== Draw ===
The group stage draw was held on 16 May 2023, 19:00 EDT, in Miami, Florida, United States where the twelve involved teams were drawn into two groups of six. The draw began by randomly selecting a team from Pot 1 and placing them in Group A and then selecting the remaining team from Pot 1 and placing them in Group B. The draw continued with the same procedure done for the remaining pots.

The draw resulted in the following groups:

Group A
Pos	Team
A1	Panama
A2	Guatemala
A3	El Salvador
A4	Martinique
A5	Curaçao
A6	Trinidad and Tobago

Group B
Pos	Team
B1	Haiti
B2	Jamaica
B3	Honduras
B4	Cuba
B5	Suriname
B6	Grenada

== Group stage ==
The fixture list was confirmed by CONCACAF on 6 July 2023. All match times are in EDT (UTC−4) as listed by CONCACAF (local times, if different, are in parentheses).

=== Group A ===
Pos	Team	Pld	W	D	L	GF	GA	GD	Pts	Qualification or relegation	(Panama)	(Trinidad and Tobago)	(Martinique)	(Guatemala)	(Curaçao)	(El Salvador)
1	Panama	4	3	1	0	9	2	+7	10	Advance to quarter-finals	—	—	3–0	3–0	—	—
2	Trinidad and Tobago	4	3	0	1	10	9	+1	9	Advance to quarter-finals	—	—	—	3–2	1–0	—
3	Martinique	4	2	1	1	2	3	−1	7		—	—	—	—	1–0	1–0
4	Guatemala	4	1	1	2	5	7	−2	4		1–1	—	—	—	—	2–0
5	Curaçao (R)	4	1	0	3	6	7	−1	3	Relegation to League B	1–2	5–3	—	—	—	—
6	El Salvador (R)	4	0	1	3	2	6	−4	1	Relegation to League B	—	2–3	0–0	—	—	—

Source: CONCACAF
Rules for classification: Tiebreakers
(R) Relegated
7 September 2023
18:00

Trinidad and Tobago	1–0	Curaçao
James 87'	Report

Hasely Crawford Stadium, Port of Spain
Attendance: 5,181
Referee: Daneon Parchment (Jamaica)
7 September 2023
20:00 (19:00 UTC−5)

Panama	3–0	Martinique
Fajardo 9'; Moltenis 47' (o.g.); Waterman 90+3'	Report

Estadio Universitario, Penonomé
Attendance: 3,145
Referee: Marco Ortíz (Mexico)
7 September 2023
22:00 (20:00 UTC−6)

Guatemala	2–0	El Salvador
Mejía 15'; Altán 78'	Report

Estadio Doroteo Guamuch Flores, Guatemala City
Attendance: 18,313
Referee: Selvin Brown (Honduras)

10 September 2023
20:00 (Note: The Martinique v Curaçao match, originally scheduled at 16:00 EDT (UTC−4), was rescheduled to 20:00 EDT due to logistical reasons.)

Martinique	1–0	Curaçao
Labeau 48'	Report

Stade Pierre-Aliker, Fort-de-France
Attendance: 913
Referee: Juan Gabriel Calderón (Costa Rica)
10 September 2023
20:00 (18:00 UTC−6)

Guatemala	1–1	Panama
Santis 71'	Report	Davis 7' (pen.)

Estadio Doroteo Guamuch Flores, Guatemala City
Attendance: 18,313
Referee: Saíd Martínez (Honduras)
10 September 2023
22:00 (20:00 UTC−6)

El Salvador	2–3	Trinidad and Tobago
Zavaleta 17'; B. Gil 53'	Report	Telfer 22'; Shaw 51' (pen.); Garcia 72'

Estadio Jorge "El Mágico" González, San Salvador
Referee: Ricardo Montero (Costa Rica)

13 October 2023
17:00

Curaçao	1–2	Panama
Janga 90+4'	Report	Bárcenas 29'; Rodríguez 77'

Ergilio Hato Stadium, Willemstad
Referee: Ismail Elfath (United States)
13 October 2023
19:00

Martinique	1–0	El Salvador
Marajo 23'	Report

Stade Pierre-Aliker, Fort-de-France
Attendance: 877
Referee: César Ramos (Mexico)
13 October 2023
21:00

Trinidad and Tobago	3–2	Guatemala
Jones 36' (pen.); Moore 54'; James 89'	Report	Rubin 12'; Santis 31'

Hasely Crawford Stadium, Port of Spain
Referee: Iván Barton (El Salvador)

17 October 2023
21:00 (20:00 UTC−5)

Panama	3–0	Guatemala
Carrasquilla 14'; Davis 48' (pen.); Ayarza 90'	Report

Estadio Rommel Fernández, Panama City
Attendance: 13,536
Referee: Armando Villarreal (United States)
17 October 2023
21:00 (19:00 UTC−6)

El Salvador	0–0	Martinique
	Report

Estadio Jorge "El Mágico" González, San Salvador
Attendance: 5,605
Referee: Drew Fischer (Canada)
17 October 2023
21:00

Curaçao	5–3	Trinidad and Tobago
Janga 7', 81'; Roemeratoe 12'; Gorré 56' (pen.); J. Bacuna 78' (pen.)	Report	Moore 68'; Lee-Him 74'; Moses 86'

Ergilio Hato Stadium, Willemstad
Attendance: 1,043
Referee: Saíd Martínez (Honduras)

=== Group B ===
Pos	Team	Pld	W	D	L	GF	GA	GD	Pts	Qualification or relegation	(Jamaica)	(Honduras)	(Suriname)	(Cuba)	(Haiti)	(Grenada)
1	Jamaica	4	3	1	0	10	5	+5	10	Advance to quarter-finals	—	1–0	—	—	2–2	—
2	Honduras	4	2	1	1	8	1	+7	7	Advance to quarter-finals	—	—	—	4–0	—	4–0
3	Suriname	4	1	2	1	6	3	+3	5		—	—	—	—	1–1	4–0
4	Cuba	4	1	2	1	1	4	−3	5		—	0–0	1–0	—	—	—
5	Haiti (R)	4	0	3	1	5	6	−1	3	Relegation to League B	2–3	—	—	0–0	—	—
6	Grenada (R)	4	0	1	3	2	13	−11	1	Relegation to League B	1–4	—	1–1	—	—	—

Source: CONCACAF
Rules for classification: Tiebreakers
(R) Relegated
8 September 2023
16:00

Haiti	0–0	Cuba
	Report

Estadio Panamericano, San Cristóbal (Dominican Republic) (Note: Haiti played their home match against Cuba at Estadio Panamericano in San Cristóbal (Dominican Republic) due to the ongoing Haitian crisis.)
Attendance: 550
Referee: Randy Encarnación (Dominican Republic)
8 September 2023
19:00

Grenada	1–1	Suriname
Lewis 85'	Report	Te Vrede 87'

Kirani James Athletic Stadium, St. George's
Attendance: 2,994
Referee: Kwinsi Williams (Trinidad and Tobago)
8 September 2023
21:00 (20:00 UTC−5)

Jamaica	1–0	Honduras
D. Gray 64'	Report

Independence Park, Kingston
Attendance: 3,800
Referee: Daniel Quintero (Mexico)

12 September 2023
16:00

Cuba	1–0	Suriname
Pozo 21'	Report

Estadio Antonio Maceo, Santiago de Cuba
Attendance: 3,500
Referee: Fernando Guerrero (Mexico)
12 September 2023
20:00 (19:00 UTC−5)

Jamaica	2–2	Haiti
Adé 51' (o.g.); De Cordova-Reid 83' (pen.)	Report	Deedson 12', 15'

Independence Park, Kingston
Referee: César Ramos (Mexico)
12 September 2023
22:00 (20:00 UTC−6)

Honduras	4–0	Grenada
Rodríguez 45+2', 65'; Lozano 51'; Palma 60' (pen.)	Report

Estadio Nacional Chelato Uclés, Tegucigalpa
Referee: Iván Barton (El Salvador)

12 October 2023
18:00 (19:00 UTC−3)

Suriname	1–1	Haiti
Haps 17'	Report	Cantave 51'

Dr. Ir. Franklin Essed Stadion, Paramaribo
Attendance: 2,553
Referee: Víctor Cáceres (Mexico)
12 October 2023
19:00

Grenada	1–4	Jamaica
Williams 30'	Report	Williams 12'; Nicholson 22'; D. Gray 74'; De Cordova-Reid 87'

Kirani James Athletic Stadium, St. George's
Attendance: 4,394
Referee: Joe Dickerson (United States)
12 October 2023
21:00

Cuba	0–0	Honduras
	Report

Félix Sánchez Olympic Stadium, Santo Domingo (Dominican Republic) (Note: Cuba played their home match against Honduras at the Félix Sánchez Olympic Stadium in Santo Domingo (Dominican Republic) instead of their regular stadium Estadio Antonio Maceo which did not meet CONCACAF requirements for hosting the match at night.)
Referee: Walter López (Guatemala)

15 October 2023
20:00

Haiti	2–3	Jamaica
Pierrot 15', 87'	Report	D. Gray 18'; Nicholson 57'; Bailey 66'

Hasely Crawford Stadium, Port of Spain (Trinidad and Tobago) (Note: Haiti played their home match against Jamaica at Hasely Crawford Stadium in Port of Spain (Trinidad and Tobago) due to the ongoing Haitian crisis.)
Referee: Keylor Herrera (Costa Rica)
15 October 2023
20:00 (18:00 UTC−6)

Honduras	4–0	Cuba
Maldonado 9'; Lozano 13'; Quioto 67' (pen.); Róchez 90+1'	Report

Estadio Nacional Chelato Uclés, Tegucigalpa
Attendance: 10,899
Referee: Mario Escobar (Guatemala)
15 October 2023
20:00 (21:00 UTC−3)

Suriname	4–0	Grenada
Van der Kust 12'; Vlijter 27'; Abena 35'; Bedeau 45+3' (o.g.)	Report

Dr. Ir. Franklin Essed Stadion, Paramaribo
Attendance: 1,285
Referee: Christopher Mason (Jamaica)

== Quarter-finals ==
The quarter-finals pairings were determined based on the CONCACAF Rankings published after the October 2023 FIFA Match Window for the four pre-seeded teams and the group stage results for the winners and runners-up of each group.

Seeded teams
Pos	Team	Rank (Note: CONCACAF rankings (as of 18 October 2023))	Pts
1	Mexico	1	1,967
2	United States	2	1,909
3	Canada	4	1,729
4	Costa Rica	5	1,676

Group stage winners and runners-up
Rank	Team	Pld	W	D	L	GF	GA	GD	Pts
1	Panama	4	3	1	0	9	2	+7	10
2	Jamaica	4	3	1	0	10	5	+5	10
3	Trinidad and Tobago	4	3	0	1	10	9	+1	9
4	Honduras	4	2	1	1	8	1	+7	7

Source: CONCACAF
Rules for classification: Tiebreakers

The match-ups were as follows:

- Quarter-final 1 (QF1): Fourth-ranked seeded team vs. Best-ranked group winner
- Quarter-final 2 (QF2): Third-ranked seeded team vs. Next best-ranked group winner
- Quarter-final 3 (QF3): Second-ranked seeded team vs. Best-ranked group runner-up
- Quarter-final 4 (QF4): First-ranked seeded team vs. Next best-ranked group runner-up

Each tie was played on a home-and-away two-legged basis, with the order of legs being decided by the four pre-seeded teams that received a direct bye to the quarter-finals (Canada, Costa Rica, Mexico, and the United States). If the aggregate score is level at the end of the second leg the away goals rule would be applied. If away goals were also equal, then 30 minutes of extra time would be played without taking into account the away goals rule during this time. If still tied after extra time, the tie would be decided by a penalty shoot-out.

Winners advanced to the Nations League Finals and qualified for the 2024 Copa América, while losers advanced to the Copa América qualifying play-offs.

=== Summary ===
The first legs were played from 16 to 18 November, and the second legs were played on 20 and 21 November 2023.

Team 1	Agg.	Team 2	1st leg	2nd leg
Costa Rica	1–6	Panama	0–3	1–3
Jamaica	4–4 (a)	Canada	1–2	3–2
United States	4–2	Trinidad and Tobago	3–0	1–2
Honduras	2–2 (2–4 p)	Mexico	2–0	0–2 (a.e.t.)

=== Matches ===
The fixture list was confirmed by CONCACAF on 6 July 2023. All match times are in EST (UTC−5) as listed by CONCACAF (local times, if different, are in parentheses).

16 November 2023
22:00 (21:00 UTC−6)

Costa Rica	0–3	Panama
	Report	Murillo 4'; Fajardo 29'; Waterman 60'

Estadio Ricardo Saprissa Aymá, San Juan
Attendance: 17,787
Referee: Mario Escobar (Guatemala)
20 November 2023
21:00

Panama	3–1	Costa Rica
Fajardo 21'; Rodríguez 24'; Bárcenas 43' (pen.)	Report	Calvo 52'

Estadio Rommel Fernández, Panama City
Attendance: 15,288
Referee: Saíd Martínez (Honduras)

Panama won 6–1 on aggregate, advanced to the Finals, and qualified for the 2024 Copa América. Costa Rica advanced to the play-in.

16 November 2023
21:00 (20:00 UTC−6)

United States	3–0	Trinidad and Tobago
Pepi 82'; Robinson 86'; Reyna 89'	Report

Q2 Stadium, Austin
Attendance: 19,850
Referee: Oshane Nation (Jamaica)
20 November 2023
19:00 (20:00 UTC−4)

Trinidad and Tobago	2–1	United States
Moore 43'; Jones 57'	Report	Robinson 25'

Hasely Crawford Stadium, Port of Spain
Attendance: 9,438
Referee: Walter López (Guatemala)

United States won 4–2 on aggregate, advanced to the Finals, and qualified to the 2024 Copa América. Trinidad and Tobago advanced to the play-in.

18 November 2023 (Note: The Jamaica–Canada match was postponed from its original start time (17 November at 19:00) due to weather conditions caused by a tropical storm.)
10:30

Jamaica	1–2	Canada
Nicholson 56'	Report	David 45+1'; Eustáquio 86'

Independence Park, Kingston
Attendance: 3,500
Referee: Tori Penso (United States)
21 November 2023
19:30

Canada	2–3	Jamaica
Davies 25'; Koné 69'	Report	Nicholson 63', 66'; De Cordova-Reid 78' (pen.)

BMO Field, Toronto
Attendance: 17,588
Referee: César Ramos (Mexico)

4–4 on aggregate. Jamaica won on away goals, advanced to the Finals, and qualified for the 2024 Copa América. Canada advanced to the play-in.

17 November 2023
21:00 (20:00 UTC−6)

Honduras	2–0	Mexico
Lozano 30'; Róchez 72'	Report

Estadio Nacional Chelato Uclés, Tegucigalpa
Attendance: 22,444
Referee: Juan Gabriel Calderón (Costa Rica)
21 November 2023
21:30 (20:30 UTC−6)

Mexico	2–0 (a.e.t.)	Honduras
Chávez 43'; Álvarez 90+11'	Report
Penalties
Giménez (penalty scored); Vásquez (penalty scored); Pineda (penalty scored); Huerta (penalty scored)	4–2	(penalty missed) Róchez; (penalty scored) Acosta; (penalty scored) Elis; (penalty missed) Najar

Estadio Azteca, Mexico City
Attendance: 70,078
Referee: Iván Barton (El Salvador)

2–2 on aggregate. Mexico won 4–2 on penalties, advanced to the Finals, and qualified for the 2024 Copa América. Honduras advanced to the play-in.

== Nations League Finals ==
=== Seeding ===
The four teams were ranked based on their results in both legs of the quarter-finals to determine the semi-final matchups. The first seed played the fourth seed and the second seed played the third seed.

Seed	QF	Team	Pld	W	D	L	GF	GA	GD	Pts
1	1	Panama	2	2	0	0	6	1	+5	6
2	3	United States	2	1	0	1	4	2	+2	3
3	2	Jamaica	2	1	0	1	4	4	0	3
4	4	Mexico	2	1	0	1	2	2	0	3

Source: CONCACAF
Rules for classification: Tiebreakers

=== Bracket ===
Semi-finals
21 March – Arlington
Panama	0
Mexico	3
21 March – Arlington
United States (a.e.t.)	3
Jamaica	1

Final
24 March – Arlington
Mexico	0
United States	2
Third place play-off
24 March – Arlington
Panama	0
Jamaica	1

All match times are in EDT (UTC−4) as listed by CONCACAF (local times are in parentheses).

=== Semi-finals ===
21 March 2024
19:00 (18:00 UTC−5)

United States	3–1 (a.e.t.)	Jamaica
Burke 90+6' (o.g.); Wright 96', 109'	Report	Leigh 1'

AT&T Stadium, Arlington
Attendance: 40,926
Referee: Selvin Brown (Honduras)

21 March 2024
22:15 (21:15 UTC−5)

Panama	0–3	Mexico
	Report	Álvarez 40'; Quiñones 43'; Pineda 67'

AT&T Stadium, Arlington
Attendance: 40,926
Referee: Walter López (Guatemala)

=== Third place play-off ===
24 March 2024
18:00 (17:00 UTC−5)

Panama	0–1	Jamaica
	Report	Lembikisa 42'

AT&T Stadium, Arlington
Referee: Tori Penso (United States)

=== Final ===
24 March 2024
21:15 (20:15 UTC−5)

Mexico	0–2	United States
	Report	Adams 45'; Reyna 63'

AT&T Stadium, Arlington
Attendance: 59,471
Referee: Drew Fischer (Canada)

== Goalscorers ==
There were 101 goals scored in 36 matches, for an average of 2.81 goals per match.

5 goals

- (Jamaica) Shamar Nicholson

3 goals

- (Curaçao) Rangelo Janga
- (Honduras) Anthony Lozano
- (Jamaica) Bobby De Cordova-Reid
- (Jamaica) Demarai Gray
- (Panama) José Fajardo
- (Trinidad and Tobago) Reon Moore

2 goals

- (Guatemala) Oscar Santis
- (Haiti) Louicius Deedson
- (Haiti) Frantzdy Pierrot
- (Honduras) Bryan Róchez
- (Honduras) Edwin Rodríguez
- (Mexico) Edson Álvarez
- (Panama) Yoel Bárcenas
- (Panama) Eric Davis
- (Panama) José Luis Rodríguez
- (Panama) Cecilio Waterman
- (Trinidad and Tobago) Nathaniel James
- (Trinidad and Tobago) Alvin Jones
- (United States) Giovanni Reyna
- (United States) Antonee Robinson
- (United States) Haji Wright

1 goal

- (Canada) Jonathan David
- (Canada) Alphonso Davies
- (Canada) Stephen Eustáquio
- (Canada) Ismaël Koné
- (Costa Rica) Francisco Calvo
- (Cuba) Willian Pozo
- (Curaçao) Juninho Bacuna
- (Curaçao) Kenji Gorré
- (Curaçao) Godfried Roemeratoe
- (El Salvador) Brayan Gil
- (El Salvador) Eriq Zavaleta
- (Grenada) Saydrel Lewis
- (Grenada) Trevon Williams
- (Guatemala) Pedro Altán
- (Guatemala) Carlos Mejía
- (Guatemala) Rubio Rubin
- (Haiti) Mikaël Cantave
- (Honduras) Denil Maldonado
- (Honduras) Luis Palma
- (Honduras) Romell Quioto
- (Jamaica) Leon Bailey
- (Jamaica) Greg Leigh
- (Jamaica) Dexter Lembikisa
- (Jamaica) Romario Williams
- (Martinique) Brighton Labeau
- (Martinique) Johnny Marajo
- (Mexico) Luis Chávez
- (Mexico) Orbelín Pineda
- (Mexico) Julián Quiñones
- (Panama) Abdiel Ayarza
- (Panama) Adalberto Carrasquilla
- (Panama) Michael Amir Murillo
- (Suriname) Myenty Abena
- (Suriname) Ridgeciano Haps
- (Suriname) Mitchell te Vrede
- (Suriname) Djevencio van der Kust
- (Suriname) Gleofilo Vlijter
- (Trinidad and Tobago) Justin Garcia
- (Trinidad and Tobago) Kristian Lee-Him
- (Trinidad and Tobago) Kareem Moses
- (Trinidad and Tobago) Malcolm Shaw
- (Trinidad and Tobago) Ryan Telfer
- (United States) Tyler Adams
- (United States) Ricardo Pepi

1 own goal

- (Grenada) Jacob Bedeau (against Suriname)
- (Haiti) Ricardo Adé (against Jamaica)
- (Jamaica) Cory Burke (against United States)
- (Martinique) Boris Moltenis (against Panama)
