= Razak Simpson =

Ghanaian professional footballer

Personal information
- Date of birth: 15 July 1998 (age 28)
- Place of birth: Mampong, Ghana
- Height: 1.90 m (6 ft 3 in)
- Position: Defender

Team information
- Current team: Vaasan Palloseura
- Number: 3

Youth career
- Elite Soccer Academy

Senior career*
Years	Team	Apps	(Gls)
2019–2021	Ashanti Gold	4	(0)
2021	→ Liberty Professionals (loan)	16	(0)
2021–2023	WAFA	13	(0)
2023–2026	Nations FC	83	(9)
2026–	VPS	12	(0)

International career^{‡}
2024–	Ghana	8	(1)
- * Club domestic league appearances and goals as of 13 November 2026 ‡ National team caps and goals as of 15 July 2026

Razak Simpson (born 15 July 1998) is a Ghanaian professional footballer who plays as a defender for Veikkausliiga side Vaasan Palloseura and the Ghana national team.

== Club career ==
Simpson started his career with Elite Soccer Academy. In July 2019, he was signed by Obuasi-based team Ashanti Gold on a 5-year deal. He become the club's third signing of the season with Isaac Opoku Agyemang and Kwadwo Amoako being the first and second. He made his debut on 15 January 2020, coming on as a substitute in the 57 minute for Musa Mohammed in a goalless draw match against Legon Cities.

In March 2021, Simpson joined Liberty Professionals on loan until the end of the season. He made his debut against on 4 April 2021, in a 2–0 loss to Bechem United. He is currently at Nations FC. The following weekend he played the full 90 minutes and helped Liberty to keep a clean sheet in a 4–0 victory over Elmina Sharks. During his loan spell, he featured in 16 league matches, only missing one within the second half of the season. He also won one man of the match award.

On 2 July 2026, Simpson joined VPS in Finland on a three-year contract.

== International career ==
Simpson made his Ghana national team debut on 15 November 2024 in an Africa Cup of Nations qualifier against Angola at the Estádio 11 de Novembro. He played the full game in a 1–1 draw.

He scored his first goal for Ghana on 31 May 2025 during the 2025 Unity Cup third-place playoff, which Ghana won 4–0 against Trinidad and Tobago.

== Career statistics ==
=== International ===
As of match played 22 May 2026

National team	Year	Apps	Goals
Ghana	2024	4	0
Ghana	2025	3	1
Ghana	2026	1	0
Total		8	1

Ghana score listed first, score column indicates score after each Simpson goal.

List of international goals scored by Razak Simpson
No.	Date	Venue	Cap	Opponent	Score	Result	Competition	Ref.
1	31 May 2025	Brentford Community Stadium, London, England	4	Trinidad and Tobago	2–0	4–0	2025 Unity Cup	
