= Isaiah Leacock =

Trinidadian association football player

Personal information
- Full name: Isaiah Israel Leacock
- Date of birth: 11 November 1999 (age 26)
- Place of birth: Trinidad and Tobago
- Position: Forward

Team information
- Current team: Defence Force
- Number: 12

Senior career*
Years	Team	Apps	(Gls)
2022–2023	Harlem Strikers		(5+)
2023–2024	AC Port of Spain	7	(0)
2024–	Defence Force		(14+)

International career^{‡}
2025–	Trinidad and Tobago	2	(1)
- * Club domestic league appearances and goals as of 20 May 2025 (UTC) ‡ National team caps and goals as of 23:29, 22 October 2025 (UTC)

Isaiah Israel "Bongo" Leacock (born 11 November 1999) is a Trinidadian professional footballer who plays as a forward for TT Premier Football League club Defence Force F.C. and the Trinidad and Tobago national team.

== Club career ==
Nicknamed Bongo, Isaiah Leacock began his career in 2022 with Harlem Strikers, scoring a hat-trick on the final matchday as the club finished third in the 2022–23 TT Premier Football League 2.

He then moved to AC Port of Spain in 2023 and made seven appearances for the club. He then joined Defence Force in January 2024, where he won the 2024 Trinidad and Tobago League Cup with the club, scoring a hat-trick in the final against his former club AC Port of Spain.

He then won the 2024–25 TT Premier Football League title with Defence Force and became the league's joint top scorer with fourteen goals across at least twelve matches and sixteen goals across all competitions.

He has shirt number 12 for the 2025–26 season.

== International career ==
Ahead of the 2025 Unity Cup, Leacock received his first call up to the Trinidad and Tobago national team in May 2025. He debuted on 28 May 2025 during the 3–2 semi-final loss against Jamaica in which he also scored his first international goal. He also played the last minute of the 1–1 draw at the 2025 CONCACAF Gold Cup against Haiti on 19 July 2025.

== Career statistics ==
=== International ===
As of match played 19 July 2025.

National team	Year	Apps	Goals
Trinidad and Tobago	2025	2	1
Total		2	1

Trinidad and Tobago score listed first, score column indicates score after each Leacock goal.

List of international goals scored by Isaiah Leacock
No.	Date	Venue	Cap	Opponent	Score	Result	Competition	Ref.
1	28 May 2025	Brentford Community Stadium, London, England	1	Jamaica	2–2	2–3	2025 Unity Cup	

== Honours ==
Harlem Strikers

- TT Premier Football League 2
  - Third place (1): 2022–23

Defence Force

- TT Premier Football League
  - Champions (1): 2024–25
- Trinidad and Tobago League Cup
  - Champions (1): 2024
