= Ifeanyi Onyebuchi =

Nigeria Professional Footballer

Personal information
- Full name: Ifeanyi Emmanuel Onyebuchi
- Date of birth: 4 April 2000 (age 26)
- Place of birth: Kaduna, Nigeria
- Position: Centre-back

Team information
- Current team: Rangers International
- Number: 34

Senior career*
Years	Team	Apps	(Gls)
2020–	Rangers International	129	(9)

International career^{‡}
2025–	Nigeria	1	(0)
- * Club domestic league appearances and goals as of 31 May 2026 ‡ National team caps and goals as of 31 May 2026

Ifeanyi Emmanuel Onyebuchi (born 4 April 2000) is a Nigerian professional footballer who plays as a centre-back for Rangers International F.C. and the Nigeria national football team.

== Club career ==
Onyebuchi has featured for Plateau United, MFM FC and FC Shkupi located in North Macedonia. He currently play for Rangers International F.C. in the Nigeria Premier Football League.

== International career ==
In March 2025, he was named in thirty-nine provisional players to play in the 2026 FIFA World Cup qualifier against Rwanda and Zimbabwe by Eric Chelle. In May 2025, he was invited to the 2025 Unity Cup in London where he made his international debut for the Nigeria national team.
