= Lawrence Agyekum =

Ghanaian professional footballer

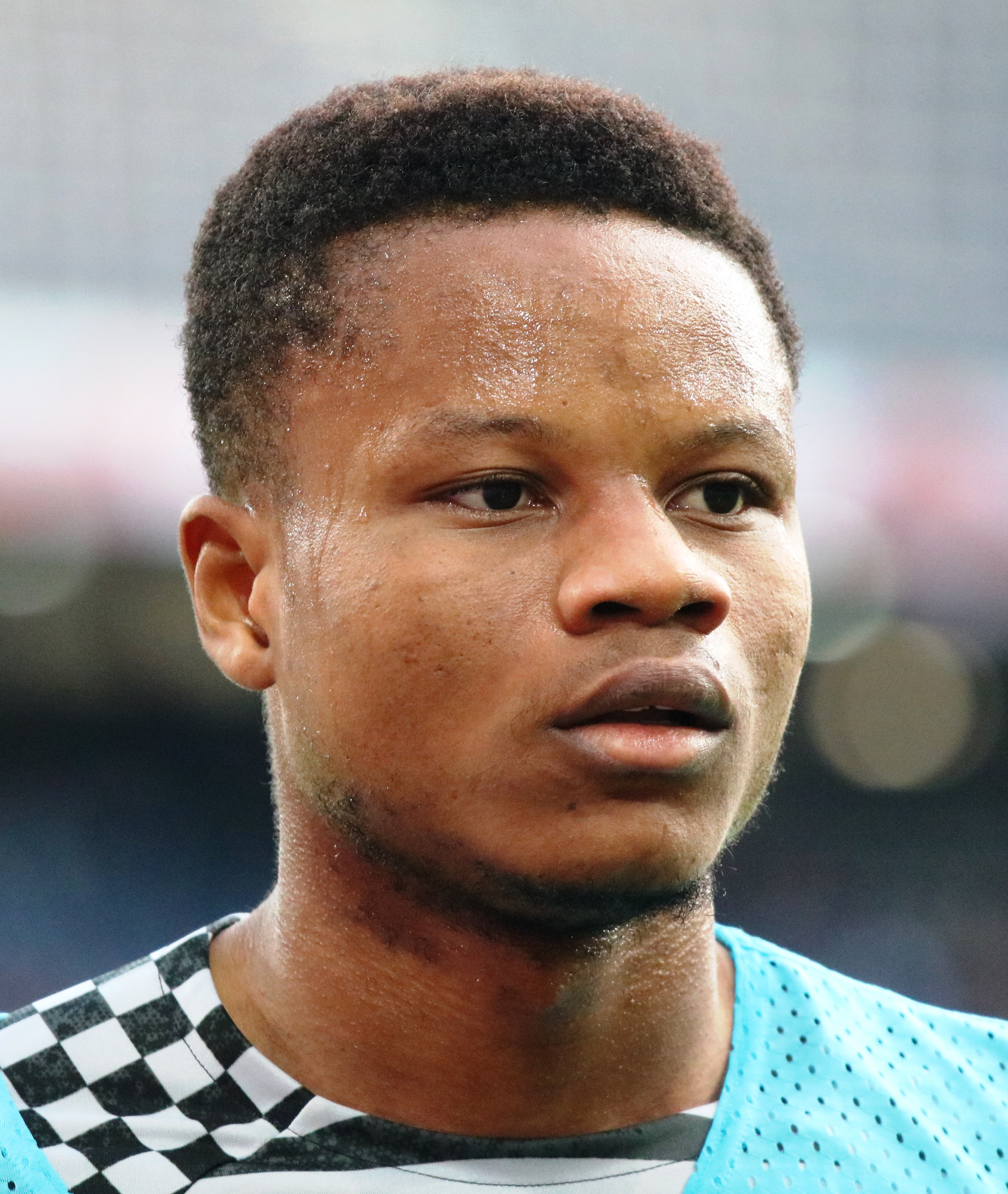

Personal information
- Date of birth: 23 November 2003 (age 22)
- Place of birth: Ghana
- Height: 1.74 m (5 ft 9 in)
- Position: Midfielder

Team information
- Current team: Erzurumspor (on loan from Cercle Brugge)
- Number: 77

Senior career*
Years	Team	Apps	(Gls)
2019–2022	WAFA	41	(5)
2022–2025	Red Bull Salzburg	3	(0)
2022–2024	→ FC Liefering (loan)	49	(3)
2024–2025	→ Cercle Brugge (loan)	33	(2)
2025–	Cercle Brugge	31	(0)
2026–	→ Erzurumspor (loan)	0	(0)

International career^{‡}
2025–	Ghana	3	(1)
- * Club domestic league appearances and goals as of 20 September 2026 ‡ National team caps and goals as of 14:48, 31 March 2025 (UTC)

Lawrence Agyekum (born 23 November 2003) is a Ghanaian professional footballer who plays as a midfielder for Süper Lig club Erzurumspor in Turkey on loan from Belgian club Cercle Brugge, and the Ghana national team.

== Club career ==
=== WAFA ===
Agyekum started his career with West African Football Academy, he was promoted to the senior team in December 2019. He made his debut on 24 January 2020, after coming on for Michael Danso Agyemang in a 2–1 loss to Liberty Professionals. The 2019–20 season was however cancelled due to the restrictions to control the COVID-19 pandemic in Ghana. He made 5 league appearances before the league was cancelled. Prior to the restart of the league, he was named on the club's squad list for the 2020–21 season. He scored his debut goal on 24 February 2021, after scoring the third goal in the 92nd minute in a 3–1 victory over Karela United. Agyekum was adjudged the man of the match after putting up a good performance in a league match against Elmina Sharks even though WAFA lost by 1–0.

=== RB Salzburg ===
On 7 February 2022, Agyekum signed a contract with Austrian club Red Bull Salzburg until 30 June 2026 and was assigned to Red Bull Salzburg's partner club FC Liefering.

==== Loan to Cercle Brugge ====
On 4 July 2024, Agyekum was loaned to Belgian Pro League club Cercle Brugge, with an option to buy.

== International career ==
Agyekum made his debut for Ghana on 21 March 2025 as a late second-half substitute during a 5–0 win against Chad during 2026 FIFA World Cup qualification.

He scored his first goal for Ghana on 31 May 2025 during the 2025 Unity Cup third-place playoff, which Ghana won 4–0 against Trinidad and Tobago.

== Career statistics ==
=== International ===
As of match played 31 May 2025.

National team	Year	Apps	Goals
Ghana	2025	3	1
Total		3	1

Ghana score listed first, score column indicates score after each Agyekum goal.

List of international goals scored by Lawrence Agyekum
No.	Date	Venue	Cap	Opponent	Score	Result	Competition	Ref.
1	31 May 2025	Brentford Community Stadium, London, England	3	Trinidad and Tobago	4–0	4–0	2025 Unity Cup	
