= Caleb Yirenkyi =

Ghanaian footballer (born 2006)

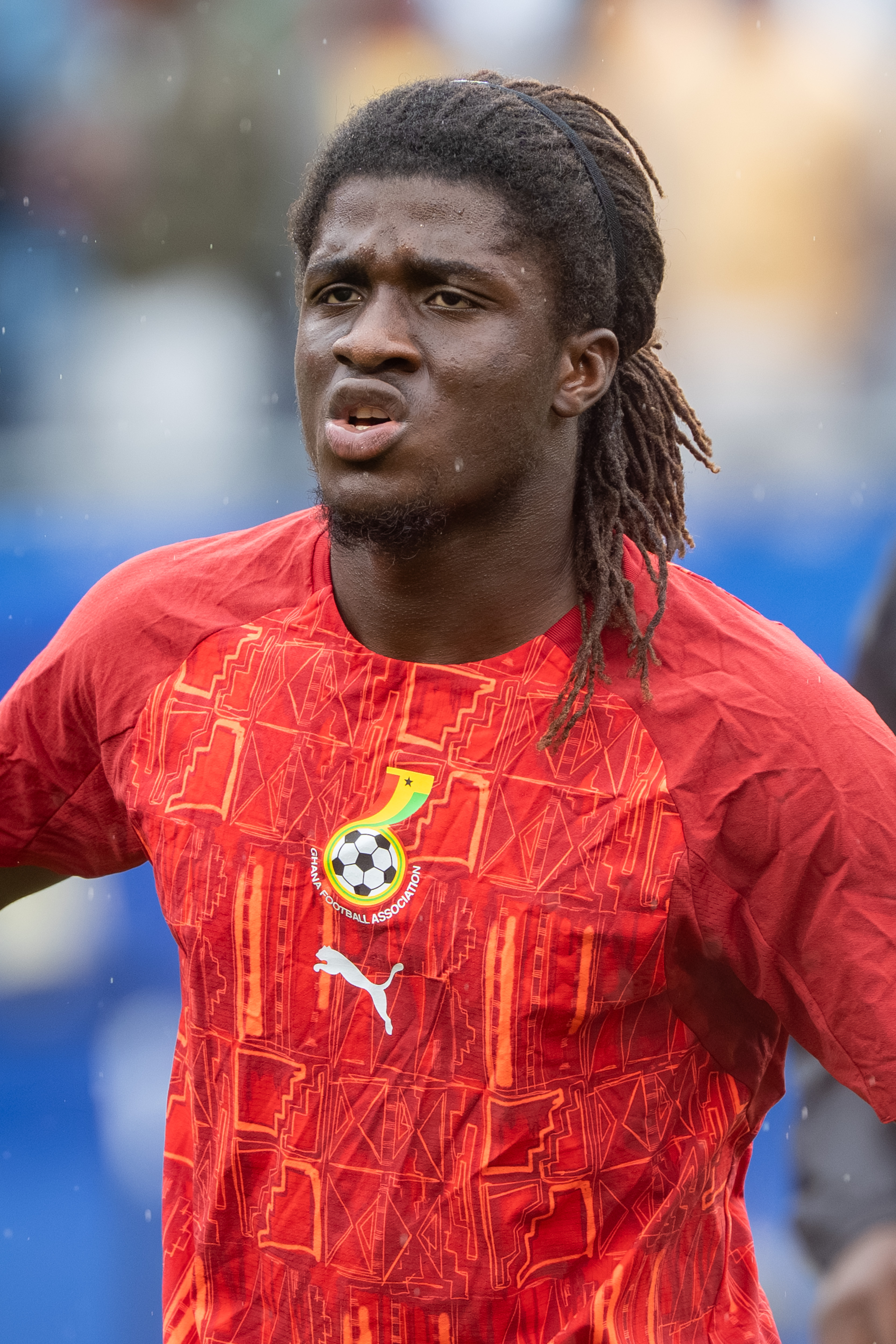
- Yirenkyi with Ghana in 2026

Personal information
- Full name: Caleb Marfo Yirenkyi
- Date of birth: 15 January 2006 (age 20)
- Place of birth: Bechem, Ghana
- Height: 1.82 m (6 ft 0 in)
- Position: Central midfielder

Team information
- Current team: Coventry City
- Number: 8

Youth career
- 2017–2024: Right to Dream
- 2024: Nordsjælland

Senior career*
Years	Team	Apps	(Gls)
2024–2026	Nordsjælland	49	(4)
2026–	Coventry City	7	(0)

International career^{‡}
2025–	Ghana	15	(2)
- * Club domestic league appearances and goals as of 13 October 2026 ‡ National team caps and goals as of 11:20, 4 July 2026 (UTC)

Caleb Marfo Yirenkyi (born 15 January 2006) is a Ghanaian professional footballer who plays as a central midfielder for Premier League club Coventry City and the Ghana national team.

== Club career ==
=== Nordsjælland ===
Born in Bechem, Ghana, Yirenkyi was a product of the Right to Dream Academy, which he joined in 2017 at the age of 11. He turned 18 in January 2024 and in March 2024 FC Nordsjælland confirmed that Yirenkyi became part of the club's academy and had just made his debut for the club's U-19 team.

In the summer of 2024, Yirenkyi attended a training camp with the Nordsjælland first team squad. From here he started training more with the first team.

Yirenkyi sat on the bench in Nordsjælland's first two matches in the 2024–25 Danish Superliga. His debut came on 20 September 2024, when he replaced Peter Ankersen in the 85th minute in a match against Viborg FF.

On 2 February 2025, Nordsjælland confirmed that Yirenkyi had been permanently promoted to the first team squad and had signed a new contract until the end of 2029. Yirenkyi quickly established himself in the team right after his contract extension, starting in the first three matches of the year. His performances led to the media beginning to draw comparisons between him and Michael Essien. In October that year, he extended his contract with Nordsjælland again, until summer 2030.

=== Coventry City ===
On 7 August 2026, Yirenkyi joined Premier League club Coventry City for an undisclosed club record fee on a long-term contract. The transfer was reportedly completed for a club-record and Danish league-record fee of €25 million.

== International career ==
In May 2025, Yirenkyi received his first call-up to the Ghana senior national team for the 2025 Unity Cup.

He made his debut on 28 May 2025 against Nigeria, coming on at the start of the second half in a 1–2 defeat.

On 2 June, he was selected in the 26-man squad for the 2026 FIFA World Cup. He scored his first international goal on the same day in a 1–1 draw against Wales.

On 17 June, he scored a stoppage-time goal on his World Cup debut, securing a 1–0 win over Panama and becoming the second-youngest player to score for Ghana at a World Cup behind Haminu Draman. The 95th-minute strike was also Ghana's latest ever goal scored in regulation time at a World Cup.

== Career statistics ==
=== Club ===
As of match played 6 November 2026

Appearances and goals by club, season and competition
Club	Season	League			National cup (Note: Includes Danish Cup)		League cup		Europe		Total	
Club	Season	Division	Apps	Goals	Apps	Goals	Apps	Goals	Apps	Goals	Apps	Goals
Nordsjælland	2024–25	Danish Superliga	17	2	1	0	—		—		18	2
Nordsjælland	2025–26	Danish Superliga	30	2	4	0	—		—		34	2
Nordsjælland	2026–27	Danish Superliga	2	0	—		—		2 (Note: Appearances in UEFA Conference League)	0	4	0
Nordsjælland	Total		49	4	5	0	—		2	0	56	4
Coventry City	2026–27	Premier League	10	0	0	0	2	0	—		12	0
Career total			59	4	5	0	2	0	2	0	68	4

=== International ===
As of match played 3 July 2026

Appearances and goals by national team and year
National team	Year	Apps	Goals
Ghana	2025	8	0
Ghana	2026	7	2
Total		15	2

Scores and results list Ghana's goal tally first, score column indicates score after each Yirenkyi goal.

List of international goals scored by Caleb Yirenkyi
No.	Date	Venue	Opponent	Score	Result	Competition
1	2 June 2026	Cardiff City Stadium, Cardiff, Wales	Wales	1–0	1–1	Friendly
2	17 June 2026	BMO Field, Toronto, Canada	Panama	1–0	1–0	2026 FIFA World Cup

== Honours ==
Individual

- Danish Superliga Young Player of the Year 2025–26
- Danish Superliga Young Player of the Month: August 2025, February 2026
- Danish Superliga Team of the Year: 2025–26
