= Tarabina Birewibo =

Nigerian footballer

Tarabina Biweribo
Personal information
- Birth name: Tarabina Biweribo Princewill
- Date of birth: March 11, 2003 (age 23)
- Place of birth: Nigeria
- Positions: Centre-back; left-back

Team information
- Current team: Plateau United

Youth career
- Dynamic Soccer Academy

Senior career*
Years	Team	Apps	(Gls)
2021–2025	Bayelsa United		
2025–	Plateau United	—	(—)

International career
—	Nigeria U-23 (provisional)		
- * Club domestic league appearances and goals

Tarabina Biweribo Princewill (born 11 March 2003) is a Nigerian professional footballer who plays as a defender for Plateau United in the Nigeria Premier Football League (NPFL). He joined Plateau United from Bayelsa United where he spent four seasons on a one-year contract on 1 July 2025. Known for his composure, tactical intelligence, and versatility, he is capable of playing both as a centre-back and a left-back.

== Early life and youth career ==
Princewill was born in Nigeria and began his football career at Dynamic Soccer Academy in Opokuma, Bayelsa State. His performances at youth level drew attention for his defensive awareness and leadership qualities, leading to interest from several Nigerian professional clubs.

== Club career ==
Bayelsa United (2021–2025)

Princewill joined Bayelsa United on 13 June 2021 from Dynamic Soccer Academy. Over four seasons, he became a consistent figure in the team's defence, known for his calmness under pressure and ability to read the game.

During the 2023–24 NPFL season, he was voted Bayelsa United Player of the Season, securing 72 percent of fan votes. He also captained the side in his final season before transferring to Plateau United in August 2025.

Plateau United (2025–present)

In August 2025, Princewill joined Plateau United on a season-long loan from Grassrunner FC. He made an immediate impact, scoring the opening goal in Plateau United's 2–0 victory over defending champions Remo Stars on Matchday 1 of the 2025–26 NPFL season. His performance was praised across major Nigerian sports media outlets for its composure and defensive stability.

Princewill continued to feature prominently for Plateau United throughout the early part of the campaign, helping the team record key wins — including a notable away victory over Remo Stars.

== Style of play ==
Princewill is primarily a centre-back, though he can operate as a left-back. He is known for his positional awareness, clean tackling, aerial strength, and calmness in possession. Coaches have described him as a disciplined and reliable defender with strong leadership qualities and organizational ability.
