= Kristian Lee-Him =

Trinidadian footballer

Personal information
- Full name: Kristian Franklin Lee-Him
- Date of birth: 8 October 1993 (age 33)
- Place of birth: Toronto, Canada
- Height: 1.83 m (6 ft 0 in)
- Position: Midfielder

Team information
- Current team: Syrianska Eskilstuna IF

Youth career
- 2007–2011: Sigma FC

College career
| Years | Team | Apps | (Gls) |
| 2011–2013 | App State Mountaineers | 31 | (5) |
| 2013–2015 | Buffalo Bulls | 34 | (7) |

Senior career*
| Years | Team | Apps | (Gls) |
| 2015–2016 | FC Buffalo | 6 | (1) |
| 2015–2016 | Durham United FC | | |
| 2016–2018 | MNK Izola | 57 | (24) |
| 2018–2019 | Heeslinger SC | 1 | (0) |
| 2019–2020 | Bremer SV | 13 | (3) |
| 2020–2021 | Fagersta Södra IK | 10 | (0) |
| 2021–2022 | Nyköpings BIS | 15 | (3) |
| 2022–2024 | IFK Eskilstuna | 68 | (6) |
| 2024– | Syrianska Eskilstuna IF | 0 | (0) |

International career^{‡}
| 2023– | Trinidad and Tobago | 8 | (1) |
- * Club domestic league appearances and goals as of 17:48, 2 June 2025 (UTC) ‡ National team caps and goals as of 17:48, 2 June 2025 (UTC)

Kristian Franklin Lee-Him (born 8 October 1993) is a Trinidadian professional footballer who plays as a midfielder for Swedish club Syrianska Eskilstuna IF. Born in Canada, he plays for the Trinidad and Tobago national team.

== Club career ==
Lee-Him attended Notre Dame Catholic Secondary School, and began playing club football with Sigma FC. From 2011 to 2013, he played in the college soccer team App State Mountaineers. From 2013 to 2015, he played college soccer with the Buffalo Bulls. After college, he had a short stint with FC Buffalo. He followed that up with a season with League1 Ontario side Durham United FC. In 2016 he moved to Slovenia with MNK Izola to chase his dream of playing football abroad. He followed that up with a stint in Germany with Heeslinger SC and Bremer SV. The COVID-19 pandemic ended leagues in Germany, causing Lee-Him to move to Sweden with Fagersta Södra IK to continue playing in the Division 2. In 2021 he moved to Nyköpings BIS. From 2022 until 2024 he played 3 consecutive seasons with IFK Eskilstuna in the Swedish Division 2. On 20 December 2024, he signed with Syrianska Eskilstuna IF, again in the Swedish fourth division.

== International career ==
Born in Canada, Lee-Him was born to a Trinidadian father and Canadian-Italian mother - he holds Canadian, Trinidadian, and Italian citizenship. He was called up to a training camp for the Trinidad and Tobago U20s in a training camp in February 2011. He debuted with the Trinidad and Tobago national team in a friendly 1–0 win over Guatemala on 1 June 2023. He was part of the national team at the 2025 Unity Cup.
