= Sodiq Ismail =

Nigerian football player

Sodiq Ismail is a Nigerian professional footballer who currently plays for Remo Star as a right back. In May 2024, he received his first call to play for the Super Eagle of Nigeria as part of the George Finidi’s 23-man list for 2026 World Cup qualifiers.
