= Chinemerem Ugwueze =

Nigeria Professional Footballer

Personal information
- Full name: Collins Chinemerem Ugwueze
- Date of birth: May 20, 2001 (age 25)
- Place of birth: Enugu, Nigeria
- Height: 1.80 m (5 ft 11 in)
- Position: Midfielder

Team information
- Current team: Plateau United
- Number: 16

Senior career*
| Years | Team | Apps | (Gls) |
| 2023–2025 | Rangers International | 54 | (4) |
| 2025– | Plateau United | 17 | (0) |

International career^{‡}
| 2025– | Nigeria | 1 | (0) |
- * Club domestic league appearances and goals as of 31 May 2026 ‡ National team caps and goals as of 31 May 2026

Chinemerem Ugwueze is a Nigerian professional footballer who plays as a midfielder for Plateau United in the Nigeria Premier Football League (NPFL).

== Club career ==
Ugwueze began his professional career with Enugu Rangers and made his NPFL debut in 2023 after a transfer from Giant Brillars. In 2024, he was part of the Rangers squad competing for the Nigeria Premier Football League title. He also played in the 2024/25 CAF Champions League where he captained Enugu Rangers.

== International career ==
In May 2025, Ugwueze was invited for the 2026 Unity Cup where he made his debut for Nigeria national team.
