= Waliu Ojetoye =

Nigeria Professional Footballer

Personal information
- Full name: Waliu Ojetoye
- Date of birth: 29 April 2004 (age 22)
- Place of birth: Lagos, Nigeria
- Height: 1.80 m (5 ft 11 in)
- Positions: Right-back; midfielder

Team information
- Current team: MFK Vítkovice
- Number: 5

Senior career*
| Years | Team | Apps | (Gls) |
| 2024–2025 | Ikorodu City | 47 | (0) |
| 2025 | → Hapoel Jerusalem (loan) | 0 | (0) |
| 2026– | Sellier & Bellot Vlašim | 0 | (0) |
| 2026– | MFK Vítkovice | 2 | (0) |
- * Club domestic league appearances and goals as of 10:18, 2 September 2026 (UTC)

Waliu Ojetoye (born 29 April 2004) is a Nigerian professional footballer who plays as a right-back for Czech club MFK Vítkovice.

== Club career ==
Ojetoye began his professional career with Ikorodu City in the Nigeria Premier Football League (NPFL), where he became the captain of the team during the 2024–25 season. In July 2025, he joined Israeli Premier League club Hapoel Jerusalem on a season-long loan deal with an option to buy. In March 2026, Ojetoye completed a move to Czech side Sellier & Bellot Vlašim, his first permanent transfer in European football.

== International career ==
In 2025, Waliu was invited by coach Eric Chelle to represent the Super Eagles of Nigeria team B. In 2025, he was also called up for the Unity Cup where he was on bench against Ghana, but did not make an appearance.
