= Nduka Junior =

Nigerian football player

Personal information
- Full name: Nduka Junior Harrison
- Date of birth: 1 August 2003 (age 23)
- Place of birth: Lagos, Nigeria
- Position: Defender

Team information
- Current team: Delhi

Youth career
- –2021: Remo Stars

Senior career*
Years	Team	Apps	(Gls)
2021–2026	Remo Stars	126	(7)
2026	Erbil SC	0	(0)
2026–	Delhi	3	(0)
- * Club domestic league appearances and goals as of 28 October 2026

Nduka Junior Harrison (born 1 August 2003) is a Nigerian footballer who plays as a central defender for Indian Super League club SC Delhi.

== Career ==
Nduka Junior started representing the Remo Stars at under-17 level. He was appointed vice-captain of the club ahead of the 2019-20 Nigeria National League season behind club captain Saheed Lasisi. Nduka Junior’s first game as captain came in the first game of that season, on 25 November 2019 and he marked it with the only goal of the game in a 1-0 win against Lamray United F.C. Lasisi left the club by mutual consent in September 2020.

A year later, on 26 September 2021 under Nduka Junior’s captaincy Remo Stars gained promotion to the Nigerian Professional Football League. As captain, Nduka Junior has spoken about his desire to keep Remo Stars playing in the Nigerian top flight as the club has suffered from previous relegations. Nduka Junior personally impressed with reports coming that had “shown his quality with some brilliant displays”, and that he had “been a revelation this season. A constant threat from set-pieces”, including scoring a free-kick in a 1-0 win over eventual champions Rivers United.

In September 2022, Nduka Junior played for the first time in the CAF Confederation Cup after qualification was earned from the Remo Stars finishing 3rd in the 2021-22 Nigeria Professional Football League.
