= Benjamin Asare =

Ghanaian footballer (born 1992)

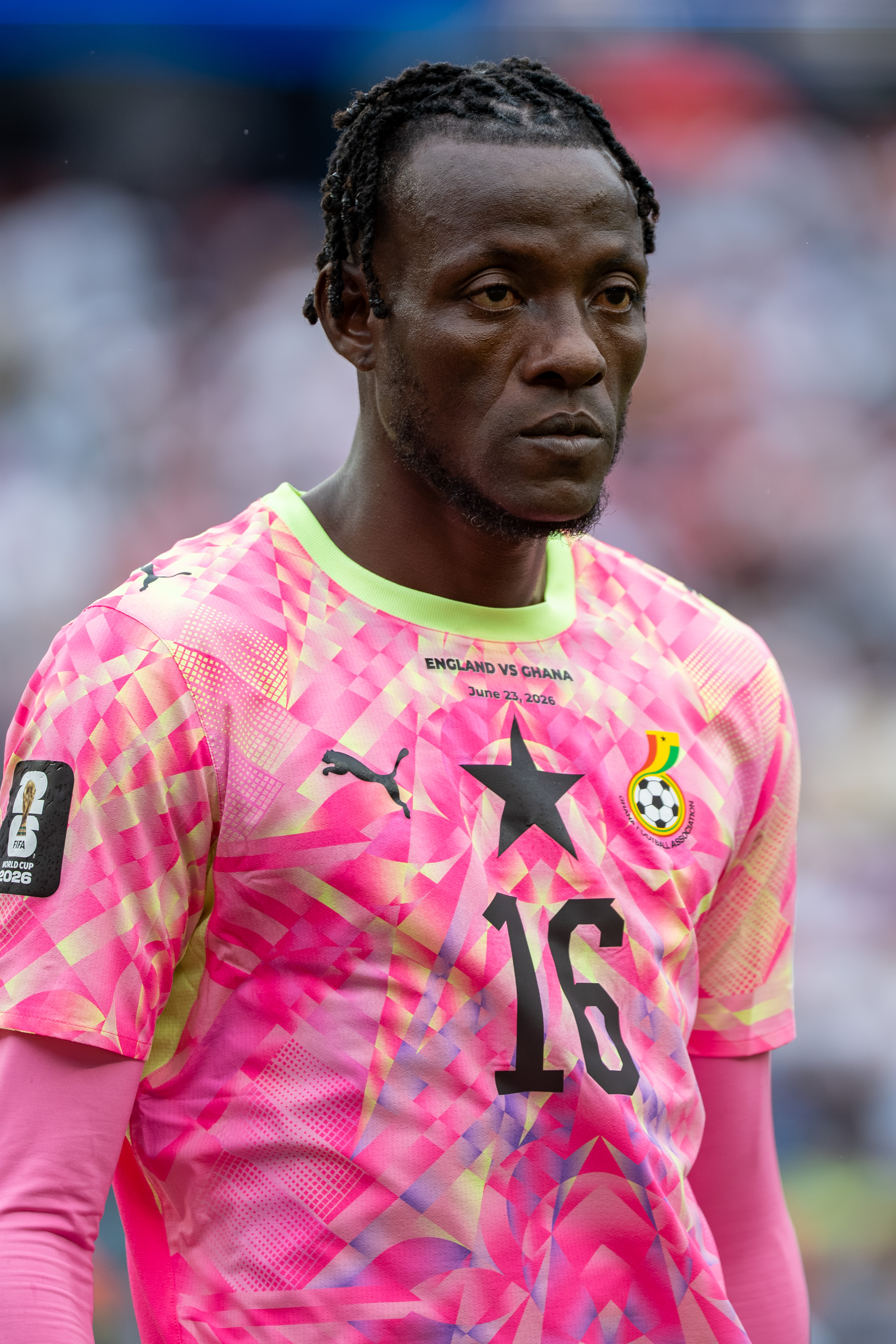
- Asare with Ghana in 2026

Personal information
- Full name: Benjamin Asare
- Date of birth: 13 July 1992 (age 34)
- Place of birth: Mampong-Akuapem, Ghana
- Height: 1.88 m (6 ft 2 in)
- Position: Goalkeeper

Team information
- Current team: Hearts of Oak
- Number: 16

Senior career*
Years	Team	Apps	(Gls)
2017	Sporting Mirren		
2018–2020	Accra City Stars		
2020–2024	Great Olympics	74	(0)
2024–	Hearts of Oak	45	(0)

International career^{‡}
2024–	Ghana	14	(0)
- * Club domestic league appearances and goals ‡ National team caps and goals as of 27 June 2026

Benjamin Asare (born 13 July 1992) is a Ghanaian professional footballer who plays as a goalkeeper for Accra Hearts of Oak in the Ghana Premier League and the Ghana national team.

He rose to prominence in the Ghana Premier League through his performances for Accra Great Olympics before joining Hearts of Oak. In 2025 he earned his first call-up to the Ghana national team during the 2026 FIFA World Cup qualification campaign.

== Club career ==
=== Early career ===
Asare began his professional career in the Division One League with Sporting Mirren in 2017. He later joined Accra City Stars in 2018, where he continued his development as a goalkeeper in Ghanaian domestic football.

=== Accra Great Olympics ===
In 2020, Asare signed for Accra Great Olympics. During his time at the club he established himself as one of the reliable goalkeepers in the Ghana Premier League. His performances for the club attracted attention from larger clubs in the league.

=== Accra Hearts of Oak ===
In July 2024, Asare joined Accra Hearts of Oak, ahead of the 2023–24 season. During the 2024–25 season he emerged as one of the standout goalkeepers in the league, keeping 12 clean sheets in 18 league matches and earning recognition for his performances.

In April 2025, Hearts of Oak extended his contract until 2027, following his impressive performances for both club and country. The following month, he was named Ghana Premier League Goalkeeper of the Month after keeping three clean sheets in five matches. In 2025, Benjamin Asare was named Male Home-Based Footballer of the Year at the 50th Sports Writers Association of Ghana (SWAG) Awards, recognising his standout performances for Accra Hearts of Oak and in the Black Stars setup during the season.

== International career ==
Asare received his first call-up to the Ghana national football team in March 2025 for the 2026 FIFA World Cup qualification matches against Chad and Madagascar.

He made his international debut in a 5–0 victory against Chad, keeping a clean sheet. He also kept another clean sheet in Ghana’s subsequent win against Madagascar during the qualifiers.

On 2 June 2026, Asare was named in head coach Carlos Queiroz's 26-man squad for the 2026 FIFA World Cup.

== Honours ==
Individual

- SWAG Male Home-Based Footballer of the Year: 2025
- Ghana Football Awards Goalkeeper of the Year: 2025
- Ghana Premier League Goalkeeper of the Month: May/June 2025, September 2025
