= Warner Brown =

Jamaican footballer (born 2002)

Personal information
- Full name: Warner Dwayne Brown
- Date of birth: 19 August 2002 (age 24)
- Place of birth: Kingston, Jamaica
- Height: 1.80 m (5 ft 11 in)
- Position: Striker

Team information
- Current team: Arnett Gardens
- Number: 9

Youth career
- St. Andrews Technical

Senior career*
Years	Team	Apps	(Gls)
2021–2023	Tivoli Gardens	15	(5)
2022	→Rochester New York FC (loan)	3	(0)
2023	NŠ Mura	0	(0)
2023	→ND Beltinci (loan)	3	(0)
2023–2025	Arnett Gardens	53	(24)
2025-	Mount Pleasant	0	(0)

International career^{‡}
2025–	Jamaica	10	(4)
- * Club domestic league appearances and goals as of 14:04, 11 June 2025 (UTC) ‡ National team caps and goals as of 23:00, 19 August 2026 (UTC)

Warner Dwayne Brown (born 19 August 2002) is a Jamaican professional footballer who plays as a striker for Jamaica Premier League club Mount Pleasant, and the Jamaica national team.

== Club career ==
A youth product of St. Andrews Technical, Brown began his senior career with Tivoli Gardens in the National Premier League in 2021. In 2022, he moved on loan to the MLS Next Pro club Rochester New York FC. On 22 January 2023, he joined the Slovenian Slovenian PrvaLiga club NŠ Mura on 22 January 2023, on a contract until 2025. He immediately after joined ND Beltinci in the Slovenian Second League to finish the season. In the summer of 2023, he returned to Jamaica with Arnett Gardens. He was the top scorer of the 2024–25 Jamaica Premier League with 22 goals. On July 25, 2025, Warner Brown joined Mount Pleasant.

== International career ==
Brown was first called up to the Jamaica national team for a set of friendlies against Trinidad and Tobago in February 2025. On 10 June 2025, he scored a brace for Jamaica in a 3–0 win over Guatemala in the 2026 FIFA World Cup qualification – CONCACAF second round, helping them advance to the third round of qualification.

== Career statistics ==
=== International ===
As of match played 18 January 2026

Appearances and goals by national team and year
National team	Year	Apps	Goals
Jamaica	2025	9	4
Jamaica	2026	1	0
Total		10	4

Scores and results list Jamaica's goal tally first, score column indicates score after each Brown goal.

List of international goals scored by Warner Brown
No.	Date	Venue	Opponent	Score	Result	Competition
1	7 June 2025	A. O. Shirley Recreation Ground, Road Town, British Virgin Islands	British Virgin Islands	1–0	1–0	2026 FIFA World Cup qualification
2	10 June 2025	Independence Park, Kingston, Jamaica	Guatemala	2–0	3–0	2026 FIFA World Cup qualification
3	10 June 2025	Independence Park, Kingston, Jamaica	Guatemala	3–0	3–0	2026 FIFA World Cup qualification

== Honours ==
Arnett Gardens

- CFU Club Shield: 2024

Mount Pleasant

- CONCACAF Caribbean Cup: 2025

Individual

- 2024–25 Jamaica Premier League Golden Boot (22 goals)
