= Sue-Lae McCalla =

Jamaican footballer (born 1992)

Personal information
- Full name: Sue-Lae Ramon McCalla
- Date of birth: 24 November 1992 (age 33)
- Place of birth: Kingston, Jamaica
- Position: Centre-back

Team information
- Current team: RAEC Mons
- Number: 14

Senior career*
Years	Team	Apps	(Gls)
2012–2018	Portmore United	72	(11)
2016	→ Cavalier (loan)	10	(0)
2018	→ Humble Lions (loan)	2	(0)
2018–2025	Mount Pleasant	166	(20)
2025 – 2026	RAEC Mons	4	(0)
2026 –	Mount Pleasant	3	(0)

International career^{‡}
2023–	Jamaica	6	(1)
- * Club domestic league appearances and goals as of 28 June 2026 ‡ National team caps and goals as of 21 March 2025

Sue-Lae Ramon McCalla (born 24 November 1992) is a Jamaican footballer who plays as a centre-back for Mount Pleasant and the Jamaica national team.

== Club career ==
McCalla spent most of his professional playing career in Jamaica, signing for Portmore United, Cavalier, Humble Lions and Mount Pleasant.

He scored a brace in the 2022–23 Jamaica Premier League finals to secure Mount Pleasant their first ever top flight title.

In September 2025, McCalla was transfer to RAEC Mons in the Belgian third division.

After one year in Belgium, McCalla return to Mount Pleasant

== International career ==
McCalla made his debut for Jamaica in 2023.

== Career statistics ==
As of match played 21 March 2025

Appearances and goals by national team and year
National team	Year	Apps	Goals
Jamaica	2023	1	0
Jamaica	2024	2	0
Jamaica	2025	3	1
Total		6	1

Jamaica score listed first, score column indicates score after each McCalla goal

List of international goals scored by Sue-Lae McCalla
No.	Date	Venue	Opponent	Score	Result	Competition
1	6 February 2025	Montego Bay Sports Complex, Montego Bay, Jamaica	Trinidad and Tobago	1–0	1–0	Friendly

== Honors ==
Portmore United

- Jamaica Premier League: 2017–18, runner-up 2015–16, 2016–17

Mount Pleasant

- Jamaica Premier League: 2022–23
