= South American nations at the FIFA World Cup =

International football delegations

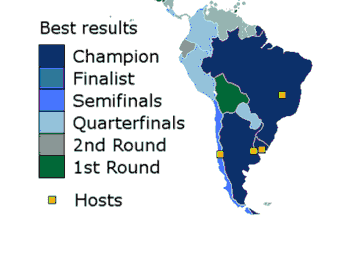
Best performance of South American countries at the FIFA World Cup

Nine of ten members of the South American Football Confederation (CONMEBOL) have competed in the men's FIFA World Cup finals. National association football teams from CONMEBOL have won the tournament ten times, including Brazil's record five championships, Argentina's three and Uruguay's two. CONMEBOL countries have hosted the finals five times.

== Overview ==
	1930 (Uruguay) (13)	1934 (Italy) (16)	1938 (France) (15)	1950 (Brazil) (13)	1954 (Switzerland) (16)	1958 (Sweden) (16)	1962 (Chile) (16)	1966 (England) (16)	1970 (Mexico) (16)	1974 (West Germany) (16)	1978 (Argentina) (16)	1982 (Spain) (24)	1986 (Mexico) (24)	1990 (Italy) (24)	1994 (United States) (24)	1998 (France) (32)	2002 (South Korea) (Japan) (32)	2006 (Germany) (32)	2010 (South Africa) (32)	2014 (Brazil) (32)	2018 (Russia) (32)	2022 (Qatar) (32)	2026 (Canada) (Mexico) (United States) (48)	2030 (Morocco) (Portugal) (Spain) (48)	2034 (Saudi Arabia) (48)	Total
Teams	(Brazil) (Argentina) (Uruguay) (Chile) (Paraguay) (Peru) (Bolivia)	(Brazil) (Argentina)	(Brazil)	(Brazil) (Uruguay) (Chile) (Paraguay) (Bolivia)	(Brazil) (Uruguay)	(Brazil) (Argentina) (Paraguay)	(Brazil) (Argentina) (Uruguay) (Chile) (Colombia)	(Brazil) (Argentina) (Uruguay) (Chile)	(Brazil) (Uruguay) (Peru)	(Brazil) (Argentina) (Uruguay) (Chile)	(Brazil) (Argentina) (Peru)	(Brazil) (Argentina) (Chile) (Peru)	(Brazil) (Argentina) (Uruguay) (Paraguay)	(Brazil) (Argentina) (Uruguay) (Colombia)	(Brazil) (Argentina) (Colombia) (Bolivia)	(Brazil) (Argentina) (Chile) (Paraguay) (Colombia)	(Brazil) (Argentina) (Uruguay) (Paraguay) (Ecuador)	(Brazil) (Argentina) (Paraguay) (Ecuador)	(Brazil) (Argentina) (Uruguay) (Chile) (Paraguay)	(Brazil) (Argentina) (Uruguay) (Chile) (Colombia) (Ecuador)	(Brazil) (Argentina) (Uruguay) (Colombia) (Peru)	(Brazil) (Argentina) (Uruguay) (Ecuador)	(Brazil) (Argentina) (Uruguay) (Paraguay) (Colombia) (Ecuador)	(Argentina) (Uruguay) (Paraguay)		92
Top 32	—	—	—	—	—	—	—	—	—	—	—	—	—	—	—	—	—	—	—	—	—	—	5			5
Top 16	—	—	—	—	—	—	—	—	—	—	—	2 (Note: In 1982, the second round featured 12 teams of which 4 advanced to the semi-finals.)	4	4	2	4	2	3	5	5	4	2	4			41
Top 8	—	0	1	—	2	1	2	2	3	2	3	2	2	1	1	2	1	2	4	3	2	2	1			37
Top 4	2	0	1	2	1	1	2	0	2	1	2	0	1	1	1	1	1	0	1	2	0	1	1			24
Top 2	2	0	0	2	0	1	1	0	1	0	1	0	1	1	1	1	1	0	0	1	0	1	1			16
1st	(Uruguay)			(Uruguay)		(Brazil)	(Brazil)		(Brazil)		(Argentina)		(Argentina)		(Brazil)		(Brazil)					(Argentina)				10
2nd	(Argentina)			(Brazil)										(Argentina)		(Brazil)				(Argentina)			(Argentina)			6
3rd			(Brazil)				(Chile)				(Brazil)															3
4th					(Uruguay)				(Uruguay)	(Brazil)									(Uruguay)	(Brazil)						5

Team	No.	Years	Best result
Brazil	23	1930, 1934, 1938, 1950, 1954, 1958, 1962, 1966, 1970, 1974, 1978, 1982, 1986, 1990, 1994, 1998, 2002, 2006, 2010, 2014, 2018, 2022, 2026	1st
Argentina	19	1930, 1934, 1958, 1962, 1966, 1974, 1978, 1982, 1986, 1990, 1994, 1998, 2002, 2006, 2010, 2014, 2018, 2022, 2026	1st
Uruguay	15	1930, 1950, 1954, 1962, 1966, 1970, 1974, 1986, 1990, 2002, 2010, 2014, 2018, 2022, 2026	1st
Chile	9	1930, 1950, 1962, 1966, 1974, 1982, 1998, 2010, 2014	3rd
Paraguay	9	1930, 1950, 1958, 1986, 1998, 2002, 2006, 2010, 2026	QF
Colombia	7	1962, 1990, 1994, 1998, 2014, 2018, 2026	QF
Ecuador	5	2002, 2006, 2014, 2022, 2026	R16
Peru	5	1930, 1970, 1978, 1982, 2018	QF
Bolivia	3	1930, 1950, 1994	GS

== Results ==
=== Tournament standings ===
Team	Champions	Final	Semi-finals	Quarter-finals (Note: Knockout round of 8: 1934–1938, 1954–1970, and 1986–present; second group stage, top 8: 1974–1978)	Round of 16 (Note: Second group stage, top 12: 1982; knockout round of 16: 1986–present)	Round of 32 (Note: Knockout round of 32: 2026–present)
Brazil	5	7 (Note: Technically, the 1950 FIFA World Cup had its final round in a group of 4, without a final match per se.)	11 (Note: Technically, the 1950 FIFA World Cup had its semi-final round in a group of 4, without a semi-final match per se.)	16	12	1
Argentina	3	7	7	11	11	1
Uruguay	2	2	5	5	5	0
Chile	0	0	1	1	3	0
Peru	0	0	0	2	0	0
Paraguay	0	0	0	1	5	1
Colombia	0	0	0	1	4	1
Ecuador	0	0	0	0	1	1

=== Team results by tournament ===
The team ranking in each tournament is according to FIFA. The rankings, apart from the top four positions (top two in 1930), are not a result of direct competition between the teams; instead, teams eliminated in the same round are ranked by their full results in the tournament.

For each tournament, the number of teams in each finals tournament (in brackets) are shown.

FIFA World Cup results of CONMEBOL members
Team	1930 (Uruguay) (13)	1934 (Italy) (16)	1938 (France) (15)	1950 (Brazil) (13)	1954 (Switzerland) (16)	1958 (Sweden) (16)	1962 (Chile) (16)	1966 (England) (16)	1970 (Mexico) (16)	1974 (West Germany) (16)	1978 (Argentina) (16)	1982 (Spain) (24)	1986 (Mexico) (24)	1990 (Italy) (24)	1994 (United States) (24)	1998 (France) (32)	2002 (South Korea) (Japan) (32)	2006 (Germany) (32)	2010 (South Africa) (32)	2014 (Brazil) (32)	2018 (Russia) (32)	2022 (Qatar) (32)	2026 (Canada) (Mexico) (United States) (48)	2030 (Morocco) (Portugal) (Spain) (48)	2034 (Saudi Arabia) (48)	Total	Qual. Comp.
Argentina	2nd	R16; 9th	×	×		GS; 13th	GS; 10th	QF; 5th	•	GS2; 8th	1st	GS2; 11th	1st	2nd	R16; 10th	QF; 6th	GS; 18th	QF; 6th	QF; 5th	2nd	R16; 16th	1st	2nd	Q	TBD	19	20
Bolivia	GS; 12th			GS; 13th	×	•	•	•	•	•	•	•	•	•	GS; 21st	•	•	•	•	•	•	•	•	TBD	TBD	3	21
Brazil	GS; 6th	R16; 14th	3rd	2nd	QF; 5th	1st	1st	GS; 11th	1st	4th	3rd	GS2; 5th	QF; 5th	R16; 9th	1st	2nd	1st	QF; 5th	QF; 6th	4th	QF; 6th	QF; 7th	R16; 11th	TBD	TBD	23	23
Chile	GS; 5th	×		GS; 9th	•	•	3rd	GS; 13th	•	GS1; 11th	•	GS1; 22nd	•	•	×	R16; 16th	•	•	R16; 10th	R16; 9th	•	•	•	TBD	TBD	9	20
Colombia	—N/a		×			•	GS; 14th	•	•	•	•	•	•	R16; 14th	GS; 19th	GS; 21st	•	•	•	QF; 5th	R16; 9th	•	R16; 10th	TBD	TBD	7	18
Ecuador				×			•	•	•	•	•	•	•	•	•	•	GS; 24th	R16; 12th	•	GS; 17th	•	GS; 18th	R32; T-25th	TBD	TBD	5	17
Paraguay	GS; 9th			GS; 11th	•	GS; 12th	•	•	•	•	•	•	R16; 13th	•	•	R16; 14th	R16; 16th	GS; 18th	QF; 8th	•	•	•	R16; 16th	Q	TBD	9	21
Peru	GS; 10th		×	×	×	•	•	•	QF; 7th	•	GS2; 8th	GS1; 20th	•	•	•	•	•	•	•	•	GS; 20th	•	•	TBD	TBD	5	19
Uruguay	1st			1st	4th	•	GS; 12th	QF; 7th	4th	GS1; 13th	•	•	R16; 16th	R16; 16th	•	•	GS; 26th	•	4th	R16; 12th	QF; 5th	GS; 20th	GS; 37th	Q	TBD	15	21

Legend

1st	Champions
2nd	Runners-up
3rd	Third place
4th	Fourth place
QF	Quarter-finals (1934–1938, 1954–1970, 1986–present)
R16	Knockout round of 16 (1934–1938, 1986–present)
R32	Knockout round of 32 (2026–present)
GS	Group stage (1930, 1950–1970, 1986–present)
GS1	First group stage (1974–1982)
GS2	Second group stage (1974–1982)

Q	Qualified for upcoming tournament
TBD	To be determined (may still qualify for upcoming tournament)
••	Qualified but withdrew
•	Did not qualify
•×	Withdrew or disqualified during qualification (after playing matches)
×	Withdrew before qualification / Banned / Entry not accepted by FIFA
	Hosts
	Did not enter
—N/a	Not a FIFA member

=== Overall team records ===
As per statistical convention in football, matches decided in extra time are counted as wins and losses, while matches decided by penalty shoot-outs are counted as draws. 3 points per win, 1 point per draw and 0 points per loss.

As of 2026 FIFA World Cup

Team	Part	Pld	W	D	L	GF	GA	GD	Pts
Brazil	23	119	79	20	20	247	112	+135	257
Argentina	19	96	54	17	25	171	109	+62	179
Uruguay	15	62	25	15	22	92	80	+12	90
Colombia	7	27	12	5	10	37	31	+6	41
Chile	9	33	11	7	15	40	49	−9	40
Paraguay	9	32	8	12	12	33	44	−11	36
Ecuador	5	17	6	3	8	16	18	−2	21
Peru	5	18	5	3	10	21	33	−12	18
Bolivia	3	6	0	1	5	1	20	−19	1

== Appearances ==
=== Ranking of teams by number of appearances ===
Team	Appearances	Record streak	Active streak	Debut	Most recent	Best result (* hosts)
Brazil	23	23	23	1930	2026	Champions (1958, 1962, 1970, 1994, 2002)
Argentina	19	14	14	1930	2026	Champions (1978*, 1986, 2022)
Uruguay	15	5	5	1930	2026	Champions (1930*, 1950)
Paraguay	9	4	1	1930	2026	Quarter-finals (2010)
Chile	9	2	0	1930	2014	Third place (1962*)
Colombia	7	3	1	1962	2026	Quarter-finals (2014)
Ecuador	5	2	2	2002	2026	Round of 16 (2006)
Peru	5	2	0	1930	2018	Quarter-finals (1970, 1978)
Bolivia	3	1	0	1930	1994	Group stage

=== Team debuts ===
Year	Debutants	Total
1930	Argentina, Brazil, Bolivia, Chile, Paraguay, Peru, Uruguay	7
1962	Colombia	1
2002	Ecuador	1
Total		9

=== Not qualified ===
Venezuela is the only one of the ten active FIFA and CONMEBOL members that have never qualified for the final tournament.

Country	Number of qualifying attempts	1930 (Uruguay)	1934 (Italy)	1938 (France)	1950 (Brazil)	1954 (Switzerland)	1958 (Sweden)	1962 (Chile)	1966 (England)	1970 (Mexico)	1974 (West Germany)	1978 (Argentina)	1982 (Spain)	1986 (Mexico)	1990 (Italy)	1994 (United States)	1998 (France)	2002 (South Korea) (Japan)	2006 (Germany)	2010 (South Africa)	2014 (Brazil)	2018 (Russia)	2022 (Qatar)	2026 (Canada) (Mexico) (United States)	2030 (Morocco) (Portugal) (Spain)	2034 (Saudi Arabia)
Venezuela	15	—N/a					×		•	•	×	•	•	•	•	•	•	•	•	•	•	•	•	•	TBD	TBD

Legend

TBD	To be determined (may still qualify for upcoming tournament)
•	Did not qualify
×	Withdrew before qualification / Banned / Entry not accepted by FIFA
	Did not enter
—N/a	Not a FIFA member

== Summary of performance ==
For each World Cup, the number of countries in the finals (No.), the number of entries from around the world including any rejections and withdrawals (E), the number of South American entries (SA), how many of those South American entries withdrew before or during qualification or were rejected by FIFA (W), the South American representatives at the World Cup finals, the number of World Cup qualifiers each South American representative had played to get to the finals (WCQ), the furthest stage they reached, their results, and their coaches.

Year	Hosts	No.	E	SA	W	Finalists	WCQ	Stage	Results	Coach
1930	Uruguay	13	13	7	0	Argentina	0	Runners-up	won 1–0 France, won 6–3 Mexico, won 3–1 Chile; SF: won 6–1 United States; F: lost 2–4 Uruguay	(Argentina) Francisco Olazar / Juan José Tramutola
1930	Uruguay	13	13	7	0	Bolivia	0	Group stage	lost 0–4 Yugoslavia, lost 0–4 Brazil	(Bolivia) Ulises Saucedo
1930	Uruguay	13	13	7	0	Brazil	0	Group stage	lost 1–2 Yugoslavia, won 4–0 Bolivia	(Brazil) Píndaro
1930	Uruguay	13	13	7	0	Chile	0	Group stage	won 3–0 Mexico, won 1–0 France, lost 1–3 Argentina	(Hungary) György Orth
1930	Uruguay	13	13	7	0	Paraguay	0	Group stage	lost 0–3 United States, won 1–0 Belgium	(Argentina) José Durand Laguna
1930	Uruguay	13	13	7	0	Peru	0	Group stage	lost 1–3 Romania, lost 0–1 Uruguay	(Spain) Francisco Bru
1930	Uruguay	13	13	7	0	Uruguay	0	Champions	won 1–0 Peru, won 4–0 Romania; SF: won 6–1 Yugoslavia; F: won 4–2 Argentina	(Uruguay) Alberto Suppici
1934	Italy	16	32	4	2 (Note: Uruguay refused to participate and defend their title because host Italy had snubbed their tournament in 1930. Peru and Chile withdrew from the qualification.)	Argentina	0	Round of 16	lost 2–3 Sweden	(Italy) Felipe Pascucci
1934	Italy	16	32	4	2	Brazil	0	Round of 16	lost 1–3 Spain	(Brazil) Luiz Vinhaes
1938	France	15	37	3	2 (Note: It was originally intended that the World Cup would be held alternately between the continents of South America and Europe. However Jules Rimet, the creator of the World Cup, convinced FIFA to hold the competition in France, his home country. Because of this controversy, many American countries, including Argentina (the most likely hosts if the event was held in South America), Colombia, Costa Rica, El Salvador, Mexico, Dutch Guiana, Uruguay, and the United States all withdrew or refused to enter.)	Brazil	0	Third place	won 6–5 (a.e.t.) Poland; QF: won 1–1 (a.e.t.) replay match 2–1 Czechoslovakia; SF: lost 1–2 Italy; 3rd: won 4–2 Sweden	(Brazil) Adhemar Pimenta
1950	Brazil	13	34	8	3 (Note: Argentina, Ecuador and Peru withdrew after the qualifying draw (in Argentina's case because of a dispute with the Brazilian Football Association). This meant that Chile, Bolivia, Paraguay and Uruguay qualified from South America by default.)	Bolivia	0	First round	lost 0–8 Uruguay	(Italy) Mario Pretto
1950	Brazil	13	34	8	3	Brazil	0	Runners-up	won 4–0 Mexico, drew 2–2 Switzerland, won 2–0 Yugoslavia; FR: won 7–1 Sweden, won 6–1 Spain, lost 1–2 Uruguay	(Brazil) Flávio Costa
1950	Brazil	13	34	8	3	Chile	0	First round	lost 0–2 England, lost 0–2 Spain, won 5–2 United States	(Chile) Arturo Bucciardi
1950	Brazil	13	34	8	3	Paraguay	0	First round	drew 2–2 Sweden, lost 0–2 Italy	(Paraguay) Manuel Fleitas Solich
1950	Brazil	13	34	8	3	Uruguay	0	Champions	won 8–0 Bolivia; FR: drew 2–2 Spain, won 3–2 Sweden, won 2–1 Brazil	(Uruguay) Juan López
1954	Switzerland	16	37	5	1 (Note: Peru withdrew from the qualification.)	Brazil	4	Quarter-finals	won 5–0 Mexico, drew 1–1 (a.e.t.) Yugoslavia; QF: lost 2–4 Hungary	(Brazil) Zezé Moreira
1954	Switzerland	16	37	5	1	Uruguay	0	Fourth place	won 2–0 Czechoslovakia, won 7–0 Scotland; QF: won 4–2 England; SF: lost 2–4 (a.e.t.) Hungary; 3rd: lost 1–3 Austria	(Uruguay) Juan López
1958	Sweden	16	55	9	1 (Note: Venezuela withdrew from the qualification.)	Argentina	4	Group stage	lost 1–3 West Germany, won 3–1 Northern Ireland, lost 1–6 Czechoslovakia	(Argentina) Guillermo Stábile
1958	Sweden	16	55	9	1	Brazil	2	Champions	won 3–0 Austria, drew 0–0 England, won 2–0 Soviet Union; QF: won 1–0 Wales; SF: won 5–2 France; F: won 5–2 Sweden	(Brazil) Vicente Feola
1958	Sweden	16	55	9	1	Paraguay	4	Group stage	lost 3–7 France, won 3–2 Scotland, drew 3–3 Yugoslavia	(Paraguay) Aurelio González
1962	Chile	16	56	7	0	Argentina	2	Group stage	won 1–0 Bulgaria, lost 1–3 England, drew 0–0 Hungary	(Argentina) Juan Carlos Lorenzo
1962	Chile	16	56	7	0	Brazil	0	Champions	won 2–0 Mexico, drew 0–0 Czechoslovakia, won 2–1 Spain; QF: won 3–1 England; SF: won 4–2 Chile; F: won 3–1 Czechoslovakia	(Brazil) Aymoré Moreira
1962	Chile	16	56	7	0	Chile	0	Third place	won 3–1 Switzerland, won 2–0 Italy, lost 0–2 West Germany; QF: won 2–1 Soviet Union, SF: lost 2–4 Brazil, 3rd: won 1–0 Yugoslavia	(Chile) Fernando Riera
1962	Chile	16	56	7	0	Colombia	2	Group stage	lost 1–2 Uruguay, drew 4–4 Soviet Union, lost 0–5 Yugoslavia	(Argentina) Adolfo Pedernera
1962	Chile	16	56	7	0	Uruguay	2	Group stage	won 2–1 Colombia, lost 1–3 Yugoslavia, lost 1–2 Soviet Union	(Uruguay) Juan Carlos Corazzo
1966	England	16	74	10	0	Argentina	4	Quarter-finals	won 2–1 Spain, drew 0–0 West Germany, won 2–0 Switzerland; QF: lost 0–1 England	(Argentina) Juan Carlos Lorenzo
1966	England	16	74	10	0	Brazil	0	Group stage	won 2–0 Bulgaria, lost 1–3 Hungary, lost 1–3 Portugal	(Brazil) Vicente Feola
1966	England	16	74	10	0	Chile	5	Group stage	lost 0–2 Italy, drew 1–1 North Korea, lost 1–2 Soviet Union	(Chile) Luis Alamos
1966	England	16	74	10	0	Uruguay	4	Quarter-finals	drew 0–0 England, won 2–1 France, drew 0–0 Mexico; QF: lost 0–4 West Germany	(Uruguay) Ondino Viera
1970	Mexico	16	75	10	0	Brazil	6	Champions	won 4–1 Czechoslovakia, won 1–0 England, won 3–2 Romania; QF: won 4–2 Peru, SF: won 3–1 Uruguay; F: won 4–1 Italy	(Brazil) Mário Zagallo
1970	Mexico	16	75	10	0	Peru	4	Quarter-finals	won 3–2 Bulgaria, won 3–0 Morocco, lost 1–3 West Germany; QF: lost 2–4 Brazil	(Brazil) Didi
1970	Mexico	16	75	10	0	Uruguay	4	Fourth place	won 2–0 Israel, drew 0–0 Italy, lost 0–1 Sweden; QF: won 1–0 (a.e.t.) Soviet Union, SF: lost 2–4 Brazil; 3rd: lost 0–1 West Germany	(Uruguay) Juan Hohberg
1974	West Germany	16	99	10	1	Argentina	4	Second round	lost 2–3 Poland, drew 1–1 Italy, won 4–1 Haiti; R2: lost 0–4 Netherlands, lost 1–2 Brazil, drew 1–1 East Germany	(Argentina) Vladislao Cap
1974	West Germany	16	99	10	1	Brazil	0	Fourth place	drew 0–0 Yugoslavia, drew 0–0 Scotland, won 3–0 Zaire; R2: won 1–0 East Germany, won 2–1 Argentina, lost 0–2 Netherlands; 3rd: lost 0–1 Poland	(Brazil) Mário Zagallo
1974	West Germany	16	99	10	1	Chile	4	First round	lost 0–1 West Germany, drew 1–1 East Germany, drew 0–0 Australia	(Chile) Luis Alamos
1974	West Germany	16	99	10	1	Uruguay	4	First round	lost 0–2 Netherlands, drew 1–1 Bulgaria, lost 0–3 Sweden	(Uruguay) Roberto Porta
1978	Argentina	16	107	10	0	Argentina	0	Champions	won 2–1 Hungary, won 2–1 France, lost 0–1 Italy; R2: won 2–0 Poland, drew 0–0 Brazil, won 6–0 Peru; F: won 3–1 (a.e.t.) Netherlands	(Argentina) César Luis Menotti
1978	Argentina	16	107	10	0	Brazil	6	Third place	drew 1–1 Sweden, drew 0–0 Spain, won 1–0 Austria; R2: won 3–0 Peru, drew 0–0 Argentina, won 3–1 Poland; 3rd: won 2–1 Italy	(Brazil) Cláudio Coutinho
1978	Argentina	16	107	10	0	Peru	6	Second round	won 3–1 Scotland, drew 0–0 Netherlands, won 4–1 Iran; R2: lost 0–3 Brazil, lost 0–1 Poland, lost 0–6 Argentina	(Peru) Marcos Calderón
1982	Spain	24	109	10	0	Argentina	0	Second round	lost 0–1 Belgium, won 4–1 Hungary, won 2–0 El Salvador; R2: lost 1–2 Italy, lost 1–3 Brazil	(Argentina) César Luis Menotti
1982	Spain	24	109	10	0	Brazil	4	Second round	won 2–1 Soviet Union, won 4–1 Scotland, won 4–0 New Zealand; R2: won 3–1 Argentina, lost 2–3 Italy	(Brazil) Telê Santana
1982	Spain	24	109	10	0	Chile	4	First round	lost 0–1 Austria, lost 1–4 West Germany, lost 2–3 Algeria	(Chile) Luis Santibáñez
1982	Spain	24	109	10	0	Peru	4	First round	drew 0–0 Cameroon, drew 1–1 Italy, lost 1–5 Poland	(Brazil) Tim
1986	Mexico	24	121	10	0	Argentina	6	Champions	won 3–1 South Korea, drew 1–1 Italy, won 2–0 Bulgaria; R16: won 1–0 Uruguay; QF: won 2–1 England; SF: won 2–0 Belgium; F: won 3–2 West Germany	(Argentina) Carlos Bilardo
1986	Mexico	24	121	10	0	Brazil	4	Quarter-finals	won 1–0 Spain, won 1–0 Algeria, won 3–0 Northern Ireland; R16: won 4–0 Poland, QF: lost 1–1 (3–4 p) France	(Brazil) Telê Santana
1986	Mexico	24	121	10	0	Paraguay	8	Round of 16	won 1–0 Iraq, drew 1–1 Mexico, drew 2–2 Belgium; R16: lost 0–3 England	(Paraguay) Cayetano Ré
1986	Mexico	24	121	10	0	Uruguay	4	Round of 16	drew 1–1 West Germany, lost 1–6 Denmark, drew 0–0 Scotland; R16: lost 0–1 Argentina	(Uruguay) Omar Borrás
1990	Italy	24	116	10	0	Argentina	0	Runners-up	lost 0–1 Cameroon, won 2–0 Soviet Union, drew 1–1 Romania; R16: won 1–0 Brazil; QF: won 0–0 (3–2 p) Yugoslavia; SF: won 1–1 (3–2 p) Italy; F: lost 0–1 West Germany	(Argentina) Carlos Bilardo
1990	Italy	24	116	10	0	Brazil	4	Round of 16	won 2–1 Sweden, won 1–0 Costa Rica, won 1–0 Scotland; R16: lost 0–1 Argentina	(Brazil) Sebastião Lazaroni
1990	Italy	24	116	10	0	Colombia	6	Round of 16	won 2–0 United Arab Emirates, lost 0–1 Yugoslavia, drew 1–1 West Germany; R16: lost 1–2 (a.e.t.) Cameroon	(Colombia) Francisco Maturana
1990	Italy	24	116	10	0	Uruguay	4	Round of 16	drew 0–0 Spain, lost 1–3 Belgium, won 1–0 South Korea; R16: lost 0–2 Italy	(Uruguay) Óscar Tabárez
1994	United States	24	147	9	1 (Note: Chile was banned by FIFA. The reason occurred on 3 September 1989 during a 1990 FIFA World Cup qualifying match at Rio de Janeiro's Maracanã stadium, when Brazil led Chile 1–0. A defeat for Chile would eliminate them from the tournament. Around the 67-minute mark, Chilean goalkeeper Roberto "Cóndor" Rojas fell to the pitch with an apparent injury to his forehead. A firework, thrown from the stands by a Brazilian fan named Rosenery Mello, was smouldering about a yard away. After carrying Rojas off the pitch, the Chilean players and coaches refused to return claiming conditions were not safe. The match went unfinished. After studying video footage of the match showing that the firework had not made contact with Rojas, FIFA awarded Brazil a 2–0 win (eliminating Chile from the 1990 World Cup). The team was banned from the qualifiers of the 1994 Football World Cup, and Rojas was banned for life, although an amnesty was granted in 2001.)	Argentina	8	Round of 16	won 4–0 Greece, won 2–1 Nigeria, lost 0–2 Bulgaria; R16: lost 2–3 Romania	(Argentina) Alfio Basile
1994	United States	24	147	9	1	Bolivia	8	Group stage	lost 0–1 Germany, drew 0–0 South Korea, lost 1–3 Spain	(Spain) Xabier Azkargorta
1994	United States	24	147	9	1	Brazil	8	Champions	won 2–0 Russia, won 3–0 Cameroon, drew 1–1 Sweden; R16: won 1–0 United States; QF: won 3–2 Netherlands; SF: won 1–0 Sweden; F: won 0–0 (3–2 p) Italy	(Brazil) Carlos Alberto Parreira
1994	United States	24	147	9	1	Colombia	6	Group stage	lost 1–3 Romania, lost 1–2 United States, won 2–0 Switzerland	(Colombia) Francisco Maturana
1998	France	32	174	10	0	Argentina	16	Quarter-finals	won 1–0 Japan, won 5–0 Jamaica, won 1–0 Croatia; R16: won 2–2 (4–3 p) England; QF: lost 1–2 Netherlands	(Argentina) Daniel Passarella
1998	France	32	174	10	0	Brazil	0	Runners-up	won 2–1 Scotland, won 3–0 Morocco, lost 1–2 Norway; R16: won 4–1 Chile; QF: won 3–2 Denmark; SF: won 1–1 (4–2 p) Netherlands; F: lost 0–3 France	(Brazil) Mário Zagallo
1998	France	32	174	10	0	Chile	16	Round of 16	drew 2–2 Italy, drew 1–1 Austria, drew 1–1 Cameroon; R16: lost 1–4 Brazil	(Uruguay) (Chile) Nelson Acosta
1998	France	32	174	10	0	Colombia	16	Group stage	lost 0–1 Romania, won 1–0 Tunisia, lost 0–2 England	(Colombia) Hernán Darío Gómez
1998	France	32	174	10	0	Paraguay	16	Round of 16	drew 0–0 Bulgaria, drew 0–0 Spain, won 3–1 Nigeria; R16: lost 0–1 (a.s.d.e.t.) France	(Brazil) Paulo César Carpegiani
2002	South Korea; Japan	32	199	10	0	Argentina	18	Group stage	won 1–0 Nigeria, lost 0–1 England, drew 1–1 Sweden	(Argentina) Marcelo Bielsa
2002	South Korea; Japan	32	199	10	0	Brazil	18	Champions	won 2–1 Turkey, won 4–0 China, won 5–2 Costa Rica; R16: won 2–0 Belgium; QF: won 2–1 England; SF: won 1–0 Turkey; F: won 2–0 Germany	(Brazil) Luiz Felipe Scolari
2002	South Korea; Japan	32	199	10	0	Ecuador	18	Group stage	lost 0–2 Italy, lost 1–2 Mexico, won 1–0 Croatia	(Colombia) Hernán Darío Gómez
2002	South Korea; Japan	32	199	10	0	Paraguay	18	Round of 16	drew 2–2 South Africa, lost 1–3 Spain, won 3–1 Slovenia; R16: lost 0–1 Germany	(Italy) Cesare Maldini
2002	South Korea; Japan	32	199	10	0	Uruguay	20	Group stage	lost 1–2 Denmark, drew 0–0 France, drew 3–3 Senegal	(Uruguay) Víctor Púa
2006	Germany	32	197	10	0	Argentina	18	Quarter-finals	won 2–1 Ivory Coast, won 6–1 Serbia and Montenegro, drew 0–0 Netherlands; R16: won 2–1 (a.e.t.) Mexico; QF: lost 1–1 (2–4 p) Germany	(Argentina) José Pékerman
2006	Germany	32	197	10	0	Brazil	18	Quarter-finals	won 1–0 Croatia, won 2–0 Australia, won 4–1 Japan; R16: won 3–0 Ghana; QF: lost 0–1 France	(Brazil) Carlos Alberto Parreira
2006	Germany	32	197	10	0	Ecuador	18	Round of 16	won 2–0 Poland, won 3–0 Costa Rica, lost 0–3 Germany; R16: lost 0–1 England	(Ecuador) Luis Fernando Suárez
2006	Germany	32	197	10	0	Paraguay	18	Group stage	lost 0–1 England, lost 0–1 Sweden, won 2–0 Trinidad and Tobago	(Uruguay) Aníbal Ruiz
2010	South Africa	32	205	10	0	Argentina	18	Quarter-finals	won 1–0 Nigeria, won 4–1 South Korea, won 2–0 Greece; R16: won 3–1 Mexico; QF: lost 0–4 Germany	(Argentina) Diego Maradona
2010	South Africa	32	205	10	0	Brazil	18	Quarter-finals	won 2–1 North Korea, won 3–1 Ivory Coast, drew 0–0 Portugal; R16: won 3–0 Chile; QF: lost 1–2 Netherlands	(Brazil) Dunga
2010	South Africa	32	205	10	0	Chile	18	Round of 16	won 1–0 Honduras, won 1–0 Switzerland, lost 1–2 Spain; R16: lost 0–3 Brazil	(Argentina) Marcelo Bielsa
2010	South Africa	32	205	10	0	Paraguay	18	Quarter-finals	drew 1–1 Italy, won 2–0 Slovakia, drew 0–0 New Zealand; R16: won 0–0 (5–3 p) Japan; QF: lost 0–1 Spain	(Argentina) Gerardo Martino
2010	South Africa	32	205	10	0	Uruguay	20	Fourth place	drew 0–0 France, won 3–0 South Africa, won 1–0 Mexico; R16: won 2–1 South Korea; QF: won 1–1 (4–2 p) Ghana; SF: lost 2–3 Netherlands; 3rd: lost 2–3 Germany	(Uruguay) Oscar Tabárez
2014	Brazil	32	203	10	0	Argentina	16	Runners-up	won 2–1 Bosnia and Herzegovina, won 1–0 Iran, won 3–2 Nigeria; R16: won 1–0 (a.e.t.) Switzerland; QF: won 1–0 Belgium; SF: won 0–0 (4–2 p) Netherlands; F: lost 0–1 (a.e.t.) Germany	(Argentina) Alejandro Sabella
2014	Brazil	32	203	10	0	Brazil	0	Fourth place	won 3–1 Croatia, drew 0–0 Mexico, won 4–1 Cameroon; R16: won 1–1 (3–2 p) Chile; QF: won 2–1 Colombia; SF: lost 1–7 Germany; 3rd: lost 0–3 Netherlands	(Brazil) Luiz Felipe Scolari
2014	Brazil	32	203	10	0	Chile	16	Round of 16	won 3–1 Australia, won 2–0 Spain, lost 0–2 Netherlands; R16: lost 1–1 (2–3 p) Brazil	(Argentina) Jorge Sampaoli
2014	Brazil	32	203	10	0	Colombia	16	Quarter-finals	won 3–0 Greece, won 2–1 Ivory Coast, won 4–1 Japan; R16: won 2–0 Uruguay; QF: lost 1–2 Brazil	(Argentina) José Pekerman
2014	Brazil	32	203	10	0	Ecuador	16	Group stage	lost 1–2 Switzerland, won 2–1 Honduras, drew 0–0 France	(Colombia) Reinaldo Rueda
2014	Brazil	32	203	10	0	Uruguay	18	Round of 16	lost 1–3 Costa Rica, won 2–1 England, won 1–0 Italy; R16: lost 0–2 Colombia	(Uruguay) Oscar Tabárez
2018	Russia	32	210	10	0	Argentina	18	Round of 16	drew 1–1 Iceland, lost 0–3 Croatia, won 2–1 Nigeria; R16: lost 3–4 France	(Argentina) Jorge Sampaoli
2018	Russia	32	210	10	0	Brazil	18	Quarter-finals	drew 1–1 Switzerland, won 2–0 Costa Rica, won 2–0 Serbia; R16: won 2–0 Mexico; QF: lost 1–2 Belgium	(Brazil) Tite
2018	Russia	32	210	10	0	Colombia	18	Round of 16	lost 1–2 Japan, won 3–0 Poland, won 1–0 Senegal; R16: lost 1–1 (3–4 p) England	(Argentina) José Pekerman
2018	Russia	32	210	10	0	Peru	20	Group stage	lost 0–1 Denmark, lost 0–1 France, won 2–0 Australia	(Argentina) Ricardo Gareca
2018	Russia	32	210	10	0	Uruguay	18	Quarter-finals	won 1–0 Egypt, won 1–0 Saudi Arabia, won 3–0 Russia; R16: won 2–1 Portugal; QF: lost 0–2 France	(Uruguay) Oscar Tabárez
2022	Qatar	32	206	10	0	Argentina	17	Champions	lost 1–2 Saudi Arabia, won 2–0 Mexico, won 2–0 Poland; R16: won 2–1 Australia; QF: won 2–2 (4–3 p) Netherlands; SF: won 3–0 Croatia; F: won 3–3 (4–2 p) France	(Argentina) Lionel Scaloni
2022	Qatar	32	206	10	0	Brazil	17	Quarter-finals	won 2–0 Serbia, won 1–0 Switzerland, lost 0–1 Cameroon; R16: won 4–1 South Korea; QF: lost 1–1 (2–4 p) Croatia	(Brazil) Tite
2022	Qatar	32	206	10	0	Ecuador	18	Group stage	won 2–0 Qatar, drew 1–1 Netherlands, lost 1–2 Senegal	(Argentina) Gustavo Alfaro
2022	Qatar	32	206	10	0	Uruguay	18	Group stage	drew 0–0 South Korea, lost 0–2 Portugal, won 2–0 Ghana	(Uruguay) Diego Alonso
2026	Canada; Mexico; United States	48	208	10	0	Argentina	18	Runners-up	won 3–0 Algeria, won 2–0 Austria, won 3–1 Jordan; R32: won 3–2 (a.e.t.) Cape Verde; R16: won 3–2 Egypt; QF: won 3–1 (a.e.t.) Switzerland; SF: won 2–1 England; F: lost 0–1 (a.e.t.) Spain	(Argentina) Lionel Scaloni
2026	Canada; Mexico; United States	48	208	10	0	Brazil	18	Round of 16	drew 1–1 Morocco, won 3–0 Haiti, won 3–0 Scotland; R32: won 2–1 Japan; R16: lost 1–2 Norway	(Italy) Carlo Ancelotti
2026	Canada; Mexico; United States	48	208	10	0	Colombia	18	Round of 16	won 3–1 Uzbekistan, won 1–0 DR Congo, drew 0–0 Portugal; R32: won 1–0 Ghana; R16: lost 0–0 (3–4 p) Switzerland	(Argentina) Néstor Lorenzo
2026	Canada; Mexico; United States	48	208	10	0	Ecuador	18	Round of 32	lost 0–1 Ivory Coast, drew 0–0 Curaçao, won 2–1 Germany; R32: lost 0–2 Mexico	(Argentina) Sebastián Beccacece
2026	Canada; Mexico; United States	48	208	10	0	Paraguay	18	Round of 16	lost 1–4 United States, won 1–0 Turkey, drew 0–0 Australia; R32: won 1–1 (4–3 p) Germany; R16: lost 0–1 France	(Argentina) Gustavo Alfaro
2026	Canada; Mexico; United States	48	208	10	0	Uruguay	18	Group stage	drew 1–1 Saudi Arabia, drew 2–2 Cape Verde, lost 0–1 Spain	(Argentina) Marcelo Bielsa

== Performance at individual World Cups ==
=== 1930s: The inaugural FIFA World Cup, Uruguay's triumph ===
The 1930 FIFA World Cup was the inaugural FIFA World Cup, the world championship for men's national association football association football teams. It took place in Uruguay from 13 July to 30 July 1930. FIFA, football's international governing body selected Uruguay as host nation as the country would be celebrating the centenary of its first constitution, and Uruguay had successfully retained their football title at the 1928 Summer Olympics. The first World Cup was the only one without a qualification process; seven teams from South America participated in the tournament. Argentina and Uruguay won their groups to get to the semifinal, Chile were runners-up in Argentina's group, Brazil and Paraguay managed one win apiece, and both Peru and Bolivia lost their two games.

The 1930 FIFA World Cup Final was contested by the finalists from the 1928 Olympics, Uruguay and Argentina, both having won their semifinals by 6–1. The final was played at the Estadio Centenario on 30 July. The gates were opened at 8:00, six hours before kick-off, and at noon the ground was full with an official attendance of 93,000. A disagreement overshadowed the build-up to the match as the teams disagreed on who should provide the match ball, forcing FIFA to intervene and decree that the Argentine team would provide the ball for the first half and the Uruguayans would provide their own for the second. The game ended 4–2 to Uruguay (who had trailed 2–1 at half time) who added the title World Cup winners to the mantle of Olympic Champions, as Jules Rimet, president of FIFA, presented the World Cup Trophy, which was later named after him.

=== 1934–1938: World Cup without champions, third place for Brazil ===
The 1934 World Cup is the only tournament in which the reigning champions did not participate. Reigning World Cup holders Uruguay declined to participate in protest at the refusal of several European countries to travel to South America for the 1930 World Cup, which Uruguay had hosted. Argentina and Brazil were the only South Americans nations to participate, and lost right away in the straight knockout tournament, the former to Sweden and the latter to Spain.

The 1938 World Cup was the last one to be staged before the outbreak of World War II. The decision to hold the 1938 tournament in France was controversial, as the American countries had been led to understand that the World Cup would rotate between the two continents. Both Argentina and Uruguay therefore boycotted the tournament. Only Brazil participated from South America, finishing in third place after a 4–2 victory against Sweden.

=== 1950: World Cup in Brazil, Uruguay's second triumph ===
The 1950 World Cup, held in Brazil, was the fourth FIFA World Cup and the only one not decided by a one-match final. Argentina, Ecuador and Peru in South America withdrew after the qualifying draw (in Argentina's case because of a dispute with the Brazilian Football Confederation). This meant that Chile, Bolivia, Paraguay and Uruguay qualified from South America by default. After many pre-tournament withdrawals, the groups were uneven, with four teams in Group A (which Brazil won) and B (Chile were eliminated after only beating the United States), three in Group C (Paraguay drew Sweden and lost to Italy), and D having only Uruguay and Bolivia, with the former managing a large 8–0 victory.

The final group stage involved the teams who had won their groups: Brazil, Spain, Sweden and 1930 champions Uruguay, who were making their first World Cup appearance since winning the inaugural tournament. The World Cup winners would be the team that managed to finish on top of this group. The final group's six matches were shared between Rio de Janeiro and São Paulo. Brazil played all its final group matches at the Estádio do Maracanã in Rio, while the games that didn't involve the host nation were played in São Paulo. Brazil won their first two matches with a 7–1 thrashing of Sweden and 6–1 rout of Spain. Eventually, Brazil progressed to the final round, facing Uruguay in the final match of the tournament on 16 July 1950. Brazil only needed a draw to finish top of the group, but Uruguay won the game 2–1, shocking and silencing the hundred thousands who attended the game. This defeat on home soil is a significant event in Brazilian history, being known popularly as the Maracanazo. The official attendance of the game was 199,854, with the actual attendance estimated to be about 210,000.

=== 1954: Postponed dreams ===
As title holders, Uruguay qualified automatically for the 1954 World Cup. They were joined by Brazil, who won a South American qualifier of only three teams. In the quarter-finals, Brazil lost a violent 2–4 game to Hungary, who proceeded to defeat Uruguay in the semifinal after extra time. Uruguay then obtained fourth place, losing the match for third place 1–3 to Austria.

=== 1958–1962: Brazilian domination, 1962 FIFA World Cup in Chile ===
Three South American nations – Argentina, Paraguay and Brazil – participated in the 1958 World Cup. Argentina appeared for the first time since 1934, while this would be Paraguay's last finals appearance until 1986. Both fell in the group stage, Argentina after a lopsided 1–6 defeat to Czechoslovakia dubbed the "Disaster of Sweden", and Paraguay once they were unable to finish an upset of Yugoslavia that ended in a 3–3 draw. The tournament was won by Brazil, who beat Sweden 5–2 in the final to obtain their first title. To date, this marks the only occasion that a World Cup staged in Europe was not won by a European team. This final also bears many records in World Cup history. Pelé became the youngest player to play at a World Cup finals, the youngest scorer in a World Cup final and the youngest player to win a World Cup winners' medal. The team of the tournament voted by journalists had five Brazil players.

The 1962 World Cup was held in Chile and was the third World Cup held in South America. Five South American nations participated. The tournament was again won by Brazil, who claimed their second title after defeating Czechoslovakia 3–1 in the final, becoming the second team to successfully defend its World title, since Italy achieved the same feat in 1938. Hosts Chile, after losing the semifinal to Brazil, beat Yugoslavia 1–0 to finish the tournament in third place.

=== 1966: Search for the guilty ===
At the 1966 World Cup, four South American nations participated. Defending champions Brazil underwhelmed, winning only their first game and being eliminated in the group stage. Chile also fell early, having only scored one point in a draw with Yugoslavia.

Argentina and Uruguay lost in the quarter-final, the latter in a lopsided 4–0 defeat to West Germany, and the former in a controversial match with hosts England, that sparked the Argentina and England football rivalry and is known as el robo del siglo (the robbery of the century) in Argentina, given the Argentinians claimed the winning goal by Geoff Hurst was offisde, and captain Antonio Rattín was sent off, at first refusing to leave the field, only doing so eventually escorted by several policemen. It is one of the worst championship by results for the South American nations.

South American protesters claimed that England, as hosts, had rigged the entire tournament with the help of West Germany. They particularly complained about the referees. English officials refereed most of Brazil's games. The England–Argentina match was refereed by a German; it was a bad-tempered match and the England manager, Alf Ramsay, described the Argentines afterwards as "animals". Meanwhile, the West Germany–Uruguay match had an English referee who sent off two Uruguayans after a handball by Karl-Heinz Schnellinger was disregarded by the English referee.

=== 1970: The greatest World Cup team ever ===
Three South Americans participated in the 1970 World Cup. Peru qualified for the first time, having made one previous appearance in the 1930 tournament (which did not require qualification). The 1970 World Cup won by Brazil, who beat Italy 4–1 in the final. Along the way they eliminated the other two South Americans, Peru in the quarterfinals and Uruguay in the semifinal. With their third World Cup triumph, Brazil were allowed to keep the Jules Rimet Trophy permanently. In the semi-final, Brazil defeated Uruguay 3–1, finally exacting revenge for their defeat in the 1950 World Cup final. The Brazilian squad, led by Carlos Alberto, and featuring Pelé, Clodoaldo, Gérson, Jairzinho, Rivellino and Tostão, is often regarded as the greatest ever World Cup team.

=== 1974: New conspiracy theory ===
Four nations participated in the 1974 World Cup. For qualification, the nine South American nations were divided into three groups of three teams each, as Brazil qualified automatically as holders; Argentina, Chile, Uruguay also qualified for the tournament (with Chile qualifying due to the refusal of the Soviet team to travel to Chile for the second leg of the playoff due to political reasons). Brazil finished in fourth place, while Argentina was eliminated in the second round, and Chile and Uruguay in the first round. Carlos Caszely of Chile became the first player to be sent off with a red card in a World Cup opening match. João Havelange, president of FIFA from 1974 to 1998, claimed that the 1966 and 1974 World Cups were fixed so that England and Germany would win respectively. He stated, "We were the best in the world, and had the same team that had won the World Cup in 1962 in Chile and 1970 in Mexico, but it was planned for the host countries to win."

=== 1978: The first Argentina World Cup title ===
The 1978 World Cup, the 11th staging of the tournament, was held in Argentina, marking the fourth time the World Cup was hosted in South America. Three South American nations participated in the tournament: Argentina, Brazil and Peru. The tournament was won by Argentina who beat the Netherlands 3–1 after extra time in the final. This win was the first World Cup title for Argentina. Controversy surrounded the hosts, however, as all of their games in the first round kicked off at night, giving the Argentines the advantage of knowing where they stood in the group. This issue would arise again in Spain 1982, which prompted FIFA to change the rules so that the final two group games in subsequent World Cups would be played simultaneously.

In 1978, Argentina needed to beat Copa América holders Peru by four clear goals to reach the final ahead of Brazil. They won 6–0 but there were dark rumours that Peru, who had an Argentine-born goalkeeper, had thrown the game. There are several allegations that the Argentine government struck a deal with the Peruvian government that ensured Argentina would proceed to the final. The deal allegedly encompassed delivery of a large grain shipment to Peru by Argentina and the unfreezing of a Peruvian bank account that was held by the Argentine Central Bank. In exchange, the Peruvian team had to allow Argentina to win in their second-round match with a margin that was large enough to go the next round. That margin was four goals.

The final, Argentina–Netherlands, was also controversial, as the Dutch accused the Argentines of using stalling tactics to delay the match. Mario Kempes opened the scoring for the hosts before Dick Nanninga equalized a few minutes from the end. Rob Rensenbrink had a glorious stoppage-time opportunity to win it for the Netherlands, but his effort came back off the goal post. Argentina won the final 3–1 after extra time. The Netherlands, because of the controversial game events, refused to attend the post-match ceremonies after the match ended. Brazil took third place from an enterprising Italy side with Nelinho scoring a memorable goal, and were dubbed "moral champions" by coach Cláudio Coutinho as although they did not win the tournament, they did not lose a single match.

=== 1982: The "Sarrià Stadium Tragedy" ===
Four South American nations participated in the 1982 World Cup: Argentina, Brazil, Chile and Peru. This was the last time Peru qualified for a FIFA World Cup finals until 2018. The tournament was the first for Diego Maradona, but defending champions Argentina lost the opening match 0–1 to Belgium, although they would qualify to the second round. Brazil, with Zico, Sócrates, Falcão, Éder and others in their squad, boasted an offensive firepower that promised a return to the glory days of 1970. They defeated the Soviet Union 2–1 thanks to a 20-metre Éder goal two minutes from time, then Scotland and New Zealand with four goals each.

Peru and Chile finished fourth in their groups and were therefore eliminated early. In the second round, Italy prevailed 2–1 over Argentina, with Italian defenders Gaetano Scirea and Claudio Gentile proving themselves equal to the task of stopping the Argentine attack. With the loss, Argentina needed a win over Brazil on the second day, but fell 3–1, with Argentina only scoring in the last minute. Notably, Maradona kicked Brazilian player João Batista in the groin and was sent off in the 85th minute. The Brazil–Italy match 3–2 for Italy, with Italian striker Paolo Rossi scoring a hat-trick. The result eliminated Brazil from the tournament. The result was seen by many as not only a defeat for Brazil, but a defeat of their attacking philosophy by the less talented but more organised Italians. This match has since then been labelled by Brazilian press as the 'Sarrià Stadium Tragedy' (br: A tragédia do Sarriá)

=== 1986: Argentina's second World Cup title ===
Colombia had been originally chosen to host the competition by FIFA, but, largely due to economic reasons, was not able to do so and officially resigned in 1982. Mexico was selected as the new host in May 1983. At the 1986 World Cup, four South American nations participated: Argentina, Brazil, Paraguay and Uruguay. The tournament was won by Argentina (their second title, after also winning in 1978), captained by Maradona, who scored the infamous "Hand of God goal", and also a goal voted as "Goal of the Century", in the same quarter-final against England. These were two of the five goals that Maradona scored during the tournament; he also created another five for his teammates. Argentina beat West Germany 3–2 in the final at Mexico City's Estadio Azteca.

The first round of the finals began in Group A, where Argentina beat South Korea 3–1, with Maradona playing a major part. Italy and Argentina drew 1–1, Maradona and Alessandro Altobelli scoring. The final set of matches saw Argentina beating Bulgaria 2–0.

Paraguay in Group B won 1–0 over Iraq and subsequently drew both Mexico and Belgium. Group D saw Brazil start 1–0 over Spain, 1–0 over Algeria, and 3–0 over Northern Ireland. Uruguay qualified in the second round with only two points and a goal difference of –5.

In the rematch of the 1930 World Cup final, Argentina just edged out South American champions Uruguay in Puebla thanks to a 42nd-minute strike from Pedro Pasculli. Brazil progressed to the quarter-finals comfortably when they saw off Poland 4–0, while Paraguay lost to England 0–3.

In the quarter-finals, three-time world champion Brazil faced France in Guadalajara. Brazil were well on top in the early stages, and Careca put them one up after 18 minutes. Five minutes before half-time, however, France drew level when Michel Platini scored his 41st goal after converting a cross from Dominique Rocheteau. Brazil had a chance to regain the lead in the second half when Branco was fouled by French keeper Joël Bats in the penalty area. Zico took the penalty, but Bats saved it. The match proceeded into extra time, and France had the better of the extra half-hour. No goals were scored, and so it was time for a penalty shoot-out. Sócrates, who had earlier missed an open goal and headed an easy chance straight into the French goalkeeper's arms, failed with the first kick for Brazil. The next six penalties were all converted, followed by Platini firing over the bar. Brazil were back on level terms, but not for long: Júlio César struck the post with his penalty, whereupon Luis Fernández then scored to put France through 4–3 on penalties.

The quarter-final between Argentina and England was notable for two very different goals by Diego Maradona: the first was scored illegally, as he punched the ball into the goal past England goalkeeper Peter Shilton. The referee did not see the handball and the goal was given as valid. After the game, Maradona claimed the goal was scored "A bit with the head of Maradona and another bit with the hand of God". For his second goal, voted "Goal of the Century" in 2002 on the FIFA website, Maradona dribbled half the length of the field past five English players before scoring. In Argentina, the game was seen as revenge for the Falklands War.

Moving onto the semi-final, Maradona struck twice in the second half as Argentina beat Belgium 2–0. In the final against West Germany, José Luis Brown put Argentina one up midway through the first half of the final, and when Jorge Valdano scored a second for the South Americans in the 55th minute, Argentina looked to be strolling to victory. West Germany then staged a spirited comeback. Karl-Heinz Rummenigge pulled one back in the 74th minute, and six minutes later Rudi Völler hit the equaliser. With seven minutes remaining, a pass from Maradona gave Jorge Burruchaga the chance to score the winner for Argentina. Eight years on from their home triumph, Argentina regained the world title and 30 million people in Argentina celebrated in the streets after the final victory. Maradona was the Golden Ball winner as the best player of the tournament.

=== 1990: Chile incident, Argentina reaches Final ===
Four South American nations participated in the 1990 World Cup: Argentina, Brazil, Colombia and Uruguay. Qualifying was marked by a bizarre incident, where during the Brazil–Chile match in Rio de Janeiro, with Chile down 0–1 during the second half, Chile goalkeeper Roberto Rojas fell to the pitch with an apparent injury to his forehead, with a firework, thrown from the stands by a Brazilian fan named Rosenery de Mello, smouldering about a yard away. After carrying Rojas off the pitch, the Chilean players and coaches refused to return claiming conditions were not safe, and the match went unfinished. After studying video footage of the match showing that the firework had not made contact with Rojas, FIFA awarded Brazil a 2–0 win, eliminating Chile from the 1990 World Cup. As punishment, Chile were barred from the qualifying process for the 1994 World Cup, and Rojas was banned for life, though the ban was lifted in 2001.

Argentina lost its first game 0–1 to Cameroon, then defeated the Soviet Union 2–0 and drew 1–1 with Romania, finishing third in its group as one of the tournament's best third-placed teams. Brazil took maximum points in its group, winning 2–1 over Sweden, 1–0 over Costa Rica and 1–0 over Scotland. Colombia and Uruguay also qualified to the second round.

The all-South American match in the second round was won for Argentina by a goal from Claudio Caniggia with ten minutes remaining after a run through the Brazilian defence by Diego Maradona and an outstanding performance from goalkeeper Sergio Goycochea. Uruguay lost 0–2 to Italy, while Colombia lost 1–2 after extra time to Cameroon, where the game-winning goal originated in an infamous play where goalkeeper René Higuita lost the ball to Roger Milla in an attempt to dribble the Cameroonian.

Argentina reached the semi-finals after a goalless stalemate and winning the penalty shoot-out 3–2, despite Maradona having his penalty saved. A second Argentine miss (by Pedro Troglio) looked to have eliminated them until goalkeeper Sergio Goycochea – playing because first choice Nery Pumpido broke his leg during the group stage – rescued his side by stopping the Yugoslavs' final two spotkicks.

The first semi-final pitted the host nation Italy against world champions Argentina. Salvatore Schillaci scored to put Italy ahead in the 17th minute, but Claudio Caniggia equalised midway through the second half, There were no further goals, but a series of serious fouls saw five yellow cards and a red issued, largely to Argentina: the game went to a shoot-out which Argentina won 4–3, after Roberto Donadoni and Aldo Serena both had their kicks saved by Goycochea. Argentina's decisive penalty had been converted by Maradona, who, playing in his club "home city" of Naples, had urged locals to support him rather than their homeland, creating a more muted atmosphere than Italy's previous games in Rome.

The final between West Germany and Argentina has been cited as the most cynical and lowest quality of all World Cup finals. In the 65th minute, Argentina's Pedro Monzón was sent off for a foul on Jürgen Klinsmann, the first player ever to be sent off in a World Cup final.

Argentina, weakened by suspension and injury, offered little attacking threat throughout a contest dominated by the West Germans, who struggled to create many clear goalscoring opportunities. The only goal of the contest arrived in the 84th minute when Mexican referee Edgardo Codesal awarded a penalty to West Germany, after a foul on Rudi Völler by Roberto Sensini. Andreas Brehme, who later said there was no foul, converted the spot kick to settle the contest. In the closing moments, Argentina were reduced to nine after Gustavo Dezotti received the second red card of the game when he hauled Jürgen Kohler to the ground during a stoppage in play. The 1–0 scoreline provided another first: Argentina were the first team to fail to score in a World Cup final.

=== 1994: Bolivia returns to the World Cup, Colombian tragedy, Brazil's fourth World Cup title ===
Four South American nations participated in the 1994 World Cup: Argentina, Brazil, Colombia and Bolivia. Chile could not take part in qualification as it was still banned by FIFA; Bolivia qualified for the first time since the 1950 tournament, with victories over both Brazil and Uruguay.

Colombia, despite high expectations due to their style and impressive qualifying campaign, which included a historic 5–0 win over Argentina in Buenos Aires, disappointed in the tournament. After starting the group stage with a 1–3 loss to Romania, the team went into their second group game against hosts United States knowing they had to win to ease their chances of progressing. In the 35th minute, Andrés Escobar attempted to cut out a cross but accidentally deflected the ball into his own net. Earnie Stewart took the Americans two goals in front after scoring in the 56th minute. Iván Valenciano scored a consolation goal for Colombia in the closing minutes of the match. Colombia did, however, win their final group match 2–0 over Switzerland, but it was not enough to ensure progression. The team was supposedly dogged by influence from betting syndicates and drug cartels, with coach Francisco Maturana receiving death threats over squad selection. Escobar wound up shot to death outside a bar in a Medellín suburb only ten days after the match, apparently in retaliation for the own goal.

In Group B, Brazil beat both Russia and Cameroon, and with a draw against Sweden finished atop their group. Group C had Bolivia lost the tournament's opening match to Germany, drew 0–0 against South Korea in their first non-defeat in a World Cup, and were eliminated once defeated by Spain, though Erwin Sánchez scored Bolivia's first and so far only goal in World Cup history. Group D had Argentina winning their first two games after beating Greece 4–0 in Foxboro before coming from behind to overcome the feisty Nigerians 2–1 on the same field four days later. Then with Maradona failing a drug test which uncovered ephedrine, a weight loss drug, in his blood, the captain was suspended for the rest of the tournament, leading Argentina to lose 0–2 Bulgaria and finish third in the group.

In the round of 16 Argentina faced Romania, who had Ilie Dumitrescu score twice in the opening twenty minutes, with Gabriel Batistuta scoring a penalty in-between, but after half-time Romania netted a superb third goal on the counterattack, with Gheorghe Hagi beating goalkeeper Luis Islas. Abel Balbo pulled a goal back, but Romania held on for a shock win. Brazil beat the United States during the host's Independence Day, July 4, on a Bebeto goal, in a game marred by Leonardo sent off for elbowing American defender Tab Ramos.

In the quarter-finals, Brazil won against the Netherlands. For the second Brazilian goal, Romário was clearly offside in the buildup, but as he pretended he had not seen the ball, the referee considered that Romário was not participating in the play, and Bebeto's goal stood. It seemed to be heading towards an easy 2–0 win for Brazil, but in ten minutes Netherlands scored two goals, levelling the match. Branco then scored from a long-range free kick to restore Brazil's lead. Branco, a veteran of the team who had participated in the 1986 and 1990 tournaments, was much admired by the Brazilian fans for his braveness. FIFA considered this Brazil - Netherlands match to be a classic.

Brazil won their semi-final against Sweden 1–0; after Jonas Thern had been sent off for Sweden, Romário scored the only goal of the game in the 80th minute.

Brazil and Italy contested the 1994 FIFA World Cup final. The hot California weather and both teams prioritizing defence led to few scoring chances, and for the first time in the history of the tournament, the final ended in a 0–0, having to be decided by a penalty shoot-out. Brazil won the shoot-out, with the Italians missing three of their four attempts. Brazil was thus the first team to win a fourth world championship. The trophy was handed to captain Dunga by U.S. vice-president Al Gore. Brazil's Romário, with five goals, won the Golden Ball as the tournament's best player. Brazilians refer to this tournament as the cup that Romário won for Brazil.

=== 1998: Brazil too weak in the final ===
At the 1998 FIFA World Cup, five nations of South America participated: Argentina, Brazil, Chile, Colombia and Paraguay, with Paraguay qualifying for the first time since 1986. Following Brazil's wins over Scotland and Morocco, they were confirmed as group winners with a game to spare, which turned out to be a defeat to Norway. Chile conceded equalisers in all of their games, but their three draws were still enough for them to qualify in second place and advance to the knockout stage with a record-low three points. Paraguay drew their first two group games 0–0 and then beat Nigeria 3–1 to advance in second place. After two matchdays in their group, England and Colombia were level on points prior to their final group game against each other. Colombia lost the match 0–2 and were eliminated. Argentina advanced with a match to spare after they beat Japan and Jamaica, with Gabriel Batistuta scoring in both games. Argentina then beat Croatia to take first place in the group.

In the round of 16, Chile played against South American rivals Brazil at the Parc des Princes in Paris. César Sampaio scored twice for Brazil early on, and a Ronaldo penalty made it 3–0 before half-time. Chile kept fighting, and Salas got his fourth goal of the competition, heading in a rebound after Cláudio Taffarel had saved a shot from Zamorano, but Ronaldo then quickly scored a fourth for Brazil as Chile were sent out of the tournament. Argentina's round of 16 match against England remained at 2–2 until the end of extra time. In the ensuing penalty shoot-out that decided the game, Argentina won 4–3 after two English shots were saved by Argentine goalkeeper Carlos Roa. Paraguay lost their second round match to France, with the only goal coming through Laurent Blanc in the 114th minute, during the second half of extra time, the first ever golden goal scored at a World Cup. In the quarter-finals, Argentina lost 1–2 against the Netherlands after a goal in the final minute, where moments after Argentine playmaker Ariel Ortega had been sent off for head-butting Dutch goalkeeper Edwin van der Sar, evening the teams at ten men a side, Dutch captain Frank de Boer launched a 60-yard pass directly to the right foot of Dennis Bergkamp on the right side of the penalty area. With his first touch, the striker known as "The Iceman" cut back to his left past defender Roberto Ayala. With his second touch, Bergkamp tucked a hard shot over keeper Carlos Roa into the top left corner. In the other quarter-final involving a South American side, Denmark put up much more of a battle than many thought possible, opening the score and later getting a 2–2 equalizer, but in the end, with two goals from Rivaldo, defending World Cup holders Brazil pulled out a 3–2 victory at the La Beaujoire Stadium.

Brazil faced the Netherlands in the semi-finals. Ronaldo scored in the 46th minute for Brazil, and Patrick Kluivert equalized for the Dutch in the 87th minute. A surprisingly tame match ended 1–1 after 120 minutes. Goalkeeper Claudio Taffarel made two diving saves in the shoot-out for Brazil as they defeated the Netherlands 4–2 on penalties and advanced to the final.

Entering its second straight final, Brazil were due to face host nation France, who had reached the final of the tournament for the first time. France won the match 3–0 to claim the World Cup for the first time, with the timing of the match two days before Bastille Day adding to the significance of the victory. Zinedine Zidane, who was named man of the match, scored twice before half-time and Emmanuel Petit added a third goal in the last minute. The match had an attendance in the region of 75,000. The match also saw speculation on the condition of the Brazilian striker Ronaldo, who had suffered a convulsive fit on the eve of the match. After initially being left out of the team sheet, in spite of his physical state, it was announced just 72 minutes before kick-off that Ronaldo would play. In the match, he sustained an injury in a clash with French goalkeeper Fabien Barthez. Although it was believed that the decision to play Ronaldo had backfired, it was understandable as the player had been a crucial member of the side throughout the tournament, having scored four goals and created three more. The final was also the heaviest defeat inflicted on Brazil since 1930.

=== 2002: Ecuador debut, Brazil's fifth World Cup title ===
At the 2002 FIFA World Cup, five nations from South America participated: Argentina, Brazil, Ecuador, Paraguay and Uruguay, with Ecuador making their World Cup finals debut. Paraguay's first match in their group was a 2–2 draw with South Africa, with their goals coming from Roque Santa Cruz and Francisco Arce. They then lost 1–3 to Spain in their second match before winning 3–1 over Slovenia, with a brace from Nelson Cuevas and a goal by Jorge Luis Campos, to qualify for the second round. The Brazilian team started the 2002 tournament with a 2–1 win against Turkey, followed by a 4–0 win against China and a 5–2 against Costa Rica, qualifying from the group stage with nine points out of nine. Argentina's first match in their group was a 1–0 win over Nigeria, and their second game a 0–1 defeat to England. In spite of entering the tournament as favorites, Argentina were eliminated in the first round following a 1–1 draw to Sweden in their third game. Ecuador were drawn in Group G with Italy, Mexico and Croatia. They were knocked out in the group stage, despite achieving a 1–0 victory over Croatia, who had come third at the previous edition of the World Cup; Ecuador lost their other two group matches 0–2 to Italy and 1–2 to Mexico. Uruguay, as dark horses of the group, failed to impress, with their high point being a goalless draw with a sub-par France side. Despite managing to put three goals past Senegal in a high-scoring draw, a loss to Denmark in Uruguay's opening game had dashed any hopes they may have had of qualifying for the last 16.

In the second round, Germany ended Paraguay's World Cup dreams with an 88th-minute goal, while Brazil won 2–0 against Belgium. To the surprise of the Brazilians themselves, referee Peter Prendergast disallowed a contentious Belgian goal by Marc Wilmots that would have given his side a 1–0 lead. Brazilian coach Luiz Felipe Scolari declared after the tournament that the match against Belgium had been the hardest for Brazil to win.

Against England in the quarter-finals, Brazil came from behind to win 2–1. Brazil's Ronaldinho caught out England goalkeeper David Seaman with a lobbed free kick from 42 yards to complete their comeback and see them advance into the final four. Ronaldinho also assisted teammate Rivaldo for Brazil's first goal, but was later sent off for stomping on the right ankle of England's Danny Mills.

Brazil's semi-final match was against Turkey, a team they had already faced in their group. Again, this match was difficult, as Brazil narrowly won 1–0 with a goal by Ronaldo, in the first game where Rivaldo did not score.

The final was between two of the most successful teams in the competition's history: Germany and Brazil. Incredibly, the teams had never played each other in the World Cup before, besides a match between Brazil and East Germany in the 1974 edition. German goalkeeper Oliver Kahn had been the tournament's best keeper, but was not able to keep out Brazil in the final, as Ronaldo vanquished his 1998 demons by scoring both goals in a 2–0 triumph. Ronaldo also won the Golden Shoe as the tournament's leading scorer, though Kahn was awarded the Golden Ball as the most outstanding player. This match also marked Brazilian captain Cafu's third straight appearance in a World Cup final, a feat yet to be equaled. The title marked Brazil's fifth World Cup championship, more than any other nation had achieved, also becoming the first team to win all seven of their games in the tournament, which were also done without the need for any extra time or penalty shoot-outs.

=== 2006: Ecuador reaches the Round of 16, Argentina and Brazil early finishes World Cup ===
At the 2006 FIFA World Cup, four nations from South America participated: Argentina, Brazil, Ecuador and Paraguay. Ecuador were drawn into Group A with hosts Germany, Poland, and Costa Rica. Wins over Poland and Costa Rica earned La Tri qualification to the knockout stage for the first time. Paraguay was participating in its third World Cup in a row. This time, back-to-back 0–1 defeats in their opening two matches, against England and Sweden, sent the team home early. Paraguay's only consolation was a 2–0 win over Trinidad and Tobago in their third and final group game. Argentina qualified from Group C with a game to spare, topping the group on goal difference after hammering Serbia and Montenegro 6–0 and beating the Ivory Coast 2–1. The Brazilians won all three games to qualify first in their group. Despite winning the first two games against Croatia (1–0) and Australia (2–0), Brazil didn't seem to play as well as expected and struggled to get past their opponents' defences. In Brazil's third game, manager Parreira tried a new squad with five former reserve players, including Robinho and Cicinho. The changes were successful, as the team managed a comfortable 4–1 win against Japan.

In the round of 16, Argentina struggled to break down Mexico, but nonetheless secured a 2–1 win thanks to a Maxi Rodríguez goal in extra time to put the Albiceleste into the quarter-finals. Ecuador were eliminated after losing 0–1 to England thanks to a David Beckham free kick. Brazil defeated Ghana 3–0 to advance, in a game which included Ronaldo's record fifteenth World Cup goal.

The quarter-final between Germany and Argentina ended 1–1 after extra time; the hosts edged out the Argentines 4–2 on penalties to go through to the semi-finals (this was the first time Argentina had lost a World Cup penalty shoot-out: up until this match, both Argentina and Germany had participated in three penalty shoot-outs, winning all of them). Argentina had scored first to grab a 1–0 lead. However, Michael Ballack's cross, flicked on by Tim Borowski, allowed Klose to head in the equalizer for Germany with ten minutes to spare. During the subsequent shoot-out, goalkeeper Jens Lehmann saved two shots while his teammates all scored to win the shoot-out 4–2. Brazil were also eliminated in the quarter-finals, after losing 0–1 against France. France was led by a rejuvenated Zinedine Zidane and by a strong defence which kept the Brazilian strikers under check for the duration of the game. Perhaps partially due to their uncommon formation, Brazil was shut out, attempting just one shot at French goalkeeper Fabien Barthez. The game was also notable for being the first time that the Brazil team had been shut out in three consecutive matches against France, now holding a 2–1–1 all-time record in World Cup matches played in 1986, 1998 and 2006 against the side. Following their elimination, the Brazil team was largely criticized by the press and the fans. The media circulated images of the left wingback Roberto Carlos tying his shoes while Thierry Henry ran unmarked to score the winning goal. Sporting legend Pelé blamed coach Parreira and Ronaldinho for the team's early exit.

=== 2010: Uruguay's fourth place, Paraguay's best ever performance ===
At the 2010 FIFA World Cup, five nations of South America participated: Argentina, Brazil, Chile, Paraguay and Uruguay. Chile were playing at the finals tournament for the first time since 1998. The South American teams performed strongly, with all five advancing to the knockout stage (four as group winners). In Group A, despite a red card being given to Uruguay substitute Nicolás Lodeiro in the second half, Uruguay were able to hold a "lacklustre" France to a 0–0 draw. They then won 3–0 against hosts South Africa and 1–0 against Mexico. As group winners Uruguay advanced to face the runners-up from Group B, South Korea. In Group B, Argentina won all of their matches. As group winners, they advanced to face Mexico in the last 16, just as they had in the previous tournament. Paraguay topped Group F undefeated with five points and advanced to face Japan, the runners-up of Group E. Paraguay drew two group matches and won 2–0 against Slovakia. As winners of Group G, Brazil advanced to play against Chile – runners-up in Group H – in the Round of 16. Brazil had won 2–1 against North Korea, 3–1 against the Ivory Coast and drawn 0–0 with Portugal. Chile, the group runners-up, had won 1–0 against both Honduras and Switzerland, but then lost 1–2 to Spain.

Uruguay's match against South Korea was the first of the round of 16. Uruguay won the match 2–1, with both of their goals coming from Luis Suárez, the second of which broke a 1–1 deadlock in the 80th minute. Suárez's first was scored after Diego Forlán made a low cross from the left that was not dealt with by the Korean defence, leaving Suárez to score at the back post. Uruguay subsequently adopted a defensive posture and Korea had more chances to score. Suárez's second goal was regarded as one of the tournament's best. Argentina met Mexico at Soccer City, and won the match 3–1 to book a rematch in the quarter-finals against Germany. The game was overshadowed by a refereeing error that allowed Argentina's opening goal. Carlos Tevez headed the ball into the net from a Lionel Messi pass in the 25th minute, but replays showed there were no players between Tevez and the goal, rendering it clearly offside. Replays of the incident were shown in the stadium but the decision to award the goal was not overturned. Tevez later admitted he knew that he was offside, but chose not to say anything. Argentina's second goal came from a defensive error from Ricardo Osorio, as a poor pass out of defence was snatched by Gonzalo Higuaín to round the keeper and score. After half-time, Tevez scored his second goal of the match to give Argentina a three-goal lead, with a long range shot that found the top corner of the Mexican goal. Javier Hernández scored for Mexico in the 71st minute but it turned out to be no more than a consolation, as Argentina held on to win 3–1. Brazil soundly defeated Chile 3–0 to progress to a quarter-final matchup against the Netherlands. Brazil's first goal came from a corner kick taken by Maicon in the 34th minute, with Juan heading the ball into the goal without being marked. Brazil then doubled the lead within five minutes after a free-flowing passing movement involving Robinho and Kaká that teed up Luís Fabiano to score after taking the ball around the Chilean goalkeeper. Robinho himself sealed victory for Brazil in the second half, scoring following a long run with the ball from Ramires. Paraguay and Japan met at the Loftus Versfeld Stadium. The match was decided by a penalty shoot-out since the score was locked at 0–0 after 120 minutes. Paraguay won the shoot-out and progressed to their first ever World Cup quarter-final. The match was a generally unexciting affair, as Japan adopted a defensive posture while Paraguay also maintained a solid defence. The first half produced the occasional chance on goal with Lucas Barrios having a shot saved, shortly before a long-distance shot from Daisuke Matsui hit the crossbar of Paraguay's goal. The second half was similar, with either side producing occasional chances to score rather than periods of dominance. The result of the deadlock was extra time, which continued goalless. A shoot-out ensued, in which Yuichi Komano missed a spot kick for Japan. Paraguay scored all five of their penalties, clinching the win and passage to the quarter-finals.

The Netherlands faced Brazil in the first quarter-final match. The Dutch side won 2–1 after recovering from a 0–1 deficit in the second half, knocking the five-time world champions Brazil out of the tournament. Brazil's coach Dunga confirmed after the match that he would be leaving the position upon the expiry of his contract, admitting responsibility for Brazil's defeat. Uruguay and Ghana met at Soccer City for a place in the semi-finals against the Netherlands. It was the first time that the teams had ever played each other in a senior competitive football match. After a dramatic 120 minutes of play (including extra time) that finished 1–1, Uruguay won in a penalty shoot-out 4–2. Uruguay dominated the early periods of the match, but suffered an injury to captain Diego Lugano in the first half. Just before half-time, Ghana took the lead when Sulley Muntari was allowed time on the ball by Uruguay, and took advantage by scoring with a shot from 40 yards. After half-time, Diego Forlán pulled Uruguay level with a free kick from the left side of the field that went over the head of Ghana's goalkeeper Richard Kingson. While both teams had chances to win, the match proceeded to extra time as the scores remained level. Late in extra time, Ghana sent a free kick into the area; Luis Suárez blocked Stephen Appiah's shot on the goal line. On the rebound, Dominic Adiyiah's header was heading into the goal, but Suárez blocked the shot with his hands to save what would have been a last-minute winner and was dismissed. Asamoah Gyan missed the ensuing penalty kick off the crossbar and Suárez could be seen celebrating the miss. In the shoot-out, Gyan this time did convert his penalty, as did every other player until the fourth round of spot kicks, when Adiyiah's penalty was saved by Uruguayan goalkeeper Fernando Muslera. Uruguay's Maxi Pereira then hit his penalty over the bar. However, Muslera would then saved captain John Mensah's, and Ghana's fifth, penalty. Sebastián Abreu converted Uruguay's fifth penalty by lightly chipping it Panenka-style to win the match. After the game, Suárez stated, "I made the save of the tournament," and, referring to the infamous handball goal scored by Diego Maradona in the 1986 World Cup, claimed that "The 'Hand of God' now belongs to me." Suárez argued he had no alternative and was acting out of instinct. Forlán agreed that Suárez saved the game: "Suárez this time, instead of scoring goals, he saved one, I think he saved the game. In the other quarter-final, Germany thrashed Argentina 4–0. This defeat was Argentina's biggest loss at a World Cup since 1974. Spain then defeated Paraguay 1–0. The first half of the match finished goalless, although both sides had chances to score and Paraguay's Nelson Valdez had a goal ruled out for offside. The match suddenly became eventful in the second half due to a string of penalty kicks. First, Óscar Cardozo was pulled down by Gerard Piqué in Spain's penalty area and Paraguay was awarded a penalty. Cardozo took the kick himself but it was saved by Spanish goalkeeper Iker Casillas. Spain then launched an attack at the other end of the field, in which David Villa was ruled by the referee to have been brought down by Antolín Alcaraz. Xabi Alonso stepped up to take the penalty kick and seemed to have scored, only for the referee to order it to be retaken because of encroachment by a Spanish player into the penalty area before the kick was taken. Xabi Alonso's retake was saved by Paraguayan goalkeeper Justo Villar and as a result, the score remained 0–0. However, Spain ultimately managed to score the winner in the 82nd minute; David Villa collected a rebounded shot off the post from Pedro, to score himself off the post.

Uruguay played the Netherlands in the first semi-final, with the Netherlands winning the match 3–2. Uruguay adopted a defensive formation early in the match, but were only able to hold their opponents scoreless for eighteen minutes, when Dutch captain Giovanni van Bronckhorst scored from 35 yards into the top right corner of the goal. However, the Netherlands were unable to capitalise on their lead, as Diego Forlán equalised in the 41st minute after his shot from 25 yards hit squarely in the middle of the goal was misjudged by goalkeeper Maarten Stekelenburg. The Netherlands regained the lead quickly, though, as a pass from Van der Vaart reached Sneijder who dished it into the side of the goal as Muslera dived and missed it by inches. Then, three minutes later, Kuyt crossed the ball to Robben, who headed it into the goal to make the match 3–1 for the Dutch. The Netherlands suffered a late scare when Maxi Pereira, who had missed a penalty in the shoot-out Ghana, scored in stoppage time from a free kick; however, the score remained 3–2 despite desperate Uruguayan attempts to equalise.

In the match for third place, Germany defeated Uruguay 3–2. Bastian Schweinsteiger managed to take a shot towards the goal, which Muslera rebounded towards Thomas Müller, who tapped in the opener. Uruguay forced their way back into the game after Luis Suárez's pass put Edinson Cavani through on the left, with Cavani sliding the ball low into the far corner to put his side on level terms after 28 minutes. Diego Forlán then put Uruguay ahead six minutes into in the second half, with a strong backheel kick from the edge of the penalty area finding the net while goalkeeper Hans-Jörg Butt stayed rooted to the spot. Marcell Jansen then equalized for Germany on 56 minutes after Muslera came for Jérôme Boateng's cross but missed, allowing Jansen to head into an empty net. Mesut Özil then took a corner in the 82nd minute, which reached Khedira in the air after rebounding, who headed it in to restore Germany's lead. Uruguay almost forced extra time when Forlán curled a 92nd-minute free kick onto the bar, but Germany held on to win the match. After the game, Uruguay coach Óscar Tabárez stated "We achieved an equal game against a real power, we could have won because in the game [they] were not superior to us, "We're not that far away [from Germany's level], the route has been marked, we must learn from this".

=== 2014: Drama for Brazil on home soil as Colombia shine and Argentina reach the final ===
The 2014 FIFA World Cup marked the fifth time the World Cup was hosted by a South American nation, with Brazil staging the tournament for the second time (the first instance being in 1950). Besides the hosts, five other CONMEBOL teams managed to qualify. Argentina, Colombia, Chile and Ecuador qualified directly via the qualification tournament, while Uruguay beat Jordan in the inter-continental play-offs. FIFA appointed Rio de Janeiro, Brasília, Belo Horizonte, São Paulo, Salvador, Fortaleza, Recife, Porto Alegre, Curitiba, Natal, Cuiabá and Manaus as host cities, with the final being played at the iconic Maracanã Stadium in Rio de Janeiro. Brazil, victorious in the 2013 FIFA Confederations Cup, were pre-tournament favourites, together with world champions Spain, Germany and their arch-rivals Argentina.

The months before the tournament were overshadowed by massive protests among many Brazilians, who accused Brazilian president Dilma Rousseff and her government of setting questionable priorities by pouring loads of money into the World Cup, when issues such as healthcare and education were considered more important and in more urgent need of financial aid by many. They also claimed both the Brazilian government and the FIFA were corrupt and didn't take the people's wishes into account. The protests were supported by many, including Brazilian legendary footballer Romário. Further anger was caused by the fact that several workers had died while working on the construction sites of the new stadiums, especially in São Paulo and Manaus. The construction of many stadiums was delayed, and the Arena da Baixada in Curitiba was almost taken out of the tournament. Some stadiums remained unfinished by the time the competition started.

The group stage kicked off on 12 June 2014, with Brazil taking on Croatia in São Paulo. The opening goal of the tournament was an own goal by Brazilian defender Marcelo, who became the first Brazilian ever to score an own goal at the FIFA World Cup. However, Brazil managed to turn the game around and eventually won 3–1. Brazil's second goal, scored by poster boy Neymar, was a controversially awarded penalty kick, which eventually led to the exclusion of Japanese referee Yuichi Nishimura from the remainder of the tournament. In their following group game, Brazil suffered a minor setback when they drew 0–0 against Mexico in Fortaleza, but they restored their supremacy with a resounding 4–1 victory over Cameroon in Brasília to secure top of the table in Group A.

In Group B, Chile faced world champions Spain, 2010 runners-up the Netherlands, and AFC minnows Australia, whom they managed to defeat 3–1 in their opening game in Cuiabá. The Chileans then managed to knock out the title holders in Rio de Janeiro, winning 2–0 with goals from Eduardo Vargas and Charles Aránguiz, only to go down by the same score in their final group match in São Paulo against the Netherlands, thus ending second in their group and going through to the round of 16.

Group C saw outsiders Colombia, who missed top striker Radamel Falcao due to an injury, take on Greece, Japan and the Ivory Coast. Los Cafeteros eased through their group with maximum points, defeating Greece 3–0 in Belo Horizonte, the Ivory Coast 2–1 in Brasília and Japan 4–1 in Cuiabá, with James Rodríguez emerging as a rising star after scoring in all three of their matches.

In Group D, Uruguay, who ended fourth in South Africa, started off with a shock, as they failed to overcome an offensive second half strategy by minnows Costa Rica and eventually went down 1–3 in Fortaleza, finishing the game with ten men. Uruguay's star player Luis Suárez was unavailable for the opening match due to injury, but returned for Uruguay's second game in São Paulo against England, where immediately became his country's hero as he scored twice to give Uruguay a 2–1 victory. However, in Uruguay's final group game in Natal, Suárez once again was the center of great controversy as he allegedly bit Italy defender Giorgio Chiellini. Although the referee missed the incident during the match, FIFA subsequently decided to hand Suárez a nine-month ban from all professional football, making him ineligible to compete in the rest of the tournament. Uruguay did still manage to progress to the round of 16, however, as Italian midfielder Claudio Marchisio received a red card and Diego Godín headed home Uruguay's winner in the 81st minute.

Ecuador became the only CONMEBOL nation not to reach the knockout stage. In Group E, La Tricolor suffered a late 1–2 defeat against Switzerland in Brasília, before beating Honduras by the same scoreline in Curitiba. Their 0–0 draw against France at the Maracanã was not enough to advance. All three Ecuadorian goals at the tournament were scored by striker Enner Valencia.

Argentina found themselves on enemy soil in Brazil, and struggled to impress in Group F, although they eventually managed to win all three of their group matches narrowly. Star forward Lionel Messi became Argentina's hero in the group phase, scoring four of Argentina's six goals. A 2–1 win over debutants Bosnia and Herzegovina in Rio de Janeiro was followed by a last-gasp 1–0 victory over Iran in Belo Horizonte, with Messi scoring to clinch a victory over the Asian hopefuls. Their group stage campaign ended with a tight 3–2 defeat of African champions Nigeria, with Messi scoring twice, as La Albiceleste progressed to the knockout phase with nine points out of nine.

The Round of 16 featured two all-South American encounters, with hosts Brazil taking on Chile in Belo Horizonte and Colombia facing Uruguay in Rio de Janeiro on the same day. The Brazilians started off very well against Jorge Sampaoli's Chile, with David Luiz scoring an early goal for the hosts. However, Chile soon regained their strength and Alexis Sánchez scored a well-deserved equaliser. The game went into extra time, and both Hulk and Mauricio Pinilla were close to giving their teams the lead, but in the end a penalty shoot-out proved unavoidable. The shoot-out was won 3–2 by Brazil, and the Seleção went into the quarter-finals at La Roja's expense, just as they had in 2010.

That night in the Maracanã, Colombia were victorious over Uruguay, as they reached the quarter-finals of the World Cup for the first time. James Rodríguez scored twice, once in each half, to bring his tournament tally to five goals and end Uruguayan hopes. Rodríguez's first goal, a chested-down long-range volley, was later elected the goal of the tournament.

The other South American team that reached the round of 16, Argentina, played three days later and needed extra time against Switzerland to secure a win in São Paulo, with their only goal being scored by Ángel Di María in the 118th minute.

In the quarter-finals, another South American matchup occurred as Brazil met Colombia in Fortaleza. Brazil claimed a 2–0 lead after 70 minutes, with both of their central defenders, captain Thiago Silva and David Luiz, finding the net, and Luiz scoring from a long-range free kick. The lead could not be undone by the Colombians, even though James Rodríguez scored from the penalty spot in the 80th minute. The game didn't end in joy for the Brazilians, though, as top striker Neymar was ruled out for the rest of the tournament with a back injury and captain Thiago Silva was suspended. Rodríguez's strike was his sixth of the tournament, and he eventually finished as the top scorer of the 2014 World Cup.

Argentina, the only other CONMEBOL representative left, also reached the semi-finals, defeating Belgium 1–0 in Brasília. An early strike from Gonzalo Higuaín was enough for the victory, and Alejandro Sabella's team steered through. A final between rivals Brazil and Argentina didn't seem unlikely.

However, in the semi-finals, things went horribly wrong for the hosts. In a historical encounter against the Germans, Brazil equalled their record worst-ever defeat as they were crushed 1–7 in Belo Horizonte, causing national tragedy and sorrow throughout Brazil. The game is known as the Mineirazo, and is widely remembered as one of the most stunning matches in both World Cup and football history. Felipe Scolari's team suffered the worst-ever defeat in a World Cup semi-final and ended the tournament with a negative goal difference, as Brazil's hopes of lifting the cup on home soil were ended. Germany's Miroslav Klose also overtook Ronaldo's record of fifteen World Cup goals during the match.

Argentina did manage to reach the final, as they proved themselves the better side in a thrilling penalty shoot-out against the Netherlands in São Paulo. Sergio Romero stopped two penalties and became Argentina's hero after the match had ended in a goalless draw.

In the match for third place in Brasília, Brazil was unable to recover from the shock demolition days earlier, and they lost 0–3 to a rampant Dutch side.

The final was played on 13 July in Rio de Janeiro, between Germany and Argentina. Both teams had good chances, and referee Nicola Rizzoli was criticized for not sending German goalkeeper Manuel Neuer off, but neither of the teams managed to score a goal. The decision finally fell against Argentina, as German substitute Mario Götze netted home a winner in the 113th minute. This marked the third World Cup in a row that Argentina lost to the Germans, as they fell short again to end as runners-up. Lionel Messi was awarded the Golden Ball for best player of the tournament, a decision that was highly contested. Germany became the first European team to lift the World Cup on South American soil.

=== 2018: Return of Peru and no South American team in the semi-finals ===
Group Stage: Uruguay, Argentina, Brazil and Colombia won the group stage, while France and Denmark beat Peru both by a scoreline of 1-0 to push Peru to third place in the group and therefore not qualifying.

Round of 16: Uruguay and Brazil beat Portugal and Mexico respectively. Meanwhile, Argentina and Colombia lost against France and England respectively. This is the first time since 1994 that Argentina did not win in the round of 16.

Quarters: Uruguay and Brazil lost to France and Belgium respectively. This resulted in no South American teams in the semi-finals.

=== 2022: The third Argentina World Cup title ===
Only four South Americans appeared for the first time since 2006, and again because Australia eliminated the team sent to the intercontinental repechage - this time around, Peru.

Group Stage: Argentina and Brazil won, while Ecuador and Uruguay lost against Netherlands & Senegal and Portugal & Korea. It was the first time since 2002 that only two South American teams won the group stage.

Round of 16: Argentina and Brazil beat Australia and Korea

Quarter-finals: Brazil was eliminated by Croatia, while Argentina won against Netherlands, both matches decided in penalty shoot-outs.

Semi-finals: Argentina won against Croatia (3x0).

Finals: in one of the best finals matches in the World Cup history, Argentina won against France in penalty shoot-outs (4x2), after 2x2 and 3x3 in the full time and extra time, respectively.

=== 2026: Argentina on the final again ===
The expansion from 32 to 48 teams raised South America's guaranteed spots to 6, and along with the four from 2022 qualifying again, Colombia returned after missing 2022 and Paraguay made its first appearance since 2010. Bolivia went to the intercontinental playoffs, but was eliminated by Iraq.

Uruguay was the only South American eliminated in the group stage, struggling to tie against Saudi Arabia, conceding a draw to Cape Verde, and ultimately losing to eventual champions Spain, in all three having goals caused by mistakes from goalkeeper Fernando Muslera. Ecuador disappointed in the first two games losing to Ivory Coast and failing to overcome goalkeeper Eloy Room in a 0–0 tie against Curaçao, but ultimately upset Germany to qualify through a third place spot. Paraguay also got a third place, as in spite of starting losing to co-hosts United States, they followed it defeating Turkey and a goal-less draw with Australia. The other three led their groups, Argentina winning all games (with Messi surpassing Klose as the tournament's top overall scorer, though Kylian Mbappé ended up leading the list by the end of the World Cup), Brazil drawing against Morocco but beating the next two games, and Colombia winning two before a draw with Portugal.

In the new round of 32, Ecuador was eliminated by co-hosts Mexico, Paraguay upset Germany eliminating them in the penalty shootouts, Colombia beat Ghana with an early goal, and both Brazil and Argentina came through in tight games, the former getting a comeback win against Japan in the final minutes, and the latter only eliminating Cape Verde on overtime after allowing the Africans to tie twice.

Only Argentina made it through the round of 16 getting a 3–2 comeback on Egypt in a game with highly contested officiating. Brazil continued to never win against Norway, Paraguay lost a close 1–0 to France where the only goal was a penalty, and Colombia fell to Switzerland on penalties.

The quarterfinals had Argentina beat Switzerland on extra time, and a comeback win against England on the semifinal qualified the team for its seventh World Cup final. Messi also managed to be the second player in three World Cup finals after Cafu. Spain's tactics hindered Argentina, who became the first team to not shoot on goal in regulation time, and Argentina constantly fouled its adversary, leading Enzo Fernández to get a red card. At extra time, Spain eventually came through with a Ferran Torres goal, and Argentina equaled Germany in losing four World Cup finals.
