= 2026 FIFA World Cup officiating controversies =

The 2026 FIFA World Cup was marked by a series of refereeing and VAR controversies across the group stage and knockout rounds, spanning disputed penalties, disallowed goals, and disciplinary decisions. Several incidents drew accusations of inconsistency in how similar fouls were treated between matches, prompting formal complaints to FIFA from national federations including Croatia and Egypt, as well as criticism from managers, players, and politicians over the severity or fairness of individual rulings. FIFA and its refereeing chief Pierluigi Collina defended the disputed decisions on multiple occasions, while some controversies became entangled with wider allegations of bias, racism, and political interference in the tournament.

== Group stage ==
=== Mexico vs South Africa ===
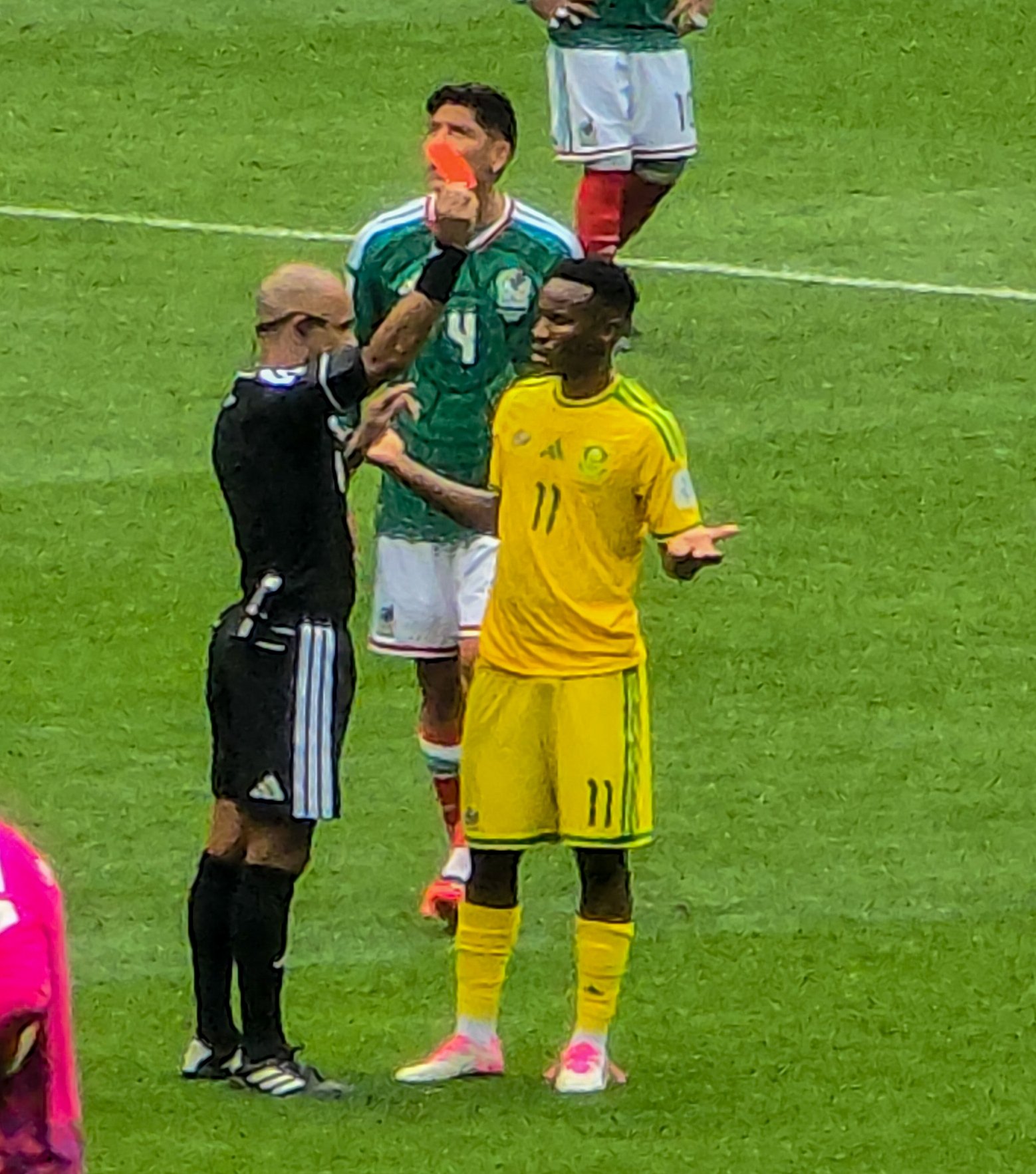
South Africa's Themba Zwane is shown a red card against Mexico, one of three players to be sent off during the game.

In the opening match between hosts Mexico and South Africa, three red cards were shown, making it the first World Cup opening match to feature three red cards. The decisions prompted controversy, with South Africa finishing the match with nine players. Head coach Hugo Broos criticized referee Wilton Sampaio, arguing that Themba Zwane had been blocked by Mexico defender Roberto Alvarado before being judged to have used a raised arm, describing the foul as "too soft" for a red card. He further commented Zwane's 3-match suspension as "too severe" and that they would appeal FIFA's decision, comparing the incident with that of Lionel Messi on Aïssa Mandi which went unreviewed by VAR. However, Broos accepted Sphephelo Sithole's sending-off for denying an obvious goalscoring opportunity by Brian Gutiérrez. Mexico defender César Montes was also sent off after bringing down Khuliso Mudau to deny a goalscoring opportunity.

=== Argentina vs Algeria ===
During Argentina's opening game against Algeria in Group J, that ended in a 3–0 win for Argentina, Lionel Messi committed a 30th minute studs-up challenge on Algeria captain Aïssa Mandi. Messi's foul went unpunished by Polish referee Szymon Marciniak or the VAR, despite protests by the Algerian squad. After the game the Algerian Football Federation (AFF) sent an official complaint to FIFA over refereeing decisions during the game. The incident got further attention following the sending off of the United States striker Folarin Balogun over a similar foul. However refereeing experts have defended the decision to not give a red card to Messi, claiming the play did not have the intensity or intention necessary for him to be expelled.

=== Argentina vs Austria ===
During a match between Argentina and Austria, Lionel Messi opened the scoring after a controversial build-up involving a challenge by Alexis Mac Allister on Austria midfielder Xaver Schlager. Schlager went down after the tackle, with Austrian players arguing that a foul should have been awarded before Argentina continued the attack. The referee Amin Omar allowed play to continue, and VAR reviewed the incident but decided not to intervene, allowing Messi's goal to stand. Austria manager Ralf Rangnick later called the decision annoying, questioning why the foul was not given and why VAR did not recommend a review considering how the tackle is similar to one that caused a penalty for Argentina. After the game ended the goal was claimed to be "hard to disallow" by panelists due to the amount of plays the Argentinian team did after the ball was won, but that if the play had been seen earlier it would have been probably called a foul. The goal came under further scrutiny following Argentina's round of 16 match against Egypt, where Egypt's second goal by Mostafa Ziko was disallowed by VAR due to a foul in the build-up that occurred at the other end of the pitch.

=== Canada vs Qatar ===
Qatar midfielder Assim Madibo received a five-match suspension after being sent off in his nation's group stage defeat to Canada for a challenge that broke the left leg of Canadian midfielder Ismaël Koné. FIFA's disciplinary committee increased the automatic one-match suspension to five matches following a review of the incident. The severity of the punishment prompted debate among commentators, many of whom argued that the challenge lacked the force or intent normally associated with such an extended suspension.

=== England vs Ghana ===
England vs Ghana

In the 79th minute of the group stage match between England and Ghana, England defender Ezri Konsa had a notable collision with Ghana forward Prince Kwabena Adu in the England penalty area. Referee Saíd Martínez did not award a penalty, prompting Ghana manager Carlos Queiroz to comment that VAR had "gone for a coffee". Earlier in the second half, England goalkeeper Jordan Pickford collided with Adu outside the penalty area while attempting to clear the ball. Martínez awarded a free kick to England and no card was shown, with VAR again declining to intervene. Queiroz criticized the officials for "two major incidents" involving Pickford and Konsa that he believed had gone unpunished.

==== Application of the "Vinícius Law" ====
On June 23, following the 0–0 draw between England and Ghana, English midfielder Jude Bellingham became the subject of controversy after television cameras captured him covering his mouth while speaking to Ghanaian players and members of the coaching staff. The incident drew comparisons with the recent dismissal of Paraguayan player Miguel Almirón under the so-called "Vinícius Law", a FIFA regulation introduced to sanction players who concealed their speech during confrontational situations. Several media outlets and the Paraguayan Football Association questioned the consistency of the rule's application, arguing that Bellingham had not been sanctioned for similar conduct. Ghana manager Carlos Queiroz also accused Bellingham of using offensive language during exchanges with members of the Ghana bench following a foul on Jerome Opoku, although no disciplinary action was taken by the referee or the video assistant referee (VAR). FIFA officials later indicated that the regulation only applied when the gesture occurred in a confrontational context, and the exchange between Bellingham and Jordan Ayew was deemed non-confrontational. Ecuador's Piero Hincapié became the second player at the tournament to be sent off for covering his mouth while confronting Mexico's Santiago Giménez in their round of 32 fixture, with the incident reviewed by VAR and leading to a red card issued by referee Slavko Vinčić in stoppage time.

=== Egypt vs Iran ===
The group-stage game between Egypt and Iran was overshadowed by a stoppage-time disallowed winner. In the final moments, Mohammad Ghorbani's shot deflected through Hamza Abdelkarim before Shoja Khalilzadeh bundled the ball into the net from close range. Iran initially celebrated a dramatic late winner, but after a VAR review supported by semi-automated offside technology (SAOT), the goal was disallowed. Khalilzadeh was ruled narrowly offside by the tip of his boots, having been fractionally ahead of the goalkeeper Mostafa Shobeir and the last defender at the moment Ghorbani's shot was taken. Egyptian players also protested a possible handball by Shahriyar Moghanlou during the buildup. The decision stood after review, leaving the match level at 1–1 and confirming Iran's third-place finish in Group G with three draws, which was not enough to secure a place among the top eight third-placed teams advancing to the knockout stage.

== Knockout stage ==
=== Argentina vs Cape Verde ===
During the Round of 32 match between Argentina and Cape Verde, an extra-time goal was ultimately recorded as an own goal after deflecting off the arm of Cape Verde defender Diney following a header from Cristian Romero from a Lionel Messi corner. The goal proved decisive as Argentina won 3–2 after extra time in Miami.

The match also attracted criticism; the Lusophone media questioned several officiating decisions, including allowing Messi to take a free kick while Cape Verde goalkeeper Vozinha was still organizing his wall, alleged inconsistency in the enforcement of fouls, a disputed stoppage in play involving Argentina defender Nicolás Tagliafico, and the calculation of added time. Some outlets described the refereeing as biased toward Argentina.

=== Germany vs Paraguay ===
During extra time in the round of 32 match between Germany and Paraguay, a goal scored by German defender Jonathan Tah was disallowed following a VAR review; referee Jalal Jayed ruled that Germany's Waldemar Anton had committed a foul on Paraguay goalkeeper Orlando Gill in the buildup. The decision was controversial, with Germany head coach Julian Nagelsmann describing the call as "a joke", arguing that no clear foul had occurred. The match ended 1–1 and Germany ultimately lost 4–3 on penalties, their first ever World Cup penalty shoot-out defeat. FIFA later defended the decision, stating that officials had been instructed to penalize similar blocking incidents involving goalkeepers, and that the intervention was consistent with pre-tournament guidance.

=== Belgium vs Senegal ===
Senegal were eliminated with a 3–2 defeat against Belgium, after Belgium scored a VAR-awarded penalty in the stoppage time of extra time. The decision followed a review of a challenge by Lamine Camara on Youri Tielemans, which Tielemans converted to complete Belgium's comeback from a 2–0 deficit. The call sparked controversy, with critics arguing that Tielemans stepped across Camara and initiated the contact.

=== United States vs Bosnia and Herzegovina ===
During the round of 32 match between the United States and Bosnia and Herzegovina, United States forward Folarin Balogun was shown a straight red card in the second half by referee Raphael Claus following a VAR review, after Balogun's foot had landed on the ankle of Bosnia defender Tarik Muharemović during an aerial challenge for the ball. The decision proved highly controversial, with many commentators describing the dismissal as excessive or incorrect. Several pundits also compared the incident to Lionel Messi avoiding a red card for a similar challenge on Aïssa Mandi during Argentina's group stage match against Algeria, with some questioning whether the earlier decision reflected inconsistency in refereeing standards.

During the same match, Bosnia and Herzegovina manager Sergej Barbarez was involved in a confrontation with the officiating team and several United States players, which resulted in him receiving a yellow card for unsportsmanlike conduct. Barbarez reacted angrily after referee Claus did not award Bosnia and Herzegovina a free kick following an apparent foul by U.S. defender Antonee Robinson on Esmir Bajraktarević. As play continued near the Bosnian bench, Barbarez picked up the ball and protested to the officials, refusing at one point to hand it back to Malik Tillman when he attempted to restart play. He eventually relinquished the ball after being confronted by Claus, who then issued a yellow card for unsporting behaviour and deliberate delay of play. The incident drew discussion among commentators about managerial conduct and touchline discipline in high-pressure matches.

==== Suspension of Balogun's red card ====
Folarin Balogun's controversial dismissal against Bosnia and Herzegovina initially carried an automatic one-match suspension which would have kept him out of the United States' round of 16 match against Belgium. However, FIFA suspended the ban and Balogun was allowed to play. The decision was applauded by U.S. officials, but was criticized abroad due to suspicions that Balogun was being allowed to play due to interference by President Trump.

=== Portugal vs Croatia ===
Igor Matanović was determined to have made contact with the ball, as shown in the ball sensor readout.

During the round of 32 match between Portugal and Croatia, a VAR review led to a penalty being awarded to Portugal after contact between Nikola Vlašić and Renato Veiga in the penalty area, a decision that proved controversial, with Croatia captain Luka Modrić arguing that both players were grappling and that such incidents should not result in a penalty. Portugal subsequently advanced after a further VAR intervention ruled out a late Croatia equaliser, as Joško Gvardiol's stoppage-time goal was disallowed for offside in the buildup. Officials determined that Igor Matanović had made a slight touch on the ball, which clipped off the head of Veiga, a sequence confirmed using FIFA's Connected Ball technology with IMU sensors embedded in the match ball. The touch affected the offside line, leaving Mario Pašalić in an offside position before Gvardiol scored, and the decision was upheld after review, with Portugal winning 2–1 to advance to the round of 16.

After the game, the Croatian Football Federation (HNS) filed a formal complaint to FIFA regarding its "dissatisfaction" with the officiating process and the use of VAR technology during the match. The letter, addressed to FIFA president Gianni Infantino, explained what HNS believed to be the "incorrect application of VAR and ball sensor technology." The refereeing decisions spurred widespread negative reactions from fans and Croatian media.

=== Paraguay vs France ===
Ahead of the round of 16 match between Paraguay and France, controversy surrounded comments by former Paraguay goalkeeper José Luis Chilavert, who referred to France as "a squad from Africa", remarks that were strongly condemned as racist by French Football Federation president Philippe Diallo. The match, played in extreme heatwave conditions reaching 38 °C (100 °F) in Philadelphia, was marked by several second-half flashpoints. Paraguay's Gustavo Velázquez was accused of scuffing the penalty spot shortly before Kylian Mbappé converted a decisive penalty. Earlier, Ousmane Dembélé briefly held the ball to distract attention from the designated taker, Mbappé. There was also a confrontation between Paraguay's Matías Galarza and France's Michael Olise, which led to Olise being booked after Galarza went down holding his face following minimal contact. Referee Ilgiz Tantashev faced criticism for his management of these incidents. The match also saw a foul count of thirteen committed by Paraguay and eleven by France, with France receiving three yellow cards and Paraguay none. The officiating was widely criticised by fans and former footballers.

Following the match, France captain Kylian Mbappé criticized Paraguay's physical approach, describing it as "dirty" and saying that "we can play that way too" if necessary, while arguing that repeated fouls disrupted the match. France manager Didier Deschamps also criticized Paraguay's approach, saying: "They used every resource possible" and that there were "insults from the bench." He added, "Every team can play however they want," while questioning the lack of Paraguayan bookings. Paraguay head coach Gustavo Alfaro defended his players after the defeat, saying they had "fought like lions" and highlighting the adversity many had overcome, including that "we have players who never knew their fathers," as he argued the team deserved recognition for reaching the round of 16 despite difficult personal backgrounds. The French Football Federation (FFF) also lodged an appeal with FIFA seeking to have Michael Olise's yellow card against Paraguay rescinded, arguing it resulted from an incorrect officiating decision. FIFA later rejected the appeal, with France head coach Deschamps confirming that Olise's booking would stand, meaning if he received another yellow card in France's upcoming quarterfinal against Morocco (he ultimately didn’t) he would be suspended for the semifinal.

=== Mexico vs England ===
During the round of 16 match between Mexico and England, England defender Jarell Quansah was shown a red card for his challenge on Jesús Gallardo, after catching the latter high on his left leg, with the dismissal confirmed following a VAR review. Later in the match, referee Alireza Faghani awarded Mexico a penalty following a VAR review after England captain Harry Kane was judged to have fouled Mexico's Brian Gutiérrez inside the penalty area. Following England's 3–2 victory, their head coach Thomas Tuchel criticized the officiating, describing the referee and fourth official as "not good enough" and questioning both the penalty decision and FIFA's appointment of an all-South American VAR team for the match.

A UK Labour Party lawmaker, Noah Law, called for Jarell Quansah's suspension following his red card against Mexico to be treated in a comparable manner to the Balogun case, urging a delay in enforcing the ban. He argued that fairness and tournament integrity depend on the consistent application of disciplinary rules across all teams, warning that differing outcomes in similar cases could undermine confidence in FIFA's disciplinary system. Despite calls for a review, FIFA upheld its decision on Quansah's red card punishment. The disciplinary committee ruled that his challenge on Gallardo constituted serious foul play, adding an extra match to the automatic one-game suspension and resulting in a two-game ban.

=== Argentina vs Egypt ===
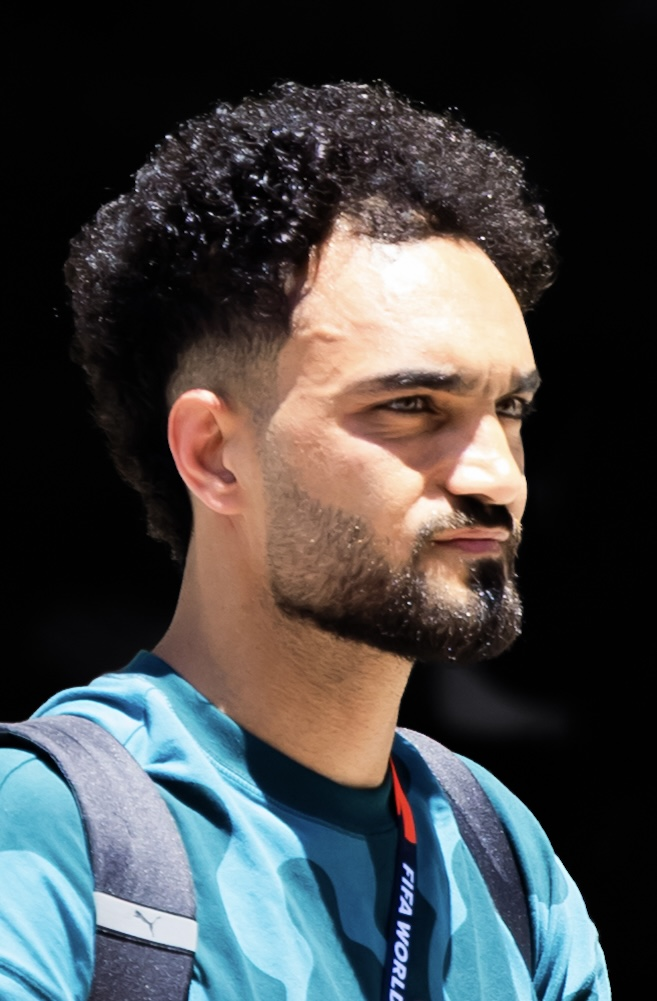
Mostafa Ziko's goal against Argentina was ruled out due to a foul made in the buildup.

During the round of 16 match between Argentina and Egypt, Egypt's second goal by Mostafa Ziko was disallowed following a VAR review. The video footage established that Marwan Attia had pulled Argentine defender Lisandro Martínez's shirt and stood on his foot during the buildup, which led referee François Letexier to rule out the goal for a foul. The decision sparked controversy; critics argued that VAR had exceeded its intended role, while others defended the call, noting that any foul leading directly to a goal could be reviewed under VAR protocol. Egypt later restored a 2–0 lead when Ziko scored again, but Argentina completed a late comeback to win 3–2.

After the match, Egypt protested Argentina's stoppage-time winner, claiming a shirt pull by Alexis Mac Allister on Hamdy Fathy in the buildup. The Egyptian team also demanded a VAR review following a play where Egypt captain Mohamed Salah fell after Julián Alvarez took possession of the ball inside the Argentina penalty area. Egypt goalkeeper Mostafa Shobeir was booked for protesting the decision regarding the Hamdy Fathy incident, arguing that Fathy's shirt had been torn during the play and that Fathy had not torn it himself.

In the 43rd minute of the match, Argentina defender Nahuel Molina made contact with Egypt's main midfielder, Emam Ashour, in the face on the field, without the referee or VAR intervening to review the incident, despite the demands of the Egyptian national team players.

Letexier was criticized for inconsistent officiating, with pundits such as former football players Ian Wright and Sam Allardyce noting the shirt pull by Mac Allister and challenge by Alvarez to have been similar to the foul that led to Egypt's disallowed goal. Goalkeeper coach Saafan El-Sagheer was sent off for his reaction toward Letexier, while Egypt head coach Hossam Hassan was booked during the protests and crossed his arms in an "X" gesture, which is recognized by FIFA as part of an official protocol for reporting racist incidents during a match. Following the match, Letexier was questioned for failing to follow FIFA's anti-racism protocol in response to Hassan's alert. The reasoning for Hassan's initiation of the anti-racism protocol remained unclear, as neither Hassan nor the Egyptian Football Association reported any cases of discrimination during the match. However, journalist Ibrahim Desouki later claimed that Hassan reportedly made the sign after one of his aides translated an active racist Argentinian fan chant – "Beat those monkeys" – for him.

In his post-match interview, Ziko said that "We were hard done by [the referee] today, and everyone saw that. ... After the 2–0 result, everything went against us and worked against us. I don't even know why the second goal was disallowed, I don't see any reason for it. ... He wanted to disallow the third one too, but thank God, God didn't grant him success." He also called the World Cup "rigged" in favor of Argentina and labelled referee François Letexier as "unfair". Hassan criticized the officiating, stating that there had been "no respect or fair play" during the match and suggesting that officials may have wanted to keep the defending champions in the tournament and preserve Lionel Messi's chances of advancing.

The Egyptian Football Association filed an official complaint with FIFA over the referee's decisions, demanding "the exclusion of the referee and the entire crew from the World Cup after investigating these mistakes" and alleging "the crime of discrimination against the Egyptian national team". Letexier's Instagram account was deactivated amid the widespread criticism. FIFA refereeing chief Pierluigi Collina defended the officials' decisions, rejecting allegations of bias and saying that World Cup referees operate independently. He said criticism of refereeing decisions was part of football but condemned claims questioning the integrity of match officials. Collina said VAR had correctly overturned Egypt's disallowed goal due to a foul in the build-up, while the decision not to award Egypt a penalty before Argentina's winning goal was also deemed correct. The Argentine Football Association (AFA) was also affected; on July 9, journalists on the association's press list received an email sent from an AFA institutional account. It stated that "Argentina did not win", called the result a product of "corrupt refereeing decisions", and praised Egypt's performance. The AFA said the message had not been written or authorised by its communications team, warned recipients to disregard any unusual emails coming from its address, and admitted the account had possibly suffered unauthorised access, which it was investigating.

=== France vs Morocco ===
Ahead of the quarterfinal between France and Morocco, FIFA appointed an all-Argentine team of match officials to oversee the fixture, marking the first time in the tournament that every on-field official came from the same country. Facundo Tello was named as referee, assisted by fellow Argentines Juan Pablo Belatti and Gabriel Chade, with Darío Herrera as fourth official and Cristian Navarro as reserve assistant referee.

The appointment drew criticism on social media given the rivalry between France and Argentina, the reigning champions, who were considered one of France's main rivals to win the tournament. FIFA noted that the confederation-neutrality principle underlying its appointments—assigning officials from a confederation with no stake in either side—was satisfied by a CONMEBOL crew for a UEFA (France) versus CAF (Morocco) knockout match.

Members of the France squad downplayed the appointment. Defender Dayot Upamecano said he would not "focus on who the referee will be," while goalkeeper Robin Risser urged teammates to avoid "paranoia" ahead of kickoff. Head coach Didier Deschamps, referring to the Argentina–Egypt match, added that he hoped "our officials are as good as Monsieur Letexier was."

Moroccan fans reportedly disrupted France's night at their hotel in Boston before the match by setting off fireworks, honking cars, and playing drums outside. Security intervened, and the noise later stopped.

Following France's 2–0 victory, Morocco head coach Mohamed Ouahbi criticized referee Facundo Tello for allowing France's opening goal to stand, claiming that Adrien Rabiot had handled the ball in the build-up before Kylian Mbappé scored and that some of his players had stopped playing because they believed a handball had occurred.

=== England vs Norway ===
During the quarterfinal match between England and Norway, England's equaliser scored by Jude Bellingham was allowed to stand despite claims that an infringement had occurred during the build-up, with the ball alleged to have hit one of the cables suspended above the pitch for the aerial camera; following a goal kick from Norwegian goalkeeper Ørjan Nyland, England regained possession through Elliot Anderson and went on to score, although FIFA rules stated that play should be restarted with a dropped ball if the ball made contact with the camera cable. Norway players and manager Ståle Solbakken protested that the ball had changed trajectory after striking the cable, while television pundits and former referee Mark Clattenburg argued that play should have been stopped and a dropped ball awarded. However, FIFA stated that data from the connected ball showed no peak in the "heartbeat of the ball" while it was in the air, and therefore there was no evidence that the ball touched the overhead wire or that the contact changed its movement.

=== Argentina vs Switzerland ===
In the quarterfinal against Argentina, Switzerland's Breel Embolo was initially involved in a VAR review after Leandro Paredes was shown a yellow card by Referee João Pinheiro for an alleged foul on him. However, under FIFA's new "mistaken identity" rule, VAR was able to review the decision and determine that Embolo had simulated the contact. Paredes' booking was rescinded and Embolo received a second yellow card for simulation, resulting in his dismissal. Embolo left the pitch in tears, leaving Switzerland with 10 players. The match was level at 1–1 at the time, before Argentina went on to win 3–1 after extra time.

After the match, Switzerland manager Murat Yakin criticized the VAR intervention, saying there was "definitely no reason" to issue a yellow card as it was "a harmless situation". He called the rule "unacceptable", said it had "destroyed our game", and described Embolo's dismissal as "a refereeing mistake". Captain Granit Xhaka also said the decision had "killed the game", while Remo Freuler called on FIFA to explain the VAR intervention. On 28 July, 2026 IFAB clarified that the VAR's decision regarding Embolo's red card was wrong and he shouldn't have been sent off. The IFAB also said “The use of the mistaken identity clause to deal with simulation during the FIFA World Cup 2026 was well received” meaning this so called clarification is fake. The Mistaken identity rule was also applied in the group stage match between United States and Paraguay to show Almirón a yellow card.

=== France vs Spain ===
In the semifinal against Spain, France's Lucas Digne conceded a penalty in the 22nd minute after a failed clearance resulted in a foul on Lamine Yamal, allowing Mikel Oyarzabal to open the scoring from the spot. The decision was debated by fans and French players, who questioned whether Yamal had handled the ball before the incident, but VAR upheld the penalty decision. France manager Didier Deschamps later questioned whether referee Iván Barton was suitable to officiate a World Cup semifinal, citing several decisions that he felt went against his team.

=== Argentina vs Spain ===
In the 96th minute, Nico Williams of Spain appeared to score, after the ball fell to him following a play done by Merino, but the goal was disallowed because Merino had stepped on Otamendi's foot. The decision provoked significant controversy, as did the failure of VAR to review the decision. Nabid Yeasin of The Daily Star wrote that Merino's foul was the "type of offence for which referees usually do not even call a penalty as they look for harsher contacts inside the penalty area for it to be deemed a foul. In fact, replays appeared to show that it was Otamendi who had his arm around Merino." During the match, after the goal was disallowed, Spain fans sarcastically chanted "Infantino", referencing allegations of FIFA favoring Argentina.

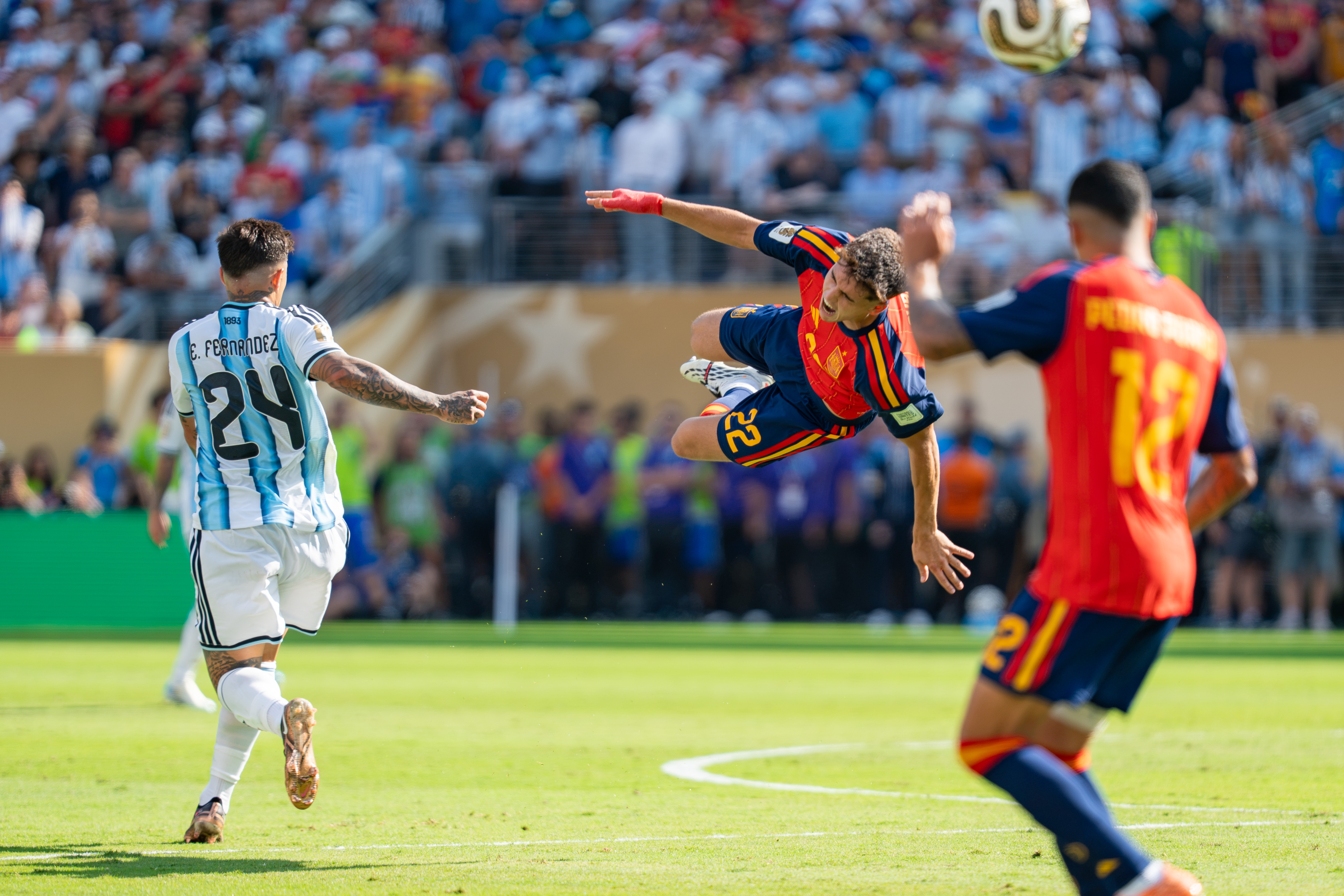
Challenge that resulted in a second yellow card for Enzo Fernández

In the 82nd minute, Argentine midfielder Enzo Fernández went to ground following contact from Spain's Rodri and was booked for dissent after the referee did not award a foul. In the third minute of second-half stoppage time, Fernández was shown a second yellow card, and a resulting red, for a challenge on Spain's Pau Cubarsí; a VAR review upheld the on-field decision as correct. Commentary was divided on responsibility for the two cautions: former FIFA referee Keith Hackett argued Fernández was fortunate not to be booked more severely for his conduct, while other commentary described the second caution as "estúpida" ("stupid") and debated whether it reflected a refereeing error or an avoidable action by the player himself. Fernández's dismissal left Argentina to play extra time with ten men; Spain went on to win 1–0 following a goal by Ferran Torres. The Guardian was among outlets to frame the numerical disadvantage as decisive to the result.

In the same passage of stoppage time, following Fernández's dismissal, Spain's Marc Cucurella briefly covered his mouth while speaking to Argentina players during a heated exchange. Argentina captain Lionel Messi and Fernández appealed to referee Slavko Vinčić for a red card under the tournament's rule penalizing concealed speech during confrontations, introduced earlier in the competition following an incident involving Gianluca Prestianni. Vinčić did not award a card, and the no-card decision was generally supported by commentators, including former players Lee Dixon and Wayne Rooney, who criticized Messi's appeal.

Following the match, Argentina defender Nicolás Otamendi accused Spain captain Rodri of having influenced match officials, alleging that Spanish players had pressured referees throughout the tournament. A brawl broke out among players from both teams after the final whistle. More than 82,000 Argentina supporters subsequently signed a petition calling for the final to be replayed.
