= Stephen Bennett (guitarist) =

American guitarist and harp guitarist

Stephen M. Bennett
- Bennett with "Big Mama," his 1909 Dyer harp guitar.

Background information
- Born: Stephen M. Bennett; 1956 (age 69–70); Oregon, U.S.
- Genres: Fingerstyle guitar, Acoustic music, Harp guitar
- Occupations: Musician, composer, educator
- Instruments: Guitar, harp guitar, National steel guitar
- Years active: 1983–present
- Labels: Cimirron/Rainbird, Narada, Harp Guitar Music
- Website: Official website

Stephen M. Bennett (born 1956) is an American fingerstyle guitarist and harp guitarist who resides in West Cornwall, Connecticut. He is the founder of the annual Harp Guitar Gathering. In 2024, Bennett won the International Finger Style Guitar Championship at the Walnut Valley Festival. He also won the festival's National Flatpicking Championship in 1987, placed second in the Flatpicking Championship in 1983, and placed third in the Fingerstyle Championship in 1985.

He has been described as a key force in the harp guitar's revival and one of its best known modern players. He has been profiled in regional publications. Stephen is a longtime friend and sometimes collaborator of Australian guitarist Tommy Emmanuel. On March 22, 2025, he appeared as a featured guest performer at New York's Carnegie Hall.

== Early life and career ==
Bennett was born in Oregon and grew up in Cornwall, New York where he was trained on the piano and clarinet and began learning the guitar on his own. By the time he was in high school he had purchased an electric guitar and started playing in bands. He moved to Virginia in 1977 and continued playing in various bands through the end of 1978. It was not long after moving to Virginia that he became interested in fingerstyle guitar after being exposed to the music of Leo Kottke and Doc Watson.

He graduated from William & Mary with a degree in history in 1980. While working at a department store, Bennett acquired a National steel guitar that a manager had been using as a prop to sell jeans. During those days he was playing a Martin twelve-string and began looking for a used six-string guitar, a search that led to teaching offers at two music stores. By 1982 Bennett quit his job at the department store to teach guitar. One of the shop owners introduced him to the music of Tony Rice and encouraged him to enter competitions. He won a local bluegrass competition before placing second in the flatpicking category at the Walnut Valley Festival's National Flatpicking Championship in 1983, where he met fellow competitor Pat Donohue.

He received his great-grandfather's 1909 Dyer harp guitar in 1988 and began incorporating it into his performances. He stopped using a flatpick entirely in 2007, citing strain from alternating between flatpicking and fingerstyle technique.

== Harp Guitar Gathering ==
In 2003, Bennett invited musicians he had encountered through his travels and correspondence who he knew played the harp guitar to meet up with him in Williamsburg, VA. These folks included: Gregg Miner, John Doan, Andy Wahlberg, and Bob Hartman. The event has continued annually ever since and is now the Harp Guitar Gathering. It is has been hosted by various players and occurs in various locations including Virginia, Oregon, Florida, Indiana, Connecticut, Texas, Idaho, North Carolina, and California. It has drawn attendees from around the world including Canada, Japan, Australia, England, Belgium, and other countries.

== Influence ==
In 2012, Gregg Miner organized other guitarists and harp guitarists to create The Water Is Wide: A Tribute to Stephen Bennett, a compilation album that includes pieces written by Bennett and performed by other musicians as well as pieces composed by other musicians for him. This album was presented to him at the 10th annual Harp Guitar Gathering. Notable contributors included Tommy Emmanuel and Don Alder.Fingerstyle guitarist Andy McKee has said that he became infatuated with the harp guitar after seeing Bennett perform live in 1999. Guitarist Travis Bowman has cited Bennett among his fingerstyle influences along with Leo Kottke, Michael Hedges, and Andy McKee, and Nashville-based guitarist Landon Fishburne has said he studied under Bennett. Guitarist Matt Thomas has performed several of Bennett's compositions in concert, including "Waltz for a Maple Tree," "Perestroika," and "November."

Rush guitarist Alex Lifeson has credited Bennett with introducing him to the partial capo. The two got together to play some acoustic guitars after a Stephen Bennett performance and that is when Bennett gave him a partial capo and encouraged him to experiment with open strings. Lifeson was creatively inspired and went on to use the technique on the song "Bravest Face" from Rush's 2007 album Snakes & Arrows.

== Musical style ==
Bennett's repertoire ranges from pop standards, such as Cole Porter's "Begin the Beguine" and John Lennon's "Imagine," to arrangements of old-time fiddle tunes, and his own original compositions. He has stated that how he uses the harp guitar’s sub-bass string depends upon the material: "On standards I use the subbass strings to fill out the arrangements. It's great to be able to hit those low notes. On my own tunes I use the subbasses to extend the chords rather than just using them to thump out an occasional bass note." Reviewers have described Bennett's repertoire as "widely varied."

Bennett said that the possibilities of the harp guitar were immediately apparent to him early on: "As a solo guitarist, it took me less than five minutes to realize the enormous possibilities inherent in the instrument... the sounds that emanated from the beginning intrigued me, and I was aware that compositions were going to flow forth from it."

Bennett is also credited with a often referenced sub-bass string tuning for the harp guitar, known as "Bennett tuning," which uses a re-entrant first sub-bass string tuned higher in pitch than the lowest string on the main fretboard. Guitarist Frank Doucette used the tuning on his track "G Wiz," included on The Water Is Wide: A Tribute to Stephen Bennett.

== Discography ==
=== Solo albums ===
- Tangier Morning (1988)
- The Nutcracker Suite for Guitar Orchestra (1990)
- Solos & Duets (1992)
- Guitar Town (1994)
- Pictures (1996)
- Harp Guitar (1998)
- No Net (1999)
- Tunes (2000)
- River (2001)
- Ten (2002)
- Slide Area Ahead (2002)
- Music From Tsenacommacah (2003)
- Everything Under the Sun (2004)
- Beatles – Solos For Acoustic Guitar (2005)
- Christmas Acoustic Guitar Solos (2005)
- Reflections (2006)
- Alert The Authorities (2008)
- Good Wood (2009)
- In-A-Gadda-Da-Stephen (2010)
- High Street (2012)
- Cool Tunes For Harp Guitar (2012)
- The Nutcracker – Complete Ballet Score for Guitar Orchestra (2013)
- Still On The Line (2014)
- More Beatles (2014)
- The Powhatan Suite (2016)
- Tone Poet (2016)
- Even More Beatles (2016)
- Music From Connecticut (2017)
- Fifty Years, and Counting... (2017)
- Passages (2019)
- SB (2023)
- Still Got It (2025)
- Train Of Life (2026)

=== Collaborations ===
- This Virginia Town (with Bill Gurley, 1989)
- Bennett & Gurley (with Bill Gurley, 1997)
- Brothers (with Jim Bennett, 2007)
- SB (Squared) (with Stephen C. Bennett, 2024)

=== Compilations ===
- Guitar Fingerstyle (1996)
- Masters Of The Acoustic Guitar (1997)
- Best of Stephen Bennett (2002)
- Harp Guitar – A Compilation (2003)
- Another Harp Guitar Compilation (2019)

=== Instructional video releases ===
- Harp Guitar Artistry (DVD, 2001)
- Stephen Bennett LIVE! (DVD, 2006)
- Harp Guitar Basics (DVD, 2011)
- Harp Guitar Repertoire (DVD, 2011)
