= Guitar Superstar =

Annual guitar competition in the United States

Guitar Superstar is a yearly competition hosted by the Guitar Player magazine in which 10 finalists compete for the title of Guitar Superstar or Guitar Hero for the year. The competition started in 2005 as the Guitar Hero Competition but was changed in 2008 to the current title, probably to avoid confusion with the Guitar Hero video game series.

== Guitar Hero '05 ==
Held at the Rock and Roll Hall of Fame in Cleveland, Ohio, on June 10, 2005.
Finalists:

- Dominic Frasca (Winner - New York)
- Rodney VerBrugge (First Runner-Up - California)
- Marcus Deml (Second Runner-Up - Germany)
- FINALISTS
- Rob Burton (New York)
- Juan Carlos Coronado (Ontario, Canada)
- Tony Gaglio (New York)
- Ulf Högberg (Sweden)
- Scott Jones (Missouri)
- Sean Kelly (Toronto, Canada)

Judges: Joe Satriani, Steve Lukather, Trevor Lukather, DJ Munch, and Jude Gold.

== Guitar Hero '06 ==
Held at the Great American Music Hall in San Francisco, California, on September 23, 2006.

Finalists:

- Trey Alexander (First Place)
- Patrick Woods (Second Place)
- David Powers (Third Place)
- Joshua Karickhoff
- Joe Cefalu
- Nathan Hahn
- Ed DeGenaro
- Ron LoCurto
- Sergei Roudzinski
- Anton Tsygankov

Judges: Joe Satriani, Steve Lukather, Richie Kotzen, Rafael Moreira, Shredmistress Rynata, and Steve Read.

== Guitar Hero '07 ==
GH07

Held at the Great American Music Hall in San Francisco, California, on October 12, 2007.

Finalists:

- Ladd Smith (Nashville, Tennessee) (First Place)
- Les Robot (real name: Cory Melnychuk) (Edmonton, Alberta) (Second Place)
- Danny B. Harvey (Canyon Country, California) (Third Place)
- Jamie Robinson (Toronto, Ontario)
- Juan Coronado (Whitby, Ontario)
- Tony Smotherman (Jacksonville, Florida)
- Taka Minamino (Hollywood, California)
- Curtis Fornadley (Playa Del Rey, California)
- Casey Harshbarger (Indianapolis, Indiana)
- Chris Peters (Orlando, Florida)

Judges: Joe Satriani, Steve Lukather, Nuno Bettencourt, Elliot Easton, Greg Howe, and Mike Varney.

Host: Brendon Small.

Guitar Hero 06 winner Trey Alexander also came back to battle Guitar Hero III expert Mark Johnson. Johnson played Lay Down by Priestess on GH3 while Alexander played the riffs with his Peavey HP Special.

== Guitar Superstar '08 ==
GH07

Was held at the Great American Music Hall in San Francisco, California, on September 13, 2008.

Finalists:

- Vicki Genfan (Winner)
- Daddo Oreskovich (First Runner-Up)
- Makana (Second Runner-Up)
- Dan Peters
- Eric Barnett
- Mark Orlando
- Christopher Schreiner a.k.a. The Guy

Judges: Joe Satriani, George Lynch, Steve Vai, Elliot Easton and Brendon Small.

Host: Andy Summers

== Guitar Superstar '09 ==
Finalists:

- Steve Senes (Winner)
- Krisz Simonfalvi (First Runner-Up)
- Brian Davidson (Second Runner-Up)
- Dave Benzinger
- Brodie Cumming
- Hercules Castro
- Danny Jones
- Steve Langemo
- Doug Towle
- Jeff Zampillo

Judges: Steve Lukather, Elliot Easton, Jennifer Batten, Earl Slick and Greg Hampton.

Host: Brendon Small

== Guitar Superstar '10 ==
Finalists:

- Don Alder (Winner)
- Eric Clemenzi (First Runner-Up)
- Charlie Crowe (Second Runner-Up)
- Angel Vivaldi
- Dan Kumar
- Jodee Frawlee
- Karim Khorsheed
- Kevin Zugschwert
- Ignacio Di Salvo
- Val Kostadinov

Judges: George Lynch, Elliot Easton, Reeves Gabrels, and Gary Hoey.

Host: Nikki Blakk

== Guitar Superstar '11 ==
Finalists:

- Mark Kroos (Winner)
- Fredrik Strand Halland (First Runner-Up)
- Arek Religa (Second Runner-Up)
- Jeremy Ore
- Forrest Lee, Jr.
- Kevin E. Holdren (Viewer's Choice Winner)

Judges: Muriel Anderson, Carl Verheyen, and Reeves Gabrels.

Host: Larry Carlton
