= Steve Bennett =

Steve or Stephen Bennett may refer to:

== Sports ==
- Stephen Bennett (golfer) (born 1959), English professional golfer
- Steve Bennett (referee) (born 1961), English football referee
- Stephen Bennett (hurler) (born 1995), Irish hurler
- Steven Bennett (footballer) (born 1991), English footballer

== Politicians ==
- Stephen Bennett (Australian politician) (born 1964), Queensland state MP
- Stephen O. Bennett (1807–1886), legislator from Wisconsin
- Steve Bennett (California politician) (born 1950), California state representative

== Others ==
- Stephen James Bennett, English musician and producer
- Stephen Bennett (guitarist) (born 1956), American fingerstyle and harp guitarist
- Steve Bennett, head of Starchaser Industries, a company involved in space development and tourism
- Steve Bennett, manga artist and head of manga publisher Studio Ironcat
- Steve Bennett (software entrepreneur), American businessman
- Steve Bennett (jewelry entrepreneur) (born 1966), founder of several UK shopping channel businesses
- Steven L. Bennett (1946–1972), U.S. pilot posthumously awarded the Medal of Honor
- Steve Bennett, founder of the Chortle website
- Steven Alan Bennett, American attorney, art collector, and philanthropist
