= Harp ukulele =

Ukulele variants

Modern harp ukulele with two harp strings coming from the arm.

The term harp ukulele is used to describe two different variants of the ukulele:

- an ukulele with unfretted strings extending from the body, essentially forming a miniature harp guitar.
- an ukulele with an "arm" extending from the upper bout, often hollow to increase the volume of the sound chamber, which visually resembles a harp guitar but does not support added strings.

== History ==
The harp ukulele appeared in the 1910s, when the harp guitar was experiencing some popularity, and the ukulele had just begun to experience nationwide popularity in the United States due to its use at the Panama–Pacific International Exposition of 1915.

After the popularity of both the harp guitar and ukulele faded, the harp ukulele lost what little market share it had. However, in the late 20th century various luthiers returned to experimenting with the harp ukulele design, both the string-less extended-bout type, as well as the added-strings true harp type.

== Early 20th Century harp ukulele luthiers ==
- Chris Knutsen (Seattle, USA)
