= Luis de Soria Iribarne =

Spanish guitarist and composer (1851–1935)

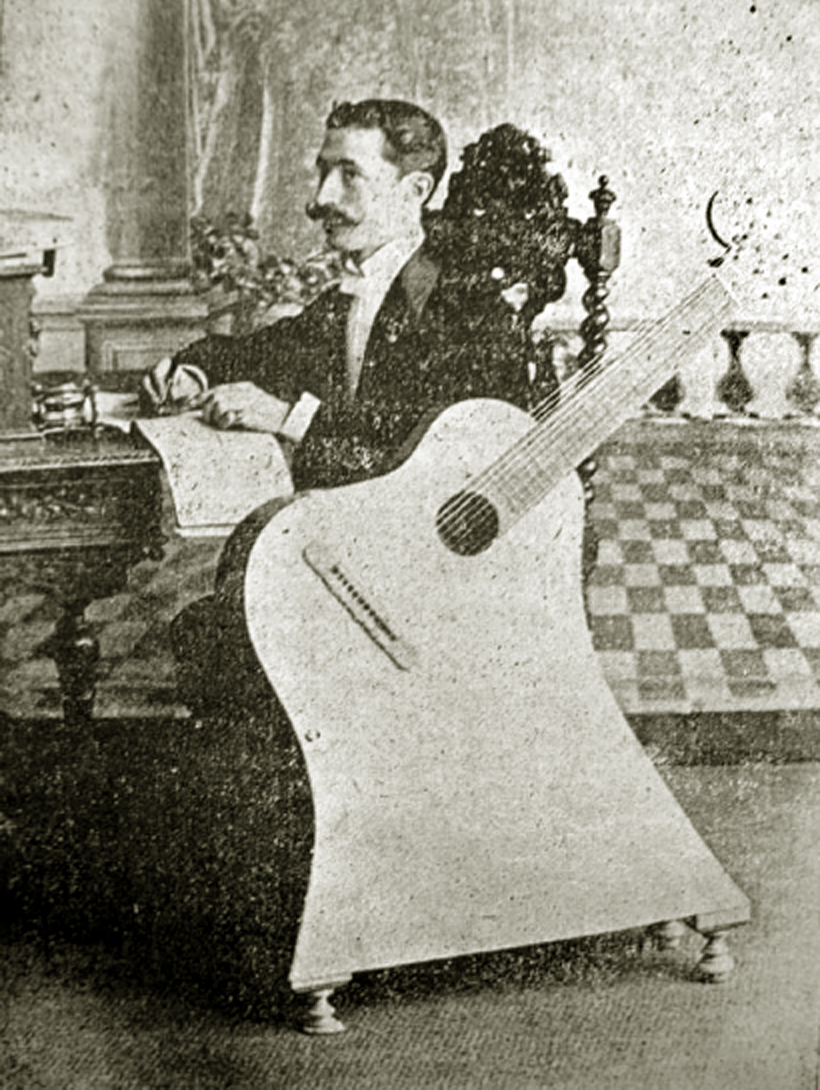
- Luis Soria Iribarne and his "guitarpa"

Background information
- Born: November 21, 1851; Almería, Spain
- Died: 1935 Madrid, Spain
- Occupations: Guitarist, concert performer
- Instruments: Guitar, harp guitar

Luis de Soria Iribarne (Almería, Spain, November 21, 1851 – 1935) was a Spanish guitarist, concert performer, and composer, prominent in the realm of Spanish classical music of the late 19th and early 20th centuries. His work falls within the renaissance of the classical guitar in Spain, and his style combined Romantic influences with elements of Andalusian folklore.

== Life ==
Luis Soria was born in Almería on November 21, 1851. He completed his primary and secondary education in his hometown, later finishing them in Cádiz. From a very young age, he showed a strong interest in music, especially the guitar, an instrument to which he dedicated himself self-taught from the age of nine, despite the initial opposition of his father, who was also a guitarist and musician.

After the death of his father, he had the opportunity to listen to the guitarist Julián Arcas, whose influence was decisive in his musical development. At the age of twenty, he was called up for military service, during which he continued to practice the guitar in his free time.

Upon completion of his service, he moved to French Algeria, where he gave concerts and refined his knowledge of the French language. He later settled in Alicante, where he came into contact with local cultural circles and met the guitarist Francisco Tárrega, with whom he maintained a close professional relationship. They both gave several duo concerts in the region.

Luis Soria developed an extensive career as a concert performer. He performed in numerous cities in Spain, as well as in France, Belgium, the United Kingdom, and other parts of Europe. He also toured America, performing in countries such as Puerto Rico and Cuba. He resided in Havana for five years, where he received recognition from local critics.

During his stay in Cuba, Soria Iribarne designed and built a musical instrument that he called a "guitarpa," a mixture between a guitar and a harp. Two versions of the instrument were created, one with eight strings and the other with eleven.

In 1896, he returned to Spain and continued giving concerts with the guitarpa. In Madrid, he founded the first Spanish Guitar Society. He subsequently continued his concert activities in various locations, including a period in Barcelona in 1905. There, he gave solo recitals and duets with his son, who was also a guitarist.

In addition to his career as a concert performer, Soria actively dedicated himself to teaching the guitar. He worked as a professor in several Spanish cities, including Madrid, San Sebastián, and Gijón. In his later years, he resided in Madrid, where he continued to give private lessons.
