= John Doan =

American guitarist and composer

- Born: May 16, 1951 (age 75); Santa Monica, California, U.S.
- Genres: New-age, classical, Celtic, folk
- Occupations: Musician, composer
- Instruments: Guitar, lute, harp guitar, harpolyre
- Years active: 1974–present
- Labels: Hearts of Space, Narada, Windham Hill, Tapestry
- Website: www.johndoan.com

John Doan (born May 16, 1951) is an American guitarist and composer.

== Background ==
Doan grew up in Venice, California, and at the age of eleven began playing the guitar, first a 12-string, and later a double-neck electric in a rock band. Later, while studying music at California State University, Northridge he was introduced to classical guitar. He really enjoyed the music for the lute and was amazed at the sound of its many strings. Later when he found a century-old harp-guitar on the back wall of a music store, it called to him with its beautiful shape and unusual collection of extra strings. He relates: "I was achingly curious and wanted to transform its silence and neglect into something alive and vibrant. It was and continues to be an adventure to play music on the harp-guitar." After moving to Oregon, Doan earned his master's in musical education from Western Oregon University and served on the faculty there. He studied the renaissance and baroque lute in the Netherlands. Doan's music has a strong classical influence and he also finds inspiration in folk traditions, Irish musical traditions in particular. He is a Professor Emeritus of Music at Willamette University in Salem, Oregon, a historian, and a multi-instrumentalist specializing in unusual vintage instruments. Over the years Doan has played with many folk and country artists, including Donovan, Burl Ives, Larry Carlton, Chet Atkins and Mason Williams.

== Recordings ==
Doan created his own brand of folk-fusion on his first album on Narada, titled Departures (1988). He followed that up with Remembrance: Melodies from a Forgotten Era (1993) on the Tapestry label which was inspired by his own musical traditions in folk tunes of the American West. In the 1990s two television specials were produced by Oregon Public Broadcasting: A Christmas to Remember With John Doan (seen on PBS) and his Emmy nominated A Victorian Christmas With John Doan. The live version of his Victorian Christmas, in which he re-enacts what it might have been like to celebrate Christmas a century ago, has been a holiday tradition for over 30 years. His recording on Hearts of Space, Eire – Isle of the Saints, won "Best Celtic Album of the Year." The Lost Music of Fernando Sor (2008) features the music of Fernando Sor (1778–1839), beloved as the "Father of the Classical Guitar", who composed ten works for the harpolyre, a three-necked, 21 string guitar. Doan discovered and restored a playable instrument from c. 1830 which he used for this recording. Doan's latest video project is a 90-minute documentary that he wrote and starred in titled In Search of the Harp Guitar. John hosted an International Harp Guitar Festival at Willamette University in Salem, Oregon. Doan was recently awarded "World's Leading Harp Guitarist" by the Brand Laureate Awards.

== Discography ==
- Into the Quiet (2016)
- Homage to Fernando Sor (2012)
- Harp Guitars Under the Stars (2010) (with Muriel Anderson)
- A Celtic Pilgrimage (2010)
- The Lost Music of Fernando Sor (2008)
- Wayfarer: Ancient Paths to Sacred Places (1999)
- Eire: Isle of the Saints (A Celtic Odyssey) (1997)
- Wrapped in White: Visions of Christmas Past (1994)
- Remembrance: Melodies from a Forgotten Era (1993)
- Departures (1988)

Compilations

- Brad Hoyt | Together Alone| Duets featuring Piano and Harp Guitar (2009)
- Harp Guitar Dreams (2008)
- Christmas Past: Holiday Harp Guitar Classics (2006)
- Beyond Six Strings (2006)
- Windham Hill: The Renaissance Album (1998)
- Renaissance: A Midsummer Night's Dream
- Celtic Twilight I–V

== DVD ==
- Primal Twang – The Legacy of the Guitar (2010)
- In Search of the Harp Guitar (2006)
- A Celtic Pilgrimage with John Doan (2010)
- John Doan Live in Concert
- John Doan's Two Christmas TV specials
- A Victorian Christmas with John Doan
- A Christmas to Remember with John Doan

== TV ==
- A Christmas to Remember with John Doan
- A Victorian Christmas with John Doan
