= Antoine Dufour =

French-Canadian acoustic guitarist (born 1980)

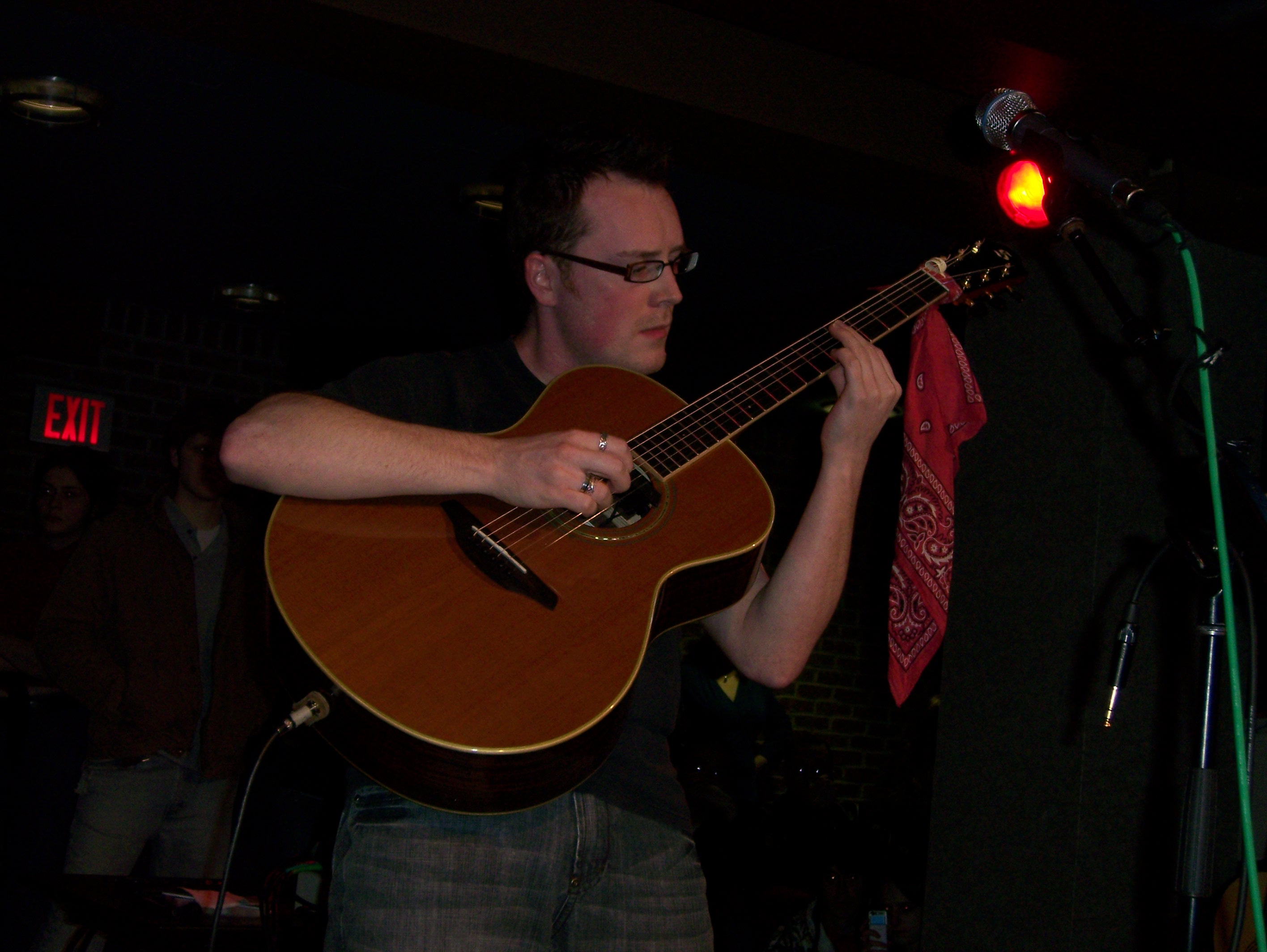
- Dufour performing live in 2008

Background information
- Born: February 18, 1980 (age 46); L'Épiphanie, Quebec, Canada
- Genres: Folk, fingerstyle acoustic, instrumental
- Occupation: Guitarist/Composer
- Instrument: Guitar
- Years active: 2003 – present
- Label: CandyRat
- Website: antoinedufourmusic.com

Antoine Dufour (born February 18, 1980, in L'Épiphanie, Quebec) is a Canadian acoustic guitarist and composer currently signed to CandyRat Records.

Dufour started playing guitar at the age of fifteen. He went on to study at the CEGEP in Joliette, where he listened to the music of Leo Kottke, Don Ross, and Michael Hedges at the behest of his teacher. Since then, he has gone on to place second at the 2005 Canadian Guitar Festival's Fingerstyle Guitar Championship and first place in the 2006 competition. He also placed third at the 2006 International Finger Style Guitar Championship in Winfield, Kansas (Doug Smith was the first-place winner while Don Alder took 2nd place).

Dufour has released five solo albums to date: Naissance, Development, Existence, Convergences, and Sound Pictures. He has garnered a sizeable fanbase through YouTube with live performances of his songs cut in the same studio as fellow guitarist Andy McKee, amongst other CandyRat performers. His most popular video is a cover of "Jerry's Breakdown"] performed with Tommy Gauthier, who is himself an expert fiddler, using a single guitar between the two. Dufour has also released a sixth album (Still Strings) with Tommy Gauthier.

Dufour works on the side as a guitar instructor, offering lessons through Skype as well.

== Guitar style ==
Dufour's pieces are characterized by a highly percussive playing style, using slap and natural harmonics frequently. Dufour shares many compositional traits with other fingerstyle guitarists such as Phil Keaggy, Kaki King, Don Alder, Andy McKee, Craig D'Andrea, and Don Ross, especially in terms of his music's technical complexity.

Many pay special attention to the red bandana/scarf tied around the end of his guitar's neck above the nut, seen in most of Dufour's YouTube videos – he has stated in interviews that this is used to mute the strings ringing above the nut as they would resonate after a hard strum followed by a mute of the strings.

Currently, his primary instrument is a Mario Beauregard flat top "Orchestral model" cutaway. He uses medium Ernie Ball Aluminum Bronze strings, Dimarzio Pickups (Black Angel and Black Angel Piezo), Phil Jones amps, Radial Tonebone Pz-pre preamps, Eventide Space Reverb, Spider capos (previously Third Hand Capos) and an Ergoplay guitar support. On several of his pieces, he plays a Duane Noble Harp guitar. Dufour was previously endorsed by Stonebridge guitars; using his own signature Stonebridge model, in addition to a Stonebridge GS-23-CR. During the period of his first two albums, Dufour used an acoustic Jumbo Larivee in addition to his Stonebridge GS-23-CR.

Dufour wears acrylic artificial fingernails on each finger of his right hand, aside from his thumb. The nails help to create a crisp, clean sound. Regarding these nails, he buys commonly available acrylic nails from a store, and then cuts them down to size. After gluing the nails on, he cuts and files the nails to his preferred length. These fake nails are not worn/glued over the entire fingernail, rather, they are worn on approximately half of the front tip of the nail. Commonly, he uses a Dunlop thumbpick which he files down so that the tip of the pick is shorter and at a more comfortable angle for his playing style. As is commonly seen, Dufour has two rings on his right index and ring finger. These are his wedding and engagement rings. The reason he wears them on his right hand is so that they do not hit the neck of the guitar while he plays. The rings serve no purpose in his playing.

== Discography ==
=== Studio albums ===
- Naissance (2005)
- Development (2006)
- Existence (2008)
- Still Strings (2009) (with Tommy Gauthier)
- Convergences (2010)
- Sound Pictures (2011)
- Back & Forth (2017)
- Reflect (2020)

=== DVDs ===
- Antoine Dufour / Andy McKee Split DVD (2007)
- Antoine Dufour / Craig D'Andrea / Peter Ciluzzi (2008)
