= Italo Meschi =

Italo Meschi (Italian: [ˈiːtalo ˈmɛski]; 9 December 1887 – 15 October 1957) was a harp guitarist from Lucca, Italy.

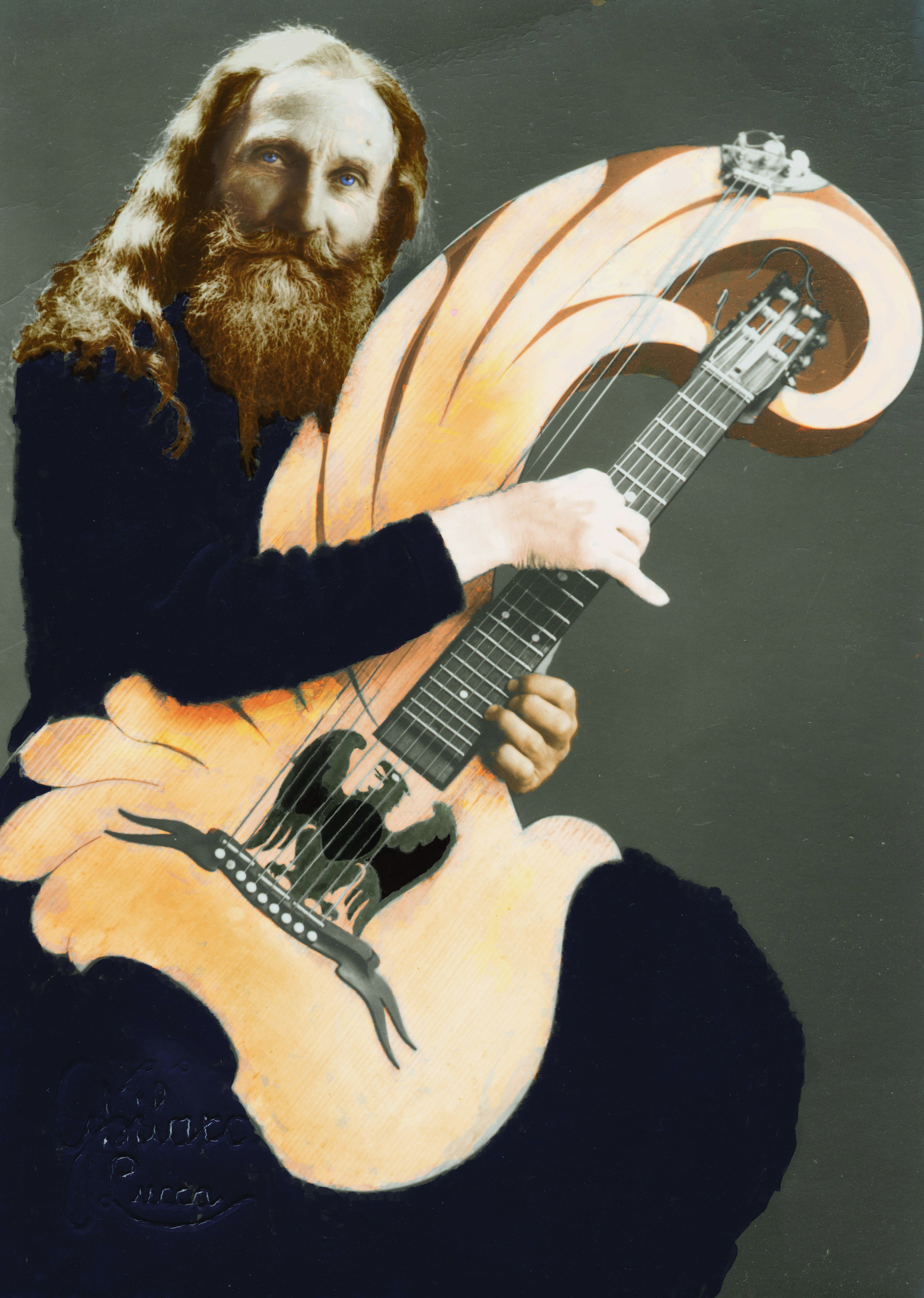
Italo Meschi with his ala d'aquila ("eagle wing") harp guitar

Forty years after his death his long-forgotten trove of writings, compositions, and mementos began to resurface thanks to his closest relatives. Their rediscovery and appreciation by experts places Meschi among the great guitarists of the first half of the 20th century. His repertoire ranges from medieval music, such as the 14th-century piece "Laude alla Vergine", to Wagner, but also includes Tuscan and other European folk songs. He transcribed classical music intended for other instruments for the guitar. He also wrote his own compositions.

Meschi was a near anarchist, pacifist, and nature lover who dressed in linen in summer and winter. A tireless walker, tall and handsome, he wore a beard with long reddish-blond hair, and his bare feet were in Franciscan footwear. The British press of the 1920s described him as "The Last Troubadour". Although he often performed for the best social circles and even for royalty, Meschi never commercialized his music. Proud of his ascetic lifestyle, he settled for a small donation at concerts. "Of the unnecessary, I do not care", he said, and "Musicians should create music also for the poor, in fact, mainly for the poor." A noise and a conversation carried on during his performance were sometimes enough for him to refuse to play again.

== Early life ==
His father Innocenzo Meschi was a tailor and his mother Filomena Bianchi a laundry worker. He had four siblings. He was a good student, but abandoned school after the fifth grade. He received his first musical lessons at the age of six, in the famous institute where G. Puccini and A. Catalani studied; but his parents took him out after the first year. Later he fell in love with the guitar, buying his first instrument at age 14. Around 1903, at age 16, his parents sent him to Lucca's Customs House to work as a porter.

In 1907, he passed the Italian Railways competitive exam becoming a brakeman on the Pisa-Florence line. In 1913, the Railways fired him for absenteeism. That same year Meschi left Italy for California. Official records show he arrived at Ellis Island on 15 September 1913 aboard the SS Rochambeau. He worked at first as a dishwasher in hotels and as a migrant worker in California.

== Later life and career ==
At age 26, "he learned how to read music at the San Francisco Public Library", as stated in an interview with the San Francisco News. Later he began to give concerts. He made his debut at the Arillaga Music College of San Francisco on 19 June 1919. His programme covered Italian vocal music from the 16th, 17th, and 18th centuries.

Toward the end of 1919, he returned to Italy, and in the 1920s he began to tour Europe performing in many cities including Nice, Paris, Brussels, and London. He played his harp guitar throughout the Italian peninsula including a performance in front of King Victor Emmanuel III and Queen Elena at their summer home near Pisa.

In April 1926, Ernest Collins of Collins & Lewis Productions Ltd. engaged Meschi for one year in London. The BBC also hired him for a radio audition. During this stay, he received wide coverage from British media. An article described him as a "strange and picturesque man believed to be the last of the Troubadours". He left London three months later after running into problems with his agent.

Back in Italy, he resumed his concerts in Rome, in Dolomites hotels, on the Italian Riviera, and in Taormina. In his hometown of Lucca, he was at times the guest of Lucca's Mandolin Orchestra. In May 1935, he traveled to Geneva, Switzerland, where he performed for Radio Genève. In Lucca, he lived in a humble one-room flat on top of the Saint Gervasio tower part of the medieval city gate, his only possessions a small table, a chair, a bed, and his inseparable harp guitar or "wooden wife".

On 25 June 1936, Italo Meschi returned to the United States for his third and last time. In 1937, Gaetano Merola, conductor and founder of the San Francisco Opera wrote: "Apparently Mr. Meschi has artistic attributes quite as impressive as his appearance. I enjoyed immensely Mr. Meschi's playing and singing. His interpretation of the Italian classics of the seventeenth and eighteenth centuries was a revelation to me."

That same year, music critic Alfred Frankenstein wrote on the San Francisco Chronicle: "Meschi is a picturesque artist. He plays a guitar that looks like a wing of the rock that carried Sinbad on its back. He has the beard and head of a Greek orthodox priest and the simplicity of a child. The first part of the programme was devoted mostly to old Italian songs and arias, hauntingly beautiful things rendered still finer by this troubadour's full, sonorous voice and reverent manner."

The Immigration and Naturalization Service did not extend Meschi's visa past 29 May 1937. He always referred to his departure as an "extradition". In retrospect, the visa extension denial may have gone well beyond the anti-immigration laws of that period. His unusual appearance and libertarianism may have led to the decision. His having held "more rallies than concerts" when he received the "extradition order" may have been the root of the problem. According to a written eyewitness account, "the day after his last concert in San Francisco, thugs attacked him tearing to pieces his guitar".

Back in Italy, Italo Meschi ran into problems with the fascist authorities, including a documented failure to report at the headquarters of the regional fascist group. For years, he had been a member of a socioeconomic project known as "Hallesism". Based on mathematical postulates, Hallesism favoured a new system for regulating international trade (regulating it equitably and efficiently for the benefit of the entire world community). The fascist regime eventually confined its leader Agostino Trucco to a mental institution where he died in 1940.

At the onset of World War II, Meschi withdrew to a humble stone cottage on the foothills of the Apuan mountains north of Lucca. There he worked the land, tended sheep, and wrote poetry. His poems carry a message against war, greed, environmental degradation, moral, and cultural disorientation. Many also deal with an unfulfilled love.

In 1948, he played the part of Nicodemus in the Italian religious movie Il Volto Santo (The Holy Face). Among his last performances, before his final illness, is the one of 25 October 1954 at the Teatro dell'Arte al Parco in Milan, broadcast by the RAI Italian television network.

He died of a lung ailment and in poverty at age 70 in the village of Carignano near Lucca.

== Technique ==
Guitar maker Bruno Mattei built Meschi's first two harp guitars. Years later he performed with a harp guitar named Ala d'Aquila ("Eagle Wing"). As told by Meschi himself, it was built specifically for him by Luigi Mozzani and bought in March 1924 in Cento near Ferrara. His great skill, next to his instrumental skill, was his unique vocal ability, a voice that matched the originality of his repertoire. His baritone voice rose well beyond its natural texture. Meschi had a thin but "penetrating and persuasive" voice, a modular voice considering the rigor of sixteenth century arias, the great verve, and force of the Tuscan stornelli (folk songs) or of the mountain folk songs he picked up during his wandering and so loved to perform.

The Dictionary of Italian Guitarists and Lute-Makers (1937, Benvenuto Terzi & others) states: "He displays grace, exquisite taste, and perfect technique. His guitar emits unheard harmonious sounds. He is a remarkable artist, one of a kind. In the hands of this unique artist, the guitar unveils unimaginable notes and shades. He impresses the public with his pleasant, warm, and always measured voice. However, what reveals his interpretative, instrumental, and vocal arts are Italian folk songs, where he remains unchallenged."

== Repertoire ==
The American record company Brunswick Records made two recordings of Italo Meschi's New York concert of 6 June 1929. On the first he played Notturno (probably by Giovanni Navone) and Francisco Tarrega's Tango. On the second he sang Stornellata Romana and Questa Mattina (This Morning). Also in June 1929, Gennett Records of New York recorded another song, La Indita.

At his concerts, Meschi also played a Beethoven aria, a nocturne, a rhapsody (Souvenir de St. Paul) by Giovanni Domenico Navone, an Andalusian fandango, some Sor studies, Luciano Castagna's Serenata, etc. He performed pieces from the 16th and 17th centuries by A. Falconieri, C. Monteverdi, and R. Rontani.

He also composed his own pieces. His works included two lullabies, Melanconie" and "Partenza and three pieces based on poems by Giovanni Pascoli,"La Poesia", "Il Brivido", and "La Mia Sera".

Meschi loved Bach's polyphony. He spent much of his time transcribing pieces before playing them at concerts with his harp guitar. A dozen of his manuscripts have recently been found including a 1948 transcription of Bach's famous Toccata and Fugue in D minor BWV 565 for organ. It is unclear which Bach music Meschi interpreted in his concerts. However, postwar years' evidence suggests the challenge of mastering such difficult pieces on the harp guitar had become for him almost an obsession. The Italo Meschi archive resides at the Banca del Monte di Lucca.

== Personal life ==
Italo Meschi never married. "Admired and coveted by many beautiful women, yet always absorbed in his musical environment, he valued them precious little", wrote his brother Mario. During the war years, at age 56, he fell in love with a younger woman with a long and inconclusive relationship.

He was a vegetarian who left behind recipes and recommendations for food deficiencies. As an early environmentalist, he laid out a plan on how to make his town livable.

In Lucca, people referred to him as the "Christ" for his long thick beard and Nazarene-style hair. Devout in his own way, he had disagreements with the Church. To honour his art, locals called him "Maestro Italo".

In October 1957, a day after his death, the daily La Nazione referred to his "sincere and incorruptible spirit which did not allow bending to the demands of our modern consumer society". "Therein lies the commercial handicap", had written, three decades earlier, British author Constance Vaughan in her article "The Last of the Troubadours", after having interviewed Maestro Italo.

== Sources ==
- Constance Vaughan, The Last of the Troubadours, Daily Sketch, London 16 July 1926.
- Alfredo Bonaccorsi, Canti toscani (Tuscan Songs), in Comoedia, year XVI, 15 April-15 May 1929, p. 33-34.
- Alfred Frankenstein, Pianist Italian Bard Give Initial Sunday Recitals, San Francisco Chronicle, January 4, 1937.
- Alfredo Bonaccorsi, Cinque melodie popolari, in “Musica d’Oggi”, XXII, n. 6, 1940, p. 160-163.
- Il Cronista Errante (The Wandering Chronicler) Vite, avventure e confessioni della più ricca barba di Lucchesia, (Life, adventures, and secrets of Lucca's most beautiful beard), unsigned, in “II Mattino dell'Italia Centrale” (newspaper for central Italy), Friday September 26, 1951.
- Alfredo Bonaccorsi, Il folklore musicale in Toscana, (Tuscany's Musical Folklore), Florence : L. S. Olschki, 1956, p. 148-49.
- Carlo Carfagna, – Mario Gangi, Dizionario chitarristico italiano, (Italian Guitar Dictionary) Ancona : Berben, 1968, 97 p. (The entry Italo Meschi is at page 45).
- Guglielmo Lera, Italo Meschi – Lucchese geniale, (Italo Meschi, Lucca's brilliant artist), p. 15-16, unknown edition, undated (but surely written after 1957).
- Guglielmo Lera, "Un musicista," (A Musician) in “La Provincia di Lucca”, April–June 1973, XIII, n. 2, p. 100-106.
- Riccardo Marasco, Chi cerca trova. Vita e canti di Toscana, (Who seeks finds. Lives and songs of Tuscany) Florence: Birba, 1977, 191 p. (The chapter about I. Meschi is at pages 57–71).
- Laura Bedini, edited by, “Italo Meschi Cantore della Terra Lucchese – Poesie, riflessioni, testimonianze”, Istituto Storico della Resistenza e dell’Età Contemporanea di Lucca, (Italo Meschi, Lucca's Singer – Poems, writings, accounts published by Lucca's Modern History Institute), Nero su bianco : Lucca, 1993, 95 p.
- Gregg Miner, Riccardo Sarti, Italo Meschi, the Last Italian Troubadour) http://harpguitars.net/players/italo/italo.htm, October 2005 – Updated October, 2010.
- Romolo Ferrari e la chitarra in Italia nella prima metà del Novecento (Romolo Ferrari and Italian guitar in the first half of the 20th century), edited by Simona Boni, Modena: Mucchi, 2009. It contains information about Italo Meschi at pages 19, 109, 232, 306, 308.
- Marco Bazzotti, Tista Meschi, Italo Meschi chitarrista e cantore. 30 brani per chitarra sola, canto e chitarra, edited by T. Meschi, M. Bazzotti (Lucca's Academy of Arts and Sciences: Italo Meschi, guitar player and singer. Thirty pieces for solo guitar, song and guitar), 2011 (Maria Pacini Fazzi Editore).
- Musica.in.cucina / Italo.Meschi (Music in the kitchen), edited by Tista Meschi, Pacini Fazzi : Lucca, 2011, 32 p.
- Tista Meschi, Riccardo Sarti, The Last Troubadour, Italo Meschi, 2017 (CreateSpace, an Amazon Company).
