= Harp guitar =

Guitar-based string instrument

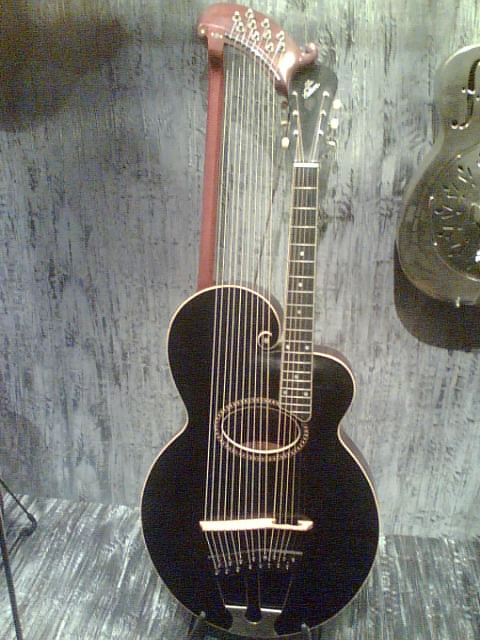
- Gibson Style U, c. 1911.
- Classification: String instrument (plucked)
- Hornbostel–Sachs classification: 321.322 (plucked)
- Developed: 19th century
- Attack: Fast
- Decay: Slow

Related instruments
- Steel-string acoustic guitar; Classical guitar

Musicians
- List: Don Alder; Muriel Anderson; John Doan; Antoine Dufour; Andy McKee; Jimmy Page; Matt Thomas

Builders
- Gibson

The harp guitar is a guitar-based stringed instrument generally defined as a "guitar, in any of its accepted forms, with any number of additional unstopped strings that can accommodate individual plucking." The word "harp" is used in reference to its harp-like unstopped open strings. A harp guitar must have at least one unfretted string lying off the main fretboard, typically played as an open string.

This family consists of many varieties of instrument configurations. Most readily identified are American harp guitars with either hollow arms, double necks or harp-like frames for supporting extra bass strings, and European bass guitars (or contraguitars). Other harp guitars feature treble or mid-range floating strings, or various combinations of multiple floating string banks along with a standard guitar neck.

== Electric harp guitars ==
While most players of harp guitars play on acoustic instruments, a few of them also work with electric instruments. Notable artists who played electric harp guitars are Tim Donahue (who uses a fretless guitar section) and Michael Hedges. American musician William Eaton both designs and plays electric harp guitars. The Japanese noise band Solmania built their own harp guitars. Yuri Landman has built a 17 string electric harp guitar for Finn Andrews of The Veils. The instrument has an additional movable bridge on the harp section allowing players to pitch the harp section higher or lower.

== Players ==
Historical harp guitar players include Polish guitarist-virtuoso Marek Konrad Sokołowski (1818-1884), the German composers and guitarists Adam Darr (1811–1866) and Eduard Bayer (1822–1908) and the Italian virtuosi Pasquale Taraffo (1887–1937), Mario Maccaferri, Italo Meschi (1887-1957) and Luigi Mozzani. Viennese and French virtuosos who often played instruments with extra, floating bass strings include Carulli, Coste, Giuliani, Mertz, Padovec and Sor.

English guitarist John McLaughlin notably played a harp guitar, particularly with the group Shakti, often using the harp strings for Indian-inspired drones and open chords. Michael Hedges was known for occasionally using a 1920s-era harp guitar, such as in his song "Because It's There".

Andy McKee also plays a harp guitar in a few of his songs, such as "Into The Ocean" and "The Friend I Never Met," the latter being a tribute to Hedges' "Because It's There." Robbie Robertson of The Band used a harp guitar on the main title theme for their concert film The Last Waltz and is seen playing the song on the instrument in the film's final scene. Don Alder uses the Harp guitar in songs such as "Sayonara.calm" and "Man from Ladylane" a song dedicated to Stephen Bennett, founder of the Harp Guitar Gathering and one of the top current day harp guitar players. Antoine Dufour also uses the instrument occasionally, such as in his song "Paroxysm".

Oleg Timofeyev primarily uses a traditional Russian seven-string guitar with floating sub-bass strings. American harp-guitarist Gregg Miner owns the world's largest collection of harp guitars ("The Miner Museum") and runs harpguitars.net, a website dedicated to education and promotion of harp guitars. Alongside Stephen Bennett, he has organized, attended and documented every Harp Guitar Gathering since its inception.

Alfred Karnes (1891–1958) was an Old-time Country and Southern Gospel singer and guitarist who recorded at the famous Bristol Sessions in 1927. He was known for songs such as "I'm Bound for the Promised Land" and "To the Work". His records are the only known use of the harp-guitar in Old Time Music.

(in alphabetical order)

- Alex Anderson
- Don Alder
- Muriel Anderson
- Steve Bennett
- Jason Carter
- Neil G. Christian
- Luis de Soria Iribarne
- John Doan
- Tim Donahue
- Antoine Dufour
- Jamie Dupuis
- Beppe Gambetta
- Michael Hedges
- Ali Deniz Kardelen
- Kaki King
- David Lindley
- Andy McKee
- John McLaughlin
- Gregg Miner
- Jeff Martin
- Jimmy Page
- David Powell
- Robbie Robertson
- Tom Shinness
- Matt Thomas
- Iwan Hasan
- Andy Wahlberg
- Jake Kiszka

== Gallery ==
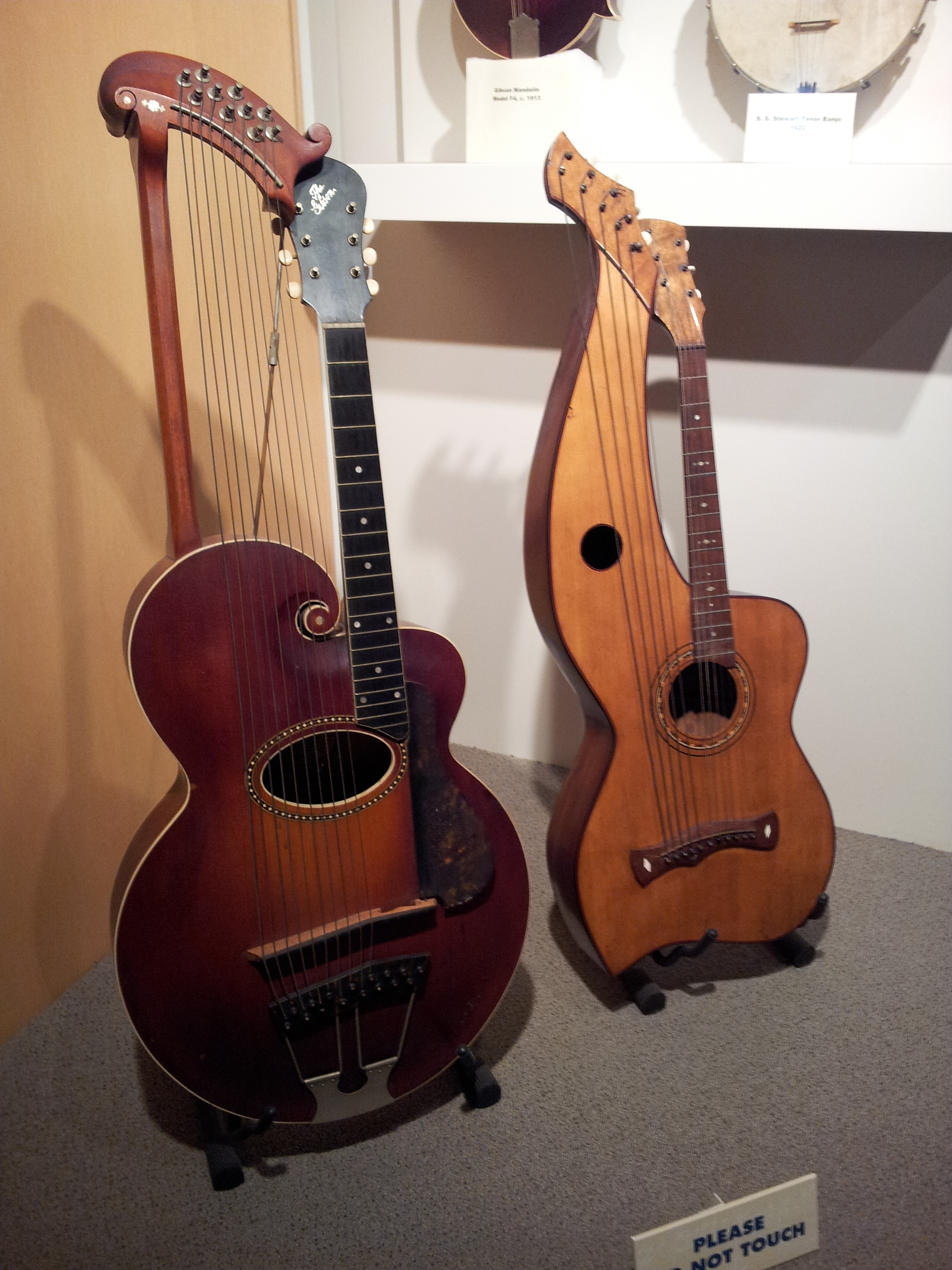
Early 20th. Century harp guitars with a Gibson at left.

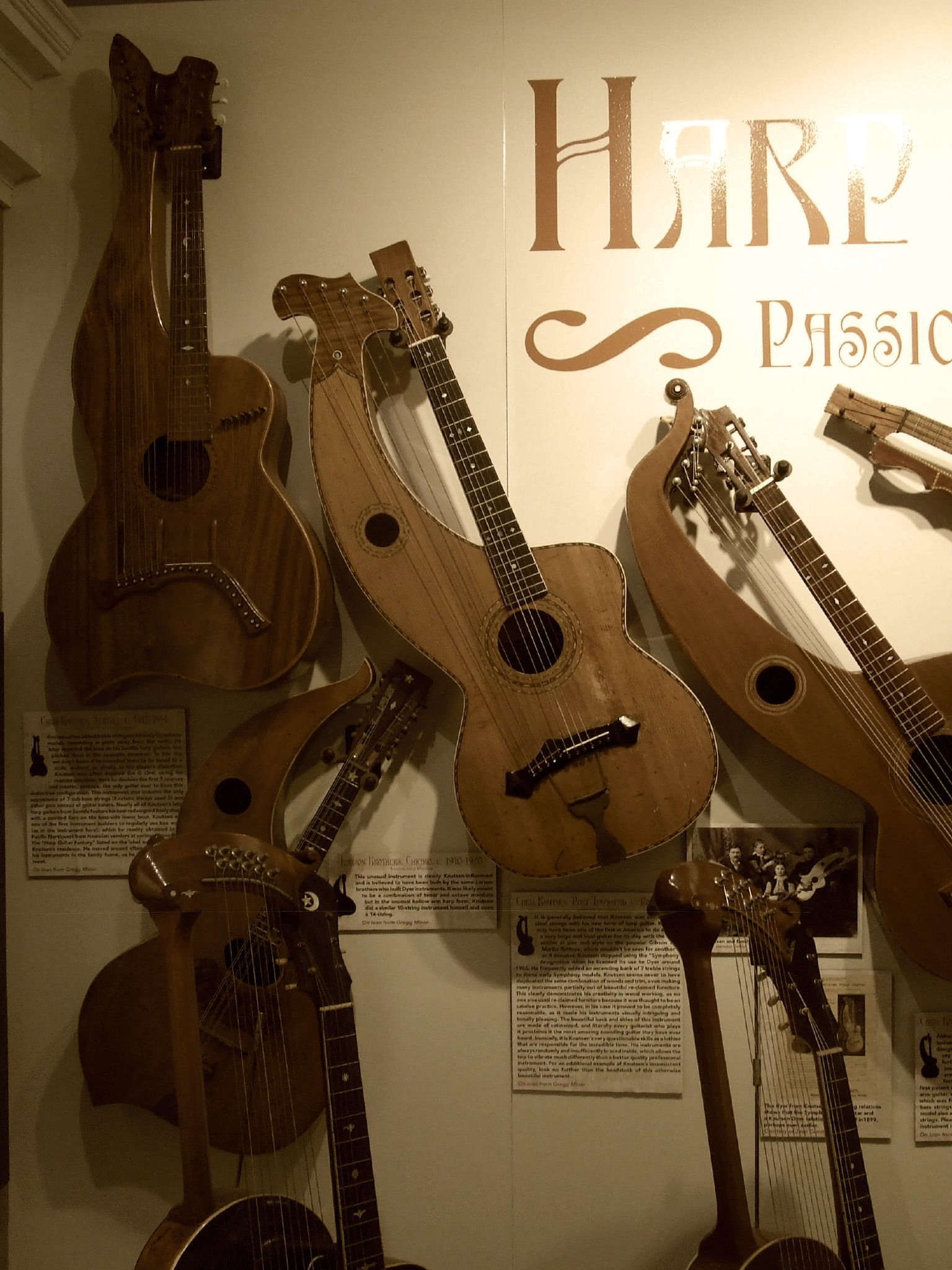
Harp guitars at the Museum of Making Music.

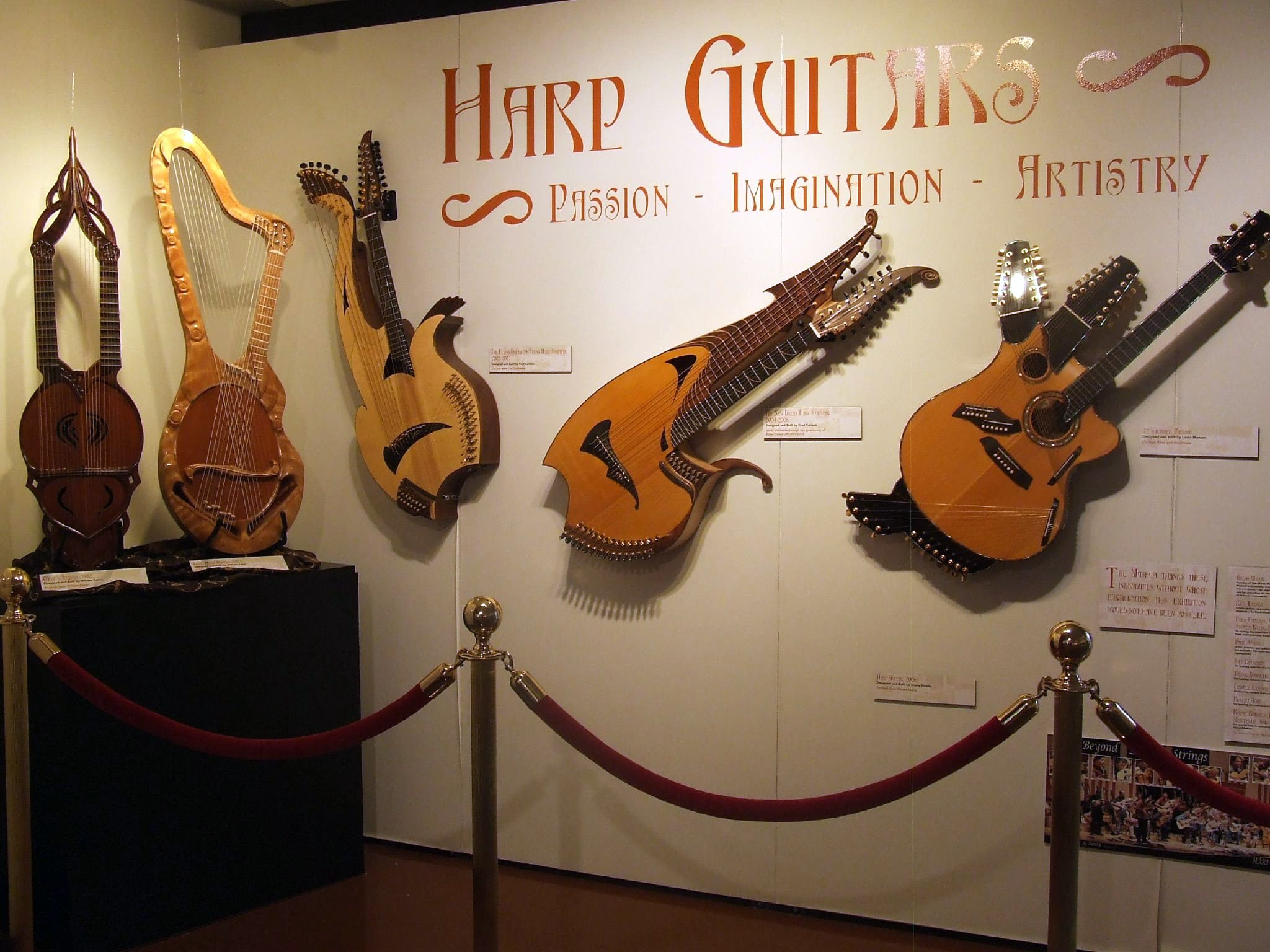
Several models exhibited.

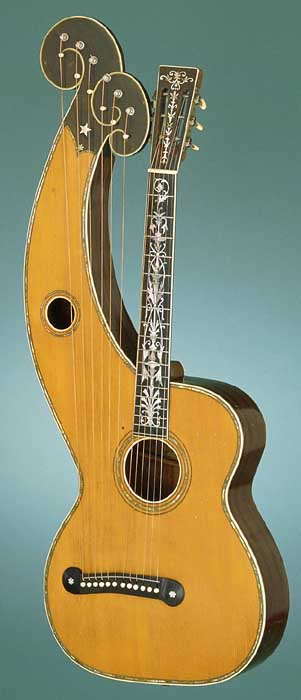
A Dyer Style 8, circa 1915.

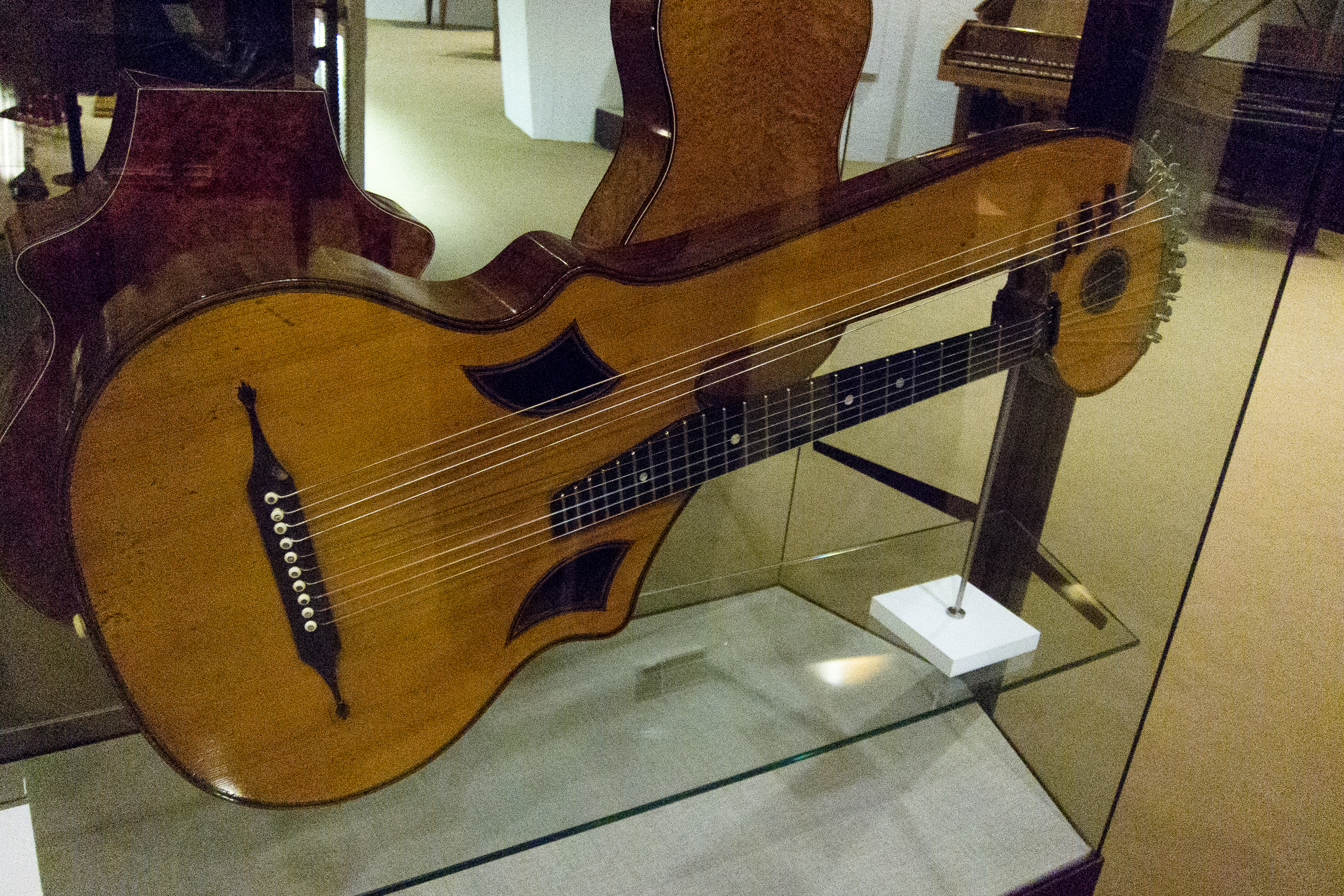
Harp guitar exhibited at Berlin.

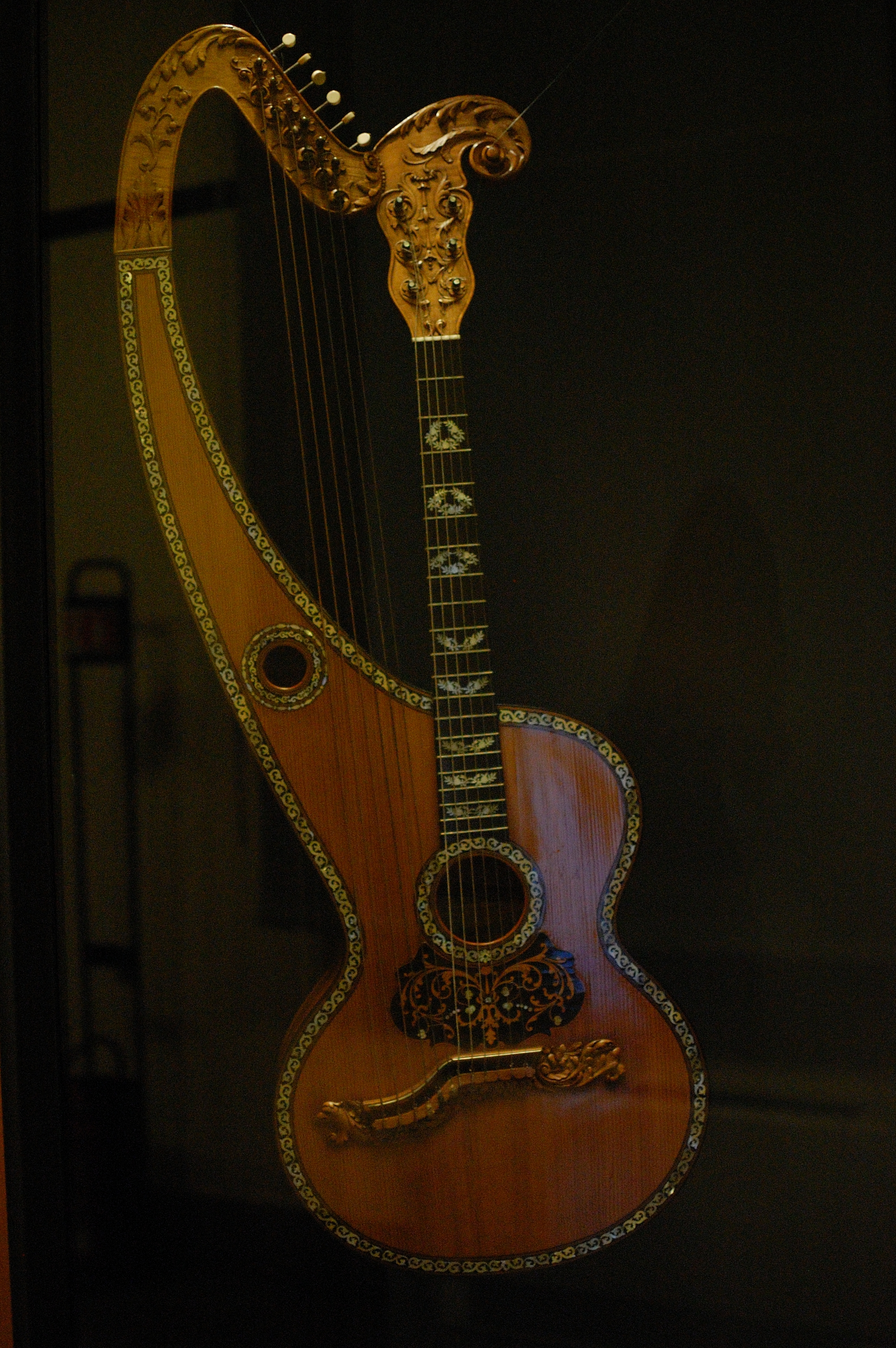
Model by Severino Riva (1911).

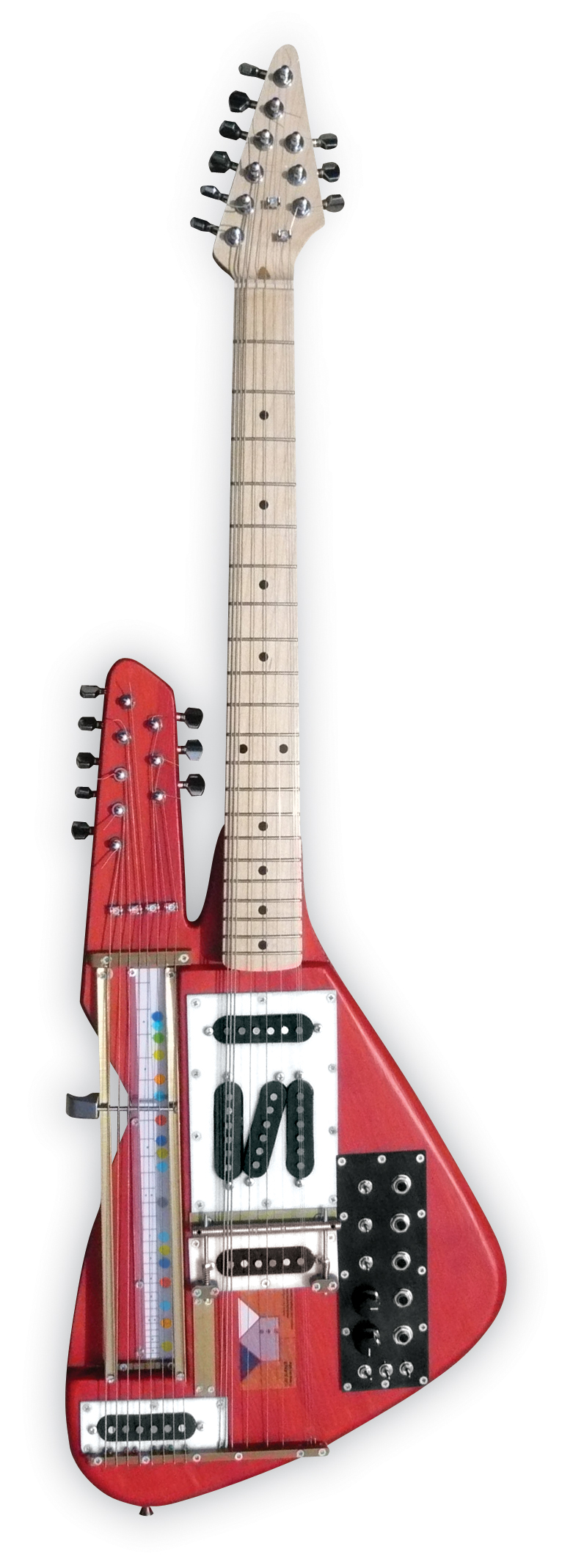
Finn Andrews' electric.

== See also ==
- Archlute
- Extended-range classical guitar
- Alto guitar
- Lyre-guitar
- Theorbo
- Swedish lute
- Harp ukulele
- Bandura
- Kobza
- Combolin
- Chris Knutsen, early harp guitar luthier
- Pikasso guitar
