= Eduard Bayer =

German composer and guitarist

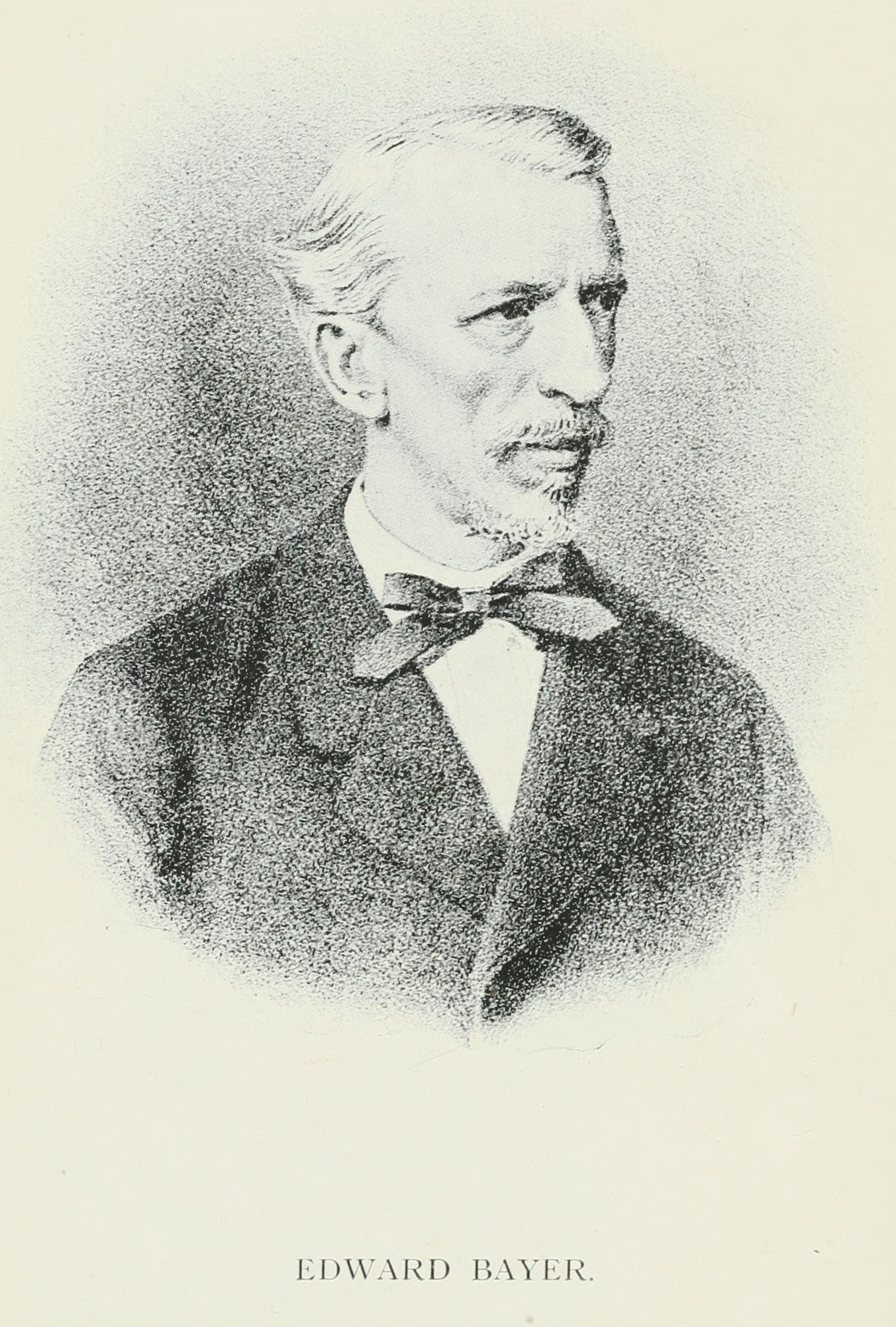
Eduard-Bayer from'The-Guitar-and-Mandolin' 1914

Johann Gottfried Eduard Bayer (20 March 1822 – 23 March 1908), usually known as Eduard Bayer, was a German composer for the classical guitar and a virtuoso performer on the guitar, harp guitar, mandolin and zither.

== Biography ==
Bayer was born in Augsburg. He was the son of a civil servant who died early. At age six, he became a member of the boys choir at the local St. Ulrich's church. In his youth, he was employed as an engraver and worked for the company for six years. A local municipal official named W. Schmölzl introduced him to the guitar, giving him scores and tuition materials from Sor, Giuliani, Legnani, and Mertz. He gained such proficiency that by around 1843, he could give up his engraver's job and become a professional guitarist. In 1848, after a number of successful recitals in his hometown, he set out on a tour through Germany together with a certain Loe, one of his most talented pupils. Apparently, they were not successful and on the brink of returning home when at Darmstadt, their fate turned: "Having to pass through Darmstadt on their journey they were quite unexpectedly commanded to play before the court and they received genuine and hearty applause from the Hereditary Grand Duke and Duchess, the latter being a daughter of King Ludwig of Bavaria. Being now provided with weighty recommendations, they left the town which had provided them with such a pleasant surprise and from this time their success was assured."

He later travelled through many musical centres in Germany including Dresden and Leipzig and also through the Netherlands, Belgium and Switzerland. After two years of travelling, he ended up in Hamburg in 1850, although he continued touring until 1857. For some of his publications, he used the pseudonym "A. Caroli", for example for his guitar method Vollständige Guitarreschule and his two collections of short pieces called Esmeralda. One of his most prominent pupils was Otto Hammerer (1834–1905).

Bayer wrote mainly for the salon or for domestic entertainment. Among his numerous compositions are collections of 100 Erholungen ("recreations"), 21 volumes of Der Guitarrist im Salon ("the guitarist in the salon"), and 10 volumes of Musikalischer Blumenstraus ("musical bouquet"). In spite of his international tours and his method being translated into English and French, Bone (1914) wrote "Bayer is held in the highest estimation as a composer by his countrymen, but he is practically unknown out of Germany".

He also composed songs for voice and guitar (mainly excerpts from popular operas), also some music for the zither and a fantasy for guitar and piano. He frequently performed on a harp guitar and was the inventor of a pedal harp guitar that was able to move a capodaster up and down the neck with the help of a foot pedal. Bayer died in Hamburg.

== Selected compositions ==
Guitar solo

- Fleurs du bal. Collection de quadrilles, valses, polka etc. sur des thèmes des opéras italiens, Op. 2 (Hamburg: Niemeyer, c.1850)
- Le Repertoire du guitarriste. Morceaux modernes et non difficiles (Hamburg/Leipzig/New York: Schuberth & Co., c.1860). 15 volumes. Contains, e.g.: vol. 1: Fantaisie sur le chant Les Plus beaux yeux, Op. 17 (after Stigelli) – score online; vol. 4: Die Heimath, Op. 20 (on the song by Karl August Krebs) – score online
- Souvenir d'amour. Fantaisie pour la guitare à 10 ou 6 cordes, Op. 22 (Leipzig: Carl Rühle, c.1890) – see 'External links' below
- Grand rondo brillant, Op. 40 (Leipzig: Carl Rühle, c.1860)
- Echo musical. Collection de compositions les plus nouveaux et favorites (Hamburg: Jowien, c.1890)
- Compositions pour la guitare (4 volumes; Leipzig: Carl Rühle, not dated)
- Divertissement (Hamburg: Bayer, n. d.)

Guitar duo

- Souvenir d'Ems. 6 Ländler, Op. 23 (Hamburg: Niemeyer, c.1850) - score online
- Sechs Ländler, Op. 37 (Offenbach: André, c.1855) – score online

Guitar and piano

- Erinnerung an Hamburg. Fantasy (1856)

Voice and guitar

- Bayer's Liederschatz für Guitarre. Eine Auswahl der beliebtesten Lieder und Opern-Gesänge mit leichter Gitarrebegleitung. Vol. 1: Franz Schubert (Pasing nr. Munich: Hoenes, c.1900). Contains: "Das Wandern"; "Der Neugierige"; "Wohin?"; "Ungeduld"; "Morgengruss"; "Mit dem grünen Lautenbande"; "Mein"; "Des Müllers Blumen"; "Thränenregen"; "Danksagung an den Bach"; "Am Feierabend"; "Trock'ne Blumen"; "Der Müller und der Bach"; "Des Baches Wiegenlied"; "Erlkönig"; "Leise flehen meine Lieder"; "Der Wanderer"; "Lob der Thränen"; "Am Meer"; "Horch, horch, die Lerch im Aetherblau"; "Ave Maria".
- dto., vol. 2: Conradin Kreutzer
- dto., vol. 3: Albert Lortzing
- dto., vol. 4: Mendelssohn-Bartholdy
- dto., vol. 5: Curschmann, Chopin, Nicolai

Zither

- Tanz-Album für Zitherspieler (Hamburg, 1880)
- Neueste theoretisch-praktische Zitherschule, bei Mangel eines Lehrers auch für den Selbstunterricht berechnet mit melodischen Übungs- und Unterhaltungs-Stücken (Trier: P. Ed. Hoenes, c.1885). English edition as The Latest Theoretical and Practical Zither-School, containing melodious exercises and amusements, translated by Mrs. J. P. Morgan (same publisher, same year).
- Schule der Geläufigkeit für die Zither (Trier: P. Ed. Hoenes, 1886)

== Bibliography ==
- Philip J. Bone: The Guitar and Mandolin. Biographies of Celebrated Players and Composers for these Instruments (London: Schott & Co. and Augener Ltd., 1914), p. 23-25.
- Josef Zuth: Handbuch der Gitarre und Laute (Vienna: Anton Goll, 1928; reprinted Hildesheim: Georg Olms Verlag, 1972).
