= Nikki Blakk =

American radio DJ (born 1972)

Nikki Blakk (born November 7, 1972) is an American radio DJ, who pioneered San Francisco Bay Area's rock radio station, 107.7 The Bone as an intern in 2000, spending a collective 15 years with the station in various positions including Weekends, Afternoons, Nights and Assistant Program Director. Blakk was also host and programmer of the station's heavy and extreme metal specialty show called "The Metal Zone".

== Radio career ==
Blakk began her career as an intern at KSAN, a precursor to 107.7 The Bone, working in promotions and marketing. Immediately after, she went to KNBR in San Francisco and became a production assistant, call screener and board op for the next year and a half while finishing college.

She was hired at Rock 96.7, a Clear Channel station in Modesto, California, as a weekend personality, then midday host. Her first audition shift as full-time DJ was on September 11, 2001, board-oping the news all day then going live the next day, which was a challenge that she handled well and was subsequently hired as their midday on-air personality. In 2002 Blakk began Weekends at sister station KSJO and shortly after became their evening host. On October 28, 2004 KSJO flipped to Spanish. In 2005 Nikki Blakk began evenings at 101.7 The Fox in Santa Rosa, until returning to 107.7 The Bone full time in 2006, where she held several positions including Weekends, Afternoons, Nights and Assistant Program Director. In 2012 Nikki Blakk was profiled by Bay Area Radio Hall of Famer and former Rolling Stone writer, Ben Fong Torres. Blakk quit in 2015 and returned to radio on 107.7 The Bone for 3 years in 2022.

== Metal Zone ==
At KSJO, Nikki started a metal program originally called Hardcore Hell, later rebranded Midnight Metal 12 am – 1 am airing Wednesday through Friday nights. After coming to The Bone, Nikki was a natural to take over the Metal Zone from Billy Steel when he left the station in summer of 2006. The program aired from 10 pm-1 am Friday nights and featured extreme music with special emphasis on local artists. The Metal Zone was canceled after Blakk's resignation in 2015. Live 365, an internet radio company rebranded the 24-hour heavy metal channel "Nikki Blakk's Metal Zone" programmed and hosted by Nikki Blakk, which ended when the company went out of business in December 2015. The Metal Zone was resurrected after Blakk's return in 2022, Saturday Nights from 11pm-midnight. The Metal Zone was shelved again when Blakk was laid off by Cumulus in December 2025.

== Monsters of Rock Cruise ==
In 2013 Nikki Blakk was a passenger on the Monsters of Rock Cruise, where cruise organizer Larry Morand brought her on as a host for all subsequent cruises. Nikki Blakk was included in the spin off 'Monsters on the Mountain Festival', beginning in 2022, rebranded 'The Mountain Festival'

== Personal life ==
Nikki Blakk also has a simultaneous career as backstage manager and production runner at LiveNation, formerly [[Bill Graham Presents and other local promoters. In 2022, Blakk served as Road Manager for Rock n Roll Hall of Fame legend, Jackson Browne. ]]

Nikki has also been voted one of the Top 50 Hottest Women in Radio for 2009, 2010 and 2011, according to Pop Crunch.

She has been involved in the Greater Bay Area Make-A-Wish Foundation and the Guitar Player Magazine Guitar Superstar contest.
