= Chris Knutsen =

American luthier

Chris Knutsen (June 24, 1862 – November 6, 1930) was an American luthier of the early 20th century, primarily known for his Hawaiian guitars and harp guitars.

== Biography ==
Johan Christian Kammen was born in Norway, the third child and second son of Ole Ferdinand Kammen and his wife, Birgette Skancke. He moved to Minnesota at age 3 with his parents in 1865. His first marriage to Ida Yahr, was recorded at Milnor Lutheran Church in Dakota Territory during November 1887. Subsequently, in 1888 he was married to his first cousin, Anna Cammen. They moved to Washington state in 1895, where he began patenting unusual guitar designs.

Knutsen started building Hawaiian steel guitars as early as 1908. Most of the guitars produced by Knutsen have spruce tops, all have lateral or diagonal bracing on the back, also due to his eccentric building skills many of his guitars used some crude solutions such as: wide number of screws, brackets, wing nuts, sheared-off tuning machine plates, odd-shaped nuts and dressmaker's seam tape rather than wood strips to reinforce ribs and butt fitted back plates.

Around 1914 he moved to Los Angeles, just as the Panama-California International Exposition ignited the Hawaiian music craze in the mainland United States. Accordingly, Knutsen began to produce harp ukuleles and Hawaiian guitars to meet the new demand.
