= Muriel Anderson =

American guitarist (born 1960)

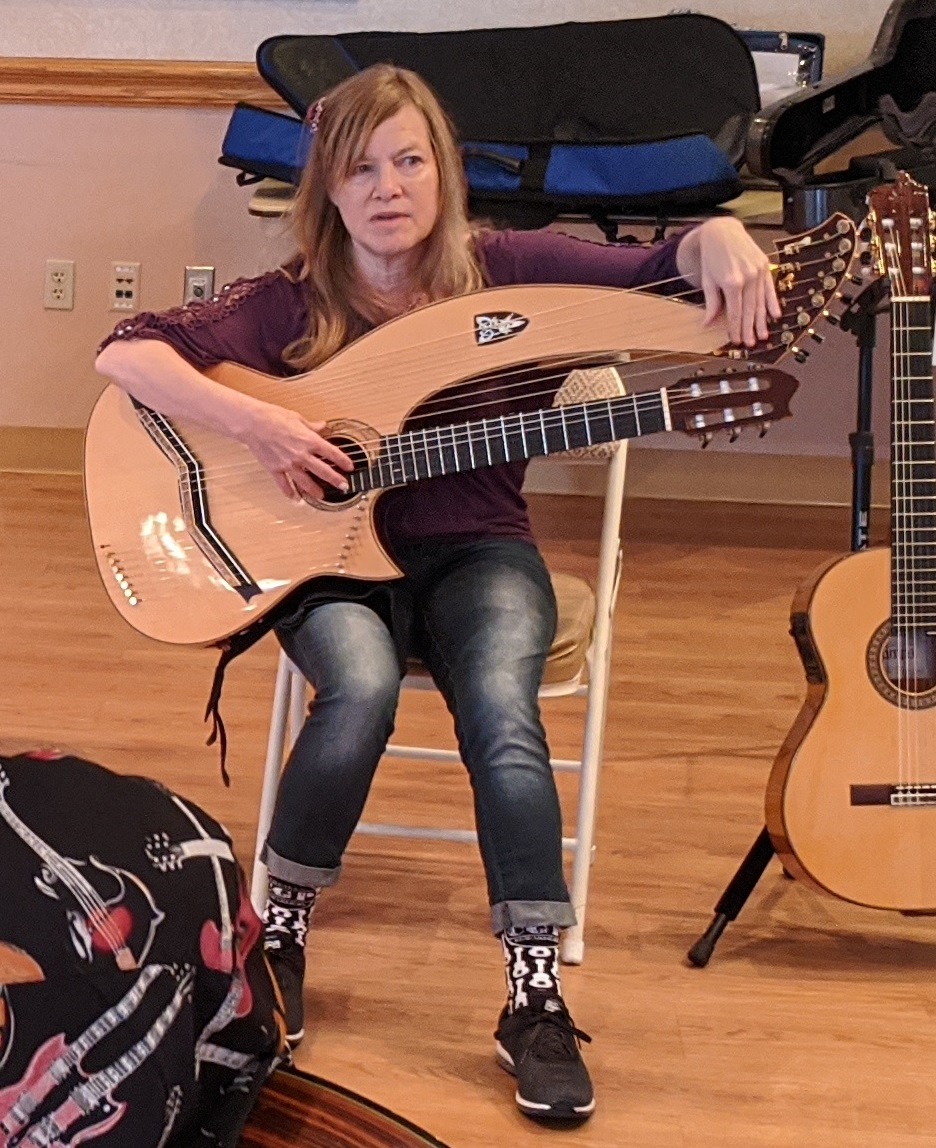
- American harp guitarist, conducting a guitar clinic in The Villages, Florida in 2020.

Background information
- Born: June 17, 1960 (age 66); Downers Grove, Illinois, U.S.
- Genres: Classical, folk, bluegrass, flamenco, pop
- Occupation: Musician
- Instruments: Guitar, harp-guitar
- Years active: 1989–present
- Label: CGD
- Website: murielanderson.com

Muriel Anderson (born June 17, 1960) is an American fingerstyle guitarist and harp guitarist who plays in many genres. She is the first woman to win the National Fingerpicking Guitar Championship.

== Career ==
Muriel Anderson was born in Downers Grove, Illinois, and is of Finnish descent: her great-grandparents emigrated to the United States from Finland. Her grandfather played saxophone in the John Philip Sousa band. She learned piano as a child. When she was eight, she was given a guitar by a family friend who was going to throw it away. In her early teens, she took lessons at Old Town School of Folk Music in Chicago. In high school she was a member of the jazz band and helped form a bluegrass band with which she performed through her college years.

She attended DePaul University in Chicago on an academic scholarship. At DePaul she took mandolin lessons from Jethro Burns, who introduced her to his brother-in-law, Chet Atkins. Atkins became a friend and mentor to Anderson. One of her classical guitar teachers at DePaul was Leon Borkowski, who had been a student of Christopher Parkening. She took master classes with Parkening in Montana.

Anderson has performed with Chet Atkins, Tommy Emmanuel, Earl Klugh, Les Paul, and Doc Watson. Her 2020 release is "Acoustic Chef," a cookbook with a CD of music for each recipe. She recorded an album with the flamenco duo Tierra Negra. Her double-album, Nightlight Daylight, won eleven national and international awards. The CD cover contains fiber optics that illuminate an image of the sky when the cover is pressed. She usually plays a nylon string guitar and a Doolin custom 21-string harp guitar which has both nylon and steel strings.

Anderson has released more than a dozen solo albums, instructional CDs, and DVDs through TrueFire and Homespun, and songbooks published by Hal Leonard, Mel Bay, and Zen-On Japan. Her compositions include commissioned classical works for the Nashville Chamber Orchestra and Vox Caelestis Women's Choir. She is a member of the advisory board for Mel Bay.

She started All Star Guitar Night, which donates its money to the Music for Life Alliance, a charity she founded. Her music can be heard in Woody Allen's film, Vicky Cristina Barcelona. Her album Heartstrings accompanied astronauts on the space shuttle Discovery.

== Discography ==
- ...Just Begun (Rotary, 1978)
- Le Duet with Jean-Felix Lalanne (Rarefied, 1995)
- New Classics for Guitar and Cello (Valley Entertainment, 2003)
- Uncut Gems with Phil Keaggy, Stanley Jordan (CGD Music, 2003)
- Hometown Live (CGD, 2004)
- Wildcat (Heartstrings Attached Music, 2005)
- New World Flamenco with Tierra Negra (2009)
- Harp Guitars Under the Stars with John Doan (CGD, 2010)
- Arioso from Paris (CGD, 2012)
- Nightlight Daylight (CGD, 2014)
- Acoustic Chef (CGD, 2020)

== Video ==
Concert DVDs

- Muriel Anderson's All Star Guitar Night (Homespun, 1996)
- Muriel Anderson's All Star Guitar Night 2000 (Homespun 2002)
- Muriel Anderson's All Star Guitar Night 10th Anniversary (Mel Bay, 2004)
- One Camera One Concert (Snapshot, 2004)
- Muriel Anderson Live in Europe (CGD, 2006)
- Wonderlust (CGD, 2019)

Instructional DVDs

- Building Guitar Arrangements (CGD, 1994)
- Adventures in Fingerstyle Guitar:Techniques & Arrangements of Muriel Anderson (Homespun, 1997)
- Great Guitar Lessons (Homespun, 2001)
- Innovations for Acoustic Guitar (TrueFire, 2009)
- 10 Lessons (TrueFire, 2010)
- Fingerstyle Guitar Essentials: Arranging in D (TrueFire, 2010)
- 50 Right Hand Techniques You Must Know (TrueFire, 2011)
- 1-2-3 Fingerstyle (TrueFire, 2012)
- Essentials Fingerstyle (TrueFire, 2014)
- Essentials Fingerstyle, Chet Atkins Style (TrueFire, 2016)

== Books ==
- Chord Constellations (Creative Concepts, 1990)
- Building Guitar Arrangements Book/CD (Hal Leonard, 1994)
- All Chords in All Positions (Hal Leonard, 1996)
- Muriel Anderson Hometown Live (Mel Bay, 1998)
- All Scales in All Positions (Hal Leonard, 2000)
- Hometown Live Songbook (Zen-On, 2000)
- Selected Guitar Works (Zen-On, 2000)
- Acoustic Chef (CGD, 2020)

Compilation books

- Winfield Winners Songbook/CD (John August/Mel Bay, 1995)
- Portraits of Christmas Songbook/CD (John August/Mel Bay, 1996)
- Blues 2000 (Mel Bay, 2000)
- Fingerstyle Guitar Solos (Mel Bay, 2000)
- Remembering Marcel (Mel Bay, 2001)
