= Guitar Player =

American magazine

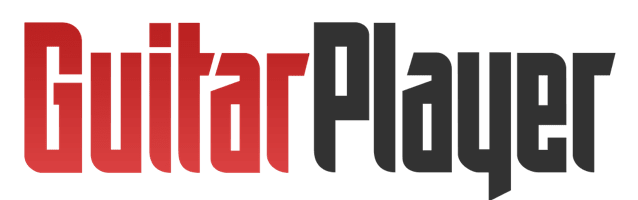

- Cover of the final issue (December 2024), featuring Jimmy Page
- Editor: Christopher Scapelliti
- Categories: Music magazine
- Frequency: Monthly
- Circulation: 134,146
- Founded: 1967
- Final issue: December 2024
- Company: Future US
- Country: United States
- Based in: New York City, New York
- Language: English
- Website: guitarplayer.com
- ISSN: 0017-5463

Guitar Player was an American magazine for guitarists, founded in 1967 in San Jose, California. It contained articles, interviews, reviews and lessons covering artists, genres and products. The magazine was last edited by Christopher Scapelliti. The print magazine ceased publication in 2024; the December issue was the magazine's last.

== Contents ==
A typical issue of Guitar Player includes in-depth artist features, extensive lessons, gear and music reviews, letters to the magazine, and various front-of-book articles.

== Guitar Player TV ==
In May 2006, the Music Player Network partnered with TrueFire TV to launch an internet-based television station for guitarists. It provides content similar to that of the magazine such as interviews and lessons. Guitar Player TV is provided at no cost to the user because of advertising and sponsorship.

== Guitar competitions ==
Guitar Player has a yearly competition now called "Guitar Superstar", which used to be the "Guitar Hero Competition".
