= Matt Thomas (guitarist) =

American guitarist (born 1986)

Matt Thomas (born May 11, 1986) is an American guitarist residing in Virginia Beach, Virginia. He is noted for his work on the harp guitar and acoustic guitar.

== Achievements and awards ==
- 1st place National Contemporary Thumbpicking 2006
- 1st place National Open Thumbpicking 2006
- National Thumbpicking Grand Champion 2006
- 1st Place International Open Thumbpicking 2007
- Kentucky Hall of Fame Inductee 2007
- Winfield 3rd place International Fingerstyle Championship 2017
- 1st Place International Fingerstyle Collective Championship 2019

== Studio albums ==
- Man on the Moon, 2017, Cimirron

== Endorsements and equipment ==
- Larrivee
- Mayson Guitars
- Tonedevil Guitars
- Grace Design Preamps
