= Don Alder =

Canadian musician

Don Alder CM
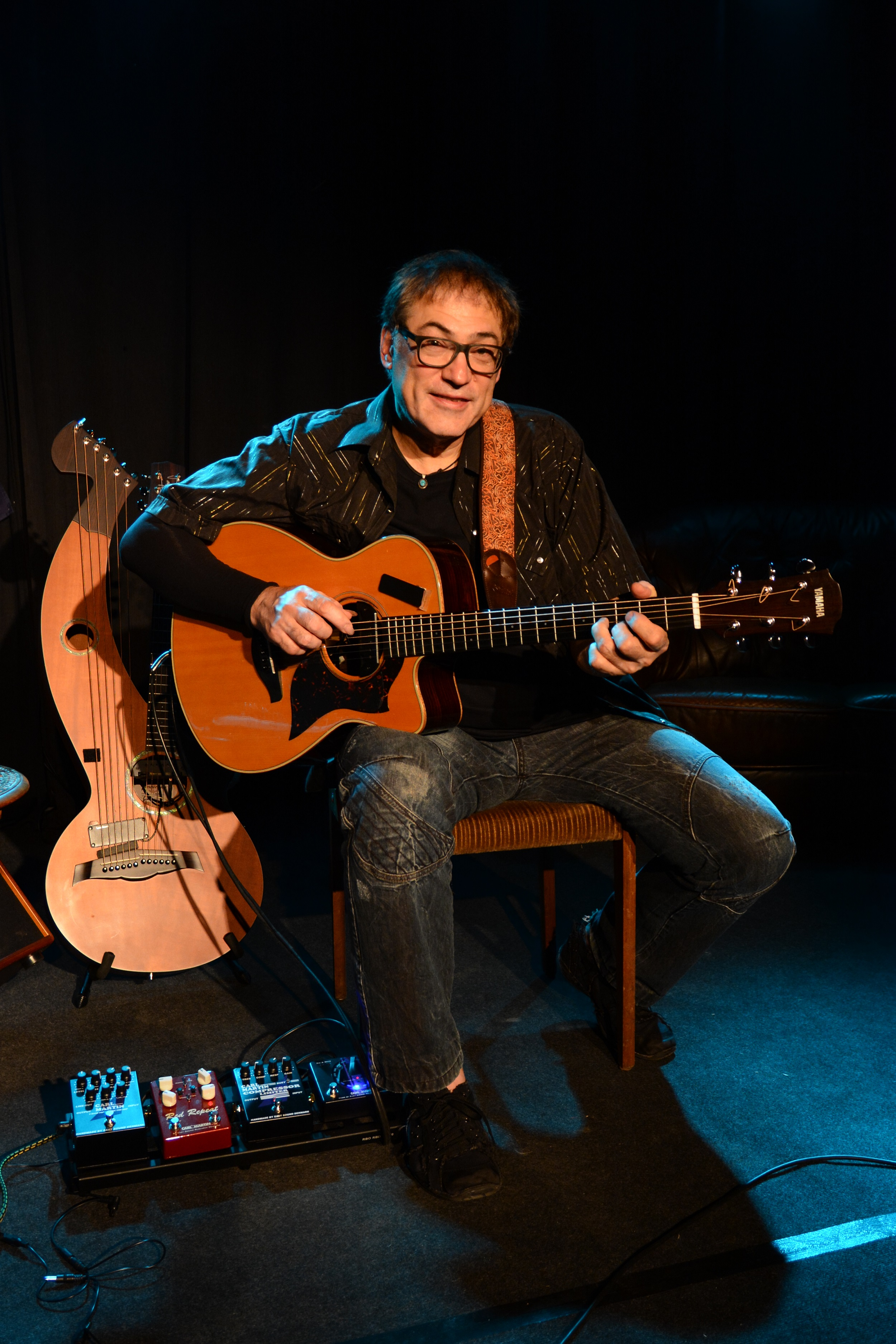

Background information
- Born: Vancouver, British Columbia
- Genres: acoustic rock
- Occupations: Musician, composer
- Instruments: Guitar, vocals, harp guitar
- Years active: 1986–present
- Website: www.donalder.com https://www.facebook.com/donalderfanpage

Donald L. Alder (born in Vancouver, BC, Canada) is a Canadian fingerstyle guitarist, singer, songwriter, composer, and speaker.

== Biography ==
He spent his early childhood years in Montreal, before his family moved to Williams Lake, British Columbia. He has played guitar since age 11. In March 1985, Alder put his music career on hold to accompany his friend Rick Hansen on his Man in Motion world tour. In January 1988, Mayor Woods of Williams Lake presented a certificate of merit to Don Alder for "Disabled Awareness - Man in Motion".

Don Alder's character appears in the feature film "Heart of a Dragon" (2008), a movie about the Man In Motion Tour, with Andrew Lee Potts playing the character of "Don". Don Alder also worked on this movie as a technical advisor.

Don Alder was a member of the Canadian National Paralympic team in Atlanta for the 1996 Games and again in 2000 for the Games in Sydney, Australia. Alder did not participate as an athlete but as the equipment manager and wheelchair technician.

In 2007, Don Alder became International Fingerstyle Champion. In 2010, he was the Guitar Superstar contest winner. In 2011, he won the World Wide Guitar Idol contest. In 2013, he won Brand Laureate Award (Malaysia) for his contributions using his guitar and music to help and inspire others around the world. In 2015, he was awarded the "Domenic Troiano Guitar Award" in the category "multi-genre". Today, Alder continues to play to Canadian, American, European, and Asian audiences. In 2016, he was nominated for a Canadian Folk Music Award and a Western Canadian Music Award. In 2017, he won "Artist of the Year" at the Vancouver Island Music Awards. In 2021, the BC Entertainment Hall of Fame honored Don Alder with a Star Meritus status. In 2022 Don Alder was awarded The BC Lieutenant Governor's Arts and Music Award In 2024 Don Alder was appointed to the Order of Canada. In 2025 Don Alder received the King Charles III Coronation Medal.

Don Alder is a board member of Empower Through Music in Vancouver, BC.

Alder has performed at venues around the world, including Muriel Anderson's All Star Guitar Night which he performed at five times. He writes and performs all of his own music, and has released seven albums. Greenfield Guitars designed a signature guitar for Don Alder, known as the G4-Don Alder model, which is a G4 married with a Novax Fanned Fret fingerboard.

Don Alder has done volunteer work for the Vancouver Adapted Music Society.

He is also a featured performer for Synergy Collective.

Don Alder has many endorsements, including Seymour Duncan, Yamaha Guitars, Riversong Guitars, Santo Angelo Cables, Tonewood Amps, Journey Guitars, Leviora Guitars, Guitar Hands, Ernie Ball, and Dyer Harp Guitars.

== Discography ==
2023 Won't He Home; 2015 Armed and Dangerous; 2008 Not A Planet; 2007 Acoustic Matters; 2005 Take The Train, eh; 2005 Cool Tunes Compilation; 2005 Best of Don Alder; 2003 Acoustiholic;

== Media feedback ==
Penticton Herald: "Don Alder, the King of Strings."

Vancouver Magazine: "Don Alder is widely acclaimed as one of the finest acoustic guitarists in the world."

"In einer sehr melodiösen Klangsprache entfaltet der Meister der Gitarre einen Song ohne Worte, ein musikalisches Zwiegespräch zwischen zwei "Stimmen" seiner Gitarre." (WAZ Herne, 12/2016 - With his very melodic sound language the guitar virtuoso creates a song without words, a dialogue between two "voices" of his guitar.)

"Don Alder ist nicht nur Gitarrist, sondern auch Sänger. Seine Songs sind auch deswegen abwechslungsreich, weil er sie zum Teil auf einer Harfengitarre spielt, die Alders Klangspektrum noch einmal erweitert." (NOZ, 09/2017) - Don Alder is not only a guitarist, but also a singer/songwriter. He's offering a big variety of songs by using different types of guitars, f.e. his harp guitar, which offers a wider sound spectrum than a normal acoustic guitar.

"Der Kanadier ist der international mit den meisten Titeln ausgezeichnete Gitarrist und manchmal denkt man, es würde nicht nur ein Gitarrenspieler auf der Bühne stehen." (Leverkusen, 11/2017) - The Canadian is an international successful guitarist who won several awards, and sometimes his music sounds like there is not only guitarist on stage.
