= 2009 CAF Champions League final =

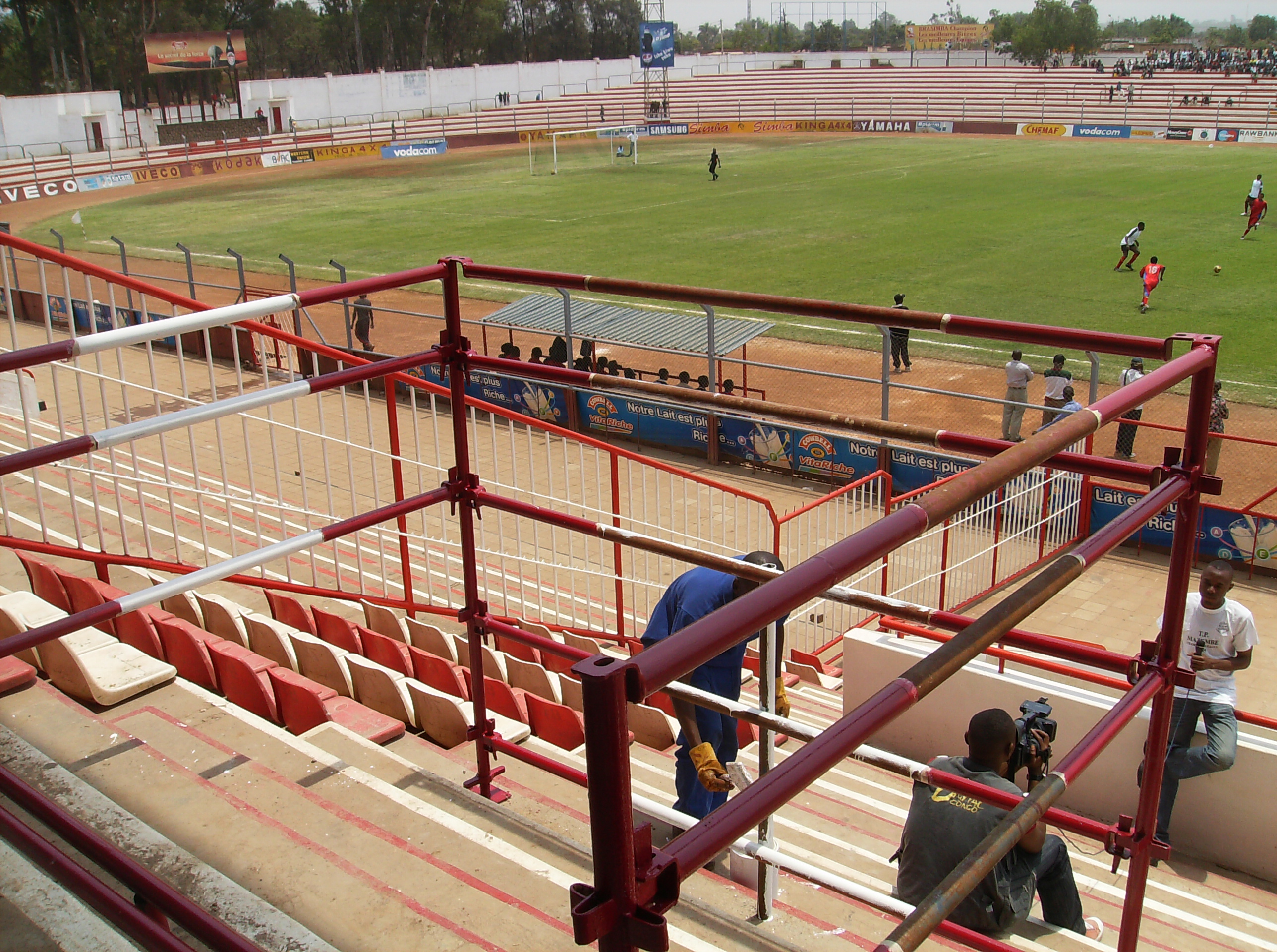
- Frederic Kibassa Maliba Stadium hosted the podium where TP Mazembe lifted the trophy
- Event: 2009 CAF Champions League
Heartland FC	TP Mazembe
(Nigeria)	(Democratic Republic of the Congo)
2	2

First leg
Heartland FC	TP Mazembe
2	1
- Date: 1 November 2009
- Venue: Dan Anyiam Stadium, Owerri
- Referee: Essam Abd El Fatah (Egypt)
- Attendance: 10,000

Second Leg
TP Mazembe	Heartland FC
1	0
- Date: 7 November 2009
- Venue: Stade Frederic Kibassa Maliba, Lubumbashi
- Referee: Mohamed Benouza (Algeria)
- Attendance: 35,000

The 2009 CAF Champions League final was a football tie held over two legs in November 2009 between Heartland, and TP Mazembe.

The first leg was held on 1 November and the second leg on 7 November.

== Qualified teams ==
In the following table, finals until 1996 were in the African Cup of Champions Club era, since 1997 were in the CAF Champions League era.

Team	Region	Previous finals appearances (bold indicates winners)
(Nigeria) Heartland	WAFU (West Africa)	1988
(Democratic Republic of the Congo) TP Mazembe	UNIFFAC (Central Africa)	**1967**, **1968**, 1969, 1970

== Venues ==
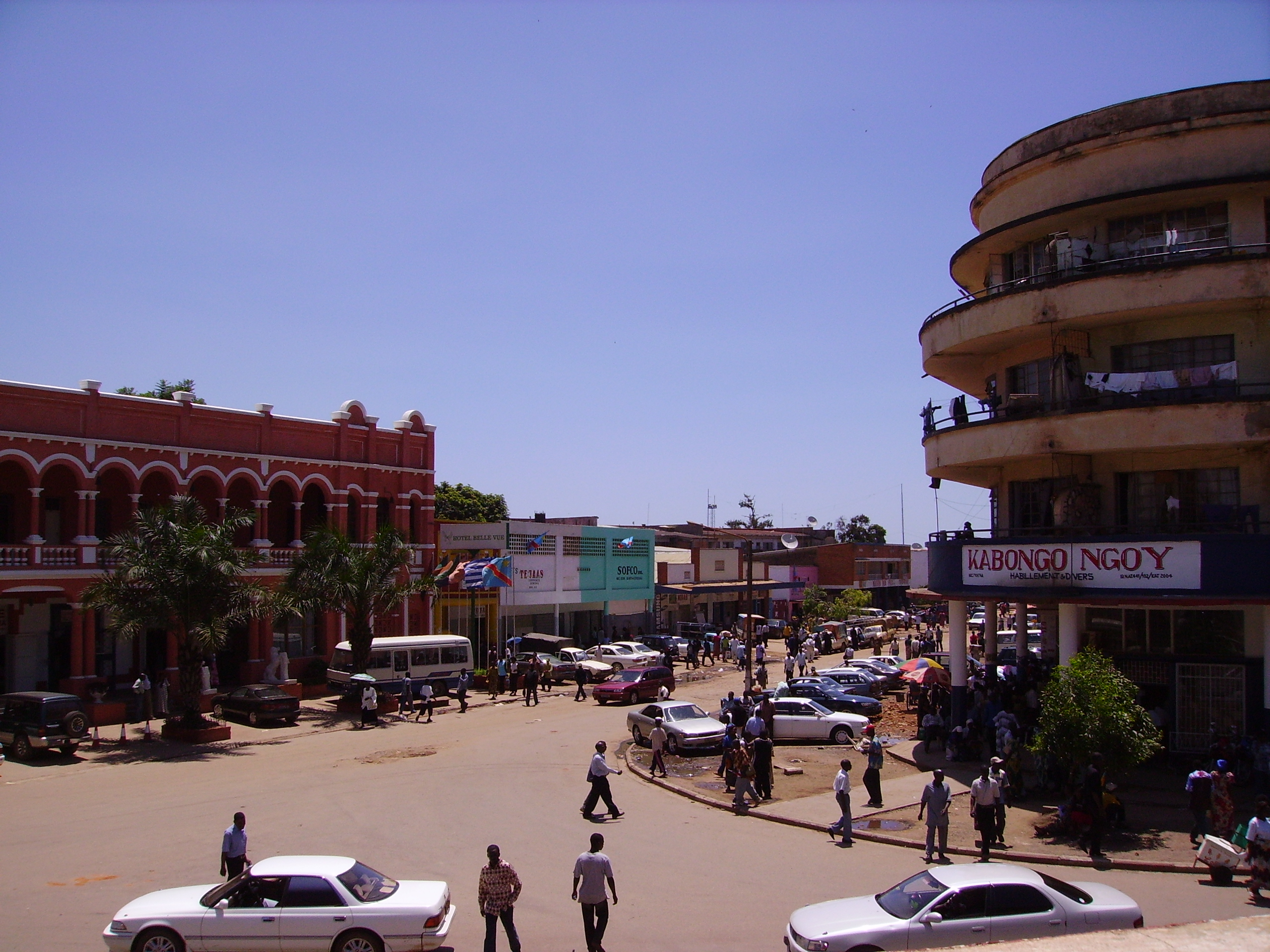
Lubumbashi, DR Congo hosted the second leg.

=== Dan Anyiam Stadium ===
Dan Anyiam Stadium is a Nigerian multi-purpose stadium located in Owerri, Imo State. It is located in the centre of Owerri, Imo State's capital, the capital of Imo State, the stadium is named after Daniel Anyiam, vice-captain of the first Nigeria national football team.

It is used mostly for association-football matches and is the home stadium of Heartland F.C. The stadium a capacity of 10,000 people.

=== Frederic Kibassa Maliba Stadium ===
Stade Frédéric-Kibassa-Maliba, also known as Stade de la Kenya, is a multi-use stadium located in the Kenya suburb of Lubumbashi, Democratic Republic of the Congo. It is currently used mostly for football matches. It is the current home of FC Saint Eloi Lupopo and the former home venue of TP Mazembe. The stadium has a capacity of 35,000 people and is named after Frederic Kibassa Maliba, a former Minister of Youth and Sports.

== Road to final ==
(Nigeria) Heartland				Round	(Democratic Republic of the Congo) TP Mazembe			
Opponent	Agg.	1st leg	2nd leg	Qualifying rounds	Opponent	Agg.	1st leg	2nd leg
(Liberia) Monrovia Black Star	10–1	4–0 (H)	6–1 (A)	Preliminary round	Bye			
(Morocco) FAR Rabat	4–2	3–1 (H)	1–1 (A)	First round	(Angola) Petro Atlético	5–1	3–0 (H)	2–1 (A)
(Cameroon) Coton Sport	3–2	2–1 (H)	1–1 (A)	Second round	(Morocco) Ittihad Khemisset	1–0	1–0 (H)	0–0 (A)
Opponent	Result			Group stage	Opponent	Result		
(Democratic Republic of the Congo) TP Mazembe	0–2 (A)			Matchday 1	(Nigeria) Heartland	2–0 (H)		
(Zimbabwe) Monomotapa United	3–1 (H)			Matchday 2	(Tunisia) Étoile du Sahel	1–2 (A)		
(Tunisia) Étoile du Sahel	3–0 (H)			Matchday 3	(Zimbabwe) Monomotapa United	5–0 (H)		
(Tunisia) Étoile du Sahel	0–0 (A)			Matchday 4	(Zimbabwe) Monomotapa United	2–0 (A)		
(Democratic Republic of the Congo) TP Mazembe	2–0 (H)			Matchday 5	(Nigeria) Heartland	0–2 (A)		
(Zimbabwe) Monomotapa United	1–2 (A)			Matchday 6	(Tunisia) Étoile du Sahel	1–0 (H)		
Group B Runner-up: Pos / Team / Pld / W / D / L / GF / GA / GD / Pts / Qualification; 1 / (Democratic Republic of the Congo) TP Mazembe / 6 / 4 / 0 / 2 / 11 / 4 / +7 / **12** / **Advance to knockout stage**; **2** / (Nigeria) Heartland / **6** / **3** / **1** / **2** / **9** / **5** / **+4** / **10** / **Advance to knockout stage**; 3 / (Tunisia) Étoile du Sahel / 6 / 2 / 1 / 3 / 5 / 7 / −2 / **7**; 4 / (Zimbabwe) Monomotapa United / 6 / 2 / 0 / 4 / 5 / 14 / −9 / **6**; Source:				Final standings	Group B Winner: Pos / Team / Pld / W / D / L / GF / GA / GD / Pts / Qualification; **1** / (Democratic Republic of the Congo) TP Mazembe / **6** / **4** / **0** / **2** / **11** / **4** / **+7** / **12** / **Advance to knockout stage**; 2 / (Nigeria) Heartland / 6 / 3 / 1 / 2 / 9 / 5 / +4 / **10** / **Advance to knockout stage**; 3 / (Tunisia) Étoile du Sahel / 6 / 2 / 1 / 3 / 5 / 7 / −2 / **7**; 4 / (Zimbabwe) Monomotapa United / 6 / 2 / 0 / 4 / 5 / 14 / −9 / **6**; Source:			
Opponent	Agg.	1st leg	2nd leg	Knock-out stage	Opponent	Agg.	1st leg	2nd leg
(Nigeria) Kano Pillars	5–0	4–0 (H)	1–0 (A)	Semifinals	(Sudan) Al Hilal	5–0	5–2 (A)	0–2 (H)

== Format ==
The final was decided over two legs, with aggregate goals used to determine the winner. If the sides were level on aggregate after the second leg, the away goals rule would have been applied, and if still level, the tie would have proceeded directly to a penalty shootout (no extra time is played).

== Matches ==
=== First leg ===
1 November 2009
16:00 UTC+1

Heartland (Nigeria)	2–1	(Democratic Republic of the Congo) TP Mazembe
King Osanga 24'; Uche Agba 80'	Report	Tresor Mputu 23'

Dan Anyiam Stadium, Owerri
Attendance: 10,000
Referee: Essam Abd El Fatah (Egypt)

**Heartland**	**Mazembe**

Heartland:
GK	1	(Nigeria) Brown Augustine
RB	3	(Ghana) Aziz Ansah
CB	4	(Nigeria) Joseph Eyimofe	(substituted off) 74'
CB	16	(Nigeria) Emmanuel Olowo
LB	2	(Nigeria) Ike Thankgod
RM	20	(Nigeria) Chinedu Efugh
CM	27	(Nigeria) Ikechukwu Ibenegbu	(substituted off) 82'
CM	13	(Nigeria) Uche Agba
LM	15	(Nigeria) Emeka Nwanna
CF	11	(Nigeria) Joshua Obaje	(substituted off) 72'
CF	10	(Nigeria) King Osanga
Substitutes:
MF	25	(Nigeria) Julius Ubido	(substituted on) 82'
DF	6	(Nigeria) Orji Kalu Okagbue	(substituted on) 74'
FW	9	(Nigeria) Peter Nwadike	(substituted on) 72'
Manager:
(Bulgaria) Mitko Dobrev

Mazembe:
GK	**1**	(Democratic Republic of the Congo) Muteba Kidiaba
RB	**3**	(Democratic Republic of the Congo) Kiritsho Kasusula
CB	**4**	(Democratic Republic of the Congo) Miala Nkulukutu
CB	**16**	(Zambia) Stopila Sunzu
LB	**2**	(Democratic Republic of the Congo) Joël Kimwaki
RM	**20**	(Democratic Republic of the Congo) Mihayo Kazembe
CM	**27**	(Democratic Republic of the Congo) Kasongo Ngandu	(substituted off) 61'
CM	**13**	(Democratic Republic of the Congo) Bedi Mbenza
LM	**15**	(Democratic Republic of the Congo) Dioko Kaluyituka
CF	**11**	(Democratic Republic of the Congo) Patou Kabangu	(substituted off) 80'
CF	**10**	(Zambia) Given Singuluma	(substituted off) 49'
Substitutes:
MF	?	(Democratic Republic of the Congo) Guy Lusadisu	(substituted on) 49'
DF	?	(Democratic Republic of the Congo) Eric Nkulukuta	(substituted on) 61'
MF	?	(Democratic Republic of the Congo) Ngandu Kasongo	(substituted on) 80'
Manager:
(France) Diego Garzitto

Assistant referees:
Sherif Salah (Egypt)
Walid Chaaban (Egypt)
Fourth official:
Mohamed Farouk (Egypt)

=== Second leg ===
7 November 2009
14:45 UTC+2

TP Mazembe (Democratic Republic of the Congo)	1–0	(Nigeria) Heartland
Emmanuel Omodiagbe 73' (o.g.)	Report

Stade de la Kenya, Lubumbashi
Attendance: 35,000
Referee: Mohamed Benouza (Algeria)

**TP Mazembe**	**Heartland**

Mazembe:
GK	1	(Democratic Republic of the Congo) Muteba Kidiaba
RB	3	(Democratic Republic of the Congo) Kiritsho Kasusula
CB	4	(Democratic Republic of the Congo) Miala Nkulukutu
CB	16	(Zambia) Stopila Sunzu
LB	2	(Democratic Republic of the Congo) Joël Kimwaki
RM	20	(Democratic Republic of the Congo) Mihayo Kazembe
CM	27	(Democratic Republic of the Congo) Kasongo Ngandu
CM	13	(Democratic Republic of the Congo) Bedi Mbenza
LM	15	(Democratic Republic of the Congo) Dioko Kaluyituka
CF	11	(Democratic Republic of the Congo) Patou Kabangu
CF	10	(Zambia) Given Singuluma	(substituted off) 48'
Substitutes:
MF	25	(Democratic Republic of the Congo) Guy Lusadisu	(substituted on) 48'
Manager:
(France) Diego Garzitto

Heartland:
GK	1	(Nigeria) Brown Augustine	(substituted off) 58'
RB	3	(Ghana) Aziz Ansah
CB	4	(Nigeria) Victor Ezuruike
CB	16	(Nigeria) Orji Kalu Okagbue
LB	2	(Nigeria) Ike Thankgod
RM	20	(Nigeria) Chinedu Efugh
CM	27	(Nigeria) Emmanuel Omodiagbe
CM	13	(Nigeria) Ikechukwu Ibenegbu
LM	15	(Nigeria) Uche Agba
CF	11	(Nigeria) Emeka Nwanna
CF	10	(Nigeria) King Osanga	(substituted off) 50'
Substitutes:
MF	25	(Zambia) Signs Chibambo	(substituted on) 50'
GK	6	(Nigeria) Ikechukwu Ezenwa	(substituted on) 58'
Manager:
(Bulgaria) Mitko Dobrev

Assistant referees:
Nasser Sadek (Egypt)
Meamar Chaabani (Algeria)
Fourth official:
Ebrahim Abdul Basit (South Africa)
