= 2009 CAF Champions League qualifying rounds =

- Dates: 30 January – 15 February 2009

This page provides the summaries of the matches of the qualifying rounds for the group stage of the 2009 CAF Champions League.

== Preliminary round ==
In this round the 42 teams that did not receive byes to the First Round were randomly drawn against each other.

The matches were held between 30 January 2009 and 15 February 2009. The 21 winners advanced to the First Round held in March 2009.

31 January 2009
15:00 UTC+1

Primeiro de Agosto (Angola)	5 – 2	(Republic of the Congo) CARA Brazzaville
Ramaphoco 8'; Fofana 31'; Bena 36' 66'; Love Kabungula 61'		Elinga 12'; Kumaca 79' (o.g.)

Estádio da Cidadela, Luanda
Referee: Wellington Kaoma (Zambia)
15 February 2009

CARA Brazzaville (Republic of the Congo)	1 – 2	(Angola) Primeiro de Agosto
Rochel Osséré 62'		Alberto 86'; Miangounina 90+' (o.g.)

Stade Alphonse Massemba-Débat, Brazzaville
Referee: Kakonde Kazubu (Congo DR)

Primeiro de Agosto won 7 – 3 on aggregate and advanced to the First round.

1 February 2009

Canon Yaoundé (Cameroon)	1 – 1	(Burundi) AS Inter Star
Mbete Mezang 85'		Harerimana Moussa 47'

Stade Omnisports, Yaoundé
Referee: Adam Cordier (Chad)
15 February 2009

AS Inter Star (Burundi)	0 – 1	(Cameroon) Canon Yaoundé
		Jacques Boma Liliba 43'

Bujumbura
Referee: Sylvester Kirwa (Kenya)

Canon Yaoundé won 2 – 1 on aggregate and advanced to the First round.

31 January 2009
17:00 UTC±0

AS Douanes (Senegal)	3 – 1	(Sierra Leone) Ports Authority F.C.
Mor Diouf 14'; Babacar Ndiour 54'; Meissa Binta Ndiaye 63'		Sallieu Kamara 83'

Stade Leopold Senghor, Dakar
Referee: Lemghambodj Ould (Mauritania)
14 February 2009

Ports Authority F.C. (Sierra Leone)	0 – 1	(Senegal) AS Douanes
		Ngala Sylla 42'

National Stadium, Freetown
Referee: Aboubacar Bangoura (Guinea)

AS Douanes won 4 – 1 on aggregate and advanced to the First round.

31 January 2009

Kano Pillars (Nigeria)	2 – 0	(Chad) Elect Sport N'Djamena
Moses Ogaga 68'; Victor Namo 86'

Sani Abacha Stadium, Kano
Referee: Komlan Sousou (Togo)
14 February 2009

Elect Sport N'Djamena (Chad)	0 – 0	(Nigeria) Kano Pillars

N'Djamena
Referee: Jean Michel Moukoko (Congo)

Kano Pillars won 2 – 0 on aggregate and advanced to the First round.

Club Africain (Tunisia)	w/o	(Guinea-Bissau) Sporting Clube de Bafatá

Club Africain advanced to the First round after Sporting Clube de Bafatá withdrew.

1 February 2009

Djoliba (Mali)	4 – 0	(Senegal) Casa Sport
Amadou Diallo 10'; Janvier Abouta 46'; Souleymane Dembele 76'; Ousmane Cissé 90+3'

Complex Sportif Hérémakono, Bamako
Referee: Bakary Papa Gassama (Gambia)
15 February 2009

Casa Sport (Senegal)	1 – 0	(Mali) Djoliba
Abdou Sagna 37' (pen.)

Stade Aline Sitoe Diatta, Ziguinchor
Referee: Ebenezer Konah (Liberia)

Djoliba won 4 – 1 on aggregate and advanced to the First round.

1 February 2009

Ferroviário Maputo (Mozambique)	2 – 1	(Uganda) Kampala City Council FC
Danito Parruque (1H); Mauricio (?)		Brian Umony (?)

Estádio da Machava, Maputo
Referee: Verson Lwanja (Malawi)
14 February 2009

Kampala City Council FC (Uganda)	2 – 0	(Mozambique) Ferroviário Maputo
Brian Umony 53'; Robert Ssentongo 83'

National Stadium, Kampala
Referee: Badr Abdul Gadir (Sudan)

Kampala City Council FC won 3 – 2 on aggregate and advanced to the First round.

1 February 2009
15:45 UTC+2

Supersport United (South Africa)	3 – 0	(Mauritius) Curepipe Starlight
Brent Carelse 35' (pen.) 60'; Glen Salmon 75'

Super Stadium, Atteridgeville
Referee: Arvo Mufeti (Namibia)
15 February 2009

Curepipe Starlight (Mauritius)	2 – 5	(South Africa) Supersport United
Rodson Tosojoa 29'; Oleyeni 34'		Bongani Khumalo 13'; Glen Salmon 18'; Daine Klate 47'; Brent Carelse 48'; Anthony Laffor 84'

Stade George V, Curepipe
Referee: Mateus Infante (Mozambique)

Supersport United won 8 – 2 on aggregate and advanced to the First round.

1 February 2009

Heartland (Nigeria)	4 – 0	(Liberia) Monrovia Black Star
Ik ThankGod 2'; Aziz Ansah 46' (pen.); Stanley Okoro 74'; Owusu Addai 89'	Report

Dan Anyiam Stadium, Owerri
Referee: Chabi Sahi (Benin)
15 February 2009

Monrovia Black Star (Liberia)	1 – 6	(Nigeria) Heartland
Bill Sheriff 44'	Report	Signs Wonders Chibambo 42'; Owusu Addai 66'; Aziz Ansah 74'; Julius Ubido 79'; John Owoeri 89' 90+1'

Antonette Tubman Stadium, Monrovia
Referee: Ousmane Karembe (Mali)

Heartland won 10 – 1 on aggregate and advanced to the First round.

31 January 2009
14:30 UTC±0

FAR Rabat (Morocco)	6 – 1	(Cape Verde) Sporting Clube da Praia
Mustapha El Allaoui 3' (pen.) 41' (pen.) 56'; Youssef Kaddioui 62'; Issam Erraki 64'; Abderrahmane Mssassi 73'		Lucas Mendes Andrade 90'

Stade Moulay Abdellah, Rabat
Referee: Mohamed Meddeb (Tunisia)
14 February 2009
15:30 UTC-1

Sporting Clube da Praia (Cape Verde)	1 – 0	(Morocco) FAR Rabat
Tigana Robalo (2H)

Estádio da Varzea, Praia
Referee: Edward Parkinson (Sierra Leone)

FAR Rabat won 6 – 2 on aggregate and advanced to the First round.

1 February 2009

Petro de Luanda (Angola)	3 – 0	(Eswatini) Royal Leopards
David Dinis Magalhaes 16' 47'; Job 27'

Estádio da Cidadela, Luanda
Referee: Kenias Marange (Zimbabwe)
15 February 2009

Royal Leopards (Eswatini)	0 – 3	(Angola) Petro de Luanda
		Sérgio 9'; Job 11' 40'

Simunye Park, Simunye
Referee: Jonas Nhlapo (South Africa)

Petro de Luanda won 6 – 0 on aggregate and advanced to the First round.

31 January 2009

Etoile Filante Ouagadougou (Burkina Faso)	2 – 0	(Ghana) Heart of Lions
Eric Soulama 24'; Amadou Tidiane Tall 85'

Stade du 4-Août, Ouagadougou
Referee: Bunmi Ogunkolade (Nigeria)
15 February 2009

Heart of Lions (Ghana)	3 – 2	(Burkina Faso) Etoile Filante Ouagadougou
Stephen Owusu 61' 80'; Hans Kwofie 69'		Georges Bonou 58'; Eric Soulama 64'

Kpando Stadium, Kpandu
Referee: Ibrahim Chaibou (Niger)

Etoile Filante Ouagadougou won 4 – 3 on aggregate and advanced to the First round.

31 January 2009
18:00 UTC+2

Al Ahly (Libya)	6 – 0	(Niger) AS Police
Koko'o 14' 90+5'; Mohamed Al Tijani 43'; Walid Esbaee 68'; Nader Kara 89' 90+7'

11 June Stadium, Tripoli
Referee: Khalid Ramsis (Morocco)
15 February 2009
16:30 UTC+1

AS Police (Niger)	2 – 1	(Libya) Al Ahly
(2H) (2H)		Ahmed Saad 72'

Niamey
Referee: Jean-Baptiste Bassano (Burkina Faso)

Al Ahly won 7 – 2 on aggregate and advanced to the First round.

Ittihad Khemisset (Morocco)	w/o	(The Gambia) Wallidan

Ittihad Khemisset advanced to the First round after Wallidan Football Club withdrew.

30 January 2009
18:00 UTC+1

ASO Chlef (Algeria)	1 – 0	(Guinea) Fello Star
Mohamed Messaoud 37'

Stade Mohamed Boumezrag, Chlef
Referee: Wahid Tamuni (Libya)
15 February 2009
16:30 UTC±0

Fello Star (Guinea)	1 – 2	(Algeria) ASO Chlef
Lamine Camara 58'		Mustapha Gouaiche 25'; Paul Emile Biyaga 80'

Stade Saïfoulaye Diallo, Labé
Referee: Malang Diedhiou (Senegal)

ASO Chlef won 3 – 1 on aggregate and advanced to the First round.

1 February 2009

DC Motema Pembe (Democratic Republic of the Congo)	1 – 2	(Gabon) AS Mangasport
Embounga 46'		Romaric Rogombe 8'; Medego Ahmed Evariste 60'

Stade des Martyrs, Kinshasa
Referee: Lambert Eyene (Cameroon)
15 February 2009

AS Mangasport (Gabon)	1 – 0	(Democratic Republic of the Congo) DC Motema Pembe
Mabide Vianney (1H)

Stade Henri Sylvoz, Moanda
Referee: Prince Arcy Dongombe (Central African Republic)

AS Mangasport won 3 – 1 on aggregate and advanced to the First round.

1 February 2009

Monomotapa United (Zimbabwe)	2 – 0	(Zanzibar) Miembeni
Brian Mapfumo 3' 71'

Rufaro Stadium, Harare
Referee: Israel Malepa (Botswana)
14 February 2009

Miembeni (Zanzibar)	2 – 1	(Zimbabwe) Monomotapa United
Said Wambunje 2'; William Sylvester 54' (pen.)		Edimore Chitako 14'

Amaan Stadium, Zanzibar City
Referee: Issa Kagabo (Rwanda)

Monomotapa United F.C. won 3 – 2 on aggregate and advanced to the First round.

31 January 2009

Young Africans (Tanzania)	8 – 1	(Comoros) Etoile d'Or
Boniface Ambani 2' 71' (pen.) 80' 85'; Jerry Tegete 53' 76'; Wisdom Ndlovu 74'; Mrisho Ngassa 81'		Abubakar Alisouf 20'

National Stadium, Dar es Salaam
Referee: Fredrick Kayindi-Ngobi (Uganda)
15 February 2009

Etoile d'Or (Comoros)	0 – 6	(Tanzania) Young Africans
		Mrisho Ngassa (?) (?) (?) (?); Boniface Ambani (?); Vincent Barnabas (?)

Mirontsy
Referee: Gilbert Dlamini (Swaziland)

Young Africans won 14 – 1 on aggregate and advanced to the First round.

15 February 2009

US Stade Tamponnaise (Réunion)	6 – 0	(Madagascar) Academie Ny Antsika
Michel Fontaine 10' 67'; Eric Farro 23' 83'; Johan Boulard 52'; Roberto Elcaman 66'

Stade Klébert Picard, Le Tampon
Attendance: 1,241
Referee: Sentso Mohau (Lesotho)

US Stade Tamponnaise won 6 – 0 and advanced to the First round.

Played as a single match after the scheduled first leg was cancelled due to political violence in Madagascar

31 January 2009
15:00 UTC+2

ZESCO United (Zambia)	2 – 0	(Kenya) Mathare United
Clifford Chipalo 65' 88'

Trade Fair Grounds, Ndola
Referee: Hélder Martins de Carvalho (Angola)
14 February 2009

Mathare United (Kenya)	1 – 3	(Zambia) ZESCO United
Kevin Ochieng 66' (pen.)		Enoch Sakala 12' 55'; Clifford Chipalo 88'

Moi International Sports Centre, Nairobi
Referee: Mohamed Ali Farah (Djibouti)

ZESCO United F.C. won 5 – 1 on aggregate and advanced to the First round.

31 January 2009
20:00 UTC+3

Al-Merreikh (Sudan)	2 – 1	(Rwanda) ATRACO
Haytham Tambal 2'; Endurance Idahor 66'		Joseph Kabagambe 85'

Al Merreikh Stadium, Omdurman
Referee: Amanuel Eyob (Eritrea)
15 February 2009
15:00 UTC+2

ATRACO (Rwanda)	0 – 0	(Sudan) Al-Merreikh

Nyamirambo Stadium, Kigali
Referee: Sheha Waziri (Tanzania)

Al-Merreikh won 2 – 1 on aggregate and advanced to the First round.

== Dispensation Round ==
Two federations inscribed their clubs after the deadline, but were admitted for an intermediate round. However, the winning club could only gain access to the first round if another winning club from the preliminary round withdrew subsequently.

22 February 2009

Stade Centrafricain (Central African Republic)	1 – 0	(Equatorial Guinea) Akonangui
21'

Barthelemy Boganda Stadium, Bangui
8 March 2009

Akonangui (Equatorial Guinea)	1 – 0 (a.e.t.)	(Central African Republic) Stade Centrafricain
Penalties
	5 – 4

Bata

1 – 1 on aggregate after extra time; Akonangui FC won 5 – 4 on penalty kicks. However, as no victorious side withdrew from the tournament, Akonangui did not advance to the first round.

== First round ==
This a knock-out stage of 32 teams; the 21 teams advancing from the preliminary round, and 11 teams that received byes to this round.

14 March 2009
16:00 UTC+1

Primeiro de Agosto (Angola)	0 – 1	(Cameroon) Canon Yaoundé
		Joseph Amboem 62'

Estádio da Cidadela, Luanda
Referee: Mbila Leya (Congo DR)
6 April 2009

Canon Yaoundé (Cameroon)	0 – 1 (a.e.t.)	(Angola) Primeiro de Agosto
		Tuabi 32'
Penalties
	4 – 5

Stade Omnisports, Yaoundé
Referee: Noumandiez Doue (Ivory Coast)

1 – 1 on aggregate after extra time; C.D. Primeiro de Agosto won 5 – 4 on penalty kicks and advanced to the Second round.

14 March 2009

AS Douanes (Senegal)	1 – 1	(Nigeria) Kano Pillars
Mor Diouf 45' (pen.)		Mor Diouf 5' (o.g.)

Stade Leopold Senghor, Dakar
Referee: Victor Rocha Lima (Cape Verde)
4 April 2009

Kano Pillars (Nigeria)	0 – 0	(Senegal) AS Douanes

Ahmadu Bello Stadium, Kaduna
Referee: Yves Roponat (Gabon)

Aggregate score 1 – 1. Kano Pillars F.C. advanced to the Second round on the away goals rule.

15 March 2009
15:30 UTC+1

Club Africain (Tunisia)	1 – 2	(Mali) Djoliba
Oussama Sellami 85' (pen.)		Amadou Diallo 14'; Souleymane Dembele 90'

Stade Olympique d'El Menzah, Tunis
Referee: Bouchaib El Ahrach (Morocco)
5 April 2009
17:30 UTC+1

Djoliba (Mali)	0 – 1	(Tunisia) Club Africain
		Ezenwa Otorogu (2H)

Complex Sportif Hérémakono, Bamako
Referee: Rashid Sanusie (Sierra Leone)

Aggregate score 2 – 2. Djoliba AC advanced to the Second round on the away goals rule.

13 March 2009
16:00 UTC+3

Kampala City Council FC (Uganda)	2 – 1	(South Africa) Supersport United
Robert Ssentongo 51'; Brian Omony 58'		Anthony Laffor 47'

National Stadium, Kampala
Referee: Wilson Mpanisi (Zambia)
4 April 2009
20:00 UTC+2

Supersport United (South Africa)	1 – 1	(Uganda) Kampala City Council FC
Mulondo Sikhwivhilu 57'		Anthony Bongole 79'

Super Stadium, Atteridgeville
Referee: Alex Simataa Tiyeho (Namibia)

Kampala City Council FC won 3 – 2 on aggregate and advanced to the Second round.

15 March 2009
17:00 UTC+1

Heartland (Nigeria)	3 – 1	(Morocco) FAR Rabat
Joshua Obaje 18' 53'; Stanley Okoro 44'		Mustapha El Allaoui 30'

Dan Anyiam Stadium, Owerri
Referee: William Agbovi (Ghana)
4 April 2009
15:00 UTC+0

FAR Rabat (Morocco)	1 – 1	(Nigeria) Heartland
Mohamed Madihi 37'		Signs Chibambo 67'

Stade Moulay Abdellah, Rabat
Referee: Kokou Djaoupe (Togo)

Heartland F.C. won 4 – 2 on aggregate and advanced to the Second round.

15 March 2009

TP Mazembe (Democratic Republic of the Congo)	3 – 0	(Angola) Petro de Luanda
Patou Kabangou 17'; Trésor Mputu 43' 75'

Stade Municipal de Lubumbashi, Lubumbashi
Referee: Jerome Damon (South Africa)
4 April 2009

Petro de Luanda (Angola)	1 – 2	(Democratic Republic of the Congo) TP Mazembe
David Dinis Magalhães 90+2'		Trésor Mputu 16'; Dioko Kaluyituka 27'

Estádio da Cidadela, Luanda
Referee: Thapelo Disang (Botswana)

TP Mazembe won 5 – 1 on aggregate and advanced to the Second round.

14 March 2009
15:30 UTC+0

ASEC Mimosas (Ivory Coast)	2 – 0	(Burkina Faso) Etoile Filante Ouagadougou
Kouadio Pacôme 7'; N'Doua Irénée Kouakou 46'

Stade Félix Houphouët-Boigny, Abidjan
Referee: Emmanuel Imiere (Nigeria)
5 April 2009

Etoile Filante Ouagadougou (Burkina Faso)	0 – 1	(Ivory Coast) ASEC Mimosas
		Mangoua Kesse 52'

Stade du 4-Août, Ouagadougou
Referee: Crespin Aguidissou (Benin)

ASEC Mimosas won 3 – 0 on aggregate and advanced to the Second round.

15 March 2009
16:00 UTC+1

JS Kabylie (Algeria)	1 – 2	(Libya) Al Ahly Tripoli
Idrissa Coulibaly 79' (pen.)		Ahmed Saad 55'; Osama Fazzani 74'

Stade 1er Novembre, Tizi Ouzou
Referee: Osman Samir (Egypt)
4 April 2009
19:00 UTC+2

Al Ahly Tripoli (Libya)	1 – 0	(Algeria) JS Kabylie
Omar Daoud 39'

11 June Stadium, Tripoli
Referee: Aouaz Trabelsi (Tunisia)

Al Ahly Tripoli won 3 – 1 on aggregate and advanced to the Second round.

15 March 2009
15:00 UTC+0

Asante Kotoko (Ghana)	3 – 1	(Morocco) Ittihad Khemisset
Jordan Opoku 9'; Stephen Oduro 50'; Alexander Asamoah 85'		Hicham Fatihi 34'

Sekondi-Takoradi Stadium, Sekondi-Takoradi
Referee: Koman Coulibaly (Mali)
5 April 2009
15:00 UTC+0

Ittihad Khemisset (Morocco)	2 – 0	(Ghana) Asante Kotoko
Said Ait Bahi 46'; Rahhal El Khaddouri 81'

Stade du 18 novembre, Khemisset
Referee: Lemghambodj Ould (Mauritania)

Aggregate score 3 – 3. Ittihad Khemisset advanced to the Second round on the away goals rule.

14 March 2009
17:00 UTC+1

Étoile Sportive du Sahel (Tunisia)	2 – 1	(Algeria) ASO Chlef
Mehdi Ben Dhifallah 49'; Everson Da Silva 54'		Paul Emile Biyaga 14'

Stade Olympique de Sousse, Sousse
Referee: Mohamed Ragab (Libya)
3 April 2009
19:00 UTC+1

ASO Chlef (Algeria)	0 – 0	(Tunisia) Étoile Sportive du Sahel

Stade Mohamed Boumezrag, Chlef
Referee: Cheikh A. Tidiane Seck (Senegal)

Étoile Sportive du Sahel won 2 – 1 on aggregate and advanced to the Second round.

15 March 2009

Cotonsport (Cameroon)	2 – 1	(Gabon) AS Mangasport
Maikano Youssoufa 76'; Marcellin Gaha Djiadeu 90'		Mabide Kiney 65'

Roumdé Adjia Stadium, Garoua
Referee: Kokou Atsoo (Togo)
4 April 2009

AS Mangasport (Gabon)	2 – 3	(Cameroon) Cotonsport

Stade Henri Sylvoz, Moanda
Referee: Christopher Manuel (Zimbabwe)

Cotonsport won 5 – 3 on aggregate and advanced to the Second round.

14 March 2009
16:00 UTC+2

Ajax Cape Town (South Africa)	3 – 2	(Zimbabwe) Monomotapa United
Mabhuti Khenyeza 5' 8'; Brett Evans 59'		Edmore Chitato Charles Chiutsa 23'; Daniel Kamungenga 90'

Boland Rugby Stadium, Wellington
Referee: Dharmanand Roopnah (Mauritius)
5 April 2009
15:00 UTC+2

Monomotapa United (Zimbabwe)	2 – 1	(South Africa) Ajax Cape Town
Mtulisi Maphosa 14'; Charles Chiutsa 39'	Report	Granwald Scott 28'

Rufaro Stadium, Harare
Attendance: 3,000
Referee: Bruno H. M. Andriamiharisoa (Madagascar)

Aggregate score 4 – 4. Monomotapa United advanced to the Second round on the away goals rule.

15 March 2009
19:00 UTC+2

Al-Ahly (Egypt)	3 – 0	(Tanzania) Young Africans
Mohamed Barakat 1' 54'; Flavio Amado 20'

Cairo International Stadium, Cairo
Referee: Khalil Rouaissi (Morocco)
4 April 2009
15:00 UTC+3

Young Africans (Tanzania)	0 – 1	(Egypt) Al-Ahly
		Flavio Amado 6'

National Stadium, Dar es Salaam
Referee: Janvier Buregeya (Rwanda)

Al Ahly won 4 – 0 on aggregate and advanced to the Second round.

15 March 2009
20:00 UTC+3

Al-Hilal (Sudan)	3 – 1	(Réunion) US Stade Tamponnaise
Muhannad Eltahir 2' 84' (pen.); Ahmed Adil Hamad 27'		Eric Farro 29'

AlHilal Stadium, Omdurman
Referee: Alfred Ndinya (Kenya)
5 April 2009
16:00 UTC+4

US Stade Tamponnaise (Réunion)	2 – 1	(Sudan) Al-Hilal
Gael Payet 45'; 72'		Haitham Mustafa 58'

Stade Klébert Picard, Le Tampon
Referee: Antonio Massango (Mozambique)

Al-Hilal won 4 – 3 on aggregate and advanced to the Second round.

15 March 2009

Africa Sports (Ivory Coast)	0 – 0	(Zambia) ZESCO United

Stade Robert Champroux, Abidjan
Referee: Ibrahim Chaibou (Niger)
4 April 2009

ZESCO United (Zambia)	2 – 0	(Ivory Coast) Africa Sports
Maybin Mwaba 59' (pen.); Enoch Sakala 69'

Trade Fair Grounds, Ndola
Referee: Daniel Bennett (South Africa)

ZESCO United F.C. won 2 – 0 on aggregate and advanced to the Second round.

13 March 2009
17:30 UTC+2

Al Ittihad Tripoli (Libya)	1 – 1	(Sudan) Al-Merreikh
Mohamed Zubya 47'		Haytham Tambal 74'

11 June Stadium, Tripoli
Referee: Mohamed Bichari (Algeria)
4 April 2009
20:00 UTC+3

Al-Merreikh (Sudan)	3 – 0	(Libya) Al Ittihad Tripoli
Idahor 11' 27'; Raji Abdel-Aati 38'

Al Merreikh Stadium, Omdurman
Referee: Kalyoto Ngosi (Malawi)

Al-Merreikh won 4 – 1 on aggregate and advanced to the Second round.

== Second round ==
This is a knock-out stage of 16 teams that advanced from the first round; winners will advance to the group stage, with the losers advancing to the CAF Confederation Cup.

The first leg will be on 17–19 April and the second leg on 1–3 May.

19 April 2009
16:00 UTC+1

Primeiro de Agosto (Angola)	3 – 1	(Sudan) Al-Hilal
Bena 7' 10'; Mano 60'		Lelo Mbele 5'

Estádio da Cidadela, Luanda
Referee: Kacem Bennaceur (Tunisia)
3 May 2009
20:00 UTC+3

Al-Hilal (Sudan)	2 – 0	(Angola) Primeiro de Agosto
Muhannad Eltahir 45' (pen.); Lelo Mbele 74'

AlHilal Stadium, Omdurman
Referee: Kenias Marange (Zimbabwe)

Aggregate score 3–3. Al-Hilal advanced to the Group Stage on the away goals rule.

18 April 2009
16:00 UTC+1

Kano Pillars (Nigeria)	1 – 1	(Egypt) Al-Ahly
Victor Namo 32'	Report	Hany El-Agazy 75'

Ahmadu Bello Stadium, Kaduna
Referee: Jerome Damon (South Africa)
2 May 2009
20:30 UTC+3

Al-Ahly (Egypt)	2 – 2	(Nigeria) Kano Pillars
Flavio Amado 75'; Mohamed Barakat 86'	Report	Victor Namo 49'; Rabiu Mohamed 67'

Cairo Military Academy Stadium, Cairo
Referee: Muhmed Ssegonga (Uganda)

Aggregate score 3–3. Kano Pillars advanced to the Group Stage on the away goals rule.

18 April 2009
15:00 UTC+0

Djoliba (Mali)	0 – 0	(Zambia) ZESCO United

Complex Sportif Hérémakono, Bamako
Referee: Kokou Djaoupe (Togo)
2 May 2009
15:00 UTC+2

ZESCO United (Zambia)	2 – 1	(Mali) Djoliba
Lottie Phiri 66'; Enoch Sakala 76'		Sedonoude Janvier Abouta 43'

Trade Fair Grounds, Ndola
Referee: Emmanuel Imiere (Nigeria)

ZESCO United won 2–1 on aggregate and advanced to the Group Stage

17 April 2009
15:00 UTC+3

Kampala City Council FC (Uganda)	0 – 1	(Sudan) Al-Merreikh
		Endurance Idahor 54'

National Stadium, Kampala
Referee: Rajindraparsad Seechurn (Mauritius)
3 May 2009
20:00 UTC+3

Al-Merreikh (Sudan)	1 – 1	(Uganda) Kampala City Council FC
Endurance Idahor 62'		Brian Umony 80'

Al Merreikh Stadium, Omdurman
Referee: Djamel Haimoudi (Algeria)

Al-Merreikh won 2–1 on aggregate and advanced to the Group Stage

19 April 2009
16:00 UTC+1

Heartland (Nigeria)	2 – 1	(Cameroon) Cotonsport
Stanley Okoro 21'; Emeka Nwanna 60'		Ahmadou Ngomna 56'

Dan Anyiam Stadium, Owerri
Referee: Badara Diatta (Senegal)
3 May 2009
15:30 UTC+1

Cotonsport (Cameroon)	1 – 1	(Nigeria) Heartland
Salif Keita 45'		Ike Thankgod 42'

Roumdé Adjia Stadium, Garoua
Referee: Koman Coulibaly (Mali)

Heartland won 3–2 on aggregate and advanced to the Group Stage.

19 April 2009
15:30 UTC+2

TP Mazembe (Democratic Republic of the Congo)	1 – 0	(Morocco) Ittihad Khemisset
Dioko Kaluyituka 20' (pen.)

Stade Municipal de Lubumbashi, Lubumbashi
Referee: Wellington Kaoma (Zambia)
3 May 2009
16:00 UTC+0

Ittihad Khemisset (Morocco)	0 – 0	(Democratic Republic of the Congo) TP Mazembe

Stade du 18 novembre, Khemisset
Referee: Coffi Codjia (Benin)

TP Mazembe won 1–0 on aggregate and advanced to the Group Stage

19 April 2009
16:00 UTC+0

ASEC Mimosas (Ivory Coast)	1 – 0	(Zimbabwe) Monomotapa United
Pacome Kouassi 49' (pen.)

Stade Félix Houphouët-Boigny, Abidjan
Referee: Abdellah El Achiri (Morocco)
3 May 2009
16:00 UTC+3

Monomotapa United (Zimbabwe)	2 – 0	(Ivory Coast) ASEC Mimosas
Charles Chiutsa 5'; Daniel Kamungenga 90'

Rufaro Stadium, Harare
Referee: Divine Evehe (Cameroon)

Monomotapa United won 2–1 on aggregate and advanced to the Group Stage

18 April 2009
19:00 UTC+2

Al Ahly Tripoli (Libya)	0 – 0	(Tunisia) Étoile Sportive du Sahel

June 11 Stadium, Tripoli
Referee: Yakhouba Keita (Guinea)
2 May 2009
18:00 UTC+2

Étoile Sportive du Sahel (Tunisia)	2 – 0	(Libya) Al Ahly Tripoli
Sadat Bukari 16'; Ammar Jemal 44'

Stade Olympique de Sousse, Sousse
Referee: Khalid Abdel Rahman (Sudan)

Étoile Sportive du Sahel won 2–0 on aggregate and advanced to the Group Stage
