= 2009 CAF Champions League group stage =

- Dates: 18 July – 20 September 2009

Tournament statistics
- Matches played: 24
- Goals scored: 60 (2.5 per match)

The group stage of the 2009 CAF Champions League was played from 18 July to 20 September 2009. A total of eight teams competed in the group stage, the group winners and runners-up advance to the Knockout stage playing semifinal rounds before the final.

== Format ==
In the group stage, each group was played on a home-and-away round-robin basis. The winners and the runners-up of each group advanced to the Knockout stage.

== Groups ==
Key to colours in group tables
Group winners and runners-up advance to the Knockout stage

=== Group A ===
Pos	Team	Pld	W	D	L	GF	GA	GD	Pts	Qualification
1	(Nigeria) Kano Pillars	6	3	2	1	10	8	+2	11	Advance to knockout stage
2	(Sudan) Al-Hilal	6	3	1	2	7	5	+2	10	Advance to knockout stage
3	(Zambia) ZESCO United	6	2	2	2	8	7	+1	8	
4	(Sudan) Al-Merreikh	6	0	3	3	5	10	−5	3	

18 July 2009
14:30 UTC+2

ZESCO United (Zambia)	1–1	(Nigeria) Kano Pillars
Rodgers Kamwandi 44'		Hillary Chukwu 77'

Trade Fair Grounds, Ndola
18 July 2009
19:00 UTC+3

Al-Merreikh (Sudan)	0–0	(Sudan) Al-Hilal

Al Merreikh Stadium, Omdurman

31 July 2009
20:00 UTC+3

Al-Hilal (Sudan)	1–0	(Zambia) ZESCO United
Osama Ali Eltaawon 9'

Khartoum Stadium, Khartoum
1 August 2009
15:45 UTC+1

Kano Pillars (Nigeria)	3–1	(Sudan) Al-Merreikh
Victor Namo 18' 33'; Moses Ogaga 89'		Endurance Idahor 59'

Sani Abacha Stadium, Kano
Referee: Koman Coulibaly (Mali)

14 August 2009
20:00 UTC+3

Al-Hilal (Sudan)	2–0	(Nigeria) Kano Pillars
Muhannad Eltahir 55' (pen.); Hamouda Ahmed El Bashir 68'

AlHilal Stadium, Omdurman
Attendance: 42,000
Referee: Kenias Marange (Zimbabwe)
15 August 2009
19:00 UTC+3

Al-Merreikh (Sudan)	2–3	(Zambia) ZESCO United
Endurance Idahor 29' (pen.); Karim Eddafi 77'		Jonas Sakuwaha 5' 15' 34' (pen.)

Al Merreikh Stadium, Omdurman
Referee: Divine Evehe (Cameroon)

30 August 2009
14:00 UTC+2

ZESCO United (Zambia)	0–0	(Sudan) Al-Merreikh

Independence Stadium, Lusaka
Referee: Ragab Mohamed (Libya)
30 August 2009
15:45 UTC+1

Kano Pillars (Nigeria)	2–1	(Sudan) Al-Hilal
Gambo Mohammed 45+'; Moses Ogaga 73'	Report	Saif Eldin 20'

Sani Abacha Stadium, Kano
Referee: Jamel Ambaya (Libya)

11 September 2009
22:00 UTC+3

Al-Hilal (Sudan)	3–1	(Sudan) Al-Merreikh
Demba Barry 23'; Omer Bakheet 77'; Effosa Eguakon 85'		Bader Galag 64'

Al-Hilal Stadium, Omdurman
13 September 2009
16:00 UTC+1

Kano Pillars (Nigeria)	3–2	(Zambia) ZESCO United
Victor Namo 3' 55'; Bello Musa Kofarmata 86'		Loti Phiri 2' 39'

Sani Abacha Stadium, Kano

19 September 2009
14:30 UTC+2

ZESCO United (Zambia)	2–0	(Sudan) Al-Hilal
Enock Sakala 74'; Nicholas Zulu 79'

Independence Stadium, Lusaka
Referee: Joseph Lamptey (Ghana)
19 September 2009
22:00 UTC+3

Al-Merreikh (Sudan)	1–1	(Nigeria) Kano Pillars
Richard 21' (pen.)		Joseph Thompson 88'

Khartoum Stadium, Khartoum
Referee: Verson Lwanja (Malawi)

=== Group B ===
Pos	Team	Pld	W	D	L	GF	GA	GD	Pts	Qualification
1	(Democratic Republic of the Congo) TP Mazembe	6	4	0	2	11	4	+7	12	Advance to knockout stage
2	(Nigeria) Heartland	6	3	1	2	9	5	+4	10	Advance to knockout stage
3	(Tunisia) Étoile du Sahel	6	2	1	3	5	7	−2	7	
4	(Zimbabwe) Monomotapa United	6	2	0	4	5	14	−9	6	

18 July 2009
14:30 UTC+2

Monomotapa United (Zimbabwe)	2–1	(Tunisia) Étoile du Sahel
Daniel Kamungenga 2'; Darryl Nyanadro 65'		Ahmed Akaichi 51'

Rufaro Stadium, Harare
18 July 2009
17:00 UTC+2

TP Mazembe (Democratic Republic of the Congo)	2–0	(Nigeria) Heartland
Tresor Mputu 47'; Dioko Kaliyutuka 78'

Stade Municipal de Lubumbashi, Lubumbashi
Attendance: 32,300

1 August 2009
19:10 UTC+1

Étoile du Sahel (Tunisia)	2–1	(Democratic Republic of the Congo) TP Mazembe
Ammar Jemal 35' (pen.); Aymen Abdennour 63'		Mvete Luyeye 14'

Stade Olympique de Sousse, Sousse
Referee: Eddy Maillet (Seychelles)
2 August 2009
16:00 UTC+1

Heartland (Nigeria)	3–1	(Zimbabwe) Monomotapa United
Ike Thankgod 3'; Uche Agba 26'; Ikechukwu Ibenegbu 46'		Daniel Kamungenga 48'

Dan Anyiam Stadium, Owerri
Referee: Mohamed Benouza (Algeria)

15 August 2009
15:30 UTC+2

TP Mazembe (Democratic Republic of the Congo)	5–0	(Zimbabwe) Monomotapa United
Dioko Kaliyutuka 45' 71' 79'; Tresor Mputu 58'; Kabangu Mulota 66'

Stade Municipal de Lubumbashi, Lubumbashi
Referee: Amanuel Eyob (Eritrea)
16 August 2009
16:00 UTC+1

Heartland (Nigeria)	3–0	(Tunisia) Étoile du Sahel
Ikechukwu Ibenegbu 30'; Joshua Obaje 42'; Okey Nwabike 77'

Dan Anyiam Stadium, Owerri
Referee: Ousmane Karembe (Mali)

29 August 2009
15:00 UTC+2

Monomotapa United (Zimbabwe)	0–2	(Democratic Republic of the Congo) TP Mazembe
		Dioko Kaliyutuka 8'; Given Singuluma 90'

Rufaro Stadium, Harare
29 August 2009
22:00 UTC+1

Étoile du Sahel (Tunisia)	0–0	(Nigeria) Heartland
	Report

Stade Olympique de Sousse, Sousse

12 September 2009
16:00 UTC+1

Heartland (Nigeria)	2–0	(Democratic Republic of the Congo) TP Mazembe
Philip Obhafuoso 37'; Uche Agba 40'

Dan Anyiam Stadium, Owerri
12 September 2009
22:00 UTC+1

Étoile du Sahel (Tunisia)	2–0	(Zimbabwe) Monomotapa United
Mosaab Sassi 12'; Gilson Silva 55'

Stade Olympique de Sousse, Sousse

20 September 2009
14:30 UTC+2

Monomotapa United (Zimbabwe)	2–1	(Nigeria) Heartland
Daniel Kamunhenga 27'; Tawanda Nyamandwe 71'		Emmanuel Omobiabi 54'

Rufaro Stadium, Harare
Referee: Muhmed Ssegonga (Uganda)
20 September 2009
15:30 UTC+2

TP Mazembe (Democratic Republic of the Congo)	1–0	(Tunisia) Étoile du Sahel
Kanyimbo Tshizeu 36'

Stade Municipal de Lubumbashi, Lubumbashi
Referee: Kokou Djaoupe (Togo)
