= 2010 FIFA Club World Cup final =

- Event: 2010 FIFA Club World Cup
TP Mazembe	Internazionale
(Democratic Republic of the Congo)	(Italy)
0	3
- Date: 18 December 2010
- Venue: Zayed Sports City, Abu Dhabi
- Referee: Yuichi Nishimura (Japan)
- Attendance: 42,174
- Weather: Clear night 21 °C (70 °F); 68% humidity

The 2010 FIFA Club World Cup final was the final match of the 2010 FIFA Club World Cup, an association football tournament for the champion clubs from each of FIFA's six continental confederations. The match took place at the Sheikh Zayed Stadium, Abu Dhabi, on 18 December 2010, and pitted TP Mazembe of the Democratic Republic of the Congo, the CAF club champions, against Internazionale of Italy, the UEFA club champions. It was the first time that a club from outside Europe or South America was involved in contesting the final.

Inter won the final 3–0 over TP Mazembe. Goran Pandev and Samuel Eto'o scored two goals in the first half before Jonathan Biabiany scored the third goal in the 85th minute to secure the first title for Inter Milan.

== Road to final ==
(Democratic Republic of the Congo) TP Mazembe	Team	(Italy) Internazionale
CAF	Confederation	UEFA
Winner of the 2010 CAF Champions League	Qualification	Winner of the 2009–10 UEFA Champions League
Bye	Play-off round	Bye
1–0 (Mexico) Pachuca (Bedi 21')	Quarter-finals	Bye
2–0 (Brazil) Internacional (Kabangu 53', Kaluyituka 85')	Semi-finals	3–0 (South Korea) Seongnam Ilhwa Chunma (Stanković 3', Zanetti 32', Milito 73')

== Match ==
=== Details ===
18 December 2010
21:00 UTC+4

TP Mazembe (Democratic Republic of the Congo)	0–3	(Italy) Internazionale
	Report	Pandev 13'; Eto'o 17'; Biabiany 85'

Zayed Sports City, Abu Dhabi
Attendance: 42,174
Referee: Yuichi Nishimura (Japan)

TP Mazembe	Internazionale

GK	1	(Democratic Republic of the Congo) Robert Kidiaba
RB	4	(Democratic Republic of the Congo) Eric Nkulukuta
CB	13	(Democratic Republic of the Congo) Mbenza Bedi	(yellow card) 43'
CB	20	(Democratic Republic of the Congo) Mihayo Kazembe (c)
LB	3	(Democratic Republic of the Congo) Jean Kasusula	(yellow card) 84'
CM	2	(Democratic Republic of the Congo) Joël Kimwaki
CM	24	(Cameroon) Narcisse Ekanga	(yellow card) 33'
RW	11	(Democratic Republic of the Congo) Patou Kabangu
AM	10	(Zambia) Given Singuluma
LW	27	(Democratic Republic of the Congo) Ngandu Kasongo		(substituted off) 46'
CF	15	(Democratic Republic of the Congo) Dioko Kaluyituka	(yellow card) 12'	(substituted off) 90'
Substitutions:
MF	6	(Democratic Republic of the Congo) Déo Kanda		(substituted on) 46'
MF	8	(Democratic Republic of the Congo) Hervé Ndonga		(substituted on) 90'
Manager:
(Senegal) Lamine N'Diaye

GK	1	(Brazil) Júlio César
CB	2	(Colombia) Iván Córdoba
CB	6	(Brazil) Lúcio
CB	26	(Romania) Cristian Chivu		(substituted off) 54'
RM	13	(Brazil) Maicon
CM	19	(Argentina) Esteban Cambiasso
CM	8	(Brazil) Thiago Motta	(yellow card) 79'	(substituted off) 87'
LM	4	(Argentina) Javier Zanetti (c)
AM	27	(North Macedonia) Goran Pandev
CF	22	(Argentina) Diego Milito		(substituted off) 70'
CF	9	(Cameroon) Samuel Eto'o
Substitutions:
MF	5	(Serbia) Dejan Stanković		(substituted on) 54'
FW	88	(France) Jonathan Biabiany		(substituted on) 70'
MF	17	(Kenya) McDonald Mariga		(substituted on) 87'
Manager:
(Spain) Rafael Benítez

Assistant referees:
Toru Sagara (Japan)
Toshiyuki Nagi (Japan)
Fourth official:
Victor Carrillo (Peru)
Reserve assistant referee:
Jorge Yupanqui (Peru)

Match rules

- 90 minutes
- 30 minutes of extra time if necessary
- Penalty shoot-out if scores still level
- Twelve named substitutes
- Maximum of three substitutions

=== Statistics ===
Overall
	TP Mazembe	Internazionale
Goals scored	0	3
Total shots	16	9
Shots on target	5	6
Ball possession	44%	56%
Corner kicks	4	5
Fouls committed	21	9
Offsides	4	1
Yellow cards	4	1
Red cards	0	0

== See also ==
- Inter Milan in European football
