= 2009 CAF Champions League =

Tournament details
- Dates: 30 January – 7 November 2009
- Teams: 53 (from 40 associations)

Final positions
- Champions: (Democratic Republic of the Congo) TP Mazembe (3rd title)
- Runners-up: (Nigeria) Heartland F.C.

Tournament statistics
- Matches played: 101
- Goals scored: 302 (2.99 per match)
- Top scorer(s): (Democratic Republic of the Congo) Dioko Kaluyituka (8 goals)

The 2009 CAF Champions League is the 45th edition of Africa's premier club football tournament organized by the Confederation of African Football (CAF), and the 13th edition under the current CAF Champions League format. The winner will participate in the 2009 FIFA Club World Cup and the 2010 CAF Super Cup.

== Qualification ==
- 53 teams from 40 CAF member associations were entered officially in the 2009 CAF Champions League.
- The 12 highest ranked associations according to CAF 5-year ranking are eligible to enter 2 teams in the competition. For this year's competition, CAF used 2003–07 5-Year rankings in which 3 countries shared the 12th place – allowing 14 countries to enter a second team.
- Two other teams were entered after the official deadline and were placed in a special subsection on the draw.

Below is the qualification scheme for the competition. Nations are shown according to their CAF 5-year ranking – those with a ranking score have their rank and score indicated:

Association	Club	Qualifying method
Associations with two entrants (Ranked 1–12)
(Tunisia) Tunisia^{1} (1st – 45 pts)	Club Africain	2007–08 Tunisian Ligue Professionnelle 1 champion
(Tunisia) Tunisia^{1} (1st – 45 pts)	**Étoile du Sahel**	2007–08 Tunisian Ligue Professionnelle 1 runner-up
(Egypt) Egypt^{2} (2nd – 33 pts)	**Al Ahly**	2007–08 Egyptian Premier League champion
Nigeria (3rd – 29 pts)	Kano Pillars	2007–08 Nigerian Premier League champion
Nigeria (3rd – 29 pts)	Heartland	2007–08 Nigerian Premier League runner-up
Morocco (4th – 19 pts)	FAR Rabat	2007–08 Botola champion
Morocco (4th – 19 pts)	Ittihad Khemisset	2007–08 Botola runner-up
Ghana (5th – 13 pts)	**Asante Kotoko**	2007–08 Ghana Premier League champion
Ghana (5th – 13 pts)	Heart of Lions	2007–08 Ghana Premier League runner-up
Ivory Coast (6th – 11 pts)	**Africa Sports National**	2008 Côte d'Ivoire Premier Division champion
Ivory Coast (6th – 11 pts)	**ASEC Mimosas**	2008 Côte d'Ivoire Premier Division runner-up
Algeria (=7th – 9 pts)	**JS Kabylie**	2007–08 Algerian Championnat National champion
Algeria (=7th – 9 pts)	ASO Chlef	2007–08 Algerian Championnat National runner-up
Cameroon (=7th – 9 pts)	**Coton Sport FC**	2007–08 MTN Elite one champion
Cameroon (=7th – 9 pts)	Canon Yaoundé	2007–08 MTN Elite one runner-up
(South Africa) South Africa^{1} (=9th – 7 pts)	Supersport United	2007–08 Premier Soccer League champion
(South Africa) South Africa^{1} (=9th – 7 pts)	**Ajax Cape Town**	2007–08 Premier Soccer League runner-up
(Sudan) Sudan^{1} (=9th – 7 pts)	Al-Merreikh	2008 Sudan Premier League champion
(Sudan) Sudan^{1} (=9th – 7 pts)	**Al-Hilal**	2008 Sudan Premier League runner-up
Angola (11th – 4 pts)	Petro Atlético	2008 Girabola (XXX) champion
Angola (11th – 4 pts)	Primeiro de Agosto	2008 Girabola (XXX) runner-up
(Democratic Republic of the Congo) Congo DR^{1} (=12th – 3 pts)	DC Motema Pembe	2007–08 Linafoot champion
(Democratic Republic of the Congo) Congo DR^{1} (=12th – 3 pts)	**TP Mazembe**	2007–08 Linafoot runner-up
Libya (=12th – 3 pts)	**Al Ittihad Tripoli**	2007–08 Libyan Premier League champion
Libya (=12th – 3 pts)	Al Ahly Tripoli	2007–08 Libyan Premier League runner-up
Senegal (=12th – 3 pts)	AS Douanes	2008 Senegal Premier League champion
Senegal (=12th – 3 pts)	Casa Sport	2008 Senegal Premier League runner-up
Associations with one entrant (Fewer ranking points than the 12th CAF association)
Rwanda (=15th – 2 pts)	ATRACO	2007–08 Rwandan Premier League champion
Tanzania (=15th – 2 pts)	Young Africans	2007–08 Tanzanian Premier League champion
Zambia (=15th – 2 pts)	ZESCO United	2008 Zambian Premier League champion
Gabon (=18th – 1 pt)	AS Mangasport	2007–08 Gabon Championnat National D1 champion
Guinea (=18th – 1 pt)	Fello Star	2008 Guinée Championnat National champion
Zimbabwe (=18th – 1 pt)	Monomotapa United	2008 Zimbabwe Premier Soccer League champion
Burkina Faso	Étoile Filante	2007–08 Burkinabé Premier League champion
Burundi	AS Inter Star	2008 Burundi Premier League champion
Cape Verde	Sporting Clube da Praia	2008 Cape Verdean football Championships champion
Chad	Elect-Sport FC	2008 Chad Premier League champion
Comoros	Etoile d'Or	2008 Comoros Premier League champion
(Republic of the Congo) Congo	CARA Brazzaville	2008 Congo Premier League champion
(The Gambia) Gambia	Wallidan	2008 GFA League First Division champion
Guinea-Bissau	Sporting Clube de Bafatá	2008 Campeonato Nacional da Guiné-Bissau champion
Kenya	Mathare United	2008 Kenyan Premier League champion
Liberia	Monrovia Black Star	2008 Liberian Premier League champion
Madagascar	Academie Ny Antsika	2008 THB Champions League champion
Mali	Djoliba	2007–08 Malian Première Division champion
Mauritius	Curepipe Starlight	2007–08 Mauritian League champion
Mozambique	Ferroviário Maputo	2008 Moçambola champion
Niger	AS Police	2007–08 Niger Premier League champion
Réunion	US Stade Tamponnaise	2008 Réunion Premier League runner-up^{3}
Sierra Leone	Ports Authority F.C.	2007–08 Sierra Leone National Premier League champion
(Eswatini) Swaziland	Royal Leopards	2007–08 Swazi Premier League champion
Uganda	Kampala City Council	2007–08 Ugandan Super League champion
Zanzibar	Miembeni	2008 Zanzibar Premier League champion
Associations entered after the deadline
Equatorial Guinea (=18th – 1 pt)	Akonangui	2008 Equatoguinean Premier League champion
Central African Republic	Stade Centrafricain	2008 Central African Republic League champion

Italicised clubs withdrew without playing.
Bolded clubs received a bye in the preliminary round, entering the tournament in the first round.
Unranked associations have no ranking points and hence are equal 23rd (Malawi – ranked =18th – did not enter a champion this year).

^{1} The champions of Congo DR, South Africa, Sudan, and Tunisia were not given byes in the first stage although the runners-up were. Unlike European tournaments, seeding within the CAF draws is based on performance in continental tournaments only.
^{2} The 2007–08 Egyptian Premier League runner-up, Ismaily opted not to enter this competition, choosing instead to play in the 2008–09 Arab Champions League. The third-placed Egyptian side, Al-Zamalek were not allowed to replace them as the CAF Champions League regulations allow only national champions and runners-up to compete.
^{3} 2008 Réunion Premier League Champion, JS Saint-Pierroise, banned from African club competitions after withdrawing from the 2007 CAF Champions League.

== Qualifying rounds ==
=== Preliminary round ===
The preliminary round first legs were played on 30 January – 1 February, and the second legs on 13–15 February 2009.

Team 1	Agg.	Team 2	1st leg	2nd leg
Primeiro de Agosto (Angola)	7–3	(Republic of the Congo) CARA Brazzaville	5–2	2–1
Canon Yaoundé (Cameroon)	2–1	(Burundi) AS Inter Star	1–1	1–0
AS Douanes (Senegal)	4–1	(Sierra Leone) Ports Authority F.C.	3–1	1–0
Kano Pillars (Nigeria)	2–0	(Chad) Elect-Sport FC	2–0	0–0
Club Africain (Tunisia)	w/o	(Guinea-Bissau) Sporting Clube de Bafatá	–	–
Djoliba (Mali)	4–1	(Senegal) Casa Sport	4–0	0–1
Ferroviário Maputo (Mozambique)	2–3	(Uganda) Kampala City Council FC	2–1	0–2
Supersport United (South Africa)	8–2	(Mauritius) Curepipe Starlight	3–0	5–2
Heartland (Nigeria)	10–1	(Liberia) Monrovia Black Star	4–0	6–1
FAR Rabat (Morocco)	6–2	(Cape Verde) Sporting Clube da Praia	6–1	0–1
Petro Atlético (Angola)	6–0	(Eswatini) Royal Leopards	3–0	3–0
Étoile Filante (Burkina Faso)	4–3	(Ghana) Heart of Lions	2–0	2–3
Al Ahly Tripoli (Libya)	7–2	(Niger) AS Police	6–0	1–2
Ittihad Khemisset (Morocco)	w/o	(The Gambia) Wallidan	–	–
ASO Chlef (Algeria)	3–1	(Guinea) Fello Star	1–0	2–1
DC Motema Pembe (Democratic Republic of the Congo)	1–3	(Gabon) AS Mangasport	1–2	0–1
Monomotapa United (Zimbabwe)	3–2	(Zanzibar) Miembeni	2–0	1–2
Young Africans (Tanzania)	14–1	(Comoros) Etoile d'Or	8–1	6–0
Academie Ny Antsika (Madagascar)	0–6	(Réunion) US Stade Tamponnaise	^{1}	0–6
ZESCO United (Zambia)	5–1	(Kenya) Mathare United	2–0	3–1
Al-Merreikh (Sudan)	2–1	(Rwanda) ATRACO	2–1	0–0

^{1} Played over one leg after first leg cancelled due to political violence in Madagascar

=== Dispensation round ===
Two federations inscribed their clubs after the deadline, but were admitted for an intermediate round. However, the winning club could only gain access to the first round if another winning club from the preliminary round withdrew subsequently. The first leg was played on 22 February, and the second leg on 8 March 2009.

Team 1	Agg.	Team 2	1st leg	2nd leg
Stade Centrafricain (Central African Republic)	1–1 (4–5 p)	(Equatorial Guinea) Akonangui	1–0	0–1 (aet)

As no side withdrew from the first round, Akonangui were effectively eliminated as well.

=== First round ===
The first round first legs were played on 13–15 March, and the second legs on 3–6 April 2009.

Team 1	Agg.	Team 2	1st leg	2nd leg
Primeiro de Agosto (Angola)	1–1 (5–4 p)	(Cameroon) Canon Yaoundé	0–1	1–0 (aet)
AS Douanes (Senegal)	1–1 (a)	(Nigeria) Kano Pillars	1–1	0–0
Club Africain (Tunisia)	2–2 (a)	(Mali) Djoliba	1–2	1–0
Kampala City Council FC (Uganda)	3–2	(South Africa) Supersport United	2–1	1–1
Heartland (Nigeria)	4–2	(Morocco) FAR Rabat	3–1	1–1
TP Mazembe (Democratic Republic of the Congo)	5–1	(Angola) Petro Atlético	3–0	2–1
ASEC Mimosas (Ivory Coast)	3–0	(Burkina Faso) Étoile Filante	2–0	1–0
JS Kabylie (Algeria)	1–3	(Libya) Al Ahly Tripoli	1–2	0–1
Asante Kotoko (Ghana)	3–3 (a)	(Morocco) Ittihad Khemisset	3–1	0–2
Étoile du Sahel (Tunisia)	2–1	(Algeria) ASO Chlef	2–1	0–0
Coton Sport FC (Cameroon)	5–3	(Gabon) AS Mangasport	2–1	3–2
Ajax Cape Town (South Africa)	4–4 (a)	(Zimbabwe) Monomotapa United	3–2	1–2
Al Ahly (Egypt)	4–0	(Tanzania) Young Africans	3–0	1–0
Al-Hilal (Sudan)	4–3	(Réunion) US Stade Tamponnaise	3–1	1–2
Africa Sports National (Ivory Coast)	0–2	(Zambia) ZESCO United	0–0	0–2
Al Ittihad Tripoli (Libya)	1–4	(Sudan) Al-Merreikh	1–1	0–3

=== Second round ===
The first leg will be on 17–19 April and the second leg on 1–3 May.

Team 1	Agg.	Team 2	1st leg	2nd leg
Primeiro de Agosto (Angola)	3–3 (a)	(Sudan) Al-Hilal	3–1	0–2
Kano Pillars (Nigeria)	3–3 (a)	(Egypt) Al Ahly	1–1	2–2
Djoliba (Mali)	1–2	(Zambia) ZESCO United	0–0	1–2
Kampala City Council FC (Uganda)	1–2	(Sudan) Al-Merreikh	0–1	1–1
Heartland (Nigeria)	3–2	(Cameroon) Coton Sport FC	2–1	1–1
TP Mazembe (Democratic Republic of the Congo)	1–0	(Morocco) Ittihad Khemisset	1–0	0–0
ASEC Mimosas (Ivory Coast)	1–2	(Zimbabwe) Monomotapa United	1–0	0–2
Al Ahly Tripoli (Libya)	0–2	(Tunisia) Étoile du Sahel	0–0	0–2

- The losing teams from the second round advance to the CAF Confederation Cup 2009

== Group stage ==
The draw for the group stage was held on 7 May in CAF headquarters in Cairo.

Étoile du Sahel and Al-Merreikh were seeded as level I, while TP Mazembe and Al-Hilal were seeded as level II.

Key to colours in group tables
Group winners and runners-up advance to the Knockout stage

=== Group A ===
Pos	Team	Pld	W	D	L	GF	GA	GD	Pts	Qualification	KAN	ALH	ZES	ALM
1	(Nigeria) Kano Pillars	6	3	2	1	10	8	+2	11	Advance to knockout stage	—	2–1	3–2	3–1
2	(Sudan) Al-Hilal	6	3	1	2	7	5	+2	10	Advance to knockout stage	2–0	—	1–0	3–1
3	(Zambia) ZESCO United	6	2	2	2	8	7	+1	8		1–1	2–0	—	0–0
4	(Sudan) Al-Merreikh	6	0	3	3	5	10	−5	3		1–1	0–0	2–3	—

=== Group B ===
Pos	Team	Pld	W	D	L	GF	GA	GD	Pts	Qualification	TPM	HEA	ETO	MON
1	(Democratic Republic of the Congo) TP Mazembe	6	4	0	2	11	4	+7	12	Advance to knockout stage	—	2–0	1–0	5–0
2	(Nigeria) Heartland	6	3	1	2	9	5	+4	10	Advance to knockout stage	2–0	—	3–0	3–1
3	(Tunisia) Étoile du Sahel	6	2	1	3	5	7	−2	7		2–1	0–0	—	2–0
4	(Zimbabwe) Monomotapa United	6	2	0	4	5	14	−9	6		0–2	2–1	2–1	—

== Knockout stage ==
=== Bracket ===
Semi-finals
1	(Nigeria) Heartland	4	1	5
4	(Nigeria) Kano Pillars	0	0	0
3	(Sudan) Al-Hilal	2	2	4
2	(Democratic Republic of the Congo) TP Mazembe	5	0	5

Final
(Nigeria) Heartland	2	0	2
(Democratic Republic of the Congo) TP Mazembe (a)	1	1	2

=== Semifinals ===
The first legs were scheduled for 4 October and the second legs for 17–18 October.

Team 1	Agg.	Team 2	1st leg	2nd leg
Heartland (Nigeria)	5–0	(Nigeria) Kano Pillars	4–0	1–0
Al-Hilal (Sudan)	4–5	(Democratic Republic of the Congo) TP Mazembe	2–5	2–0

=== Final ===
1 November 2009
16:00 UTC+1

Heartland (Nigeria)	2–1	(Democratic Republic of the Congo) TP Mazembe
Osanga 24'; Agba 80'	Report	Mputu 23'

Dan Anyiam Stadium, Owerri
Attendance: 10,000
Referee: Essam Abd El Fatah (Egypt)
7 November 2009
14:45 UTC+2

TP Mazembe (Democratic Republic of the Congo)	1–0	(Nigeria) Heartland
Omodiagbe 73' (o.g.)	Report

Stade Municipal de Lubumbashi, Lubumbashi
Attendance: 35,000
Referee: Mohamed Benouza (Algeria)

2–2 on aggregate. TP Mazembe won on the away goals rule.

== Top goalscorers ==
Rank	Name	Team	Goals
1	(Democratic Republic of the Congo) Dioko Kaluyituka	(Democratic Republic of the Congo) TP Mazembe	8
2	(Nigeria) Endurance Idahor	(Sudan) Al-Merreikh	7
3	(Nigeria) Victor Namo	(Nigeria) Kano Pillars	6
3	(Nigeria) Uche Agba	(Nigeria) Heartland	6
3	(Democratic Republic of the Congo) Trésor Mputu	(Democratic Republic of the Congo) TP Mazembe	6
6	(Sudan) Muhannad Eltahir	(Sudan) Al-Hilal	5
6	(Zambia) Enoch Sakala	(Zambia) ZESCO United	5
8	(Zimbabwe) Daniel Kamungenga	(Zimbabwe) Monomotapa United	3
8	(Zambia) Clifford Chipalo	(Zambia) ZESCO United	3
8	(Nigeria) Stanley Okoro	(Nigeria) Heartland	3
8	(Nigeria) Ike Thankgod	(Nigeria) Heartland	3
8	(Democratic Republic of the Congo) Kabangu Mulota	(Democratic Republic of the Congo) TP Mazembe	3

== Notes ==
- List of players and teams (1/16th finals): Champions League
