= 2009 CAF Champions League knockout stage =

The knockout stage of the 2009 CAF Champions League was played from 4 October to 7 November 2009.

== Bracket ==
Semi-Finals
1 | (Nigeria) Heartland | 4 | 1 | 5
4 | (Nigeria) Kano Pillars | 0 | 0 | 0
3 | (Sudan) Al-Hilal | 2 | 2 | 4
2 | (Democratic Republic of the Congo) TP Mazembe | 5 | 0 | 5

Final
(Nigeria) Heartland | 2 | 0 | 2
(Democratic Republic of the Congo) TP Mazembe (a) | 1 | 1 | 2

== Semi finals ==
The first legs were scheduled for 4 October and the second legs for 17–18 October.

| Team 1 | Agg. | Team 2 | 1st leg | 2nd leg |
|---|---|---|---|---|
| Heartland (Nigeria) | 5–0 | (Nigeria) Kano Pillars | 4–0 | 1–0 |
| Al-Hilal (Sudan) | 4–5 | (Democratic Republic of the Congo) TP Mazembe | 2–5 | 2–0 |

4 October 2009
16:00 UTC+1

| Heartland (Nigeria) | 4–0 | (Nigeria) Kano Pillars |
|---|---|---|
| Emeka Nwanna 10' 34'; Uche Agba 18' 45' | Report |

Dan Anyiam Stadium, Owerri
Attendance: 10,080
Referee: Essam Abd El Fatah (Egypt)
10 October 2009
16:00 UTC+1

| Kano Pillars (Nigeria) | 0–1 | (Nigeria) Heartland |
|---|---|---|
| | Report | Uche Agba 89' |

Sani Abacha Stadium, Kano
Referee: Djamel Haimoudi (Algeria)

Heartland won 5–0 on aggregate.

4 October 2009
20:30 UTC+3

| Al-Hilal (Sudan) | 2–5 | (Democratic Republic of the Congo) TP Mazembe |
|---|---|---|
| Demba Barry 2'; Haitham Mustafa 8' | | Guy Lusadisu Basisila 6' 89'; Kabangu Mulota 13' 72'; Dioko Kaliyutuka 62' |

Al-Hilal Stadium, Omdurman
Referee: Koman Coulibaly (Mali)
18 October 2009
14:45 UTC+2

| TP Mazembe (Democratic Republic of the Congo) | 0–2 | (Sudan) Al-Hilal |
|---|---|---|
| | Report | Edward Sadomba 27', 36' |

Stade Municipal de Lubumbashi, Lubumbashi
Referee: Daniel Bennett (South Africa)

TP Mazembe won 5–4 on aggregate.

The Nigerian Football Federation requested the second leg of the Heartland – Kano Pillars semi final be rescheduled from 17 October due to preparations for the 2009 FIFA U-17 World Cup

== Final ==
| Team 1 | Agg. | Team 2 | 1st leg | 2nd leg |
|---|---|---|---|---|
| Heartland (Nigeria) | 2–2 (a) | (Democratic Republic of the Congo) TP Mazembe | 2–1 | 0–1 |

1 November 2009
16:00 UTC+1

| Heartland (Nigeria) | 2–1 | (Democratic Republic of the Congo) TP Mazembe |
|---|---|---|
| King Osanga 24'; Uche Agba 80' | Report | Tresor Mputu 23' |

Dan Anyiam Stadium, Owerri
Referee: Essam Abd El Fatah (Egypt)
7 November 2009
14:45 UTC+2

| TP Mazembe (Democratic Republic of the Congo) | 1–0 | (Nigeria) Heartland |
|---|---|---|
| Emmanuel Omodiagbe 73' (o.g.) | Report |

Stade Municipal de Lubumbashi, Lubumbashi
Referee: Mohamed Benouza (Algeria)

2–2 on aggregate. TP Mazembe won on the away goals rule.
