= Ndonga (disambiguation) =

Ndonga is a standardized dialect of the Ovambo language spoken in Namibia and parts of Angola.

Ndonga may also refer to:

- Ndonga Linena Constituency, an electoral constituency in the Kavango East Region of Namibia
- Hervé Ndonga (born 1992), a footballer from DR Congo
- ZANU - Ndonga, a Zimbabwe political party formed along with ZANU-PF when ZANU split
