= Omodiagbe =

- Gender: Male
- Language: Nigerian

Origin
- Origin: Esan
- Meaning: A child straightens the clan, or a child is the backbone of a clan
- Region of origin: South South, Nigeria

Omodiagbe is a Nigerian surname. It is a male name and of Esan origin, which means "A child straightens the clan, or a child is the backbone of a clan". Omodiagbe is a combination of three different words in the Esan dialect (language). The three words are:

- “ Omo” - meaning “child”
- “ dia” - meaning “to straighten”
- “ Ogbe” - meaning “clan” or “family”

The name Omodiagbe reflects the importance of children in societies and families.

== Notable individuals with the name ==
- Darlington Omodiagbe (born 1978), Nigerian footballer
- Emmanuel Omodiagbe (born 1985), Nigerian footballer
