= Yuichi Nishimura =

Japanese football referee (born 1972)

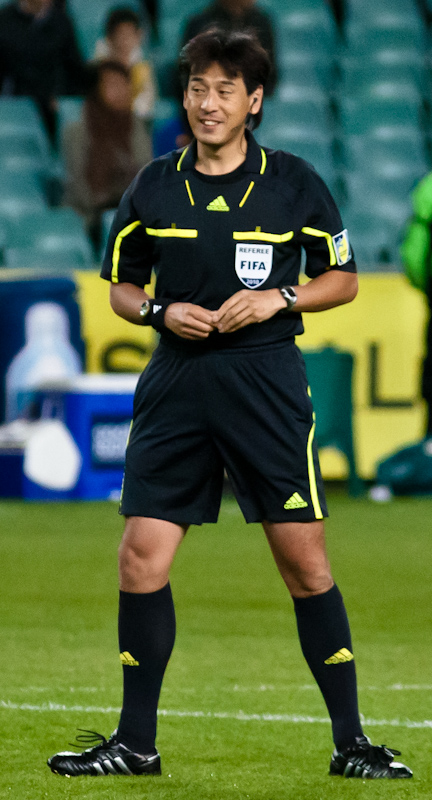
- Nishimura refereeing at Australia versus Oman in 2010
- Full name: Yuichi Nishimura
- Born: 17 April 1972 (age 54); Tokyo, Japan

Domestic
Years	League	Role
1999–	J. League Division 1	Referee

International
Years	League	Role
2004–2014	FIFA listed	Referee

Yuichi Nishimura (西村 雄一, Nishimura Yūichi; born 17 April 1972) is a Japanese football referee. He has refereed in the Japanese J. League Division 1 since 1999 and has been a full international referee for FIFA since 2004.

He refereed at the 2010 FIFA World Cup, where he was appointed to several prestigious matches, including as fourth official on the final. He also refereed the opening match of the 2014 FIFA World Cup between hosts Brazil and Croatia, and the second leg of the 2014 AFC Champions League final between Al Hilal and Western Sydney Wanderers.

== Career ==
Nishimura was the only Asian referee selected to officiate at the 2008 Africa Cup of Nations in Ghana along with assistant referees Toru Sagara from Japan and Jeong Hae-sang from South Korea.

Nishimura was appointed as the referee for four matches of the 2010 FIFA World Cup, including the quarter-final between the Netherlands and Brazil. He was also appointed to three matches as fourth official, including the final.

Nishimura refereed the 2010 FIFA Club World Cup final between Inter Milan and TP Mazembe.

On 13 November 2010, Nishimura was the referee for the 2010 AFC Champions League final between Seongnam Ilhwa Chunma and Zob Ahan, at the National Stadium in Tokyo.

Nishimura officiated at the 2007 and 2011 Asian Cups.

At the 2012 men's Olympic football tournament, Nishimura officiated the group stage matches between Brazil and Belarus and host Great Britain and Uruguay.

Nishimura was selected for his second World Cup in 2014. He refereed one match at the tournament.

The final match of his international career was the second leg of the 2014 AFC Champions League final between Al Hilal and Western Sydney Wanderers.

=== 2010 FIFA World Cup ===
Nishimura was preselected as a referee for the 2010 FIFA World Cup. He was the referee for the Uruguay against France game at the 2010 FIFA World Cup, along with fourth official Joel Aguilar and assistant referees Jeong Hae-Sang, and Toru Sagara. Nishimura produced the first red card of the tournament, when he sent Uruguay midfielder Nicolás Lodeiro off the field for two yellow cards. He was fourth official for the Honduras vs Chile match 5 days later. He refereed two further matches in the group stage (Spain vs Honduras and Paraguay vs New Zealand) and also refereed the first quarter-final game between the Netherlands and Brazil at Nelson Mandela Bay Stadium in Port Elizabeth. During that match, Nishimura sent off Felipe Melo of Brazil in the 73rd minute of the game. He was selected as the fourth official for the semifinal between Uruguay and the Netherlands and also for the final match of the World Cup, Netherlands vs. Spain.

=== 2014 FIFA World Cup ===
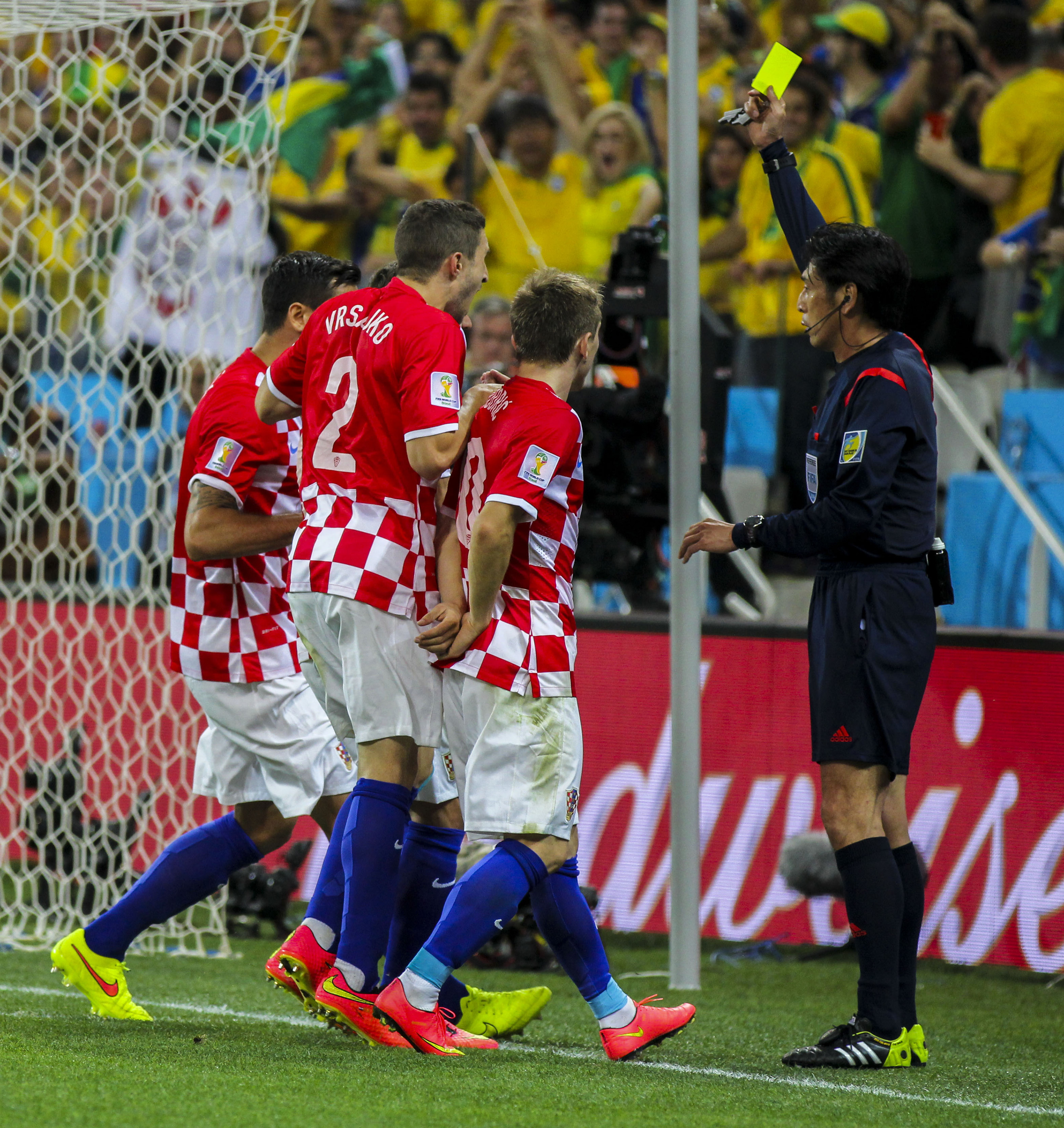
Nishimura (right) at the opening match

Nishimura was chosen by FIFA to referee the opening game of the 2014 FIFA World Cup between Brazil and Croatia. With this, he became only the third Japanese referee to officiate at two FIFA World Cups, after Shizuo Takada and Toru Kamikawa. In the match, Nishimura became the first referee to use vanishing spray at a World Cup finals, as well as to have access to goal-line technology. The game ended with a 3–1 victory for hosts Brazil. Nishimura was heavily criticized for his performance by many sources for multiple decisions that favored the home nation.

Nishimura then officiated two other games as the fourth official: the Group E match between Honduras and Ecuador (2–1 win for Ecuador), and the match for third place between Brazil and the Netherlands (3–0 win for the Netherlands).

== Awards ==
Nishimura was chosen as the J. League Referee of the Year in 2009 and 2010. In 2012, he was named Best Men's Referee of the Year by the Asian Football Confederation.

Preceded by (Mexico) Benito Archundia	FIFA Club World Cup final match referee 2010	Succeeded by (Uzbekistan) Ravshan Irmatov
Preceded by (Bahrain) Nawaf Shukralla	AFC Champions League final match referee 2014	Succeeded by (South Korea) Kim Jong-hyeok
