= Philip Obhafuoso =

Nigerian footballer

Personal information
- Date of birth: 3 March 1982 (age 44)
- Place of birth: Uromi, Nigeria
- Height: 1.85 m (6 ft 1 in)
- Position: Midfielder

Team information
- Current team: Heartland F.C.
- Number: 10

Senior career*
| Years | Team | Apps | (Gls) |
| 2000–2002 | FC Winterthur | 30 | (1) |
| 2002–2005 | FC Vaduz | 23 | (0) |
| 2005 | SC Kriens(loan) | 0 | (0) |
| 2005–2009 | Heartland F.C. | 64 | (1) |
| 2011– | USV Eschen/Mauren | 7 | (0) |
- * Club domestic league appearances and goals

Philip Obhafuoso (born 3 March 1982 in Uromi) is a Nigerian footballer, who currently plays for USV Eschen/Mauren.

== Career ==
Obhafuoso played from August 2002 to June 2006 by FC Vaduz and in 2003 in UEFA Cup with Vaduz, he played one season on loan with SC Kriens from July 2004 to June 2005. In July 2006 left Europe and Liechtenstein, he moved back to Nigeria to Heartland F.C. The midfielder left in summer 2011 Heartland F.C. and signed with the Liechtensteiner topside USV Eschen/Mauren.

== Personal life ==
His brother Uline played with him in Liechtenstein by USV Eschen/Mauren. With his brother and Andreas Gerster founded 2010 in Nigeria an youth football Academy.
