= Hervé Ndonga =

Congolese footballer (born 1992)

Hervé Ndonga Mianga (born 2 May 1992) is a Democratic Republic of the Congolese footballer, who currently plays for TP Mazembe as a midfielder.

== Career ==
Mianga played for TP Mazembe in the 2010 FIFA Club World Cup, coming on as a substitute in the final where they lost 3–0 to Internazionale.
