= Signs Chibambo =

Zambian football forward (born 1987)

Personal information
- Full name: Signs Wonder Chibambo
- Date of birth: July 17, 1987 (age 39)
- Place of birth: Kafue , Zambia
- Position: Striker

Youth career
- Nakambala Leopards F.C.

Senior career*
| Years | Team | Apps | (Gls) |
| 2007–2008 | Nakambala Leopards F.C. | | |
| 2008 | → ZESCO United (loan) | | |
| 2009–2010 | Heartland F.C. (23gls) | | |
| 2010–2011 | El-Masry | | |
| 2011–2013 | SQC Binh Dinh F.C. | | |
| 2013 | Hapoel Ra'anana | | |
| 2015–2016 | Nakambala Leopards F.C. | | |
| 2017 | NAPSA Stars F.C. | | |

International career
| 2007 | Zambia U-23 | | (1) |
| 2010 | Zambia | 3 | (0) |
- * Club domestic league appearances and goals

Signs Wonder Chibambo (born 13 October 1987 in Kafue) is a Zambian football forward.

== Career ==
Chibambo began his career with Nakambala Leopards F.C. and played for the club before being loaned in January 2008 to ZESCO United. After a half-year with ZESCO United, he returned to Nakambala Leopards, but was sold in April 2009 to Heartland F.C. In December 2010 left Nigerian side Heartland F.C. and signed with Egyptian Premier League club El-Masry.

== International career ==
He played for the under-23 team.
