= Mihayo Kazembe =

Congolese footballer (born 1976)

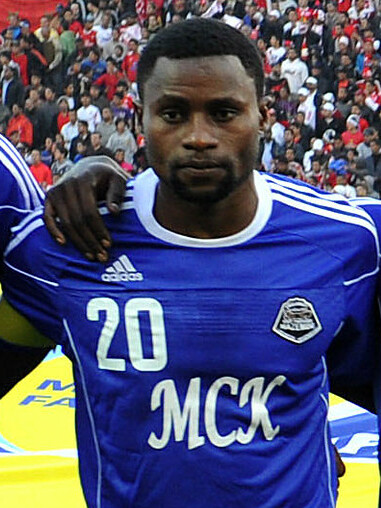
Mihayo Kazembe

Pamphile Mihayo Kazembe (born 17 September 1976 in Lubumbashi) is a retired Congolese footballer, who last played for TP Mazembe as a midfielder. He is currently the coach at TP Mazembe.

== Career ==
Mihayo played for TP Mazembe in the 2009 FIFA Club World Cup and captained them in the 2010 FIFA Club World Cup, where they reached the final losing 3–0 to Internazionale. In 2008, he had a trial with English Premier League side Arsenal FC.
