= Julius Ubido =

Nigerian footballer

Personal information
- Date of birth: 29 December 1984 (age 41)
- Place of birth: Nigeria
- Height: 1.76 m (5 ft 9 in)
- Position: Midfielder

Team information
- Current team: Warri Wolves

Senior career*
Years	Team	Apps	(Gls)
2007–2019	Heartland		
2019–	Warri Wolves		

International career^{‡}
2011	Nigeria	1	(0)
- * Club domestic league appearances and goals as of 12:55, 11 September 2019 (UTC) ‡ National team caps and goals as of 12:55, 11 September 2019 (UTC)

Julius Ubido (born 29 December 1984) is a Nigerian footballer who plays for Warri Wolves, as a midfielder.

== Career ==
Ubido has played club football in Nigeria for Heartland.

He made one international appearance for Nigeria in 2011.
