= King Osanga =

Nigerian footballer

Personal information
- Full name: King Moses Osanga
- Date of birth: {
- Place of birth: Jos, Nigeria
- Height: 1.82 m (6 ft 0 in)
- Position: Forward

Team information
- Current team: Plateau United

Senior career*
| Years | Team | Apps | (Gls) |
| 2006–2009 | Akwa United | 56 | (21) |
| 2009–2010 | Heartland F.C. | 34 | (11) |
| 2010–2012 | Étoile Sportive du Sahel | 42 | (18) |
| 2011 | → Al-Nasr Benghazi (loan) | 11 | (4) |
| 2011 | → Kaduna United (loan) | 16 | (6) |
| 2012–2013 | Sochaux | 1 | (0) |
| 2013–2014 | White Star Bruxelles | 13 | (4) |
| 2015–2016 | Shooting Stars | | |
| 2016–2017 | Ifeanyi Ubah F.C. | | |
| 2017– | Plateau United | | |

International career
| 2007 | Nigeria U-17 | 20 | (4) |
| 2009 | Nigeria U-20 | 22 | (5) |
- * Club domestic league appearances and goals as of 27 January 2018

King Moses Osanga (born 6 October 1990) is a Nigerian professional footballer who plays as a forward.

== Career ==
Osanga was born in Jos, Nigeria. He began his career in the youth side of Akwa United F.C., who were in 2007 promoted to the Nigeria Premier League.

On 28 July 2009, Osanga joined league rivals Heartland F.C. and returned after the 2009 FIFA U-20 World Cup to Heartland to play in the 2009 CAF Champions League final against TP Mazembe. Despite losing the Final on away goals, he received the Pepsi MVP Award.

In late November 2009 he was linked with a move to Tunisian club Étoile Sportive du Sahel, where he signed on 4 March 2010. After nine months, he left Etoile and signed for Libyan club Al-Ahly Benghazi, but after the 2011 Libyan civil war began he was loaned to Kaduna United F.C.

Osanga moved to Europe, playing for White Star Bruxelles in the Belgian Second Division. He signed with French side Sochaux in early 2012.

He returned to Nigeria and played for Ifeanyi Ubah of Nnewi before moving to Plateau in October 2017.

== International career ==
He was member of the Nigeria national under-17 football team at the 2007 FIFA U-17 World Cup in South Korea and the Nigeria national under-20 football team at 2009 FIFA U-20 World Cup in Egypt. He was called up to the senior team for the first time in August 2010 for a friendly in South Korea.

== Honours ==
- 2009: Pepsi MVP Award CAF Champions League
