= Stephen Owusu =

Ghanaian footballer (1982–2020)

Personal information
- Full name: Stephen Owusu
- Date of birth: 26 October 1982
- Place of birth: Prestea, Ghana
- Date of death: 24 October 2020 (aged 37)
- Place of death: Ghana
- Height: 1.82 m (6 ft 0 in)
- Position: Striker

Senior career*
Years	Team	Apps	(Gls)
2001	Mine Stars		
2002–2005	Asante Kotoko		
2006–2010	Heart of Lions		
2007–2008	→ Espérance Tunis (loan)		
2010–2012	Sharks F.C.		
2013–2014	Aduana Stars		
2015–2017	Tusker		

International career
2003	Ghana	1	(0)
- * Club domestic league appearances and goals

Stephen Owusu (26 October 1982 – 24 October 2020) was a Ghanaian footballer who played for Kenyan Premier League side Tusker as a striker.

He was born in Prestea on 26 October 1982. He was part of the team that won the 2016 Kenyan Premier League. He died on 24 October 2020 after a long illness at the age of 37.
