= Mor Diouf =

Senegalese footballer

Personal information
- Full name: Mame Mor Diouf
- Date of birth: 16 August 1988 (age 38)
- Place of birth: Dakar, Senegal
- Position: Central defender

Senior career*
Years	Team	Apps	(Gls)
2005–2009	AS Douanes		
2009–2012	Maritzburg United	99	(7)
2012–2015	SuperSport United	49	(3)
- Mbour Petite-Côte
- * Club domestic league appearances and goals

Mame Mor Diouf (born 16 August 1988) is a Senegalese professional footballer.

== Career ==
Diouf began his career with AS Douanes and joined South African club Maritzburg United in 2009. In 2012, he joined SuperSport United. In March 2013, he scored an 88th-minute winning goal from 70 yards (64 m) against Mamelodi Sundowns which was chosen as South Africa's goal of the season.
