= Mitko Dobrev =

Association football manager

Personal information
- Full name: Mitko Kostadinov Dobrev
- Date of birth: 26 February 1954 (age 72)
- Place of birth: Dimitrovgrad, Bulgaria

Youth career
- Years: Team
- 1970–1973: Dimitrovgrad
- 1973–1974: Svilengrad
- 1975–1976: Sportist Svoge
- 1977–1981: NSA Sofia

Managerial career
- 1982–1986: Dimitrovgrad
- 1986–1987: Hebros
- 1987–1988: Botev
- 1995–1998: PFC Haskovo
- 1998–1999: Olympic Teteven (executive director)
- 1999–2000: Bulgaria B
- 2002–2005: Svilengrad
- 2006–2007: Accra Hearts of Oak
- 2007–2009: Heartland
- 2009–2010: Lobi Stars
- 2013–2014: Ludogorets (technical advisor)
- 2015–2016: Ifeanyi Ubah
- 2016–2019: Ifeanyi Ubah (technical advisor)

Mitko Dobrev (Bulgarian: Митко Добрев) is a Bulgarian football manager. Mitko Dobrev attended the National Sports Academy "Vasil Levski" where he studied Physical Therapy and Coaching in 1977-1981. Mitko Dobrev holds an UEFA A Licence and is a part of the Bulgarian Football Union. Having managed mostly in Africa, he has expressed hopes that he will someday coach in Asia to diversify his coaching experience. Retired manager Ivan Vutsov helped Dobrev when he first went to Ghana to coach Accra Hearts of Oak F.C. the team had an unbeaten record of 22 matches and went on to become Champions of the Ghana Premier League in 2006-2007, Mitko Dobrev was awarded Manager of the Year Ghana.

== Managerial career ==
Dobrev managed a number of clubs in his homeland of Bulgaria before going to Africa.

While in charge of Hearts of Oak, he invaded the pitch, whereupon he was called up for a disciplinary hearing in 2007. It was in a game opposing Tema Youth. Heartland FC dismissed the Bulgarian tactician from his role in 2009, adducing differences with the management and a poor run of results as the reasons for his sacking.

In 2009, Mitko joined Lobi Stars F.C. of the Nigerian Premier League.

National sides such as Togo, Benin, Eritrea, and Uganda have shown interest in the 63-year old but financial conditions have not satisfied him.

=== Ifeanyi Ubah ===
Leaving Ifeanyi Ubah F.C. in 2015, he went to the Nigerian League Management Company to supplicate for assistance in making Ifeanyi Ubah give him a severance pay of 5000 US dollars.

Returning to Ifeanyi Ubah F.C. in 2016, he was convinced that they would secure qualification for the 2017 CAF Champions League. Instead, he guided his team to Ifeanyi Ubah's first Nigerian Federation Cup championship and met King Igwe Kenneth Onyeneke Orizu III who complimented his virtues as coach in the ceremony.

Dobrev has rejected rumours that he is leaving Ifeanyi Ubah F.C. in 2016 as he is still the technical advisor of the club.
