= Ike Ibenegbu =

Nigerian footballer (born 1986)

Personal information
- Full name: Bartholomew Ikechukwu Ibenegbu
- Date of birth: February 22, 1986 (age 40)
- Place of birth: Nigeria
- Height: 1.74 m (5 ft 9 in)
- Position: Midfielder

Team information
- Current team: Enugu Rangers
- Number: 10

Senior career*
Years	Team	Apps	(Gls)
2005–2006	El-Kanemi Warriors		
2007–2008	Enyimba		
2008–2014	Heartland		
2014–2016	Warri Wolves		
2016–2019	Enyimba		
2019–	Enugu Rangers		

International career^{‡}
2006–2009	Nigeria Beach Soccer	10	(5)
2012–	Nigeria	13	(6)
- * Club domestic league appearances and goals ‡ National team caps and goals as of March 1, 2013

Bartholomew Ikechukwu Ibenegbu (born February 22, 1986), nicknamed Mosquito, is a former Nigerian attacking midfielder who played for Enugu Rangers., Enyimba FC, Heartland FC, Warri Wolves and El Kanami FC before he retired as a professional footballer. He is currently based in USA to advance his coaching career

== Career ==
Before Heartland, he played for Enyimba F.C. and El-Kanemi Warriors, where he led the Nigerian Premier League in scoring in 2006 with ten goals.

== International career ==
Ibenegbu has played on the Nigeria national beach soccer team since 2006. He was called into the 2007 Under-23 camp before the Beijing Olympics but did not make the final team. He was called into camp for the senior team ahead of the 2010 African Cup of Nations, one of only three home-based players to make it. He made his debut as a substitute in the January 2012 friendly vs Angola.
