= Eric Nkulukuta =

Congolese footballer

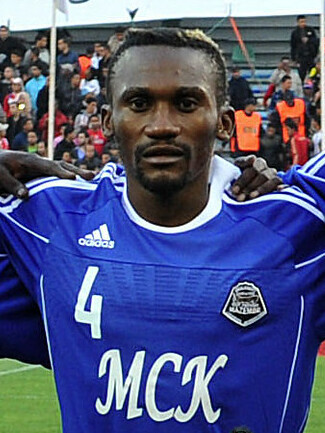

Eric Nkulukuta Miala (born 6 September 1982) is a Congolese former footballer who plays as a right-back.

== Club career ==
Nkulukuta was born in Kinshasa. He joined TP Mazembe from Daring Club Motema Pembe in 2006.

== International career ==
Nkulukuta played for the Democratic Republic of the Congo national team. He later played in a match against Nigeria in a 5–2 loss. Nkulukuta also played for the national team during qualifications for the 2006 World Cup.
