= 2010 FIFA Club World Cup =

FIFA Club World Cup UAE 2010 presented by Toyota كأس العالم للأندية لكرة القدم الإمارات العربية المتحدة 2010

Tournament details
- Host country: United Arab Emirates
- Dates: 8–18 December
- Teams: 7 (from 6 confederations)
- Venues: 2 (in 1 host city)

Final positions
- Champions: (Italy) Internazionale (1st title)
- Runners-up: (Democratic Republic of the Congo) TP Mazembe
- Third place: (Brazil) Internacional
- Fourth place: (South Korea) Seongnam Ilhwa Chunma

Tournament statistics
- Matches played: 8
- Goals scored: 27 (3.38 per match)
- Attendance: 200,251 (25,031 per match)
- Top scorer(s): Mauricio Molina (Seongnam Ilhwa Chunma); 3 goals
- Best player: Samuel Eto'o (Internazionale)
- Fair play award: (Italy) Internazionale

The 2010 FIFA Club World Cup (officially known as the FIFA Club World Cup UAE 2010 presented by Toyota for sponsorship reasons) was a football tournament that was played from 8 to 18 December 2010. It was the seventh FIFA Club World Cup and was hosted by the United Arab Emirates.

Defending champions Barcelona did not qualify as they were eliminated in the semi-finals of the 2009–10 UEFA Champions League by eventual champions Internazionale. African representatives TP Mazembe of DR Congo defeated South America's Internacional of Brazil in the semi-finals to become the first team from outside Europe or South America to reach a Club World Cup final. However, Mazembe were unable to pass the final hurdle, as they lost 3–0 to Internazionale in the final. It was Inter's third world title, having won the Club World Cup's predecessor – the Intercontinental Cup – in 1964 and 1965.

== Host bids ==
The FIFA Executive Committee appointed the United Arab Emirates as hosts for the 2009 and 2010 tournaments on 27 May 2008 during their meeting in Sydney, Australia. Other countries that placed bids were Australia and Japan. Portugal had initially placed a bid, but later withdrew from the process.

== Qualified teams ==
Location of teams of the 2010 FIFA Club World Cup

Internacional were the first previous winners to participate in another season of the Club World Cup.

Team	Confederation	Qualification	Participation (bold indicates winners)
Entering in the semi-finals
(Brazil) Internacional	CONMEBOL	Winners of the 2010 Copa Libertadores	2nd (Previous: **2006**)
(Italy) Internazionale	UEFA	Winners of the 2009–10 UEFA Champions League	Debut
Entering in the quarter-finals
(South Korea) Seongnam Ilhwa Chunma	AFC	Winners of the 2010 AFC Champions League	Debut
(Democratic Republic of the Congo) TP Mazembe	CAF	Winners of the 2010 CAF Champions League	2nd (Previous: 2009)
(Mexico) Pachuca	CONCACAF	Winners of the 2009–10 CONCACAF Champions League	3rd (Previous: 2007, 2008)
Entering in the play-off for quarter-finals
(Papua New Guinea) Hekari United	OFC	Winners of the 2009–10 OFC Champions League	Debut
(United Arab Emirates) Al-Wahda	AFC (host)	Winners of the 2009–10 UAE Pro-League	Debut

== Match officials ==
Confederation	Referee	Assistant referees
AFC	(Australia) Ben Williams	(Australia) Rodney Allen (Iran) Mohammadreza Abolfazli
AFC	(Japan) Yuichi Nishimura	(Japan) Toshiyuki Nagi (Japan) Toru Sagara
CAF	(South Africa) Daniel Bennett	(Cameroon) Evarist Menkouande (Morocco) Redouane Achik
CONCACAF	(Panama) Roberto Moreno	(Costa Rica) Leonel Leal (Panama) Daniel Williamson
CONMEBOL	(Peru) Víctor Hugo Carrillo	(Peru) Jonny Bossio (Peru) Jorge Yupanqui
OFC	(New Zealand) Michael Hester	(New Zealand) Jan-Hendrik Hintz (Tonga) Tevita Makasini
UEFA	(Netherlands) Björn Kuipers	(Netherlands) Berry Simons (Netherlands) Sander van Roekel

== Venues ==
Abu Dhabi was the only city to serve as a venue for the 2010 FIFA Club World Cup.

Abu Dhabi
Mohammed Bin Zayed Stadium	Zayed Sports City Stadium
24°27′09.95″N 54°23′31.27″E	24°24′57.92″N 54°27′12.93″E
Capacity: 42,056	Capacity: 50,000
Location of the host city of the 2010 FIFA Club World Cup.

== Matches ==
A draw was held on 27 October 2010 at the FIFA Headquarters in Zurich, Switzerland to decide the matchups for the two quarter-finals.

If a match was tied after normal playing time, 30 minutes of extra time would be played. If still tied after extra time, a penalty shoot-out would be held to determine the winner. However, for the fifth-place and third-place matches, no extra time would be played, and if tied the match would go straight to a penalty shoot-out to determine the winner.

Play-off for quarter-finals
8 December – Abu Dhabi (MBZ)
(United Arab Emirates) Al-Wahda	3
(Papua New Guinea) Hekari United	0

Quarter-finals
10 December – Abu Dhabi (MBZ)
(Democratic Republic of the Congo) TP Mazembe	1
(Mexico) Pachuca	0
11 December – Abu Dhabi (ZSC)
(United Arab Emirates) Al-Wahda	1
(South Korea) Seongnam Ilhwa Chunma	4

Semi-finals
14 December – Abu Dhabi (MBZ)
(Democratic Republic of the Congo) TP Mazembe	2
(Brazil) Internacional	0
15 December – Abu Dhabi (ZSC)
(South Korea) Seongnam Ilhwa Chunma	0
(Italy) Internazionale	3
Match for fifth place
15 December – Abu Dhabi (ZSC)
(Mexico) Pachuca (p)	2 (4)
(United Arab Emirates) Al-Wahda	2 (2)

Final
18 December – Abu Dhabi (ZSC)
(Democratic Republic of the Congo) TP Mazembe	0
(Italy) Internazionale	3
Match for third place
18 December – Abu Dhabi (ZSC)
(Brazil) Internacional	4
(South Korea) Seongnam Ilhwa Chunma	2

All times are local, GST (UTC+4).

=== Play-off for quarter-finals ===
8 December 2010
20:00

Al-Wahda (United Arab Emirates)	3–0	(Papua New Guinea) Hekari United
Hugo 40'; Baiano 44'; Jumaa 71'	Report

Mohammed Bin Zayed Stadium, Abu Dhabi
Attendance: 23,895
Referee: Daniel Bennett (South Africa)

=== Quarter-finals ===
10 December 2010
20:00

TP Mazembe (Democratic Republic of the Congo)	1–0	(Mexico) Pachuca
Bedi 21'	Report

Mohammed Bin Zayed Stadium, Abu Dhabi
Attendance: 17,960
Referee: Yuichi Nishimura (Japan)

11 December 2010
20:00

Al-Wahda (United Arab Emirates)	1–4	(South Korea) Seongnam Ilhwa Chunma
Baiano 27'	Report	Molina 4'; Ognenovski 30'; Choi Sung-Kuk 71'; Cho Dong-Geon 81'

Zayed Sports City Stadium, Abu Dhabi
Attendance: 30,625
Referee: Víctor Hugo Carrillo (Peru)

=== Semi-finals ===
14 December 2010
20:00

TP Mazembe (Democratic Republic of the Congo)	2–0	(Brazil) Internacional
Kabangu 53'; Kaluyituka 85'	Report

Mohammed Bin Zayed Stadium, Abu Dhabi
Attendance: 22,131
Referee: Björn Kuipers (Netherlands)

15 December 2010
21:00

Seongnam Ilhwa Chunma (South Korea)	0–3	(Italy) Internazionale
	Report	Stanković 3'; Zanetti 32'; Milito 73'

Zayed Sports City Stadium, Abu Dhabi
Attendance: 35,995
Referee: Roberto Moreno (Panama)

=== Match for fifth place ===
15 December 2010
18:00

Pachuca (Mexico)	2–2	(United Arab Emirates) Al-Wahda
Cvitanich 82', 89'	Report	Matar 44'; Khamees 77'
Penalties
Cvitanich (penalty scored); López (penalty scored); Muñoz (penalty scored); Luna (penalty scored)	4–2	(penalty scored) Hugo; (penalty scored) Saeed; (penalty missed) Jumaa; (penalty missed) Diarra

Zayed Sports City Stadium, Abu Dhabi
Attendance: 10,908
Referee: Daniel Bennett (South Africa)

=== Match for third place ===
18 December 2010
18:00

Internacional (Brazil)	4–2	(South Korea) Seongnam Ilhwa Chunma
Tinga 15'; Alecsandro 27', 71'; D'Alessandro 52'	Report	Molina 84', 90+3'

Zayed Sports City Stadium, Abu Dhabi
Attendance: 16,563
Referee: Michael Hester (New Zealand)

=== Final ===
18 December 2010
21:00

TP Mazembe (Democratic Republic of the Congo)	0–3	(Italy) Internazionale
	Report	Pandev 13'; Eto'o 17'; Biabiany 85'

Zayed Sports City Stadium, Abu Dhabi
Attendance: 42,174
Referee: Yuichi Nishimura (Japan)

== Goalscorers ==
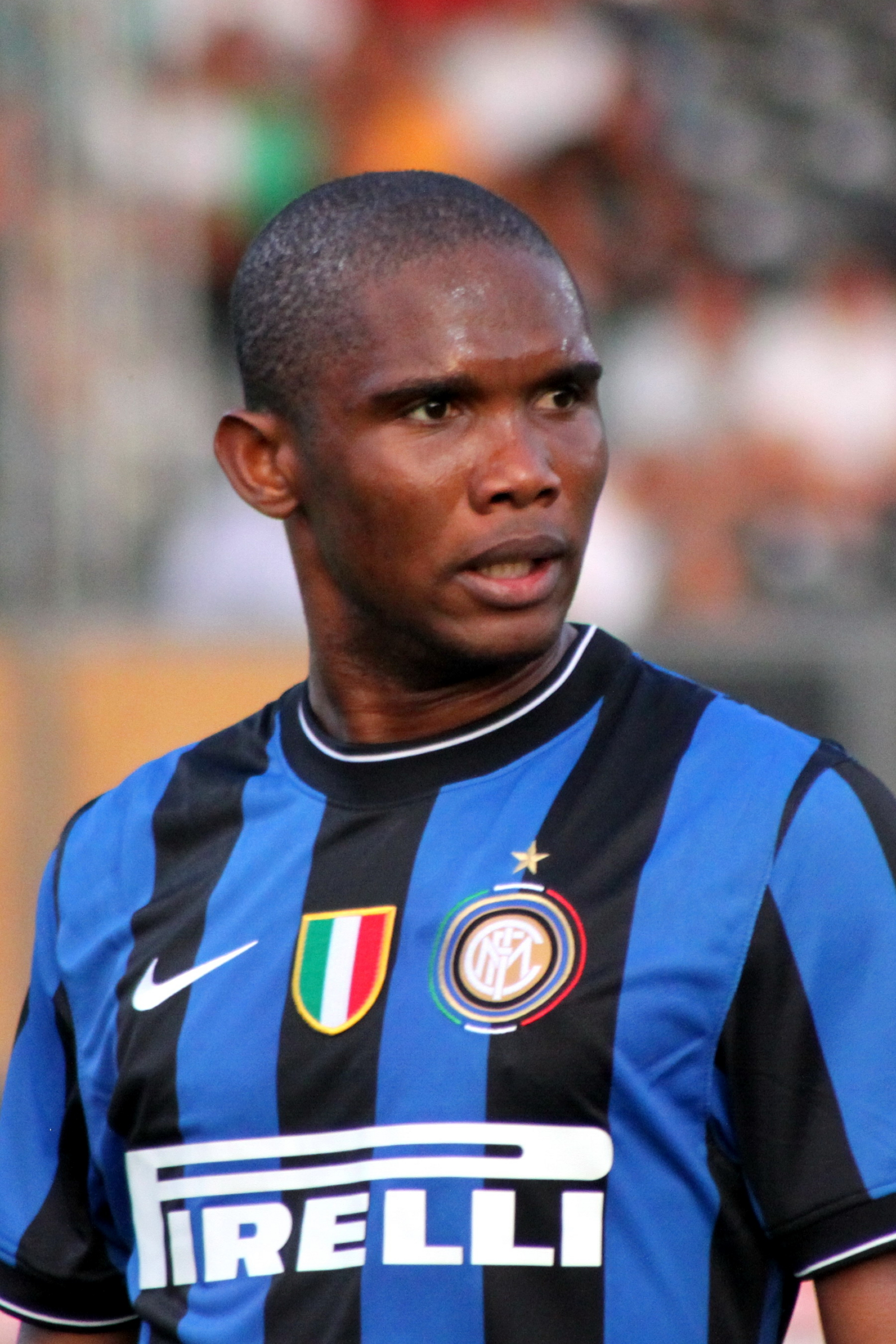
Samuel Eto'o, Golden Ball winner of the Club World Cup

Rank	Player	Team	Goals
1	(Colombia) Mauricio Molina	(South Korea) Seongnam Ilhwa Chunma	3
2	(Brazil) Fernando Baiano	(United Arab Emirates) Al-Wahda	2
2	(Brazil) Alecsandro	(Brazil) Internacional	2
2	(Argentina) Darío Cvitanich	(Mexico) Pachuca	2
5	(Brazil) Hugo	(United Arab Emirates) Al-Wahda	1
5	(United Arab Emirates) Abdulrahim Jumaa	(United Arab Emirates) Al-Wahda	1
5	(United Arab Emirates) Mahmoud Khamees	(United Arab Emirates) Al-Wahda	1
5	(United Arab Emirates) Ismail Matar	(United Arab Emirates) Al-Wahda	1
5	(Argentina) Andrés D'Alessandro	(Brazil) Internacional	1
5	(Brazil) Tinga	(Brazil) Internacional	1
5	(France) Jonathan Biabiany	(Italy) Internazionale	1
5	(Cameroon) Samuel Eto'o	(Italy) Internazionale	1
5	(Argentina) Diego Milito	(Italy) Internazionale	1
5	(North Macedonia) Goran Pandev	(Italy) Internazionale	1
5	(Serbia) Dejan Stanković	(Italy) Internazionale	1
5	(Argentina) Javier Zanetti	(Italy) Internazionale	1
5	(South Korea) Cho Dong-Geon	(South Korea) Seongnam Ilhwa Chunma	1
5	(South Korea) Choi Sung-Kuk	(South Korea) Seongnam Ilhwa Chunma	1
5	(Australia) Saša Ognenovski	(South Korea) Seongnam Ilhwa Chunma	1
5	(Democratic Republic of the Congo) Mbenza Bedi	(Democratic Republic of the Congo) TP Mazembe	1
5	(Democratic Republic of the Congo) Mulota Kabangu	(Democratic Republic of the Congo) TP Mazembe	1
5	(Democratic Republic of the Congo) Dioko Kaluyituka	(Democratic Republic of the Congo) TP Mazembe	1

== Awards ==
Adidas Golden Ball Toyota Award	Adidas Silver Ball	Adidas Bronze Ball
(Cameroon) Samuel Eto'o (Internazionale)	(Democratic Republic of the Congo) Dioko Kaluyituka (TP Mazembe)	(Argentina) Andrés D'Alessandro (Internacional)
FIFA Fair Play Award
(Italy) Internazionale
