= Victor Namo =

Nigerian footballer

Personal information
- Full name: Victor Namo
- Date of birth: November 3, 1988 (age 37)
- Place of birth: Jos, Nigeria
- Height: 1.89 m (6 ft 2 1/2 in)
- Position: Striker

Youth career
- Yobe Desert Stars

Senior career*
Years	Team	Apps	(Gls)
2006–2012	Kano Pillars		
2013	Nasarawa United		
2014–2016	Al Ahly Benghazi		
- * Club domestic league appearances and goals

Victor Namo (born 3 November 1988) is a Nigerian former footballer who played as a forward.

== Career ==
Namo began his career with Yobe Desert Stars and was in 2006 scouted from Kano Pillars F.C. He had trials in Vietnam and Israel in 2008. In October 2009, Victor was linked with Sudanese top clubs Al-Merreikh and Al-Hilal Omdurman.

After a successful career with Kano Pillars Football club where he played from 2006-2012 helping the club win its first Nigerian Premier League in 2007-08 and his goal scoring form helped in eliminating the likes of Al Ahly scoring both at home and away in that encounter at the CAF Champions League he finished the campaign with 7 goals that season. He left the club immediately after helping Kano Pillars secure its second League title in 2011-2012 season to Nasarawa United.

In his debut season at Nasarawa United, he does what he knows best which is finding the back of the net and finished the season as top scorer in the league with 19 goals.

In January 2014, Namo left Nigeria for Libyan Premier League giants Al Ahly Benghazi.

Namo joined Plateau United on a season loan and later retired from active football due to injury. In 2019/2020 Victor Namo got admission in Nigeria institute for sport (NIS) Abuja centre in a 3 month certificate course. Namo is currently working with mees palace academy jos as a coach/manager.

== Honours ==
Kano Pillars

- Nigerian Premier League: 2007-08, 2011-12

Individual

- Nigeria Premier League Top Scorer: 2013
