= Emmanuel Omodiagbe =

Nigerian footballer

Personal information
- Full name: Emmanuel Arewan Omodiagbe
- Date of birth: 19 October 1985 (age 41)
- Place of birth: Nigeria
- Height: 1.85 m (6 ft 1 in)
- Position: Midfielder

Team information
- Current team: Warri Wolves F.C.
- Number: 16

Senior career*
Years	Team	Apps	(Gls)
2005–2006	Bendel Insurance F.C.		
2006–2010	Heartland F.C.		
2010–	Warri Wolves F.C.		

International career
2008–	Nigeria		
- * Club domestic league appearances and goals as of September 24, 2007

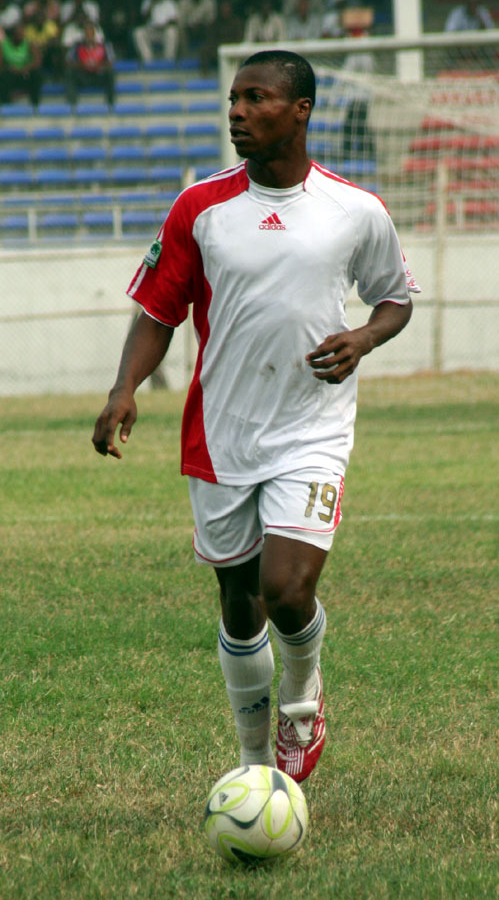

Emmanuel Arewan Omodiagbe (born October 19, 1985) is a Nigerian football offensive allrounder currently playing for Nigerian club Warri Wolves F.C.

== Career ==
In January 2006 he moved from Bendel Insurance F.C. to Heartland F.C. On 26 February 2009 with teammate Kabiru Alausa he joined CSKA Sofia where he was on trial with the club. However, the transfer fell through due to problems with the fee and the agent's share, so he returned to the Naze Millionaires. He joined Warri Wolves at the start of the 2010–11 season.
