= Essam Abdel-Fatah =

Egyptian football referee

Essam Abdel-Fatah (Arabic: عصام عبد الفتاح) (born December 30, 1965) is an Egyptian football (soccer) referee. Abd El Fatah has been a referee since 2001; his first international game was between Morocco and Sierra Leone in 2003. He was the referee for the match between Australia and Japan in the 2006 FIFA World Cup.

Abd El Fatah is a pilot in the Egyptian Army Air Force and he is currently a Lieutenant Major.
