= Monomotapa United F.C. =

Zimbabwean football club

Monomotapa United
- Full name: Monomotapa United Football Club
- Nickname: Monoz
- Founded: 2003; 22 years ago
- Ground: Rufaro Stadium, Harare, Zimbabwe
- Capacity: 35,000
- Chairman: Joseph Mukoki
- Manager: Clayton Munemo
- League: Zimbabwe Division 1
- 2013: 14th

Monomotapa United is a football club based in Harare, Zimbabwe. The club plays in the Zimbabwe Division 1.

== Honours ==
Zimbabwe Premier Soccer League

- Winners (1): 2008

Zimbabwe Northern Region Division 1

- Winners (1): 2004
