= Dioko Kaluyituka =

DR Congo footballer (born 1987)

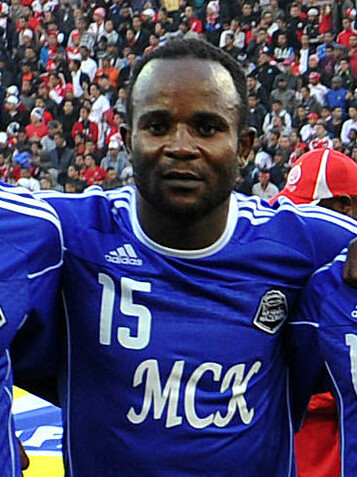
- Kaluyituka with TP Mazembe in 2011

Personal information
- Full name: Alain Dioko Kaluyituka
- Date of birth: 2 January 1987 (age 39)
- Place of birth: Kinshasa, Zaire
- Height: 1.75 m (5 ft 9 in)
- Position: Forward

Senior career*
| Years | Team | Apps | (Gls) |
| 2004–2006 | AS Vita | | |
| 2007–2011 | TP Mazembe | | |
| 2011–2015 | Al Ahli | 73 | (60) |
| 2012–2013 | → Al Kharaitiyat (loan) | 17 | (8) |
| 2015–2017 | Al-Gharafa | 15 | (5) |
| 2016 | → Lekhwiya (loan) | 9 | (5) |
| 2016–2017 | → Muaither SC (loan) | 8 | (5) |

International career^{‡}
| 2004–2013 | Congo DR | 30 | (9) |
- * Club domestic league appearances and goals as of 10 February 2023 ‡ National team caps and goals as of 16 August 2014

Alain Dioko Kaluyituka (born 2 January 1987) is a DR Congo professional footballer who plays as a forward. He has represented his country Congo DR 30 times, scoring 9 times. He has also represented his former club TP Mazembe in International football in both CAF Champions League and the FIFA Club World Cup.

== Club career ==
Dioko was born in Kinshasa and in 2004 was signed to Linafoot club AS Vita Club for whom he played for 2 years. He would then transfer to TP Mazembe in 2007, where he would immediately find success. He played for the club in the 2007 CAF Champions League in which they reached the final 16 qualification, before being knocked out by FAR Rabat. During the 2008 CAF Champions League he played for the club, but they were knocked out of Group B, finishing third overall. Their ultimate success came during the 2009 CAF Champions League, which Mazembe won. Dioko received the Golden Boot, having scored 8 goals. This meant that for the first time ever TP Mazembe qualified for the 2009 FIFA Club World Cup. Dioko was part of the squad that participated in the FIFA Club World Cup, where they found limited success, finishing 6th of 7.

He scored the second goal in the semifinal of the 2010 FIFA Club World Cup, where TP Mazembe defeated Internacional of Brazil 2–0 to become the first team outside Europe and South America to reach the FIFA Club World Cup final. He was awarded the Silver Ball at the tournament.

In 2011, Dioko signed a three-year deal with Al-Ahly Doha in Qatar, wearing the No.15 jersey that he already had in Mazembe. While finalizing the transfer, a dispute erupted between Mazembe and Al Ahly. FIFA ruled in favour of Al Ahly and declared the player eligible to play in the Qatar Stars League.

In July 2012, Dioko was loaned from relegated Al Ahly to Al Kharaitiyat on a season-long deal. He transferred to Al Gharafa in July 2015.

== International career ==
Dioko has represented DR Congo national football team 10 times, scoring 3 times. All of these matches were during the 2006 FIFA World Cup Qualifying.

== Club Career Stats ==
As of match played 20 December 2024

Appearances and goals by club, season and competition
| Club | Season | League | | | National cup | | CAF Champions League | | Other | | Total | |
| Club | Season | Division | Apps | Goals | Apps | Goals | Apps | Goals | Apps | Goals | Apps | Goals |
|---|---|---|---|---|---|---|---|---|---|---|---|---|
| mazembe | 2007 | Linafoot | | | | | 2 | 1 | 2 (Note: Appearances in CAF Confederation Cup) | 2 | | |
| mazembe | 2008 | Linafoot | | | | | 6 | 1 | | | | |
| mazembe | 2009 | Linafoot | | | | | 10 | 8 | 2 (Note: Appearances in FIFA Club World Cup) | 0 | | |
| mazembe | 2010 | Linafoot | | | | | 13 | 7 | 3 (Note: Appearances in FIFA Club World Cup) | 1 | | |
| mazembe | 2011 | Linafoot | | | | | 4 | 3 | 1 (Note: Appearance in CAF Super Cup) | 0 | | |
| mazembe | Total | | | | | | 45 | 20 | 8 | 3 | 156 | 61 |
| Al Ahli | 2011–12 | QSL | 21 | 13 | 2 | 3 | — | | 1 | 0 | 24 | 16 |
| Al Ahli | 2013–14 | QSL | 26 | 22 | 3 | 2 | — | | 2 | 0 | 31 | 24 |
| Al Ahli | 2014–15 | QSL | 26 | 25 | 1 | 0 | — | | — | | 27 | 25 |
| Al Ahli | Total | | 73 | 60 | 6 | 5 | 0 | 0 | 3 | 0 | 82 | 65 |
| Al Kharaitiyat | 2012–13 | QSL | 17 | 8 | 2 | 1 | 1 | 0 | 2 (Note: Appearances in GCC Champions League) | 3 | 22 | 12 |
| Al-Gharafa | 2015–16 | QSL | 15 | 5 | 0 | 0 | — | | — | | 15 | 5 |
| Al-Duhail | 2015–16 | QSL | 9 | 5 | 3 | 0 | 7 | 3 | 2 | 1 | 21 | 9 |
| Muaither | 2016–17 | QSL | 8 | 5 | 0 | 0 | — | | — | | 8 | 5 |
| Career total | | | 122 | 83 | 11 | 6 | 53 | 23 | 15 | 7 | | |

== International career Stats ==
Scores and results list DR Congo's goal tally first.

| No | Date | Venue | Opponent | Score | Result | Competition |
|---|---|---|---|---|---|---|
| 1. | 3 July 2004 | Estádio da Várzea, Praia, Cape Verde | Cape Verde | 1–0 | 1–1 | 2006 FIFA World Cup qualification |
| 2. | 9 May 2009 | National Stadium, Dar es Salaam, Tanzania | Tanzania | 1–0 | 2–0 | Friendly |
| 3. | 9 May 2009 | National Stadium, Dar es Salaam, Tanzania | Tanzania | 2–0 | 2–0 | Friendly |
| 4. | 7 October 2011 | Stade des Martyrs, Kinshasa, DR Congo | Cameroon | 1–0 | 2–3 | 2012 Africa Cup of Nations qualification |
| 5. | 11 November 2011 | Somhlolo National Stadium, Lobamba, Swaziland | Swaziland | 1–0 | 3–1 | 2014 FIFA World Cup qualification |
| 6. | 15 November 2011 | Stade des Martyrs, Kinshasa, DR Congo | Swaziland | 2–0 | 5–1 | 2014 FIFA World Cup qualification |
| 7. | 15 November 2011 | Stade des Martyrs, Kinshasa, DR Congo | Swaziland | 4–0 | 5–1 | 2014 FIFA World Cup qualification |
| 8. | 29 February 2012 | Stade Linité, Victoria, Seychelles | Seychelles | 1–0 | 3–0 | 2013 Africa Cup of Nations qualification |
| 9. | 29 February 2012 | Stade Linité, Victoria, Seychelles | Seychelles | 3–0 | 3–0 | 2013 Africa Cup of Nations qualification |

== Honours ==
TP Mazembe

- Linafoot: 2009
- CAF Champions League: 2009, 2010
- FIFA Club World Cup runner-up: 2010

Individual

- FIFA Club World Cup silver ball: 2010
- Qatar Stars League top goalscorer: 2013–14
- Qatar Stars League player of the month: November 2014
