= Patou Kabangu =

Democratic Republic of the Congo footballer (born 1985)

Personal information
- Full name: Patou Kabangu Mulota
- Date of birth: 31 December 1985 (age 40)
- Place of birth: Mbuji-Mayi, Zaire
- Height: 1.82 m (6 ft 0 in)
- Positions: Attacking midfielder; right winger

Team information
- Current team: Saint-Éloi Lupopo

Senior career*
Years	Team	Apps	(Gls)
2006–2007	SM Sanga Balende	30	(11)
2007–2013	Mazembe		
2012	→ Anderlecht (loan)	12	(3)
2013–2016	Al Ahli Doha	51	(4)
2017	Mazembe		
2018	Motema Pembe		
2018–2021	Mazembe		
2021–	Saint-Éloi Lupopo		

International career
2007–2014	DR Congo	11	(3)
- * Club domestic league appearances and goals as of 5 April 2017

Patou Kabangu (born 31 December 1985) is a Congolese professional who plays as a midfielder for Saint-Éloi Lupopo. He represented the DR Congo national team internationally.

== Career ==
Kabangu was born in Mbuji-Mayi and made his debut for the local football club SM Sanga Balende. In 2007 he moved to the Congolese club TP Mazembe. The team won the Congolese championship in 2009. In 2010 TP Mazembe won the final of the CAF Champions League, and qualified for the 2010 FIFA Club World Cup. On 14 December 2010, he scored the first goal of the semifinal of 2010 FIFA Club World Cup, where his former club TP Mazembe beat the Brazilian team Sport Club Internacional 2–0. TP Mazembe was the first team not from Europe or South America to play in the FIFA Club World Cup Final.

In January 2012 he signed for Belgian team Anderlecht. Having made several substitute appearances and scored a goal, he was released following the 2011–12 season.

On 30 June 2013, Kabangu joined Qatar Stars League side Al Ahli on a three-year deal.

He left TP Mazembe of the Linafoot in December 2017.

== Career statistics ==
Scores and results list DR Congo's goal tally first.

No.	Date	Venue	Opponent	Score	Result	Competition	Ref.
1.	5 September 2010	Stade Frederic Kibassa Maliba, Lubumbashi	Senegal	1–3	2–4	2012 Africa Cup of Nations qualification	
2.	5 September 2010	Stade Frederic Kibassa Maliba, Lubumbashi	Senegal	2–4	2–4	2012 Africa Cup of Nations qualification	
3.	5 June 2011	Stade Anjalay, Belle Vue	Mauritius	2–1	2–1	2012 Africa Cup of Nations qualification	

== Honours ==
TP Mazembe

- Congolese champions: 2007, 2009, 2011, 2012, 2013, 2017, 2019, 2020, 2021
- CAF Champions League: 2009, 2010
- CAF Super Cup: 2010, 2011
- FIFA Club World Cup runner-up: 2010
