= Heartland F.C. =

Nigerian association football club

Heartland FC
- Full name: Heartland Football Club
- Nicknames: Naze Millionaires, Spartans, Soccer Scientists, The Hearts
- Founded: 1976; 50 years ago
- Ground: Dan Anyiam Stadium; Owerri, Okigwe Stadium; Okigwe
- Capacity: 10,000
- Chairman: Emmanuel Amunike, MFR
- Manager: Emmanuel Amunike
- League: Nigeria National League
- 2025–26: Nigeria National League, 3rd of 10 (Conference A)
Home colours	Away colours	Third colours

Heartland Football Club, founded as Spartans F.C., later known as Iwuanyanwu Nationale from 1985 to 2006, is a Nigerian football club based in Owerri. The team play their home games at Dan Anyiam Stadium (and the Okigwe Stadium as their temporary home ground pending renovations at the Dan Anyiam Stadium). Their local rivals are Enyimba FC and Enugu Rangers, top teams co-located with Heartland in the same geo-political zone. They reached the finals of the 1988 African Cup of Champions Clubs and 2009 CAF Champions League, the premier African continental club tournament, and won four straight Nigerian league titles from 1987 to 1990.

Until their 18th place showing and first-ever relegation in 2016, they were one of two teams in the Nigerian top flight that had never been relegated.

== History ==
The club were founded as Spartans FC in 1976. Their first international match was a friendly played against Ararat Yerevan of the USSR which Spartans won 2–0 at the Township Stadium, Tetlow Road, Owerri, in August 1976. Spartans FC were supported by the Imo State government, which itself had been founded in 1976 following the creation of the state out of the then East Central State. The club was formed to recreate for the nascent state what Rangers FC had been to the old state, its source of pride on the Nigerian arena. Thus it was that it had the support of the state administration, including the state military. Spartans FC played matches at the Old Owerri Stadium.

=== Iwuanyanwu Nationale FC (1985–2006) ===
Spartans FC were renamed Iwuanyanwu Nationale FC in 1985 following a successful change of ownership from Imo State Government to chief Emmanuel Iwuanyanwu. Iwuanyanwu Nationale embarked on a 3-week training tour of Brazil in January 1986. That season, Nationale finished runner-up of the Nigerian top league.

The late 1980s were the most successful time in the club's history, when they won four straight championships from 1987 to 1990. During this time, the club featured several Nigerian national team players, such as Thompson Oliha, Benedict Iroha, and Uche Okechukwu.

Iwuanyanwu Nationale finally emerged as League winners in 1987 ahead of Leventis United on goal difference, the first of four straight championships. The league win earned them the right to represent Nigeria in CAF Champions Cup. In 1988, Iwuanyanwu Nationale repeated as League champions and completed the double as they won the Nigerian FA Cup for the first time, beating Flash Flamingoes of Benin 3–0 in the final. The club also reached CAF Champions Cup final, winning 1–0 in first leg tie in Ibadan, losing 4–0 in Constantine, Algeria in return leg versus Entente Setif.

In 1989, the Iwuanyanwu retained the league title but lost the FA Cup final 0–1 to BCC Lions. They played Stationery Stores of Lagos in Lagos in the first ever game of the newly professional Nigerian league and won 2–1, with Ben Iroha scoring the first goal. Nationale emerged as the first pro league winners in Nigeria.

The club's fortunes finally changed for the worse in 1991, when Nationale lost the league title to Julius Berger. The club also crashed out of CAF Champions Cup in the semifinals, losing to Nakivubo of Uganda 4–3 on aggregate, including a 1–1 draw at home where a win would have qualified them for the final.

Nationale won the league title again in 1993 following a 2–0 away victory over El-Kanemi Warriors in last league fixture to edge out Bendel Insurance to the title race. The 1993 team featured a young Nwankwo Kanu, who at the age of 16 scored 15 goals in 25 matches. Kanu would move on to Ajax after the 1993 season.

Tragedy struck Heartland in the champions league in 1994. Nationale reached the Champions Cup quarter-final, losing 3–0 to Espérance de Tunis of Tunisia in first leg tie, 18 September, in Algeria. Iwuanyanwu chartered an Oriental Airlines plane to fly home from Tunis the night of the game, but upon landing at Tamanrasset in southern Algeria, the plane hit a runway lamp and a fire truck and crashed. Two players, defender Aimola Omale and goalkeeper Uche Ikeogu, lost their lives in the accident, along with the pilots and a flight attendant. According to striker Tony Nwaigwe, the plane broke into three pieces on landing.

Due to the crash, the CAF shifted the return leg match in Owerri from 3 to 10 October. Nationale would draw the return match 1–1, failing to advance in the competition.

In the 1995 season, the first after the plane crash, Iwuanyanwu faced more adversity in the Nigerian domestic league. Led by manager Uche Ejimofor, Iwuanyanwu managed to survive a relegation battle by only a couple of games, which included a match which was replayed two times against 1994 champions BCC Lions, finally ending in a 1–1 draw.

1999 saw Iwuanyanwu win the league but they ended up losing the title to Lobi Stars of Makurdi in the inaugural Super League play-off. They also finished runners-up in the Nigerian F.A. Cup to Plateau United after breaking the hearts of city neighbors FC Arugo in the semifinals with a 2–1 victory. Arugo had just been set up in 1999 by former Iwuanyanwu manager Uche Ejimofor.

In 2000, Iwuanyanwu player Gabriel Anats died during the season from a tetanus infection.

In 2005, Iwuanyanwu finished third in Premier League and also in the Nigeria Federation Cup with coach Stanley Eguma in charge.

=== Heartland FC (2006–present) ===
On 7 February 2006, the Imo State Government re-acquired ownership of the club from Chief Emmanuel Iwuanyanwu and renamed it Heartland FC.

Heartland finished second in the 2008 Premier League by one point to Kano Pillars, earning a Champions League slot in 2009. Heartland would go on to make the finals of the 2009 CAF Champions League, losing to away goals to TP Mazembe after tying 2–2 on aggregate. Heartland won the first leg at home 2–1 but an own goal in the 73rd minute in the return leg in Lubumbashi meant the Nigerian side finished as runners-up.

After the club's failure to win the Champions League, they brought in Christian Chukwu as a technical consultant and Fan Ndubuoke as general manager. In 2011, the club won the Federation Cup, its first silverware since its last league win in 1993. Heartland defeated highly fancied Enyimba 1–0 thanks to a 40th-minute goal by their captain, Chinedu Efugh. Ramson Madu, a player on the 1993 cup winning team, was a member of the technical staff who won the 2011 cup, meaning he could celebrate winning as both a player and a coach. Heartland, however, could not replicate their success in the league, as they finished at mid-table.

Heartland defended its cup win in 2012 by defeating Lobi Stars 2–1 in the finals held at the Teslim Balogun Stadium in Lagos.

In 2013, Heartland were eliminated from the Confederations Cup due to a walkover against US Bitam of Gabon. Heartland had won the first leg 2–1 in Owerri, but were delayed leaving Nigeria due to visa and travel issues, and did not make it to Gabon in time for the match. Their protest was unsuccessful, and Bitam advanced in the competition.

The club was relegated from the Nigerian top division for the first time in 2016.

Heartland FC drew an average home attendance of 800 in the 2023–24 Nigeria Premier Football League.

=== First relegation To NNL ===
Ending 18th in the 2016 Nigeria Professional Football League ensured Heartland went on relegation for the first time since its 40-year existence. On the final day of the season, the team had abandoned their game against Plateau United in the 75th minute, after a goal which was to give them a 2–1 lead, was disallowed. Heartland was eventually penalized by the League Management for abandoning the match and 3 points and 3 goals was awarded to Plateau United. Heartland were also levied a fine of N3 million. The result of this meant that MFM FC would remain in the league at Heartland's expense.

They only spent a year at the second level under the leadership of Ramson Madu as the coach and players such as the prolific Stikers like Moses Akinade, Elvis Triax Chinedu Okoroafor, Francis Momoh helping them in winning the Southern division with a game to spare, ending on 61 points and 18 wins, 7 draws and 7 losses.

Later in August 2019, Heartland hired former MFM FC coach Fidelis Ilechukwu as its manager.

Sometime in the summer of 2024, in a bid to mitigate the recurring performance challenges the club had continued to experience in the last decade, Emmanuel Amunike, a former assistant coach of the Super Eagles and the 1994 African Footballer of the Year, was appointed as the new head coach of Heartland Football Club. Amunike was also given additional administrative reins of the club to oversee its operational running while doubling as the technical head coach.

== Honours ==
- Nigerian Premier League
  - Winners (5): 1987, 1988, 1989, 1990, 1993.
- Nigeria National League
  - Winners (1): 2023
- Nigerian FA Cup
  - Winners (3): 1988, 2011, 2012.
- Nigerian Super Cup
  - Winners (2): 2011, 2012.

== Performance in CAF competitions ==
- African Cup of Champions Clubs: 5 appearances

1988 – Finalist
1989 – Second Round
1990 – Semi-finals
1991 – Semi-finals
1994 – Quarter-finals

- CAF Champions League: 2 appearances

2009 – Finalist
2010 – Group Stage

- CAF Cup: 1 appearance

2000 – Semi-finals

- CAF Confederation Cup: 3 appearances

2006 – Group Stage
2012 – Second Round
2013 – First Round

=== Results in CAF competitions ===
Season	Competition	Round	Club	Home	Away	Aggregate
1990	African Cup of Champions Clubs	First Round	(Senegal) ASC Diaraf	3–0	0–1	3–1
1990	African Cup of Champions Clubs	Second Round	(Ivory Coast) Africa Sports	3–2	1–1	4–3
1990	African Cup of Champions Clubs	Quarter-finals	(Tunisia) Espérance	2–1	1–1	3–2
1990	African Cup of Champions Clubs	Semi-finals	(Zambia) Nkana Red Devils	0–1	0–1	0–2
1991	African Cup of Champions Clubs	First Round	(Sierra Leone) Old Edwardians	3–0	0–2	3–2
1991	African Cup of Champions Clubs	Second Round	(Gabon) JAC Port-Gentil	5–0	2–1	7–1
1991	African Cup of Champions Clubs	Quarter-finals	(Ivory Coast) ASEC Mimosas	3–0	0–3	3–3 (6-5p)
1991	African Cup of Champions Clubs	Semi-finals	(Uganda) SC Villa	1–1	2–3	3–4
1994	African Cup of Champions Clubs	First Round	(Niger) Zumunta AC	3–0	3–1	6–1
1994	African Cup of Champions Clubs	Second Round	(Cameroon) RC Bafoussam	1–2	3–2	4–4(a)
1994	African Cup of Champions Clubs	Quarter-finals	(Tunisia) Espérance de Tunis	0–3	1–1	1–4
2000	CAF Cup	First Round	(Gabon) Mbilinga FC	3–0	2–2	5–2
2000	CAF Cup	Second Round	(Egypt) Awassa City F.C.	2–1	1–1	3–2
2000	CAF Cup	Playoff Round	(Zambia) Nchanga Rangers	2–0	0–1	2–1
2000	CAF Cup	Semifinals	(Algeria) JS Kabylie	1–1	0–1	1–2
2006	CAF Confederation Cup	First Round	(Ivory Coast) JC Abidjan	2–0	0–0	2–0
2006	CAF Confederation Cup	Second Round	(Egypt) Haras El Hodood	3–2	0–0	3–2
2006	CAF Confederation Cup	Playoff Round	(Equatorial Guinea) Renacimiento FC	4–0	0–5	4–5
2009	CAF Champions League	First Round	(Morocco) FAR Rabat	3–1	1–1	4–2
2009	CAF Champions League	Second Round	(Cameroon) Coton Sport FC	2–1	1–1	3–2
2009	CAF Champions League	Group Stage	(Democratic Republic of the Congo) TP Mazembe	2–0	0–2	–
2009	CAF Champions League	Group Stage	(Zimbabwe) Monomotapa United	3–1	1–2	–
2009	CAF Champions League	Group Stage	(Tunisia) Étoile du Sahel	3–0	0–0	–
2009	CAF Champions League	Semifinals	(Nigeria) Kano Pillars	4–0	1–0	5–0
2009	CAF Champions League	Final	(Democratic Republic of the Congo) TP Mazembe	2–1	0–1	2–2(a)
2010	CAF Champions League	First Round	(Cameroon) Tiko United	1–1	2–2	3–3(a)
2010	CAF Champions League	Second Round	(South Africa) Supersport United	3–1	1–1	4–2
2010	CAF Champions League	Group Stage	(Egypt) Al Ahly SC	1–1	1–2	–
2010	CAF Champions League	Group Stage	(Egypt) Ismaily	2–1	0–1	–
2010	CAF Champions League	Group Stage	(Algeria) JS Kabylie	1–1	0–1	–
2012	CAF Confederation Cup	First Round	(Cameroon) Unisport Bafang	0–0	2–1	2–1
2012	CAF Confederation Cup	Second Round	(Republic of the Congo) AC Léopards	3–2	1–2	4–4(a)
2013	CAF Confederation Cup	First Round	(Gabon) US Bitam	2–1	–	w/o

1. US Bitam advanced to the second round after Heartland arrived late for the second leg, as per ruling made by the CAF.

== Current squad ==
As of 01 May 2023

Note: Flags indicate national team as defined under FIFA eligibility rules; some limited exceptions apply. Players may hold more than one non-FIFA nationality.

No.	Pos.	Nation	Player
1	GK	NGA	David Ezra
2	FW	NGA	Emmanuel Ibekwe
4	MF	NGA	Opara Chijioke
5	DF	NGA	Nnaemeka Anyanwu (captain)
6	DF	NGA	Chinedu Ozor
7	FW	NGA	Ebuka Okoro
8	MF	NGA	Olasunkanmi Quadri
10	MF	NGA	Nnamdi Egbujor
11	XX	NGA	Joel Okoro
12	MF	NGA	Tony Okemmiri
13	GK	NGA	Godwin Paul
14	DF	NGA	Christian Nkwo
15	DF	NGA	Ikwu Ejike
17	MF	NGA	Fabian Omaka
19	FW	NGA	Onyekachi Okafor
20	FW	NGA	Victor Makalala
21	FW	NGA	Ibe Chijioke

No.	Pos.	Nation	Player
22	GK	NGA	Chisom Chiagha
23	GK	NGA	Emmanuel Nwokeocha
24	MF	NGA	Izuchukwu Abugo
25	DF	NGA	Peters Afolayan
26	DF	NGA	Christian Molokwu
27	FW	NGA	Chukwuma Agor
28	DF	NGA	Olarenwaju Molade
29	MF	NGA	Chukwuma Nwankwo
30	GK	NGA	Kelvin Ogunga
32	MF	NGA	Temitope Akande
33	MF	NGA	Iyanda Tobi Ige
34	MF	NGA	Amoo Mumini
35	MF	NGA	Jeremiah Ndukwe
36	MF	NGA	Elvis Ori
38	FW	NGA	Kingsley Arum
39	MF	NGA	Christian Weli
42	FW	NGA	Prince Onuoha

== Former coaches ==
- (Nigeria) Uche Ejimofor (1985–1997)
- (Nigeria) Ossai Chukwuka
- (Nigeria) Kelechi Emeteole
- (Bulgaria) Mitko Dobrev (Aug 2007 – 9 Jan)
- (Nigeria) Ben Iroha (2009–??)
- (Netherlands) Lodewijk de Kruif (March 2010–??)
- (Nigeria) Samson Siasia (July –Dec 2010)
- (Nigeria) Christian Chukwu (interim) (Feb 2011 – 11 March)
- (Netherlands) Lodewijk de Kruif (2011–12)
- (Nigeria) Promise Nwachukwu
- (Nigeria) Ramson Madu (2016–2018)
- (Turkey) Mehmet Tayfun Türkmen
- (Nigeria) Fidelis Ilechukwu (2019–2021)
- (Nigeria) Erasmus Onuh (2021–2022)
- (Nigeria) Christian Obi (2022–2023)
- (Nigeria) Kennedy Boboye (Nov 2023-)
