= 2010 CAF Champions League qualifying rounds =

- Dates: 12 February – 28 February 2010

This page provides the summaries of the matches of the qualifying rounds for the group stage of the 2010 CAF Champions League.

== Preliminary round ==
This is a knockout stage of the 52 teams that did not receive byes to the first round.

First legs: 12–14 February 2010; Second legs: 26–28 February 2010.

13 February 2010

APR (Rwanda)	2 – 2	(Angola) Recreativo do Libolo
Twite Kabange 18'; Victor Nyirenda 85'	Report	Fuxito 53', 90'

Stade Amahoro, Kigali
Referee: Sylvester Kirwa (Kenya)
27 February 2010

Recreativo do Libolo (Angola)	0 – 1	(Rwanda) APR
	Report	Selly Rogba Didier 78'

Estádio Patrice Lumumba, Libolo
Referee: Matthew Dyer (South Africa)

APR won 3 – 2 on aggregate and advanced to the first round.

14 February 2010
14:00 UTC±0

Djoliba (Mali)	1 – 0	(Libya) Ahly Benghazi
Jean Goua 67'	Report

Complex Sportif Hérémakono, Bamako
Referee: Ousmane Fall (Senegal)
28 February 2010
19:00 UTC+2

Ahly Benghazi (Libya)	0 – 0	(Mali) Djoliba
	Report

March 28 Stadium, Benghazi
Referee: Gehad Grisha (Egypt)

Djoliba won 1 – 0 on aggregate and advanced to the first round.

13 February 2010

ASC Linguère (Senegal)	2 – 0	(Ghana) Asante Kotoko
Serigne Diouck 51'; Ahmeth Diallo 60'	Report

Stade de Linguère, Saint-Louis
Referee: Lemghambobj Ould (Mauritania)
28 February 2010

Asante Kotoko (Ghana)	2 – 0	(Senegal) ASC Linguère
Kabiru Imoro 33'; Isaac Amoako 51' (pen.)	Report
Penalties
	2 – 4

Baba Yara Stadium, Kumasi
Referee: Crespin Aguidissou (Benin)

Aggregate 2 – 2. ASC Linguère won the penalty shootout and advanced to the first round.

13 February 2010
16:00 UTC+3

Sofapaka (Kenya)	0 – 0	(Egypt) Ismaily
	Report

Nyayo National Stadium, Nairobi
Referee: Sheha Waziri (Tanzania)
27 February 2010
19:30 UTC+2

Ismaily (Egypt)	2 – 0	(Kenya) Sofapaka
Homos 54'; Abdallah Said 67'	Report

Ismailia Stadium, Ismailia
Referee: Adel El Raay (Libya)

Ismaily won 2 – 0 on aggregate and advanced to the first round.

13 February 2010
20:00 UTC+4

US Stade Tamponnaise (Réunion)	2 – 1	(Madagascar) Ajesaia
Johan Boulard 15'; Jean-Michel Fontaine 28'	Report	Lalaina Nomenjanahary 81'

Stade Klébert Picard, Le Tampon
Attendance: 993
Referee: Abdul Basit Ebrahim (South Africa)
28 February 2010

Ajesaia (Madagascar)	1 – 3	(Réunion) US Stade Tamponnaise
Kassah Voavy 14'	Report	Johan Boulard 8'; Mamoudou Diallo 64'; Mohamed El Magadarhi 67'

Mahamasina Municipal Stadium, Antananarivo
Attendance: 20,000
Referee: Jourdan Benstrong (Seychelles)

US Stade Tamponnaise won 5 – 2 on aggregate and advanced to the first round.

Africa Sports (Ivory Coast)	w/o	Benin 1

Africa Sports advanced to the first round after the Benin representative was withdrawn.

14 February 2010
16:30 UTC±0

Fello Star (Guinea)	1 – 3	(Morocco) Raja Casablanca
Alpha Oumar Diallo 89'	Report	Omar Najdi 11'; Dia Cire 72'; Mohamed Traore 76' (o.g.)

Stade du 28 Septembre, Conakry
Referee: E. Billy Parkinson (Sierra Leone)
28 February 2010
17:00 UTC±0

Raja Casablanca (Morocco)	1 – 1	(Guinea) Fello Star
Omar Najdi 16'	Report	Abass Cisse 90'

Stade Mohamed V, Casablanca
Referee: Slim Jedidi (Tunisia)

Raja Casablanca won 4 –2 on aggregate and advanced to the first round.

14 February 2010
15:30 UTC+1

Elá Nguema (Equatorial Guinea)	2 – 3	(Angola) Petro de Luanda
Cassoma 68' (o.g.); Ibrahim Touré 73' (pen.)	Report	Santana 15', 90'; Mabiná 18'

Estadio Internacional, Malabo
Referee: Kalla H.D. Mouandjo (Cameroon)
28 February 2010
16:00 UTC+1

Petro de Luanda (Angola)	6 – 1	(Equatorial Guinea) Elá Nguema
Ntui Etah Michel 33'; Yamba Asha 51'; Joka 57', 64', 80'; Job 86'	Report	Valentin Eyama 86'

Estádio 11 de Novembro, Luanda
Referee: Joshua Bondo (Botswana)

Petro de Luanda won 9 – 3 on aggregate and advanced to the first round.

14 February 2010

Sahel SC (Niger)	2 – 1	(Tunisia) Club Africain
Ibrahim Ba Amadou 29'; Abubakart Abdul-Latif 41'	Report	Mohamed Traore 88'

Stade Général Seyni Kountché, Niamey
Referee: Solomon Wokoma (Nigeria)
26 February 2010
19:00 UTC+1

Club Africain (Tunisia)	1 – 0	(Niger) Sahel SC
Khaled Melliti 41'	Report

Stade El Menzah, Tunis
Referee: Mohamed Bichari (Algeria)

Aggregate 2 – 2. Club Africain advanced on the away goals rule to the first round.

13 February 2010
14:00 UTC±0

Armed Forces (The Gambia)	1 – 2	(Algeria) JS Kabylie
Samir Hadjaoui 85' (o.g.)	Report	Farès Hamiti 48'; Mohamed Amine Aoudia 56'

Independence Stadium, Bakau
Referee: Abdellah El Achiri (Morocco)
27 February 2010
15:00 UTC+1

JS Kabylie (Algeria)	3 – 0	(The Gambia) Armed Forces
Nassim Oussalah 24'; Mohamed Rabie Meftah 53' (pen.); Mohamed Seguer 83'	Report

Stade 1er Novembre, Tizi Ouzou
Referee: Ousmane Sidibe (Mali)

JS Kabylie won 5 – 1 on aggregate and advanced to the first round.

14 February 2010

Gazelle FC (Chad)	1 – 0	(Nigeria) Bayelsa United
Henri Djikoloum 24'	Report

Stade Nacional, N'Djamena
Referee: Sosthene Ngbokaye (Central African Republic)
28 February 2010

Bayelsa United (Nigeria)	2 – 2	(Chad) Gazelle FC
Gbemi Akinrolabu 43'; Mannir Ubale 69' (pen.)	Report	Greyanda Fiacre 24'; Madalngue Cesar 89' (pen.)

Samson Siasia Stadium, Yenagoa
Referee: A. Mario Bangoura (Guinea)

Gazelle FC won 3 – 2 on aggregate and advanced to the first round.

14 February 2010
16:00 UTC+3

Saint-George SA (Ethiopia)	1 – 1	(Sudan) Al-Merreikh
Mohammed Naser 75'	Report	Abdelhamid Ammari 19'

Addis Abeba Stadium, Addis Abeba
Referee: F.M. Kayindi-Ngobi (Uganda)
27 February 2010
20:00 UTC+3

Al-Merreikh (Sudan)	3 – 1	(Ethiopia) Saint-George SA
Abdelhamid Ammari 45', 83'; Endurance Idahor 53'	Report	Adane Girma 35'

Al Merreikh Stadium, Omdurman
Referee: Thomas Onyango (Kenya)

Al-Merreikh won 4 – 2 on aggregate and advanced to the first round.

13 February 2010
16:30 UTC±0

East End Lions (Sierra Leone)	2 – 2	(Tunisia) Espérance ST
Issa Kamara 19'; Mohamed Kabia 24'	Report	Khaled Ayari 39'; Skander Cheikh 45'

National Stadium, Freetown
Referee: Papa Bakary Gassama (Gambia)
26 February 2010
16:00 UTC+1

Espérance ST (Tunisia)	3 – 2	(Sierra Leone) East End Lions
Roger Toindouba 4'; Wajdi Bouazzi 34'; Mickael Eneramo 88'	Report	Mohamed Kabia 10'; Dauda Kanu 86'

Stade 7 November, Tunis
Referee: S.P. Samuel Ilboudo (Burkina Faso)

Espérance ST won 5 – 4 on aggregate and advanced to the first round.

14 February 2010

Stade Mandji (Gabon)	0 – 2	(Burkina Faso) ASFA Yennega
	Report	Ocansey Mandela 23', 68'

Stade Pierre Claver Divounguy, Port-Gentil
Referee: Jean-M Moukoko (Congo)
28 February 2010

ASFA Yennega (Burkina Faso)	4 – 1	(Gabon) Stade Mandji
Asante Solomon 25'; Ocansey Mandela 28', 69'; Plange Nii Adamah 45'	Report	Nkoua C. Junior 65'

Stade du 4-Août, Ouagadougou
Referee: Kokou Atsoo (Togo)

ASFA Yennega won 6 – 1 on aggregate and advanced to the first round.

13 February 2010

La Passe (Seychelles)	1 – 0	(Mauritius) Curepipe Starlight
Hassman Abdou 55'	Report

Stade Linité, Victoria
Referee: Bongiseni Fakudze (Swaziland)
28 February 2010

Curepipe Starlight (Mauritius)	3 – 1	(Seychelles) La Passe
Sanhaboa Tomy 45'; Olayeni Fashina 62'; Dawoochano Sewraj 80'	Report	Hassman Abdou 37'

Stade Auguste Vollaire, Centre de Flacq
Referee: J. Rakotonjanahary (Madagascar)

Curepipe Starlight won 3 – 2 on aggregate and advanced to the first round.

13 February 2010
15:30 UTC+2

Gaborone United (Botswana)	0 – 0	(South Africa) Orlando Pirates
	Report

University of Botswana Stadium, Gaborone
Referee: Anthony Raphael (Malawi)
28 February 2010
15:30 UTC+2

Orlando Pirates (South Africa)	2 – 2	(Botswana) Gaborone United
Katlego Mashego 50'; Bennett Chenene 54'	Report	Katlego Mashego 84' (o.g.); Stephen Maposa 85'

Nelson Mandela Bay Stadium, Port Elizabeth
Referee: Dermandra Nunkoo (Mauritius)

Aggregate 2 – 2. Gaborone United advanced on the away goals rule to the first round.

13 February 2010
16:00 UTC+3

Young Africans (Tanzania)	2 – 3	(Democratic Republic of the Congo) Saint Eloi Lupopo
Kigi Makasi 51'; Mrisho Ngassa 69'	Report	Garrington Gonba 4'; Philip Narufu 38'; Ntonbo Ivtete 82'

Benjamin Mkapa National Stadium, Dar es Salaam
Referee: Eric Gasinzigwa (Burundi)
27 February 2010

Saint Eloi Lupopo (Democratic Republic of the Congo)	1 – 0	(Tanzania) Young Africans
Kayembe Mukendi 77'	Report

Stade de la Kenya, Lubumbashi
Referee: Neant Alioum (Cameroon)

Saint Eloi Lupopo won 4 – 2 on aggregate and advanced to the first round.

14 February 2010

Mafunzo (Zanzibar)	1 – 2	(Zimbabwe) Gunners
Makaay Ayoub 90'	Report	David Rediyoni 45'; Norman Maroto 49'

Uhuru Stadium, Dar es Salaam (Tanzania)
Referee: Hussein Mohamed (Sudan)
28 February 2010

Gunners (Zimbabwe)	4 – 0	(Zanzibar) Mafunzo
Norman Maroto 41'; Ramson Zhuwawo 44', 70'; Ali Sadiki 90+2'	Report

Dzivaresekwa Stadium, Harare
Referee: R. Seechurn (Mauritius)

Gunners won 6 – 1 on aggregate and advanced to the first round.

14 February 2010
15:00 UTC+1

Tempête Mocaf (Central African Republic)	1 – 2	(Libya) Ittihad
Igor Mandjao 21'	Report	Daouda Kamilou 71'; Mohamed Esnani 81'

Barthelemy Boganda Stadium, Bangui
Referee: Gil Ndume (Gabon)
27 February 2010
19:30 UTC+2

Ittihad (Libya)	6 – 0	(Central African Republic) Tempête Mocaf
Ali Rahuma 2'; Ahmed Zuway 14', 42'; Marwan Mansour Mabrouk 20'; Pierre Koulibaly 31', 38'	Report

June 11 Stadium, Tripoli
Referee: Ibrahim Chaibou (Niger)

Ittihad won 8 – 1 on aggregate and advanced to the first round.

13 February 2010
16:00 UTC±0

Os Balantas (Guinea-Bissau)	0 – 0	(Morocco) Difaa El Jadida
	Report

Estadio de Mansôa, Mansôa
Referee: Ebenezer S. Kona (Liberia)
27 February 2010
20:00 UTC±0

Difaa El Jadida (Morocco)	3 – 0	(Guinea-Bissau) Os Balantas
Cheick Oumar Dabo 9', 40'; Saïd Makasi 33'	Report

Stade El Abdi, El Jadida
Referee: Joseph O. Lamptey (Ghana)

Difaa El Jadida won 3 – 0 on aggregate and advanced to the first round.

12 February 2010
16:00 UTC+3

URA (Uganda)	1 – 0	(Zambia) Zanaco
Kameesa Manco 90'	Report

Mandela National Stadium, Kampala
Referee: Hudu Munyemana (Rwanda)
27 February 2010

Zanaco (Zambia)	4 – 0	(Uganda) URA
Allan Mukuka 16'; Makundika Sakala 37', 54'; Winston Kalewgo 49'	Report

Sunset Stadium, Lusaka
Referee: Tabani Mnkantjo (Zimbabwe)

Zanaco won 4 – 1 on aggregate and advanced to the first round.

Union Douala (Cameroon)	w/o	São Tomé and Príncipe 1

Union Douala advanced to the first round after the São Tomé and Príncipe representative was withdrawn.

14 February 2010
15:00 UTC+1

Diables Noirs (Republic of the Congo)	3 – 2	(Algeria) ES Sétif
Fabrice N'Guessi 3'; Noelly 11', 13'	Report	Lamouri Djediat 16'; Lazhar Hadj Aïssa 81'

Stade Marchand, Brazzaville
Referee: Adam Cordier (Chad)
27 February 2010
18:00 UTC+1

ES Sétif (Algeria)	2 – 0	(Republic of the Congo) Diables Noirs
Mourad Delhoum 25', 40'	Report

Stade 8 Mai 1945, Sétif
Referee: Denis Dembele (Ivory Coast)

ES Sétif won 4 – 3 on aggregate and advanced to the first round.

13 February 2010

Vital'O (Burundi)	2 – 2	(Cameroon) Tiko United
Leopold Nkurikiye 12' (pen.), 79'	Report	Edingue Tombe 36'; Njounkou Job 40'

Prince Louis Rwagasore Stadium, Bujumbura
Referee: Mohamed Ali Farah (Djibouti)
27 February 2010
15:30 UTC+1

Tiko United (Cameroon)	2 – 2	(Burundi) Vital'O
Njounkou Job 6'; Francis Evambe 75'	Report	Amissi Tambwe 56'; Matembe Type 59'
Penalties
	5 – 3

Stade Moliko, Tiko
Referee: Mbila Leya (Congo DR)

Aggregate 4 – 4. Tiko United won the penalty shootout and advanced to the first round.

14 February 2010
15:30 UTC+2

Mbabane Swallows (Eswatini)	1 – 3	(South Africa) Supersport United
Lwazi Maziya 84'	Report	Tebogo Langerman 7'; Thabo Mongalo 20'; Dario Monteiro 67'

Somhlolo National Stadium, Lobamba
Referee: Paul M. Phomane (Lesotho)
27 February 2010
20:15 UTC+2

Supersport United (South Africa)	2 – 2	(Eswatini) Mbabane Swallows
Brian Umony 35'; Brent Carelse 64'	Report	Bougania Cisse 61'; Ndzimandze Mfanfikile 69'

Super Stadium, Atteridgeville
Referee: Alex Tiyeho (Namibia)

Supersport United won 5 – 3 and advanced to the first round.

12 February 2010
15:00 UTC+3

Apache Club de Mitsamiouli (Comoros)	3 – 5	(Mozambique) Ferroviário Maputo
Adinane Moumine 48', 53'; Ahmed Radjab 84'	Report	Italo Fernandes 6'; Jerry Sitoe 45'; Jorge Manjate 60'; Carlos Parruaue 75'; Michael Nymukasa 87'

Mahamasina Municipal Stadium, Antananarivo (Madagascar)
Referee: Russom A. Eyob (Eritrea)
27 February 2010

Ferroviário Maputo (Mozambique)	4 – 1	(Comoros) Apache Club de Mitsamiouli
Adnan Gürbüz 7'; Jerry Sitoe 51', 81'; Carlos Parruaue 62'	Report	Ahmed Radjab 87'

Estádio da Machava, Maputo
Referee: P. Simao Dos Santos (Angola)

Ferroviário Maputo won 9 – 4 on aggregate and advanced to the first round.

== First round ==
This is a knock-out stage of 32 teams; the 26 teams advancing from the preliminary round, and 6 teams that received byes to this round.

First legs: 19–21 March 2010; Second legs: 2–5 April 2010.

20 March 2010
15:30 UTC+2

APR (Rwanda)	1 – 0	(Democratic Republic of the Congo) TP Mazembe
Albeir Ngabo 87'	Report

Stade Amahoro, Kigali
Referee: Daniel Bennett (South Africa)
4 April 2010
15:30 UTC+2

TP Mazembe (Democratic Republic of the Congo)	2 – 0	(Rwanda) APR
Trésor Mputu 7'; Kabangu Mulota 72'	Report

Stade de la Kenya, Lubumbashi
Referee: Wellington Kaoma (Zambia)

TP Mazembe won 2 – 1 on aggregate and advanced to the second round.

21 March 2010
16:30 UTC±0

Djoliba (Mali)	1 – 0	(Senegal) ASC Linguère
Koffi Pascal Nguessan 25'	Report

Complex Sportif Hérémakono, Bamako
Referee: Aboubacar Bangoura (Guinea)
5 April 2010
17:00 UTC±0

ASC Linguère (Senegal)	1 – 0	(Mali) Djoliba
Mbaye Thiam 39'	Report
Penalties
	3 – 4

Stade de Linguère, Saint-Louis
Referee: Noumandiez Doue (Ivory Coast)

Aggregate 1 – 1. Djoliba won the penalty shootout and advanced to the second round.

20 March 2010
19:30 UTC+2

Ismaily (Egypt)	3 – 1	(Réunion) US Stade Tamponnaise
Ahmed Samir Farag 16', 80'; Mohamed Mohsen Abougrisha 70'	Report	Mohamed Modghary 33'

Ismailia Stadium, Ismailia
Referee: Abdellah El Achiri (Morocco)
3 April 2010
20:00 UTC+4

US Stade Tamponnaise (Réunion)	1 – 0	(Egypt) Ismaily
Mamoudou Diallo 31'	Report

Stade Klébert Picard, Le Tampon
Referee: Sylvester Kirwa (Kenya)

Ismaily won 3 – 2 on aggregate and advanced to the second round.

21 March 2010
15:30 UTC±0

Africa Sports (Ivory Coast)	0 – 0	(Sudan) Al-Hilal Omdurman
	Report

Abidjan
Referee: Malang Diedhiou (Senegal)
4 April 2010
20:00 UTC+3

Al-Hilal Omdurman (Sudan)	4 – 1	(Ivory Coast) Africa Sports
Massawi 29', 50'; Lelo Mbele 72', 90+3'	Report	Djedjed Landry 90+2'

AlHilal Stadium, Omdurman
Referee: Amanuel Eyob Russom (Eritrea)

Al-Hilal Omdurman won 4 – 1 on aggregate and advanced to the second round.

21 March 2010
17:00 UTC±0

Raja Casablanca (Morocco)	1 – 1	(Angola) Petro de Luanda
Mohsine Moutouali 48' (pen.)		Avex 43'

Stade Mohamed V, Casablanca
Referee: Mohamed Benouza (Algeria)
4 April 2010
16:00 UTC+1

Petro de Luanda (Angola)	1 – 0	(Morocco) Raja Casablanca
Joka 65'

Estádio 11 de Novembro, Luanda
Referee: Kalyoto Robert Ngosi (Malawi)

Petro de Luanda won 2 – 1 on aggregate and advanced to the second round.

19 March 2010
17:00 UTC+1

Club Africain (Tunisia)	1 – 1	(Algeria) JS Kabylie
Mohamed Traore 85'	Report	Idriss Ech-Chergui 30'

Stade El Menzah, Tunis
Referee: Khalid Ennouni (Morocco)
2 April 2010
16:00 UTC+1

JS Kabylie (Algeria)	1 – 0	(Tunisia) Club Africain
Sid Ali Yahia-Chérif 36'	Report

Stade 1er Novembre, Tizi Ouzou
Referee: Adel El Raay (Libya)

JS Kabylie won 2 – 1 on aggregate and advanced to the second round.

21 March 2010
16:00 UTC+1

Gazelle FC (Chad)	1 – 1	(Sudan) Al-Merreikh
Tarig Mokhtar 80' (o.g.)	Report	Kelechi Osunwa 70'

Stade Nacional, N'Djamena
Referee: Jean Michel Moukoko (Congo)
3 April 2010
20:00 UTC+3

Al-Merreikh (Sudan)	2 – 0	(Chad) Gazelle FC
Kelechi Osunwa 10'; Silvaia 61' (o.g.)	Report

Al Merreikh Stadium, Omdurman
Referee: Onesime Ndayisenga (Burundi)

Al-Merreikh won 3 – 1 on aggregate and advanced to the second round.

20 March 2010
17:00 UTC+1

Espérance ST (Tunisia)	4 – 1	(Burkina Faso) ASFA Yennega
Khaled Ayari 13'; Michael Eneramo 20'; Wajdi Bouazzi 26'; Zied Derbali 55'	Report	Syam Ben Youssef 41' (o.g.)

Stade 7 November, Tunis
Referee: Mokhtar Amalou (Algeria)
3 April 2010
16:00 UTC±0

ASFA Yennega (Burkina Faso)	1 – 3	(Tunisia) Espérance ST
Ocansey Mandela 19'	Report	Michael Eneramo 2'; Khaled Ayari 19'; Wajdi Bouazzi 80'

Stade du 4-Août, Ouagadougou
Referee: Yakhouba Keita (Guinea)

Espérance ST won 7 –2 on aggregate and advanced to the second round.

20 March 2010
16:15 UTC+4

Curepipe Starlight (Mauritius)	0 – 3	(Botswana) Gaborone United
	Report	Vincent Puri 6'; Ronald Chikoma 45'; Mandlo Mgada 52'

Stade George V, Curepipe
Referee: Saindou Ibrahim (Comoros)
2 April 2010
15:30 UTC+2

Gaborone United (Botswana)	3 – 0	(Mauritius) Curepipe Starlight
Pierre France 30' (o.g.); Mandla Mgadla 49'; Otlaadisa Mohambi 86'	Report

University of Botswana Stadium, Gaborone
Referee: Paul Phomane (Lesotho)

Gaborone United won 6 – 0 on aggregate and advanced to the second round.

21 March 2010
16:30 UTC+2

Saint Eloi Lupopo (Democratic Republic of the Congo)	0 – 1	(Zimbabwe) Dynamos
	Report	Cuthbert Malajila 73'

Stade de la Kenya, Lubumbashi
Referee: Khalid Abdel Rahman (Sudan)
4 April 2010
15:00 UTC+2

Dynamos (Zimbabwe)	1 – 0	(Democratic Republic of the Congo) Saint Eloi Lupopo
Kamusoko 69'	Report

National Sports Stadium, Harare
Referee: Helder Martins de Carvalho (Angola)

Dynamos won 2 – 0 on aggregate and advanced to the second round.

20 March 2010
16:00 UTC+2

Gunners (Zimbabwe)	1 – 0	(Egypt) Al-Ahly
Norman Maroto 23'	Report

Rufaro Stadium, Harare
Referee: Eddy Maillet (Seychelles)
2 April 2010
19:30 UTC+2

Al-Ahly (Egypt)	2 – 0	(Zimbabwe) Gunners
Ahmed Shoukry 21'; Mohamed Samir 45'	Report

Cairo Stadium, Cairo
Referee: Rédouane Jiyed (Morocco)

Al-Ahly won 2 – 1 on aggregate and advanced to the second round.

19 March 2010
18:30 UTC+2

Ittihad (Libya)	1 – 1	(Morocco) Difaa El Jadida
Ahmed Zuway 58'	Report	Cheick Oumar Dabo 74'

June 11 Stadium, Tripoli
Referee: Kokou Djaoupe (Togo)
2 April 2010
19:00 UTC±0

Difaa El Jadida (Morocco)	1 – 1	(Libya) Ittihad
Cheick Oumar Dabo 67'	Report	Daouda Kamilou 73'
Penalties
	3 – 4

Stade El Abdi, El Jadida
Referee: Slim Jedidi (Tunisia)

Aggregate 2 – 2. Ittihad won the penalty shootout and advanced to the second round.

20 March 2010
15:00 UTC+2

Zanaco (Zambia)	1 – 0	(Ivory Coast) ASEC Mimosas
Makundika Sakala 75'	Report

Nkoloma Stadium, Lusaka
Referee: Rajindraparsad Seechurn (Mauritius)
4 April 2010
15:30 UTC±0

ASEC Mimosas (Ivory Coast)	1 – 1	(Zambia) Zanaco
Mangoua Kesse 44'	Report	Trinity Chalanshi 53'

Stade Félix Houphouët-Boigny, Abidjan
Referee: Joseph Lamptey (Ghana)

Zanaco won 2 – 1 on aggregate and advanced to the second round.

21 March 2010
14:30 UTC+1

Union Douala (Cameroon)	0 – 2	(Algeria) ES Sétif
	Report	Lazhar Hadj Aïssa 19'; Lamouri Djediat 39'

Stade de la Réunification, Douala
Referee: Hudu Munyemana (Rwanda)
2 April 2010
19:00 UTC+1

ES Sétif (Algeria)	5 – 0	(Cameroon) Union Douala
Lazhar Hadj Aïssa 15'; Lamouri Djediat 40'; Mehdi Kacem 63'; Smaïl Diss 72'; Mohamed Seghir Ferradji 84'	Report

Stade 8 Mai 1945, Sétif
Referee: Koman Coulibaly (Mali)

ES Sétif won 7 – 0 on aggregate and advanced to the second round.

20 March 2010
15:30 UTC+1

Tiko United (Cameroon)	2 – 2	(Nigeria) Heartland
Ackey Ambino 60'; Tamen Nghanthy 85'	Report	Signs Chibambo 76', 90'

Stade de la Réunification, Douala
Referee: Ousmane Karembe (Mali)
4 April 2010
16:00 UTC+1

Heartland (Nigeria)	1 – 1	(Cameroon) Tiko United
Emmanuel Omodiagbe 85'	Report	Njondong Joel 30'

Dan Anyiam Stadium, Owerri
Referee: Monetchet Leonard Nahi (Ivory Coast)

Aggregate 3 – 3. Heartland advanced on the away goals rule to the second round.

20 March 2010
20:15 UTC+2

Supersport United (South Africa)	3 – 0	(Mozambique) Ferroviário Maputo
Tebogo Langerman 37', 61'; Anthony Laffor 44'	Report

Rand Stadium, Johannesburg
Referee: Mal Mohamadou (Cameroon)
3 April 2010
15:00 UTC+2

Ferroviário Maputo (Mozambique)	2 – 0	(South Africa) Supersport United
Jerry Sitoe 12'; Momed Hagy 26'	Report

Estádio da Machava, Maputo
Referee: Odan Charles Mbaga (Tanzania)

Supersport United won 3 – 2 on aggregate and advanced to the second round.

== Second round ==
This is a knock-out stage of the 16 teams that advanced from the first round; winners will advance to the group stage, with the losers advancing to the CAF Confederation Cup.

First legs: 23–25 April 2010; Second legs 7–9 May 2010.

25 April 2010
17:00 UTC±0

Djoliba (Mali)	0 – 1	(Democratic Republic of the Congo) TP Mazembe
	Report	Trésor Mputu 53' (pen.)

Complex Sportif Hérémakono, Bamako
Referee: Mohamed Benouza (Algeria)
9 May 2010
16:30 UTC+2

TP Mazembe (Democratic Republic of the Congo)	3 – 0	(Mali) Djoliba
Dioko Kaluyituka 27' (pen.), 60'; Trésor Mputu 28'	Report

Stade de la Kenya, Lubumbashi
Referee: Kokou Djaoupe (Togo)

TP Mazembe won 4 – 0 on aggregate and advanced to the group stage.

25 April 2010
20:00 UTC+3

Al-Hilal Omdurman (Sudan)	0 – 1	(Egypt) Ismaily
	Report	Homos 45'

AlHilal Stadium, Omdurman
Referee: Jerome Damon (South Africa)
9 May 2010
18:00 UTC+2

Ismaily (Egypt)	3 – 1	(Sudan) Al-Hilal Omdurman
Homos 65'; Ahmed Samir Farag 76'; Ahmed Khairy 90'	Report	Edward Sadomba 27'

Ismailia Stadium, Ismailia
Referee: Rajindraparsad Seechurn (Mauritius)

Ismaily won 4 – 1 on aggregate and advanced to the group stage.

25 April 2010
17:00 UTC+1

JS Kabylie (Algeria)	2 – 0	(Angola) Petro de Luanda
Farès Hamiti 51'; Mohamed Amine Aoudia 90'

Stade 1er Novembre, Tizi Ouzou
Referee: Eddy Maillet (Seychelles)
9 May 2010
16:00 UTC+1

Petro de Luanda (Angola)	2 – 1	(Algeria) JS Kabylie
Magalhaes 5'; Job 13'		Mohamed Amine Aoudia 54'

Estádio 11 de Novembro, Luanda
Referee: Daniel Bennett (South Africa)

JS Kabylie won 3 – 2 on aggregate and advanced to the group stage.

23 April 2010
16:00 UTC+1

Espérance ST (Tunisia)	3 – 0	(Sudan) Al-Merreikh
Michael Eneramo 8'; Aymen Ben Omar 23'; Oussama Darragi 28' (pen.)	Report

Stade 7 November, Tunis
Referee: Khalil Rouassi (Morocco)
8 May 2010
20:00 UTC+3

Al-Merreikh (Sudan)	1 – 1	(Tunisia) Espérance ST
Janvier-Besala Bokungu 45' (o.g.)	Report	Wajdi Bouazzi 52'

Al Merreikh Stadium, Omdurman
Referee: Adel El Raay (Libya)

Espérance ST won 4 – 1 on aggregate and advanced to the group stage.

25 April 2010
16:00 UTC+2

Dynamos (Zimbabwe)	4 – 1	(Botswana) Gaborone United
Dylan Chivandire 42'; Benjamin Marere 44'; Farai Vimisayi 56'; Evans Gwekwerere 83'	Report	Mandla Mgadla 29'

National Sports Stadium, Harare
Referee: Muhmed Ssegonga (Uganda)
8 May 2010
15:30 UTC+2

Gaborone United (Botswana)	1 – 0	(Zimbabwe) Dynamos
Ofentse Nato 84'	Report

University of Botswana Stadium, Gaborone
Referee: Amanuel Eyob Russom (Eritrea)

Dynamos won 4 – 2 on aggregate and advanced to the group stage.

23 April 2010
20:30 UTC+2

Ittihad (Libya)	2 – 0	(Egypt) Al-Ahly
Younes Shibani 13'; Ahmed Zuway 73'	Report

June 11 Stadium, Tripoli
Referee: Koman Coulibaly (Mali)
9 May 2010
20:00 UTC+3

Al-Ahly (Egypt)	3 – 0	(Libya) Ittihad
Emad Moteab 60'; Mohamed Fadl 74'; Shehab El-Din Ahmed 90+4'	Report

Cairo Stadium, Cairo
Referee: Noumandiez Doué (Ivory Coast)

Al-Ahly won 3 – 2 on aggregate and advanced to the group stage.

24 April 2010
19:00 UTC+1

ES Sétif (Algeria)	1 – 0	(Zambia) Zanaco
Mourad Delhoum 73'	Report

Stade 8 Mai 1945, Sétif
Referee: Badara Diatta (Senegal)
8 May 2010
15:00 UTC+2

Zanaco (Zambia)	2 – 2	(Algeria) ES Sétif
Makundika Sakala 53'; Kennedy Nketani 78'	Report	Nabil Hemani 61'; Lazhar Hadj Aïssa 77'

Nkoloma Stadium, Lusaka
Referee: Khalid Abdel Rahman (Sudan)

ES Sétif won 3 – 2 on aggregate and advanced to the group stage.

24 April 2010
20:15 UTC+2

Supersport United (South Africa)	1 – 1	(Nigeria) Heartland
Thabo September 39'	Report	Thankgod Ike 3'

Rand Stadium, Johannesburg
Referee: Joseph Lamptey (Ghana)
9 May 2010
15:00 UTC+1

Heartland (Nigeria)	3 – 1	(South Africa) Supersport United
Emeka Nwanna 39'; John Owoeri 70'; Bello Musa Kofarmata 75'	Report	Brian Umony 80'

Dan Anyiam Stadium, Owerri
Referee: Djamel Haimoudi (Algeria)

Heartland won 4 – 2 on aggregate and advanced to the group stage.
