= 2010 CAF Champions League final =

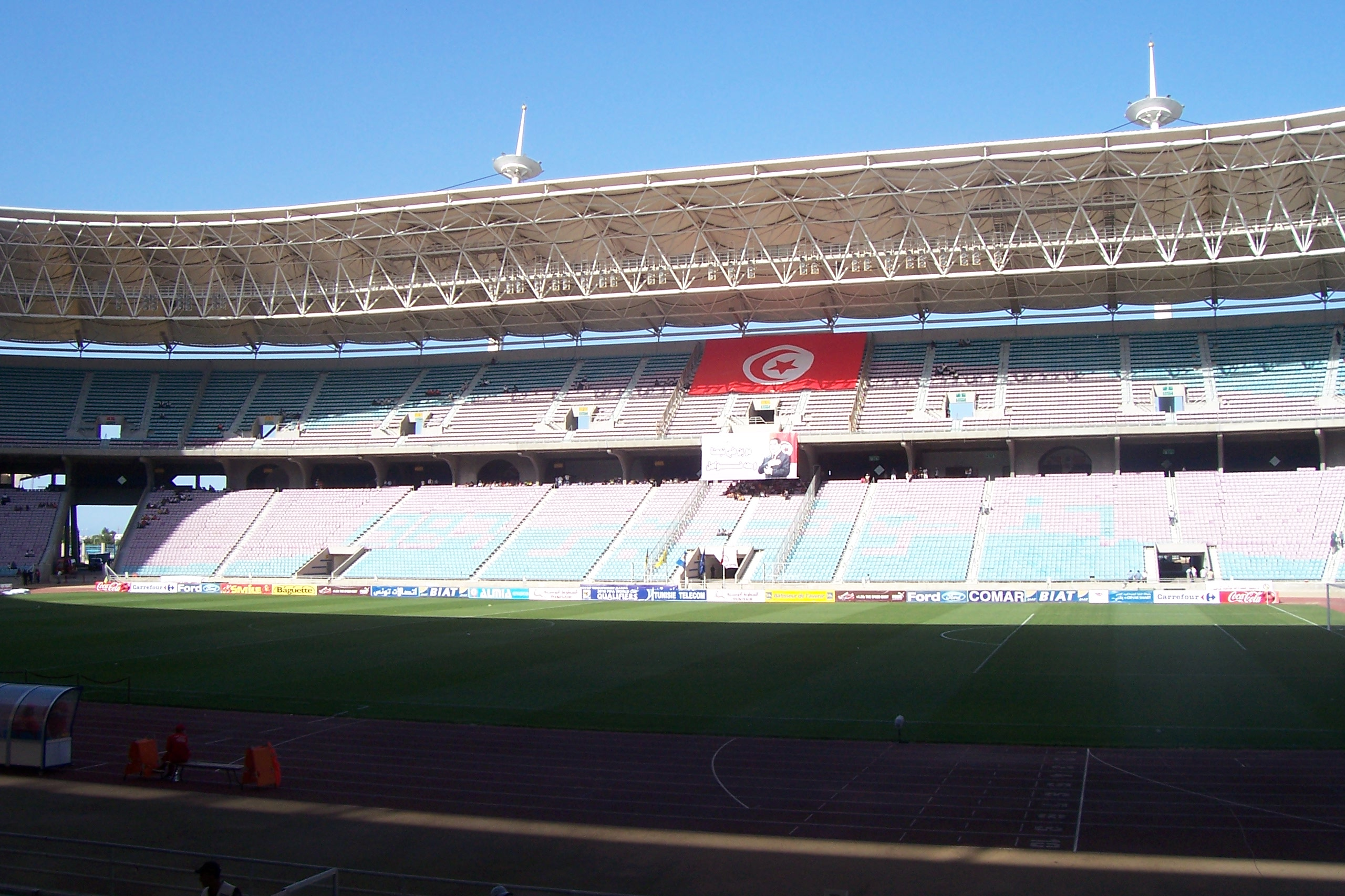
- 7 November Stadium hosted the podium where TP Mazembe lifted the trophy
- Event: 2010 CAF Champions League
TP Mazembe	Espérance de Tunis
(Democratic Republic of the Congo)	(Tunisia)
6	1

First leg
TP Mazembe	Espérance de Tunis
5	0
- Date: 31 October 2010
- Venue: Stade de la Kenya, Lubumbashi
- Referee: Kokou Djaoupe (Togo)
- Attendance: 30,000
- Weather: Sunny

Second Leg
Espérance de Tunis	TP Mazembe
1	1
- Date: 13 November 2010
- Venue: Stade 7 November, Tunis
- Referee: Daniel Bennett (South Africa)
- Attendance: 60,000
- Weather: Partly Cloudy

The 2010 CAF Champions League final was the final of 2010 CAF Champions League. TP Mazembe of the Democratic Republic of the Congo beat Espérance ST from Tunisia 6–1 on aggregate to win their fourth title in the competition, and their second in a row. They also qualified to the quarter-finals for the 2010 FIFA Club World Cup.

== Qualified teams ==
In the following table, finals until 1996 were in the African Cup of Champions Club era, since 1997 were in the CAF Champions League era.

Team	Region	Previous finals appearances (bold indicates winners)
(Democratic Republic of the Congo) TP Mazembe	UNIFFAC (Central Africa)	**1967**, **1968**, 1969, 1970, **2009**
(Tunisia) Espérance de Tunis	UNAF (North Africa)	**1994**, 1999, 2000

== Background ==
TP Mazembe won the title in 2009, which was their third title overall after winning it 1967 and 1968 when it was called the African Cup of Champions Clubs. Espérance entered the Champions league for the first time since 2005. In 1994 they won their only title so far. Both teams met in the Group stage, with each victorious in their home matches - Mazembe winning 2–1, while Espérance won 3–0. Both teams qualified for the semifinals on the second-last matchday. In the semifinals Mazembe defeated the Algerian side (and Group Stage winner) JS Kabylie 3–1 on aggregate, winning the first leg at home by that score, with the second leg ending in a scoreless draw. Espérance faced Al-Ahly from Egypt and lost the first leg 2–1 away from home. In need of a win in the second leg, Espérance were victorious 1–0 and reached the final on the away goals rule.

== Venues ==
=== Frédéric-Kibassa-Maliba Stadium ===
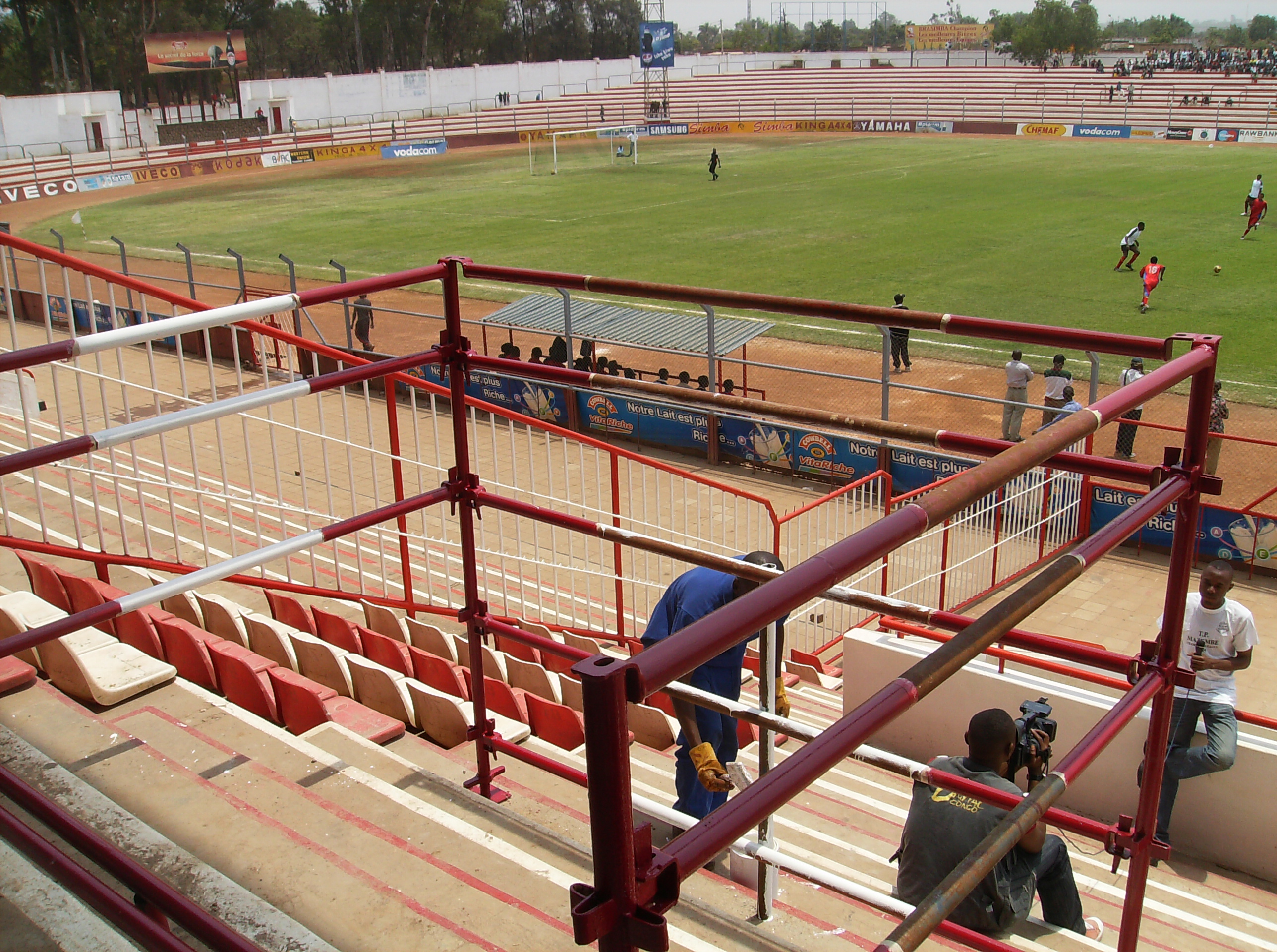
Stade de la Kenya in Lubumbashi, DR Congo hosted the first leg.

Stade Frédéric-Kibassa-Maliba, also known as Stade de la Kenya, is a multi-use stadium located in the Kenya suburb of Lubumbashi, Democratic Republic of the Congo. It is currently used mostly for football matches. It is the current home of FC Saint Eloi Lupopo and the former home venue of TP Mazembe. The stadium has a capacity of 35,000 people and is named after Frederic Kibassa Maliba, a former Minister of Youth and Sports.

=== 7 November Stadium ===
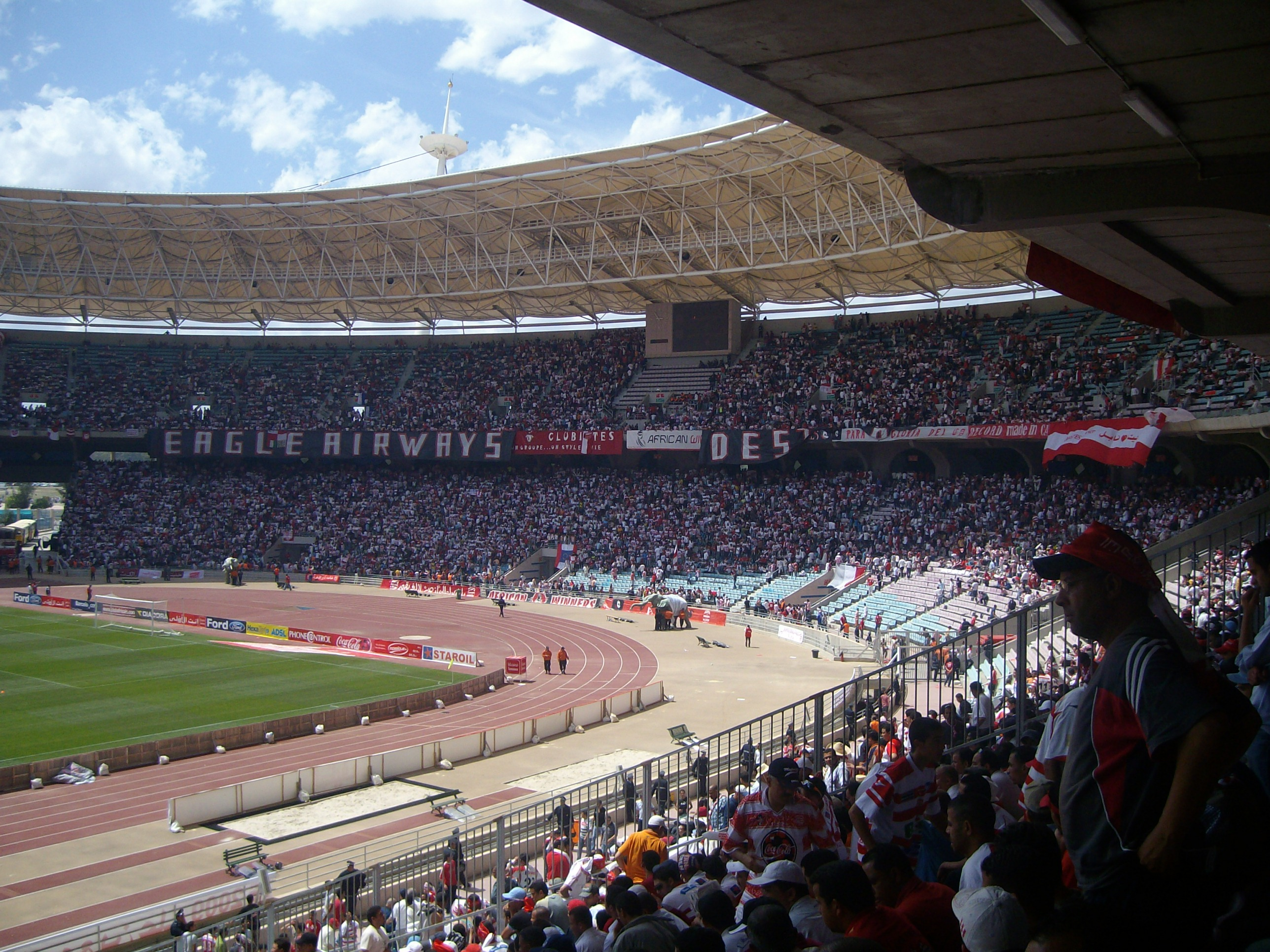
7 November Stadium in Radès, Tunisia hosted the second leg.

7 November Stadium is a multi-purpose stadium in Radès, Tunis, Tunisia about 10 kilometers south-east of the city center of Tunis, in the center of the Olympic City. It is currently used mostly for football matches and it also has facilities for athletics. The stadium holds 60,000 and was built in 2001 for the 2001 Mediterranean Games and is considered to be one of the best stadiums in Africa. The stadium was built for the 2001 Mediterranean Games, the 60,000-seat covered area covers 13,000 m2 and consists of a central area, 3 adjoining grounds, 2 warm-up rooms, 2 paintings and an official stand of 7,000 seats. The press gallery is equipped with 300 desks.

Club Africain and ES Tunis play their major league matches here. Before the construction of this stadium, the Tunis derby used to be played in the 45,000 seat-capacity Stade El Menzah. It is also the stadium of Tunisia national football team since 2001.

This stadium has hosted matches of the 2004 African Cup of Nations which was won by the Tunisian team.

== Road to the final ==
TP Mazembe			Round	Espérance ST		
Opponent	Result	Legs	Qualification stage	Opponent	Result	Legs
(Rwanda) APR	2–1	0–1 away, 2–0 home	First round	(Burkina Faso) ASFA Yennega	7–2	4–1 home, 3–1 away
(Mali) Djoliba	4–0	1–0 away, 3–0 home	Second round	(Sudan) Al-Merreikh	4–1	3–0 home, 1–1 away
Main article: 2010 CAF Champions League group stage: Group A: Pos / Team / Pld / W / D / L / GF / GA / GD / Pts / Qualification; 1 / (Tunisia) Espérance ST / 6 / 4 / 1 / 1 / 9 / 4 / +5 / **13** / **Advance to knockout stage**; **2** / (Democratic Republic of the Congo) TP Mazembe / **6** / **3** / **2** / **1** / **8** / **7** / **+1** / **11** / **Advance to knockout stage**; 3 / (Algeria) ES Sétif / 6 / 1 / 3 / 2 / 7 / 6 / +1 / **6**; 4 / (Zimbabwe) Dynamos / 6 / 1 / 0 / 5 / 2 / 9 / −7 / **3**; Source:			Group stage	Main article: 2010 CAF Champions League group stage: Group A: Pos / Team / Pld / W / D / L / GF / GA / GD / Pts / Qualification; **1** / (Tunisia) Espérance ST / **6** / **4** / **1** / **1** / **9** / **4** / **+5** / **13** / **Advance to knockout stage**; 2 / (Democratic Republic of the Congo) TP Mazembe / 6 / 3 / 2 / 1 / 8 / 7 / +1 / **11** / **Advance to knockout stage**; 3 / (Algeria) ES Sétif / 6 / 1 / 3 / 2 / 7 / 6 / +1 / **6**; 4 / (Zimbabwe) Dynamos / 6 / 1 / 0 / 5 / 2 / 9 / −7 / **3**; Source:		
Opponent	Result	Legs	Knockout stage	Opponent	Result	Legs
(Algeria) JS Kabylie	3–1	3–1 home, 0–0 away	Semifinals	(Egypt) Al-Ahly	2–2	1–2 away, 1–0 home

== Format ==
The final was decided over two legs, with aggregate goals used to determine the winner. If the sides were level on aggregate after the second leg, the away goals rule would have been applied, and if still level, the tie would have proceeded directly to a penalty shootout (no extra time is played).

== Matches ==
=== First leg ===
31 October 2010
15:30 UTC+2

TP Mazembe (Democratic Republic of the Congo)	5 – 0	(Tunisia) Espérance ST
Ngandu 19', 75'; Kaluyituka 45' (pen.); Singuluma 55', 59'	Report

Stade de la Kenya, Lubumbashi
Attendance: 30,000
Referee: Kokou Djaoupe (Togo)

**Mazembe**	**Espérance**

Mazembe:
GK	1	(Democratic Republic of the Congo) Muteba Kidiaba
RB	3	(Democratic Republic of the Congo) Kiritsho Kasusula
CB	4	(Democratic Republic of the Congo) Miala Nkulukutu
CB	16	(Zambia) Stopila Sunzu
LB	2	(Democratic Republic of the Congo) Joël Kimwaki
RM	20	(Democratic Republic of the Congo) Mihayo Kazembe
CM	27	(Democratic Republic of the Congo) Kasongo Ngandu	(substituted off) 75'
CM	13	(Democratic Republic of the Congo) Bedi Mbenza
LM	15	(Democratic Republic of the Congo) Dioko Kaluyituka
CF	11	(Democratic Republic of the Congo) Patou Kabangu	(substituted off) 75'
CF	10	(Zambia) Given Singuluma
Substitutes:
MF	25	(Zimbabwe) Christopher Semakweri	(substituted on) 75'
FW	6	(Democratic Republic of the Congo) Déo Kanda A Mukok	(substituted on) 75'
Manager:
(Senegal) Lamine N'Diaye

Espérance:
GK	22	(Tunisia) Wassim Naouara
RB	24	(Ghana) Harrison Afful
CB	19	(Tunisia) Walid Hichri
CB	12	(Tunisia) Khalil Chemmam
LB	20	(Tunisia) Mohamed Ben Mansour	(red card) 24'
RM	21	(Tunisia) Mejdi Traoui
CM	9	(Tunisia) Saber Khalifa
CM	23	(Tunisia) Khaled Korbi
LM	14	(Nigeria) Michael Eneramo		(substituted off) 66'
CF	10	(Tunisia) Oussama Darragi		(substituted off) 35'
CF	28	(Tunisia) Youssef Msakni (c)		(substituted off) 88'
Substitutes:
DF	27	(Tunisia) Zied Derbali		(substituted on) 35'
FW	7	(Tunisia) Khaled Ayari		(substituted on) 66'
MF	13	(Cameroon) Roger Toindouba		(substituted on) 88'
Manager:
(Tunisia) Faouzi Benzarti

Assistant referees:

Biagui Djoukere (Togo)
Mathias Ayena (Togo)
Fourth official:
Kokou Atsoo (Togo)

=== Second leg ===
13 November 2010
18:00 UTC+1

Espérance ST (Tunisia)	1 – 1	(Democratic Republic of the Congo) TP Mazembe
Afful 24'	Report	Kanda A Mukok 67'

Stade 7 November, Tunis
Attendance: 60,000
Referee: Daniel Bennett (South Africa)

**Espérance**	**Mazembe**

Espérance:
GK	1	(Tunisia) Moez Ben Cherifia
RB	24	(Ghana) Harrison Afful	(yellow card) 62'
CB	29	(Tunisia) Walid Hichri
CB	15	(Tunisia) Aymen Ben Amor	(red card) 24'
LB	12	(Tunisia) Khalil Chemmam		(substituted off) 78'
DM	5	(Tunisia) Syam Ben Youssef
CM	9	(Tunisia) Saber Khalifa		(substituted off) 56'
CM	23	(Tunisia) Khaled Korbi	(yellow card) 70'
LM	14	(Nigeria) Michael Eneramo
CF	10	(Tunisia) Oussama Darragi (c)
CF	11	(Cameroon) Roger Toindouba		(substituted off) 50'
Substitutes:
DF	27	(Tunisia) Zied Derbali		(substituted on) 78'
MF	28	(Tunisia) Youssef Msakni		(substituted on) 50'
FW	7	(Tunisia) Khaled Ayari		(substituted on) 56'
Manager:
(Tunisia) Faouzi Benzarti

Mazembe:
GK	1	(Democratic Republic of the Congo) Muteba Kidiaba
RB	3	(Democratic Republic of the Congo) Kiritsho Kasusula
CB	4	(Democratic Republic of the Congo) Miala Nkulukutu		(substituted off) 29'
CB	16	(Zambia) Stopila Sunzu
LB	2	(Democratic Republic of the Congo) Joël Kimwaki
RM	20	(Democratic Republic of the Congo) Mihayo Kazembe	(yellow card) 65'
CM	27	(Democratic Republic of the Congo) Kasongo Ngandu
CM	13	(Democratic Republic of the Congo) Bedi Mbenza
LM	15	(Democratic Republic of the Congo) Dioko Kaluyituka
CF	11	(Democratic Republic of the Congo) Patou Kabangu		(substituted off) 69'
CF	10	(Zambia) Given Singuluma	(yellow card) 44'	(substituted off) 46'
Substitutes:
DF	12	(Democratic Republic of the Congo) Bawaka Mabele		(substituted on) 29'
FW	6	(Democratic Republic of the Congo) Déo Kanda A Mukok		(substituted on) 46'
FW	18	(Democratic Republic of the Congo) Luyeye Mvete		(substituted on) 69'
Manager:
(Senegal) Lamine N'Diaye

Assistant referees:

Siwela Zakhele (South Africa)
Somi Luyanda (South Africa)
Fourth official:
Ebrahim Abdul Basit (South Africa)
