= 2010 CAF Champions League group stage =

- Dates: 16 July – 19 September 2010

Tournament statistics
- Matches played: 24
- Goals scored: 52 (2.17 per match)

The 2010 CAF Champions League group stage matches took place between 16 July and 19 September 2010. The draw for the two groups took place on 13 May 2010, at the CAF Headquarters in Cairo.

The group stage featured 8 qualifiers from the second round of qualifying.

At the completion of the group stage, the top two teams in each group advanced to the semifinals.

== Seeding ==
The seeding for the group stage was announced on 12 May. Each group consists of a team from each of the 4 pots.

| Pot 1 | Pot 2 | Pot 3 | Pot 4 |
|---|---|---|---|
| (Egypt) Al-Ahly (Democratic Republic of the Congo) TP Mazembe^{TH} | (Nigeria) Heartland (Algeria) ES Sétif | (Algeria) JS Kabylie (Zimbabwe) Dynamos | (Tunisia) Espérance ST (Egypt) Ismaily |

^{^TH} Title Holder

== Groups ==
Key to colours in group tables
Group winners and runners-up advanced to the semifinals

=== Group A ===
| Pos | Team | Pld | W | D | L | GF | GA | GD | Pts | Qualification |
|---|---|---|---|---|---|---|---|---|---|---|
| 1 | (Tunisia) Espérance ST | 6 | 4 | 1 | 1 | 9 | 4 | +5 | 13 | Advance to knockout stage |
| 2 | (Democratic Republic of the Congo) TP Mazembe | 6 | 3 | 2 | 1 | 8 | 7 | +1 | 11 | Advance to knockout stage |
| 3 | (Algeria) ES Sétif | 6 | 1 | 3 | 2 | 7 | 6 | +1 | 6 | |
| 4 | (Zimbabwe) Dynamos | 6 | 1 | 0 | 5 | 2 | 9 | −7 | 3 | |

16 July 2010
20:30 UTC+1

| ES Sétif (Algeria) | 0 – 1 | (Tunisia) Espérance ST |
|---|---|---|
| | Report | Bouazzi 53' |

Stade 8 Mai 1945, Sétif
Referee: Daniel Bennett (South Africa)
18 July 2010
15:00 UTC+2

| Dynamos (Zimbabwe) | 0 – 2 | (Democratic Republic of the Congo) TP Mazembe |
|---|---|---|
| | Report | Singuluma 15', 32' |

National Sports Stadium, Harare
Referee: Joseph Lamptey (Ghana)

31 July 2010
20:30 UTC+1

| Espérance ST (Tunisia) | 1 – 0 | (Zimbabwe) Dynamos |
|---|---|---|
| O. Darragi 83' (pen.) | Report |

Stade 7 November, Tunis
Referee: Kokou Djaoupe (Togo)
1 August 2010
15:30 UTC+2

| TP Mazembe (Democratic Republic of the Congo) | 2 – 2 | (Algeria) ES Sétif |
|---|---|---|
| Mbenza 18'; Mputu 57' (pen.) | Report | Hemani 39', 50' |

Stade de la Kenya, Lubumbashi
Referee: Helder Martins de Carvalho (Angola)

15 August 2010
15:00 UTC+2

| Dynamos (Zimbabwe) | 1 – 0 | (Algeria) ES Sétif |
|---|---|---|
| Sithole 31' | Report |

National Sports Stadium, Harare
Referee: Eddy Maillet (Seychelles)
15 August 2010
15:30 UTC+2

| TP Mazembe (Democratic Republic of the Congo) | 2 – 1 | (Tunisia) Espérance ST |
|---|---|---|
| Kaluyituka 44'; Kasongo 86' | Report | M. Eneramo 42' |

Stade de la Kenya, Lubumbashi
Referee: Rajindraparsad Seechurn (Mauritius)

27 August 2010
22:00 UTC+1

| ES Sétif (Algeria) | 3 – 0 | (Zimbabwe) Dynamos |
|---|---|---|
| Feham 32', 75'; Ghazali 77' | Report |

Stade 8 Mai 1945, Sétif
Referee: Abdellah El Achiri (Morocco)
28 August 2010
22:00 UTC+1

| Espérance ST (Tunisia) | 3 – 0 | (Democratic Republic of the Congo) TP Mazembe |
|---|---|---|
| M. Eneramo 20', 50'; W. Hichri 87' | Report |

Stade 7 November, Tunis
Referee: Eddy Maillet (Seychelles)

11 September 2010
20:30 UTC+1

| Espérance ST (Tunisia) | 2 – 2 | (Algeria) ES Sétif |
|---|---|---|
| O. Darragi 42'; Traouri 59' | Report | Ghazali 6', 85' |

Stade 7 November, Tunis
Referee: Badara Diatta (Senegal)
12 September 2010
15:30 UTC+2

| TP Mazembe (Democratic Republic of the Congo) | 2 – 1 | (Zimbabwe) Dynamos |
|---|---|---|
| Kaluyituka 59'; Singuluma 62' | Report | Kamusoko 84' |

Stade de la Kenya, Lubumbashi
Referee: Muhmed Ssegonga (Uganda)

18 September 2010
15:00 UTC+2

| Dynamos (Zimbabwe) | 0 – 1 | (Tunisia) Espérance ST |
|---|---|---|
| | | O. Darragi 21' |

National Sports Stadium, Harare
Referee: Mohamadou Mal Souley (Cameroon)
18 September 2010
14:00 UTC+1

| ES Sétif (Algeria) | 0 – 0 | (Democratic Republic of the Congo) TP Mazembe |

Stade 8 Mai 1945, Sétif
Referee: Noumandiez Doué (Ivory Coast)

=== Group B ===
| Pos | Team | Pld | W | D | L | GF | GA | GD | Pts | Qualification |
|---|---|---|---|---|---|---|---|---|---|---|
| 1 | (Algeria) JS Kabylie | 6 | 4 | 2 | 0 | 6 | 2 | +4 | 14 | Advance to knockout stage |
| 2 | (Egypt) Al Ahly | 6 | 2 | 2 | 2 | 8 | 9 | −1 | 8 | Advance to knockout stage |
| 3 | (Egypt) Ismaily | 6 | 2 | 0 | 4 | 7 | 8 | −1 | 6 | |
| 4 | (Nigeria) Heartland | 6 | 1 | 2 | 3 | 5 | 7 | −2 | 5 | |

18 July 2010
15:00 UTC+1

| Heartland (Nigeria) | 1 – 1 | (Egypt) Al-Ahly |
|---|---|---|
| Bello 49' | Report | M. Aboutrika 75' (pen.) |

Dan Anyiam Stadium, Owerri
Attendance: 6,000
Referee: Badara Diatta (Senegal)
18 July 2010
20:00 UTC+3

| Ismaily (Egypt) | 0 – 1 | (Algeria) JS Kabylie |
|---|---|---|
| | Report | Belkalem 75' |

Ismailia Stadium, Ismailia
Referee: Noumandiez Doué (Ivory Coast)

31 July 2010
21:00 UTC+1

| JS Kabylie (Algeria) | 1 – 0 | (Nigeria) Heartland |
|---|---|---|
| Hamiti 55' | Report |

Stade 1er Novembre, Tizi Ouzou
Referee: Muhmed Ssegonga (Uganda)
1 August 2010
20:30 UTC+3

| Al-Ahly (Egypt) | 2 – 1 | (Egypt) Ismaily |
|---|---|---|
| M. Talaat 58'; Gomaa 90+3' | Report | Abougrisha 80' |

Cairo Stadium, Cairo
Referee: Koman Coulibaly (Mali)

15 August 2010
21:30 UTC+2

| Ismaily (Egypt) | 1 – 0 | (Nigeria) Heartland |
|---|---|---|
| Ndubuisi 15' | Report |

Ismailia Stadium, Ismailia
Referee: Khalid Abdel Rahman (Sudan)
15 August 2010
22:00 UTC+1

| JS Kabylie (Algeria) | 1 – 0 | (Egypt) Al-Ahly |
|---|---|---|
| Ziti 25' | Report |

Stade 1er Novembre, Tizi Ouzou
Referee: Kokou Djaoupe (Togo)

29 August 2010
15:00 UTC+1

| Heartland (Nigeria) | 2 – 1 | (Egypt) Ismaily |
|---|---|---|
| Ibenegu 40'; C. Efugh 85' | Report | Soliman 31' |

Dan Anyiam Stadium, Owerri
Attendance: 5,000
Referee: Kacem Bennaceur (Tunisia)
29 August 2010
21:30 UTC+2

| Al-Ahly (Egypt) | 1 – 1 | (Algeria) JS Kabylie |
|---|---|---|
| M. Nagy 22' | Report | Tedjar 29' |

Cairo Stadium, Cairo
Attendance: 70,000
Referee: Kaoma Wellington (Zambia)

10 September 2010
22:00 UTC+1

| JS Kabylie (Algeria) | 1 – 0 | (Egypt) Ismaily |
|---|---|---|
| Azuka 87' | Report |

Stade 1er Novembre, Tizi Ouzou
Referee: Adel El Raay (Libya)
12 September 2010
20:00 UTC+3

| Al-Ahly (Egypt) | 2 – 1 | (Nigeria) Heartland |
|---|---|---|
| A. Fathy 20'; Fadl 48' | Report | Nwachi 56' |

Cairo Stadium, Cairo
Attendance: 60,000
Referee: Amanuel Ayob Russom (Eritrea)

19 September 2010
16:00 UTC+1

| Heartland (Nigeria) | 1 – 1 | (Algeria) JS Kabylie |
|---|---|---|
| Nwanna 32' | | Yaâlaoui 50' |

Dan Anyiam Stadium, Owerri
Referee: Daniel Bennett (South Africa)
19 September 2010
18:00 UTC+3

| Ismaily (Egypt) | 4 – 2 | (Egypt) Al-Ahly |
|---|---|---|
| El-Shahat 5'; Ahmed Ali 36', 74'; M. Salem 70' | | Barakat 35'; M. Talaat 87' |

Ismailia Stadium, Ismailia
Attendance: 10,000
Referee: Jerome Damon (South Africa)

== Goal scorers ==
As of 10:34 (UTC), 20 September 2010

| Rank | Player | Club | MD1 | MD2 | MD3 | MD4 | MD5 | MD6 | SF1 | SF2 | F | Total |
|---|---|---|---|---|---|---|---|---|---|---|---|---|
| 1 | (Algeria) Youcef Ghazali | (Algeria) ES Sétif | | | | 1 | 2 | | | | | 3 |
| 1 | (Zambia) **Given Singuluma** | (Democratic Republic of the Congo) **TP Mazembe** | 2 | | | | 1 | | | | | 3 |
| 1 | (Nigeria) **Michael Eneramo** | (Tunisia) **Espérance ST** | | | 1 | 2 | | | | | | 3 |
| 1 | (Tunisia) **Oussama Darragi** | (Tunisia) **Espérance ST** | | 1 | | | 1 | 1 | | | | 3 |
| 5 | (Algeria) Bouazza Feham | (Algeria) ES Sétif | | | | 2 | | | | | | 2 |
| 5 | (Algeria) Nabil Hemani | (Algeria) ES Sétif | | 2 | | | | | | | | 2 |
| 5 | (Democratic Republic of the Congo) **Dioko Kaluyituka** | (Democratic Republic of the Congo) **TP Mazembe** | | | 1 | | 1 | | | | | 2 |
| 5 | (Egypt) **Mohamed Talaat** | (Egypt) **Al-Ahly** | | 1 | | | | 1 | | | | 2 |
| 5 | (Egypt) Ahmed Ali | (Egypt) Ismaily | | | | | | 2 | | | | 2 |
| 10 | (Algeria) **Essaïd Belkalem** | (Algeria) **JS Kabylie** | 1 | | | | | | | | | 1 |
| 10 | (Algeria) **Farès Hamiti** | (Algeria) **JS Kabylie** | | 1 | | | | | | | | 1 |
| 10 | (Algeria) **Mohamed Khoutir Ziti** | (Algeria) **JS Kabylie** | | | 1 | | | | | | | 1 |
| 10 | (Algeria) **Saad Tedjar** | (Algeria) **JS Kabylie** | | | | 1 | | | | | | 1 |
| 10 | (Nigeria) **Izu Azuka** | (Algeria) **JS Kabylie** | | | | | 1 | | | | | 1 |
| 10 | (Algeria) **Nabil Yaâlaoui** | (Algeria) **JS Kabylie** | | | | | | 1 | | | | 1 |
| 10 | (Democratic Republic of the Congo) **Bedi Mbenza** | (Democratic Republic of the Congo) **TP Mazembe** | | 1 | | | | | | | | 1 |
| 10 | (Democratic Republic of the Congo) **Trésor Mputu** | (Democratic Republic of the Congo) **TP Mazembe** | | 1 | | | | | | | | 1 |
| 10 | (Democratic Republic of the Congo) **Ndandu Kasongo** | (Democratic Republic of the Congo) **TP Mazembe** | | | 1 | | | | | | | 1 |
| 10 | (Egypt) **Mohamed Aboutrika** | (Egypt) **Al-Ahly** | 1 | | | | | | | | | 1 |
| 10 | (Egypt) **Wael Gomaa** | (Egypt) **Al-Ahly** | | 1 | | | | | | | | 1 |
| 10 | (Egypt) **Mohamed Nagy** | (Egypt) **Al-Ahly** | | | | 1 | | | | | | 1 |
| 10 | (Egypt) **Ahmed Fathy** | (Egypt) **Al-Ahly** | | | | | 1 | | | | | 1 |
| 10 | (Egypt) **Mohamed Fadl** | (Egypt) **Al-Ahly** | | | | | 1 | | | | | 1 |
| 10 | (Egypt) **Mohamed Barakat** | (Egypt) **Al-Ahly** | | | | | | 1 | | | | 1 |
| 10 | (Egypt) Mohamed Abougrisha | (Egypt) Ismaily | | 1 | | | | | | | | 1 |
| 10 | (Nigeria) Ndubuisi Eze | (Egypt) Ismaily | | | 1 | | | | | | | 1 |
| 10 | (Egypt) Mohamed Soliman | (Egypt) Ismaily | | | | 1 | | | | | | 1 |
| 10 | (Egypt) Abdallah El-Shahat | (Egypt) Ismaily | | | | | | 1 | | | | 1 |
| 10 | (Egypt) Moatasem Salem | (Egypt) Ismaily | | | | | | 1 | | | | 1 |
| 10 | (Nigeria) Bello Musa Kofarmata | (Nigeria) Heartland F.C. | 1 | | | | | | | | | 1 |
| 10 | (Nigeria) Ikechukwu Ibenegbu | (Nigeria) Heartland F.C. | | | | 1 | | | | | | 1 |
| 10 | (Nigeria) Chinedu Efugh | (Nigeria) Heartland F.C. | | | | 1 | | | | | | 1 |
| 10 | (Nigeria) Emmanuel Nwachi | (Nigeria) Heartland F.C. | | | | | 1 | | | | | 1 |
| 10 | (Tunisia) **Wajdi Bouazzi** | (Tunisia) **Espérance ST** | 1 | | | | | | | | | 1 |
| 10 | (Tunisia) **Walid Hichri** | (Tunisia) **Espérance ST** | | | | 1 | | | | | | 1 |
| 10 | (Tunisia) **Mejdi Traoui** | (Tunisia) **Espérance ST** | | | | | 1 | | | | | 1 |
| 10 | (Zimbabwe) Wonder Sithole | (Zimbabwe) Dynamos | | | 1 | | | | | | | 1 |
| 10 | (Zimbabwe) Thabani Kamusoko | (Zimbabwe) Dynamos | | | | | 1 | | | | | 1 |

Players in bold are still competing in the competition
