= 2010 CAF Champions League knockout stage =

The knockout phase of the 2010 CAF Champions League will begin on 1 October 2010 and conclude by 14 November 2010. The knockout phase involves the four teams who finished in the top two in each of their groups in the group stage. Each tie is played over two legs, with each team playing one leg at home. The team that has the higher aggregate score over the two legs progresses to the next round. In the event that aggregate scores finish level, the team that scored more goals away from home over the two legs progresses. If away goals are also equal, the tie is decided by a penalty shoot-out – with no extra time being held.

== Qualified teams ==
Group	Winners	Runners-up
A	(Tunisia) Espérance ST	(Democratic Republic of the Congo) TP Mazembe
B	(Algeria) JS Kabylie	(Egypt) Al-Ahly

== Semifinals ==
3 October 2010
19:30 UTC+2

Al-Ahly (Egypt)	2 – 1	(Tunisia) Espérance ST
Fadl 38'; Fathy 68'	Report	Darragi 72'

Cairo Stadium, Cairo
Attendance: 60,000
Referee: El Raay Adel (Libya)
17 October 2010
19:15 UTC+1

Espérance ST (Tunisia)	1 – 0	(Egypt) Al-Ahly
Eneramo 1'	Report

Stade 7 November, Tunis
Attendance: 60,000
Referee: Joseph Lamptey (Ghana)

Aggregate 2 – 2. Espérance ST advanced on the away goals rule to the 2010 CAF Champions League Final.

3 October 2010
15:30 UTC+2

TP Mazembe (Democratic Republic of the Congo)	3 – 1	(Algeria) JS Kabylie
Kaluyituka 6', 89'; Kasongo 85'	Report	Yaâlaoui 69'

Stade de la Kenya, Lubumbashi
Attendance: 15,000
Referee: Diatta Badara (Senegal)
16 October 2010
20:15 UTC+1

JS Kabylie (Algeria)	0 – 0	(Democratic Republic of the Congo) TP Mazembe
	Report

Stade 1er Novembre, Tizi Ouzou
Referee: Jerome Damon (South Africa)

TP Mazembe won 3 – 1 on aggregate and advanced to the 2010 CAF Champions League Final.

== Final ==
31 October 2010
15:30 UTC+2

TP Mazembe (Democratic Republic of the Congo)	5 – 0	(Tunisia) Espérance ST
Kasongo 18', 74'; Kaluyituka 45+2' (pen.); Singuluma 56', 59'	Report

Stade de la Kenya, Lubumbashi
Attendance: 30,000
Referee: Kokou Djaoupe (Togo)
13 November 2010
18:00 UTC+1

Espérance ST (Tunisia)	1 – 1	(Democratic Republic of the Congo) TP Mazembe
Afful 23'	Report	Kanda A Mukok 69'

Stade 7 November, Tunis
Attendance: 60,000
Referee: Daniel Bennett (South Africa)

TP Mazembe won 6 – 1 on aggregate.
