= 2010 CAF Champions League =

Tournament details
- Dates: 12 February – 13 November 2010
- Teams: 58 (from 45 associations)

Final positions
- Champions: (Democratic Republic of the Congo) TP Mazembe (4th title)
- Runners-up: (Tunisia) Espérance ST

Tournament statistics
- Matches played: 102
- Goals scored: 326 (3.2 per match)
- Top scorer(s): (Nigeria) Michael Eneramo (8 goals)

The 2010 CAF Champions League was the 46th edition of Africa's premier club football tournament organized by the Confederation of African Football (CAF), and the 14th edition under the current CAF Champions League format. The winner, TP Mazembe qualified for the 2010 FIFA Club World Cup, and also played in the 2011 CAF Super Cup.

== Association team allocation ==
- Theoretically, up to 55 CAF member associations entered the 2010 CAF Champions League.
- The 12 highest ranked associations according to CAF 5-year ranking were eligible to enter 2 teams in the competition. For this year's competition, CAF used 2004-08 5-Year ranking. As a result, a maximum of 67 teams entered the tournament – although this level has never been reached.

Below is the qualification scheme for the competition. Nations are shown according to their CAF 5-year ranking – those with a ranking score have their rank and score indicated:

Association	Club	Qualifying method
Associations with two entrants (Ranked 1–14)
Tunisia (1st – 44 pts)	Espérance ST	2008–09 Tunisian Ligue Professionnelle 1 champion
Tunisia (1st – 44 pts)	Club Africain	2008–09 Tunisian Ligue Professionnelle 1 runner-up
Egypt (2nd – 36 pts)	**Al Ahly**	2008–09 Egyptian Premier League champion
Egypt (2nd – 36 pts)	Ismaily	2008–09 Egyptian Premier League runner-up
Nigeria (3rd – 21 pts)	Bayelsa United	2008–09 Nigerian Premier League champion
Nigeria (3rd – 21 pts)	**Heartland**	2008–09 Nigerian Premier League runner-up
Ghana (=4th – 13 pts)^{1}	Asante Kotoko	2008–09 Ghana Premier League runner-up
Morocco (=4th – 13 pts)	Raja Casablanca	2008–09 Botola champion
Morocco (=4th – 13 pts)	Difaa El Jadida	2008–09 Botola runner-up
Ivory Coast (6th – 11 pts)	**ASEC Mimosas**	2009 Côte d'Ivoire Premier Division champion
Ivory Coast (6th – 11 pts)	Africa Sports National	2009 Côte d'Ivoire Premier Division runner-up
Sudan (7th – 10 pts)	**Al-Hilal Omdurman**	2009 Sudan Premier League champion
Sudan (7th – 10 pts)	Al-Merrikh	2009 Sudan Premier League runner-up
Cameroon (8th – 8 pts)	Tiko United FC	2008–09 MTN Elite one champion
Cameroon (8th – 8 pts)	US Douala	2008–09 MTN Elite one runner-up
South Africa (9th – 7 pts)	Supersport United	2008–09 Premier Soccer League champion
South Africa (9th – 7 pts)	Orlando Pirates	2008–09 Premier Soccer League runner-up
Algeria (10th – 6 pts)	ES Sétif	2008–09 Algerian Championnat National champion
Algeria (10th – 6 pts)	JS Kabylie	2008–09 Algerian Championnat National runner-up
(Democratic Republic of the Congo) Congo DR (11th – 5 pts)	**TP Mazembe**	2009 Linafoot champion
(Democratic Republic of the Congo) Congo DR (11th – 5 pts)	Saint Eloi Lupopo	2009 Linafoot runner-up
Angola (12th – 4 pts)	Petro Atlético	2009 Girabola (XXXI) champion
Angola (12th – 4 pts)	Rec do Libolo	2009 Girabola (XXXI) runner-up
Libya (=13th – 3 pts)	Ittihad	2008–09 Libyan Premier League champion
Libya (=13th – 3 pts)	Ahly Benghazi	2008–09 Libyan Premier League runner-up
Zimbabwe (=13th – 3 pts)	Gunners	2009 Zimbabwe Premier Soccer League champion
Zimbabwe (=13th – 3 pts)	**Dynamos**	2009 Zimbabwe Premier Soccer League runner-up
Associations with one entrant (Fewer ranking points than the 14th CAF association)
Senegal (=13th – 3 pts)	ASC Linguère	2009 Senegal Premier League champion
Equatorial Guinea (=16th – 1 pt)	Elá Nguema	2009 Equatoguinean Premier League champion
Gabon (=16th – 1 pt)	Stade Mandji	2008–09 Gabon Championnat National D1 champion
Guinea (=16th – 1 pt)	Fello Star	2008–09 Guinée Championnat National champion
Benin	—^{2}	—
Botswana	Gaborone United	2008–09 Mascom Premier League champion
Burkina Faso	ASFA Yennenga	2008–09 Burkinabé Premier League champion
Burundi	Vital'O FC	2009 Burundi Premier League champion
Central African Republic	Tempête Mocaf	2009 Championnat de la Ligue de Bangui champion
Chad	Gazelle FC	2009 Chad Premier League champion
Comoros	Apache Club	2009 Comoros Premier League champion
(Republic of the Congo) Congo	CSMD Diables Noirs	2009 Congo Premier League champion
Ethiopia	Saint-George SA	2008–09 Ethiopian Premier League champion
(The Gambia) Gambia	Armed Forces	2009 GFA League First Division champion
Guinea-Bissau	Os Balantas	2009 Campeonato Nacional da Guiné-Bissau champion
Kenya	Sofapaka	2009 Kenyan Premier League champion
Madagascar	Ajesaia	2009 THB Champions League champion
Mali	Djoliba	2008–09 Malian Première Division champion
Mauritius	Curepipe Starlight	2008–09 Mauritian League champion
Mozambique	Ferroviário Maputo	2009 Moçambola champion
Niger	Sahel SC	2009 Niger Premier League champion
Réunion	US Stade Tamponnaise	2009 Réunion Premier League champion
Rwanda	APR	2008–09 Rwandan Premier League champion
São Tomé and Príncipe	—^{2}	—
Seychelles	La Passe	2009 Seychelles League champion
Sierra Leone	East End Lions	2009 Sierra Leone National Premier League champion
(Eswatini) Swaziland	Mbabane Swallows	2008–09 Swazi Premier League champion
Tanzania	Young Africans	2008–09 Tanzanian Premier League champion
Uganda	URA	2008–09 Ugandan Super League champion
Zambia	Zanaco	2009 Zambian Premier League champion
Zanzibar	Mafunzo	2009 Zanzibar Premier League champion

Unranked associations have no ranking points and hence are equal 20th. Bolded clubs received a bye in the preliminary round, entering the tournament in the first round.

^{1} Hearts of Oak, the champion of Ghana, did not enter the competition, citing financial problems.
^{2} A position was included for a representative of the association at the time of the draw, but the association eventually withdrew without sending a team.

== Schedule ==
Round	1st leg	2nd leg
Preliminary round	12–14 February	26–28 February
First round	19–21 March	2–4 April
Second round	23–25 April	7–9 May
Group stage	16–18 July; 30 July–1 August; 13–15 August; 27–29 August; 10–12 September; 17–19 September	
Semifinals	1–3 October	15–17 October
Final	29–31 October	12–14 November

== Qualifying rounds ==
=== Preliminary round ===
Team 1	Agg.	Team 2	1st leg	2nd leg
APR (Rwanda)	3–2	(Angola) CRD Libolo	2–2	1–0
Djoliba (Mali)	1–0	(Libya) Ahly Benghazi	1–0	0–0
ASC Linguère (Senegal)	2–2 (4–2 p)	(Ghana) Asante Kotoko	2–0	0–2
Sofapaka (Kenya)	0–2	(Egypt) Ismaily	0–0	0–2
US Stade Tamponnaise (Réunion)	5–2	(Madagascar) Ajesaia	2–1	3–1
Fello Star (Guinea)	2–4	(Morocco) Raja Casablanca	1–3	1–1
Elá Nguema (Equatorial Guinea)	3–9	(Angola) Petro Atlético	2–3	1–6
Sahel SC (Niger)	2–2 (a)	(Tunisia) Club Africain	2–1	0–1
Armed Forces (The Gambia)	1–5	(Algeria) JS Kabylie	1–2	0–3
Gazelle FC (Chad)	3–2	(Nigeria) Bayelsa United	1–0	2–2
Saint-George SA (Ethiopia)	2–4	(Sudan) Al-Merrikh	1–1	1–3
East End Lions (Sierra Leone)	4–5	(Tunisia) Espérance ST	2–2	2–3
Stade Mandji (Gabon)	1–6	(Burkina Faso) ASFA Yennenga	0–2	1–4
La Passe (Seychelles)	2–3	(Mauritius) Curepipe Starlight	1–0	1–3
Gaborone United (Botswana)	2–2 (a)	(South Africa) Orlando Pirates	0–0	2–2
Young Africans (Tanzania)	2–4	(Democratic Republic of the Congo) Saint Eloi Lupopo	2–3	0–1
Mafunzo (Zanzibar)	1–6	(Zimbabwe) Gunners	1–2	0–4
Tempête Mocaf (Central African Republic)	1–8	(Libya) Ittihad	1–2	0–6
Os Balantas (Guinea-Bissau)	0–3	(Morocco) Difaa El Jadida	0–0	0–3
URA (Uganda)	1–4	(Zambia) Zanaco	1–0	0–4
CSMD Diables Noirs (Republic of the Congo)	3–4	(Algeria) ES Sétif	3–2	0–2
Vital'O FC (Burundi)	4–4 (3–5 p)	(Cameroon) Tiko United FC	2–2	2–2
Mbabane Swallows (Eswatini)	3–5	(South Africa) Supersport United	1–3	2–2
Apache Club de Mitsamiouli (Comoros)	4–9	(Mozambique) Ferroviário Maputo	3–5	1–4

Byes: Al Ahly (Egypt), Al-Hilal Omdurman (Sudan), ASEC Mimosas (Ivory Coast), Dynamos (Zimbabwe), Heartland (Nigeria), TP Mazembe (Congo DR), Africa Sports National (Ivory Coast, drawn against champions of Benin, but the Beninese FA did not send a team) and US Douala (Cameroon, drawn against the champions of São Tomé and Príncipe, but the São Tomé and Príncipe FA did not send a team).

=== First round ===
Team 1	Agg.	Team 2	1st leg	2nd leg
APR (Rwanda)	1–2	(Democratic Republic of the Congo) TP Mazembe	1–0	0–2
Djoliba (Mali)	1–1 (4–3 p)	(Senegal) ASC Linguère	1–0	0–1
Ismaily (Egypt)	3–2	(Réunion) US Stade Tamponnaise	3–1	0–1
Africa Sports National (Ivory Coast)	1–4	(Sudan) Al-Hilal Omdurman	0–0	1–4
Raja Casablanca (Morocco)	1–2	(Angola) Petro Atlético	1–1	0–1
Club Africain (Tunisia)	1–2	(Algeria) JS Kabylie	1–1	0–1
Gazelle FC (Chad)	1–3	(Sudan) Al-Merrikh	1–1	0–2
Espérance ST (Tunisia)	7–2	(Burkina Faso) ASFA Yennenga	4–1	3–1
Curepipe Starlight (Mauritius)	0–6	(Botswana) Gaborone United	0–3	0–3
Saint Eloi Lupopo (Democratic Republic of the Congo)	0–2	(Zimbabwe) Dynamos	0–1	0–1
Gunners (Zimbabwe)	1–2	(Egypt) Al Ahly	1–0	0–2
Ittihad (Libya)	2–2 (4–3 p)	(Morocco) Difaa El Jadida	1–1	1–1
Zanaco (Zambia)	2–1	(Ivory Coast) ASEC Mimosas	1–0	1–1
US Douala (Cameroon)	0–7	(Algeria) ES Sétif	0–2	0–5
Tiko United FC (Cameroon)	3–3 (a)	(Nigeria) Heartland	2–2	1–1
Supersport United (South Africa)	3–2	(Mozambique) Ferroviário Maputo	3–0	0–2

=== Second round ===
Team 1	Agg.	Team 2	1st leg	2nd leg
Djoliba (Mali)	0–4	(Democratic Republic of the Congo) TP Mazembe	0–1	0–3
Al-Hilal Omdurman (Sudan)	1–4	(Egypt) Ismaily	0–1	1–3
JS Kabylie (Algeria)	3–2	(Angola) Petro Atlético	2–0	1–2
Espérance ST (Tunisia)	4–1	(Sudan) Al-Merrikh	3–0	1–1
Dynamos (Zimbabwe)	4–2	(Botswana) Gaborone United	4–1	0–1
Ittihad (Libya)	2–3	(Egypt) Al Ahly	2–0	0–3
ES Sétif (Algeria)	3–2	(Zambia) Zanaco	1–0	2–2
Supersport United (South Africa)	2–4	(Nigeria) Heartland	1–1	1–3

- The losing teams from the second round advance to the 2010 CAF Confederation Cup play-off round.

== Group stage ==
Key to colours in group tables
Group winners and runners-up advance to the Semi-finals

=== Group A ===
Pos	Team	Pld	W	D	L	GF	GA	GD	Pts	Qualification	ESP	TPM	ESS	DYN
1	(Tunisia) Espérance ST	6	4	1	1	9	4	+5	13	Advance to knockout stage	—	3–0	2–2	1–0
2	(Democratic Republic of the Congo) TP Mazembe	6	3	2	1	8	7	+1	11	Advance to knockout stage	2–1	—	2–2	2–1
3	(Algeria) ES Sétif	6	1	3	2	7	6	+1	6		0–1	0–0	—	3–0
4	(Zimbabwe) Dynamos	6	1	0	5	2	9	−7	3		0–1	0–2	1–0	—

=== Group B ===
Pos	Team	Pld	W	D	L	GF	GA	GD	Pts	Qualification	JSK	AHL	ISM	HEA
1	(Algeria) JS Kabylie	6	4	2	0	6	2	+4	14	Advance to knockout stage	—	1–0	1–0	1–0
2	(Egypt) Al Ahly	6	2	2	2	8	9	−1	8	Advance to knockout stage	1–1	—	2–1	2–1
3	(Egypt) Ismaily	6	2	0	4	7	8	−1	6		0–1	4–2	—	1–0
4	(Nigeria) Heartland	6	1	2	3	5	7	−2	5		1–1	1–1	2–1	—

== Knockout stage ==
=== Bracket ===
Semi-finals
1	(Democratic Republic of the Congo) TP Mazembe	3	0	3
4	(Algeria) JS Kabylie	1	0	1
3	(Egypt) Al Ahly	2	0	2
2	(Tunisia) Espérance ST (a)	1	1	2

Final
(Democratic Republic of the Congo) TP Mazembe	5	1	6
(Tunisia) Espérance ST	0	1	1

=== Semifinals ===
Team 1	Agg.	Team 2	1st leg	2nd leg
TP Mazembe (Democratic Republic of the Congo)	3–1	(Algeria) JS Kabylie	3–1	0–0
Al Ahly (Egypt)	2–2 (a)	(Tunisia) Espérance ST	2–1	0–1

=== Final ===
31 October 2010
15:30 UTC+2

TP Mazembe (Democratic Republic of the Congo)	5–0	(Tunisia) Espérance ST
Ngandu 19', 75'; Kaluyituka 45' (pen.); Singuluma 55', 59'	Report

Stade de la Kenya, Lubumbashi
Attendance: 30,000
Referee: Kokou Djaoupe (Togo)
13 November 2010
18:00 UTC+1

Espérance ST (Tunisia)	1–1	(Democratic Republic of the Congo) TP Mazembe
Afful 24'	Report	Kanda 67'

Stade 7 November, Tunis
Attendance: 60,000
Referee: Daniel Bennett (South Africa)

== Top goalscorers ==
The top scorers from the 2010 CAF Champions League are as follows:

Rank	Name	Team	Goals
1	(Nigeria) Michael Eneramo	(Tunisia) Espérance ST	8
2	(Democratic Republic of the Congo) Dioko Kaluyituka	(Democratic Republic of the Congo) TP Mazembe	7
3	(Burkina Faso) Ocansey Mandela	(Burkina Faso) ASFA Yennenga	5
3	(Zambia) Given Singuluma	(Democratic Republic of the Congo) TP Mazembe	5
3	(Tunisia) Wajdi Bouazzi	(Tunisia) Espérance ST	5
3	(Tunisia) Oussama Darragi	(Tunisia) Espérance ST	5
7	(Algeria) Lazhar Hadj Aïssa	(Algeria) ES Sétif	4
7	(Democratic Republic of the Congo) Ngandu Kasongo	(Democratic Republic of the Congo) TP Mazembe	4
7	(Democratic Republic of the Congo) Trésor Mputu	(Democratic Republic of the Congo) TP Mazembe	4
7	(Libya) Ahmed Zuway	(Libya) Al-Ittihad Tripoli	4
7	(Mali) Cheick Oumar Dabo	(Morocco) Difaa El Jadida	4
7	(Mozambique) Jerry	(Mozambique) Ferroviário Maputo	4
7	(Zambia) Makundika Sakala	(Zambia) Zanaco	4

== See also ==
- 2010 CAF Confederation Cup
- 2011 CAF Super Cup
