= Joseph Lamptey =

Ghanaian association football referee

- Born: 10 September 1974 (age 52); Accra, Ghana
- Other occupation: Senior Immigration Officer

International
Years	League	Role
2011–2017	FIFA	Referee

Joseph Lamptey (born 10 September 1974) is a former Ghanaian association football referee. He served as a FIFA referee until he was banned for life in 2017 for match fixing.

== History ==
Lamptey was born in Accra. He refereed at the 2015 Africa Cup of Nations in Equatorial Guinea and the 2016 Olympics in Brazil.

=== Match fixing scandal ===
In October 2010, during the second leg of the 2010 CAF Champions League semi-final between Tunisian club Espérance Sportive de Tunis and Egyptian club Al Ahly SC, Espérance striker Michael Eneramo scored a controversial goal using his hand. After Lamptey allowed the goal to stand, Espérance won the match 1–0 and advanced to the final on the away-goals rule. Following the match, Al Ahly filed a complaint with the Confederation of African Football (CAF). CAF subsequently banned Lamptey from officiating matches for six months.

In March 2017, the FIFA Disciplinary Committee banned Lamptey for life following allegations he manipulated the result of a match between South Africa and Senegal in a 2018 FIFA World Cup qualifying match on 12 November 2016. During the match, Lamptey wrongly awarded a penalty against Senegal's Kalidou Koulibaly, leading to a complaint by the Senegalese Football Federation (FSF). Following the upholding of Lamptey's ban by the Court of Arbitration for Sport in September 2017, FIFA announced the match would be replayed in the November window.
