= Amoako =

Amoako is a surname. Notable people with the surname include:

- Isaac Amoako (born 1983), Ghanaian footballer
- K. Y. Amoako (born 1944), Ghanaian economist and civil servant
- Prince Koranteng Amoako (born 1973), Ghanaian footballer
- Prince Amoako Jr. (born 2007), Ghanaian footballer
