= Elias Tsabalaka =

Malawian retired footballer (born 1983)

Personal information
- Date of birth: 2 April 1983 (age 43)
- Place of birth: Zimbabwe
- Height: 1.80 m (5 ft 11 in)
- Position: Center-back

Senior career*
Years	Team	Apps	(Gls)
–2007	Manzini Wanderers F.C.		
2008	ESCOM United FC		
2008–2012	Manzini Wanderers F.C.		
2012–2013	Manzini Sundowns F.C.		
2013–2014	Mbabane Swallows F.C.		

International career
2008	Malawi	1	(0)

Managerial career
- 2015–: Manzini Wanderers F.C. (assistant)
- * Club domestic league appearances and goals

Elias "The Horse" Tsabalaka is a Malawian retired footballer born in Zimbabwe.

Mistaken by some as Zimbabwean, he clarified that assumption by saying that "My mother is Zimbabwean, while my father is from Malawi. I was born in Zimbabwe and grew up playing football in that country and came straight from that country when joining Wanderers. But my family, including my sisters, brothers and grandparents are in Malawi." He has one cap for Malawi in a friendly.

With Lwazi Maziya, the 180 cm (5 ft 11 in)-tall captain was named as assistant to Kenny Ndlazi of Manzini Wanderers F.C. in 2015. The Swazi Football Coaches Association (SFCA) implored the National Football Association of Swaziland to revoke their hiring as they were "unqualified players".

== Swaziland ==
Manzini Wanderers
Captain of Manzini Wanderers F.C. for over two seasons, he wore the number 4 jersey and "earned himself accolades as one of the best defenders in the local premier league" and was said to be "good in the air defensively and offensively". He scored his first goal in four years with the "Maroon and Whites" which increased their position to 4th.

He won the Swazi Charity Cup Best Player award, which was his first individual award in his career.

He applied for Swazi citizenship in 2013, having lived there for 10 years which was enough to procure Swazi citizenship.

He left Manzini Sundowns F.C. in summer 2013 when the board decided not to renew his one-season contract.

Mbabane Swallows
Tsabalaka left Mbabane Swallows and was deregistered from the club in early 2014.

== Awards, trophies and achievements ==
- Swazi Charity Cup Best Player
- Swazi Premier League runners-up
