= MAFC =

MAFC may refer to:

- Ministry of Agriculture, Food and Cooperatives
- Magnesium-air fuel cell
- Marine A.F.C
- Millbrook A.F.C.
- Moira Albion F.C.
- Mossley A.F.C.
- Motor Action F.C.
- Murton A.F.C.
- Musselburgh Athletic F.C.
- Mwana Africa F.C.
- MAFC (basketball), (Műegyetemi Atlétikai és Football Club), a Hungarian men's basketball club based in Budapest.
- martial arts and fitness centre, a taekwondo and kickboxing club based in Wales
