= Chipo Tsodzo =

Zimbabwean footballer (born 1976)

Personal information
- Date of birth: 6 May 1976 (age 50)
- Position: Defender

Senior career*
Years	Team	Apps	(Gls)
2001–2002	Masvingo United F.C.		
2003–2005	Highlanders F.C.		
2006	Mwana Africa F.C.		
–2010	Highlanders F.C.		
2011	Zimbabwe Saints F.C.		

International career
2003	Zimbabwe	2	(0)
- * Club domestic league appearances and goals

Chipo Tsodzo (born 6 May 1976) is a Zimbabwean former football player. He played as a defender for a host of clubs in Zimbabwe as well as the national football team.
