= Twite (surname) =

Twite is a surname. Notable people with the surname include:

- Harry Twite (born 2005), Bermudian footballer
- Kabange Twite (born 1984), Congolese footballer
- Reg Twite (1911–1995), Australian rules footballer
