= Thomas Sweswe =

Zimbabwean footballer (born 1981)

Personal information
- Full name: Thomas Langu Sweswe
- Date of birth: 9 August 1981 (age 45)
- Place of birth: Gweru, Zimbabwe
- Height: 5 ft 11 in (1.80 m)
- Position: Defender

Team information
- Current team: Bidvest Wits
- Number: 13

Senior career*
| Years | Team | Apps | (Gls) |
| 2001 | CAPS United | 22 | (1) |
| 2002 | Sporting Lions | 31 | (0) |
| 2003 | Real United | 27 | (1) |
| 2004 | Highlanders FC | 26 | (0) |
| 2004–2005 | Manning Rangers | 11 | (0) |
| 2005 | Dynamos FC | 14 | (0) |
| 2006–2007 | Mwana Africa | 66 | (6) |
| 2008–2009 | Dynamos FC | 40 | (4) |
| 2009–2012 | Kaizer Chiefs | 71 | (1) |
| 2012–2014 | Bidvest Wits | 24 | (0) |

International career
| 2006– | Zimbabwe | 45 | (2) |
- * Club domestic league appearances and goals

Thomas Langu Sweswe (born 9 August 1981) is an association footballer from Zimbabwe. Sweswe is a defender, primarily operating as a centre back, and has played for nine different clubs as well as the Zimbabwe national football team.

== Club career ==
=== Early career ===
Born in Gweru in central Zimbabwe, Sweswe began his career in 2001 with CAPS United, a club based in the country's capital. He made twenty-two appearances for the team, scoring once. In 2002, he moved on to another Harare-based club, Sporting Lions FC. Despite only staying at the club for two years, Sweswe racked up sixty-one appearances for Lions. In 2004 the defender moved on again, this time to Real United in Division 1, making seven appearances and scoring only his second goal in senior football while at the club. Same year in 2004, he joined Highlanders FC, based in Bulawayo, his fourth club in as many years. Played for only three months at the club and was signed by Manning Rangers fc in South Africa after a very good performance, his arrival at the club coincided with a lack of success for Highlanders. They had previously qualified for every CAF Champions League tournament since 2000, and won the Zimbabwe Charity Shield in 2005, but failed to win any silverware during Thomas' stay in Bulawayo. He played twelve games for Highlanders FC.

=== 2005–2009 ===
Sweswe joined South African club Manning Rangers in 2004–2005, moving to a foreign club for the first time in his career and registering for Manning on 11 August 2004. He played eleven games for the club before moving back to Zimbabwe to play for Dynamos FC. Sweswe stayed at Dynamos for just one season before moving on to another Zimbabwean club, Mwana Africa FC, with which he reached Confederations cup quarter-finals and lost to TP Mazembe and played all the games in that tournament captaining the side. He played for Mwana in 2006 and 2007, as the club finished in third and sixteenth positions. After Mwana were relegated in 2007, Sweswe returned to Dynamos FC, where he had played in 2005. Dynamos finished as Zimbabwe Premier Soccer League runners-up in 2008, two points off champions Monomotapa United. They also competed in the 2008 CAF Champions League, reaching the semi-finals before being knocked out by Cotonsport Garoua of Cameroon. Sweswe played in all of their thirteen Champions League games, including both semi-final legs. In 2009 Sweswe moved to Kaizer Chiefs in South Africa after he signed a three-year contract.

=== Kaizer Chiefs ===
Thomas Sweswe returned to South Africa in the 2009–10 season, signing for arguably the biggest club in his career, Kaizer Chiefs. He made his debut for the club in the 3–1 MTN 8 2009 victory on 4 August 2009. Chiefs finished in third place in Sweswe's first season with them with Thomas playing in twenty-eight of their thirty Premier Soccer League games. Chiefs slipped to fourth in 2010–11, but Sweswe only featured in nineteen of their games, missing the end of the season through injury. He wore the no. 3 shirt for the club. he was also part of the chiefs team which beat orlando pirates in league game n telkom cup final 3-1 and 3-0 starting all the games in front of 94,000 fans at fnb stadium. and also won many man of the matches awards and player of the month awards at his club chiefs.

Sweswe scored his first goal for Kaizer Chiefs and the first Premier Soccer League goal of his career with a header in a 1–0 win over Mamelodi Sundowns on 4 December 2011. After the 2011–12 season, he was deemed surplus to requirements at Chiefs after the signing of fellow defenders Siboniso Gaxa and Morgan Gould. Sweswe's final league appearance for Kaizer Chiefs came in a 0–0 draw with AmaZulu on 20 December 2011. At chiefs in 2011–12 season he played about 17 until halfway then he got injured until his contract expired in June had a successful operation on his knee as was witnessed in the next season when he joined Bidvest Wits and went on to feature in 22 league games.

=== Bidvest Wits ===
On 27 June 2012, it was announced that Sweswe had signed a two-year contract with Bidvest Wits. Prior to joining Bidvest, the defender held talks with fellow Premier Soccer League club Black Leopards but the deal eventually fell through.

Upon joining Bidvest Wits, Sweswe was reunited with former Kaizer Chiefs teammate Tinashe Nengomasha, and he cited this, combined with the fact that he would be joining another Johannesburg-based club, as two of the main reasons for joining the Clever Boys: he told The Herald " I am happy that I have signed with a Johannesburg club. I am at home here in Johannesburg and I aim to continue working hard, as I have always done, to help my new club win trophies. It also feels good that I will be playing with Tinashe...I believe we make a good team." He played full season at Bidvest Wits and played for about 28 games in his 1st season. In 2013–14 season he was granted with SA permanent resident and was registered as a local player but never played any official games because of injuries.

In September 2012 Sweswe was ruled out for two weeks after a collision with teammate Aaron Mokoena sustained in training left the defender with deep cuts to his mouth.

== International career ==
Sweswe played for Zimbabwe at the 2007 Merdeka Tournament held in Malaysia. He scored a spectacular goal in the 4–2 loss to Singapore in Zimbabwe's opening match on 21 August 2007 from just past the half-way line. The Warriors were eventually knocked out by Myanmar in the semi-finals. They played in the Cosafa tournament in Mozambique, losing in the finals to Mozambique on penalties. In 2007 he also played for Zimbabwe National team at the COSAFA tournament and the team was coached by Joey Antipas and Madinda Ndlovu he partnered James Matola at the centre back and where knocked out in the semi finals by Mozambique via the penalties shootouts. He also participated in the CAF Confederations cup with Mwana Africa from a small town of Bindura in Zimbabwe they reached the quarter finals and where knocked out by TP Mazembe of DR CONGO.

=== 2010 ===
Sweswe played in two of Zimbabwe's 2012 African Cup of Nations qualifiers, a 1–1 draw with Liberia on 5 September and a 0–0 stalemate with Cape Verde Islands on 10 October. He also made appearances in two friendly matches, playing the final five minutes of the 3–0 loss to Brazil on 2 June in his first game back after injury, before helping his country to a 3–1 win over Mozambique in November.

=== 2011 ===
The defender played in Zimbabwe's 1–0 defeat to Mali on 26 March in a 2012 African Cup of Nations qualifier. He made his second appearance of 2011 in the return fixture against Mali, on 5 June, which Zimbabwe won 2–1.
