= Daniel Anyiam =

Nigerian footballer and coach

Personal information
- Full name: Daniel Amobi Amadi Anyiam
- Date of birth: November 26, 1926
- Date of death: July 6, 1977 (aged 50)

Youth career
- Central School

College career
Years	Team	Apps	(Gls)
- Etinam Institute and Holy Family College

Senior career*
Years	Team	Apps	(Gls)
- Zik Athletic Club
1950	Lagos UAC		
- SCOA
- Pan Bank
- PWD
- Viktoria Köln

International career
1949–1960	Nigeria	10	(1)

Managerial career
- 1954–1956: Nigeria
- 1959: East Central State
- 1964–1965: Nigeria
- 1971: Enugu Rangers
- 1971: East Central State Academicals
- * Club domestic league appearances and goals

Daniel Amobi Amadi Anyiam (November 26, 1926 – July 6, 1977) was a Nigerian football player and coach who was the national football coach of the country from 1954 to 1956 and again from 1964 to 1965. Prior to training as a coach, he was a player and was the first captain of the national team in 1949. He was also the first coach of the Enugu Rangers and was selector for the national team after the Nigerian Civil War.

A stadium in Owerri is named after him. He went to C.M.S. Central School, Nkwerre, Orlu, Etinan Institute, and Government Teacher's College, Calabar. He worked in the press offices of the West African Pilot briefly and then joined the staff of U.A.C. in Lagos where he also played football. He was U.A.C.'s captain when they won the 1950 Governor's Cup.
