= Skander Cheikh =

Tunisian footballer

Personal information
- Date of birth: 8 January 1987 (age 39)
- Place of birth: Menzel Bouzelfa, Tunisia
- Height: 1.89 m (6 ft 2 in)
- Position: Midfielder

Senior career*
Years	Team	Apps	(Gls)
2007–2011	Espérance de Tunis		
2010–2011	→ JS Kairouan (loan)		
2012	Club Africain		
2012–2013	JS Kairouan		
2013–2014	Grombalia Sports		
2014–2015	EGS Gafsa		
2016–2016	ES Métlaoui		

International career
2011	Tunisia	2	(0)
- * Club domestic league appearances and goals

Skander Cheikh (born 8 January 1987) is a Tunisian football midfielder.
