= Ziad Derbali =

Tunisian footballer

Personal information
- Date of birth: 11 October 1984 (age 42)
- Place of birth: Jilma, Tunisia
- Height: 1.91 m (6 ft 3 in)
- Position: Defender

Youth career
- AS Jelma

Senior career*
Years	Team	Apps	(Gls)
2006–2007	Olympique Béja	25	(4)
2007–2011	ES Tunis	56	(2)
2011–2013	US Monastir	42	(7)
2013–2017	CS Sfaxien	79	(3)
2017–2019	Al-Muharraq		(2)
2019	Al-Shorta	18	(0)
2019–?	Oasis Sportive Kébili		

International career
2015–2016	Tunisia	5	(0)
- * Club domestic league appearances and goals

Ziad Derbali (Arabic: زياد الدربالي; born 11 October 1984) is a Tunisian footballer who plays as a defender, most recently for Al-Shorta in the Iraqi Premier League and the Tunisian third-tier club Oasis Sportive Kébili.

== Honours ==
ES Tunis

- Tunisian Cup: 2007–08
- North African Cup Winners Cup: 2008
- Tunisian Ligue Professionnelle 1: 2008–09, 2009–10
- Arab Champions League: 2008–09

CS Sfaxien

- CAF Confederation Cup: 2013

Al-Muharraq

- Bahraini Premier League: 2017–18
- Bahraini Super Cup: 2018

Al-Shorta

- Iraqi Premier League: 2018–19
