= Wajdi Bouazzi =

Tunisian footballer

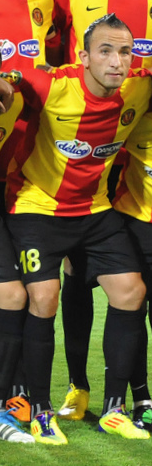

Personal information
- Full name: Wajdi Bouazzi
- Date of birth: 16 August 1985 (age 41)
- Place of birth: Kasserine, Tunisia
- Height: 1.78 m (5 ft 10 in)
- Position: Left winger

Youth career
- AS Kasserine

Senior career*
Years	Team	Apps	(Gls)
2004–2006	AS Kasserine		
2006–2013	Espérance		
2013	Lausanne-Sport	3	(0)
2016	Mesaimeer		

International career^{‡}
2012	Tunisia	1	(0)

Managerial career
- 2024: AS Soliman
- 2025: Olympique Béja
- * Club domestic league appearances and goals as of 27 August 2013 ‡ National team caps and goals as of 5 July 2013

Wajdi Bouazzi (born 16 August 1985) is a Tunisian international footballer.

== Club career ==
Bouazzi first began his footballing career with hometown club AS Kasserine. After spending two years with Kasserine, he made his big move to Tunis-based club Espérance in July 2006. It was here that the winger became regular for the team, helping the club to a runners-up position at the 2010 and 2012 editions of the CAF Champions League and actually winning the competition in 2011. Following this triumph, Bouazzi would also go on to feature at the 2011 FIFA Club World Cup as his team was only able to manage a sixth place finish. During his time with Espérance, in domestic play the club won four league titles and three Tunisian Cups.

In the summer of 2013 Bouazzi joined FC Lausanne-Sport, his first club abroad, and competed in the Swiss Super League after signing a two-year contract. However, his stay at the club was extremely brief as after three games into the season the player broke his contract with club and left by mutual consent.

== International career ==
Bouazzi is a Tunisian international and has so far earned one cap for the national team. He made his debut in a 2014 FIFA World Cup qualifier against Cape Verde on 9 June 2012 with the team claiming a 2-1 away win.

== Honours ==
=== Club ===
Espérance

- Tunisian Ligue Professionnelle 1 (4): 2008–09, 2009–10, 2010–11, 2011–12
- Tunisian Cup (3): 2007, 2008, 2011
- CAF Champions League (1): 2011
