= Farai Vimisayi =

Zimbabwean footballer (born 1983)

Personal information
- Date of birth: 30 October 1983 (age 43)
- Place of birth: Kwekwe, Zimbabwe
- Position: Forward

Senior career*
Years	Team	Apps	(Gls)
2004–2007	Lancashire Steel		
2008	Dynamos		
2009	Hwange		
2010–2011	Dynamos		
2012–2017	Hwange		
2018	Nichrut		

International career^{‡}
2009–2010	Zimbabwe	2	(0)
- * Club domestic league appearances and goals as of 13 November 2020 ‡ National team caps and goals as of 13 November 2020

Farai Vimisayi (born 30 October 1983) is a retired Zimbabwean football striker.
