= Benjamin Marere =

Zimbabwean footballer (born 1983)

Personal information
- Full name: Benjamin Marere
- Date of birth: 15 December 1983 (age 42)
- Place of birth: Zimbabwe
- Height: 1.83 m (6 ft 0 in)
- Position: Winger

Senior career*
Years	Team	Apps	(Gls)
2006 – 2007	Mwana Africa F.C.	20	(8)
2008 – 2010	Dynamos F.C.	?	(?)
2009–2010	Banants Yerevan	0	(0)
2011–2012	F.C. Platinum		
2013	Dynamos F.C.		
2014–2015	How Mine F.C.		
2016–2017	Black Rhinos F.C.		
2018–2019	Manica Diamonds F.C.		

International career
2006–2011	Zimbabwe	13	(0)
- * Club domestic league appearances and goals

Benjamin Marere (born 15 December 1983) is a retired Zimbabwean footballer, who last played for Manica Diamonds F.C. and plays as a winger.

== International career ==
Marere has also been a member of the Zimbabwe national team, participating in 13 international matches.
