= 2008–09 Tunisian Ligue Professionnelle 1 =

Tunisian Ligue Professionnelle 1
- Season: 2008–09
- Champions: Espérance de Tunis
- Promoted: AS Kasserine; ES H.Sousse
- Relegated: Avenir Sportif de La Marsa; Jendouba Sport
- Champions League: Espérance de Tunis; Club Africain
- Confederation Cup: Étoile du Sahel; CS Sfaxien
- Matches: 182
- Goals: 359 (1.97 per match)
- Top goalscorer: Michael Eneramo (18 goals)
- Biggest home win: ESS 7–0 CSHL
- Biggest away win: CAB 0–5 ESS
- Highest scoring: ESS 7–0 CSHL

The 2008–09 Tunisian Ligue Professionnelle 1 was the 54th season of top-tier football in Tunisia. It began on 8 August 2008 and concluded on 13 May 2009. The competition saw the return of two previous participants, Avenir Sportif de Kasserine and Espoir Sportif de Hammam-Sousse from Ligue Professionnelle 2. Espérance de Tunis won the championship while previous year's winnersClub Africain finished in second place.

== Clubs and venues ==
Locations of teams in the 2008–09 Tunisian Ligue Professionnelle 1

Clubs	Venue	Capacity
Avenir Sportif de Kasserine	Kassernie stadium	8.000
Avenir Sportif de La Marsa	Abdelaziz Chtioui's stadium	6.000
Club Africain	El-Menzah stadium	45.000
Bizerte Athletic F.C.	October 15th stadium	20.000
Club Sportif de Hammam-Lif	Bou Kornine stadium	8.000
Club Sportif Sfaxien	Taïeb Mhiri's stadium	22.000
El-Gawafel Sportives de Gafsa	Gafsa's 7 November stadium	12.000
Espoir Sportif de Hammam-Sousse	BouAli Lahouar stadium	6.000
Étoile Sportive du Sahel	Sousse's Olympic stadium	28.000
Espérance Sportive de Tunis	Stade 7 November	60.000
Jendouba Sport	Jendouba's municipal stadium	8.000
Olympique de Béja	Boujemaa El-Kemiti stadium	8.000
Stade Tunisien	Chedli Zouiten's stadium	20.000
Union Sportive Monastir	Mustapha Ben Jannet stadium	20.000

== Results ==
=== League table ===
Pos	Team	Pld	W	D	L	GF	GA	GD	Pts	Qualification or relegation
1	Espérance de Tunis (C)	26	18	6	2	50	21	+29	60	2010 CAF Champions League
2	Club Africain	26	16	9	1	39	14	+25	57	2010 CAF Champions League
3	Étoile du Sahel	26	15	8	3	48	17	+31	53	2010 CAF Confederation Cup
4	CS Sfaxien	26	11	10	5	33	24	+9	43	2010 CAF Confederation Cup
5	US Monastir	26	9	8	9	23	24	−1	35	
6	Stade Tunisien	26	9	7	10	30	31	−1	34	
7	CS Hammam-Lif	26	8	6	12	29	43	−14	30	
8	ES Hammam-Sousse	26	4	14	8	20	26	−6	26	
9	CA Bizertin	26	5	11	10	15	25	−10	26	
10	Olympique Béja	26	6	7	13	13	24	−11	25	
11	EGS Gafsa	26	4	13	9	18	33	−15	25	
12	AS Kasserine	26	5	9	12	16	26	−10	24	
13	AS Marsa (R)	26	4	10	12	14	24	−10	22	Relegation to the 2009–10 CLP-2
14	Jendouba Sport (R)	26	3	12	11	11	26	−15	21	Relegation to the 2009–10 CLP-2

Updated to match(es) played on May 13, 2009 - Competition concluded.. Source: Ligue 1
Rules for classification: 1) points; 2) goal difference; 3) number of goals scored.
(C) Champions; (R) Relegated

=== Result table ===
Home \ Away	ASK	ASM	CA	CAB	CSHL	CSS	EGSG	ESHS	ESS	EST	JS	OB	ST	USM
AS Kasserine	—	0–0	0–1	0–0	1–0	1–1	1–1	2–1	0–1	0–1	1–0	1–1	1–1	1–0
AS Marsa	1–0	—	1–2	0–1	0–1	0–0	0–0	4–2	1–1	0–2	0–0	1–0	0–1	1–2
Club Africain	1–0	2–0	—	1–0	4–0	1–0	3–0	1–0	1–1	3–0	4–0	1–1	3–2	1–0
CA Bizertin	1–0	0–0	0–0	—	0–0	0–0	0–1	0–0	0–5	0–0	1–1	1–0	2–0	0–1
CS Hammam-Lif	2–1	1–2	3–1	2–2	—	1–2	1–1	2–2	0–3	1–4	2–0	2–0	0–2	0–1
CS Sfaxien	2–0	1–0	0–0	4–1	2–3	—	1–0	0–0	2–1	0–0	3–1	2–0	1–1	1–1
EGS Gafsa	2–2	0–0	0–1	1–3	1–1	1–2	—	2–2	1–4	0–1	0–0	1–0	1–0	0–0
ES Hammam-Sousse	0–0	0–0	1–1	0–0	1–0	1–1	1–1	—	0–1	2–1	0–0	0–0	1–0	2–2
Étoile du Sahel	3–1	2–0	1–1	2–1	7–0	0–0	1–1	1–0	—	0–1	3–1	3–0	3–0	0–0
Espérance de Tunis	2–0	2–1	2–2	1–0	2–2	3–1	6–0	4–2	4–1	—	3–0	1–0	2–1	3–2
Jendouba Sport	2–0	0–0	1–1	0–0	0–0	1–2	0–0	1–0	0–1	0–0	—	1–0	0–1	0–0
Olympique Béja	1–1	1–0	0–1	2–1	0–1	1–0	0–0	2–1	0–0	1–1	2–1	—	0–1	0–1
Stade Tunisien	0–2	2–1	0–0	2–0	3–2	2–3	2–2	0–1	1–1	2–3	1–1	1–0	—	3–0
US Monastir	1–0	1–1	1–2	2–1	0–1	4–2	1–0	0–0	1–2	0–1	1–0	0–1	1–1	—

Updated to match(es) played on May 13, 2009. Source: Ligue 1
Legend: Blue = home team win; Yellow = draw; Red = away team win.
