= Moatasem Salem =

Egyptian footballer (born 1980)

Personal information
- Full name: Moatasem Salem Bakr Hussein
- Date of birth: 2 September 1980 (age 46)
- Place of birth: Egypt
- Height: 1.83 m (6 ft 0 in)
- Position: Centre back

Senior career*
Years	Team	Apps	(Gls)
2002–2006	Goldi	56	
2006–2012	Ismaily	267	(31)
2012–2014	Smouha	24	(1)
2014–2015	Al-Mokawloon	16	(0)
2015–2016	Petrojet	23	(1)
2016–2017	El Sharkia	27	(0)
2017–2018	El Qanah		

International career
2004–2012	Egypt	26	(4)

Managerial career
- 2018–2019: Nogoom (assistant)
- * Club domestic league appearances and goals

Moatasem Salem Bakr Hussein (Arabic: مُعْتَصِم سَالِم بَكْر حُسَيْن; born 2 September 1980) is an Egyptian retired footballer. He was also a member of the Egypt national football team. His kids are Mazen and Malek and Marwan Moatasem.

== Club career ==
Salem signed a four-year contract extension with Ismaily in June 2008, which kept him tied to the club until June 2012. However, in December 2010 Ismaily agreed to sell Salem to the highest bidder to solve their financial crisis and Zamalek SC showed their interest in the player.
