= Mohsen Abo Gresha =

Egyptian footballer (born 1981)

Personal information
- Full name: Mohamed Mohsen Abo Gresha
- Date of birth: 4 August 1981 (age 45)
- Place of birth: Ismailia, Egypt
- Height: 1.88 m (6 ft 2 in)
- Position: Striker

Team information
- Current team: Ismaily SC (Assistant coach)

Senior career*
Years	Team	Apps	(Gls)
2000–2012	Ismaily	72	(9)
2008–2009	→ Zhejiang Lucheng (Loan)	11	(0)
2012–2013	Telephonat Bani Sweif		
2013–2013	Al Masry SC		
2013–2014	Ittihad El-Shorta		

International career
2004–2009	Egypt	7	(0)

Managerial career
- 2018–2018: Ismaily SC (Caretaker)
- 2018–2019: Ismaily SC (Assist. coach)
- 2019–: Ismaily SC (Assist. coach)
- * Club domestic league appearances and goals

Mohamed Mohsen Abo Gresha (Arabic: محمد محسن أبو جريشة; born 4 August 1981) is an Egyptian former footballer.

== Career ==
In 2007, Mohsen Abo Gresha was included in the Egyptian national squad for the African Cup of Nations qualifiers. In February 2008, he started a one-year loan spell at the Chinese club Zhejiang Lucheng.

== Managerial statistics ==
As of match played 31 January 2018

Managerial record by team and tenure
Team	From	To	Record					Ref.
Team	From	To	P	W	D	L	Win %	Ref.
Ismaily	25 January 2018	31 January 2018	1	0	0	1	0.0	
Total			1	0	0	1	0.0	—
