= Bello Musa Kofarmata =

Nigerian footballer (1988–2022)

Bello Kofarmata
Personal information
- Full name: Bello Musa Kofarmata
- Date of birth: 12 May 1988
- Place of birth: Kano, Kano State, Nigeria
- Date of death: 2 November 2022 (aged 34)
- Height: 1.75 m (5 ft 9 in)
- Position: Striker

Youth career
- –2007: Buffalo F.C.

Senior career*
Years	Team	Apps	(Gls)
2007–2010	Kano Pillars		
2010–2012	Heartland F.C.		
2012–2015	Kano Pillars		
2016	Ifeanyi Ubah		
2017–2019	El-Kanemi Warriors		

International career
2007	Nigeria U20	4	(0)
2010	Nigeria	1	(0)
- * Club domestic league appearances and goals

Bello Musa Kofarmata (12 May 1988 – 2 November 2022) was a Nigerian footballer who played as a forward for Kano Pillars, Heartland F.C., Ifeanyi Ubah and El-Kanemi Warriors.

== Club career ==
With the team, with Kano Pillars he won the 2007–08 Nigerian Premier League and was with 11 goals the top scorer. In August 2008 he was on a trial at Austria's LASK and played one friendly game, the forward returned from Europe to Kano Pillars at the start of the 2008 season.

Kofarmata joined Heartland in January 2010 for a fee of five million naira. After two and half years he left Heartland F.C. and signed with league rivals Kano Pillars.

== International career ==
Kofarmata was a fringe player of the Nigeria U20 national team's squad at the 2007 FIFA U20 World Cup. He made his debut for the Nigeria senior national team on 3 March 2010, coming on as a substitute in a 5–2 home win over Congo DR.

== Death ==
Kofarmata died following a short illness on 2 November 2022, at the age of 34.
