= Déo Kanda =

Congolese footballer

Personal information
- Full name: Déogracias Kanda A Mukok
- Date of birth: 11 August 1989 (age 37)
- Place of birth: Matadi, Zaire
- Height: 1.70 m (5 ft 7 in)
- Position: Forward

Team information
- Current team: [TP Mazembe]

Youth career
- 2005–2007: Jack Trésor FC

Senior career*
| Years | Team | Apps | (Gls) |
| 2007–2009 | Motema Pembe | 2 | (0) |
| 2009–2013 | TP Mazembe | 40 | (15) |
| 2013–2014 | Raja Casablanca | 3 | (0) |
| 2014–2015 | Vita Club | 2 | (1) |
| 2015 | AEL | 0 | (0) |
| 2015–2019 | TP Mazembe | | |
| 2016 | → 4 de Abril (loan) | 5 | (1) |
| 2019– | Simba | | |

International career^{‡}
| 2011–2015 | DR Congo | 21 | (4) |
- * Club domestic league appearances and goals as of 01:05, 15 July 2013 (UTC) ‡ National team caps and goals as of 01:05, 15 July 2013 (UTC)

Deo Kanda A Mukok (born 11 August 1989) is a Congolese footballer who plays for Tanzanian club Simba as a forward.

== Career ==
Born in Matadi, Déo Kanda began playing youth football for Jack Trésor FC. He signed his first professional contract with Kinshasa side DC Motema Pembe. He moved to local rivals TP Mazembe in 2009, where he would play in the 2009 FIFA Club World Cup and the 2010 FIFA Club World Cup, coming on as a substitute in the final where they lost 3–0 to Internazionale. He scored the decisive goal as TP Mazembe won the 2010 CAF Champions League title. In April 2013, he had a trial with Egyptian giant Al Ahly, but was eventually not signed. He joined Moroccan side Raja Casablanca, signing a three-year deal in July 2013.

Déo Kanda has appeared for the DR Congo senior national team in two 2014 FIFA World Cup qualifying matches.

== Career statistics ==
Scores and results list DR Congo's goal tally first, score column indicates score after each Kanda goal.

List of international goals scored by Déo Kanda
| No. | Date | Venue | Opponent | Score | Result | Competition | Ref. |
|---|---|---|---|---|---|---|---|
| 1 | 7 October 2011 | Stade des Martyrs, Kinshasa, Democratic Republic of the Congo | Cameroon | 2–1 | 2–3 | 2012 African Cup of Nations qualification | |
| 2 | 6 November 2011 | High Performance Centre, Pretoria, South Africa | Lesotho | 2–0 | 3–0 | Friendly | |
| 3 | 17 June 2012 | Stade des Martyrs, Kinshasa, Democratic Republic of the Congo | Seychelles | 3–0 | 3–0 | 2013 Africa Cup of Nations qualification | |
| 4 | 9 September 2012 | Stade des Martyrs, Kinshasa, Democratic Republic of the Congo | Equatorial Guinea | 2–0 | 4–0 | 2013 Africa Cup of Nations qualification | |
