= Dan Anyiam Stadium =

Sports venue in Owerri, Nigeria

- Location within Nigeria
- Location: Owerri, Imo State, Nigeria
- Coordinates: 5°29′2″N 7°2′38″E
- Capacity: 10,000

Construction
- Main contractors: Vast International Company Limited (Floodlights, Scoreboard)

Tenant
- Heartland F.C.

Website
- Stadium Website

Dan Anyiam Stadium is a Nigerian multi-purpose stadium located in Owerri, Imo State.

== History ==
Located in the centre of Owerri, the capital of Imo State, the stadium is named after Daniel Anyiam, vice-captain of the first Nigeria national football team and a former manager of the national football team of Nigeria. Daniel Anyiam was the first indigenous coach of the national team, the then Green Eagles.

In 2019, the Imo State governor Emeka Ihedioha during his "Rebuild Imo Project" awarded contracts for the renovation and rehabilitation of the Dan Anyiam Stadium alongside some other projects.

== Usage ==
It is used mostly for association-football matches and is the home stadium of Heartland F.C. Heartland FC drew an average home attendance of 3,620 in the 2019-20 edition of the NPFL.

== Capacity ==
The stadium has a capacity of 10,000 people.

== See also ==
- List of association football stadiums by country
- List of stadiums
