= Ocansey Mandela =

Burkinabé footballer

Personal information
- Full name: Ocansey Mandela Amamoo
- Date of birth: 2 February 1990 (age 36)
- Position: Striker

Team information
- Current team: Horoya AC
- Number: 30

Senior career*
Years	Team	Apps	(Gls)
2008–2012	ASFA Yennenga		
2009–2010	→ CS Sfaxien (loan)		
2012–2014	Séwé Sport		
2014–	Horoya AC		

International career^{‡}
2010–2013	Burkina Faso	3	(0)
- * Club domestic league appearances and goals as of 17:52, 4 May 2018 (UTC) ‡ National team caps and goals as of 17:52, 4 May 2018 (UTC)

Ocansey Mandela Amamoo (born 2 February 1990) is a Burkinabé international footballer who plays for Horoya AC, as a striker.

== Career ==
Mandela has played club football for ASFA Yennenga, CS Sfaxien, Séwé Sport and Horoya AC. While with Séwé Sport he was selected for the 2012 Ligue 1 Team of the Year.

He made his international debut for Burkina Faso in 2010.
