= Kabange Twite =

Congolese footballer

Personal information
- Full name: Eugené Kabange Twite
- Date of birth: 4 April 1984 (age 42)
- Position: Forward

Senior career*
| Years | Team | Apps | (Gls) |
| –2006 | Saint-Éloi | | |
| 2006–2012 | APR FC | | |
| 2012–2013 | Saint-Éloi | | |
| 2013–2014 | Rayon Sports | | |
| 2014–2015 | Saint-Éloi | | |
| 2016–2019 | AS Kigali | | |

International career
| 2006 | DR Congo | 1 | (0) |
- * Club domestic league appearances and goals

Eugené Kabange Twite (born 4 April 1984) is a retired DR Congolese football striker, who last played for AS Kigali.

== Personal life ==
Kabange is twin brother of Rwanda national player Eric Gasana.
