= Mwana Africa F.C. =

Zimbabwean football club

Mwana Africa FC
- Full name: Mwana Africa Football Club
- Nickname: Potato Boys
- Ground: Trojan Mine Stadium; Bindura, Zimbabwe
- Capacity: 5,000
- Manager: Cuthbert Mutandwa
- League: Zifa Northern Region Division One
Home colours	Away colours

Mwana Africa FC is a Zimbabwean football club based in Bindura. Their home stadium is Trojan Mine Stadium.

== Achievements ==
- CBZ Cup: 1
  2006
- Nestlé Charity Shield: 1
  2007

== Performance in CAF competitions ==
- CAF Confederation Cup: 1 appearance

2007 – Intermediate Round

== Squad ==
Note: Flags indicate national team as defined under FIFA eligibility rules; some limited exceptions apply. Players may hold more than one non-FIFA nationality.

No.	Pos.	Nation	Player
6	DF	ZIM	Alfred Chinodakufa
7	FW	ZIM	Benjamin Marere
8	MF	ZIM	Webster Muronda
16	GK	ZIM	Lovemore Makwavarara
17	MF	ZIM	Milos Phiri
19	DF	ZIM	Thomas Sweswe

No.	Pos.	Nation	Player
20	FW	ZIM	Tawanda Mareya
22	MF	ZIM	Daniel Kamunenga
23	MF	ZIM	Tonderai Mutasa
24	MF	ZIM	Alisara Kondowe
