= Lwazi Maziya =

Swazi footballer

Lwazi Maziya (born 22 April 1983) is a Swazi footballer with Mbabane Swallows of the Swazi Premier League and the Swaziland national football team. He attended Alabama A&M University in the United States on a sports scholarship and studied Computer Science graduating summa cum laude. He plays central midfield and has won the Swazi Footballer of The Year Award two times. He attended Manzini Nazarene High School where he excelled both academically and in sports particularly football.

Lwazi is married to Dumisile Mdluli and they have a son Yenziwe Maziya who was born on the 2nd August 2011. He was born in a family of nine (five brothers and three sisters), he is the fifth child of Elmon Maziya. Raised in Manzini Nazarene, he attended Beaufort Nazarene and later Manzini Nazarene for his primary education. He first cut his teeth in football playing with his brothers at the age of six. He joined a local under 13 team under the tutelage of Themba Mkhabela at age 10 playing alongside his brothers and some local friends.
