= Isaac Amoako =

Ghanaian footballer

Personal information
- Date of birth: 20 August 1983 (age 43)
- Place of birth: Koforidua, Ghana
- Height: 5 ft 11 in (1.80 m)
- Position: Striker

Team information
- Current team: Dreams

Youth career
- Ba United

Senior career*
Years	Team	Apps	(Gls)
2002–2006	Ba United	?	(?)
2007–2017	Asante Kotoko	?	(?)
2018–	Dreams	?	(?)
- * Club domestic league appearances and goals

Isaac Amoako (born 20 August 1983) is a professional footballer, who currently plays as a goalkeeper for Dreams.

== Career ==
Amoako began his career with Brong-Ahafo United and signed in 2007 for Asante Kotoko.
