= Khaled Ayari =

Tunisian professional footballer

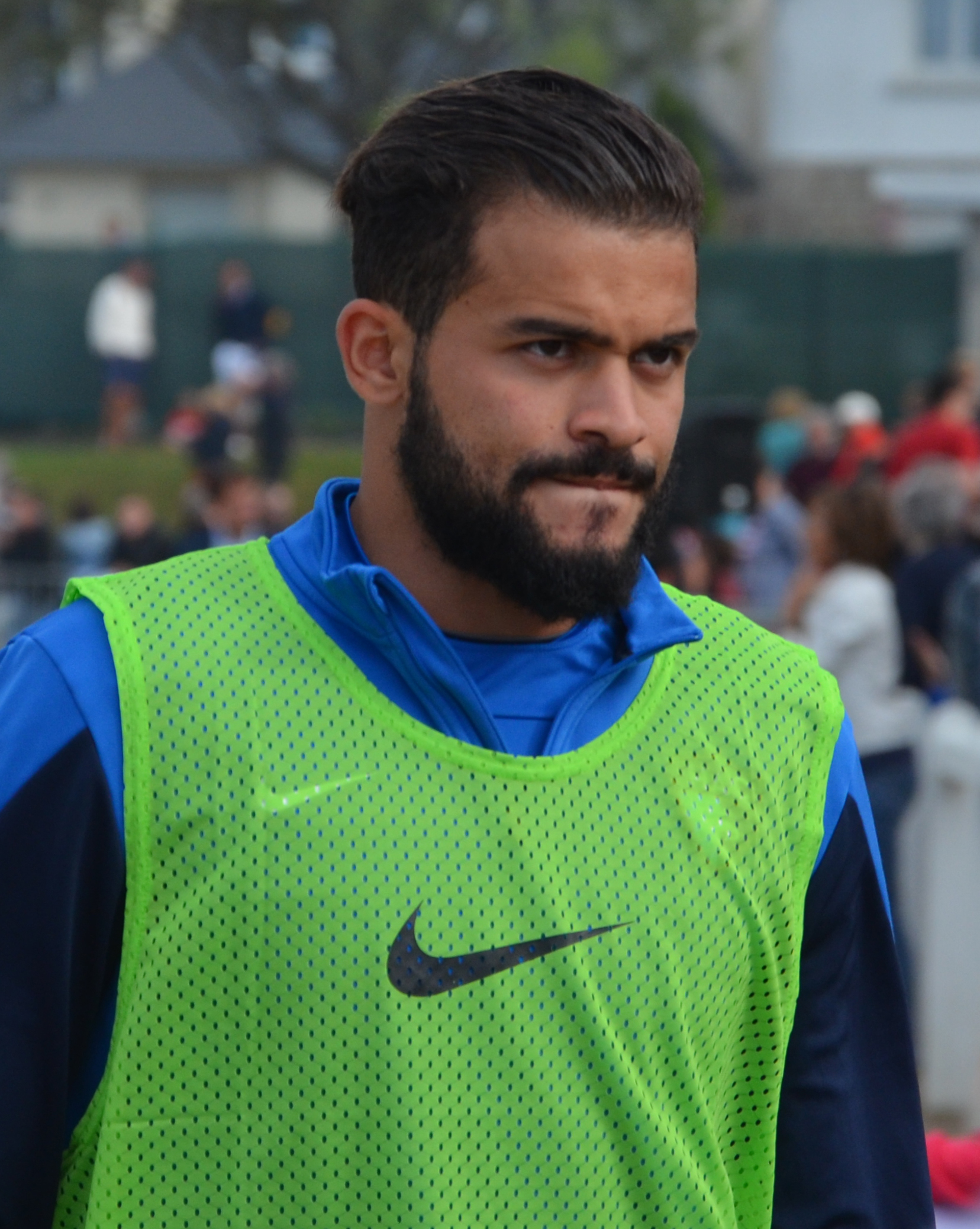
- Khaled Ayari in 2015

Personal information
- Full name: Khaled Ayari
- Date of birth: 17 January 1990 (age 36)
- Place of birth: Ariana, Tunisia
- Height: 1.78 m (5 ft 10 in)
- Position: Forward

Team information
- Current team: Hostert
- Number: 13

Youth career
- AS Ariana

Senior career*
Years	Team	Apps	(Gls)
2007–2013	Espérance de Tunis	51	(6)
2013–2015	Angers	56	(14)
2013–2015	Angers B	6	(3)
2015–2016	Paris FC	7	(0)
2016–2017	US Orléans	17	(4)
2017	Lokomotiv Plovdiv	9	(1)
2018–2019	Rodez AF	24	(2)
2020–	Hostert	8	(2)
- * Club domestic league appearances and goals as of 18:48, 7 December 2020 (UTC)

Khaled Ayari (born 17 January 1990) is a Tunisian professional footballer who plays as a forward for Luxembourg National Division club Hostert. In 2024 Khaled had 8 goal contributions in 12 appearances.

== Career ==
Ayari played for French club Orléans one season.

On 12 September 2017, he signed with Bulgarian club Lokomotiv Plovdiv for 1 1/2 years.
