= Mohamed Fadl =

Egyptian footballer (born 1980)

Personal information
- Full name: Mohamed Fadl Zahran
- Date of birth: 12 August 1980 (age 46)
- Place of birth: Cairo, Egypt
- Height: 1.89 m (6 ft 2 in)
- Position: Striker

Youth career
- Al Ahly

Senior career*
Years	Team	Apps	(Gls)
2000–2004	Al Ahly	13	(4)
2004–2004	Al-Ittihad Al-Sakndary	0	(0)
2004–2005	Kazma	24	(8)
2005–2006	El-Masry	17	(7)
2006–2009	Ismaily SC	43	(20)
2009–2011	Al Ahly	25	(9)
2011–2013	Smouha	15	(3)
2013–2015	El Mokawloon	36	(9)
2015–2015	El Entag El Harby	12	(2)
2015–2017	El Mokawloon	36	(13)

International career^{‡}
2001	Egypt U21	?	(?)
2007–2010	Egypt	8	(2)
- * Club domestic league appearances and goals ‡ National team caps and goals as of 11 February 2012

Mohamed Fadl (Arabic: محمد فضل) is a retired Egyptian football player.

Fadl played for the Egypt national football team in the 2008 African Cup of Nations. Fadl also played for the Egypt national under-17 football team in the 1997 FIFA U-17 World Championship.
