= Kokou Djaoupe =

Togolese football referee

Kokou Djaope
- Born: July 10, 1968 (age 58); Lomé, Togo

Domestic
Years	League	Role
2008–	CAF Champions League	referee

International
Years	League	Role
2003–	Confederation Africaine de Football	FIFA Listed

Kokou Djaoupe (born 10 July 1968) is a Togolese football referee, who has refereed 21 games in African competitions.

Djaoupe became a FIFA referee in 2001. He has served as a referee in 2006 and 2010 World Cup qualifiers. He was selected to be one of the referees of the 2008 and 2010 African Cup of Nations.

He is ranked 164th of the best football referees in Africa. The referee of Togo has led 21 games in the African Cup and has competed in two Cup of Africa in the last two editions.
