= Given Singuluma =

Zambian footballer (born 1986)

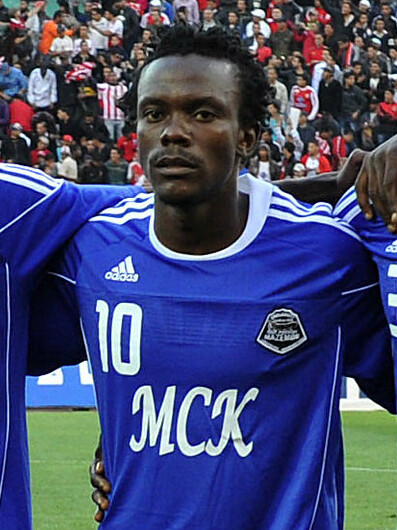
- Singuluma with TP Mazembe in 2011

Personal information
- Full name: Given Singuluma
- Date of birth: 19 July 1986 (age 40)
- Place of birth: Rufunsa, Zambia
- Height: 1.76 m (5 ft 9 in)
- Position: Attacking midfielder

Senior career*
Years	Team	Apps	(Gls)
2006–2007	National Assembly		
2007–2008	Bay United		
2008	Zanaco		
2009–2017	TP Mazembe		
2017–2019	Buildcon		

International career
2006–2017	Zambia	34	(6)
- * Club domestic league appearances and goals

Given Singuluma (born 19 July 1986) is a Zambian former professional footballer who played as an attacking midfielder.

== Club career ==
Singuluma was born in Rufunsa. He started his career at the Lusaka-based National Assembly and also had spells with Zanaco of Zambia and the South African side Bay United before moving to TP Mazembe in 2009.

He signed with Buildcon FC in December 2017.

== International career ==
Singuluma debuted for the Zambia national team in 2006 and represented the country at the Africa Cup of Nations in 2010 and 2015.

On 18 January 2015, Singuluma scored Zambia's opening goal of the 2015 Africa Cup of Nations in a 1–1 draw with the Democratic Republic of Congo.
