= Ngandu Kasongo =

Congolese footballer

Ndandu Kasongo
Personal information
- Full name: Isaac Ngandu Kasongo
- Date of birth: 6 December 1979 (age 46)
- Place of birth: Kinshasa, Zaire
- Height: 1.79 m (5 ft 10 in)
- Position: Midfielder

Senior career*
Years	Team	Apps	(Gls)
1997–2002	SC Cilu		
2003–2012	TP Mazembe		
2013–2015	CS Don Bosco		

International career
2004–2011	DR Congo	14	(1)
- * Club domestic league appearances and goals

Isaac Ngandu Kasongo (born 6 December 1979 in Kinshasa) is a retired Congolese football player, who played most of his career for TP Mazembe.

== International career ==
Ngandu was a member of the Congolese 2006 African Nations Cup team, who progressed to the quarter finals, where they were eliminated by Egypt, who eventually won the tournament. He scored a goal in the 2009 FIFA Club World Cup.

== International goals ==
#	Date	Venue	Opponent	Score	Result	Competition
1	17 January 2011	Arab Contractors Stadium, Cairo, Egypt	Kenya	1–0	1–0	2011 Nile Basin Tournament
