= Oussama Darragi =

Tunisian professional footballer

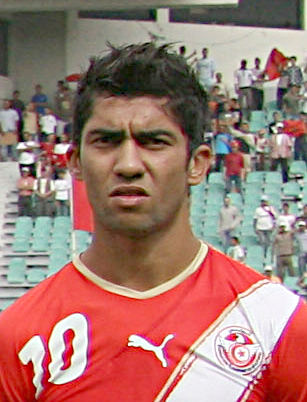
- Darragi with Tunisia in 2010

Personal information
- Full name: Oussama Darragi
- Date of birth: 3 April 1987 (age 39)
- Place of birth: Tunis, Tunisia
- Height: 1.90 m (6 ft 3 in)
- Position: Attacking midfielder

Senior career*
Years	Team	Apps	(Gls)
2007–2012	Espérance	77	(29)
2012–2013	Sion	24	(1)
2013–2015	Espérance	39	(14)
2015–2016	Al-Raed	1	(0)
2016	CA Bizertin	12	(2)
2016–2018	Club Africain	22	(5)
2018	Umm Salal SC	9	(5)
2018	Wydad AC	0	(0)
2018–2020	Club Africain	16	(2)
2020–2021	JS Kabylie	6	(0)

International career
2009–2013	Tunisia	45	(10)
- * Club domestic league appearances and goals as of 1 August 2020 (UTC)

Oussama Darragi (born 3 April 1987) is a Tunisian professional footballer who plays as an attacking midfielder.

== Club career ==
Darragi was chosen as the best player in the Tunisian league for the year 2010.

After contributing to Ésperance de Tunis winning the Tunisian League, the Tunisian Cup and the CAF Champions League, he was named the African-based Player of the Year for 2011 by the Confederation of African Football.

In January 2020, he joined JS Kabylie from Club Africain.

== International career ==
Darragi was called up to the Tunisia national team for the 2010 FIFA World Cup qualifiers. On 6 September 2009, Tunisia travelled to face Nigeria in a crucial qualifier. With the visitors trailing 2–1, Darragi scored in the 89th minute to earn a draw for his team.

=== International goals ===
Scores and results list Tunisia's goal tally first, score column indicates score after each Darragi goal.

List of international goals scored by Oussama Darragi
No.	Date	Venue	Opponent	Score	Result	Competition
1	28 May 2009	Stade Olympique de Radès, Radès, Tunisia	Sudan	1–0	4–0	Friendly
2	6 June 2009	Stade 7 November, Radès, Tunisia	Mozambique	2–0	2–0	2010 FIFA World Cup qualification (CAF)
3	6 September 2009	Abuja Stadium, Abuja, Nigeria	Nigeria	2–2	2–2	2010 FIFA World Cup qualification (CAF)
4	29 May 2011	Stade Olympique, Sousse, Tunisia	Central African Republic	1–0	3–0	Friendly
5	29 May 2011	Stade Olympique, Sousse, Tunisia	Central African Republic	3–0	3–0	Friendly
6	5 June 2011	Stade Olympique, Sousse, Tunisia	Chad	4–0	5–0	2012 Africa Cup of Nations qualification
7	7 January 2013	Al-Wakrah Stadium, Al Wakrah, Qatar	Ethiopia	1–0	1–1	Friendly
8	23 March 2013	Stade Olympique de Radès, Radès, Tunisia	Sierra Leone	1–0	2–1	2014 FIFA World Cup qualification
9	8 June 2013	National Stadium, Freetown, Sierra Leone	Sierra Leone	1–1	2–2	2014 FIFA World Cup qualification
10	16 June 2013	Estadio de Malabo, Malabo, Equatorial Guinea	Equatorial Guinea	1–1	1–1	2014 FIFA World Cup qualification

== Honours ==
Individual

- African-based Player of the Year: 2011
