= Michael Eneramo =

Nigerian footballer (1985–2026)

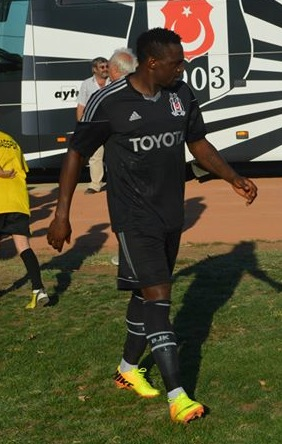
- Eneramo, playing at Beşiktaş in 2014

Personal information
- Date of birth: 26 November 1985
- Place of birth: Kaduna, Kaduna State, Nigeria
- Date of death: 24 April 2026 (aged 40)
- Place of death: Nigeria
- Height: 1.86 m (6 ft 1 in)
- Position: Striker

Youth career
- –2004: Lobi Stars

Senior career*
Years	Team	Apps	(Gls)
2004–2010	Espérance Tunis	86	(51)
2004–2006	→ USM Alger (loan)	24	(13)
2007	→ Al-Shabab (loan)	8	(1)
2011–2013	Sivasspor	77	(29)
2013–2014	Beşiktaş	4	(1)
2014	→ Karabükspor (loan)	14	(4)
2014–2015	İstanbul Başakşehir	5	(0)
2015–2016	Sivasspor	13	(1)
2017	Al-Ettifaq	5	(1)
2018	Espérance Tunis	5	(1)
2018	Türk Ocağı Limasol	13	(6)
Total		262	(110)

International career
2009–2010	Nigeria	10	(3)
- * Club domestic league appearances and goals

Michael Eneramo (26 November 1985 – 24 April 2026) was a Nigerian professional footballer who played as a striker.

== Club career ==
Eneramo began his career with Lobi Stars and was in 2004 scouted by Tunisian top club Espérance Sportive de Tunis, he was then loaned to USM Alger from 2004 through 2006, where he scored 13 goals in the Algerian Championnat National. Eneramo won the Double in 2007 with Espérance de Tunis and joined Saudi Arabian club Al-Shabab on loan in July 2007 before returning in December the same year.

On 19 January 2011, Eneramo joined Turkish side Sivasspor on a one-and-a-half-year deal. After two seasons with Sivasspor he was transferred to Beşiktaş and then loaned to Karabükspor for the 2013–14 season. During the 2014–15 season he joined İstanbul Başakşehir on a free transfer.

== International career ==
In 2008, Eneramo considered accepting Tunisian citizenship in order to become eligible to play for the Tunisia national team. He was called up to the Nigeria national team in 2009 and played his first game on 11 February 2009. In his second game with the Super Eagles, he scored the opening goal against the Republic of Ireland.

== Death ==
Eneramo died after collapsing while playing a friendly match on 24 April 2026, suffering a suspected cardiac arrest. He was 40.
