= List of football clubs in the Democratic Republic of the Congo =

The following is an incomplete list of association football clubs based in the Democratic Republic of the Congo.For a complete list see Category:Football clubs in the Democratic Republic of the Congo

== Clubs ==
=== A ===
- AC Sodigraf
- AC Mbilingos (Kindu)
- AC Nkoy (Kindu)
- AC Rangers (Kinshasa)
- AS Aigle Rouge (Isiro)
- AS Bantous (Mbuji-Mayi)
- AS Dauphins Noirs (Goma)
- AS Dragons (Kinshasa)
- AS Kabasha (Goma)
- AS Kalamu (Kinshasa)
- AS Lokole (Bumba)
- AS Mabela a Bana (Mwene-Ditu)
- AS Maïka (Uvira)
- AS Makinku (Mwene-Ditu)
- AS Maniema Union (Kindu)
- AS Momekano (Bandundu)
- AS Ndoki a Ndombe (Boma)
- AS New Soger (Lubumbashi)
- AS Nika (Kisangani)
- AS Nyuki (Butembo)
- AS Paulino (Kinshasa)
- AS Saint-Luc (Kananga)
- AS Simba (Kolwezi)
- AS Sucrière (Kwilu Ngongo)
- AS Veti (Matadi)
- AS Vita Club (Kinshasa)
- AS Vutuka (Kikwit)

=== B ===
- Bakolo Mboka (Tshikapa)
- Blessing FC (Kolwezi)

=== C ===
- Céleste FC (Mbandaka)
- CS Don Bosco (Lubumbashi)
- CS Imana (Matadi)
- CS Makiso (Kisangani)

=== E ===
- Etoile de Kivu (Bukavu)

=== D ===
- DC Virunga (Goma)
- DCMP (Kinshasa)

=== F ===
- FC Lumière (Mbandaka)
- FC Lupopo (Kikwit)
- FC MK Etanchéité (Kinshasa)
- FC Mont Bleu (Bunia)
- FC Mwangaza (Beni)
- FC Renaissance du Congo (Kinshasa)
- FC Saint-Éloi Lupopo (Lubumbashi)

=== J ===
- JS Groupe Bazano (Lubumbashi)
- JS Kinshasa
- JS Likasi (Likasi)

=== K ===
- Katumbi Football Academy (Lubumbashi)
- KFA (Lubumbashi)
- Kuya (Kinshasa)

=== L ===
- Lubumbashi Sport (Lubumbashi)

=== O ===
- OC Bukavu Dawa (Bukavu)
- OC Dynamique du Kindu (Kindu)
- OC Muungano (Bukavu)
- OC Mbongo Sport (Mbuji-Mayi)

=== R ===
- Racing Club Kinshasa (Kinshasa)

=== S ===
- SC Cilu (Lukala)
- Sharks XI FC (Kinshasa)
- SM Sanga Balende (Mbuji-Mayi)

=== T ===
- TC Elima (Matadi)
- TP Mazembe (Lubumbashi)
- TP Molunge (Mbandaka)
- TS Malekesa (Kisangani)
- TV Tshipepele (Kananga)

=== U ===
- US Bilombe (Bilombe)
- US Kenya (Lubumbashi)
- US Panda B52 (Likasi)
- US Tshinkunku (Kananga)
