= 2010 Filair Let L-410 crash =

Aviation accident in the Democratic Republic of Congo

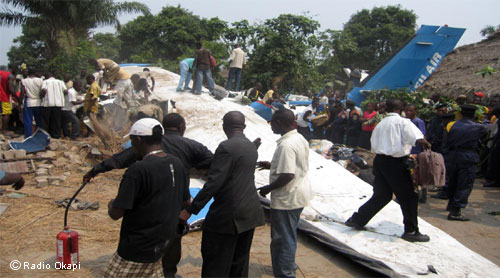
- The Let L-410 crash site

Accident
- Date: 25 August 2010
- Summary: Loss of control for undetermined reasons (possibly a crocodile entering cabin during final approach, leading to sudden center of gravity shift)
- Site: Near Bandundu Airport, Bandundu, Democratic Republic of the Congo; 3°18′40″S 17°22′24″E

Aircraft
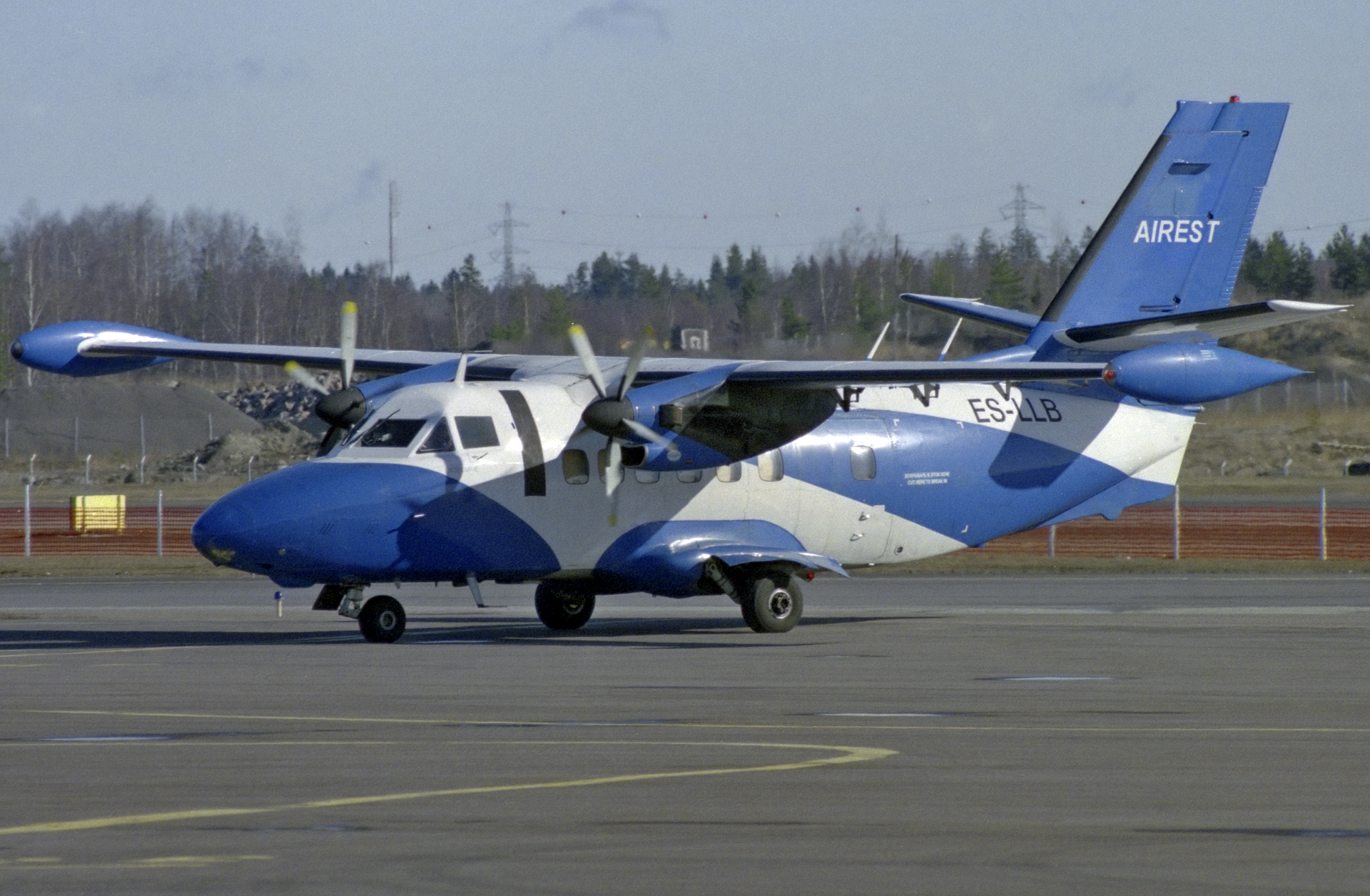
- The aircraft involved in the accident, pictured in 2004 while still in service with Airest
- Aircraft type: Let L-410UVP-E20C
- Operator: Filair
- Registration: 9Q-CCN
- Flight origin: N'Dolo Airport, Kinshasa, Democratic Republic of the Congo (DRC)
- 1st stopover: Basango Mboliasa Airport, Kiri, DRC
- 2nd stopover: Bokoro Airport, Bokoro, DRC
- 3rd stopover: Semendua Airport Semendwa, DRC
- 4th stopover: Bandundu Airport, Bandundu, DRC
- Destination: N'Dolo Airport, Kinshasa, DRC
- Occupants: 21
- Passengers: 18
- Crew: 3
- Fatalities: 20
- Injuries: 1
- Survivors: 1

On 25 August 2010, a Let L-410 Turbolet passenger aircraft of Filair crashed on approach to Bandundu Airport in the Democratic Republic of the Congo, killing all but one of the 21 people on board.

From a statement by the sole survivor, the accident was possibly the result of the occupants rushing to the front of the aircraft to escape from a crocodile smuggled on board by one of the passengers. The move compromised the aircraft's balance to the point that control of the aircraft was lost. However, some sources doubt this claim.

== Background ==
Nationality	Passengers	Crew	Total
Democratic Republic of Congo	18	1	19
Belgium	—	1	1
United Kingdom	—	1	1
Total	18	3	21

The aircraft was operating a round-robin domestic flight from Kinshasa, Democratic Republic of the Congo, stopping at Kiri, Bokoro, Semendwa and Bandundu. At 13:00 local time (12:00 UTC). The flight was piloted by 62-year-old Belgian Daniel Philemotte, who was also the owner of Filair, and his first officer, 39-year-old Briton Chris Wilson. The crew also consisted of a single flight attendant. All perished in the accident.

== Accident ==
While on final approach to Bandundu Airport, the aircraft crashed into a house approximately 1 kilometer (0.6 mi) short of the runway. According to most sources, no one was injured on the ground, but 19 people were killed instantaneously, with two survivors being taken to hospital, one of whom later died from their injuries. Of the 21 people on board, only one, a passenger, survived. Most of the dead were Congolese.

== Aircraft ==
The aircraft was a 1991-built Let L-410 Turbolet, with Congolese registration 9Q-CCN, construction number 912608. It normally carries up to 19 passengers. The aircraft involved was previously registered ES-LLB, and was operated by Airest, an Estonian airline, until 2007. It was stored until Filair bought it in 2009.

== Investigation ==
The Congolese Ministry of Transport opened an investigation into the accident. There was no post-impact fire, a circumstance that led to initial speculation that the aircraft may have suffered fuel exhaustion. However, the aircraft was later determined to have 150 litres (40 US gal) of fuel remaining in its fuel tanks.

The only survivor of the crash stated to the investigators that a crocodile smuggled in a duffel bag by one of the passengers had escaped shortly before landing, sparking panic among the passengers. The flight attendant rushed towards the cockpit, followed by all passengers, and the resulting shift in the aircraft's centre of gravity led to an irrecoverable loss of control. The crocodile reportedly survived the crash, only to be killed with a machete by authorities.

An Air Accidents Investigation Branch investigator stated that the claim was "extremely unlikely" but that they "wouldn't rule it out completely". They later stated that they were unable to draw any definitive conclusions due to not being in possession of the flight recorder data. The inquest into the death of the British first officer resulted in an open verdict, with the coroner stating that issues with obtaining black box data, and witness unreliability had only led to "vague guesses" and that further information wasn't able to be obtained.

== See also ==
- List of accidents and incidents involving airliners in the Democratic Republic of the Congo
- List of unusual deaths in the 21st century
