= Van Cauwelaert =

Van Cauwelaert is a surname. Notable people with the surname include:

- Didier Van Cauwelaert (born 1960), French writer
- Frans Van Cauwelaert (1880–1961), Belgian politician and lawyer
- Jan van Cauwelaert (1914–2016), Belgian Roman Catholic bishop
