= Pierre Botayi =

Congolese footballer (born 1993)

Personal information
- Full name: Pierre Botayi Bamato
- Date of birth: 11 March 1993 (age 33)
- Place of birth: Kinshasa, Zaïre
- Height: 1.89 m (6 ft 2 in)
- Position: Forward

Team information
- Current team: AS Kuya Sport

Senior career*
Years	Team	Apps	(Gls)
2009	AS Kuya Sport		
2010–2015	Vita Club		
2010	→ FC MK Etanchéité		
2013	→ Progresso Sambizanga		
2015	Progresso LS		
2016	Saint-Éloi Lupopo		
2016–2017	Maniema Union		
2019–2021	Panthère du Ndé		
2021–	AS Kuya Sport		

International career
2011–2012	DR Congo	2	(0)
- * Club domestic league appearances and goals

Pierre Botayi Bamato (born 11 March 1993) is a Congolese football striker who plays for AS Kuya Sport.
