= Mpenza =

Mpenza is an African surname. Notable people with the surname include:

- Mbo Mpenza (born 1976), Belgian footballer of DR Congo descent
- Émile Mpenza, Belgian footballer of DR Congo descent, brother of Mbo

== See also ==
- Mbenza Bedi, footballer from DR Congo
