= Bikoro =

- Commune
- Location in Democratic Republic of the Congo
- Coordinates: 0°45′S 18°07′E
- Country: DR Congo
- Province: Équateur
- Territory: Bikoro

Population (2012)
  - Total: 7,426

Bikoro is a market town in Équateur Province in the Democratic Republic of the Congo, lying on Lake Tumba, south of Mbandaka.

It is the administrative center of Bikoro Territory. In 2012, the estimated population was 7,426.

Bikoro was the episcopal see of the Roman Catholic Diocese of Bikoro (which started as a mission sui iuris in 1931) until its suppression in 1975.

In 2018, Bikoro was affected by an outbreak of Ebola virus disease, the ninth in the DRC's history.

== Trivia ==
There is an airfield called Bikoro Airport found in official registers with the ICAO-Code FZBC. Bikoro never had an airport as various old maps and aeronautical charts confirm. It is instead served by the airfield of Yembe-Moke (FZEM) located 7 miles north-east of the town. Additionally, the third letter "B" in the code indicates that the airport is located the former province of Bandundu. Bikoro is located in the former province of Equateur. It is therefore assumed that FZBC is actually the ICAO code intended for Bokoro airport that has been wrongly assigned due to a spelling error.
