= Etienne Ung'eyowun Bediwegi =

Congolese Catholic prelate (born 1959)

The Most Reverend Etienne Ung'eyowun Bediwegi
- Bishop of Bondo, Democratic Republic of the Congo
- Church: Catholic Church
- Archdiocese: Roman Catholic Archdiocese of Kisangani
- See: Roman Catholic Diocese of Bondo
- Appointed: 18 March 2008
- Installed: 8 June 2008
- Predecessor: Philippe Nkiere Keana
- Successor: Incumbent

Orders
- Ordination: 10 August 1988
- Consecration: 8 June 2008 by Laurent Monsengwo Pasinya
- Rank: Bishop

Personal details
- Born: Etienne Ung'eyowun Bediwegi; 6 April 1959 (age 67) Nyalebbe, Diocese of Mahagi-Nioka, Ituri Province, DR Congo

Styles of Etienne Ung'eyowun Bediwegi
- Reference style: Your Lordship; The Most Reverend
- Spoken style: His Lordship
- Religious style: Bishop

Etienne Ung'eyowun Bediwegi (born 6 April 1959) is a Congolese Catholic prelate who is the Bishop of the Roman Catholic Diocese of Bondo in the Democratic Republic of the Congo since 18 March 2008. Before that, from 10 August 1988 until he was appointed bishop, he was a priest of the Roman Catholic Diocese of Mahagi-Nioka in the DR Congo. He was appointed bishop on 18 March 2008 by Pope Benedict XVI. He was consecrated as bishop at Bondo on 8 June 2008 by Archbishop Laurent Monsengwo Pasinya, Archbishop of Kinshasa.

== Background and education ==
He was born on 6 April 1959 at Nyalebbe, Diocese of Mahagi-Nioka, Ituri Province, DR Congo. He studied in his home area for his elementary school education. He attended the Minor Seminary of Vida for his secondary school education. He studied philosophy at the Saint Augustine Seminary in Kisangani from 1982 until 1985. He then transferred to the John Paul II University Seminary of Kinshasa, where he studied Theology from 1985 until 1988. Later in 1994, he graduated with a Licentiate in Theology from the Catholic Studies Department of Kinshasa, a component of the John Paul II University Seminary. The same institution awarded him a Doctorate in the same subject in 1996. He also undertook research studies at the Biblical Institute of Fribourg in Switzerland from 1999 until 2002.

== Priest ==
On 10 August 1988 he was ordained a priest of the Roman Catholic Diocese of Mahagi-Nioka, in the Democratic Republic of the Congo. He served as a priest until 18 March 2008.

While a priest, he served in various roles including as:

- Professor of Theology St. Cyprien Seminary in Bunia, DRC from 1990 until 1994.
- Assistant to the general bursar of the Diocese of Mahagi-Nioka in 1996.
- Professor and spiritual director at the Theologate of St. Cyprien of Bunia from 1999 until 2002.
- Adjunct secretary general of the national episcopal conference of the Democratic Republic of the Congo since 2002.

== Bishop ==
Pope Benedict XVI appointed him Bishop of Bondo on 18 March 2008. He was consecrated and installed at Bondo on 8 June 2008 by the hands of Archbishop Laurent Monsengwo Pasinya, Archbishop of Kinshasa assisted by Bishop Richard Domba Mady, Bishop of Doruma-Dungu and Bishop Marcel Utembi Tapa, Bishop of Mahagi-Nioka.

== See also ==
- Catholic Church in the Democratic Republic of the Congo

== Succession table ==
Catholic Church titles
Preceded by Philippe Nkiere Keana (13 November 1992 - 27 July 2005)	Bishop of Bondo (since 18 March 2008)	Succeeded by Incumbent
