= Bandundu =

Bandundu may refer to:

- Bandundu (city), a city in the DRC
- Bandundu Province, a former province of the DRC
