= Bandundu Airport =

Bandundu Airport Aéroport de Bandundu
- IATA: FDU; ICAO: FZBO

Summary
- Airport type: Public
- Location: Bandundu, Democratic Republic of the Congo
- Elevation AMSL: 1,053 ft (321 m)
- Coordinates: 3°18′40″S 17°22′54″E

Map
- Location in the Democratic Republic of the Congo

Runways
Direction	Length		Surface
Direction	m	ft	Surface
11/29	1,375	4,511	Asphalt
- Source: WAD GCM

Bandundu Airport (IATA: FDU, ICAO: FZBO) (French: Aéroport de Bandundu) is an inactive airport, which used to serve Bandundu, capital of the Kwilu Province in the Democratic Republic of the Congo.

The Bandundu non-directional beacon (Ident: BAN) is located on the field.

== Airlines and destinations ==
=== Passenger ===
Airlines	Destinations
Kin Avia	Kinshasa–N'Dolo

=== Cargo ===
- Cargo Bull Aviation

== Accidents and incidents ==
Two occurrences are reported to have occurred on 17 July 2007 at Bandundu. The reports may refer to the same occurrence with factual errors:

- In one report, a Let-410UVP, tail number 9Q-CIM of Cargo Bull Aviation suffered a bird strike and crashed with no injuries but aircraft written off.
- In the other report an Antonov (either an An-24 or An-32) that had stopped en route from Kinshasa N'Dolo Airport to Nioki Airport lost its number 1 engine during initial climb and crashed 8 kilometres (5.0 mi) from Bandundu with substantial damage but no injuries. Another report has this occurring the next day with a minor injury to an Austrian pilot. Another identifies the operator as Malift Air, the date as 18 July, the failure as an engine explosion during landing, and the aircraft destroyed.

In 2010, a Let-410 of Filair crashed near the airfield.

== See also ==
- Transport in Democratic Republic of the Congo
- List of airports in Democratic Republic of the Congo
