= List of Al-Duhail SC international footballers =

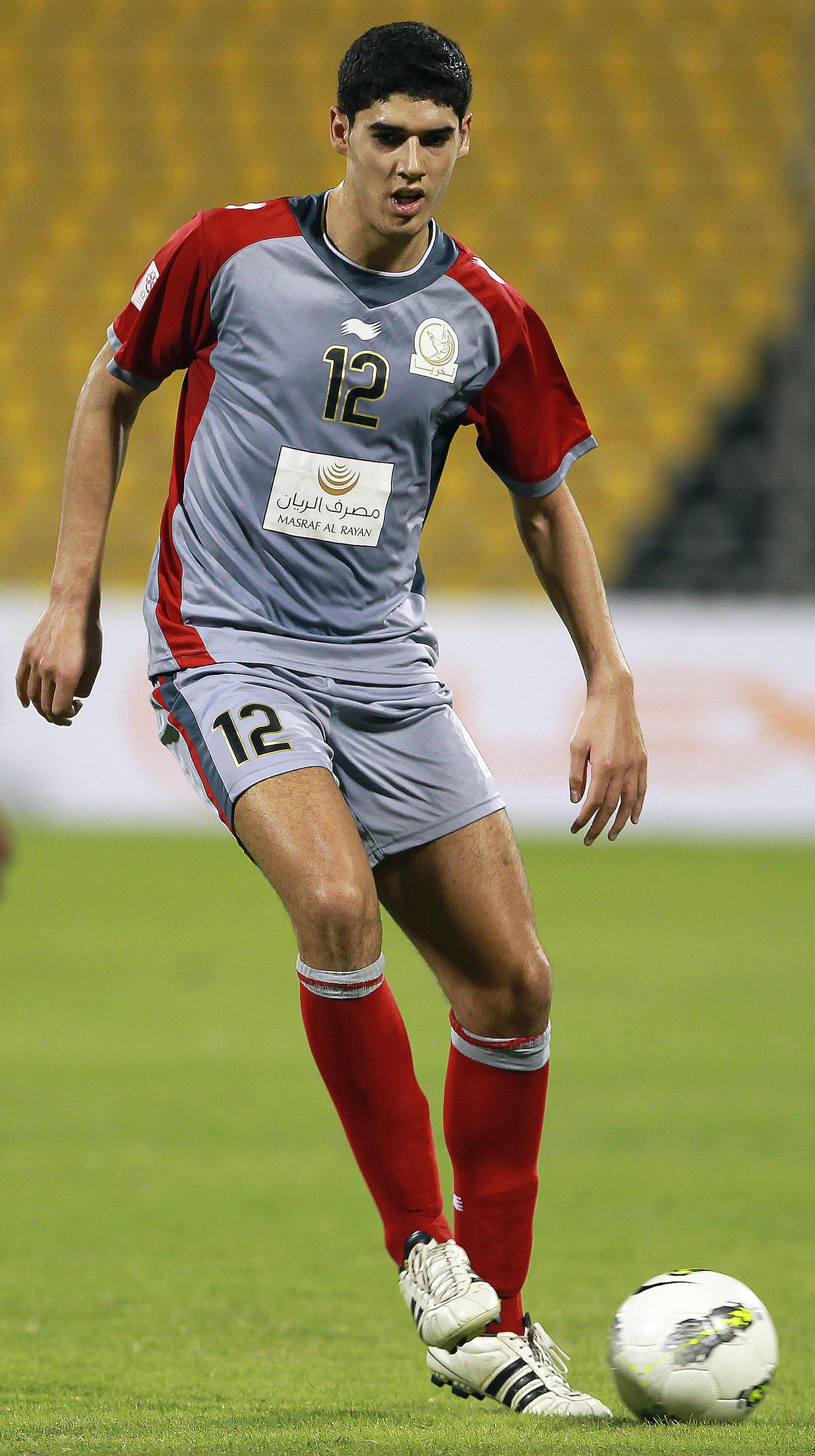
Karim Boudiaf more than represented a national team from Al-Duhail SC with 106 matches and won the 2019 AFC Asian Cup with Qatar.

This is a list of players, past and present, who have been capped by their country in international football whilst playing for Al-Duhail Sports Club. From nine countries from three continents and the first continental tournament in which players from Al-Duhail SC participated was the 2011 AFC Asian Cup: Khalid Muftah with Qatar and Jasur Hasanov with Uzbekistan, in the 2015 AFC Asian Cup with his domination of local championships, On 23 December 2014, manager Djamel Belmadi chose his 23-man squad, including 5 players from Al-Duhail SC they are Mohammed Musa, Ismaeel Mohammad, Tresor Kangambu, Karim Boudiaf and Khalid Muftah for the second time. but it was a disastrous participation, as Qatar national team was defeated in all its matches to be eliminated from the group stage. The South Korea national team included Nam Tae-hee in his first participation in the AFC Asian Cup, where he achieved the runner-up after losing in the final against Australia. In 2019 AFC Asian Cup, the Qatari national team excelled and achieved the surprise by winning the title after winning the final against Japan. Five players from Al-Duhail SC were included in the squad. Almoez Ali won the tournament's top scorer title with nine goals, including four against North Korea, Ali and Bassam Al-Rawi were in Team of the tournament.

== Players ==
Key
GK	Goalkeeper
DF	Defender
MF	Midfielder
FW	Forward
Bold	Still playing competitive football

=== Qatari players ===
Al-Duhail SC Qatari international footballers
Name	Position	Date of first cap	Debut against	Date of last cap	Final match against	Caps	Ref
**Karim Boudiaf**	MF	21 Dec 2013	Bahrain	18 Dec 2021	Egypt	106	
**Ahmed Yasser**	DF	23 Jan 2012	Sweden	11 Oct 2016	Syria	24	
Adel Lami	MF	16 Dec 2011	Iraq	9 Sep 2013	Lebanon	11	
**Amine Lecomte**	GK	26 Mar 2015	Algeria	1 Sep 2016	Iran	18	
Tresor Kangambu	MF	27 Dec 2014	Estonia	25 Aug 2016	Thailand	11	
Baba Malick	GK	29 Mar 2011	Russia	7 Nov 2012	Iraq	7	
**Khalid Muftah**	DF	16 Dec 2010	Egypt	18 Aug 2016	Jordan	46	
Dame Traoré	DF	21 Dec 2013	Bahrain	31 May 2015	Northern Ireland	7	
**Sebastián Soria**	FW	6 Sep 2012	Tajikistan	14 Oct 2014	Australia	26	
**Assim Madibo**	MF	7 Sep 2018	China	18 Dec 2021	Egypt	33	
**Mohammed Muntari**	FW	28 Aug 2015	Singapore	18 Dec 2021	Egypt	35	
**Abdullah Al-Ahrak**	MF	23 Aug 2017	Turkmenistan	18 Dec 2021	Egypt	25	
**Almoez Ali**	FW	21 Dec 2013	Bahrain	18 Dec 2021	Egypt	76	
**Luiz Júnior**	DF	21 Dec 2013	Bahrain	6 Jun 2017	North Korea	27	
**Ali Afif**	MF	28 Dec 2012	Egypt	5 Sep 2019	Afghanistan	21	
**Bassam Al-Rawi**	DF	11 Nov 2017	Czech Republic	15 Dec 2021	Algeria	49	

=== Foreign players ===
Al-Duhail SC Foreign international footballers
Name	Position	Date of first cap	Debut against	Date of last cap	Final match against	Caps	Ref
(Algeria) Madjid Bougherra	DF	3 Sep 2011	Tanzania	30 Jun 2014	Germany	17	
(Morocco) **Youssef El-Arabi**	FW	8 Oct 2016	Gabon	16 Jan 2017	DR Congo	3	
(Uzbekistan) **Jasur Hasanov**	MF	25 Dec 2010	Bahrain	25 Jan 2011	Australia	6	
(Slovakia) **Vladimír Weiss**	MF	5 Mar 2014	Israel	17 Nov 2015	Iceland	16	
(Belgium) **Toby Alderweireld**	DF	2 Sep 2021	Estonia	10 Oct 2021	Italy	5	
(Tunisia) **Youssef Msakni**	FW	10 Jan 2013	Gabon	17 Nov 2021	Tanzania	43	
(South Korea) **Nam Tae-hee**	MF	30 May 2012	Spain	2 Sep 2021	Iraq	39	
(Tunisia) **Ferjani Sassi**	MF	3 Sep 2021	Equatorial Guinea	18 Dec 2021	Algeria	11	
(Kenya) **Michael Olunga**	FW	25 Mar 2021	Egypt	15 Nov 2021	Rwanda	7	
(Iraq) Nashat Akram	MF	19 Aug 2011	Qatar	15 Nov 2011	Jordan	6	

== Players in international competitions ==
=== Asian Cup Players ===
(Qatar) 2011 Asian Cup

- (Qatar) Khalid Muftah
- (Uzbekistan) Jasur Hasanov

(Australia) 2015 Asian Cup

- (Qatar) Mohammed Musa
- (Qatar) Khalid Muftah
- (Qatar) Ismaeel Mohammad
- (Qatar) Tresor Kangambu
- (Qatar) Karim Boudiaf
- (South Korea) Nam Tae-hee

(United Arab Emirates) 2019 Asian Cup

- (Qatar) Karim Boudiaf
- (Qatar) Bassam Al-Rawi
- (Qatar) Almoez Ali
- (Qatar) Ali Afif
- (Qatar) Assim Madibo

=== African Cup, Copa América, Gold Cup, Players ===
(Brazil) 2019 Copa América

- (Qatar) Abdullah Al-Ahrak
- (Qatar) Karim Boudiaf
- (Qatar) Bassam Al-Rawi
- (Qatar) Almoez Ali
- (Qatar) Ali Afif
- (Qatar) Assim Madibo

(United States) 2021 CONCACAF Gold Cup

- (Qatar) Mohammed Muntari
- (Qatar) Karim Boudiaf
- (Qatar) Bassam Al-Rawi
- (Qatar) Almoez Ali
- (Qatar) Abdullah Al-Ahrak
- (Qatar) Assim Madibo

=== World Cup Players ===
(Qatar) 2022 FIFA World Cup

- (Qatar) Mohammed Muntari
- (Qatar) Karim Boudiaf
- (Qatar) Bassam Al-Rawi
- (Qatar) Ismaeel Mohammad
- (Qatar) Almoez Ali
- (Qatar) Assim Madibo
