= Diocese of Bondo =

The Diocese of Bondo may refer to:

- Anglican Diocese of Bondo, in Bondo, Kenya
- Roman Catholic Diocese of Bondo, in Bondo, Democratic Republic of the Congo
