= Philippe Nkiere Keana =

Democratic Republic of Congo Catholic bishop (1938–2024)

His Excellency Philippe Nkiere Keana
- Bishop Emeritus of Inongo
- Archdiocese: Kinshasa
- Diocese: Inongo
- Appointed: 27 July 2005
- Term ended: 31 March 2018
- Predecessor: Léon Lesambo Ndamwize
- Successor: Donatien Bafuidinsoni Maloko-Mana
- Previous posts: Coadjutor Bishop of Bondo (1991–1992); Bishop of Bongo (1992–2005)

Orders
- Ordination: 2 August 1965
- Consecration: 6 January 1992 by Pope John Paul II

Personal details
- Born: 21 February 1938 Bokoro, Belgian Congo
- Died: 6 November 2024 (aged 86) Kinshasa, DR Congo
- Motto: Regnat Christus Dominus (Christ the Lord reigns)

Philippe Nkiere Keana (21 February 1938 – 6 November 2024) was a Roman Catholic bishop in the Democratic Republic of the Congo.

== Biography ==
Keana was born in Bokoro on 21 February 1938. He was ordained as a priest in 1965 and as Coadjutor Bishop of Bondo in January 1992, becoming Bishop of Bondo in November 1992.

Keana was appointed Bishop of Inongo in 2005 and retired in 2018. He was succeeded as Bishop of Inongo by Donatien Bafuidinsoni Maloko-Mana.

Keana died in Kinshasa on 6 November 2024, at the age of 86.

Catholic Church titles
Preceded by Léon Lesambo Ndamwize	Bishop of Inongo; 2005–2018	Succeeded by Donatien Bafuidinsoni Maloko-Mana
Preceded by Marcel Bam’ba Gongoa	Bishop of Bondo; 1992–2005	Succeeded by Etienne Ung’eyowun Bediwegi
Preceded by —	Coadjutor Bishop of Bondo; 1991–1992	Succeeded by —
