= Airest =

Aviation company based in Estonia

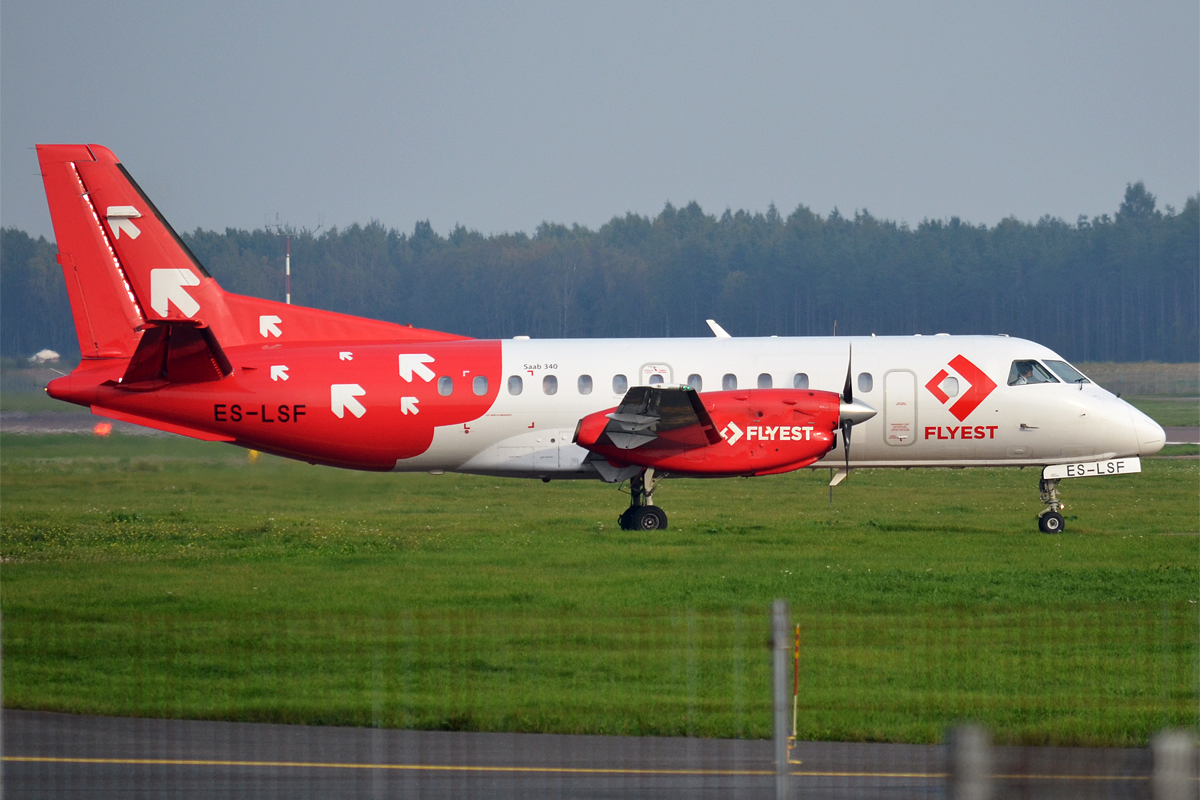
- Saab 340
IATA	ICAO	Call sign
–	AEG	AIREST CARGO
- Founded: 2002; 24 years ago
- Hubs: Tallinn Airport; Billund Airport; Karlsruhe/Baden-Baden Airport; Göteborg Landvetter Airport
- Subsidiaries: Flyest
- Fleet size: 6
- Destinations: 14
- Headquarters: Tallinn, Estonia
- Key people: Aleksei Lupitski
- Website: www.airest.aero

AS Airest is an Estonian-owned airline currently operating cargo and passenger charter flights. It is an Estonian private aviation company engaged in commercial cargo air transportation in accordance with EU-OPS Part 1. Headquartered in Tallinn, Airest services cargo partners in Northern Europe.

== History ==
=== Early operations ===
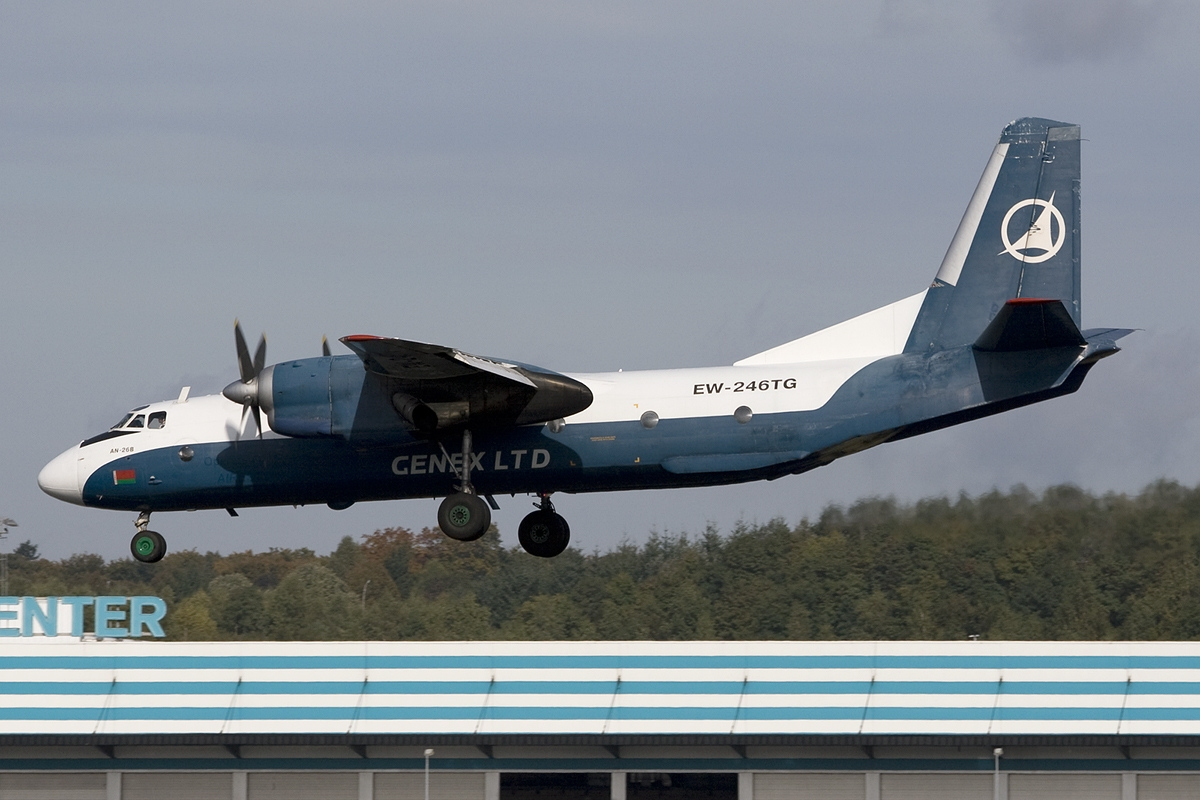
Antonov An-26B

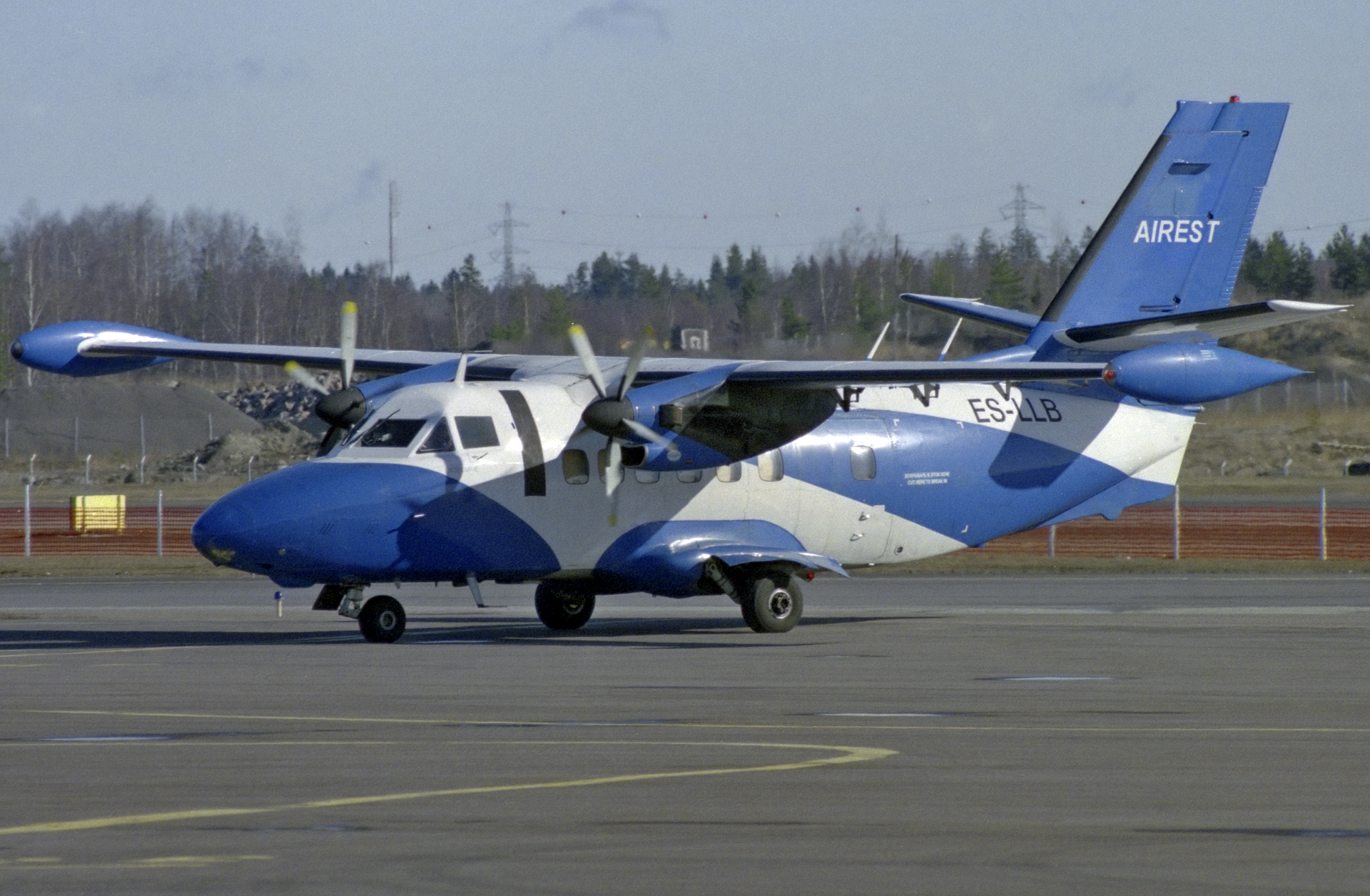
LET L-410

The airline was firstly established in 1996 and started air freight operations shortly after. The fleet was formed by aircraft of Soviet and Czech origin, Antonov 26B and Aircraft Industries L-410 UVP-E, respectively, with cargo interiors. The operations continued for a certain period until, due to a reduction in transport requests, they were suspended for a few years.

=== Relaunch ===
The air carrier was reactivated in early 2000s and launched scheduled cargo flights on January 15, 2002.

In early 2012, Estonian Civil Aviation Administration issued a new Air Operator Certificate (AOC) and in that same year Airest disclosed a new graphic image, website and bulletin. On July 11, 2013, the airline was certified by ECAA as EASA Part 145 maintenance organization. In September 2014, Airest signed a contract for a 5th SAAB 340a aircraft to be added to the fleet. Registered ES-LSE and nicknamed "Echo" will be flying in Hungary and Romania. As of September 15, 2014, Airest was flying to 14 European destinations and had four line maintenance bases. The fleet often reached destinations such as Baden-Baden, Billund, Budapest, Cluj-Napoca, Gothenburg, Helsinki, Jönköping, Malmö, Stavanger, Stockholm, Tampere, Tallinn, Timișoara and Turku.

=== FLYEST subsidiary ===
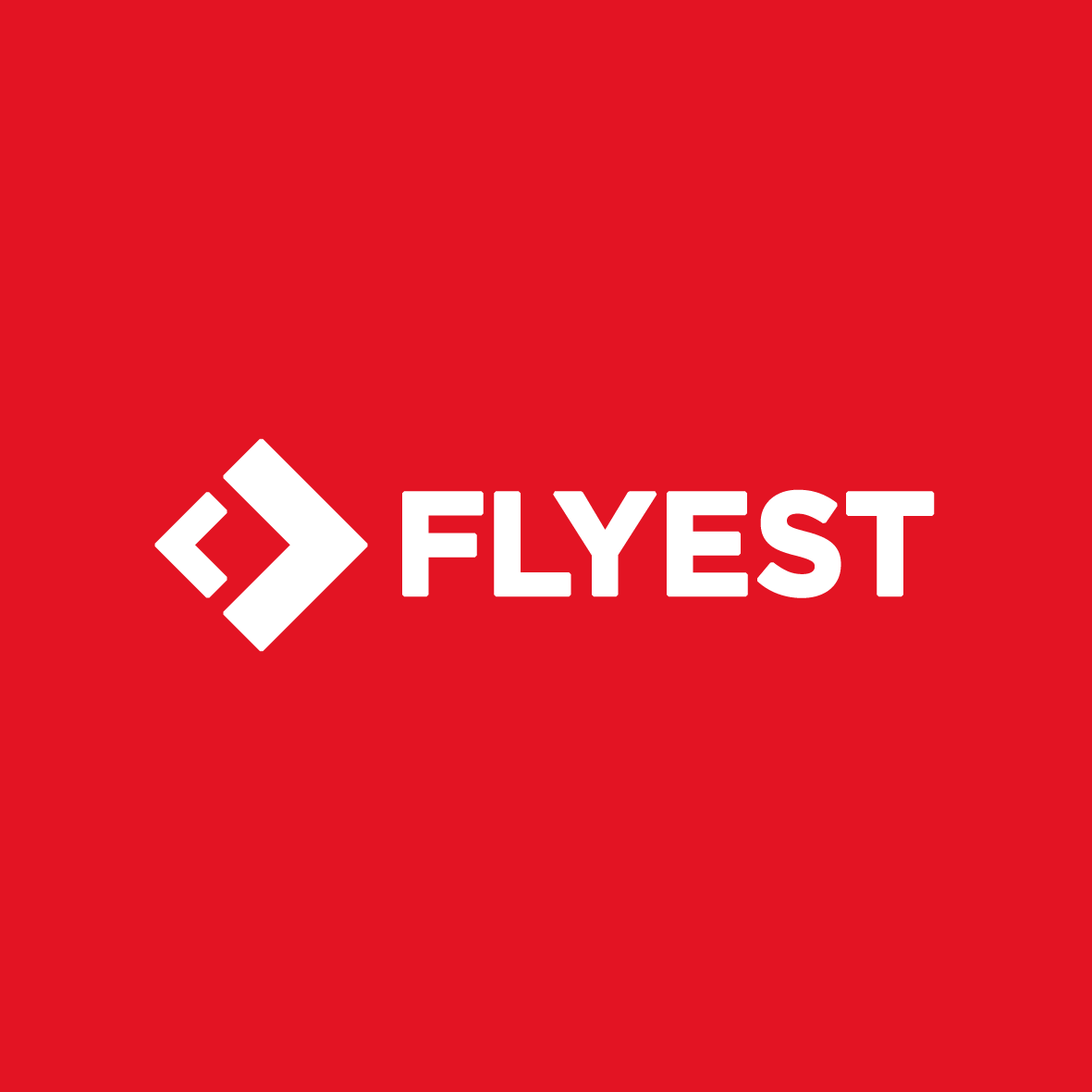

On 31 August 2015, Airest announced the launch of a subsidiary named FLYEST, a new passenger airline with a plan to innovate charter and personal flights and also fly services to regional and international points. Flyest's first aircraft - a Saab 340 registered ES-LSF - started flying on Estonian Air behalf the Stockholm-Tallinn-Saint Petersburg route that same day. Airest was also operating on lines to Oslo and Vilnius. On the following 7 November, because of Estonian Air bankruptcy, Airest ihalted the route route. In accordance with the feedback from Estonian Air, the service provided by Airest was precise and satisfying. On 23 November, a deal was closed for buying two Saab 340 aircraft. Airest was now operating with eight such aircraft. New members of the fleet with nicknames "Golf" and "Hotel" - both being all-cargo planes - were located at the Budapest station which became the largest of four stations with four permanently based aircraft. Lastly, on 17 December, Airest's Saab 340 registered ES-LSF started flying as FLYEST the Pori-Helsinki route with a 1-year contract.

On 9 October 2017, Airest announced the appointment of Aleksei Lupitski as new CEO. He took office on 2 October succeeding Jaanus Ojamets, who stepped down for personal reasons. Lupitski had vast experience in airline industry, holding prominent positions in various airlines for the last 20 years. For the past 8 years he was the President & CEO of Lithuanian airline Avion Express. On 9 March 2020, Airest ferried its first Airbus A320 aircraft (ES-LAA) from Mexico City Airport to Tallinn Airport with a stopover at Montréal–Mirabel Airport. The twin-engine aircraft was used for some time in medium-haul charter flights.

=== Technical skills ===
Aires is proud of maintenance organization that is to say line maintenance on SAAB 340 up to 800 flying hours. The station in Tallinn started working from August 1, 2013. In November 2014, Airest opened its 4th line maintenance base in Budapest.

== Destinations ==
Airest operates scheduled cargo flights to the following destinations:

Denmark

- Billund Airport

Estonia:

- Tallinn Airport

Finland:

- Helsinki Airport

Germany

- Karlsruhe/Baden-Baden Airport

Great Britain

- Birmingham Airport

Hungary

- Budapest Ferenc Liszt International Airport

Moldova

- Chișinău International Airport

Norway

- Oslo Airport, Gardemoen
- Stavanger Airport, Sola

Republic of Ireland

- Dublin Airport

Romania

- Bucharest – Henri Coandă International Airport
- Timișoara – Traian Vuia International Airport

Sweden

- Stockholm Arlanda Airport
- Göteborg Landvetter Airport
- Jönköping Airport
- Malmö Airport

== Fleet ==
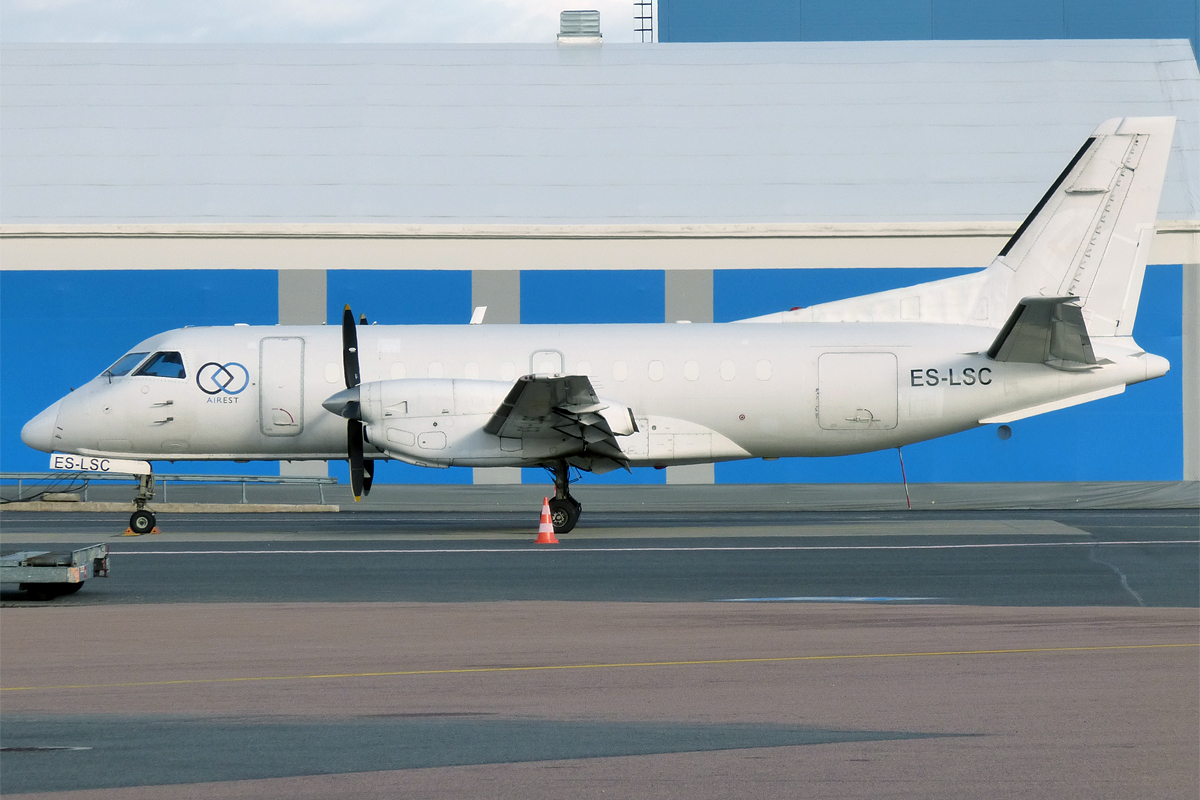
Saab 340Fs operate cargo flights

As of July 2026, the Airest operates the following aircraft

Airest fleet in Estonian aircraft registry
Aircraft	In Service	Payload	Passengers	Notes
Saab 340AF	5	3,680 kg	—	Registration/Serial number: ES-LSA/055, ES-LSC/037, ES-LSG/007, ES-LSH/011, ES-LSI/064
ATR 72-500F	1			Registration/Serial number: ES-LTZ/715; leased
Total	6			

=== Past fleet ===
As of July 2022, the Airest fleet consists of the following aircraft:

Airest past fleet
Aircraft	In Service	Payload	Passengers	Notes
Saab 340AF	8	3,680 kg	—	
Saab 340A	1	—	33	
Total	9			

As of August 2006, the Airest fleet included as per GSA worldwide Nordic European Aviation

Aircraft	Retired	Payload	Passengers	Notes
Bombardier CRJ200SF	1	6,700 kg	—	First in Europe (Sold)
Aircraft Industries L-410 UVP-E	8	—	19	One bought by Filair
Antonov 26B	1	—	33	
Airbus A320	1	—	180	Has been sold in 2021
Total	11			
