= Yembe-Moke Airport =

- IATA: none; ICAO: FZEM

Summary
- Airport type: Public
- Serves: Bikoro
- Location: Yembe-Moke
- Elevation AMSL: 2,221 ft / 677 m
- Coordinates: 4°40′58.79″S 18°13′1.196″E

Map
- Location of airport in Democratic Republic of the Congo

Runways
Direction	Length		Surface
Direction	m	ft	Surface
10/28	825	2,707	Grass

Yembe-Moke Airport (ICAO: FZEM) was an airstrip serving Bikoro, a town at the western coast of Lake Tumba in Équateur Province, Democratic Republic of the Congo. The runway was 11 kilometres (6.8 mi) north-east of Bikoro. As of 2022, the area around former runway is part of newly created farmland.

The airport is 192 km (119 mi) north-east of N'djili International Airport in Kinshasa. There are currently no scheduled airline services operating from Yembe-Moke.

== See also ==
- Transport in the Democratic Republic of the Congo
- List of airports in the Democratic Republic of the Congo
