= Center of gravity of an aircraft =

Point over which the aircraft would balance

The center of gravity (CG) of an aircraft is the point over which the aircraft would balance. Its position is calculated after supporting the aircraft on at least two sets of weighing scales or load cells and noting the weight shown on each set of scales or load cells. The center of gravity affects the stability of the aircraft. To ensure the aircraft is safe to fly, the center of gravity must fall within specified limits established by the aircraft manufacturer.

== Terminology ==
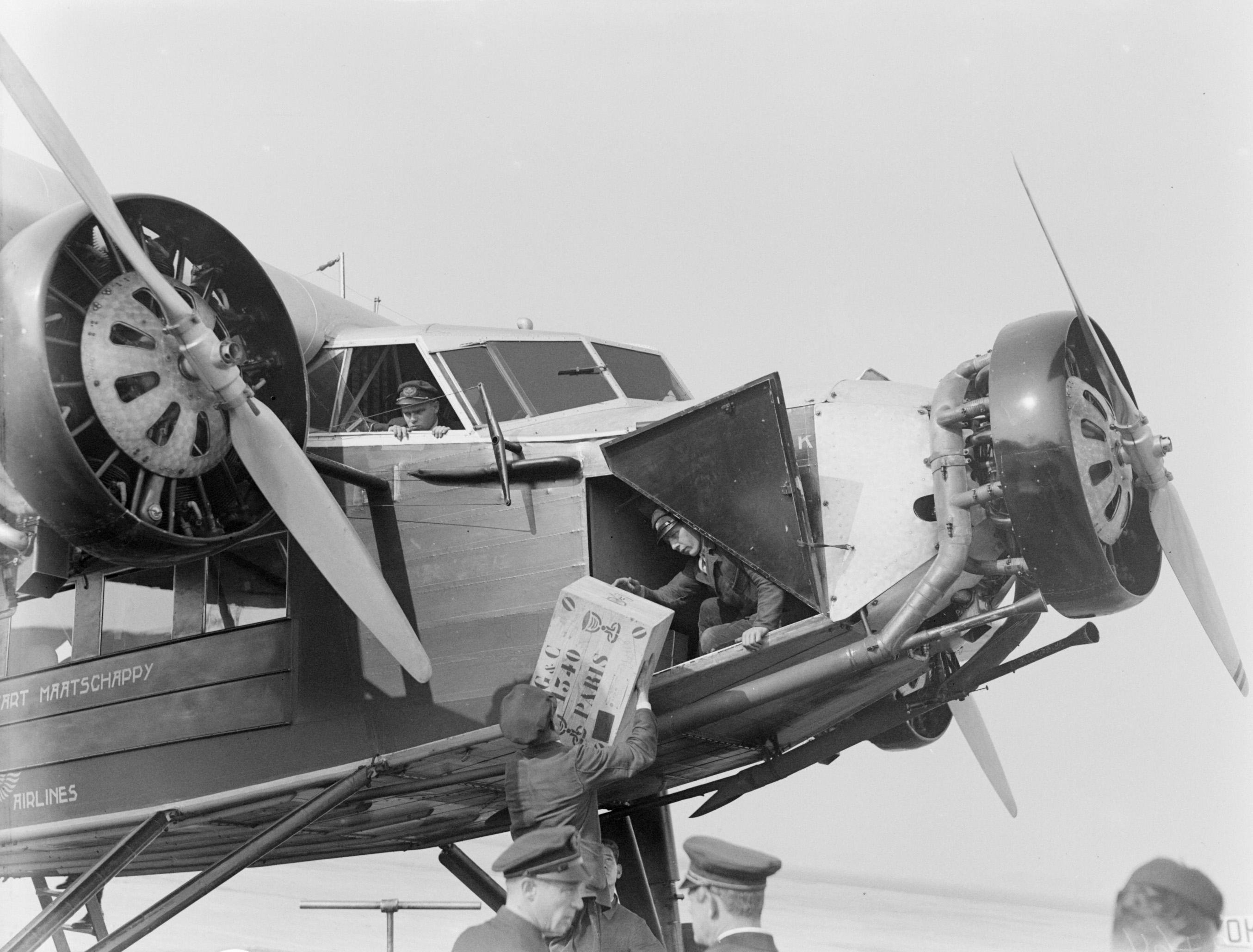
The nose baggage compartment of a Fokker F.XII in 1933, avoiding the problem of heavy weights towards the rear

Ballast
Ballast is removable or permanently installed weight in an aircraft used to bring the center of gravity into the allowable range.

Center-of-Gravity Limits
Center of gravity (CG) limits are specified longitudinal (forward and aft) and/or lateral (left and right) limits within which the aircraft's center of gravity must be located during flight. The CG limits are indicated in the airplane flight manual. The area between the limits is called the CG range of the aircraft.

Weight and Balance
When the weight of the aircraft is at or below the allowable limit(s) for its configuration (parked, ground movement, take-off, landing, etc.) and its center of gravity is within the allowable range, and both will remain so for the duration of the flight, the aircraft is said to be within weight and balance. Different maximum weights may be defined for different situations; for example, large aircraft may have maximum landing weights that are lower than maximum take-off weights (because some weight is expected to be lost as fuel is burned during the flight). The center of gravity may change over the duration of the flight as the aircraft's weight changes due to fuel burn or by passengers moving forward or aft in the cabin.

Reference Datum
The reference datum is a reference plane that allows accurate, and uniform, measurements to any point on the aircraft. The location of the reference datum is established by the manufacturer and is defined in the aircraft flight manual. The horizontal reference datum is an imaginary vertical plane or point, placed along the longitudinal axis of the aircraft, from which all horizontal distances are measured for weight and balance purposes. There is no fixed rule for its location, and it may be located forward of the nose of the aircraft. For helicopters, it may be located at the rotor mast, the nose of the helicopter, or even at a point in space ahead of the helicopter. While the horizontal reference datum can be anywhere the manufacturer chooses, most small training helicopters have the horizontal reference datum 100 inches forward of the main rotor shaft centerline. This is to keep all the computed values positive. The lateral reference datum is usually located at the center of the helicopter.

Arm
The arm is the horizontal distance from the reference datum to the center of gravity (CG) of an item. The algebraic sign is plus (+) if measured aft of the datum or to the right side of the center line when considering a lateral calculation. The algebraic sign is minus (−) if measured forward of the datum or the left side of the center line when considering a lateral calculation.

Moment
The moment is the moment of force, or torque, that results from an object's weight acting through an arc that is centered on the zero point of the reference datum distance. Moment is also referred to as the tendency of an object to rotate or pivot about a point (the zero point of the datum, in this case). The further an object is from this point, the greater the force it exerts. Moment is calculated by multiplying the weight of an object by its arm.

Mean Aerodynamic Chord (MAC)
A specific chord line of a tapered wing. At the mean aerodynamic chord, the center of pressure has the same aerodynamic force, position, and area as it does on the rest of the wing. The MAC represents the width of an equivalent rectangular wing in given conditions. On some aircraft, the center of gravity is expressed as a percentage of the length of the MAC. In order to make such a calculation, the position of the leading edge of the MAC must be known ahead of time. This position is defined as a distance from the reference datum and is found in the aircraft's flight manual and also on the aircraft's type certificate data sheet. If a general MAC is not given but a LeMAC (leading edge mean aerodynamic chord) and a TeMAC (trailing edge mean aerodynamic chord) are given (both of which would be referenced as an arm measured out from the datum line) then your MAC can be found by finding the difference between your LeMAC and your TeMAC.

== Calculation ==
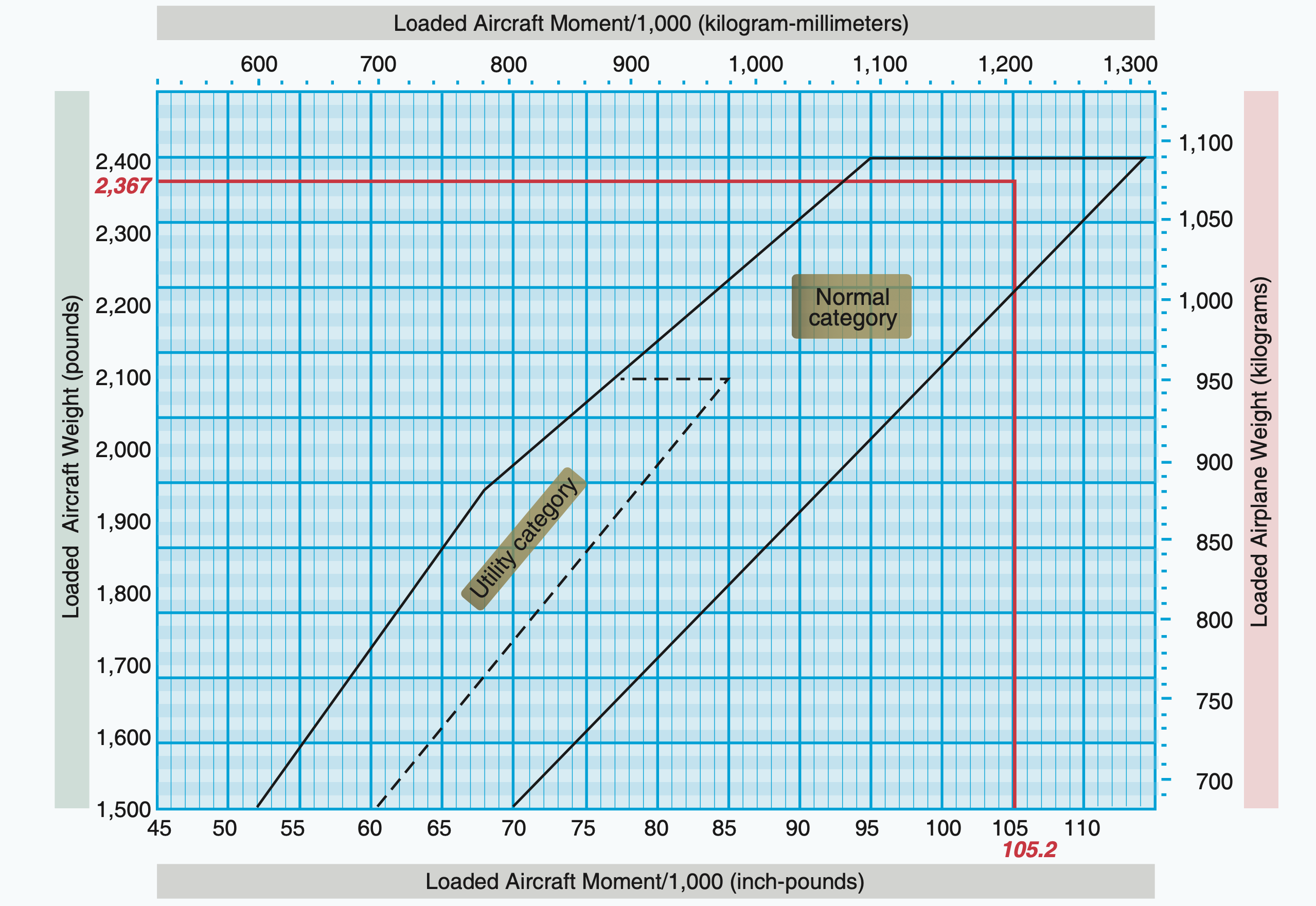
A sample CG-moment envelope chart, showing that a loaded plane weighing 2,367 lb (1,074 kg) with a moment of 105,200 lb⋅in (11886 N⋅m) is within the "normal category" envelope.

Center of gravity (CG) is calculated as follows:

- Determine weights and arms for all mass within the aircraft.
- Multiply weights by arms for all mass to calculate moments.
- Add all moments together.
- Add all weights together.
- Divide total moment by total weight to give overall arm.

The arm that results from this calculation must be within the center of gravity limits dictated by the aircraft manufacturer. If it is not, weight in the aircraft must be removed, added (rarely), or redistributed until the center of gravity falls within the prescribed limits.

Aircraft center of gravity calculations are only performed along a single axis from the zero point of the reference datum that represents the longitudinal axis of the aircraft (to calculate fore-to-aft balance). Some helicopter types utilize lateral CG limits as well as longitudinal limits. Operation of such helicopters requires calculating CG along two axes: one calculation for longitudinal CG (fore-to-aft balance) and another calculation for lateral CG (left-to-right balance).

The weight, arm, and moment values of the fixed items on the aircraft (i.e. engines, wings, electronic components) do not change and are provided by the manufacturer on the aircraft equipment list. The manufacturer also provides information facilitating the calculation of moments for fuel loads. Removable weight items (i.e. crew members, passengers, baggage) must be properly accounted for in the weight and CG calculation by the aircraft operator.

=== Example ===
	Weight (lb)	Arm (in)	Moment (lb-in)
Empty aircraft	1,495.0	101.4	151,593.0
Pilot and passengers	380.0	64.0	24,320.0
Fuel (30 gallons @ 6 lb/gal)	180.0	96.0	17,280.0
Totals	2,055.0	94.0	193,193.0

To find the center of gravity, we divide the total moment by the total weight: 193,193 / 2,055 = 94.01 inches behind the datum plane.

In larger aircraft, weight and balance is often expressed as a percentage of mean aerodynamic chord, or MAC. For example, assume the leading edge of the MAC is 62 inches aft of the datum. Therefore, the CG calculated above lies 32 inches aft of the leading edge of the MAC. If the MAC is 80 inches in length, the percentage of MAC is 32 / 80 = 40%. If the allowable limits were 15% to 35%, the aircraft would not be properly loaded.

== Incorrect weight and balance in fixed-wing aircraft ==
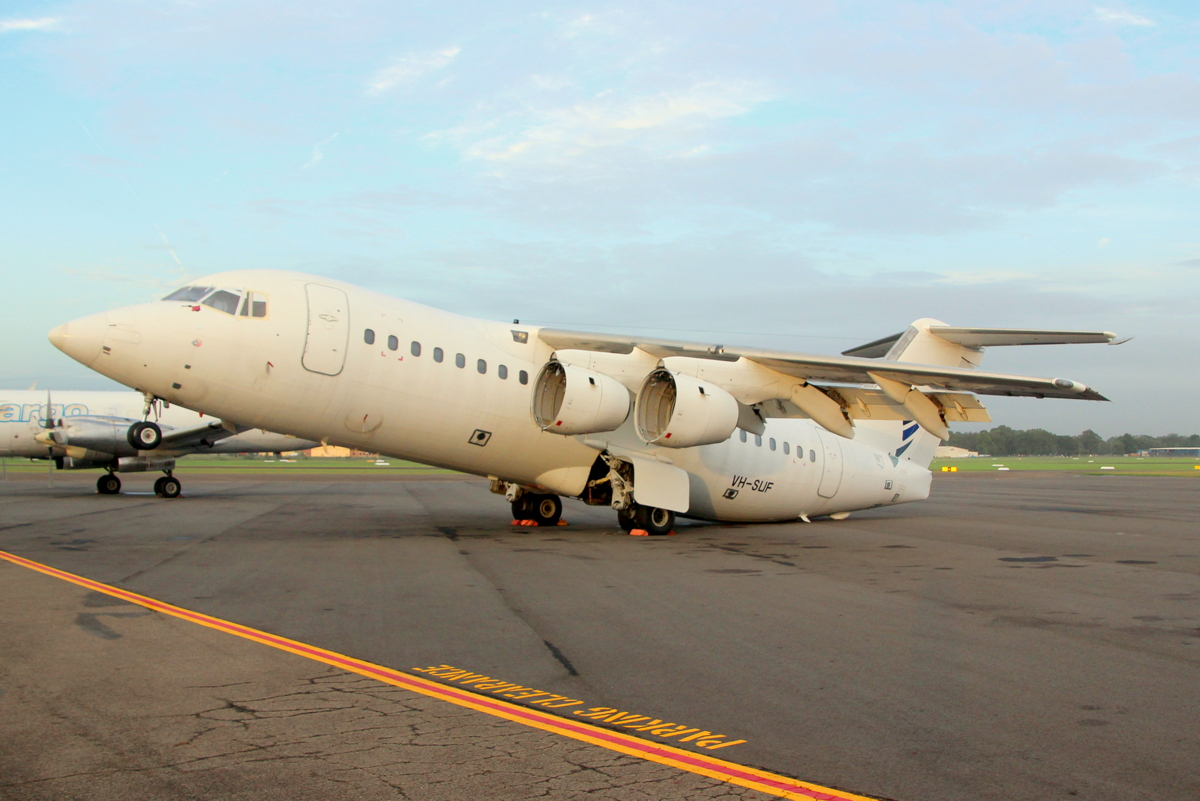
The center of gravity of this British Aerospace 146 shifted rearward when its engines were removed. As a result, it tipped back onto its rear fuselage in windy conditions.

When the weight or center of gravity of an aircraft is outside the acceptable range, the aircraft may not be able to sustain flight, or it may be impossible to maintain the aircraft in level flight in some or all circumstances, in some events resulting in load shifting. Placing the CG or weight of an aircraft outside the allowed range can lead to an unavoidable crash of the aircraft.

=== Center of gravity out of range ===
When the fore-aft center of gravity (CG) is out of range, serious aircraft control problems can occur. The fore-aft CG affects the longitudinal stability of the aircraft, with the stability increasing as the CG moves forward and decreasing as the CG moves aft. With a forward CG position, although the stability of the aircraft increases, the elevator control authority is reduced in the capability of raising the nose of the aircraft. This can cause a serious condition during the landing flare when the nose cannot be raised sufficiently to slow the aircraft. An aft CG position can cause severe handling problems due to the reduced pitch stability and increased elevator control sensitivity, with potential loss of aircraft control. Because the burning of fuel gradually produces a loss of weight and possibly a shift in the CG, it is possible for an aircraft to take off with the CG within normal operating range, and yet later develop an imbalance that results in control problems. Calculations of CG must take this into account (often part of this is calculated in advance by the manufacturer and incorporated into CG limits).

=== Adjusting CG within limits ===
The amount a weight must be moved can be found by using the following formula

shift distance = (total weight * cg change) / weight shifted

Example:

1500 lb * 33.9 in = 50,850 moment (airplane)
100 lb * 84 in = 8,400 moment (baggage)
cg = 37 in = (50,850 + 8,400) / 1600 lb (1/2 in out of cg limit)

We want to move the CG 1 in using a 100 lb bag in the baggage compartment.

shift dist = (total weight * cg change) / weight shifted
16 in = (1600 lb * 1 in) / 100 lb

Reworking the problem with 100 lb moved 16 in forward to 68 in moves CG 1 in.

1500 lb * 33.9 in = 50,850 moment (airplane)
100 lb * 68in = 6,800 moment (baggage)
cg = 36 in = (50,850 + 6,800) / 1600 lb
new cg = 36 in

=== Weight out of range ===
Few aircraft impose a minimum weight for flight (although a minimum pilot weight is often specified), but all impose a maximum weight. If the maximum weight is exceeded, the aircraft may not be able to achieve or sustain controlled flight. Excessive take-off weight may make it impossible to take off within available runway lengths, or it may completely prevent take-off. Excessive weight in flight may make climbing beyond a certain altitude difficult or impossible, or it may make it impossible to maintain an altitude.

== Incorrect weight and balance in helicopters ==
The center of gravity is even more critical for helicopters than it is for fixed-wing aircraft (weight issues remain the same). As with fixed-wing aircraft, a helicopter may be properly loaded for takeoff, but near the end of a long flight when the fuel tanks are almost empty, the CG may have shifted enough for the helicopter to be out of balance laterally or longitudinally. For helicopters with a single main rotor, the CG is usually close to the main rotor mast. Improper balance of a helicopter's load can result in serious control problems. In addition to making a helicopter difficult to control, an out-of-balance loading condition also decreases maneuverability since cyclic control is less effective in the direction opposite to the CG location.

The pilot tries to perfectly balance a helicopter so that the fuselage remains horizontal in hovering flight, with no cyclic pitch control needed except for wind correction. Since the fuselage acts as a pendulum suspended from the rotor, changing the center of gravity changes the angle at which the aircraft hangs from the rotor. When the center of gravity is directly under the rotor mast, the helicopter hangs horizontal; if the CG is too far forward of the mast, the helicopter hangs with its nose tilted down; if the CG is too far aft of the mast, the nose tilts up.

=== CG forward of forward limit ===
A forward CG may occur when a heavy pilot and passenger take off without baggage or proper ballast located aft of the rotor mast. This situation becomes worse if the fuel tanks are located aft of the rotor mast because as fuel burns the weight located aft of the rotor mast becomes less.

This condition is recognizable when coming to a hover following a vertical takeoff. The helicopter will have a nose-low attitude, and the pilot will need excessive rearward displacement of the cyclic control to maintain a hover in a no-wind condition. In this condition, the pilot could rapidly run out of rearward cyclic control as the helicopter consumes fuel. The pilot may also find it impossible to decelerate sufficiently to bring the helicopter to a stop. In the event of engine failure and the resulting autorotation, the pilot may not have enough cyclic control to flare properly for the landing.

A forward CG will not be as obvious when hovering into a strong wind, since less rearward cyclic displacement is required than when hovering with no wind. When determining whether a critical balance condition exists, it is essential to consider the wind velocity and its relation to the rearward displacement of the cyclic control.

=== CG aft of aft limit ===
Without proper ballast in the cockpit, exceeding the aft CG may occur when:

- A lightweight pilot takes off solo with a full load of fuel located aft of the rotor mast.
- A lightweight pilot takes off with maximum baggage allowed in a baggage compartment located aft of the rotor mast.
- A lightweight pilot takes off with a combination of baggage and substantial fuel where both are aft of the rotor mast.

An aft CG condition can be recognized by the pilot when coming to a hover following a vertical takeoff. The helicopter will have a tail-low attitude, and the pilot will need excessive forward displacement of cyclic control to maintain a hover in a no-wind condition. If there is a wind, the pilot needs even greater forward cyclic. If flight is continued in this condition, the pilot may find it impossible to fly in the upper allowable airspeed range due to inadequate forward cyclic authority to maintain a nose-low attitude. In addition, with an extreme aft CG, gusty or rough air could accelerate the helicopter to a speed faster than that produced with full forward cyclic control. In this case, dissymmetry of lift and blade flapping could cause the rotor disc to tilt aft. With full forward cyclic control already applied, the rotor disc might not be able to be lowered, resulting in possible loss of control, or the rotor blades striking the tail boom.

== Lateral balance ==
In fixed-wing aircraft, lateral balance is often much less critical than fore-aft balance, simply because most mass in the aircraft is located very close to its center. An exception is fuel, which may be loaded into the wings, but since fuel loads are usually symmetrical about the axis of the aircraft, lateral balance is not usually affected. The lateral center of gravity may become important if the fuel is not loaded evenly into tanks on both sides of the aircraft, or (in the case of small aircraft) when passengers are predominantly on one side of the aircraft (such as a pilot flying alone in a small aircraft). Small lateral deviations of CG that are within limits may cause an annoying roll tendency that pilots must compensate for, but they are not dangerous as long as the CG remains within limits for the duration of the flight.

For most helicopters, it is usually not necessary to determine the lateral CG for normal flight instruction and passenger flights. This is because helicopter cabins are relatively narrow and most optional equipment is located near the center line. However, some helicopter manuals specify the seat from which solo flight must be conducted. In addition, if there is an unusual situation, such as a heavy pilot and a full load of fuel on one side of the helicopter, which could affect the lateral CG, its position should be checked against the CG envelope. If carrying external loads in a position that requires large lateral cyclic control displacement to maintain level flight, fore and aft cyclic effectiveness could be dramatically limited.

== Fuel dumping and overweight operations ==
Many large transport-category aircraft are able to take-off at a greater weight than they can land. This is possible because the weight of fuel that the wings can support along their span in flight, or when parked or taxiing on the ground, is greater than they can tolerate during the stress of landing and touchdown, when the support is not distributed along the span of the wing.

Normally the portion of the aircraft's weight that exceeds the maximum landing weight (but falls within the maximum take-off weight) is entirely composed of fuel. As the aircraft flies, the fuel burns off, and by the time the aircraft is ready to land, it is below its maximum landing weight. However, if an aircraft must land early, sometimes the fuel that remains aboard still keeps the aircraft over the maximum landing weight. When this happens, the aircraft must either burn off the fuel (by flying in a holding pattern) or dump it (if the aircraft is equipped to do this) before landing to avoid damage to the aircraft. In an emergency, an aircraft may choose to land overweight, but this may damage it, and at the very least an overweight landing will mandate a thorough inspection to check for any damage.

In some cases, an aircraft may take off overweight deliberately. An example might be an aircraft being ferried over a very long distance with extra fuel aboard. An overweight take-off typically requires an exceptionally long runway. Overweight operations are not permitted with passengers aboard.

Many smaller aircraft have a maximum landing weight that is the same as the maximum take-off weight, in which case issues of overweight landing due to excess fuel being on board cannot arise.

== CG of large commercial transport aircraft ==
This section shows data obtained from a NASA Ames research grant for large commercial transport aircraft.

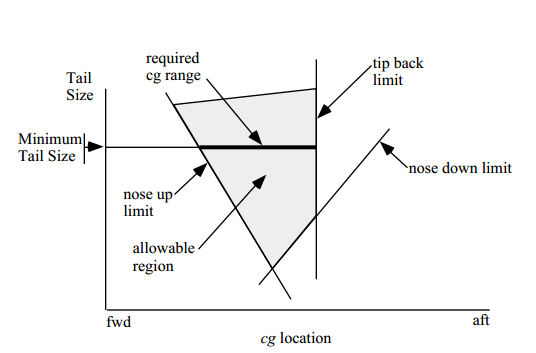
CG factors for transport aircraft

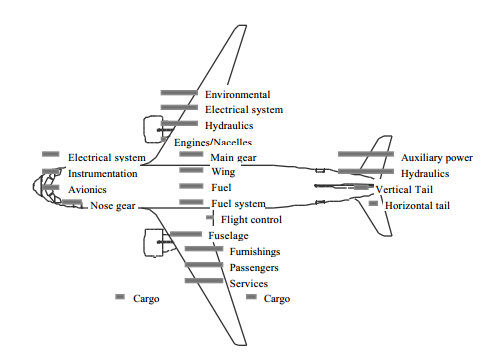
CG of components and systems

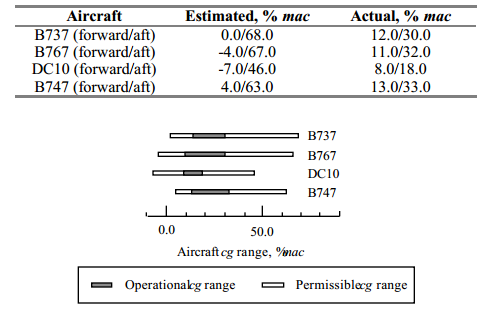
CG range of typical transport aircraft

The Operational CG Range is utilized during takeoff and landing phases of flight, and the Permissible CG Range is utilized during ground operations (i.e. while loading the aircraft with passengers, baggage and fuel).

== Accidents ==
- Air Midwest Flight 5481: in January 2003, a Beech 1900D was dispatched with more than 500 lb (230 kg) over its maximum weight, and mostly in the rear so its center of gravity was 5% aft. It crashed killing all 21 on board.
- In February 2005, a Challenger 600 departed Teterboro, New Jersey, loaded so far forward that it was out of the CG limit and it could not rotate, crashed through the airport fence into a building, severely injuring three occupants and destroying the aircraft.
- In August 2010, a Filair Let L-410 crashed in the Democratic Republic of Congo. The accident was reportedly the result of the occupants rushing to the front of the aircraft to escape from a crocodile smuggled on board by one of the passengers. The move compromised the aircraft's balance to the point that control of the aircraft was lost.
- In July 2013, a de Havilland Canada DHC-3 Otter departed Soldotna, Alaska, stalled after rotation and crashed 2,300 ft (700 m) away from its brake-release point as it was overloaded by 418 lb (190 kg) and its CG was well aft of the rear limit. All ten occupants died.

== See also ==
- Index of aviation articles
- Weight distribution
