= Donatien Bafuidinsoni Maloko-Mana =

Congolese Catholic prelate (born 1962)

The Most Reverend Donatien Bafuidinsoni Maloko-Mana
- Bishop of Inogo, Democratic Republic of the Congo
- Church: Catholic Church
- Archdiocese: Roman Catholic Archdiocese of Kinshasa
- See: Roman Catholic Diocese of Inongo
- Appointed: 31 March 2018
- Installed: 31 March 2018
- Predecessor: Philippe Nkiere Keana
- Successor: Incumbent
- Other post: Auxiliary Bishop of Kinshasa (31 March 2015 - 31 March 2018)

Orders
- Ordination: 18 July 1993
- Consecration: 7 June 2015 by Cardinal Laurent Monsengwo Pasinya
- Rank: Bishop

Personal details
- Born: Donatien Bafuidinsoni Maloko-Mana; 11 December 1962 (age 63) Kinshasa, Archdiocese of Kinshasa, Democratic Republic of the Congo

Styles of Donatien Bafuidinsoni Maloko-Mana
- Reference style: Your Lordship; The Most Reverend
- Spoken style: His Lordship
- Religious style: Bishop

Donatien Bafuidinsoni Maloko-Mana S.J. (born 11 December 1962) is a Congolese Catholic prelate who is the bishop of the Roman Catholic Diocese of Inongo in the Democratic Republic of the Congo since 31 March 2018. Before that, from 31 March 2015 until 31 March 2018, he was auxiliary bishop of the Catholic Archdiocese of Kinshasa. He was appointed bishop on 31 March 2015 by Pope Francis. He was consecrated and installed at Kinshasa on 7 June 2015. His episcopal motto is In omnibus amare et servire (In all things, to love and serve). On 31 March 2018, The Holy Father transferred him to the Diocese of Inongo, as the Local Ordinary. He is a member of the Society of Jesus.

== Background and education ==
He was born on 11 December 1962 in Kinshasa. He studied at the Novitiate of the Society of Jesus in Cyangugu, Rwanda starting on 29 September 1981. He studied philosophy at the Saint Peter Canisius Kimwenza Faculty, in Kinshasa from 1983 until 1986. He studied at the University of Lubumbashi from 1986 until 1988, graduating with a Diploma in Philosophy. He then studied Theology at the Jesuit Hekima Institute in Nairobi, Kenya from 1989 until 1992. From 1992 until 1999, he studied at the Pontifical Gregorian University, in Rome, Italy, where he graduated with a Doctorate in Canon Law. While writing his dissertation, he got a diploma from Scuola Vaticana di Biblioteconomia (Vatican School of Library Science).

== Priest ==
He joined the Society of Jesus in the 1980s while in seminary. He took his preliminary vows on 11 September 1983. He was ordained a priest of that Catholic religious Order on 18 July 1993. He took his perpetual vows on 24 March 2001, while a priest. He served as a priest until 31 March 2015.

While a priest, he served in various roles and locations including:

- Studies for a Doctorate in canon law at the Pontifical Gregorian University in Rome from 1993 until 1999.
- Delegate of the Provincial Father for the formation of the Jesuits in Africa from 1999 until 2001.
- Provincial for Central Africa from 2001 until 2008.
- Judicial Vicar of the Archdiocese of Kinshasa from 2009 until 2018.
- Consultant of the Community of the Jesuits from 2009 until 2012.
- Judicial Vicar of the Archdiocese of Kinshasa from 2012 until 2015.

== Bishop ==
On 31 March 2015, The Holy Father appointed him auxiliary bishop of the archdiocese of Kinshasa and concurrently, Titular Bishop of Gemellae in Byzacena. He was consecrated and installed at Kinshasa on 7 June 2015 by the hands of Cardinal Laurent Monsengwo Pasinya, Archbishop of Kinshasa, assisted by Archbishop Arthur Roche, Bishop Emeritus of Leeds, England and Bishop Philippe Nkiere Keana, Bishop of Inongo.

On 31 March 2018, following the age-related resignation of Bishop Philippe Nkiere Keana, Pope Francis appointed Bishop Donatien Bafuidinsoni Maloko-Mana, previously auxiliary bishop of Kinshasa as the local ordinary of the Catholic Diocese of Inongo in the Metropolitan Ecclesiastical Province of Kinshasa. He continues to serve as the diocesan bishop as of 2019.

== See also ==
- Catholic Church in the Democratic Republic of the Congo

== Succession table ==
Catholic Church titles
Preceded by	Auxiliary Bishop of Kinshasa (31 March 2015 - 31 March 2018)	Succeeded by
Preceded by Philippe Nkiere Keana (27 July 2005 - 31 March 2018)	Bishop of Inongo (since 31 March 2018)	Succeeded by (Incumbent)
