= Diocese of Inongo =

Roman Catholic diocese in the Democratic Republic of the Congo

Diocese of Inongo Dioecesis Inongoensis

Location
- Country: Democratic Republic of the Congo
- Metropolitan: Kinshasa

Statistics
- Area: 100,000 km^{2} (39,000 sq mi)
- Population: Total; Catholics: (as of 2006); 823,000; 407,000 (49.5%)

Information
- Rite: Latin Rite

Current leadership
- Pope: Leo XIV
- Bishop: Donatien Bafuidinsoni Maloko-Mana, S.J.

Website
- evecheinongo.blogspot.com

The Roman Catholic Diocese of Inongo (Latin: Inongoën(sis)) is a diocese located in the city of Inongo in the ecclesiastical province of Kinshasa in the Democratic Republic of the Congo.

== History ==
- 29 June 1953: Established as Apostolic Vicariate of Inongo from the Apostolic Vicariate of Léopoldville
- 10 November 1959: Promoted as Diocese of Inongo

== Bishops ==
- Vicar Apostolic of Inongo (Latin Rite)
  - Bishop Jan van Cauwelaert, C.I.C.M. (6 Jan 1954 – 10 November 1959 ); see below
- Bishops of Inongo (Latin Rite)
  - Jan van Cauwelaert, C.I.C.M. (10 Nov 1959 - 12 June 1967 ); see above
  - Léon Lesambo Ndamwize (12 Jun 1967 - 27 July 2005 )
  - Philippe Nkiere Keana, C.I.C.M. (27 Jul 2005 - 31 March 2018 )
  - Donatien Bafuidinsoni Maloko-Mana, S.J. (31 March 2018 - )

=== Auxiliary bishop ===
- Laurent Monsengwo Pasinya (1980–1981), appointed Auxiliary Bishop of Kisangani; future Cardinal

== See also ==
- Roman Catholicism in the Democratic Republic of the Congo

== Sources ==
- GCatholic.org
- Catholic Hierarchy
