= Mbenza Bedi =

Congolese footballer

Personal information
- Full name: Hugue Bedi Mbenza
- Date of birth: 11 September 1984 (age 42)
- Place of birth: Milange, Zaire
- Height: 1.79 m (5 ft 10 in)
- Position: Attacking midfielder

Senior career*
Years	Team	Apps	(Gls)
2006–2007	Bel'Or Kinshasa	11	(0)
2007–2011	TP Mazembe	17	(3)
2012–2013	Anderlecht	14	(0)
2013–2014	Club Africain	6	(0)
2014–2015	TP Mazembe	?	(?)
2015–2017	Renaissance	?	(?)
2017	TP Mazembe	?	(?)

International career
2009–2011	DR Congo	7	(2)
- * Club domestic league appearances and goals

Hugues Bedi Mbenza (born 11 September 1984, in Milange) is a Congolese footballer, who most recently played for TP Mazembe.

== Club career ==
The midfielder began his career with AC Dynamique and joined in 2006 to Bel'Or Kinshasa. After one and a half year signed on 1 January 2007 with TP Mazembe, who played in both the 2009 and 2010 FIFA Club World Cup.

On 17 December 2011, Bedi left Mazembe for Belgian powerhouse R.S.C. Anderlecht the player has not convinced the staff and the team could not wait for his late integration. On 14 January 2013, Bedi Mbenza signs a two years and half contract with a Tunisian club Club Africain.

== International career ==
He has represented the Congo DR national football team.
