= Bokoro Airport (Democratic Republic of the Congo) =

- IATA: none; ICAO: none

Summary
- Airport type: Public
- Serves: Bokoro
- Elevation AMSL: 1,080 ft / 329 m
- Coordinates: 2°53′05″S 18°21′10″E

Map
- Location of the airport in Democratic Republic of the Congo

Runways
Direction	Length		Surface
Direction	m	ft	Surface
11/29	1,110	3,640	Dirt
- Sources: Google Maps

Bokoro Airport is an airport serving the city of Bokoro in Mai-Ndombe Province, Democratic Republic of the Congo. The province of Mai-Ndombe is one of three regions the former province of Bandundu has been divided into.

== Trivia ==
Officially, Bokoro Airport does not have an ICAO-Code. However, the code FZBC is attributed to Bikoro Airport, allegedly serving the town of Bikoro. Bikoro never had an airport as various old maps and aeronautical charts confirm. It is instead served by the airfield of Yembe-Moke (FZEM) located 7 miles north-east of the town. Additionally, the third letter "B" in the code indicates that the airport is located the former province of Bandundu. Bikoro is located in the former province of Equateur. It is therefore assumed that FZBC is actually the ICAO code intended for Bokoro airport that has been wrongly assigned due to a spelling error.

== See also ==
- Transport in the Democratic Republic of the Congo
- List of airports in the Democratic Republic of the Congo
