= Bikoro Territory =

- Interactive map of Bikoro Territory
- Coordinates: 0°45′S 18°07′E
- Country: Democratic Republic of the Congo
- Province: Équateur Province

Area
  - Total: 13,274 km^{2} (5,125 sq mi)

Population (2020)
  - Total: 1,395,209
  - Density: 105.11/km^{2} (272.23/sq mi)
- Time zone: UTC+1 (WAT)

Bikoro Territory is an administrative area in Équateur District of Équateur province in the Democratic Republic of the Congo. The headquarters is the town of Bikoro. The territory lies to the south of the provincial capital of Mbandaka. It is bordered on the west by the Congo River, and contains Lake Ntomba.

The lake covers about 765 square kilometres (295 sq mi) depending on the season, connected via the Irebu channel with the Congo river. Water may flow into or out of the lake through this channel depending on the floods. Lake Tumba has 114 species of fish and supports an important fisheries. The lake lies at the center of the Tumba-Ngiri-Maindombe landscape, the largest Ramsar Convention wetland in the world, a vast area of forest and permanent or seasonal lakes and marshlands that has great environmental and economic value.

Bikoro Territory is one of the remaining places where bonobos still survive, a close relative of humans. It is also home to the endangered red colobus monkey and the red-tailed monkey. Other large animals include the hippopotamus, crocodile and elephant. The marsh forests are suffering from uncontrolled timber extraction and slash-and-burn agriculture. The main cash crops are coffee, cacao and rubber.
