= Tresor Abdullah =

Qatari footballer (born 1987)

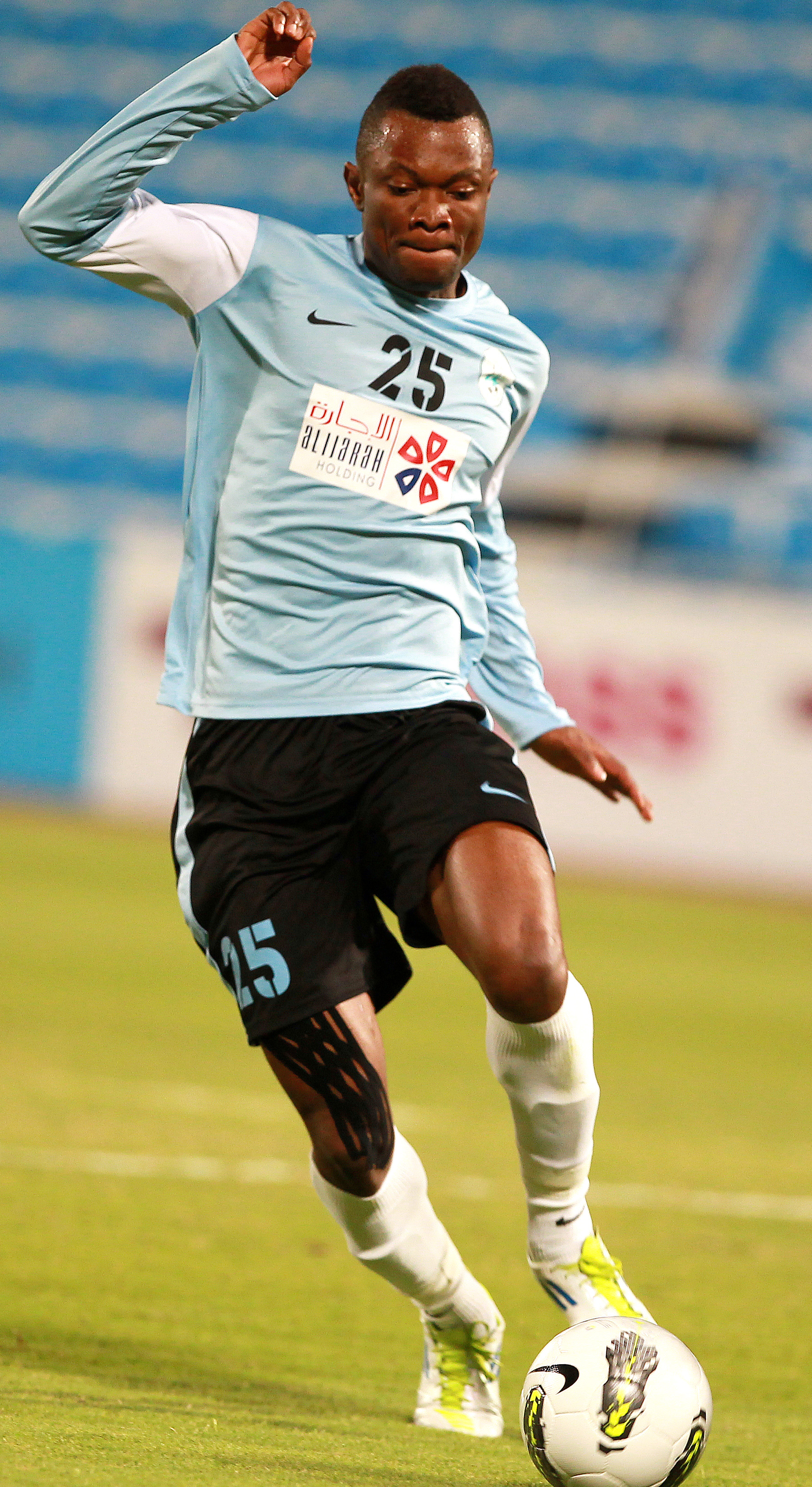

Personal information
- Full name: Mohammed Tresor Abdullah
- Birth name: Tresor Kangambu
- Date of birth: 8 April 1987 (age 39)
- Place of birth: Likasi, Zaire (now DR Congo)
- Height: 1.80 m (5 ft 11 in)
- Position: Winger

Senior career*
Years	Team	Apps	(Gls)
2007–2008	AS Aigle Rouge		
2008–2010	Al-Markhiya		
2010–2017	Lekhwiya	94	(0)
2011–2012	→ Al Wakrah (loan)	22	(2)
2017–2019	Al Ahli	26	(0)
2019–2020	Al-Markhiya		
2020–2021	Umm Salal	11	(0)

International career
2014–2016	Qatar	10	(0)
- * Club domestic league appearances and goals

Mohammed Tresor Abdullah (Arabic: محمد تريسور عبد الله, originally Tresor Kangambu, born 8 April 1987) is a footballer who currently plays as a winger. Born in Zaire, he represented the Qatar national team.

== Career ==
Tresor started his playing career in Al Markhiya in 2009, moved to Lekhwiya a year later and helped them win the 2010–11 Qatar Stars League. Shortly after, he was transferred to Al Wakrah. He made his debut on September 16 against his former club in a 1–0 loss.

== Personal life ==
Tresor converted to Islam on 17 December 2014 and adopted the name Mohammed Tresor Abdullah.
