= Filair =

Airline of the Democratic Republic of the Congo

- Founded: 1987
- Ceased operations: 2015
- Hubs: N'Dolo Airport
- Headquarters: Kinshasa, Democratic Republic of the Congo
- Key people: Danny Philemotte

Filair was an airline based in the Democratic Republic of the Congo. It operated from N'Dolo Airport in Kinshasa. The airline was on the list of air carriers banned in the European Union, as well as all airlines regulated by the authorities in the DRC.

The founder and owner of Filair was Danny Philemotte, a Belgian pilot, who died in an air crash involving one of the company's Let-L410 turboprops in 2010.

== Destinations ==
It operated regional flights to Boma, Idiofa, Kikwit, Matadi and Muanda, among others.

== Fleet ==
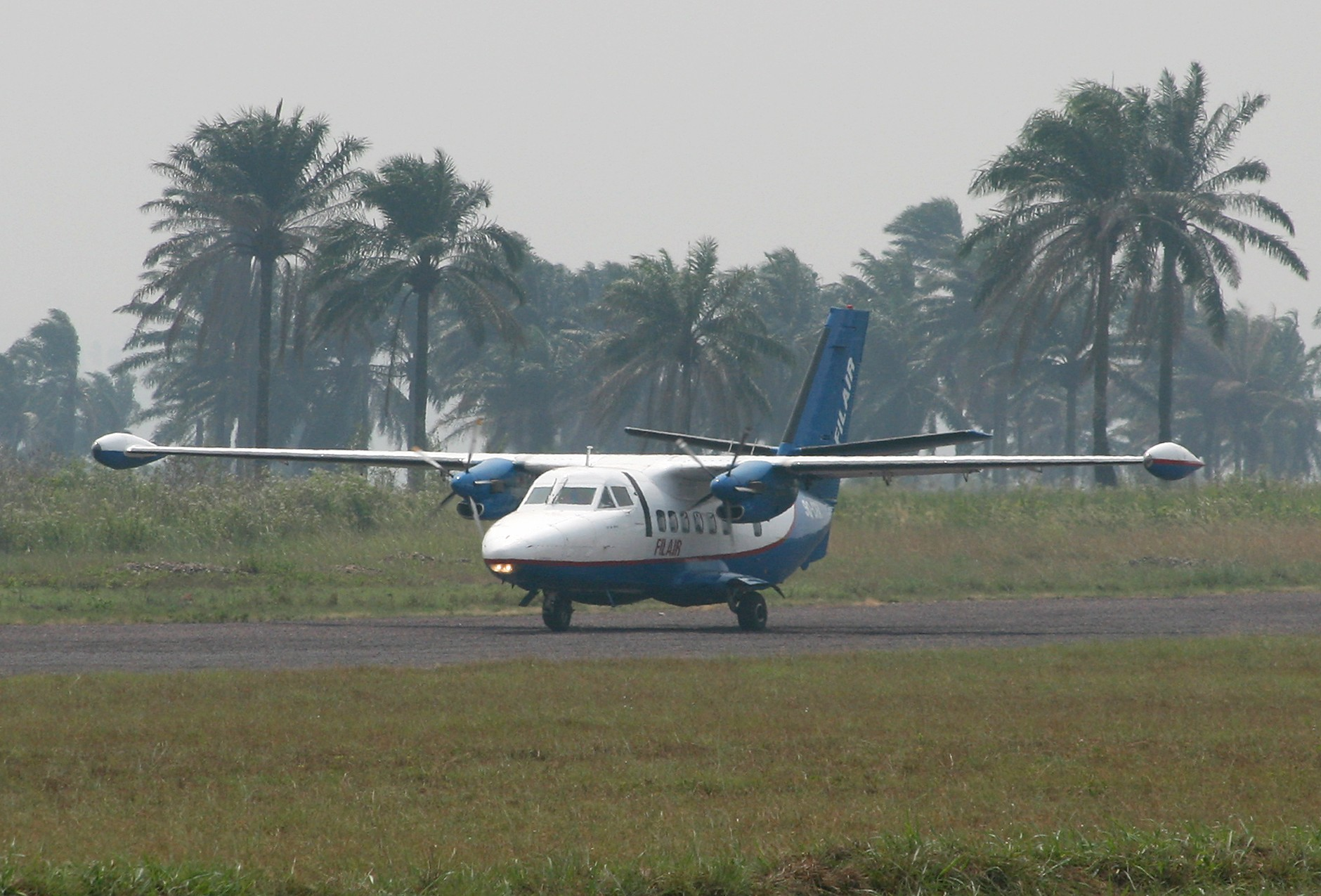
Let L-410 Turbolet 9Q-CDN at Kikwit Airport

- Antonov AN-24B
- Let L-410 UVP-E Turbolet
  1. 9Q-CCN (Destroyed on 25 August 2010)
  2. 9Q-CDN

=== Former fleet ===
- Douglas DC-6A
- Douglas DC-7C
- Lockheed L-188CF Electra
- Lockheed L-188PF Electra
- Vickers Viscount
- CV 580
- Boeing 707

== Accidents and incidents ==
- 9Q-CTS, a Vickers Viscount Type 757, was written off in 1988 while landing at Tshikapa Airport (TSH/FZUK).
- 9Q-CGD, a Lockheed L-188PF Electra, was written off in Angola in July 1994.
- 9Q-CCN, a Let L-410, crashed, 20 fatalities on 25 August 2010. See 2010 Filair Let L-410 crash. The cause of the crash was loss of control and balance of the aircraft.
