= FC Mwangaza =

- Full name: Football Club Mwangaza
- League: Linafoot Ligue 2 EUFBE

Football Club Mwangaza is a Congolese football club based in Beni, North Kivu province and currently playing in the Linafoot Ligue 2, the second level of the Congolese football.
