= AS Maïka =

- Full name: Association Sportive Maïka
- Ground: Stade de l’Unité/Uvira; Uvira, DR Congo
- Capacity: 15,000
- League: Linafoot Ligue 2

Association Sportive Maïka is a football club in Uvira, Democratic Republic of Congo. They play in the Linafoot Ligue 2, the second level of professional football in DR Congo.
