= US Panda B52 =

- Full name: US Panda B52 Likasi
- Nickname: Les Bombardiers
- Founded: 1952
- Ground: Stade de Kikula; Likasi, DR Congo
- Capacity: 5,000
- Chairman: Claude Mpunga
- Manager: Olivier Nyembwe
- League: Linafoot
- 2021-22: 11th, Linafoot

Union Sportive Panda B52 Likasi is a Congolese football club based in Likasi, Haut-Katanga province, currently playing in the Linafoot, the first level of the Congolese football, following their promotion from 2020–21 Linafoot Ligue 2. US Panda plays its home matches at the 5,000 Capacity Stade de Kikula in Likasi.
