= Roman Catholic Diocese of Bondo =

Roman Catholic diocese in the Democratic Republic of the Congo

Coordinates: 3.8173°N 23.6809°E

Diocese of Bondo Dioecesis Bondoensis

Location
- Country: Democratic Republic of the Congo
- Metropolitan: Kisangani

Statistics
- Area: 75,600 km^{2} (29,200 sq mi)
- Population: Total; Catholics: (as of 2006); 418,000; 136,007 (32.5%)

Information
- Rite: Latin Rite

Current leadership
- Pope: Leo XIV
- Bishop: Etienne Ung'eyowun Bediwegi

The Roman Catholic Diocese of Bondo (Latin: Bondoën(sis)) is a diocese located in the city of Bondo in the ecclesiastical province of Kisangani in the Democratic Republic of the Congo.

== History ==
- 10 March 1926: Established as Apostolic Prefecture of Bondo from Apostolic Vicariate of Western Uélé
- 2 December 1937: Promoted as Apostolic Vicariate of Bondo
- 10 November 1959: Promoted as Diocese of Bondo

== Bishops ==
=== Ordinaries, in reverse chronological order ===
- Bishops of Bondo (Latin Rite), below
  - Bishop Etienne Ung'eyowun Bediwegi (since 18 March 2008)
  - Bishop Philippe Nkiere Keana, C.I.C.M. (13 November 1992 – 27 July 2005)
  - Bishop Marcel Bam’ba Gongoa (28 January 1980 – 13 November 1992)
  - Bishop Emmanuel Marcel Mbikanye, O.P. (1 September 1970 – 20 September 1978)
  - Bishop André Creemers, O.S.Cr. (1959.11.10 – 1970.09.01); see below
- Vicars Apostolic of Bondo (Latin Rite), below
  - Bishop André Creemers, O.S.Cr. (1 January 1955 – 10 November 1959); see above
  - Bishop Frédéric Marie Blessing, O.S.Cr. (2 December 1937 – 1 January 1955); see below
- Prefect Apostolic of Bondo (Latin Rite), below
  - Father Frédéric Marie Blessing, O.S.Cr. (9 January 1930 – 2 December 1937); see above

=== Coadjutor bishop ===
- Philippe Nkiere Keana, C.I.C.M. (1991–1992)

== See also ==
- Roman Catholicism in the Democratic Republic of the Congo

== Sources ==
- GCatholic.org
- Catholic Hierarchy
