= Etoile de Kivu =

- Ground: Kadutu Concord Stadium; Bukavu, DR Congo
- Capacity: 10,000
- Chairman: Formose Mpiana
- Manager: Fabrice Tshipuka
- League: Linafoot
- 2025-26: 8th, Group B
Home colours	Away colours	Third colours

Etoile de Kivu is a Congolese football club based in Bukavu, South Kivu province and currently playing in the Linafoot, the first level of the Congolese football.
