= Jan van Cauwelaert =

Belgian-Congolese bishop

His Excellency, The Most Reverend Jan van Cauwelaert C.I.C.M.
- Bishop Inongo Diocese (Emeritus)
- Church: Roman Catholic Church
- See: Inongo Diocese
- In office: 1959–1967
- Predecessor: none
- Successor: Léon Lesambo Ndamwize
- Previous post: Priest

Orders
- Ordination: 6 August 1939
- Consecration: 25 March 1954 by Jozef Cardinal Van Roey

Personal details
- Born: 12 April 1914 Antwerp, Belgium
- Died: 18 August 2016 (aged 102) Jette, Belgium

Jan van Cauwelaert, C.I.C.M. (12 April 1914 – 18 August 2016) was a Belgian-Congolese bishop of the Roman Catholic Church. Upon his death at the age of 102, he was one of the oldest bishops in the Church, the oldest European-born bishop and the final living one to have been consecrated by Cardinal Jozef-Ernest van Roey.

Van Cauwelaert was born in Antwerp, Belgium in April 1914 as the youngest son of politician Frans Van Cauwelaert, and was ordained a priest on 6 August 1939 with the Congregation of the Immaculate Heart of Mary, a Roman Catholic religious institute. On 6 January 1954 he was appointed Apostolic Vicar of the Inongo Diocese in the Democratic Republic of the Congo and Titular Bishop of Metropolis in Asia. He was consecrated on 25 March 1954, and was appointed Bishop of Inongo Diocese on 10 November 1959. He resigned from the governance of that see on 12 June 1967 and was transferred to the titular see of Uccula. When the title of Bishop Emeritus came into use, he resigned on 12 October 1976 from his titular see, becoming Bishop Emeritus of Inongo.
