= AS Momekano =

- Full name: Association Sportive Momekano
- Ground: Stade 6 Mai; Bandundu, DR Congo
- Capacity: 2,000
- Manager: Delson Kabwende
- League: Linafoot Ligue 2

AS Momekano is a football club in Bandundu, Democratic Republic of Congo. They play in the Linafoot, the top level of professional football in DR Congo.

== Achievements ==
- Bandundu Provincial League: 1

2007
