= AS Mabela a Bana =

Football club in the Democratic Republic of Congo

AS Mabela a Bana is a football club in Mwene-Ditu, Democratic Republic of Congo. In the 2006/2007 season they played in the Linafoot, the top level of professional football in DR Congo.

== Achievements ==
- Kasaï-Oriental Provincial League: 1

2006
