= Bokoro, Democratic Republic of the Congo =

Bokoro
- Commune
- Location in Democratic Republic of the Congo
- Coordinates: 2°52′3.37″S 18°22′24.5″E
- Country: DR Congo
- Province: Mai-Ndombe
- Territory: Kutu
- Time zone: UTC+1 (WAT)
- Climate: Aw
- National language: Lingala

Bokoro is a community in Mai-Ndombe of the Democratic Republic of the Congo (DRC). It is on the south bank of the Lukenie River.

Bokoro Airport is just south of the town.
