= Lake Tumba =

Lake in the Democratic Republic of the Congo

Lake Ntomba
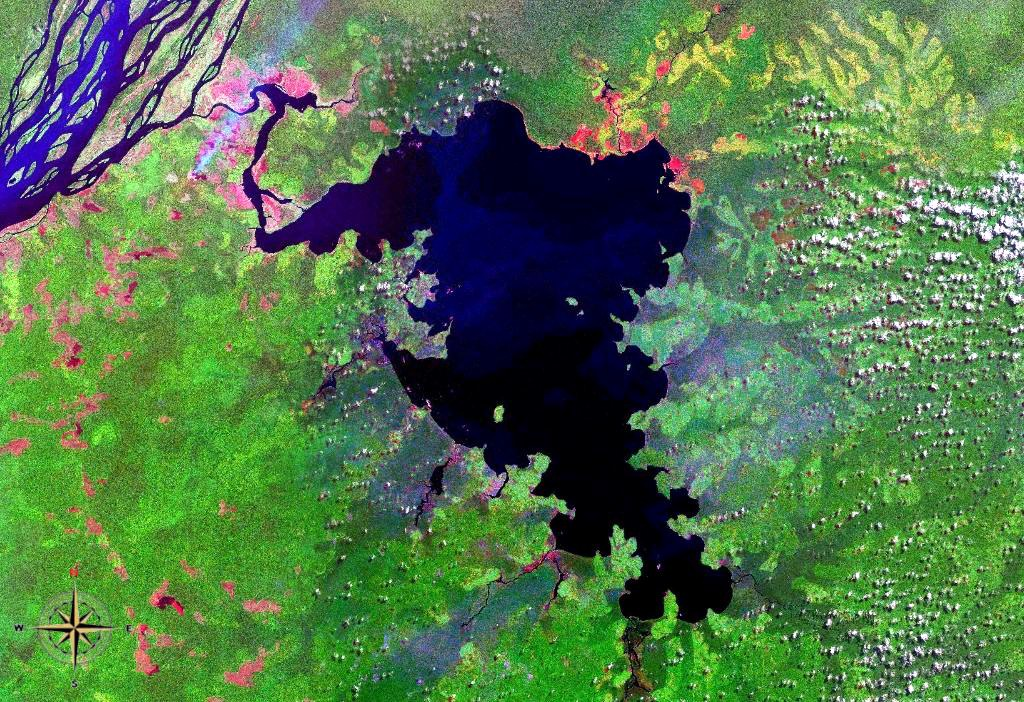
- Seen from space (false color)

- Location within Democratic Republic of the Congo Location within Africa
- Coordinates: 0°50′S 18°0′E
- Basin countries: Democratic Republic of the Congo
- Surface area: 500 km^{2} (193 sq mi)
- Max. depth: 6 m (20 ft)

Lake Ntomba, in red

Lake Ntomba (or Tumba) is a shallow lake in northwestern part of the Democratic Republic of the Congo, in the Bikoro Territory of the Province of Équateur. The naming Tumba comes from a mispronunciation of the name by non native.

The lake covers about 765 square kilometres (295 sq mi) depending on the season, connected via the Irebu channel with the Congo River. Water may flow into or out of the lake through this channel depending on the season and floods. Lake Ntomba has 114 species of fish and supports important fisheries. The lake lies at the center of the Ntomba-Ngiri-Maindombe area, designated a Wetland of International Importance by the Ramsar Convention in 2008.

Lake Ntomba was explored in 1883 by Henry Morton Stanley. The swamp forest surrounding the lake is inhabited by the Mongo people, who in this area are divided into two castes: the Oto, who farm, and the Twa, Pygmies who fish.
