= AS Kuya Sport =

- Founded: 1952
- Ground: Stade des Martyrs; Kinshasa, DR Congo
- Capacity: 80,000
- Chairman: (Democratic Republic of the Congo) Jeannot Binanu Mampasi
- Manager: (Democratic Republic of the Congo) Baptiste Kalenga
- League: Ligue 2
- 2024-25: Linafoot 10th in Group B (relegated)
Home colours	Away colours

AS Kuya Sport is a Congolese football club based in Kinshasa and currently playing in the Linafoot, the first level of the Congolese football.

== Coaches ==
- 2020 : (Chile) Diego Romano, ass. (Democratic Republic of the Congo) Lassa Nuni
