= AS Aigle Rouge =

AS Aigle Rouge is a football club in Isiro, Democratic Republic of Congo. They play in the Linafoot, the top level of professional football in DR Congo.
