= AC Dynamique =

AC Dynamique is a football club in Kindu, Democratic Republic of Congo.

== History ==
The club played 2008 in the Linafoot, the top level of professional football in DR Congo.

== Achievements ==
- Maniema Provincial League: 2

2002, 2003
