= Bandundu (city) =

- Provincial capital and city
- Ville de Bandundu
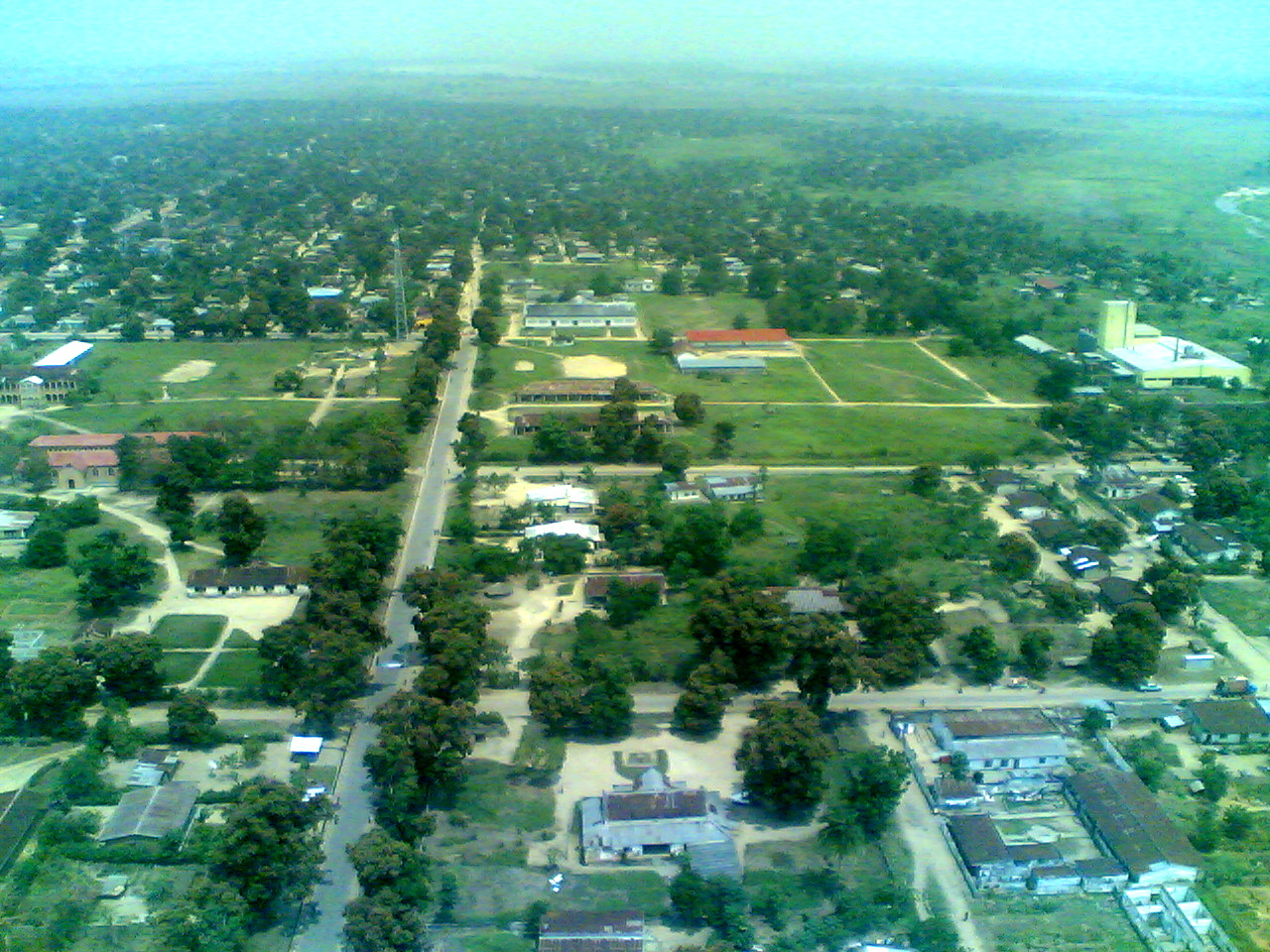
- View of city center from the air, 2007

- Location in Democratic Republic of the Congo
- Coordinates: 3°19′S 17°22′E
- Country: DR Congo
- Province: Kwilu
- City status: 1969
- Communes: Basoko, Disasi, Mayoyo

Government
  - Mayor: Moïse Monshengo

Area
  - Total: 222 km^{2} (86 sq mi)
- Elevation: 321 m (1,053 ft)

Population (2012)
  - Total: 143,435
  - Density: 646/km^{2} (1,670/sq mi)
- Time zone: UTC+1 (West Africa Time)
- Climate: Aw

Bandundu, formerly known as Banningville or Banningstad, is the capital city of Kwilu Province of the Democratic Republic of the Congo.

== Location ==
Bandundu is located on the east bank of the Kwango River, just north of the confluence of the Kwango and the Kwilu, and 8 kilometres (5.0 mi) south from the mouth of the Kwango on the Kasai River. It is around 260 kilometres (160 mi) from Kinshasa by air, or about 400 kilometres (250 mi) by road. In 2009, Bandundu had an estimated population of 133,080.

== Economy ==
Bandundu was once a significant river port, as it is the largest town on the river between Kinshasa and Kikwit. However, traffic on the Kasai and Kwango Rivers dropped dramatically as a result of the Second Congo War, and has yet to recover. Bandundu does have intermittent passenger and freight service to Kinshasa, Mushie and Kikwit. Since 2008, there is a car/truck ferry service running several times per day across the Kwango. An unpaved road, roughly 250 km long, runs from this point to the main (paved) highway between Kinshasa and Kikwit.

Bandundu is served by Bandundu Airport, with direct flights to Kinshasa.

Unlike many cities in the Congo, Bandundu has a fairly constant supply of electricity. However, this has nothing to do with Inga-Shaba HVDC line, as this line has no intermediate terminals.

== Climate ==
Under the Köppen climate classification, Bandundu has a tropical wet and dry climate (Aw).

Climate data for Bandundu
Month	Jan	Feb	Mar	Apr	May	Jun	Jul	Aug	Sep	Oct	Nov	Dec	Year
Record high °C (°F)	37.0 (98.6)	35.6 (96.1)	36.5 (97.7)	35.5 (95.9)	35.3 (95.5)	34.2 (93.6)	33.3 (91.9)	35.4 (95.7)	35.2 (95.4)	34.8 (94.6)	34.4 (93.9)	33.9 (93.0)	37.0 (98.6)
Mean daily maximum °C (°F)	30.6 (87.1)	31.1 (88.0)	31.4 (88.5)	31.4 (88.5)	31.3 (88.3)	30.6 (87.1)	29.5 (85.1)	30.7 (87.3)	31.0 (87.8)	31.0 (87.8)	30.5 (86.9)	30.3 (86.5)	30.8 (87.4)
Daily mean °C (°F)	26.2 (79.2)	26.5 (79.7)	26.6 (79.9)	26.7 (80.1)	26.7 (80.1)	25.6 (78.1)	24.5 (76.1)	25.5 (77.9)	26.1 (79.0)	26.3 (79.3)	26.0 (78.8)	26.1 (79.0)	26.1 (79.0)
Mean daily minimum °C (°F)	21.8 (71.2)	21.9 (71.4)	21.8 (71.2)	22.0 (71.6)	22.1 (71.8)	20.6 (69.1)	19.5 (67.1)	20.3 (68.5)	21.2 (70.2)	21.6 (70.9)	21.5 (70.7)	21.9 (71.4)	21.4 (70.5)
Record low °C (°F)	17.9 (64.2)	18.2 (64.8)	18.6 (65.5)	18.6 (65.5)	17.0 (62.6)	15.8 (60.4)	15.0 (59.0)	15.0 (59.0)	18.6 (65.5)	18.5 (65.3)	18.7 (65.7)	17.8 (64.0)	15.0 (59.0)
Average precipitation mm (inches)	144 (5.7)	149 (5.9)	169 (6.7)	171 (6.7)	100 (3.9)	23 (0.9)	6 (0.2)	22 (0.9)	107 (4.2)	213 (8.4)	246 (9.7)	192 (7.6)	1,542 (60.7)
Average precipitation days (≥ 0.1 mm)	7	9	6	8	6	2	1	2	8	8	10	9	75
Source: Deutscher Wetterdienst

== Sister cities ==
- Attert (Belgium)

== Gallery ==
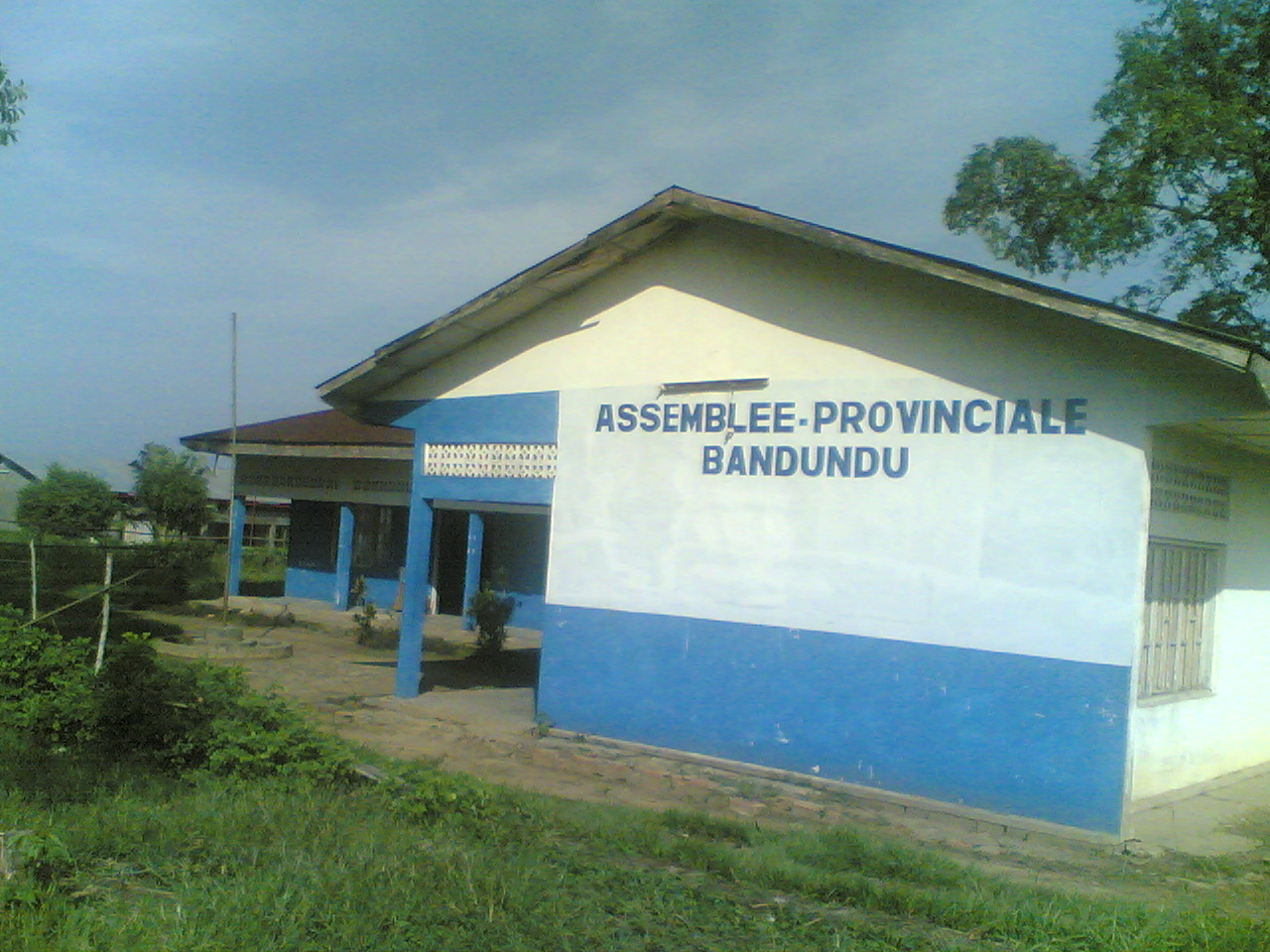
Seat of the Provincial Assembly

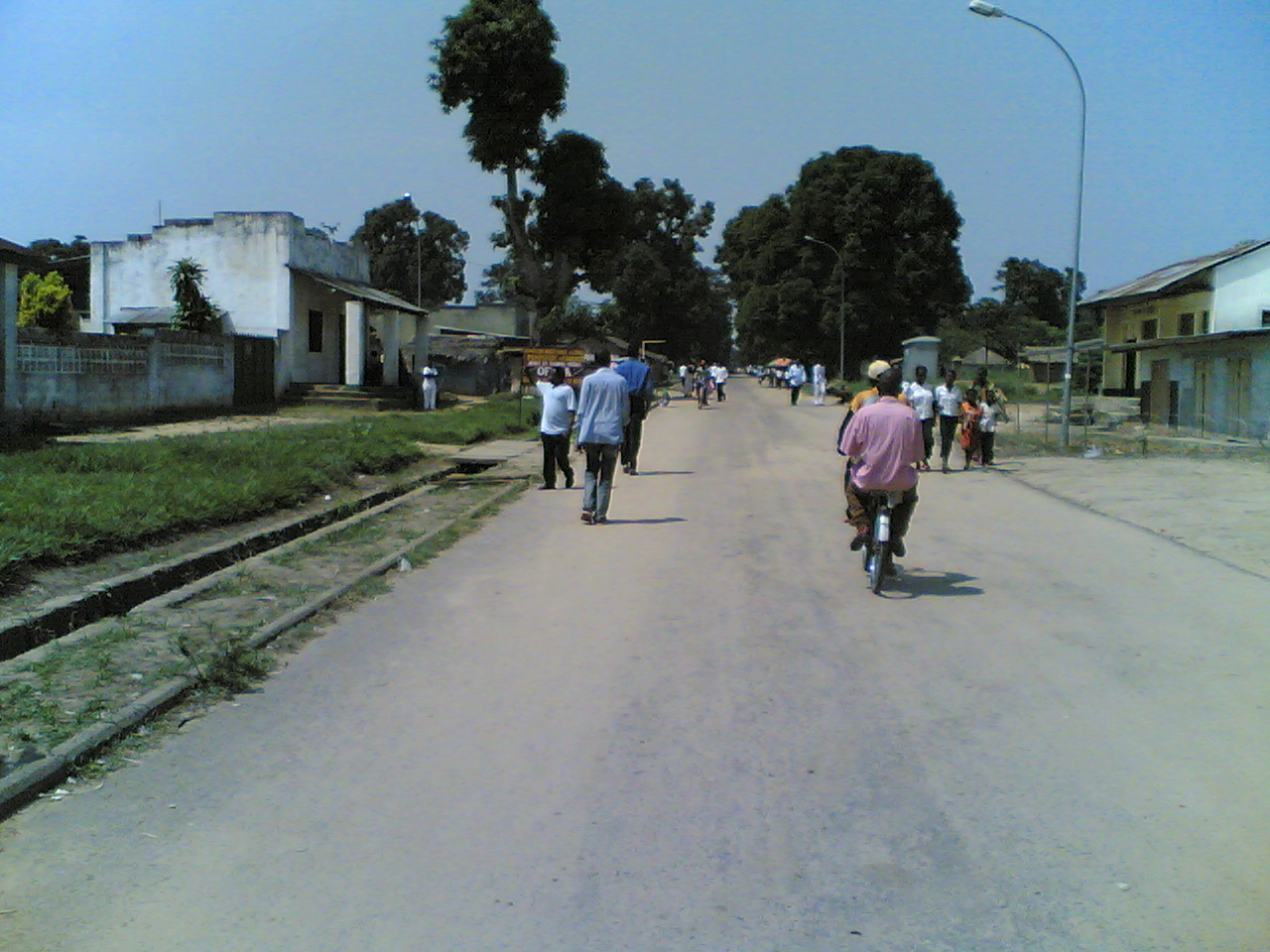
Road in the town center

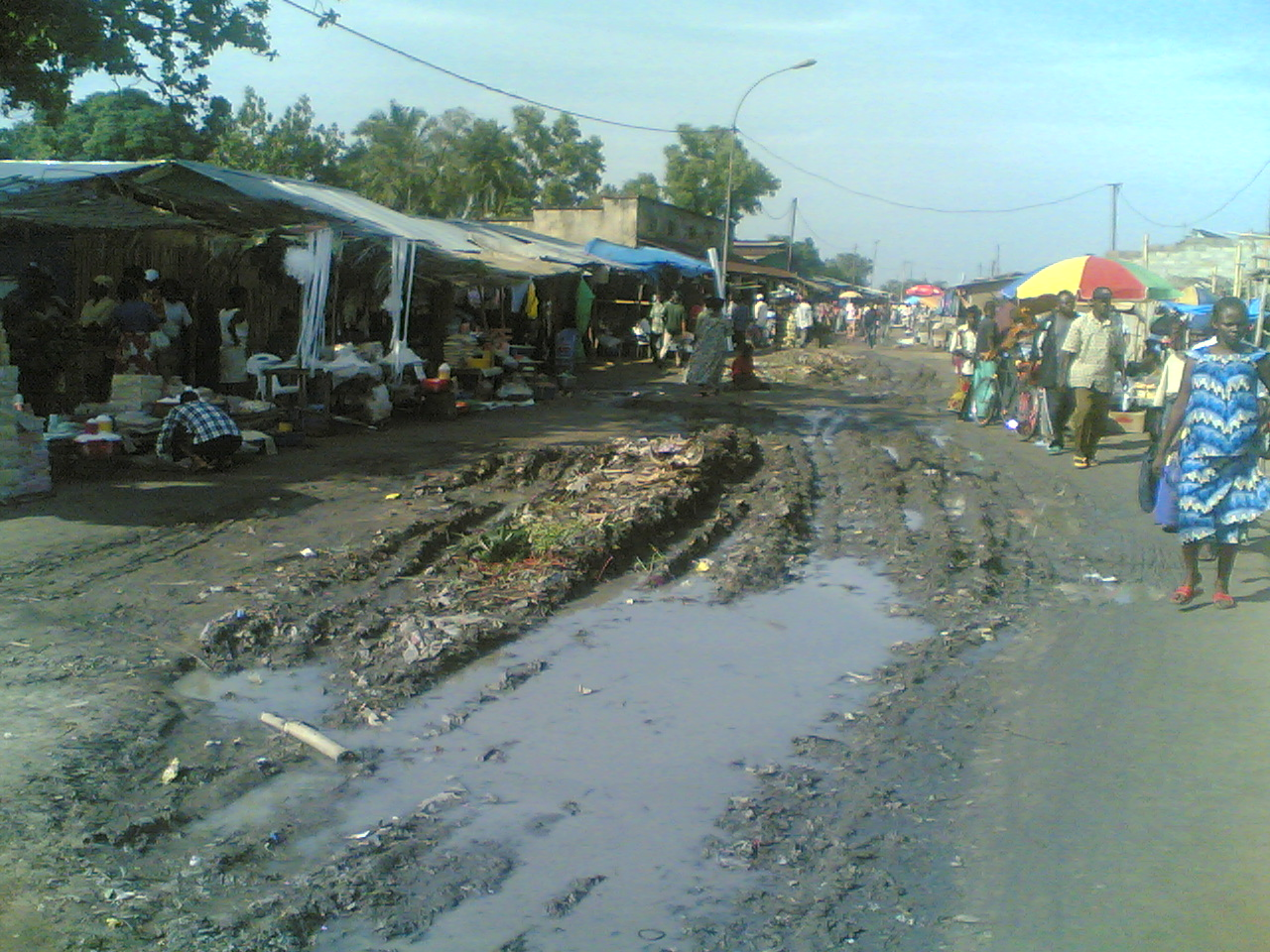
Market

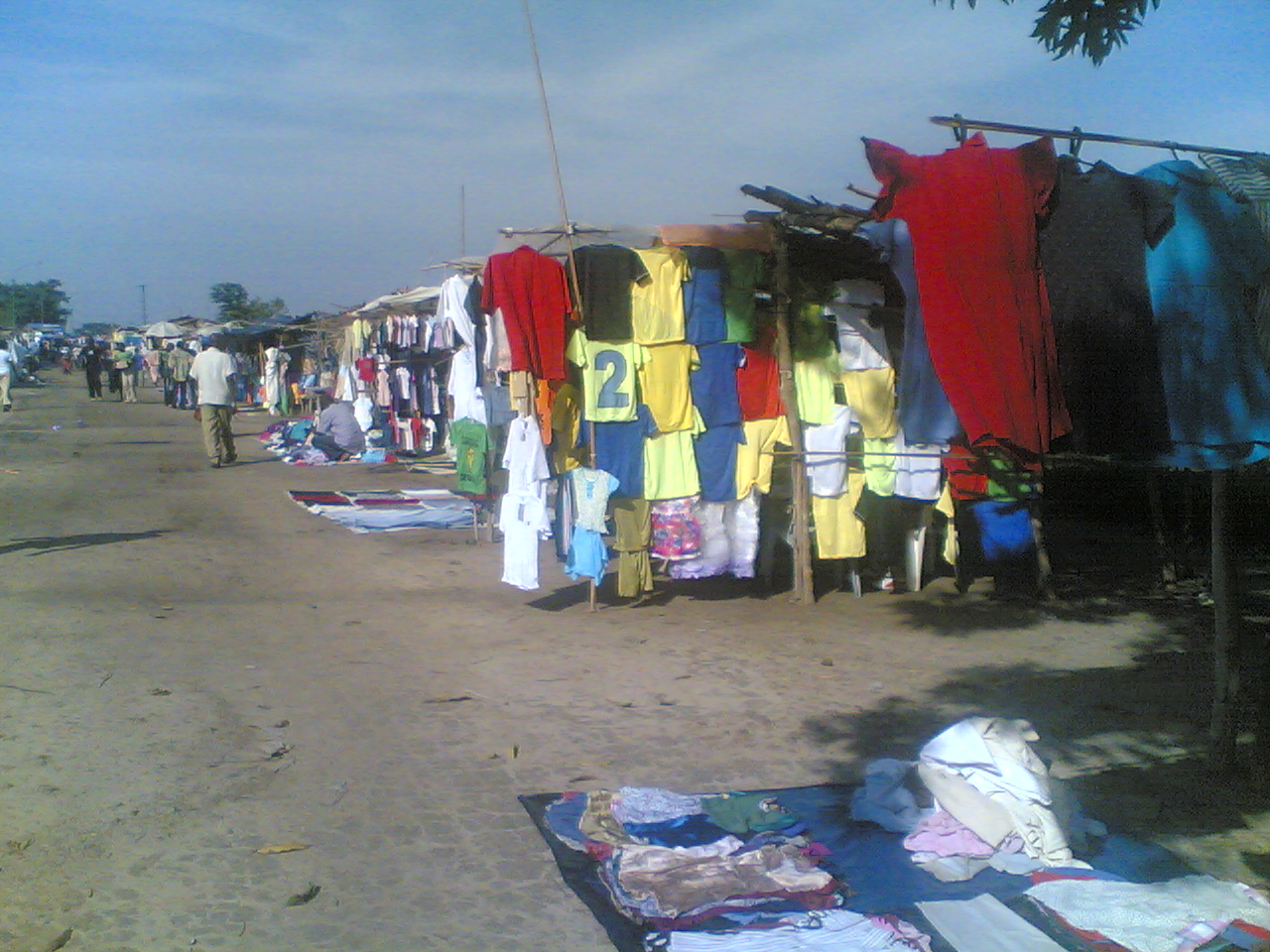
Clothing market

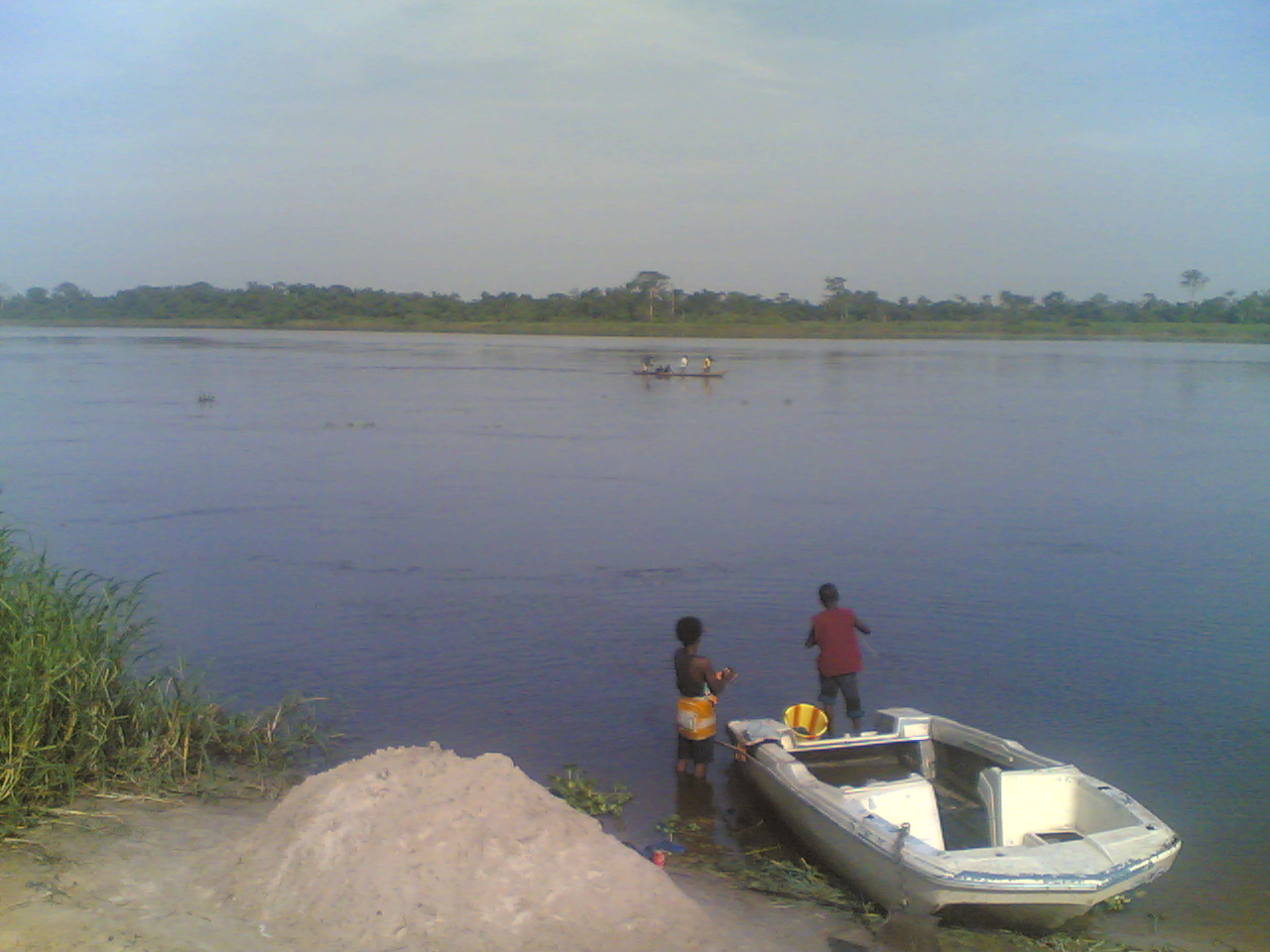
River Kwilu at Bandundu

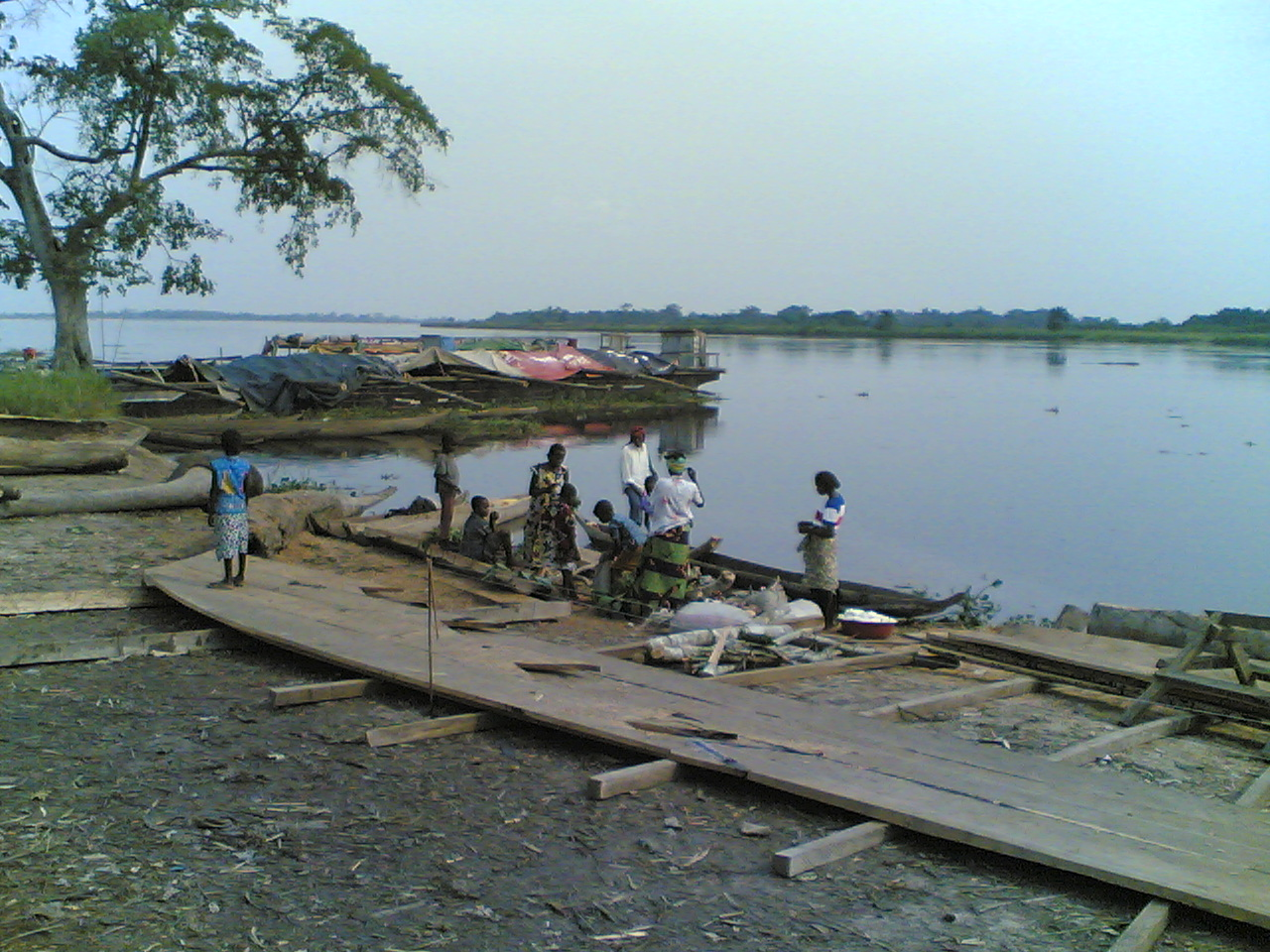
Beside the River Kwilu

== See also ==
- University of Bandundu
- AS Momekano
