= 2021–22 Akwa United F.C. season =

26th season in existence of Akwa United

Akwa United
2021–22 season
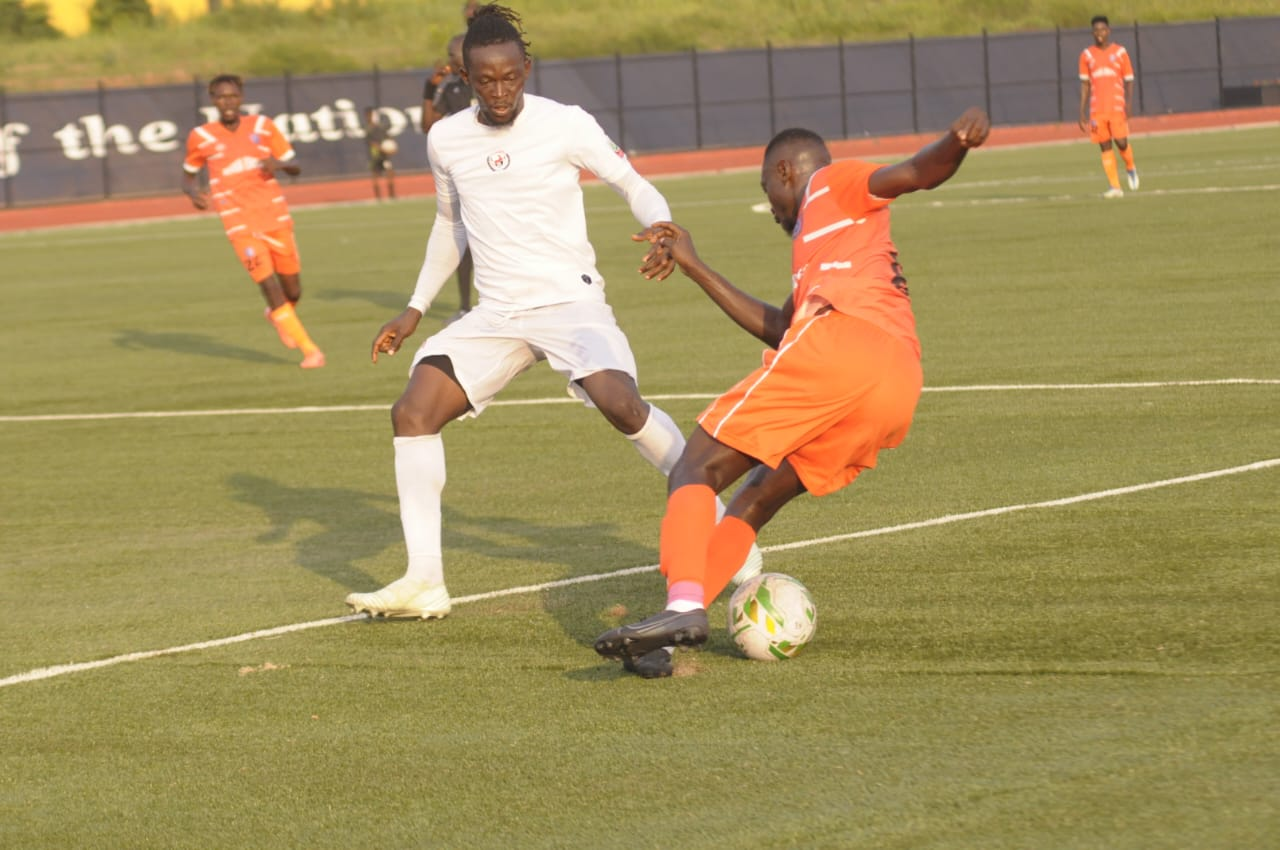
- Akwa United during their last league game of the 2021–22 season, against Enugu Rangers at Awka Township Stadium on 17 July 2022
- Chairman: Paul Bassey
- Manager: Kennedy Boboye (until 14 February 2022); Ayodeji Ayeni (from 24 March 2022)
- Nigeria Professional Football League: 9th
- Nigeria FA Cup: Round of 16
- CAF Champions League: First round
- Top goalscorer: League: Ubong Friday; Wisdom Fernando; Babatunde Bello (4 each); All: Ubong Friday (7)
- Biggest win: 6–1 (vs. Nasarawa United (H), 21 April 2022, NPFL)
- Biggest defeat: 4-1 (vs. Rivers United (A), 20 March 2022, NPFL); 3-0 (vs. Enugu Rangers (A), 13 March 2022, NPFL); 3-0 (vs. Plateau United (A), 27 February 2022, NPFL)
| Home colours | Away colours |

The 2021–22 season was Akwa United's 26th season in the Nigerian football league system and their 13th (non-consecutive) season in the top tier of Nigerian football.

During the season, Akwa United participated in the Nigeria Professional Football League for the ninth consecutive season and the CAF Champions League, where they were eliminated by CR Belouizdad in the first round.

They began their Nigeria Professional Football League campaign with a home tie against Kano Pillars, which they won 3-0.

== First-team squad ==
As of 18 July 2022

| Squad no. | Player | Nationality | Position(s) | Date of birth | Signed from | Apps | Goals | Assists |
Goalkeepers
| 1 | Adewale Adeyinka | (Nigeria) | GK | 14 December 1996 (age 29) | (Nigeria) Gombe United | 24 | 0 | 0 |
| 18 | Jean Efala | (Cameroon) | GK | 11 August 1992 (age 33) | (Cameroon) Coton Sport | 8 | 0 | 0 |
| 33 | Uche Okafor | (Nigeria) | GK | 23 November 1998 (age 27) | (Nigeria) Abia Warriors | 5 | 0 | 0 |
| 33 | Dele Ajiboye | (Nigeria) | GK | 7 August 1990 (age 35) | (Nigeria) Plateau United | 1 | 0 | 0 |
| 34 | Ifeanyi Emmanuel | (Nigeria) | GK | 4 August 2002 (age 23) | (Nigeria) One Touch FC | 1 | 0 | 0 |
Defenders
| 2 | James Ajako | (Nigeria) | LB | 9 March 2003 (age 23) | (Nigeria) Jigawa Golden Stars | 23 | 0 | 0 |
| 3 | Evans Ogbonda | (Nigeria) | LB | 3 November 2002 (age 23) | (Nigeria) Ifeanyi Ubah | 14 | 0 | 0 |
| 5 | Samson Gbadebo | (Nigeria) | CB | 19 October 1996 (age 29) | (Nigeria) Rivers United | 28 | 0 | 0 |
| 6 | Ekundayo Owoniyi | (Nigeria) | RB | 12 February 2001 (age 25) | (Nigeria) Cynosure F.C. | 6 | 0 | 0 |
| 6 | Charles Okafor | (Nigeria) | CB | 4 April 1999 (age 27) | (Nigeria) Ifeanyi Ubah | 12 | 1 | |
| 12 | Denis Nya | (Nigeria) | CB | 1 December 1996 (age 29) | (Nigeria) Plateau United | 16 | 0 | |
| 14 | Orji Kalu | (Nigeria) | CB | 9 February 1992 (age 34) | (Nigeria) Heartland | 3 | 0 | 0 |
| 14 | John Lazarus | (Nigeria) | RB | 6 June 1998 (age 27) | (Nigeria) Lobi Stars | 11 | 0 | |
| 15 | Elu Wilson | (Nigeria) | CB/RB | 8 December 1994 (age 31) | (Nigeria) Ifeanyi Ubah | 5 | 0 | 0 |
| 21 | David Philip | (Nigeria) | LB | 8 August 1994 (age 31) | (Nigeria) Go Round | 3 | 0 | 0 |
| 23 | Boluwaji Sholumade | (Nigeria) | CB | 27 March 2003 (age 23) | (Nigeria) Sunshine Stars | 10 | 0 | 0 |
| 29 | Etboy Akpan | (Nigeria) | RB | 11 November 1998 (age 27) | (Slovenia) NK Rudar Velenje U19 | 15 | 0 | |
| 32 | Christopher Nwaeze | (Nigeria) | CB | 16 November 2001 (age 24) | (Nigeria) Kwara United | 14 | 0 | |
Midfielders
| 4 | Solomon Okpako | (Nigeria) | DM | 1 May 1990 (age 36) | (Nigeria) Gulf Heroes | 5 | 0 | 0 |
| 9 | Adam Yakubu | (Nigeria) | CM | 1 February 2005 (age 21) | (Nigeria) Adamawa United | 23 | 3 | |
| 16 | James Arong | (Nigeria) | AM | 6 August 2003 (age 22) | (Cyprus) Türk Ocağı Limasol | 8 | 0 | 0 |
| 17 | Adeyeye Adeyemi | (Nigeria) | DM | 29 April 1988 (age 38) | (Nigeria) Sunshine Stars | 8 | 1 | 0 |
| 19 | Seth Mayi | (Nigeria) | AM | 18 December 1999 (age 26) | (Nigeria) | 29 | 0 | |
| 20 | Dare Ojo | (Nigeria) | DM | 10 December 1994 (age 31) | (Nigeria) Lobi Stars | 12 | 0 | 0 |
| 22 | Austin Osayande | (Nigeria) | CM/AM | 15 December 2000 (age 25) | (Nigeria) Dakkada | 16 | 1 | 0 |
| 26 | Obotu Young | (Nigeria) | AM | 13 April 1999 (age 27) | (Nigeria) | 2 | 0 | 0 |
| 27 | Ubong Essien | (Nigeria) | CM/DM | 17 December 2001 (age 24) | (Nigeria) Welcome Time Academy | 36 | 0 | 0 |
| 31 | Hamza Mubarak | (Nigeria) | CM | 15 June 2002 (age 23) | (Nigeria) Sokoto United | 4 | 0 | 0 |
| 35 | Babatunde Bello | (Nigeria) | CM | 11 May 2003 (age 23) | (Nigeria) Sunshine Stars | 16 | 4 | 1 |
| 38 | Kaham Platini | (Nigeria) | CM/AM | 15 October 1992 (age 33) | (Nigeria) Nasarawa United | 3 | 0 | |
Forwards
| 4 | Utibe Archibong | (Nigeria) | ST | 9 October 1991 (age 34) | (Nigeria) Abia Warriors | 11 | 1 | |
| 7 | Ubong Friday (captain) | (Nigeria) | LW/RW | 3 March 1998 (age 28) | (Nigeria) | 29 | 5 | |
| 8 | Ezekiel Bassey | (Nigeria) | LW/RW | 10 November 1996 (age 29) | (Egypt) El Qanah | 22 | 2 | |
| 10 | Orok Akarandut | (Nigeria) | LW/ST | 13 August 1987 (age 38) | (Bahrain) East Riffa Club | 8 | 0 | 0 |
| 11 | Leo Ezekiel | (Nigeria) | ST | 9 May 2003 (age 23) | (Nigeria) Blue Ocean FC | 15 | 3 | 0 |
| 17 | Naibe Akpesiri | (Nigeria) | ST/LW | 26 June 1997 (age 28) | (Nigeria) | 12 | 3 | 0 |
| 17 | Stephen Chukwude | (Nigeria) | ST/LW | 26 June 1997 (age 28) | (Nigeria) | 8 | 2 | 0 |
| 23 | Izu Azuka | (Nigeria) | ST/LW | 24 May 1989 (age 37) | (Ethiopia) Wolaitta Dicha | 4 | 0 | 0 |
| 24 | Samuel Amadi | (Nigeria) | RW | 10 March 2003 (age 23) | (Nigeria) Warri Wolves | 21 | 2 | |
| 28 | David Onovo | (Nigeria) | ST/LW | 25 December 1993 (age 32) | (Nigeria) Sokoto United | 19 | 2 | 0 |
| 36 | Godfrey Utim | (Nigeria) | ST | 25 December 2000 (age 25) | (Ghana) Inter Allies | 5 | 0 | 0 |
| 36 | Franklin Matib | (Nigeria) | ST | 2 March 2002 (age 24) | (Nigeria) | 9 | 1 | |

== Management team ==
| Position | Name |
|---|---|
| Manager | (Nigeria) Ayodeji Ayeni (from 24 March 2022) (Nigeria) Kennedy Boboye (until 14 February 2022) |
| Assistant coaches | (Nigeria) Ali Jolomi |
| Assistant coaches | (Nigeria) Ebenezer Atayero |
| Assistant coaches | (Nigeria) Edward Edemekong |
| Fitness coach | (Nigeria) Abdullahi Umar |
| Goalkeeper coach | (Nigeria) Moses Effiong |

== Competitions ==
Win Draw Loss

=== Overview ===
| Competition | First match | Last match | Starting round | Final position | Record | | | | | | | |
| Competition | First match | Last match | Starting round | Final position | Pld | W | D | L | GF | GA | GD | Win % |
|---|---|---|---|---|---|---|---|---|---|---|---|---|
| Nigeria Professional Football League | 19 December 2021 | 17 July 2022 | Matchday 1 | Ninth | 38 | 13 | 13 | 12 | 35 | 36 | −1 | 34.21 |
| CAF Champions League | 12 September 2021 | 19 September 2021 | First round | First round | 2 | 1 | 0 | 1 | 1 | 2 | −1 | 50.00 |
| Nigeria FA Cup | 30 July 2022 | 7 August 2022 | Round of 64 | Round of 16 | 3 | 2 | 0 | 1 | 7 | 2 | +5 | 66.67 |
| Total | | | | | 43 | 16 | 13 | 14 | 43 | 40 | +3 | 37.21 |

Source: Flashcore.com.ng

=== League table ===
| Pos | Team | Pld | W | D | L | GF | GA | GD | Pts | |
|---|---|---|---|---|---|---|---|---|---|---|
| 1 | Rivers United | 38 | 23 | 8 | 7 | 58 | 24 | +34 | 77 | Qualification for the Champions League |
| 2 | Plateau United | 38 | 21 | 4 | 13 | 50 | 29 | +21 | 67 | Qualification for the Champions League |
| 3 | Remo Stars | 38 | 18 | 8 | 12 | 43 | 26 | +17 | 62 | Qualification for the Confederation Cup |
| 4 | Kwara United | 38 | 17 | 7 | 14 | 43 | 45 | −2 | 58 | |
| 5 | Enugu Rangers | 38 | 15 | 11 | 12 | 41 | 30 | +11 | 56 | |
| 6 | Nasarawa United | 38 | 15 | 8 | 15 | 42 | 48 | −6 | 53 | |
| 7 | Enyimba | 38 | 15 | 7 | 16 | 39 | 36 | +3 | 52 | |
| 8 | Gombe United | 38 | 14 | 10 | 14 | 39 | 39 | 0 | 52 | |
| 9 | Akwa United | 38 | 13 | 13 | 12 | 35 | 36 | −1 | 52 | |
| 10 | Wikki Tourists | 38 | 15 | 7 | 16 | 34 | 35 | −1 | 52 | |
| 11 | Sunshine Stars | 38 | 14 | 9 | 15 | 30 | 30 | 0 | 51 | |
| 12 | Niger Tornadoes (Note: Niger Tornadoes initially had 2 points deducted by the LMC but were restored by the NFF.) | 38 | 15 | 6 | 17 | 32 | 38 | −6 | 51 | |
| 13 | Abia Warriors | 38 | 13 | 11 | 14 | 50 | 44 | +6 | 50 | |
| 14 | Dakkada | 38 | 15 | 4 | 19 | 42 | 49 | −7 | 49 | |
| 15 | Lobi Stars | 38 | 14 | 7 | 17 | 36 | 48 | −12 | 49 | |
| 16 | Shooting Stars | 38 | 12 | 12 | 14 | 41 | 45 | −4 | 48 | |
| 17 | Katsina United | 38 | 15 | 3 | 20 | 34 | 42 | −8 | 48 | Relegation to the NNL |
| 18 | Heartland | 38 | 13 | 8 | 17 | 32 | 48 | −16 | 47 | Relegation to the NNL |
| 19 | Kano Pillars (Note: Kano Pillars had 3 points deducted by the LMC and a further 3 points by the NFF.) | 38 | 15 | 6 | 17 | 32 | 36 | −4 | 45 | Relegation to the NNL |
| 20 | MFM | 38 | 9 | 9 | 20 | 26 | 51 | −25 | 36 | Relegation to the NNL |

Source: NPFL
Rules for classification: 1) points; 2) goal difference; 3) number of goals scored

==== Results summary ====
| Overall | | | | | | | | Home | | | | | | Away | | | | | |
| Pld | W | D | L | GF | GA | GD | Pts | W | D | L | GF | GA | GD | W | D | L | GF | GA | GD |
|---|---|---|---|---|---|---|---|---|---|---|---|---|---|---|---|---|---|---|---|
| 38 | 13 | 13 | 12 | 35 | 36 | −1 | 52 | 11 | 7 | 1 | 29 | 13 | +16 | 2 | 6 | 11 | 6 | 23 | −17 |

Last updated: 18 July 2022.
Source: Flashcore.com.ng

==== Matches ====
On 24 November 2021, the fixtures for the forthcoming season were announced.

| 19 December 2021 1 | Akwa United | 3–0 | Kano Pillars | Uyo |
| 15:00 BST | Bassey 45'; Stephen Chukwude 45'; Friday 90+3' | Report | | Stadium: Godswill Akpabio Stadium |

| 26 December 2021 2 | Shooting Stars | 1–1 | Akwa United | Ibadan |
| 15:00 BST | Ayo Adejubu 90+4' | Report | Utibe Archibong 29' | Stadium: Lekan Salami Stadium |

| 29 December 2021 3 | Akwa United | 1–0 | Gombe United | Uyo |
| 15:00 BST | Friday 79' (pen.) | Report | | Stadium: Godswill Akpabio Stadium |

| 2 January 2022 4 | Nasarawa United | 2–0 | Akwa United | Lafia |
| 15:00 BST | Michael Tochukwu 53'; Nwankwo 83' | Report | | Stadium: Lafia Township Stadium |

| 9 January 2022 5 | Lobi Stars | 1–0 | Akwa United | Makurdi |
| 16:00 BST | Saidu Mubarak 83' | Report | 40' | Stadium: Aper Aku Stadium |

| 15 January 2022 6 | Akwa United | 2–0 | Katsina United | Uyo |
| 15:00 BST | Charles Okafor 12'; Friday 47' | Report | | Stadium: Godswill Akpabio Stadium |

| 26 January 2022 7 | Enyimba | 1–0 | Akwa United | Aba |
| 15:00 BST | Omoyele 26' | Report | | Stadium: Enyimba Stadium |

| 23 January 2022 8 | Akwa United | 0–0 | Sunshine Stars | Uyo |
| 15:00 BST | | Report | | Stadium: Godswill Akpabio Stadium |

| 30 January 2022 9 | Niger Tornadoes | 0–1 | Akwa United | Abuja |
| 15:00 BST | Leo Ezekiel 68' | Report | | Stadium: National Stadium, Abuja |

| 2 February 2022 10 | Akwa United | 1–1 | Kwara United | Uyo |
| 15:00 BST | Stephen Chukwude 18' | Report | Samad Kadiri 69' | Stadium: Godswill Akpabio Stadium |

| 6 February 2022 11 | MFM | 0–0 | Akwa United | Lagos |
| 15:00 GMT | | Report | | Stadium: Teslim Balogun Stadium |

| 13 February 2022 12 | Akwa United | 0–0 | Heartland | Uyo |
| 15:00 GMT | | Report | | Stadium: Godswill Akpabio Stadium |

| 16 February 2022 13 | Remo Stars | 0–1 | Akwa United | Ikenne |
| 15:00 GMT | | Report | David Onovo 29' | Stadium: Remo Stars Stadium |

| 20 February 2022 14 | Akwa United | 3–2 | Dakkada | Uyo |
| 15:00 GMT | Samuel Amadi 29' (pen.); Wisdom Fernando 54'; Ezekiel Bassey 74' | Report | Oluwafemi Ajayi 18'; Edidiong Ezekiel 79' | Stadium: Godswill Akpabio Stadium |

| 27 February 2022 15 | Plateau United | 3–0 | Akwa United | Jos |
| 15:00 GMT | Silas Nenrot 6'; Ibrahim Buhari 62'; Izuchkwu Chimezie 90+3' | Report | | Stadium: New Jos Stadium |

| 2 March 2022 16 | Akwa United | 2–0 | Wikki Tourists | Uyo |
| 15:00 GMT | Adam Yakubu 49'; Leo Ezekiel 50' | Report | | Stadium: Godswill Akpabio Stadium |

| 6 March 2022 17 | Abia Warriors | 0–0 | Akwa United | Okigwe |
| 15:00 GMT | | Report | | Stadium: Okigwe Township Stadium |

| 13 March 2022 18 | Akwa United | 0–3 | Enugu Rangers | Uyo |
| 15:00 GMT | | Report | Samuel Pam 55'; Chidiebere Nwobodo 70'; Shedrack Asiegbu 90+2' | Stadium: Godswill Akpabio Stadium |

| 20 March 2022 19 | Rivers United | 4–1 | Akwa United | Port Harcourt |
| 15:00 GMT | Ishaq Rafiu 7' (pen.); Chijioke Akuneto 12', 28', 43' | Report | Austin Osayande 60' | Stadium: Adokiye Amiesimaka Stadium |

| 2 April 2022 20 | Akwa United | 1–1 | Rivers United | Uyo |
| 15:00 GMT | Adeyemi 47' | Report | Matthew Etim 17' (own goal) | Stadium: Godswill Akpabio Stadium |

| 6 April 2022 21 | Kano Pillars | 0–0 | Akwa United | Katsina |
| 15:00 GMT | | Report | | Stadium: Muhammadu Dikko Stadium |

| 11 April 2022 22 | Akwa United | 2–1 | Shooting Stars | Uyo |
| 15:00 GMT | Babatunde Bello 14'; Naibe Akpesiri 69' | Report | Ezeh Chidera 80' | Stadium: Godswill Akpabio Stadium |

| 16 April 2022 23 | Gombe United | 1–1 | Akwa United | Gombe |
| 15:00 GMT | Yusuf Abdulazeez 37' (pen.) | Report | Adam Yakubu 16' | Stadium: Pantami Stadium |

| 21 April 2022 24 | Akwa United | 6–1 | Nasarawa United | Uyo |
| 15:00 GMT | Friday 9'; Yakubu Adam 17'; Wisdom Fernando 22', 28'; Babatunde Bello 57'; Franklin Matib 79' | Report | Osanga 54' | Stadium: Godswill Akpabio Stadium |

| 24 April 2022 25 | Akwa United | 1–0 | Lobi Stars | Uyo |
| 15:00 GMT | Babatunde Bello 39' | Report | | Stadium: Godswill Akpabio Stadium |

| 1 May 2022 26 | Katsina United | 1–0 | Akwa United | Katsina |
| 15:00 GMT | Destiny Ashadi 57' | Report | | Stadium: Muhammadu Dikko Stadium |

| 8 May 2022 27 | Akwa United | 1–1 | Enyimba | Uyo |
| 15:00 GMT | Babatunde Bello 36' | Report | Victor Mbaoma 90+2' | Stadium: Godswill Akpabio Stadium |

| 15 May 2022 28 | Sunshine Stars | 0–0 | Akwa United | Akure |
| 15:00 GMT | | Report | | Stadium: Akure Township Stadium |

| 22 May 2022 29 | Akwa United | 1–0 | Akwa United | Uyo |
| 15:00 GMT | Matthew Etim 82' (pen.) | Report | | Stadium: Godswill Akpabio Stadium |

| 28 May 2022 30 | Kwara United | 1–0 | Akwa United | Ilorin |
| 15:00 GMT | Samad Kadiri 33' (pen.) | Report | | Stadium: Kwara State Stadium |

| 1 June 2022 31 | Akwa United | 0–0 | MFM | Uyo |
| 15:00 GMT | | Report | | Stadium: Godswill Akpabio Stadium |

| 5 June 2022 32 | Heartland | 1–0 | Akwa United | Owerri |
| 13:00 BST | Adeniji Adewale 47' | Report | | Stadium: Dan Anyiam Stadium |

| 12 June 2022 33 | Akwa United | 1–0 | Remo Stars | Uyo |
| 15:00 BST | Naibe Akpesiri 66' | Report | | Stadium: Godswill Akpabio Stadium |

| 19 June 2022 34 | Dakkada | 3–1 | Akwa United | Uyo |
| 15:00 BST | Etido Dan 42'; Aniekan Ekpe 54'; Edidiong Ezekiel 87' | Report | Samuel Amadi 39' | Stadium: Godswill Akpabio Stadium |

| 25 June 2022 35 | Akwa United | 2–1 | Plateau United | Uyo |
| 15:30 BST | David Onovo 12'; Leo Ezekiel 90+3' | Report | Jesse Akila 52' | Stadium: Godswill Akpabio Stadium |

| 3 July 2022 36 | Wikki Tourists | 2–0 | Akwa United | Bauchi |
| 15:00 BST | Taye Murtala 8'; Prince John 27' | Report | | Stadium: Abubakar Tafawa Balewa Stadium |

| 10 July 2022 37 | Akwa United | 2–2 | Abia Warriors | Uyo |
| 15:00 BST | Naibe Akpesiri 6'; Wisdom Fernando 32' | Report | Godwin Obaje 23'; Michael Ibe 77' | Stadium: Godswill Akpabio Stadium |

| 17 July 2022 38 | Enugu Rangers | 2–0 | Akwa United | Awka |
| 15:00 BST | Samuel Pam 16', 74' | Report | | Stadium: Awka Township Stadium |

=== Nigeria FA Cup ===
Akwa United secured a place in the Aiteo Cup after beating Sir Monty to reach the final of the Akwa Ibom State FA Cup.

They entered the competition in the round of 64, and were drawn against Essien Ayi.

| 30 July 2022 Round of 64 | Essien Ayi | 0–3 | Akwa United | Aba |
| 17:00 GMT | | Report | Friday 24'; Samuel Amadi 38'; Austin Osayande 62' | Stadium: Enyimba Stadium |

| 3 August 2022 Round of 32 | Remo Stars | 0–3 | Akwa United | Enugu |
| 17:00 GMT | | Report | Samuel Amadi 26', 67', 80' | Stadium: University of Nigeria, Enugu Campus |

| 7 August 2022 Round of 16 | Akwa United | 1–2 | Kogi United | Enugu |
| 17:00 GMT | Friday 67' (pen.) | Report | John Jerome 2'; Abdulwahid Jubril 85' | Stadium: University of Nigeria, Enugu Campus |
