= 2021–22 Nigeria Professional Football League =

Nigeria Professional Football League season

Nigeria Professional Football League
- Season: 2021–22
- Dates: 17 December 2021 – 22 July 2022
- Promoted: Niger Tornadoes; Shooting Stars; Remo Stars; Gombe United
- Relegated: MFM; Kano Pillars; Heartland; Katsina United
- CAF Champions League: Rivers United; Plateau United
- CAF Confederation Cup: Remo Stars; Kwara United
- Matches: 380
- Goals: 779 (2.05 per match)
- Top goalscorer: Chijioke Akuneto (19 goals)
- Biggest home win: Plateau United 5–0 Dakkada (16 January 2022); Akwa United 6–1 Nasarawa United (22 April 2022); Rivers United 5–0 MFM (8 May 2022)
- Biggest away win: Heartland 0–3 Enugu Rangers (21 January 2022); Akwa United 0–3 Enugu Rangers (13 March 2022)
- Highest scoring: Enugu Rangers 5–3 Lobi Stars (19 March 2022)
- Longest winning run: Plateau United (5 matches)
- Longest unbeaten run: Rivers United (12 matches)
- Longest winless run: Heartland & MFM (7 matches)
- Longest losing run: Heartland, MFM & Lobi Stars (5 matches)
- All statistics correct as of 17 July 2022.

The 2021–22 Nigeria Professional Football League was the 51st season of Nigeria's top-flight association football league and the 32nd since attaining professionalism. The season started on 17 December 2021 and was concluded on 17 July 2022.

This season saw Shooting Stars returning to the top-flight after a four-year hiatus, likewise Niger Tornadoes who won the National League play-offs. They were also joined by Remo Stars and Gombe United after securing promotion from the second division. Akwa United were the defending champions.

On 25 June 2022, Rivers United won their first league title with 4 matches to spare.

Kano Pillars were relegated for the first time in 20 years. This occurred as a result of the team suffering a six point deduction from the league committee and the club's poor form during the season, they were joined by MFM, Heartland and Katsina United. Remo Stars secured a continental ticket for the first time in the club's history.

== Teams information ==
Locations of the 2021–22 Nigeria Professional Football League teams

=== Clubs ===
- Note: Several clubs played home matches at other stadiums due to their regular stadia not meeting the league requirements or being banished by the LMC.

Team	Location	Stadium	Capacity	Head coach
Abia Warriors	Umuahia	Umuahia Township Stadium	5,000	Imama Amapakabo
Akwa United F.C.	Uyo	Godswill Akpabio International Stadium	30,000	Deji Ayeni
Dakkada	Uyo	Godswill Akpabio International Stadium	30,000	Danlami Kwasau
Enugu Rangers	Enugu	Ifeanyi Ubah FC Stadium; Awka City Stadium	18,000	Abdul Maikaba
Enyimba	Aba	Enyimba International Stadium	16,000	Finidi George
Gombe United	Gombe	Pantami Stadium	12,000	Aliyu Zubairu
Heartland F.C.	Owerri	Dan Anyiam Stadium	10,000	Erasmus Onuh
Kano Pillars	Kano	Sani Abacha Stadium	16,000	Salisu Yusuf
Katsina United	Katsina	Muhammad Dikko Stadium	35,000	Azeez Mohammed
Kwara United	Ilorin	Kwara State Stadium	18,000	Abdullahi Biffo
Lobi Stars	Makurdi	Aper Aku Stadium	20,000	Mohammed Babaganaru
MFM F.C.	Lagos	Teslim Balogun Stadium	24,325	Festus Allen
Nasarawa United	Lafia	Lafia Township Stadium	5,000	Bala Nikyu
Niger Tornadoes	Minna	Minna Township Stadium	5,000	Abubakar Bala
Plateau United	Jos	New Jos Stadium	60,000	Fidelis Ilechukwu
Remo Stars	Ikenne	Dipo Dina Stadium; Remo Stars Stadium	20,000	Gbenga Ogunbote
Rivers United	Port Harcourt	Yakubu Gowon Stadium	16,000	Stanley Eguma
Shooting Stars	Ibadan	Lekan Salami Stadium	10,000	Edith Agoye
Sunshine Stars	Akure	Dipo Dina Stadium; Akure Stadium	20,000	(Cameroon) Emmanuel Deutsch
Wikki Tourists F.C.	Bauchi	Abubakar Tafawa Balewa Stadium	15,000	Kabiru Dogo

=== Managerial changes ===
Not including interim management.

Team	Outgoing manager	Manner of departure	Date of departure	Incoming manager	Date of appointment
Heartland	(Nigeria) Hassan Abdallah	Resignation	2 February	(Nigeria) Erasmus Onuh	5 February
Akwa United	(Nigeria) Kennedy Boboye	Resignation	13 February	(Nigeria) Deji Ayeni	23 March
Lobi Stars	(Nigeria) Eddy Dombraye	Sacked	14 March	(Nigeria) Mohammed Babaganaru	24 March
Sunshine Stars	(Nigeria) Deji Ayeni	Left for Akwa United	23 March	(Cameroon) Emmanuel Deutsch	2 April
MFM	(Nigeria) Gabriel Olalekan	Sacked	11 May	(Nigeria) Festus Allen	11 May

== League table ==
Pos	Team	Pld	W	D	L	GF	GA	GD	Pts	
1	Rivers United	38	23	8	7	58	24	+34	77	Qualification for the Champions League
2	Plateau United	38	21	4	13	50	29	+21	67	Qualification for the Champions League
3	Remo Stars	38	18	8	12	43	26	+17	62	Qualification for the Confederation Cup
4	Kwara United (Note: Kwara United qualified for the Confederation Cup as the 2022 Aiteo Cup could not be completed.)	38	17	7	14	43	45	−2	58	Qualification for the Confederation Cup
5	Enugu Rangers	38	15	11	12	41	30	+11	56	
6	Nasarawa United	38	15	8	15	42	48	−6	53	
7	Enyimba	38	15	7	16	39	36	+3	52	
8	Gombe United	38	14	10	14	39	39	0	52	
9	Akwa United	38	13	13	12	35	36	−1	52	
10	Wikki Tourists	38	15	7	16	34	35	−1	52	
11	Sunshine Stars	38	14	9	15	30	30	0	51	
12	Niger Tornadoes (Note: Niger Tornadoes initially had 2 points deducted by the LMC but were restored by the NFF.)	38	15	6	17	32	38	−6	51	
13	Abia Warriors	38	13	11	14	50	44	+6	50	
14	Dakkada	38	15	4	19	42	49	−7	49	
15	Lobi Stars	38	14	7	17	36	48	−12	49	
16	Shooting Stars	38	12	12	14	41	45	−4	48	
17	Katsina United	38	15	3	20	34	42	−8	48	Relegation to the National League
18	Heartland	38	13	8	17	32	48	−16	47	Relegation to the National League
19	Kano Pillars (Note: Kano Pillars had 3 points deducted by the LMC and a further 3 points by the NFF.)	38	15	6	17	32	36	−4	45	Relegation to the National League
20	MFM	38	9	9	20	26	51	−25	36	Relegation to the National League

Source: NPFL
Rules for classification: 1) points; 2) goal difference; 3) number of goals scored

== Results ==
Home \ Away	ABI	AKW	DAK	ENU	ENY	GOM	HEA	KAN	KAT	KWA	LOB	MFM	NAS	NIG	PLA	REM	RIV	3SC	SUN	WIK
Abia Warriors		0–0	1–1	2–0	2–1	3–2	1–0	3–2	2–2	1–1	3–0	2–1	1–1	1–1	2–0	2–0	1–1	2–1	1–0	3–0
Akwa United	2–2		3–2	0–3	1–1	1–0	0–0	3–0	2–0	1–1	1–0	0–0	6–1	1–0	2–1	1–0	1–1	2–1	0–0	2–0
Dakkada	2–1	3–1		0–0	2–0	0–1	2–1	1–0	2–0	2–0	2–1	2–0	2–1	2–1	1–0	1–1	2–3	2–0	3–0	0–1
Enugu Rangers	2–1	2–0	1–0		0–1	1–0	3–1	0–0	1–0	3–0	5–3	2–0	1–0	4–0	0–1	0–0	0–0	2–2	0–0	2–1
Enyimba	2–1	1–0	0–2	2–1		3–0	0–0	4–0	2–1	3–0	2–1	1–1	3–2	1–1	1–1	2–1	0–1	1–0	2–0	2–0
Gombe United	1–0	1–1	2–2	1–0	0–0		3–2	1–0	1–0	4–2	3–0	3–0	3–1	1–0	1–1	1–0	0–0	0–0	1–0	2–1
Heartland	2–1	1–0	1–0	0–3	1–0	1–1		0–1	1–0	1–0	1–0	0–0	3–3	1–0	1–0	0–0	2–0	3–1	1–0	1–0
Kano Pillars	2–1	0–0	1–0	1–0	2–0	3–1	3–1		1–0	2–1	0–0	1–0	2–0	1–0	0–1	0–0	0–1	2–1	1–0	1–1
Katsina United	2–1	1–0	4–1	1–2	1–0	2–1	1–1	1–0		1–0	0–0	2–1	1–0	2–0	2–0	3–2	0–1	3–1	1–0	1–0
Kwara United	1–1	1–0	3–0	1–1	1–0	2–0	2–1	1–0	2–0		1–0	3–0	3–0	1–0	1–1	2–1	2–1	3–1	1–0	1–0
Lobi Stars	1–2	1–0	1–0	2–0	1–0	2–1	2–1	0–0	2–1	3–1		2–1	2–1	1–1	0–2	1–0	1–1	2–1	0–0	3–2
MFM	2–1	0–0	2–0	0–0	2–1	3–1	1–0	2–1	1–0	1–2	0–0		0–1	1–2	1–0	0–2	1–3	0–1	1–0	0–2
Nasarawa United	2–1	2–0	1–0	1–0	2–1	1–1	2–0	1–0	1–0	1–1	2–1	1–1		1–0	2–1	1–1	2–1	2–0	1–1	1–0
Niger Tornadoes	1–1	0–1	1–0	2–1	2–1	1–0	2–1	2–1	2–1	4–0	0–1	1–1	1–0		1–0	1–0	0–0	2–0	1–0	1–0
Plateau United	1–0	3–0	5–0	4–0	1–0	1–1	3–0	1–0	1–0	1–0	2–1	2–0	3–2	1–0		1–0	1–0	3–1	2–0	3–1
Remo Stars	1–0	0–1	4–1	1–0	1–0	1–0	3–0	1–3	2–0	3–0	3–1	1–0	0–0	3–0	1–0		1–1	1–0	3–0	1–0
Rivers United	2–1	4–1	2–1	1–0	2–0	1–0	3–1	1–0	3–0	3–0	1–0	5–0	2–1	3–0	2–0	1–0		2–0	0–0	3–0
Shooting Stars	2–2	1–1	1–0	1–1	2–0	0–0	4–0	1–0	1–0	2–1	3–0	1–1	1–0	1–0	2–1	1–1	3–2		2–2	0–0
Sunshine Stars	1–0	0–0	2–1	0–0	0–1	2–0	3–1	3–0	2–0	1–0	3–0	2–1	2–1	2–1	1–0	0–1	1–0	0–0		2–1
Wikki Tourists	1–0	2–0	2–0	0–0	0–0	1–0	0–0	2–1	2–0	1–1	1–0	3–0	2–0	1–0	2–1	1–2	1–0	1–1	1–0	

Source: NPFL
Legend: Blue = home team win; Yellow = draw; Red = away team win.

== Positions by round ==
To preserve chronological evolvements, any postponed matches are not included to the round at which they were originally scheduled, but added to the full round they were played immediately afterwards. For example, if a match is scheduled for round 7, but then played between rounds 8 and 9, it will be added to the standings for round 8.

Team ╲ Round	1	2	3	4	5	6	7	8	9	10	11	12	13	14	15	16	17	18	19	20	21	22	23	24	25	26	27	28	29	30	31	32	33	34	35	36	37	38
Abia Warriors	15	8	7	11	17	8	12	14	14	14	13	15	15	16	15	15	16	13	13	15	13	15	15	14	14	18	13	14	13	14	15	12	15	13	16	12	16	13
Akwa United	1	3	2	5	7	4	6	9	7	7	7	8	6	5	6	4	6	6	6	8	9	8	7	7	5	6	5	7	5	7	7	8	8	8	8	8	8	9
Dakkada	20	11	14	14	8	13	16	17	16	18	17	18	18	19	18	19	17	19	16	18	15	16	14	15	16	15	17	18	19	20	20	19	18	17	19	19	17	14
Enugu Rangers	5	7	8	3	4	3	3	3	3	4	6	4	3	4	5	5	4	3	3	3	3	3	3	4	3	4	3	4	3	3	3	3	3	4	4	5	5	5
Enyimba	4	2	5	9	3	5	7	4	4	5	4	5	7	7	8	7	8	9	10	7	8	7	9	8	9	7	7	6	7	6	4	6	4	6	5	6	6	7
Gombe United	12	15	17	10	16	15	18	13	15	15	14	10	8	9	10	9	10	10	11	9	11	9	8	10	8	9	8	9	8	9	8	9	9	9	9	9	7	8
Heartland	7	16	10	17	9	12	17	19	19	19	19	19	19	18	17	18	15	18	18	20	20	20	20	18	19	17	19	17	18	17	18	18	19	18	18	18	18	18
Kano Pillars	19	17	20	15	20	11	15	12	10	11	11	14	16	14	14	14	12	14	12	13	14	13	16	19	17	19	18	19	17	12	14	16	16	19	13	16	19	19
Katsina United	16	19	15	18	13	18	14	18	18	16	18	17	17	17	19	17	19	16	15	17	18	19	19	17	15	14	16	15	14	15	13	14	13	14	14	17	15	17
Kwara United	2	5	4	4	5	9	5	10	8	8	5	7	5	6	5	6	5	4	5	4	5	5	5	5	6	5	6	5	6	5	6	5	6	5	6	4	4	4
Lobi Stars	9	13	6	13	6	10	11	8	13	13	15	12	13	13	13	13	14	17	19	16	17	17	17	16	18	16	15	16	16	18	17	17	14	16	12	14	13	15
MFM	18	20	16	19	14	19	20	20	20	20	20	20	20	20	20	20	20	20	20	19	19	18	18	20	20	20	20	20	20	19	19	20	20	20	20	20	20	20
Nasarawa United	8	12	11	7	11	7	10	7	11	10	9	9	11	10	11	11	11	12	14	12	10	11	12	13	12	13	12	13	12	13	11	11	11	11	10	11	11	6
Niger Tornadoes	6	9	9	16	19	20	13	16	17	17	16	16	12	15	16	16	18	15	17	14	16	14	13	12	13	12	14	12	15	16	16	15	17	15	17	13	10	12
Plateau United	17	10	13	8	12	6	4	5	5	3	3	2	1	2	2	2	2	2	2	2	2	2	2	2	2	2	2	2	2	2	2	2	2	2	2	2	2	2
Remo Stars	3	1	1	1	1	1	1	2	2	2	1	3	4	4	3	3	3	5	4	5	4	4	4	3	4	3	4	3	4	4	5	4	5	3	3	3	3	3
Rivers United	10	4	3	2	2	2	2	1	1	1	2	1	2	1	1	1	1	1	1	1	1	1	1	1	1	1	1	1	1	1	1	1	1	1	1	1	1	1
Shooting Stars	11	14	18	12	18	17	19	15	12	6	10	6	10	12	12	12	13	11	9	11	12	12	11	11	11	11	11	11	10	11	12	13	12	12	15	15	14	16
Sunshine Stars	14	18	19	20	15	14	8	11	9	12	12	13	14	8	9	8	9	7	8	6	7	6	6	6	7	8	10	8	9	8	9	7	7	7	7	7	9	11
Wikki Tourists	13	6	12	6	10	16	9	6	6	9	8	11	9	11	7	10	7	8	7	10	6	10	10	9	10	10	9	10	11	10	10	10	10	10	11	10	12	10

Leader
Champions League
Confederation Cup
Relegation to Nigeria National League

Source: World Football

== Results by matches played ==
Team ╲ Round	1	2	3	4	5	6	7	8	9	10	11	12	13	14	15	16	17	18	19	20	21	22	23	24	25	26	27	28	29	30	31	32	33	34	35	36	37	38
Abia Warriors	L	W	D	D	L	W	L	D	L	W	D	L	D	L	W	L	D	W	D	W	L	D	D	L	L	W	W	W	L	L	W	L	L	W	D	W	D	W
Akwa United	W	D	W	L	L	W	D	L	W	D	D	D	W	W	L	W	D	L	L	D	D	W	D	W	W	L	D	D	W	L	D	L	W	L	W	L	D	L
Dakkada	L	W	L	D	W	L	L	D	D	L	W	L	L	L	W	L	W	L	W	L	W	L	W	L	L	W	L	L	L	W	W	D	W	L	L	W	W	W
Enugu Rangers	W	L	D	W	D	W	W	D	D	L	D	W	W	L	D	D	W	W	W	L	W	L	D	L	W	D	W	L	W	L	W	L	L	D	L	D	L	W
Enyimba	W	W	L	L	W	D	L	W	W	L	W	D	L	D	L	W	L	D	D	W	L	W	L	W	L	W	D	W	L	W	W	L	W	L	D	L	L	L
Gombe United	D	D	L	W	L	D	L	W	L	W	D	W	W	D	L	W	L	D	L	W	D	W	D	L	W	L	W	L	W	L	W	L	D	D	W	L	W	L
Heartland	D	L	W	L	W	L	L	L	L	L	D	D	W	D	W	L	W	L	D	L	L	D	L	W	D	W	L	W	L	W	L	W	L	W	D	W	L	W
Kano Pillars	L	D	L	W	L	W	L	W	W	D	L	L	L	W	D	L	W	L	W	L	D	D	L	W	L	W	L	W	W	W	L	D	L	W	W	L	L	W
Katsina United	L	L	W	L	W	L	D	L	L	W	L	W	L	D	L	W	L	W	D	L	L	W	L	W	W	L	W	W	L	L	W	L	W	L	L	L	W	L
Kwara United	W	L	W	D	D	L	W	L	W	D	W	L	W	L	W	D	W	W	L	W	L	D	D	D	L	W	L	W	L	W	L	W	L	W	L	W	W	L
Lobi Stars	D	D	W	L	W	L	D	W	L	D	L	W	L	W	L	L	L	L	L	W	L	D	L	W	L	W	W	L	D	W	D	W	L	W	W	L	W	L
MFM	L	L	W	L	W	L	L	L	L	L	D	L	W	D	W	D	L	D	D	W	L	W	L	L	D	L	L	W	D	W	D	D	L	W	L	L	L	L
Nasarawa United	D	D	D	W	L	W	L	W	L	W	D	D	L	W	L	D	L	D	L	W	W	L	D	L	W	L	W	L	W	L	W	L	W	L	W	L	W	W
Niger Tornadoes	W	L	D	L	D	L	W	L	L	D	W	D	W	L	L	D	L	W	L	W	L	W	D	W	L	W	L	W	L	L	W	L	W	L	W	W	W	L
Plateau United	L	W	L	W	L	W	W	L	W	W	W	W	W	D	W	W	W	D	W	L	W	D	W	L	W	L	L	W	L	W	L	W	L	D	L	W	L	W
Remo Stars	W	W	D	D	W	W	W	D	D	D	W	L	L	L	W	L	W	L	W	L	W	D	D	W	L	W	L	W	L	L	D	W	L	W	L	W	W	W
Rivers United	D	W	W	D	D	W	W	W	D	W	L	W	D	W	W	W	W	D	W	D	W	W	W	L	W	L	W	L	W	W	W	L	W	D	L	W	L	W
Shooting Stars	D	D	L	W	L	D	L	W	W	W	L	W	L	D	L	D	L	W	W	L	D	L	W	L	W	D	W	L	D	L	D	L	W	D	D	D	W	L
Sunshine Stars	L	D	D	W	D	W	D	W	L	L	D	L	W	W	L	W	L	W	L	W	L	W	D	W	L	D	L	D	D	W	L	W	W	L	W	L	L	L
Wikki Tourists	W	L	W	L	L	W	W	W	L	D	L	W	D	L	W	L	W	L	D	L	W	L	D	W	D	L	W	L	L	W	L	W	D	D	L	W	L	W

W = Win; D = Draw; L = Loss

== Statistics ==
=== Scoring ===
==== Top scorers ====
As of 17 July 2022

Rank	Player	Club	Goals
1	(Nigeria) Chijioke Akuneto	Rivers United	19
1	(Nigeria) Yusuf Abdulazeez	Gombe United	16
1	(Nigeria) Victor Mbaoma	Enyimba	16
4	(Nigeria) Odoh Valentine	Abia Warriors	15
5	(Nigeria) Ishaq Rafiu	Rivers United	14
6	(Nigeria) Andy Okpe	Remo Stars	13
7	(Nigeria) Godwin Obaje	Abia Warriors	12
8	(Nigeria) Zulkifilu Rabiu	Plateau United	11
8	(Nigeria) Tochukwu Udeh	Nasarawa United	11
10	(Nigeria) Samad Kadiri	Kwara United	10
10	(Nigeria) Ossy Martins	Enugu Rangers	10
10	(Nigeria) Leonard Ugochukwu	Sunshine Stars	10

==== Hat-tricks ====
Player	For	Against	Score	Date
(Nigeria) Chijioke Akuneto	Rivers United	Akwa United	4–1 (H)	20 March 2022
(Nigeria) Victor Mbaoma	Enyimba	Kwara United	3–0 (H)	12 June 2022
(Nigeria) Andy Okpe	Remo Stars	Niger Tornadoes	3–0 (H)	17 July 2022

Notes

(H) – Home team
