= 2022–23 Akwa United F.C. season =

27th season in existence of Akwa United

Akwa United
2022–23 season
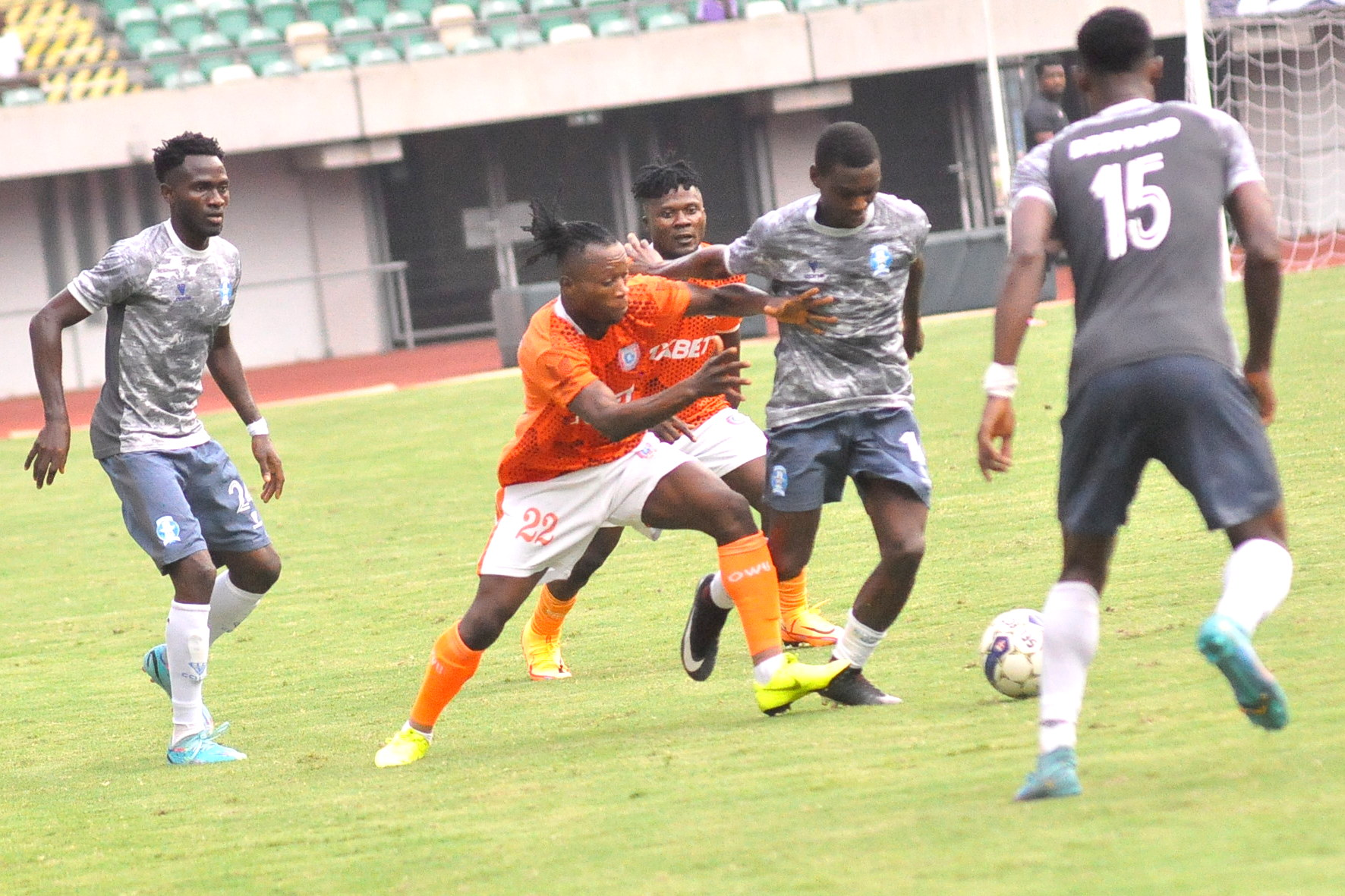
- Akwa United playing against Shooting Stars during the league season at Godswill Akpabio Stadium on 26 March 2023
- Chairman: Paul Bassey
- Manager: Ayodeji Ayeni
- Nigeria Professional Football League: 4th (in Group A)
- Nigeria FA Cup: Round of 32
- Top goalscorer: League: Cyril Olisema (6); All: Cyril Olisema (6)
- Biggest win: 3–0 (vs. Nasarawa United (A), 22 January 2023, NPFL)

The 2022–23 season was Akwa United's 27th season in the Nigerian football league system and their 14th (non-consecutive) season in the top tier of Nigerian football.

During the season, Akwa United participated in the Nigeria Professional Football League and the Nigeria Federation Cup.

They began their Nigeria Professional Football League campaign with a shock home loss against Bendel Insurance. The Uyo club went into the final day of the regular season with a chance to secure a championship play-off place. They earned a 1-0 win at Gombe United, but it wasn't enough to seal qualification for the play-off as results elsewhere did not go their way.

They entered the Nigeria Federation Cup in the Round of 62, where they defeated Wikki Tourists through a goal from Liman Ahmadu. Their hopes of winning the Cup ended after they lost to Nigeria National League side EFCC in the Round of 32.

== First-team squad ==
As of 21 May 2023

No.	Name	Position	Nationality (flag)	Date of birth (age)	Apps	Goals
Goalkeepers
1	Godgift Elkanah	GK	(Nigeria)	15 November 2000 (age 25)	1	0
18	Jean Efala	GK	(Cameroon)	11 August 1992 (age 33)	17	0
33	Uche Okafor	GK	(Nigeria)	10 February 1991 (age 35)	0	0
Defenders
2	James Ajako	LB	(Nigeria)	9 March 2003 (age 23)	18	3
3	Wisdom Ndon	CB	(Nigeria)	6 November 2005 (age 20)	11	0
5	Anthony Anioke	CB	(Nigeria)		8	0
6	Abbey Benson	CB	(Nigeria)	12 June 1998 (age 27)	11	0
20	Matthew Etim	RB	(Nigeria)	2 September 1989 (age 36)	4	0
21	David Philip	LB	(Nigeria)	8 August 1994 (age 31)	1	0
23	Boluwaji Sholumade	CB	(Nigeria)	27 March 2003 (age 23)	8	0
25	Taiye Muritala	RB	(Nigeria)	3 June 2001 (age 25)	13	2
29	Abdulasam Saeed	CB	(Nigeria)	23 December 2003 (age 22)	2	0
31	Pascal Onunze	CB	(Nigeria)	27 March 2003 (age 23)	2	0
Midfielders
4	Osimaga Duke	DM	(Nigeria)	30 July 2000 (age 25)	2	0
11	Azeez Olamilekan	AM	(Nigeria)		6	0
14	Cyril Olisema	AM	(Nigeria)	4 March 1995 (age 31)	13	6
15	Salomon Chigoziem	CM	(Nigeria)		14	0
27	Ubong Essien	DM	(Nigeria)	17 December 2001 (age 24)	15	0
30	Ebetomame Oghenetega	AM	(Nigeria)		4	0
36	Onyekachi Nwaiwu	CM	(Nigeria)	12 November 2000 (age 25)	4	0
Forwards
7	Ubong Friday	LW	(Nigeria)	3 March 1998 (age 28)	16	4
8	Moses Effiong	LW	(Nigeria)	1 February 2001 (age 25)	7	0
9	Valentine Obilor	ST	(Nigeria)	14 February 2001 (age 25)	4	0
10	Wisdom Fernando	LW	(Nigeria)	28 February 2002 (age 24)	7	0
12	Ndifreke Effiong	ST	(Nigeria)	15 August 1998 (age 27)	2	0
17	Ifeanyi Ogba	ST	(Nigeria)		8	0
19	Uche Collins	ST	(Nigeria)	19 November 2000 (age 25)	17	4
22	Kehinde Olajuyin	ST	(Nigeria)	4 December 1995 (age 30)	2	0
22	Emmanuel Ugwuka	ST	(Nigeria)		2	0
26	Ikechukwu Nwani	RW	(Nigeria)	17 October 1998 (age 27)	2	0
32	Liman Ahmadu	RW	(Nigeria)		9	1

== Competitions ==
Win Draw Loss

=== Nigeria Professional Football League ===
==== Regular season ====
===== Group A =====
====== League table ======
Pos	Team	Pld	W	D	L	GF	GA	GD	Pts	
1	Bendel Insurance	18	8	10	0	22	11	+11	34	Qualification to Championship round
2	Remo Stars	18	9	6	3	21	14	+7	33	Qualification to Championship round
3	Enyimba	18	9	5	4	25	12	+13	32	Qualification to Championship round
4	Akwa United	18	9	5	4	24	14	+10	32	
5	Plateau United	18	7	5	6	29	23	+6	26	
6	Shooting Stars	18	5	8	5	20	20	0	23	
7	Gombe United	18	4	7	7	10	20	−10	19	
8	Kwara United	18	4	5	9	11	22	−11	17	
9	Nasarawa United	18	3	5	10	15	23	−8	14	Relegation to the National League
10	El-Kanemi Warriors	18	2	4	12	10	28	−18	10	Relegation to the National League

Updated to match(es) played on 21 May 2023. Source: Besoccer
Rules for classification: 1) points; 2) goal difference; 3) number of goals scored

==== Matches ====
On 28 December 2022, the fixtures for the forthcoming season were announced.

8 January 2023 1	Akwa United	0-2	Bendel Insurance	Uyo
15:00 GMT		Report	Imade Osarenkhoe 38'; Ismail Sarki 41'	Stadium: Godswill Akpabio Stadium

18 January 2023 2	Enyimba	0-0	Akwa United	Aba
15:00 GMT		Report		Stadium: Enyimba Stadium

22 January 2023 3	Nasarawa United	0–3	Akwa United	Jos
15:00 GMT		Report	James Ajako 43'; Ndifreke Effiong 47' (74)	Stadium: New Jos Stadium

29 January 2023 4	Akwa United	1–0	Plateau United	Eket
15:00 GMT	James Ajako 79'	Report		Stadium: Eket Stadium

1 February 2023 5	Kwara United	2-1	Akwa United	Ibadan
15:00 GMT	Wasiu Alalade 15'; Dagbo Muritala 86'	Report	Cyril Olisema 69'	Stadium: Lekan Salami Stadium

5 February 2023 6	Akwa United	3–1	Remo Stars	Uyo
15:00 GMT	Cyril Olisema 15' (pen.); Uche Collins 45+2'; Olalere Segun 60' (o.g.)	Report	Qudus Akanni 24'	Stadium: Godswill Akpabio Stadium

12 February 2023 7	El-Kanemi	1–1	Akwa United	Maiduguri
15:00 GMT	Junior Agnasa 85'	Report	Uche Collins 45'	Stadium: El-Kanemi Stadium

16 February 2023 8	Akwa United	1–0	Gombe United	Uyo
15:00 GMT	Uche Collins 8'	Report		Stadium: Godswill Akpabio Stadium

19 February 2023 9	Shooting Stars	2–2	Akwa United	Ibadan
15:00 GMT	Joshua Akpan 14'; Ibrahim Ajani 45+6'	Report	Uche Collins 20'; Liman Ahmadu 27'	Stadium: Lekan Salami Stadium

26 March 2023 10	Akwa United	2–0	Shooting Stars	Uyo
15:00 GMT	Ubong Friday 53'; Taiye Muritala 55'	Report		Stadium: Godswill Akpabio Stadium

29 March 2023 11	Bendel Insurance	1–1	Akwa United	Benin City
15:00 GMT	Imade Osarenkhoe 3'	Report	Cyril Olisema 34'	Stadium: Samuel Ogbemudia Stadium

2 April 2021 12	Akwa United	1–0	Enyimba	Uyo
15:00 GMT	Uche Collins 73'	Report		Stadium: Godswill Akpabio Stadium

9 April 2023 13	Akwa United	2–2	Nasarawa United	Uyo
15:00 GMT	Cyril Olisema 21'; Victor Collins 56' (own goal)	Report	Victor Collins 20'; Anas Yusuf 87'	Stadium: Godswill Akpabio Stadium

16 April 2023 14	Plateau United	1–0	Akwa United	Jos
15:00 GMT	Ibrahim Mustapha 36' (pen.)	Report		Stadium: New Jos Stadium

24 April 2023 15	Akwa United	3–1	Kwara United	Uyo
15:00 GMT	Taiye Muritala 19'; Cyril Olisema 27'; Ubong Friday 45+3'	Report	Samad Kadiri 49'	Stadium: Godswill Akpabio Stadium

30 April 2023 16	Remo Stars	1–0	Akwa United	Ikenne
15:00 GMT	Nduka Junior 45+3' (pen.)	Report		Stadium: Rem Stars Stadium

7 May 2023 17	Akwa United	2–0	El-Kanemi	Uyo
15:00 GMT	Ubong Friday 10' (62)	Report		Stadium: Godswill Akpabio Stadium

21 May 2023 18	Gombe United	0–1	Akwa United	Gombe
15:00 GMT	James Ajako 30'	Report		Stadium: Pantami Stadium
