= Ayodeji Ayeni =

Nigerian football manager

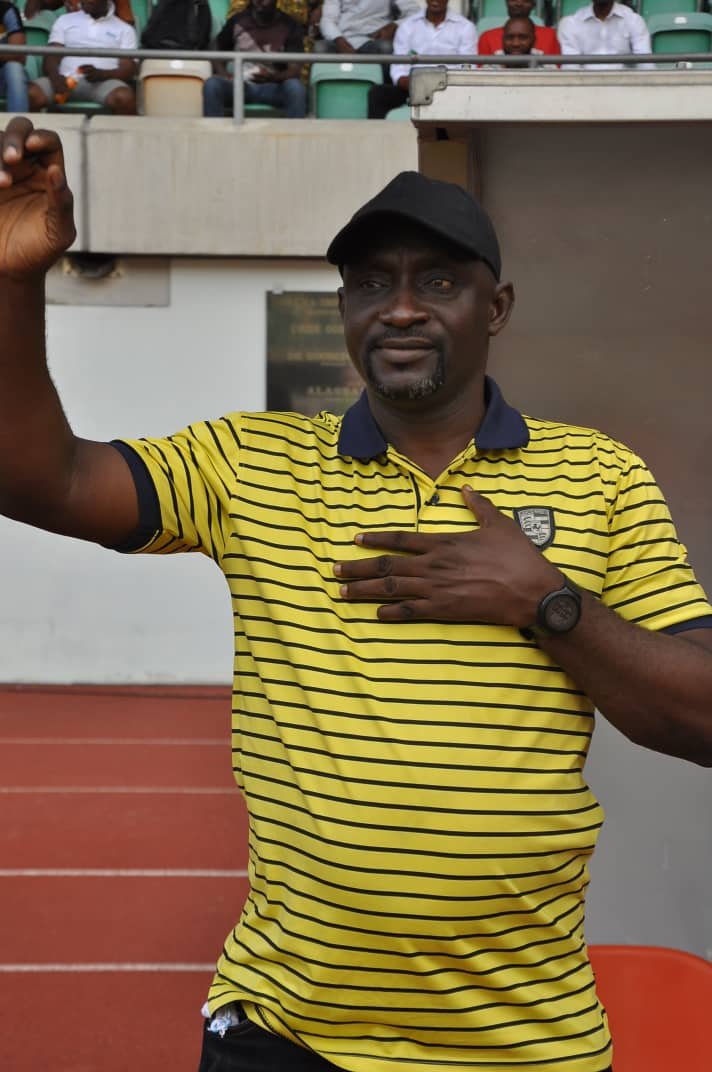
- Nigerian football coach Ayodeji Ayeni at Godswill Akpabio Stadium on June 1, 2022

Personal information
- Full name: Ayodeji Alexander Ayeni
- Date of birth: 24 February 1972 (age 54)
- Place of birth: Ilesha
- Height: 5 ft 10 in (1.78 m)
- Position: Central defender

Team information
- Current team: Akwa United (head coach)

Senior career*
Years	Team	Apps	(Gls)
1994–1997	Concord F.C.		
1997–1998	Bendel Insurance		
1998	Doyin F.C.		
1998–2000	Niger Tornadoes		
2000–2001	Nepa		
2001–2004	Kwara United		
2004–2005	Kogi United		
2005–2006	Crown		
2006–2008	Osun United		
2009–2010	East Riffa Club		

Managerial career
- 2013–2016: Prime FC
- 2018–2019: Cynosure F.C.
- 2019–2021: Ekiti United
- 2021–2022: Sunshine Stars
- 2022–: Akwa United
- * Club domestic league appearances and goals

Ayodeji Ayeni (born 24 February 1972) is a Nigerian football coach and former player who is currently the head coach of Nigeria Professional Football League club Akwa United.

== Coaching career ==
Ayeni's first head coach role at a top-flight club came in June 2021, when he joined Sunshine Stars from Ekiti United who were in the NNL at the time.

On 24 March 2022, Ayeni moved to Akwa United to replace Kennedy Boboye, who had quit the club on 14 February 2022 after a poor run of results. His first game as Akwa United boss, a Nigeria Professional Football League fixture against Rivers United at Godswill Akpabio Stadium on 2 April 2022, ended 1–1. He recorded his first win as manager of the Uyo club with a 2–1 victory over Shooting Stars on 11 April 2022.

== Honours ==
=== Individual ===
- Nigeria Professional Football League Coach of the Month: April 2022
