= Mohammed Shuaib =

Nigerian footballer

Personal information
- Full name: Mohammed Sani Shuaibu
- Date of birth: November 17, 1984 (age 41)
- Place of birth: Minna, Nigeria
- Position: Midfielder

Team information
- Current team: Shooting Stars F.C.
- Number: 12

Senior career*
Years	Team	Apps	(Gls)
1999–2004	Niger Tornadoes F.C.	74	(2)
2005–2008	Kwara United F.C.	66	(6)
2009–Present	Shooting Stars F.C.	4	(0)
- * Club domestic league appearances and goals as of December 31, 2006

Mohammed Sani Shuaibu (born November 17, 1984, in Minna) is a Nigerian football player currently with Shooting Stars F.C.

== Early life ==
Hails from Minna in Minna local government area of Niger State, he is otherwise called ‘Efosa', his ambition is to become a successful professional player.

== Career ==
He started his professional career with the Niger Tornadoes F.C. of Minna (1999–2004) and joined Kwara United F.C. of Ilorin for the 2005 season. He was in the National Challenge FA Cup winning team in 2000 which qualified the team to play in the African Winners (Mandela) Cup in 2001. he was a member of the Niger Tornadoes F.C. team that played the West African Football Union (WAFU) in 2000. In September 2009 the former member of Niger Tornadoes F.C. and Kwara United F.C. signed for Shooting Stars F.C.
