= Afeez Nosiru =

Nigerian association footballer

Personal information
- Full name: Afeez Babatunde Nosiru
- Date of birth: 1 March 1998 (age 28)
- Place of birth: Lagos, Nigeria
- Height: 1.80 m (5 ft 11 in)
- Position: Midfielder

Team information
- Current team: Kwara United
- Number: 28

Senior career*
Years	Team	Apps	(Gls)
–2019	Kwara United		
2019–2020	Niger Tornadoes	11	(1)
2020–2023	Kwara United	89	(4)
2023	Panetolikos	2	(0)
2023–	Kwara United		

International career^{‡}
2022–	Nigeria	3	(0)
- * Club domestic league appearances and goals as of 19:26, 21 April 2024 (UTC) ‡ National team caps and goals as of 13 October 2022

Afeez Babatunde Nosiru (born 1 March 1998) is a Nigerian professional footballer who plays as a midfielder for Kwara United.

== Career ==
His career peaked at Kwara United after his return from Niger Tornadoes, where he was instrumental to the club's success between 2020 and 2022 as the club narrowly qualified for the CAF Confederation Cup.

He was also called up for the national team before he was eventually signed by Greek club, Panetolikos.

In 2024, he returned to Kwara United.

== Style of play ==
Nosiru plays as a midfielder and has been described as a great passer of the ball; at Kwara United, he is the main spot-kick taker.
