= Christmas Unplugged Festival (Akwa Ibom State) =

Annual Christmas cultural and entertainment festival in Akwa Ibom State, Nigeria

- Dates: 1 December – 1 January
- Frequency: Annually
- Venue: Unity Park (Ibom Christmas Park), Uyo
- Locations: Uyo, Akwa Ibom State, Nigeria
- Years active: 2023–present
- Founders: Government of Akwa Ibom State
- Website: Akwa Ibom Christmas Unplugged

Christmas Unplugged Festival is an annual 32-day Christmas cultural and entertainment festival held in Uyo, Akwa Ibom State, Nigeria. The festival takes place from 1 December to 1 January at Unity Park (also known as Akwa Ibom Christmas village) and features daily performances, exhibitions, and entertainment activities showcasing the state's cultural heritage.

== Overview ==
Christmas Unplugged was introduced as a month-long celebration designed to promote tourism, local businesses, and cultural exchange in Akwa Ibom State. Each day of the festival highlights one of the state's 31 local government areas through traditional music, dance, cuisine, crafts, and exhibitions.

Christmas Unplugged has become one of the festive events in south-south Nigeria, attracting residents, visitors, expatriates, and diaspora returnees. Its emphasis on cultural identity

The festival typically features:

- Cultural performances and heritage displays
- Local cuisine and culinary showcases
- Art and craft exhibitions
- Comedy shows, stage drama, and dance competitions
- Live concerts by regional and national artists
- A large night market and entertainment village

== Venue ==
The event is hosted at the Unity Park also called Akwa Ibom Christmas Park, a multipurpose public space in Uyo designed for tourism and large gatherings. The park hosts hundreds of temporary kiosks rented by small and medium-scale vendors during the festival period.

== See also ==
- Akwa Ibom Christmas Carols Festival
- Akwa Ibom Christmas Village
- Tourism in Nigeria
