= Chibundu =

Chibundu is a given name. Notable people with the name include:

- Chibundu Amah, Nigerian footballer
- Chibundu Onuzo (born 1991), Nigerian novelist
