= 2022 Nigeria Federation Cup =

Abandoned Nigerian football tournament

2022 AITEO Cup
Tournament details
- Country: Nigeria
- Dates: 26 July –
- Teams: 72
- All statistics correct as of 26 July 2022.

The 2022 Nigeria Federation Cup (known as the 2022 Aiteo Cup for sponsorship reasons), was originally going to be the 75th edition of the Nigeria FA Cup, Nigeria's elite cup tournament for football clubs. It commenced on 26 July but was abandoned at the quarter-finals

This year's tournament saw 72 clubs from 36 states and the FCT qualify as their state cup winners and runners-up.

== League representation ==
Players	Federation
NPFL	17 teams
NNL	26 teams
NLO	15 teams
Non-league	15 teams

== Schedule ==
Stage	Dates
Rookie stage	26 & 27 July 2022
First round	30 & 31 July 2022
Round of 32	3 August 2022
Round of 16	6 & 7 August 2022
Quarter-finals	TBD
Semi-finals	TBD
Final	TBD at TBD

== Format ==
As with previous editions, it was a single elimination knockout tournament with all matches played at neutral venues. The 18 lowest ranked clubs (mostly debutants) entered the rookie stage, the winners of the rookie stage joining the remaining 55 clubs in the first round. If a match ended in a draw in regulation time, it went straight to a penalty shootout.

== Rookie stage ==
Team 1	Score	Team 2
26 July 2022
Lautai United (JIG)	? ?	ABJ FC (BAU)
Sokoto Professionals (SOK)	0–2	Saki United (OYO)
PCM FC (EBY)	4–1	FC Binani (ADA)
Gamji Eaglets (TAR)	? ?	Hammola FC (OSU)
Nasarawu FC (TAR)	? ?	Fulfill FC (KAD)
Eaglets FC (ZAM)	? ?	FC Classic (ADA)
27 July 2022
Osevan FC (DEL)	1–0	Peace FC (ANA)
Police Crime Burster (RIV)	0–1	Dreams Football Academy (BAY)
Bendel Insurance Feeders (EDO)	1–0	FMC FC (KOG)

== First round ==
Team 1	Score	Team 2
30 July 2022
Bayelsa United (BAY)	4–1	Osevan FC (DEL)
EFCC FC (FCT)	w/o (Note: Green Beret won on walkover after EFCC FC failed to show up for the match.)	Green Beret (KAD)
Enyimba (ABI)	1–1(2–1 p)	Ijebu United (OGU)
Dreams Football Academy (BAY)	1–2	Niger Tornadoes (NIG)
Apex Krane (DEL)	0–0 (3–4 p)	Doma United (GOM)
Nnewi United (ANA)	1–1 (4–5 p)	Akure City Academy (OND)
J M Liberty (BEN)	0–1	Heartland (IMO)
FRSC FC (NAS)	(Note: Dakkada qualified for the Round of 16 on walkover after both teams failed to show up for the match.)	Adoration FC (ENU)
Rivers United (RIV)	w/o (Note: Dakkada won walkover after Rivers United pulled out of the competition.)	Dakkada (AKW)
Calabar Rovers (CRV)	0–0 (4–2 p)	Gombe United (GOM)
Mailantarki (FCT)	1–5	Cynosure FC (EBY)
Remo Stars (OGU)	4–1	PCM FC (EBO)
Essein Ayi (CRV)	0–3	Akwa United (AKW)
Mighty Jets (PLA)	2–3	Kogi United (KOG)
Kanta United (KEB)	0–0 (4–2 p)	Kebbi United (KEB)
Plateau United (PLA)	w/o (Note: DMD won on walkover as Plateau United failed to appear for the match.)	DMD FC (BOR)
Housing Corporation FC (OYO)	4–2	Jigawa Golden Stars (JIG)
Zamfara United (ZAM)	–	Gamji Eaglets (TAR)
Kano Pillars (KAN)	2–1	Niger Tornadoes Juniors (NIG)
Fulfill FC (KAD)	–	Olukismet FC (EKI)
El Kanemi Warriors (BOR)	2–1	Kun Khalifat FC (IMO)
Bendel Insurance (EDO)	2–0	Katsina United Juniors (KAT)
Ekiti United (EKI)	w/o (Note: Sokoto United won on walkover after Ekiti United failed to honour the match citing insecurity problems.)	Sokoto United (SOK)
Eaglets FC (ZAM)	0–4	Nasarawa United (NAS)
31 July 2022
Bendel Insurance Feeders (EDO)	1–0	Dannaz (LAG)
ABS FC (KWA)	0–1	Lobi Stars (BEN)
Enugu Rangers (ENU)	4–1	ABJ FC (BAU)
Sunshine Stars (OND)	0–0 (5–4 p)	Osun United (OSU)
Saki United (OYO)	2–2 (4–5 p)	Katsina United (KAT)
Wikki Tourists (BAU)	0–0 (6–5 p)	Kano Pillars Juniors (KAN)
Yobe Desert Stars (YOB)	0–2	Kwara United (KWA)
Ottasolo (LAG)	2–1	Abia Warriors (ABI)

== Round of 32 ==
Team 1	Score	Team 2
3 August 2022
Bayelsa United (BAY)	0–0 (4–5 p)	Green Beret (KAD)
Enyimba (ABI)	0–0 (5–6 p)	Niger Tornadoes (NIG)
Doma United (GOM)	0–3	Lobi Stars (BEN)
Akure City Academy (OND)	2–1	Bendel Insurance Feeders (EDO)
Enugu Rangers (ENU)	1–1 (7–8 p)	Heartland (IMO)
Bye	–	Dakkada (AKW)
Sunshine Stars (OND)	5–1	Calabar Rovers (CRV)
Cynosure (EBY)	1–3	Katsina United (KAT)
Remo Stars (OGU)	0–3	Akwa United (AKW)
Kogi United (KOG)	2–2 (5–4 p)	Kanta United (KEB)
DMD FC (BOR)	0–0 (4–2 p)	Housing Corporation FC (OYO)
Zamfara United (ZAM)	0–5	Kano Pillars (KAN)
Fulfill FC (KAD	0–1	El-Kanemi Warriors (BOR)
Kwara United (KWA)	1–1 (3–4 p)	Wikki Tourists (BAU)
Bendel Insurance (EDO)	1–1 (4–3 p)	Ottasolo (LAG)
Sokoto United (SOK)	1–1 (10–11 p)	Nasarawa United (NAS)

== Round of 16 ==
Team 1	Score	Team 2
6 August 2022
Green Beret (KAD)	0–1	Niger Tornadoes (NIG)
Lobi Stars (BEN)	1–0	Akure City Academy (OND)
Heartland (IMO)	1–1(p)	Dakkada (AKW)
Sunshine Stars (OND)	1–1(p)	Katsina United(KAT)
DMD FC (BOR)	0–2	Kano Pillars (KAN)
El-Kanemi Warriors (BOR)	0–0(p)	Wikki Tourists (BAU)
Bendel Insurance (EDO)	1–2	Nasarawa United (NAS)
7 August 2022
Akwa United (AKW)	1–2	Kogi United (KOG)

== Quarterfinals ==
Team 1	Score	Team 2
10 August 2022
Niger Tornadoes (NIG)	w/o	Lobi Stars (BEN)
Heartland (IMO)	1–0	Katsina United(KAT)
Kogi United (KOG)	w/o	Kano Pillars (KAN)
Wikki Tourists (BAU)	–	Nasarawa United (NAS)
