= Yusuf Abdulazeez =

Nigerian football player (born 2002)

Personal information
- Date of birth: 9 March 2002 (age 24)
- Place of birth: Akure, Nigeria
- Height: 1.83 m (6 ft 0 in)
- Position: Forward

Team information
- Current team: Norrby IF
- Number: 9

Youth career
- –2020: Gombe United

Senior career*
Years	Team	Apps	(Gls)
2020–2022	Gombe United	53	(20)
2022–2025	Mjällby AIF	4	(0)
2023	→ Skövde AIK (loan)	13	(6)
2024	→ Varberg (loan)	20	(3)
2025	→ Norrby IF (loan)	21	(5)
2026–	Norrby IF	26	(6)
- * Club domestic league appearances and goals as of 12 November 2026

Yusuf Abdulazeez (born 9 March 2002) is a Nigerian professional footballer who plays as an attacker for Swedish club Norrby.

== Career ==
Abdulazeez played for a local team in his hometown of Akure before a move to Zamfara State from where he secured a move to the Savannah Scorpions of Gombe United, whom he helped to gain promotion to the NPFL in 2020. Playing for Gombe United, Abdulazee finished as the joint second-highest scorer in the 2021–22 Nigeria Professional League, scoring 16 goals, 3 goals shy of the league top scorer Chijioke Akuneto of Rivers United.

A transfer to Swedish side Mjällby AIF of the Allsvenskan was agreed in September 2022. He signed a three-year deal to keep him in Listerlandet until 2025. He made his league debut for Mjälby on 16 October 2022 in a 3–0 home defeat against Hammarby IF.
