= Ayo Adejubu =

Nigerian footballer (born 2003)

Personal information
- Date of birth: 16 June 2003 (age 23)
- Place of birth: Nigeria
- Position: Winger

Team information
- Current team: Kwara United

Youth career
- Akure City

Senior career*
Years	Team	Apps	(Gls)
2019–2020	Sunshine Stars		
2020–2023	Shooting Stars		
2023–	Kwara United		

International career
2019–	Nigeria U17		
- * Club domestic league appearances and goals

Ayo Adejubu(born 16 June 2003) is a Nigerian professional footballer who plays as a winger for Nigerian Professional Football League club Shooting Stars.

== Playing career ==
As a child, Adejubu would sneak out to watch his favorite team, Sunshine Stars, conduct training sessions.

Adejubu initially played with the Sunshine Stars' youth team, third-tier side Akure City, before he was promoted to the first team in the Nigerian Professional Football League (NPFL) in January 2019. He made his professional debut on 11 February, coming on for Chibundu Amah during a 2–0 victory at home over Katsina United. He "shone in his debut season" in the league, and received further attention for his performance in the 2019 NPFL/ La Liga U15 Promises Tournament. After two seasons of sparse playing time, he cemented himself as a part of the first-team squad in the 2020–21 NPFL season.

In late 2021, Adejubu signed with Shooting Stars. In June 2022, he trialled with the Djurgårdens IF U21 side in Sweden.

Adejubu signed with Kwara United ahead of the 2023–24 NPFL season.
