= Roger Palmgren =

Swedish football manager

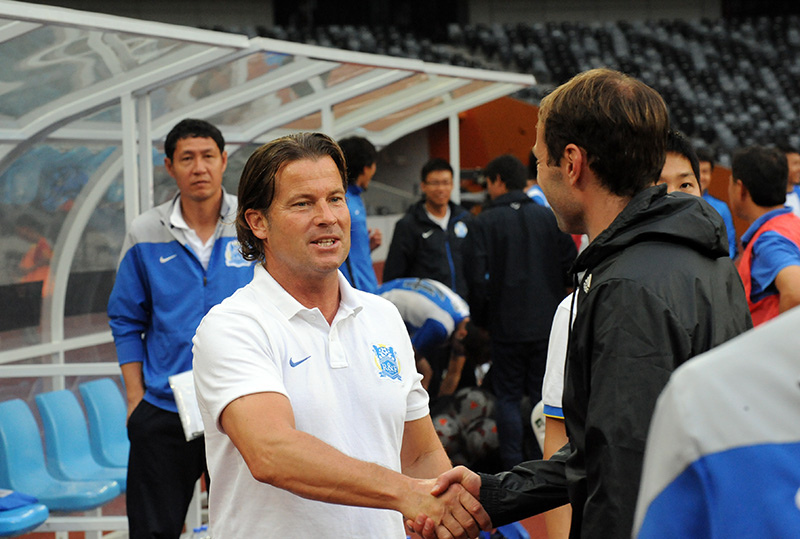

Personal information
- Full name: Roger Lennart Palmgren
- Date of birth: 11 March 1963 (age 63)
- Place of birth: Stockholm, Sweden

Managerial career
- Years: Team
- 1990–1993: Café Opera
- 1993–1994: AC Arezzo
- 1994–1996: Sierra Leone
- 1997–1998: Degerfors IF
- 1998–1999: AC Arezzo
- 1999–2000: DR Congo
- 2001–2004: Vasalunds IF
- 2004–2006: Rwanda
- 2006–2007: Kwara United
- 2007–2009: Thanda Royal Zulu
- 2009–2012: AmaZulu
- 2013: Namibia
- 2013–2014: Guangzhou R&F (assistant)
- 2015–2016: Shanghai SIPG (assistant)
- 2018–2019: Brommapojkarna (assistant)
- 2019–2021: FC Nacka Iliria

Roger Lennart Palmgren is a Swedish football manager.

He has been active as a club manager in nine countries: Italy, Sweden, Sierra Leone, Rwanda, Democratic Republic of the Congo, Nigeria, South Africa, Namibia and China. He has been coach of the national football teams of Sierra Leone, Rwanda and Namibia.

== Career ==
=== Cafe Opera and Arezzo ===
Roger started his coaching career in 1990 as a playing coach with Alessandro Catenacci's team Café Opera in Sweden. After climbing three divisions in three years, Palmgren received an offer in 1993 from Francesco Graziani to coach Primavera team FC Arezzo to explore a professional managing career. After great success, Palmgren got offered the job as coach for Sierra Leone national team.

=== Sierra Leone ===
When Palmgren won the Amílcar Cabral Cup (1995), and qualified to Africa Cup of Nations (1996) in South Africa with Sierra Leone national team, he made his break through as an international football manager. This is the best result in Sierra Leones football history yet.

=== Degerfors ===
After Sierra Leone, Palmgren worked as assistant coach and sport director for the Swedish Allsvenskan team Degerfors IF. When FC Arezzo offered him to come back coaching 1998, he took the challenge.

=== Vasalund ===
After the merger between Essinge IK and Vasalunds IF, Palmgren became sport director and later managing coach of Vasalunds IF between 2003 and 2004.

=== Rwanda ===
In August 2004, Palmgren relocated to Africa as he accepted the position head coach of Rwanda national football team, where he took the team to the final of the CECAFA Cup against Ethiopia. By the end of 2005, Palmgren took on the Nigerian club Kwara United F.C. in Nigeria Premier League and they eventually reached semi-finals in CAF Confederation Cup in 2006.

=== Thanda Royal Zulu ===
Palmgren moved to South Africa in May 2007 when he got an offer from a Swedish consortium to manage the club Thanda Royal Zulu F.C. in Premier Soccer League in Durban.

=== Amazulu ===
After two years with Thanda, he got offered to become sport director with the South African team Amazulu FC , and short thereafter head coach. Palmgren achieved the best league result ever for the club in 2011–12, as well as FA cup finals against Bidvest Wits FC.

=== Namibia ===
In 2013, Roger took the offer to coach Namibia national football team. Unfortunately he didn't stay long as he and his family were threatened by supporters and decided to resign

=== Guangzhou and Shanghai ===
Palmgren relocated to China, and started working as Sven-Göran Eriksson's assistant coach in the Chinese Super League with the team Guangzhou R&F.

=== Return to Sweden ===
On 5 September 2018, Palmgren was appointed as assistant manager of the Swedish club side IF Brommapojkarna, following the sacking of Luís Pimenta.

He was then manager of FC Nacka Iliria in Stockholm.

== Honours ==
Sierra Leone

- Amílcar Cabral Cup: 1995
