= Kafaru Alabi =

Nigerian footballer and coach

Personal information
- Place of birth: Nigeria
- Date of death: 9 January 2008
- Place of death: Ilorin, Nigeria
- Position: Midfielder

Senior career*
Years	Team	Apps	(Gls)
- Shooting Stars S.C.

Managerial career
- 2005–2006: Shooting Stars S.C.
- Kwara United F.C.
- * Club domestic league appearances and goals

Kafaru Alabi (died 9 January 2008) was a Nigerian association football player and coach. In the 1980s, he played as a midfielder for Nigerian club, Shooting Stars S.C., and later managed several Nigerian clubs including Shooting Stars and Kwara United.

== Coaching career ==
After retiring from playing, Alabi moved into coaching and held managerial roles in Nigerian club football. He served as head coach of Shooting Stars S.C. in 2005 and 2006, taking over the role following the dismissal of German coach Siegfried Bahner in June 2006.

Alabi also coached Kwara United F.C. during the mid-2000s. He also coached the El-Kanemi Warriors F.C., a club he assured his followers on 17 April 2007 that he will not leave following its financial issues.

== Later career ==
Like many Nigerian coaches of his time, Alabi worked during a period marked by administrative and competitive challenges in local football, including scrutiny of coaching performances in continental tournaments. After coaching SSC, he joined Kwara United F.C.

== Death ==
Alabi died on 9 January 2008 in Ilorin, Kwara State. He had been receiving treatment at the University of Ilorin Teaching Hospital before his death, reportedly due to complications related to a heart condition.
