= 2010 WAFU Club Championship =

International football competition

The 2010 WAFU Club Championship (sometimes referred to as the Eyadema Unity Cup) is an association football competition that is contested between club sides in the WAFU/UFOA region.

== First round ==
First leg matches were played 15th and 16 May 2010. Second leg matches took place 29th and 30 May.

ZONE A

| Team 1 | Agg. | Team 2 | 1st leg | 2nd leg |
|---|---|---|---|---|
| Horoya AC (Guinea) | 2–1 | (Senegal) ASC Camberene | 2–0 | 0–1 |
| Casa Sport (Senegal) | 3–0 | (The Gambia) Gambia Ports Authority F.C. | 2–0 | 1–0 |
| Athlético de Coléah (Guinea) | - | Bye | | |

ZONE B

| Team 1 | Agg. | Team 2 | 1st leg | 2nd leg |
|---|---|---|---|---|
| Lobi Stars (Nigeria) | 0–2 | (Benin) ASPAC FC | 0–0 | 0–2 |
| Stella Club (Ivory Coast) | 3–0 | (Niger) Akokana F.C. | 3–0 | 0–0 |
| Sharks FC (Nigeria) | 4–4 (8–7 pen.) | (Benin) USS Kraké | 3–1 | 1–3 |
| Niger Tornadoes (Nigeria) | - | Bye | | |

== Second round ==
| Team 1 | Agg. | Team 2 | 1st leg | 2nd leg |
|---|---|---|---|---|
| Horoya AC (Guinea) | 2–1 | (Guinea) Atlético Coléah | 1–1 | 1–0 |
| Casa Sport (Senegal) | - | Bye | | |
| Sharks FC (Nigeria) | 4–1 | (Benin) ASPAC FC | 4–1 | 0–0 |
| Niger Tornadoes (Nigeria) | 1–2 | (Ivory Coast) Stella Club | 1–0 | 0–2 |

Tornadoes-Stella first leg clash postponed a week to August 22 due to Stella's travel problem. Match then postponed again to Aug 29 Second leg held Sept. 12

== Third round ==
First Leg- October 3. Second Leg October 17–19 (Sharks at Stella postponed to October 27)

| Team 1 | Agg. | Team 2 | 1st leg | 2nd leg |
|---|---|---|---|---|
| Sharks FC (Nigeria) | 6–0 | (Ivory Coast) Stella Club | 5–0 | 1–0 |
| Horoya AC (Guinea) | 1–1 (5–6 pen.) | (Senegal) Casa Sport | 1–0 | 0–1 |

== Repechage ==
Winner makes Semifinals. First leg Second week of November

| Team 1 | Agg. | Team 2 | 1st leg | 2nd leg |
|---|---|---|---|---|
| Horoya AC (Guinea) | 3–0 | (Ivory Coast) Stella Club | 2–0 | 1–0 |

== Semifinals ==
To take place in Lomé.

- (Togo) AC Semassi F.C.
- (Senegal) Casa Sport
- (Nigeria) Sharks FC
- (Guinea) Horoya AC

Champion wins 10 million CFA Francs.

24 December 2010

| AC Semassi F.C. | 0–2 | Casa Sport |
|---|---|---|
| | Report |

Stade Municipal (Lomé)
24 December 2010

| Sharks FC | 2–2 (7–6 pen) | Horoya AC |

Stade Municipal (Lomé)

== Final ==
26 December 2010

| Sharks FC | 1–0 | Casa Sport |
|---|---|---|
| Victor Ezeji 10' | Report |

Stade Municipal (Lomé)

WAFU Club Championship 2010 Winners
(Nigeria)
Sharks FC
First title
