= Akwa Ibom Christmas Carols Festival =

Carol Festival in Nigeria

- Status: Active
- Genre: Festival
- Frequency: Annually
- Location: Akwa Ibom
- Country: Nigeria

The Akwa Ibom Christmas Carols Festival is a large gathering of carol singers in Nigeria. A concert featuring 25,272 carol singers at the Akwa Ibom Stadium was officially certified as the largest such gathering in the world by Guinness World Records on December 13, 2014, against a former record of 15,674 carol singers which was achieved the previous year (December 15, 2013) by a group called CENTI in Bogotá, Colombia.

== History ==
=== 2012–2013 edition ===
The 2012 festival featured artists including Alvin Slaughter and Donnie McClurkin from the US, and the Chorale Devine de Merveilles of the Republic of the Congo. The 2013 edition was attended by Bishop Oyedepo of Living Faith Church Worldwide (Winners' Chapel) and human rights activist Rev. Jesse Jackson, and featured the National Choir of the Federation of St. Kitts and Nevis, international singers like Lionel Peterson and Israel Houghton, and Nigerian singers including Bongos Ikwue, Frank Edwards, Nathaniel Bassey, Aity Dennis Inyang, el Mafrex, Freke Umoh, and Fadabasi.

=== 2014 edition ===
The 2014 event broke a Guinness World Record to become the "Largest Assembly of Carol Singers on the Face of the Earth". In attendance were Don Moen, international gospel music composer, and Cardinal John Onaiyekan of Abuja Catholic Diocese. The event featured special performances by Quartets from the five international choirs that performed in past editions. Also performing were gospel saxophonist Angela Christie, Lionel Peterson, Sinach, Harmonious Chorale and many more. The news of the world record was announced to the people of Akwa Ibom by the governor, Godswill Akpabio. In his speech he said "This month, we broke The Guinness Book of World Records, for the largest number of carol singers ever in the world. This momentous feat was achieved when Akwa Ibom people drawn from all the nooks and crannies of the state came together in the spirit of love and brotherhood. I believe that if we imbibe the virtue of love and stand together in brotherhood in the New Year, we would keep setting records and the walls of division, which have been erected by some selfish politicians, would tumble down."

=== 2016 edition ===
In 2016, the Akwa Ibom State Government organized the concert again on December 17, 2016. With guest artists from around the world, such as award winning gospel singer Don Moen, PRM band, The Kayamba Africa Choral Ensemble and Kenya Boys Choir. Local artists from Nigeria, such as Sammie Okposo, Buchi, Steve Crown, Elijah Oyelade, Rev. Fr. Patrick Edet, Esther Edoho, Julius Nglass and Perfecta Ekpo were also in attendance.

=== 2017 Edition ===
In 2017, Akwa Ibom State hosted musicians both within and outside the State during the Christmas festivities which was known as a Christmas groove and was tagged "Ukap'isua". This event took place on December 26 and 27 in Uyo. Among the people present at the event were musicians such as Wizkid, 'African Queen' crooner, 2face and Mavin Records first lady, Tiwa Savage. Victor Antai, state Commissioner for Culture and Tourism, also said that the event will features like musical concerts, dance party and beach competitions.

The main carols took place on December 28, 2017, with about 10 million People from 45 countries over the world to be part of the event. The official theme for the 2017 Christmas carol was Emmanuel: 'God With Us'. Addressing the public the Commissioner for Information and Strategy, Mr. Charles Udoh, said that gospel artistes to feature in the event include Bob Fitts, Ron Kenoly and 10 others from within and outside Africa and the 5,000 choristers across the 31 Local government of the state.

=== 2018 edition ===
In 2018, at the Akwa Ibom State Carols Festival, Aity Dennis was among the ministers who graced that event. She performed after the gospel music minister sensation, Mercy Chinwo, and before American import, Nicole Mullen Aity performed her prophetic song at the Uyo Township Stadium, she sang, danced and prophesied a glorious future for Akwa Ibom state and Nigeria.

Aity spoke after the event, saying: "It's always a big pleasure every time I have a performance in my home state. I am also glad I had the opportunity to perform the theme song. Let the People Say Amen!. She congratulate the Governor, Mr. Udom Emmanuel and the coordinator of the carol for a successful event."

=== 2019 edition ===
In 2019, the theme of the carol was "Only God". During his speech at the carol, the governor of Akwa Ibom State, Udom Emmanuel said that the state has every reason to be thankful to God for making them enjoy significant peace irrespective of all their challenges. Some significant appearances at the 2019 carol includes, Pastor Enoch Adeboye, the General Overseer of the redeemed Christian Church of God, Bishop Hezekiah Walker, Panam Percy Paul, Nathaniel Bassey and Prospa Ochimana.

=== 2020 edition ===
In 2020, the Carol was cancelled due to the outbreak of coronavirus in the country. The cancellation is in line with the WHO directive to ensure compliance of social distancing and avoidance of large crowds due to the outbreak of the virus. The cancellation was announced by the commissioner of culture and tourism, Mr. Orman Esin in Uyo.

=== 2021 edition ===
In 2021, the carol returned with the theme "The Return". The event held at the Ibom hall field and It was a time of celebration after the long break due to the COVID-19 restrictions. Significant appearances in the 2021 edition includes Bishop T.D. Jakes, Pastor Enoch Adeboye, Ada Ehi, Dunsin Oyekan and Tim Godfrey.

=== 2022 edition ===
In 2022, the Ibom Carol took place at Ibom Hall Arena, Uyo, on Friday, December 16, 2022. The theme of the Carol was "Go Forward". Highlights of the event was the presentation of the maiden Emmanuel Award and a cheque of $10,000 for Excellence in Gospel Music to singer, Nathaniel Bassey, by the governor, Udom Emmanuel. Another Award recipient was Aniekpeno Mkpanang, who received the Excellence in Service Award, he is the organizer of the Akwa Ibom Christmas Carol Festival.

=== 2023 edition ===
In 2023, the Ibom Carol which was the 16th edition, with the theme: "Arise, Shine; for thy, light is come", It was held at Unity park, Uyo, the theme was drawn from Isaiah 60:1-3.

=== 2024 edition ===
The 17th edition of the Akwa Ibom Christmas Carols Festival took place on December 13, 2024, at Uyo Christmas Village. The 2024 carols were tagged "Christmas Unplugged" and included gospel artists and other musicians such as Timaya, and many indigenous artists from the state.

== Gallery ==
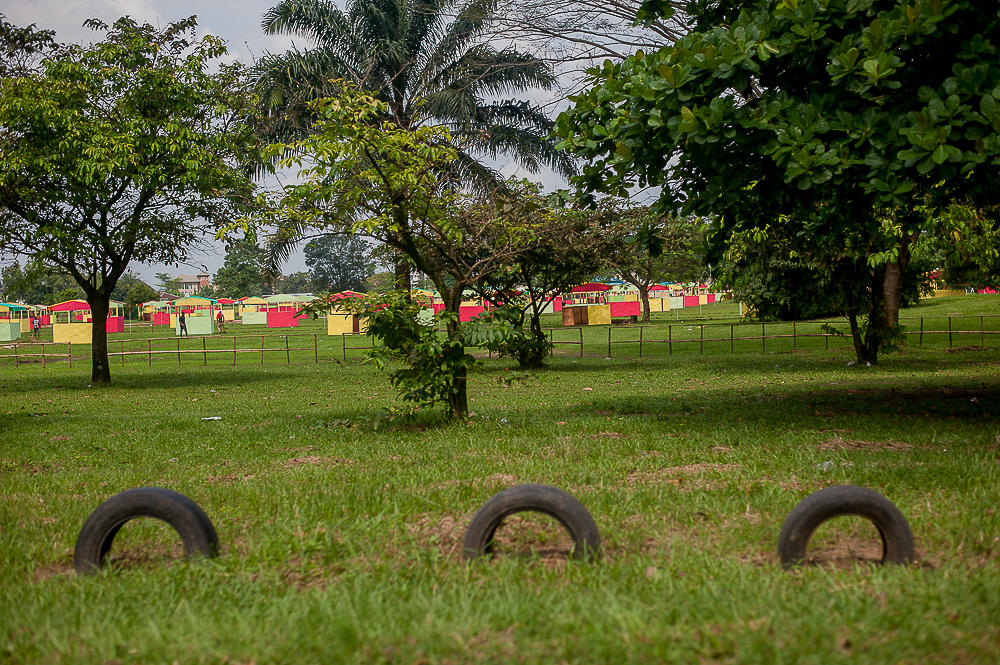
2021 event grounds

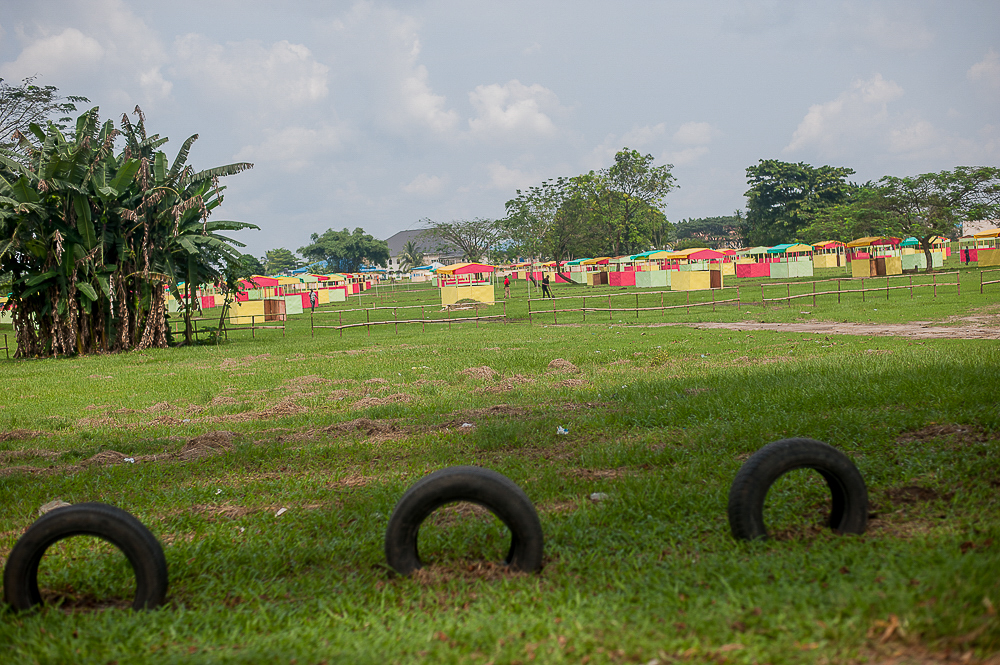
2021 event grounds
