= Chijioke Akuneto =

Nigerian football player

Personal information
- Date of birth: 10 October 1997 (age 29)
- Position: Midfielder

Team information
- Current team: Rivers United

Senior career*
Years	Team	Apps	(Gls)
–2019	MFM F.C.		
2019–2020	Sunshine Stars F.C.		
2020–2021	Heartland FC	24	(5)
2021–2022	Rivers United	36	(19)
2023-	Enyimba FC		
- * Club domestic league appearances and goals as of 00:15, 30 October 2022 (UTC)

Chijioke Akuneto (born 10 October 1997) is a Nigerian footballer who plays for Enyimba F.C. in the Nigerian Professional Football League. He was the league’s top goalscorer in the 2021– 22 season whilst playing for Rivers United.

== Club career ==
Akuneto played for Lagos-based MFM F.C. in the Nigeria Professional Football League in 2019 and scored four goals in his first thirteen games. In August 2019 he was signed by Sunshine Stars.

Akuneto played for Heartland FC during the 2020-21 Nigeria Professional Football League season and he scored five goals and was also credited with an assist from his 24 league games.

After joining Rivers United, in March 2022 he scored the first hat-trick of the entire 2021–22 Nigeria Professional Football League season. Akuneto would ultimately go on to score 19 goals during the 2021–22 campaign, making him comfortably the league’s top scorer, three goals clear of any rivals.

In March 2023 he was announced as signing for Enyimba F.C. under coach Finidi George.

== International career ==
In July 2022 he was called into the Nigerian squad for the 2022 African Nations Championship qualification matches against Ghana played in August and September 2022. After a 3-1 first league defeat, Akuneto scored his first goal in a Nigerian shirt in the 94th minute of the second leg to secure the match 2-0 and send the tie to a penalty shoot-out, which Ghana won.

== Personal life ==
Akuneto dedicated a goal he scored on 1 April 2019 for MFM F.C. to the newborn child he and his wife Temitope had lost in the previous 24 hours. He stated he had only played in the match on his wife’s wishes.

== Honours ==
Rivers United

- Nigeria Professional Football League: 2021-2022.
- NPFL Eunisell golden boot award: 2021–2022.
