= Bako Kontagora Stadium =

Sports venue in Minna, Nigeria

- Interactive map of Bako Kontagora Stadium
- Address: Minna; Nigeria
- Coordinates: 9°37′18″N 6°32′57″E
- Capacity: 5,000

Tenant
- Niger Tornadoes

Bako Kontagora Stadium, also known as Minna Township Stadium, is a 5,000-capacity multi-use stadium in Minna, Nigeria. It is currently used mostly for football matches. It is the home of the Niger Tornadoes. In the 2017-18 edition of the NPFL, the Niger Tornadoes drew an average home attendance of 4,300 at the Bako Kontagora Stadium.

Niger State is in the planning stages of expanding the Bako Kontagora Stadium capacity to 30,000, however, since the stadium is in the middle of the town with houses built around all sides of the stadium, there is little space for expansion.
