= Akwa Ibom Christmas Village =

Christmas park in Akwa Ibom, Nigeria

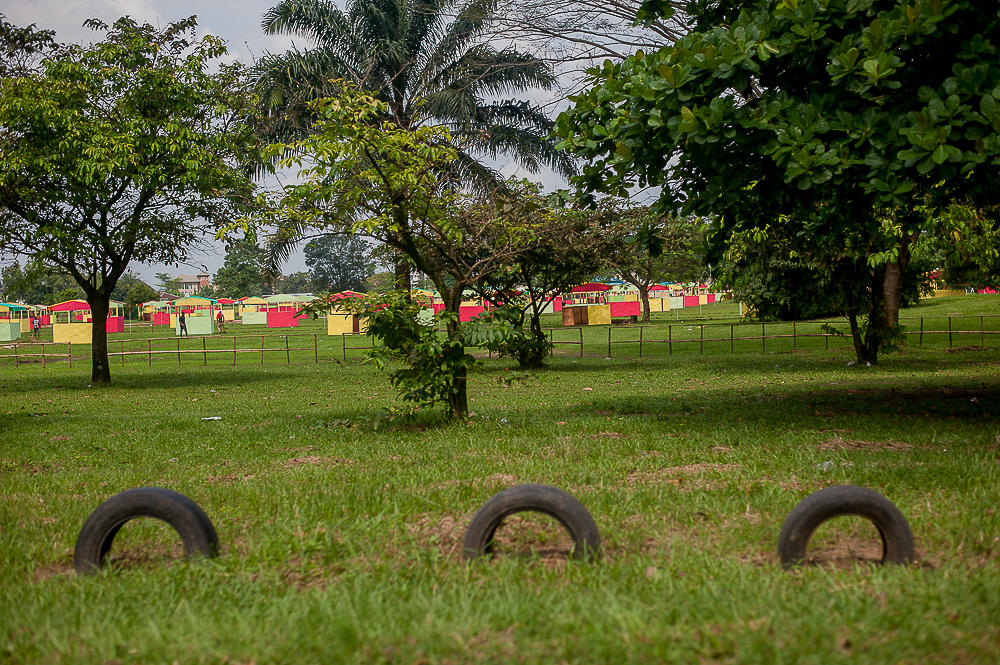

Akwa Ibom State Christmas Village is an annual holiday market event in Unity Park, Udo Udoma Avenue in Akwa Ibom State, Nigeria.

== Background ==
It is usually set up in December and terminates around early January. The festival includes activities ranging from presentations from dance groups, service of different delicacies, and networking b fun-seeking lovers.

== Activities ==
Some activities that goes on at the Akwa Ibom State Christmas Village includes but not limited to:

- Music
- Drama
- Comedy
- Games
- Cultural Display
- Outdoor Catering
- Talent Shows.

One important event that also occurs is the Akwa Ibom State Christmas Unplugged

== Inauguration ==
The Christmas Village was inaugurated by Governor Udom Emmanuel in 2020, and since then, it has been a place of activities for the indigenes and visitors during the festive period.

Recently, the governor of Akwa Ibom State, Pastor Umo Eno included Happy Hour Freebies to the Christmas celebration at the park, and changed the name from Christmas Village to Christmas Park.

The Governor of the State, Pastor Umo Bassey Eno hosted the 2023 Christmas Carol festival in the Christmas Park.
