= Ezekiel Bassey =

Nigerian footballer

Personal information
- Full name: Ezekiel Joseph Bassey
- Date of birth: 10 November 1996 (age 30)
- Place of birth: Akwa Ibom, Nigeria
- Height: 1.70 m (5 ft 7 in)
- Position: Winger

Senior career*
Years	Team	Apps	(Gls)
2009–2013	Akwa Starlet	16	(7)
2013–2014	Akwa United	30	(10)
2014–2017	Enyimba	71	(14)
2017	→ Barcelona B (loan)	0	(0)
2017–2018	Paykan	3	(0)
2018–2019	Akwa United	12	(7)
2019	Al Masry	2	(0)
2019–2020	Petrojet SC	20	(4)
2021-2023	Akwa United		

International career^{‡}
2015	Nigeria	4	(0)
- * Club domestic league appearances and goals as of 15:22, 30 March 2020 (UTC) ‡ National team caps and goals as of 1 February 2017

Ezekiel Joe Bassey (born 10 November 1996) is a Nigerian professional footballer who plays as a winger. He is a pacey winger, known for his good dribbling ability and very high work rate.

== Club career ==
=== Early career ===
Born in Akwa Ibom, Bassey started his career with Akwa Starlet.

=== Akwa United ===
Bassey signed with Akwa United for the 2013-2014 season.

=== Enyimba ===
Recruited by Enyimba's team of scouts at the start of the 2014-2015 season, Bassey already had a reputation as one of the league's rising stars. He finished his first season for the club with 3 goals and over 10 assists in the league to drive Enyimba to their seventh title.

=== Barcelona B (loan) ===
Following the NPFL All-Star tour of La Liga in 2016, he was scouted by Barcelona and subsequently secured a loan to the B team from his home club of Enyimba FC. Ezekiel Bassey joined Barcelona B on transfer deadline day, 31 January 2017. His deal has the option of being made permanent at the end of the loan.

=== Paykan ===
On 20 September 2017, Bassey signed a contract with Paykan. He made three league appearances at the club.

=== Akwa United ===
Bassey rejoined Akwa United on a year deal in 2018 after a short spell with Paykan.

=== Al Masry SC ===
On 21 January 2019, it was announced that Bassey had joined Egyptian club Al Masry SC on a three-year deal.

=== Petrojet SC ===
With just few months of joining Al Masry SC, Bassey drew the attention of some clubs and he received a lot of offers but he opted to joined Egyptian club Petrojet SC on a year deal in July 2019.

== International career ==
He made his debut for the full Nigeria national team on 17 November 2015 in the CAF World Cup Qualifier against Swaziland. He would also play in the African Nations Championship against Tunisia in January 2016.

== Honours ==
Enyimba International

- Nigerian Premier League: 2015
- Nigerian FA Cup: 2014

Individual

- Player of the Season Award: 2013–14
