= Matthew Etim =

Nigerian footballer

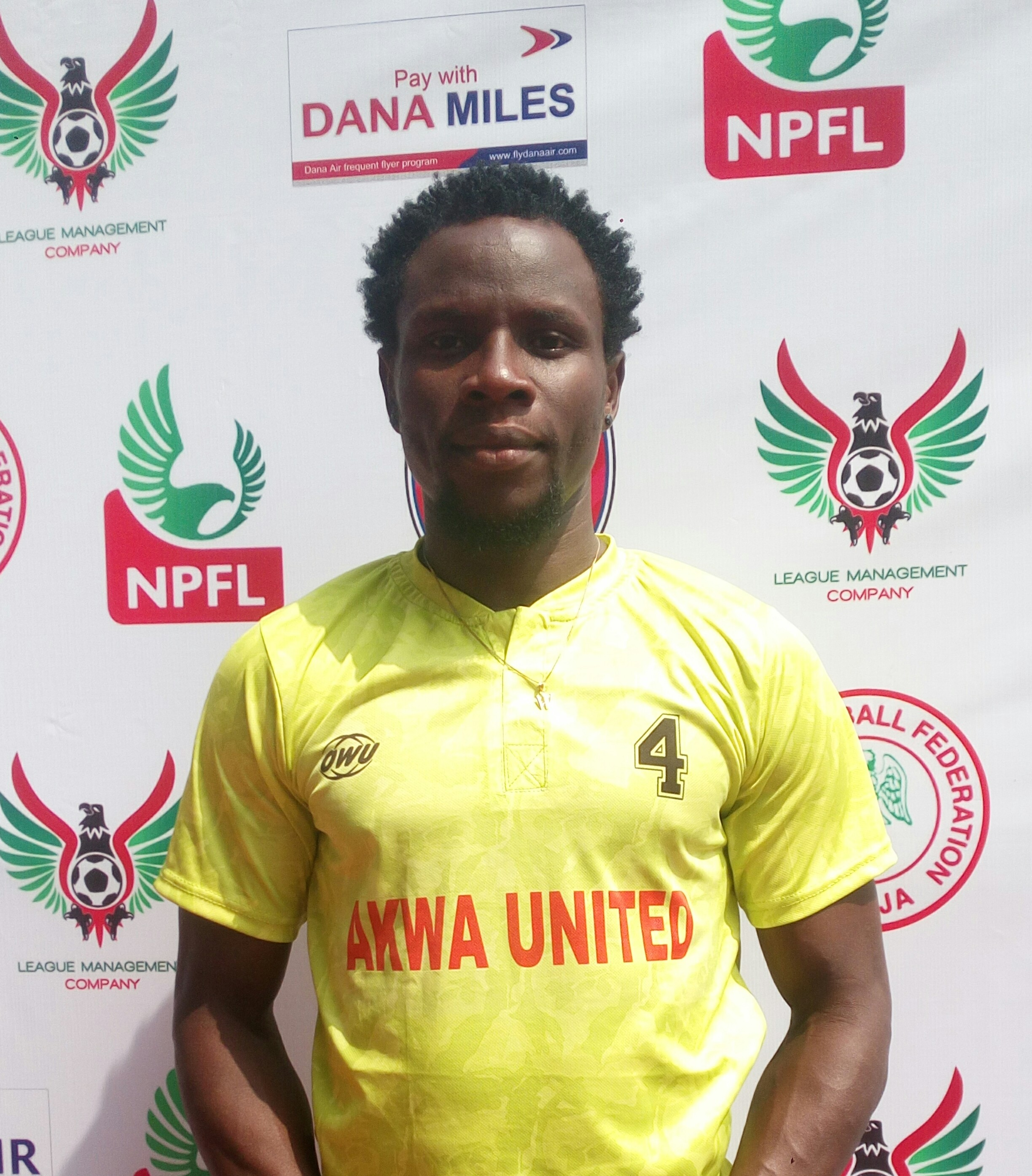
- Etim with Akwa United

Personal information
- Date of birth: 2 September 1989 (age 37)
- Place of birth: Eket, Akwa Ibom, Nigeria
- Height: 1.69 m (5 ft 7 in)
- Position: Right-back

Team information
- Current team: Akwa United
- Number: 4

Senior career*
Years	Team	Apps	(Gls)
2010–2012	Kaduna United	0	(0)
2012–2017	Enugu Rangers	0	(0)
2017–2018	Akwa United	18	(0)
2018–2019	Akwa United	6	(0)

International career^{‡}
2016	CHAN Eagles	3	(0)
- * Club domestic league appearances and goals as of 18 April 2019 ‡ National team caps and goals as of 18 April 2019

Matthew Etim (born 2 September 1989), is a Nigerian professional footballer who plays as a right-back for Akwa United in the NPFL.

== Club career ==
Etim made his league debut in the NPFL in the 2010—11 season with Kaduna United.

He left Kaduna United after two seasons (2010 to 2012) and joined seven-time NPFL champions, Enugu Rangers, where he spent five seasons (2012 to 2017).

Etim won the 2016 Nigeria Professional Football League title with Enugu Rangers.

During the summer of 2016, Etim featured for NPFL All-stars in the tour of Spain. On 10 August 2016, he suffered a strain on his left foot in the 2–1 loss to Valencia CF at the Alzira Stadium.

The injury ruled him out of the rest of the tour, and his place was taken by Ifeanyi Nweke in subsequent matches - against Atlético Madrid and Málaga CF.

Matthew Etim joined Uyo-based club, Akwa United from Enugu Rangers on a one-year deal in December 2017, with an option for an extension.

He was unveiled at the Godswill Akpabio International Stadium on 6 January 2018.

He took over the team's no. 4 jersey from Alhassan Ibrahim, after the former Nigeria national under-20 football team player moved to FK Austria Wien.

== International career ==
Etim made his debut in the 4–1 win over Niger in a Group C matchday one tie at the 2016 African Nations Championship on 18 January 2016. He played from start to finish.

The defender went on to star the whole duration of the 1–1 draw against Tunisia and 1–0 loss to Guinea in the second and third group matches respectively, as Nigeria failed to advance to the knockout stages.

== Club honours ==
Enugu Rangers

- Nigeria Professional Football League: 2016
