= Samod Kadiri =

Nigerian footballer (born 1995)

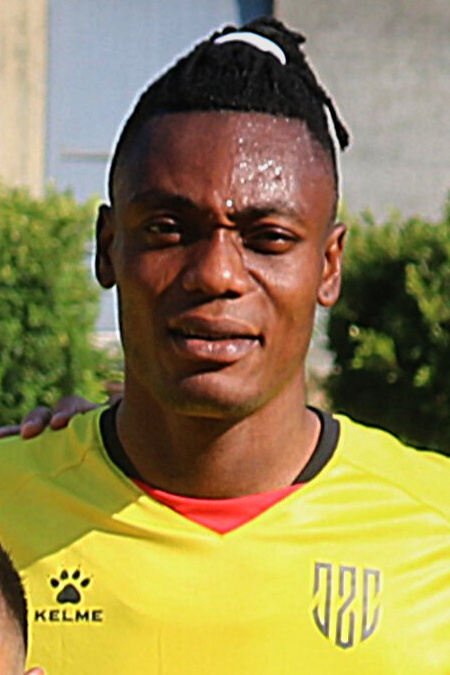
- Kadiri with Ahed in 2022

Personal information
- Full name: Samod Timileyin Kadiri
- Date of birth: 8 September 1995 (age 31)
- Position: Forward

Senior career*
Years	Team	Apps	(Gls)
2015–2016	Bayelsa United		
2016–2017	Sunshine Stars		
2017–2020	Lobi Stars		
2020–2021	Enyimba		
2021–2022	Kwara United		
2022	Ahed	8	(3)
2023	Kwara United		
2023	Remo Stars		
2024–2025	Shabab Sahel	27	(15)
- * Club domestic league appearances and goals as of 17 January 2024

Samod Timileyin Kadiri (born 8 September 1995) is a Nigerian professional footballer who plays as a forward.

== Club career ==
Kadiri played for Bayelsa United and Sunshine Stars in the Nigeria Professional Football League.

== International career ==
In 2018, Kadiri played for a Nigeria XI team in the first half of a friendly match against Atlético Madrid.

== Honours ==
Ahed

- Lebanese Premier League: 2022–23
- Lebanese Elite Cup: 2022
- Lebanese FA Cup runner-up: 2022–23
