= Chibundu Amah =

Nigerian footballer

Personal information
- Full name: Chibundu Amah
- Place of birth: Nigeria
- Position: Striker

Team information
- Current team: Heartland fc

Senior career*
Years	Team	Apps	(Gls)
2019–	Heartland fc		

International career
2019–	Nigeria U23		
- * Club domestic league appearances and goals

Chibundu Amah is a professional football player for Heartland F.C of Owerri a first tier football club in Nigeria.

== Early life ==
Amah was born in Umuahia, Abia State. There, he attended Williams Memorial Junior and Senior Secondary Schools.

== Club career ==
=== Sunshine United ===
Amah became famous for his outstanding performance against Lobi Stars netting a hat trick for the inconsistent Akure based

He became the first player to score a hat trick that season.

=== 2019 - Heartland FC ===
Amah Chibundu joined Heartland FC from Sunshine United in an undisclosed fee after a superb season with the Owena Whales.

He opened his scoring account for Heartland FC of Owerri against plateau United. He also scored the lone goal for Heartland against Lobi Star.
