= Kennedy Boboye =

Nigerian footballer

Personal information
- Date of birth: 1 January 1974 (age 52)
- Place of birth: Nigeria
- Position: Forward

Senior career*
Years	Team	Apps	(Gls)
–1993	Sharks		
1993–1994	Udoji United		
1998–1999	SV Straelen		
1999–2000	KFC Uerdingen	2+	(0+)
2003–2004	Manning Rangers		

Managerial career
- 2015: Sunshine Stars
- 2015–2016: Abia Warriors
- 2016–2018: Plateau United
- 2019: Remo Stars
- 2019–2022: Akwa United
- 2023–2024: Heartland
- * Club domestic league appearances and goals

Kennedy Boboye (born 1 January 1974) is a Nigerian football manager and former player.

== Playing career ==
Boboye started his career with Nigerian second tier side Sharks. In 1998, he signed for SV Straelen in the German fourth tier. In 1999, he signed for German third tier club KFC Uerdingen. In 2003, he signed for Manning Rangers in South Africa.

== Managerial career ==
In 2016, Boboye was appointed manager of Nigerian team Plateau United, helping them win their only top flight title. In 2019, he was appointed manager of Akwa United in Nigeria, and also helped them to win their first-ever top flight title.
