= Kogi United F.C. =

Nigerian football club

- Ground: Confluence Stadium, Lokoja
- Capacity: 25,000
- Chairman: Abdulmalik Isah
- Manager: Folabi Ojekunle
- League: Nigeria National League
- Website: http://www.kogiunitedfc.com/

Kogi United is a Nigerian football club that play in the second-tier division in Nigerian football, the Nigeria National League. They use the 25,000-capacity Lokoja Confluence Stadium for their home games. Hummel is their kits sponsor.

They were banned from the Nigeria Federation Cup for two seasons after crowd invaded the pitch in a 2017 First Round game against Enugu Rangers, their first-ever home game in the cup.

== Current squad ==
Note: Flags indicate national team as defined under FIFA eligibility rules; some limited exceptions apply. Players may hold more than one non-FIFA nationality.

No.	Pos.	Nation	Player
16	GK	NGA	Detan Ogundare
39		NGA	Idris Muye
3		NGA	Iwuji Kingsley
26		NGA	Victor Tale
15		NGA	Tenimu Abubakar
30		NGA	Stephen Musa
28		NGA	Osas Eghe
17		NGA	Bolaji Micheal
35	FW	NGA	John Jerome

No.	Pos.	Nation	Player
10		NGA	John Onuh John
13	FW	NGA	Mayaki Ismail
22		NGA	Jatau Joseph
22		NGA	Bashir Chatto
26		NGA	Danlami Abubakar
29		NGA	Musa Jatau
8		NGA	Nelson Okwa
9		NGA	Tanko Salisu
19	FW	NGA	Musa Jatau
