= Godswill Akpabio International Stadium =

Sports venue in Uyo, Nigeria

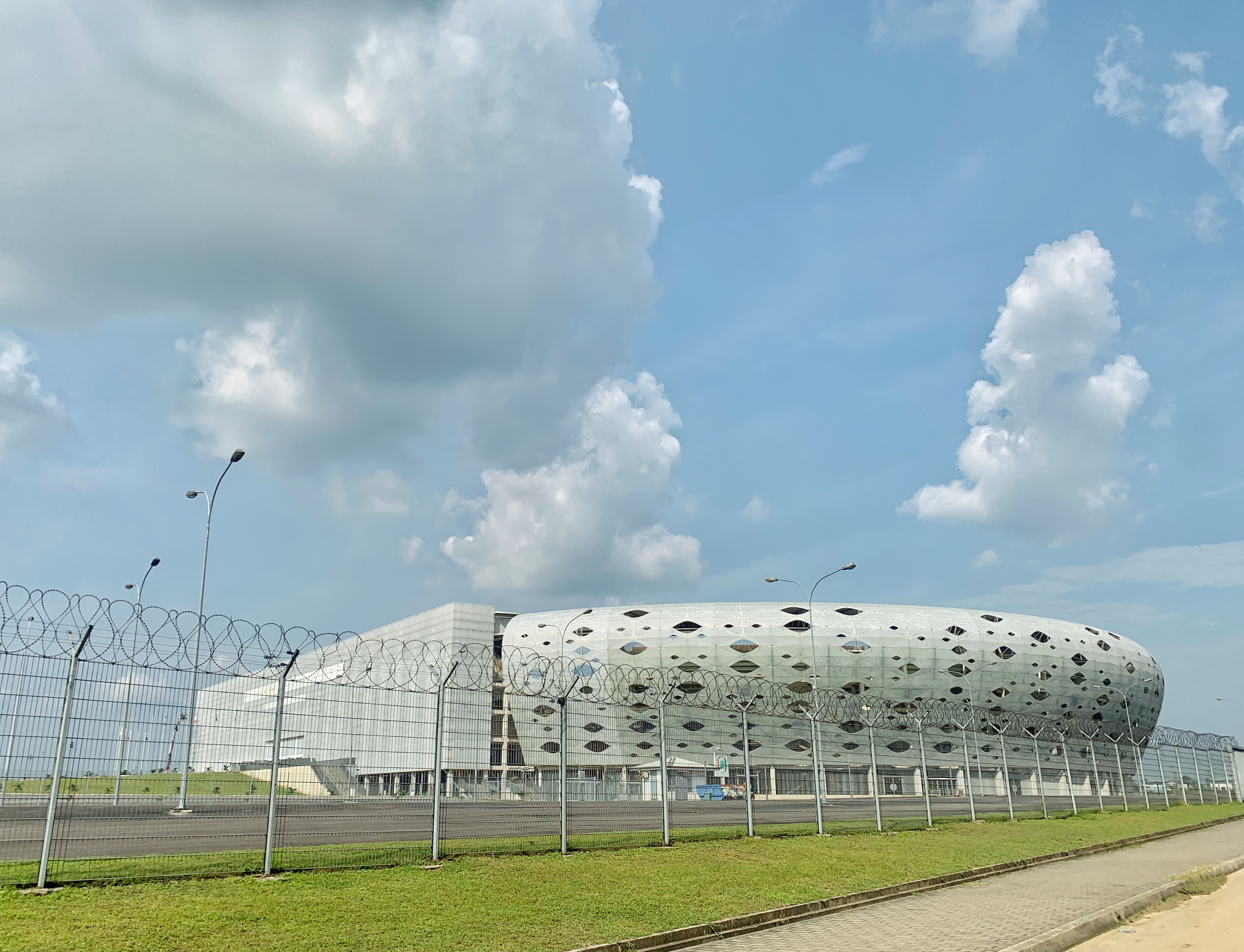
- Interactive map of Godswill Akpabio International Stadium
- Full name: Godswill Akpabio International Stadium
- Location: Uyo, Akwa Ibom, Nigeria
- Capacity: 30,000 (football)
- Surface: Grass

Construction
- Groundbreaking: 2012
- Built: 2012-2014
- Opened: 7 November 2014; 11 years ago
- Cost: $96 million
- Architect: Julius Berger

Tenants
- Akwa United F.C. (2014–present); Nigeria national football team (selected matches)

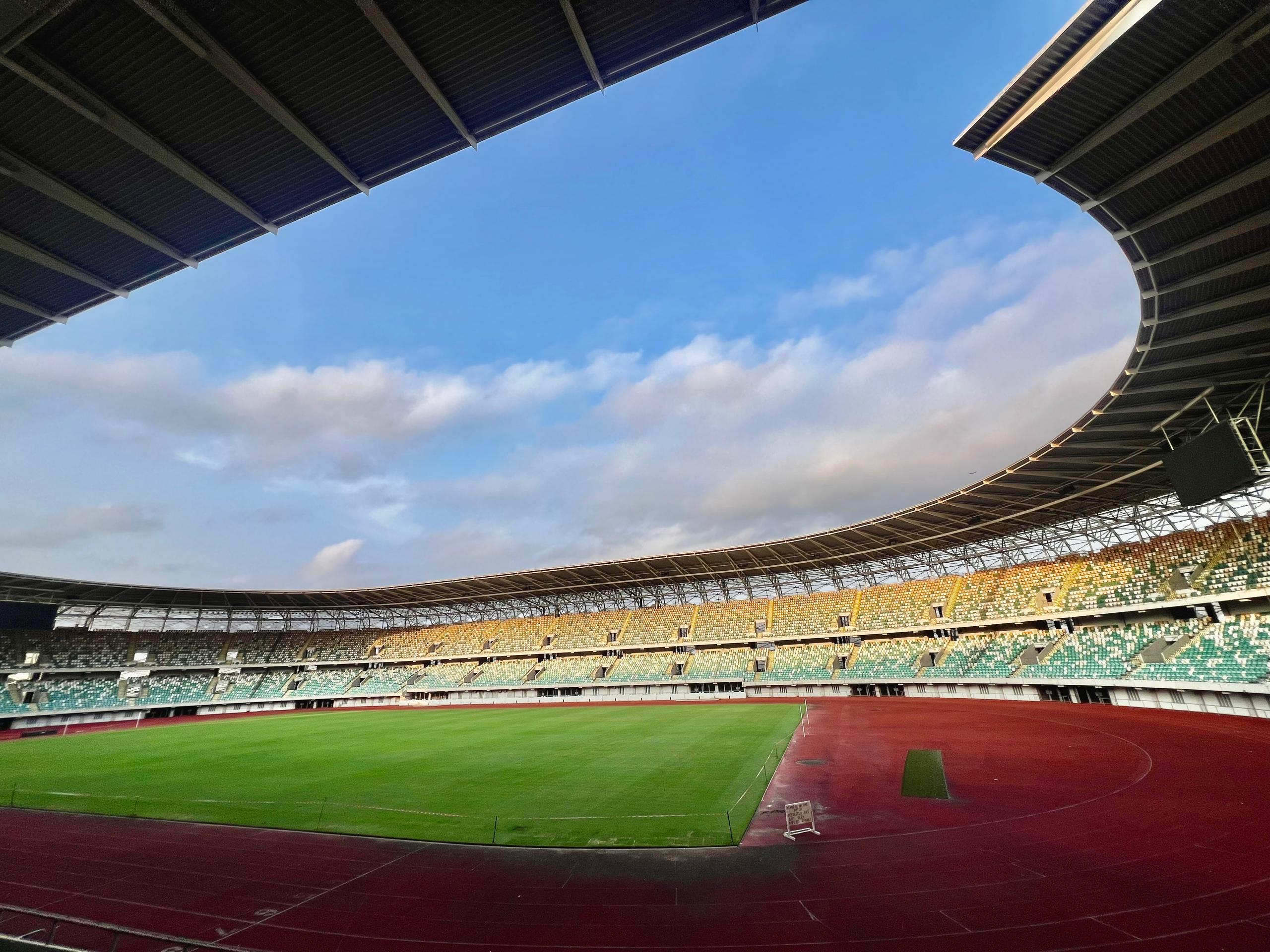
The interior of the Godswill Akpabio International Stadium.

The Godswill Akpabio International Stadium (formerly Akwa Ibom International Stadium) is a 30,000 capacity national sports stadium located in Uyo, the state capital of Akwa Ibom. The stadium serves as a home to the 'Super Eagles' of Nigeria as well as a center for various social, cultural, political and religious events. The contract for the construction of the Akwa Ibom International Stadium complex and Games Village was awarded in 2012 to Julius Berger and was completed in 2014. The 30,000 seater ultra modern multipurpose sports complex was modeled after Allianz Arena.

Governor Udom Gabriel Emmanuel renamed Akwa Ibom Stadium as Godswill Obot Akpabio International Stadium, immediately following his inauguration ceremony on May 29, 2015, in the stadium. Godswill Akpabio was the immediate past governor of the state.

== Construction and Architecture ==
The contract for the design of the stadium was awarded to Julius Berger a structural engineering firm based in Nigeria. They were responsible for the architectural design, execution planning, constructional supervision, as well as maintenance of the stadium. The stadium which seats on 48 hectares (120 acres) of land has some unique features such as bullet proof VIP/VVIP sections, collapsible seats, two digital score boards, digital playback screens, digital flood lights, and 30 emergency exits.

== Structure ==
The stadium structure is in two phases which includes a 400m-running track for athletic events, and is the pilot part of Uyo Sports Park development, and is enclosed by a white triangular-shaped outer covering that encircles the whole spectator stand. The East Stand and Curves can seat approximately 22,500 people. The Governors’ Lounge has sitting capacity for between 30 and 40 VVIPs and is located in the Grand Stand on Level Two. It is constructed to carry little more than 30,000 spectators whether for soccer or track and field events, while the Grand Stand can comfortably accommodate about 7,500 spectators, including the VIP/VVIPs. There is also a six-lane track built specifically for athletes to train.

== Facilities ==
The Stadium itself consists of:

- 30,000 capacity covered main bowl
- Bullet Proof VVIP/VIP areas
- Box office
- Media facilities
- Two scoreboards that comprise electronic scoreboard and video facilities for replays
- Floodlights
- Eight-lane 400m standard track
- Warm-up facility with six-lane 400m track
- A standby power supply system
- 30 emergency exit points
- 7,500 seater Grand Stand
- Helipad
- Two dressing rooms
- Ambulance bay

The Godswill Akpabio International Stadium meets the requirements of the International safety standards; it is equipped with emergency service units (to enable exit within 6 minutes), closed circuit security cameras as well as crowd control steel fencing. There are also stand-by fire fighting equipment and metal detectors which have been put in place to avoid any misfortunes. The stadium has been slated to host the African Cup Of Nations (AFCON) qualifying series against South Africa on 17 November. Local team Akwa United moved into the stadium in 2015 when their ground was being brought up to code.

== See also ==
- Akwa Ibom Christmas Carols Festival
- List of stadiums in Nigeria
- Akwa Ibom State
- Lists of stadiums
