= Niger Tornadoes F.C. =

Nigerian football club

Niger Tornadoes
- Full name: Niger Tornadoes Football Club
- Nickname: Ikon Allah
- Founded: 1977; 49 years ago
- Ground: Bako Kontagora Stadium, Minna, Nigeria
- Capacity: 5,000
- Chairman: Hon. Juanchi Paul
- Manager: Kabiru Dogo
- League: Nigeria Professional Football League (NPFL)
- 2025—26: 14th of 20
Home colours

Niger Tornadoes Football Club is a football club based in Minna, Nigeria. They play in the Nigerian Professional Football League. Their home stadium is Bako Kontagora Stadium. They have also played their home games at Confluence Stadium in Lokoja.

== History ==
In 2005 they finished in the lower half of the Nigerian Premier League but avoided relegation by three points. The club has suffered financial difficulties, with players complaining of unpaid salaries and bonuses.

After a 0–3 start to the 2008–09 season the entire management was sacked. The replacements for the chairman (David Suleiman) and the manager (Danladi Nasidi) had the same positions at the club from 2004 to 2005 when they finished 13th and 14th in the Premier League. On November 15, the team hired Justin Tenger as technical adviser, a role he had until 2004.

They were relegated from the Premier League in 2012 on goal difference after scoring 38 goals in 36 games. Thirteen of the goals were scored by Sibi Gwar who was the league's top scorer. They won promotion again in 2015 after winning the Nigeria National League.

Niger Tornadoes were promoted back to the top division in 2015. Coach Abdullahi Biffo led them to a promotion spot which they clinched after defeating Mighty Jets F.C. 2–0. With two goals from their star forward, Joaco Seleme.

Niger Tornadoes were runners up in the Nigerian FA Cup in 2017 after losing on penalties to Akwa United.

The club was fined N1 million in 2019 for crowd troubles in a game against Bendel Insurance.

== Achievements ==
- Nigerian FA Cup: 1

2000

- National Second Division: 2

1996, 2015

== Performance in CAF competitions ==
- CAF Cup Winners' Cup: 1 appearance

2001 – Quarter-finals

- WAFU Club Championship: 1 appearance

2010 – Quarter-finals
