= Kwara United F.C. =

Professional football club in Nigeria

Kwara United
- Full name: Kwara United Football Club
- Nicknames: Harmony boys, The Afonja Warriors
- Founded: 1997; 29 years ago
- Ground: Kwara State Stadium; Ilorin, Kwara, Nigeria
- Capacity: 18,000
- Chairman: Kumbi Titiloye
- Manager: Tunde Sanni
- League: Nigeria Professional Football League
- 2025–26: 16th of 20
| Home colours | Away colours |

Kwara United Football Club is a Nigerian football club based in Ilorin. They play in the top division in Nigerian football, the Nigeria Professional football League having gained promotion in 2017 from the Nigeria National League. Their home stadium is the Kwara State Stadium.

== History ==
The club's roots go back to the Kwara State Water Corporation Football Club in 1974. It was supposed to be an in-house club for the staffers of the Water Corporation. Due to the results and depth of talent in the club, the scope was widened and by 1979 they qualified to play in the National League second division alongside the First Bank F.C. of Lagos. That same year, the club got to the quarter-final stage of the Football Association Cup (otherwise called the Challenge Cup) where it lost to Bendel Insurance football club of Benin 2–1. In 1985, due to the change in the name of the parent corporation to Kwara Utility Board, the club changed its name to Kwara Utility Bombers of Ilorin. It was relegated to division three at the end of that season. With the disengagement of the parent corporation from financing the team in 1990, the club adjusted its name to Kwara Bombers football club of Ilorin. It suffered financial stress, which culminated in its relegation to division three in 1996. The new state government led by Colonel Peter Asum Ogar led the purchase in March 1997 of the Exide Club of Ibadan, moved them to Ilorin and took their slot in the Second Division. Ogar christened the new outfit Kwara United Football Club of Ilorin.

The club came third at the end of the 2006 Super Four play-off behind Ocean Boys and Nasarawa United FC and qualified for the 2007 edition of the CAF Confederation Cup.

The coaching staff for the 2006–07 season included Swedes Roger Palmgren and Johan Eriksson (son of former England and Mexico manager, Sven-Göran Eriksson). The team was coached by former players of the team: Toyin Ayinla, Tunde Sanni and Aliyu Muzambilu (Goalkeeper trainer) following the passing of Technical Adviser Kafaru Alabi on January 8, 2008. However, they were relegated from the Premier League on the last day of the 2007–08 season on goals differential. They regained promotion back to the top level the next year as Champions of Division 1-A. The team appointed an Investment Consultant, Goldenwing33 Nigeria Limited, headed by former Nigerian international and former deputy editor (Sports) of Thisday newspaper, Olajide Ayodeji Fashikun. The Investment Consultant was to organise the privatisation and private sector participation in the club's funding in two years. The fans of the club have one of the worst reputations in Nigeria, as witnessed during a vicious beating of the referees after a 0–0 tie in 2008. Kwara played some of the 2010–11 season in Offa and Abeokuta as their own ground was being renovated. After relegation in 2013 they won promotion back in 2014. After their last game with Ranchers Bees was abandoned in Kaduna with 28 minutes to play tied at 2–2, they played again at a neutral site with Kwara needing the win and three points to leapfrog Ranchers for promotion. The replay was again abandoned when Bees' players attacked the referee and team staff encroached on the field. The League ruled Bees at fault, fined the club and awarded the win to Kwara United, thus securing the promotion.

Kwara United returned to the top-flight in 2019 when they bought Delta Force's slot in the NPFL after having previously been relegated; and the club enjoyed considerable success between then and 2023, when they qualified for the CAF Confederation Cup in 2022 after narrowly missing out previously, in a period which featured notable players like Afeez Nosiru.

On 28 June 2025, Kwara United won their first ever title after defeating Abakaliki FC at the Federation Cup.

=== Farm club ===
The club is owner of Kwara United Feeders Team of Ilorin and a female team, Kwara Ladies.

== Club names ==
- 1974–85: Kwara Water Corporation football club
- 1985–90: Kwara Utility Bombers of Ilorin
- 1990–97: Kwara Bombers Football Club of Ilorin
- 1997–: Kwara United Football Club of Ilorin (after the Kwara State government bought Exide Sparkers Football Club of Ibadan and renamed the team)

== Performance in CAF competitions ==
- CAF Confederation Cup: 2 appearances

2007 – Group stage
2022/23 – Second round

- CAF Cup: 1 appearance

1999 – Quarter-finals

== Former coaches ==
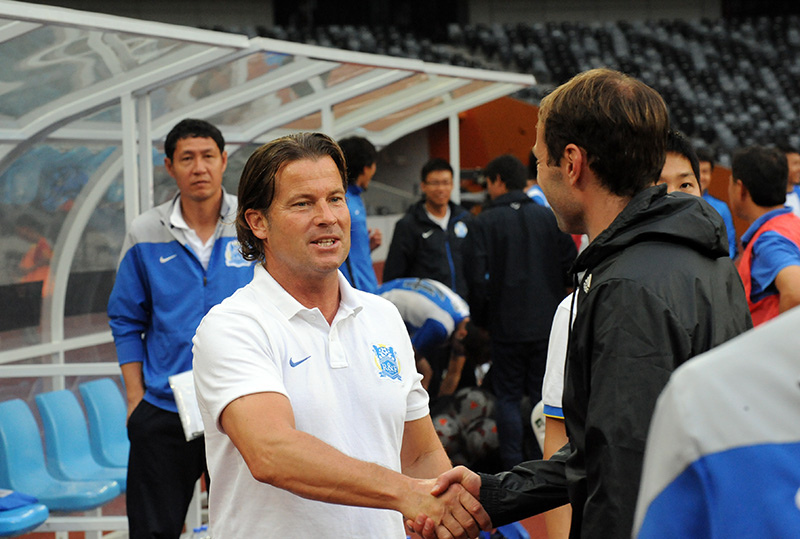
Roger Palmgren, here in a white shirt, managed Kwara United in the 2000s

- (Nigeria) Kafaru Alabi
- (Nigeria) Toyin Ayinla
- (Sweden) Johann Eriksson
- (Serbia) Kosta Papić
- (Sweden) Roger Palmgren (2006–07)
- (Nigeria) Kadiri Ikhana (1997), (2010–11)
- (Nigeria) Tunde Sanni (2011–12)
- (Nigeria) Samson Unuanel (2012–13), (2013–14)
- (Nigeria) Babatunde Abdulrahmon (2014–2015)
- (Nigeria) John Sam Obuh (2015–2017)
- (Nigeria) Abubakar Bala (2017–2019)
- (Nigeria) Abdullahi Biffo (2019–2022)
- (Nigeria) Abdulazeez Mohammed (2022–2023)
- (Nigeria) Kabir Dogo (2023–2024)
- (Nigeria) Tunde Sanni (2024–2025)
- (Nigeria) Suleiman Ashifat (2025-present)

== Honours ==
- Nigeria Federation Cup: (1)

2025

- Nigerian Premier League:

2006 Regular Season champions, 3rd in Super Four Play-off

- National Second Division: (1)

1997
