= 2014–15 Linafoot =

Linafoot
- Season: 2014–15
- Matches: 112
- Goals: 223 (1.99 per match)
- Biggest home win: TP Mazembe 7-0 Bantous (5 October 2014)
- Biggest away win: Rojolu 0-5 V.Club (30 November 2014)
- Highest scoring: TP Mazembe 7-0 Bantous

The 2014–15 Linafoot season (known as the Vodacom Superligue 2014–15 for sponsorship reasons) is the 54th since its establishment. It began on 4 October 2014. A total of 20 clubs participate in the 2014–15 Linafoot.

== Team summaries ==
Locations of teams in the 2014–15 Linafoot.
Blue: Group 1; Red: Group 2

=== Promotion and relegation ===
Due to the league's expansion from 16 to 20 clubs, no teams were relegated following the 2013–14 season. The four new entries into the league for this season are AS Bantous, AC Capaco, JS Groupe Bazano and RC Kinshasa.

=== Stadiums and locations ===
| Team | Location | Stadium | Stadium capacity |
|---|---|---|---|
| AS Bantous | Lubumbashi | Stade Frederic Kibassa Maliba | 35,000 |
| AC Capaco Beni | Beni | Stade Frederic Kibassa Maliba | 35,000 |
| AS Dauphins Noirs | Goma | Stade des Volcans | 9,000 |
| CS Don Bosco | Lubumbashi | Stade Frederic Kibassa Maliba | 35,000 |
| TC Elima | Boma | Stade SOCOL | 5,000 |
| FC MK Etanchéité | Kinshasa | Stade des Martyrs | 80,000 |
| JS Groupe Bazano | Lubumbashi | Stade Frederic Kibassa Maliba | 35,000 |
| Lubumbashi Sport | Lubumbashi | Stade Frederic Kibassa Maliba | 35,000 |
| AS Makiso | Kisangani | Stade Lumumba | 2,000 |
| Daring Club Motema Pembe | Kinshasa | Stade des Martyrs | 80,000 |
| OC Muungano | Bukavu | Stade de la Concorde | 5,000 |
| AS Nika | Kisangani | Stade Lumumba | 2,000 |
| RC Kinshasa | Kinshasa | Stade des Martyrs | 80,000 |
| AS Rojolu | Kinshasa | Stade des Martyrs | 80,000 |
| FC Saint Eloi Lupopo | Lubumbashi | Stade Frederic Kibassa Maliba | 35,000 |
| SM Sanga Balende | Mbuji-Mayi | Stade Tshikisha | 8,000 |
| Sharks XI F.C. | Kinshasa | Stade des Martyrs | 80,000 |
| TP Mazembe | Lubumbashi | Stade TP Mazembe | 18,500 |
| US Tshinkunku | Kananga | Stade des Jeunes | 10,000 |
| AS Vita Club | Kinshasa | Stade des Martyrs | 80,000 |

== Regular season ==
=== Group 1 ===
| Pos | Team | Pld | W | D | L | GF | GA | GD | Pts | Qualification or relegation |
|---|---|---|---|---|---|---|---|---|---|---|
| 1 | TP Mazembe | 9 | 6 | 2 | 1 | 19 | 5 | +14 | 20 | Championship Round |
| 2 | SM Sanga Balende | 9 | 6 | 1 | 2 | 9 | 4 | +5 | 19 | Championship Round |
| 3 | Lubumbashi Sport | 9 | 5 | 2 | 2 | 17 | 8 | +9 | 17 | Championship Round |
| 4 | FC Saint Eloi Lupopo | 9 | 4 | 4 | 1 | 11 | 3 | +8 | 16 | Championship Round |
| 5 | CS Don Bosco | 9 | 3 | 5 | 1 | 13 | 4 | +9 | 14 | Championship Round |
| 6 | OC Muungano | 9 | 3 | 2 | 4 | 6 | 5 | +1 | 11 | |
| 7 | AS Bantous | 9 | 3 | 2 | 4 | 7 | 15 | −8 | 11 | |
| 8 | US Tshinkunku | 9 | 2 | 2 | 5 | 5 | 10 | −5 | 8 | |
| 9 | AS Dauphins Noirs | 9 | 2 | 2 | 5 | 6 | 14 | −8 | 8 | Relegation |
| 10 | AC Capaco Beni | 9 | 0 | 0 | 9 | 1 | 26 | −25 | 0 | Relegation |

Updated to match(es) played on 4 January 2015. Source: Soccerway
Rules for classification: 1) points; 2) fewer games lost; 3) goal difference; 4) goals scored.

| Home \ Away | BAN | CAP | DAU | DON | LUB | MUU | SEL | SAN | TPM | TSH |
|---|---|---|---|---|---|---|---|---|---|---|
| Bantous | | 3–0 | 1–1 | | | 1–0 | | 0–1 | | 1–0 |
| Capaco | | | | 0–3 | | 1–2 | 0–3 | 0–3 | | |
| Dauphins Noirs | | 3–0 | | | | 0–3 | | 2–0 | 0–1 | 0–0 |
| Don Bosco | 4–0 | | 3–0 | | 1–1 | | | 1–1 | | |
| Lubumbashi Sport | 2–1 | 3–0 | 3–0 | | | | 1–2 | 1–0 | | 4–1 |
| Muungano | | | | 1–0 | 0–0 | | 0–0 | 0–1 | 0–1 | 0–1 |
| Saint Eloi Lupopo | 0–0 | | 3–0 | 0–0 | | | | 0–1 | 1–1 | 2–0 |
| Sanga Balende | | | | | | | | | 1–0 | 1–0 |
| TP Mazembe | 7–0 | 3–0 | | 1–1 | 3–2 | | | | | |
| Tshinkunku | | 3–0 | | 0–0 | | | | | 0–2 | |

Updated to match(es) played on 4 January 2014. Source: Soccerway
Legend: Blue = home team win; Yellow = draw; Red = away team win.

=== Group 2 ===
| Pos | Team | Pld | W | D | L | GF | GA | GD | Pts | Qualification or relegation |
|---|---|---|---|---|---|---|---|---|---|---|
| 1 | DC Motema Pembe | 9 | 7 | 1 | 1 | 12 | 5 | +7 | 22 | Championship Round |
| 2 | AS Vita Club | 8 | 7 | 0 | 1 | 16 | 2 | +14 | 21 | Championship Round |
| 3 | Sharks XI FC | 9 | 5 | 0 | 4 | 11 | 5 | +6 | 15 | Championship Round |
| 4 | FC MK Etanchéité | 9 | 3 | 5 | 1 | 7 | 4 | +3 | 14 | Championship Round |
| 5 | JS Groupe Bazano | 9 | 3 | 4 | 2 | 7 | 6 | +1 | 13 | Championship Round |
| 6 | RC Kinshasa | 9 | 3 | 3 | 3 | 7 | 8 | −1 | 12 | |
| 7 | CS Makiso | 8 | 2 | 2 | 4 | 7 | 8 | −1 | 8 | |
| 8 | SC Rojolu | 9 | 2 | 2 | 5 | 6 | 16 | −10 | 8 | |
| 9 | TC Elima | 9 | 2 | 1 | 6 | 7 | 12 | −5 | 7 | Relegation |
| 10 | AS Nika | 9 | 0 | 2 | 7 | 5 | 19 | −14 | 2 | Relegation |

Updated to match(es) played on 4 January 2015. Source: Soccerway
Rules for classification: 1) points; 2) fewer games lost; 3) goal difference; 4) goals scored.

| Home \ Away | ELI | FCM | GRO | MAK | MOT | NIK | RCK | ROJ | SXI | VIT |
|---|---|---|---|---|---|---|---|---|---|---|
| Elima | | 0–1 | | 3–0 | 0–1 | 3–2 | | 0–1 | | |
| FC MK | | | 0–0 | 1–1 | 1–1 | 2–0 | 1–1 | 0–0 | | 1–0 |
| Groupe Bazano | 1–1 | | | 2–1 | 0–1 | | 0–0 | | 1–0 | 0–1 |
| Makiso | | | | | | | 0–1 | 4–0 | | |
| Motema Pembe | | | | 1–0 | | | | 3–1 | 2–1 | 0–1 |
| Nika | | | 1–2 | 0–0 | 1–2 | | | | 0–3 | |
| RCK | 2–0 | | | | 0–1 | 1–1 | | 1–0 | | |
| Rojolu | | | 1–1 | | | 3–0 | | | 0–2 | 0–5 |
| Shark XI | 3–0 | 1–0 | | 0–1 | | | 1–0 | | | |
| V. Club | 1–0 | | | | | 3–0 | 4–1 | | 1–0 | |

Updated to match(es) played on 4 January 2015. Source: Soccerway
Legend: Blue = home team win; Yellow = draw; Red = away team win.

== Championship Round ==
=== Table ===
| Pos | Team | Pld | W | D | L | GF | GA | GD | Pts | Qualification |
|---|---|---|---|---|---|---|---|---|---|---|
| 1 | AS Vita Club | 9 | 6 | 3 | 0 | 16 | 4 | +12 | 21 | 2016 CAF Champions League |
| 2 | TP Mazembe | 9 | 6 | 2 | 1 | 19 | 6 | +13 | 20 | 2016 CAF Champions League |
| 3 | CS Don Bosco | 9 | 4 | 3 | 2 | 10 | 5 | +5 | 15 | 2016 CAF Confederation Cup |
| 4 | FC Saint Eloi Lupopo | 9 | 3 | 4 | 2 | 8 | 7 | +1 | 13 | |
| 5 | Lubumbashi Sport | 9 | 3 | 3 | 3 | 8 | 9 | −1 | 12 | |
| 6 | Sharks XI FC | 9 | 3 | 3 | 3 | 6 | 7 | −1 | 12 | |
| 7 | SM Sanga Balende | 9 | 3 | 2 | 4 | 8 | 8 | 0 | 11 | |
| 8 | JS Groupe Bazano | 9 | 3 | 2 | 4 | 10 | 11 | −1 | 11 | |
| 9 | DC Motema Pembe | 9 | 1 | 2 | 6 | 5 | 16 | −11 | 5 | |
| 10 | FC MK Etanchéité | 9 | 0 | 2 | 7 | 2 | 19 | −17 | 2 | |

Updated to match(es) played on 10 May 2015. Source: Soccerway
Rules for classification: 1) points; 2) fewer games lost; 3) goal difference; 4) goals scored.

| Home \ Away | DON | FCM | GRO | LUB | MOT | SEL | SAN | SXI | TPM | VIT |
|---|---|---|---|---|---|---|---|---|---|---|
| Don Bosco | | 3–0 | 0–0 | | 1–1 | | 2–1 | | | |
| FC MK | | | 1–2 | | | 1–2 | 0–2 | 0–0 | | 0–3 |
| Groupe Bazano | | | | | | 1–2 | 1–0 | | 0–1 | |
| Lubumbashi Sport | 0–3 | 2–0 | | | 2–0 | | 1–0 | | | |
| Motema Pembe | | 0–0 | 0–3 | | | 0–1 | 0–0 | | | 2–3 |
| Saint Eloi Lupopo | 0–0 | | | 0–0 | | | | 1–1 | 1–2 | 1–1 |
| Sanga Balende | | | | | | 1–0 | | 0–0 | 1–1 | 0–3 |
| Shark XI | 0–1 | | 2–1 | 1–0 | 0–2 | | | | 2–1 | |
| TP Mazembe | 2–0 | 5–0 | | 3–1 | 3–0 | | | | | 1–1 |
| V.Club | 1–0 | | 3–0 | 0–0 | | | | 1–0 | | |

Updated to match(es) played on 10 May 2014. Source: Soccerway
Legend: Blue = home team win; Yellow = draw; Red = away team win.
