= 2015–16 Linafoot =

Linafoot
- Season: 2015–16
- Champions: TP Mazembe

The 2015–16 Linafoot season is the 55th since its establishment. Linafoot is the top-flight association football league of DR Congo in Africa. TP Mazembe won the domestic league. The football club drew an average home attendance of 11,888.

== First round ==
=== Zone de développement Est ===
Pos	Team	Pld	W	D	L	GF	GA	GD	Pts	Qualification or relegation
1	OC Muungano	14	8	2	4	23	12	+11	26	Qualification to final round
2	AS Dauphins Noirs	14	7	5	2	19	8	+11	26	Qualification to final round
3	AC Capaco Beni	12	5	5	2	13	9	+4	20	
4	AC Nkoy Bilombe	13	4	3	6	6	15	−9	15	
5	CS Eldorado	13	3	5	5	13	14	−1	14	Relegated
6	AS Nika	12	3	3	6	9	17	−8	12	Relegated
7	CS Makiso	11	3	3	5	8	17	−9	12	
8	US Socozaki	13	2	4	7	13	18	−5	10	Relegated

Source: rsssf.com
Rules for classification: 1) points; 2) goal difference; 3) number of goals scored.

=== Zone de développement Ouest ===
Pos	Team	Pld	W	D	L	GF	GA	GD	Pts	Qualification or relegation
1	AS Vita Club	18	14	3	1	38	6	+32	45	Qualification to final round
2	DC Motema Pembe	18	11	5	2	30	12	+18	38	Qualification to final round
3	Shark XI FC	18	11	5	2	24	11	+13	38	Qualification to final round
4	RC Kinshasa	18	6	6	6	15	15	0	24	
5	FC MK Etanchéité	18	6	5	7	18	19	−1	23	
6	SC Rojolu	18	4	7	7	17	26	−9	19	
7	AS Dragons/Bilima	16	4	5	7	17	23	−6	17	
8	FC Nord Sport	17	4	4	9	15	28	−13	16	Relegated
9	TC Elima	15	3	3	9	10	22	−12	12	Relegated
10	AS Vutuka	16	1	1	14	6	28	−22	4	Relegated

Source: rsssf.com
Rules for classification: 1) points; 2) goal difference; 3) number of goals scored.

=== Zone de développement Centre-Sud ===
Pos	Team	Pld	W	D	L	GF	GA	GD	Pts	Qualification or relegation
1	TP Mazembe	18	12	6	0	44	7	+37	42	Qualification to final round
2	SM Sanga Balende	18	12	5	1	23	6	+17	41	Qualification to final round
3	FC Saint-Eloi Lupopo	18	10	7	1	30	8	+22	37	Qualification to final round
4	CS Don Bosco	18	7	6	5	25	14	+11	27	
5	Lubumbashi Sport	18	6	5	7	15	21	−6	23	
6	JS Groupe Bazano	17	4	6	7	15	19	−4	18	
7	FC Océan Pacifique	18	4	3	11	14	33	−19	15	
8	AS New Soger	17	2	7	8	7	24	−17	13	
9	US Tshinkunku	17	4	2	11	6	27	−21	14	Relegated
10	AS Bantous	17	1	5	11	6	26	−20	8	Relegated

Source: rsssf.com
Rules for classification: 1) points; 2) goal difference; 3) number of goals scored.

== Final round ==
Pos	Team	Pld	W	D	L	GF	GA	GD	Pts	Qualification
1	TP Mazembe	14	10	4	0	27	4	+23	34	Qualification to the 2017 CAF Champions League
2	AS Vita Club	14	8	5	1	23	6	+17	29	Qualification to the 2017 CAF Champions League
3	SM Sanga Balende	14	8	4	2	26	7	+19	28	Qualification to the 2017 CAF Confederation Cup
4	DC Motema Pembe	14	6	3	5	16	19	−3	21	
5	Shark XI FC	14	5	3	6	18	15	+3	18	
6	AS Dauphins Noirs	14	2	6	6	10	23	−13	12	
7	FC Saint-Eloi Lupopo	14	2	3	9	8	21	−13	9	
8	OC Muungano	14	0	2	12	3	36	−33	2	

Source: rsssf.com
Rules for classification: 1) points; 2) goal difference; 3) number of goals scored.
