= 2021–22 Linafoot =

Linafoot (Vodacom Ligue 1)
- Season: 2020–21
- Top goalscorer: Makabi Lilepo, 9
- Biggest home win: AS Vita Club 5-0 US Panda B52, AS Vita Club 5-0 AS Simba

The 2021–22 Linafoot was the 61st season of the Linafoot, the top-tier football league in the Democratic Republic of the Congo, since its establishment in 1958. Following the long interruption between 9 March and 29 May 2022, due to the clubs transport difficulties, the second half of the season was canceled.

== Teams ==
Twenty teams are compete in this season: the top 16 teams from the previous season and four promoted teams from the 2020–21 Linafoot Ligue 2 – US Panda B52, AS Kuya Sport, Etoile de Kivu, US Tshinkunku

=== Stadiums and locations ===
Team	Location	Stadium	Capacity
TP Mazembe	Lubumbashi	Stade TP Mazembe	18,000
AS Vita Club	Kinshasa	Stade des Martyrs	100,000
FC Saint-Éloi Lupopo	Lubumbashi	Stade Frederic Kibassa Maliba	35,000
AS Maniema Union	Kindu	Stade Joseph Kabila Kabange	10,000
CS Don Bosco	Lubumbashi	Stade TP Mazembe	18,000
Daring Club Motema Pembe	Kinshasa	Stade Tata Raphaël	80,000
JS Groupe Bazano	Lubumbashi	Stade Frederic Kibassa Maliba	35,000
Académic Club Rangers	Kinshasa	Stade des Martyrs	100,000
AS Dauphins Noirs	Goma	Stade de l'Unité	10,000
Lubumbashi Sport	Lubumbashi	Stade Frederic Kibassa Maliba	35,000
US Panda B52	Likasi	Stade de Kikula	5,000
AS Kuya Sport	Kinshasa	Stade des Martyrs	100,000
Etoile de Kivu	Bukavu	Stade Kadutu Concord	10,000
Blessing FC	Kolwezi	Stade Manika	3,000
SM Sanga Balende	Mbuji-Mayi	Stade Kashala Bonzola	15,000
FC Renaissance du Congo	Kinshasa	Stade Tata Raphaël	80,000
US Tshinkunku	Kananga	Stade des Jeunes	10,000
JS Kinshasa	Kinshasa	Stade des Martyrs	100,000
AS Simba	Kolwezi	Stade Manika	1,500
Racing Club Kinshasa	Kinshasa	Stade des Martyrs	100,000

== League table ==
As of February 23, 2022

Pos	Team	Pld	W	D	L	GF	GA	GD	Pts	Qualification or relegation
1	TP Mazembe (C)	19	16	3	0	40	3	+37	51	Qualification for the Champions League
2	AS Vita Club	19	15	3	1	44	13	+31	48	Qualification for the Champions League
3	FC Saint-Éloi Lupopo	19	14	4	1	32	9	+23	46	Qualification for the Confederation Cup
4	AS Maniema Union	19	12	5	2	31	10	+21	41	
5	JS Groupe Bazano	19	10	4	5	26	15	+11	34	
6	CS Don Bosco	19	8	8	3	20	15	+5	32	
7	DC Motema Pembe	19	8	5	6	23	17	+6	29	Qualification for the Confederation Cup (Note: DC Motema Pembe qualified for the Confederation Cup as the Coupe du Congo winners.)
8	AC Rangers	19	8	4	7	18	19	−1	28	
9	US Panda B52	19	6	6	7	17	19	−2	24	
10	AS Dauphins Noirs	19	7	2	10	15	20	−5	23	
11	FC Lubumbashi Sport	19	6	4	9	19	23	−4	22	
12	Etoile de Kivu	19	5	6	8	12	17	−5	21	
13	SM Sanga Balende	19	5	6	8	17	25	−8	21	
14	Blessing FC	19	4	7	8	13	16	−3	19	
15	AS Kuya Sport	19	4	7	8	18	28	−10	19	
16	FC Renaissance du Congo	19	4	6	9	17	27	−10	18	
17	US Tshinkunku	19	2	9	8	11	26	−15	15	Relegation to Linafoot Ligue 2
18	FC Simba Kolwezi	19	3	5	11	10	29	−19	14	Relegation to Linafoot Ligue 2
19	JS Kinshasa	19	2	2	15	6	36	−30	8	Relegation to Linafoot Ligue 2
20	RC Kinshasa	19	1	4	14	10	32	−22	7	Relegation to Linafoot Ligue 2

Source: soccerway.com
(C) Champions
