= 2019–20 Linafoot =

Linafoot (Vodacom Ligue 1)
- Season: 2019–20
- Champions: Mazembe

The 2019–20 Linafoot is the 59th season of the Linafoot, the top-tier football league in the Democratic Republic of the Congo, since its establishment in 1958. The season started on 16 August 2019., suspended on 16 March 2020 and abandoned on 13 May 2020 by the Congolese Association Football Federation due to the effects of the COVID-19 pandemic in DR Congo.

TP Mazembe, who were in first place at the time of abandonment (table considered final) and declared champions, and AS Vita Club, who were at second place, will represent DR Congo in the 2020–21 CAF Champions League.

AS Maniema Union and DC Motema Pembe, who were at third and fourth place, will represent DR Congo in the 2020–21 CAF Confederation Cup.

The last two in the standings, OC Bukavu Dawa and AS Nyuki, are relegated to Ligue 2.

== Teams changes ==
16 teams compete in this season: the top 13 teams from the previous season and three promoted teams from the Ligue 2.

Relegated from Ligue 1

- FC Mont Bleu
- AS Dragons/Bilima
- OC Muungano

Promoted from Ligue 2

- OC Bukavu Dawa
- RC Kinshasa
- FC Simba Kolwezi

== League table ==
Pos	Team	Pld	W	D	L	GF	GA	GD	Pts	Qualification or relegation
1	TP Mazembe	20	17	2	1	48	9	+39	53	Qualification for Champions League
2	AS Vita Club	23	13	9	1	40	12	+28	48	Qualification for Champions League
3	AS Maniema Union	21	14	4	3	42	15	+27	46	Qualification for Confederation Cup
4	DC Motema Pembe	21	12	6	3	40	16	+24	42	Qualification for Confederation Cup
5	JS Groupe Bazano	19	11	4	4	21	11	+10	37	
6	FC Renaissance du Congo	24	11	4	9	32	29	+3	37	
7	Académic Club Rangers	25	6	11	8	27	28	−1	29	
8	RC Kinshasa	23	6	10	7	25	22	+3	28	
9	FC Lubumbashi Sport	23	7	6	10	16	20	−4	27	
10	CS Don Bosco	23	4	13	6	23	23	0	25	
11	FC Saint-Éloi Lupopo	22	5	9	8	24	25	−1	24	
12	FC Simba Kolwezi	22	6	4	12	15	31	−16	22	
13	AS Dauphins Noirs	22	4	6	12	12	32	−20	18	
14	SM Sanga Balende	19	4	5	10	17	35	−18	17	
15	OC Bukavu Dawa	23	4	2	17	15	49	−34	14	Relegation to Ligue 2
16	AS Nyuki	22	3	3	16	15	55	−40	12	Relegation to Ligue 2

Updated to match(es) played on 13 May 2020. Source: rsssf.com
- FC Renaissance du Congo were excluded on 3 September following fan violence after their second match, at home to SM Sanga Balende on 2 September and suspended for both the 2019/20 and the 2020/21 season, but, they were readmitted 8 days later.

== Top goalscorers ==
As of 29 February 2020

Rank	Player	Club	Goals
1	(Democratic Republic of the Congo) Jackson Muleka	Mazembe	12
2	(Democratic Republic of the Congo) Tuisila Kisinda	Vita Club	11
3	(Democratic Republic of the Congo) Vinny Bongonga	DCMP	10
4	(Democratic Republic of the Congo) Lelo Amfumu	Rangers	9
4	(Democratic Republic of the Congo) Ntumba Libanza	RCK	9
5	(Democratic Republic of the Congo) Mambuma Tithi	Dauphins Noirs	8
6	(Democratic Republic of the Congo) Fiston Kalala Mayele	Vita Club	7
6	(Democratic Republic of the Congo) Patou Kabangu	Mazembe	7
7	(Democratic Republic of the Congo) Broulaye Sidibé	Renaissance	6
7	(Democratic Republic of the Congo) Isac Tshibangu	Mazembe	6
7	(Democratic Republic of the Congo) Jeremie Mumbere	Vita Club	6
7	(Democratic Republic of the Congo) Joël Beya	Mazembe	6
7	(Democratic Republic of the Congo) Likwela Yelemaya Denis	Maniema Union	6
7	(Democratic Republic of the Congo) Rodrigue Kitwa	Simba	6
