= List of football stadiums in the Democratic Republic of the Congo =

This is a list of football (soccer) stadiums in the Democratic Republic of the Congo, ranked in descending order of capacity with at least 5,000 spectators. Some stadiums are football-specific and some are also used for other purposes.

== Current stadiums ==
| # | Images | Stadium | Capacity | City | Home team(s) |
|---|---|---|---|---|---|
| 1 | | Stade des Martyrs | 80,000 | Kinshasa | National team |
| 2 | | Stade Tata Raphaël | 70,000 | Kinshasa | DC Motema Pembe, AS Vita Club |
| 3 | | Stade Lumumba | 30,000 | Kisangani | AS Nika, TS Malekesa, AS Makiso |
| 4 | | Stade Cardinal Malula | 24,000 | Kinshasa | AS Dragons |
| 5 | | Stade Dominiqie Diur | 22,000 | Kolwezi | AS Simba, FC Blessing |
| 6 | | Stade Frederic Kibassa Maliba | 20,000 | Lubumbashi | FC Saint Eloi Lupopo |
| 7 | | Stade de Kindia | 20,000 | Bunia | FC Mont Blue |
| 8 | | Stade TP Mazembe | 18,500 | Lubumbashi | TP Mazembe, CS Don Bosco |
| 9 | | Stade Joseph Kabila | 15,000 | Kalemie | FC Tanganyika, FC Etoile Jaune |
| 10 | | Stade Kashala Bonzola | 15,000 | Mbuji-Mayi | SM Sanga Balende |
| 11 | | Stade de l'Unité | 10,000 | Goma | AS Dauphins Noirs, DC Virunga |
| 12 | | Stade de la Concorde | 10,000 | Bukavu | OC Muungano |
| 13 | | Stade des Jeunes | 10,000 | Kananga | US Tshinkunku, AS Saint-Luc |
| 14 | | Stade de Mugunga | 10,000 | Goma | AS Dauphins Noirs, DC Virunga |
| 15 | | Stade Joseph Kabila | 10,000 | Kindu | AS Maniema Union |
| 16 | | Stade de Kikula | 5,000 | Likasi | US Panda B52 |

== Under construction ==
| Stadium | Capacity | City | Home team(s) | Status | Opening |
|---|---|---|---|---|---|
| Stade Lumumba | 27,000 | Matadi | AS Veti Club, TC Elima | Under construction | - |
| Stade Nyantende | 10,000 | Bukavu | OC Bukavu Dawa , OC Muungano, FC Etoile du Kivu | Under construction | - |

== See also ==
- List of African stadiums by capacity
- List of association football stadiums by capacity
- List of association football stadiums by country
- List of sports venues by capacity
- Lists of stadiums
- Football in the Democratic Republic of the Congo
