= 2013 Linafoot =

Linafoot
- Season: 2013
- Champions: TP Mazembe
- Champions League: TP Mazembe; Vita Club
- Confederation Cup: Don Bosco; MK Etanchéité (cup winner)

The 2013 Linafoot season (known as the Vodacom Superligue 2013 for sponsorship reasons) was the 52nd edition since its establishment. It began on 20 March 2013 and ended on 23 June 2013. Only the first round was disputed, as halfway into the tournament, the Congolese Association Football Federation (FECOFA) decided to switch to a new competition format, with 'European' style calendar from October to May. The 2013–14 Linafoot was the first edition to be disputed under the new format.

All matches played by TC Elima were awarded as 0-3 victories to its opponents after the completion of the tournament, for fielding an ineligible player, Patou Tingo Disasi.

== Clubs ==
A total of 14 teams are contesting the league, played under a round-robbin format.

Locations of teams in the 2012 Linafoot

| Team | Location | Stadium | Capacity |
|---|---|---|---|
| AS Dauphins Noirs | Goma | Stade de Virunga | 10,000 |
| AS Vita Club | Kinshasa | Stade des Martyrs | 80,000 |
| CS Don Bosco | Lubumbashi | Stade Frederic Kibassa Maliba | 35,000 |
| CS Makiso | Kisangani | Stade Lumumba | 10,000 |
| DC Motema Pembe | Kinshasa | Stade des Martyrs | 80,000 |
| DC Virunga | Goma | Stade de Virunga | 10,000 |
| FC Saint Eloi Lupopo | Lubumbashi | Stade Frederic Kibassa Maliba | 35,000 |
| OC Muungano | Bukavu | Stade de la Concorde | 10,000 |
| SC Rojolu | Kinshasa | Stade des Martyrs | 80,000 |
| SM Sanga Balende | Mbuji-Mayi | Stade Tshikisha | 8,000 |
| TC Elima | Matadi | Stade Socol | 5,000 |
| TP Mazembe | Lubumbashi | Stade Mazembe | 18,500 |
| TP Molunge | Mbandaka | Stade Bakusu | 1,500 |
| US Tshinkunku | Kananga | Stade des Jeunes | 10,000 |

== League table ==
| Pos | Team | Pld | W | D | L | GF | GA | GD | Pts | Qualification or relegation |
|---|---|---|---|---|---|---|---|---|---|---|
| 1 | TP Mazembe | 13 | 11 | 2 | 0 | 38 | 4 | +34 | 35 | 2014 CAF Champions League |
| 2 | AS Vita Club | 13 | 10 | 2 | 1 | 30 | 5 | +25 | 32 | 2014 CAF Champions League |
| 3 | CS Don Bosco | 13 | 7 | 3 | 3 | 26 | 13 | +13 | 24 | 2014 CAF Confederation Cup |
| 4 | DC Motema Pembe | 13 | 7 | 3 | 3 | 20 | 7 | +13 | 24 | |
| 5 | SM Sanga Balende | 13 | 8 | 0 | 5 | 19 | 11 | +8 | 24 | |
| 6 | FC Saint Eloi Lupopo | 13 | 6 | 4 | 3 | 17 | 11 | +6 | 22 | |
| 7 | US Tshinkunku | 13 | 5 | 2 | 6 | 14 | 21 | −7 | 17 | |
| 8 | AS Dauphins Noirs | 13 | 4 | 3 | 6 | 16 | 17 | −1 | 15 | |
| 9 | OC Muungano | 13 | 4 | 3 | 6 | 12 | 13 | −1 | 15 | |
| 10 | AS Rojolu | 13 | 4 | 3 | 6 | 12 | 22 | −10 | 15 | |
| 11 | TP Molunge | 13 | 4 | 1 | 8 | 16 | 27 | −11 | 13 | |
| 12 | CS Makiso | 13 | 3 | 3 | 7 | 7 | 19 | −12 | 12 | |
| 13 | DC Virunga | 13 | 2 | 3 | 8 | 10 | 28 | −18 | 9 | |
| 14 | TC Elima | 13 | 0 | 0 | 13 | 0 | 39 | −39 | 0 | |

Updated to match(es) played on 25 July 2013. Source:
Rules for classification: 1) points; 2) goal difference; 3) number of goals scored.
