= 2016–17 Linafoot =

Linafoot
- Season: 2016–17
- Champions: TP Mazembe

The 2016–17 Linafoot season is the 56th since its establishment as the top-flight association football league of the DR Congo. A total of 28 clubs participated in the First Round, divided into three regional groups, with 8 teams advancing to the nationwide Championship Round. TP Mazembe won the domestic league.

== First round ==
There were three regional divisions with 8 to 10 teams. Advancing to the Championship Round were 2 teams from the East, 3 from the West, and 3 from the Center-South.

=== Zone de développement Est ===
Pos	Team	Pld	W	D	L	GF	GA	GD	Pts	Qualification
1	OC Bukavu Dawa	10	5	5	0	12	7	+5	20	Qualification to final round
2	OC Muungano	10	6	2	2	12	3	+9	20	Qualification to final round
3	AS Dauphins Noirs	10	6	2	2	12	6	+6	20	
4	DC Virunga	10	2	4	4	7	13	−6	10	
5	AC Nkoy Bilombe	10	2	1	7	9	14	−5	7	
6	CS Makiso	10	2	0	8	8	17	−9	6	
7	AC Capaco Beni	0	0	0	0	0	0	0	0	Disqualified; all results annulled
8	AS Nika	0	0	0	0	0	0	0	0	Disqualified; all results annulled

Rules for classification: 1) points; 2) goal difference; 3) number of goals scored.

=== Zone de développement Ouest ===
Pos	Team	Pld	W	D	L	GF	GA	GD	Pts	Qualification or relegation
1	AS Vita Club	18	13	4	1	37	9	+28	43	Qualification to final round
2	DC Motema Pembe	18	12	5	1	37	9	+28	41	Qualification to final round
3	FC Renaissance du Congo	18	9	5	4	30	14	+16	32	Qualification to final round
4	RC Kinshasa	18	9	2	7	29	25	+4	29	
5	AS Dragons/Bilima	18	8	2	8	18	20	−2	26	
6	Shark XI FC	18	7	4	7	21	17	+4	25	
7	FC MK Etanchéité	18	6	5	7	19	23	−4	23	
8	AS Veti Club	18	4	7	7	11	23	−12	19	
9	SC Rojolu	18	2	3	13	12	28	−16	9	Relegated
10	AS Ndombe	18	1	1	16	12	58	−46	4	Relegated

Rules for classification: 1) points; 2) goal difference; 3) number of goals scored.

=== Zone de développement Centre-Sud ===
Pos	Team	Pld	W	D	L	GF	GA	GD	Pts	Qualification or relegation
1	TP Mazembe	18	14	3	1	38	3	+35	45	Qualification to final round
2	SM Sanga Balende	18	13	3	2	31	8	+23	42	Qualification to final round
3	CS Don Bosco	18	11	4	3	27	13	+14	37	Qualification to final round
4	FC Saint-Eloi Lupopo	18	7	4	7	18	18	0	25	
5	Lubumbashi Sport	18	5	6	7	13	19	−6	21	
6	AC Dibumba	18	5	5	8	14	25	−11	20	
7	JS Groupe Bazano	18	6	2	10	10	21	−11	20	
8	FC Océan Pacifique	18	5	4	9	17	28	−11	19	
9	FC Simba Kamikaze	18	4	5	9	17	24	−7	17	Relegated
10	AS New Soger	18	1	2	15	8	34	−26	5	Relegated

Rules for classification: 1) points; 2) goal difference; 3) number of goals scored.

== Final round ==
Pos	Team	Pld	W	D	L	GF	GA	GD	Pts	Qualification
1	TP Mazembe	14	10	3	1	27	8	+19	33	Qualification to the 2018 CAF Champions League
2	AS Vita Club	14	9	3	2	20	7	+13	30	Qualification to the 2018 CAF Champions League
3	DC Motema Pembe	14	8	3	3	27	12	+15	27	Qualification to the 2018 CAF Confederation Cup
4	CS Don Bosco	14	5	3	6	23	19	+4	18	
5	SM Sanga Balende	14	5	3	6	13	17	−4	18	
6	FC Renaissance du Congo	14	4	3	7	13	24	−11	15	Excluded from the championship; relegated
7	OC Muungano	14	1	5	8	3	21	−18	8	
8	OC Bukavu Dawa	14	0	5	9	5	23	−18	5	

Rules for classification: 1) points; 2) goal difference; 3) number of goals scored.
