= 2017–18 Linafoot =

Linafoot
- Season: 2017–18
- Champions: AS Vita Club

The 2017–18 Linafoot season is the 57th since its establishment. Linafoot is the top-flight association football league of DR Congo in Africa. The season started on 11 November 2017 and ended on 14 July 2018.

== First round ==
There are three regional divisions with 8 to 10 teams. Advancing are top 3 from East, top 4 from West, top 4 from Center-South, and the best 5th-placed team from West or Center-South.

=== Zone de développement Est ===
Pos	Team	Pld	W	D	L	GF	GA	GD	Pts	Qualification
1	AS Maniema Union	14	7	5	2	24	12	+12	26	Qualification to final round
2	FC Mont Bleu	14	6	4	4	18	15	+3	22	Qualification to final round
3	AS Dauphins Noirs	14	6	2	6	12	9	+3	20	Qualification to final round
4	DC Virunga	14	6	2	6	16	16	0	20	
5	OC Muungano	14	6	2	6	15	15	0	20	
6	OC Bukavu Dawa	14	4	7	3	7	8	−1	19	
7	FC Umoja/Etoile du Kivu	14	3	5	6	10	15	−5	14	
8	CS Makiso	14	2	5	7	11	23	−12	11	

Source: Linafoot
Rules for classification: 1) points; 2) goal difference; 3) number of goals scored.

=== Zone de développement Ouest ===
Pos	Team	Pld	W	D	L	GF	GA	GD	Pts	Qualification
1	DC Motema Pembe	16	13	3	0	28	4	+24	42	Qualification to final round
2	AS Vita Club	16	11	3	2	28	5	+23	36	Qualification to final round
3	Académic Club Rangers	16	7	5	4	24	16	+8	26	Qualification to final round
4	AS Dragons/Bilima	16	5	6	5	18	19	−1	21	Qualification to final round
5	TP Molunge	16	4	5	7	14	19	−5	17	
6	Racing Club Kinshasa	16	4	5	7	13	18	−5	17	
7	FC MK Etanchéité	16	3	5	8	15	24	−9	14	
8	FC Renaissance du Congo	16	3	5	8	9	27	−18	14	
9	FC Nord Sport	16	0	7	9	10	27	−17	7	
10	Sharks XI	0	0	0	0	0	0	0	0	Withdrew

Source: Linafoot
Rules for classification: 1) points; 2) goal difference; 3) number of goals scored.

=== Zone de développement Centre Sud ===
Pos	Team	Pld	W	D	L	GF	GA	GD	Pts	Qualification
1	TP Mazembe	18	13	4	1	42	5	+37	43	Qualification to final round
2	FC Saint-Eloi Lupopo	18	10	3	5	25	17	+8	33	Qualification to final round
3	CS Don Bosco	18	8	7	3	16	9	+7	31	Qualification to final round
4	SM Sanga Balende	18	8	5	5	21	14	+7	29	Qualification to final round
5	JS Groupe Bazano	18	6	5	7	16	21	−5	23	Qualification to final round
6	Ecofoot Katumbi	18	5	7	6	12	19	−7	22	
7	Lubumbashi Sport	18	5	4	9	15	18	−3	19	
8	US Tshinkunku	18	5	4	9	14	25	−11	19	
9	AC Dibumba	18	2	8	8	12	24	−12	14	
10	FC Océan Pacifique	18	2	5	11	9	30	−21	11	

Source: Linafoot
Rules for classification: 1) points; 2) goal difference; 3) number of goals scored.

== Final round ==
A total of 12 teams participate in the final round.

- Zone de développement Est: AS Maniema Union (Kindu), FC Mont Bleu (Bunia), AS Dauphin Noir (Goma)
- Zone de développement Ouest: DC Motema Pembe (Kinshasa), AS Vita Club (Kinshasa), Académic Club Rangers (Kinshasa), AS Dragons/Bilima (Kinshasa)
- Zone de développement Centre-Sud: TP Mazembe (Lubumbashi), FC Saint-Eloi Lupopo (Lubumbashi), SM Sanga Balende (Mbuji-Mayi), CS Don Bosco (Lubumbashi), JS Groupe Bazano (Lubumbashi) [as best 5th placed team]

Pos	Team	Pld	W	D	L	GF	GA	GD	Pts	Qualification
1	AS Vita Club	22	18	2	2	55	9	+46	56	Qualification to the 2018–19 CAF Champions League
2	TP Mazembe	22	16	5	1	39	5	+34	53	Qualification to the 2018–19 CAF Champions League
3	DC Motema Pembe	22	16	2	4	45	12	+33	50	Qualification to the 2018–19 CAF Confederation Cup
4	SM Sanga Balende	22	15	4	3	42	7	+35	49	
5	FC Saint-Eloi Lupopo	22	9	6	7	23	21	+2	33	
6	AS Maniema Union	22	10	3	9	28	25	+3	33	
7	CS Don Bosco	22	6	5	11	18	34	−16	23	
8	FC Mont Bleu	22	6	4	12	21	34	−13	22	
9	Académic Club Rangers	22	5	2	15	16	42	−26	17	
10	JS Groupe Bazano	22	4	4	14	12	43	−31	16	
11	AS Dauphins Noirs	22	3	3	16	8	44	−36	12	
12	AS Dragons/Bilima	22	2	4	16	14	45	−31	10	

Source: Linafoot
Rules for classification: 1) points; 2) goal difference; 3) number of goals scored.

== Top scorers ==
Rang	Joueur	Club	Buts
1	(Democratic Republic of the Congo) Ben MALANGO	(Democratic Republic of the Congo) Mazembe	15
2	(Democratic Republic of the Congo) Alidor KAYEMBE	(Democratic Republic of the Congo) Lupopo	10
3	(Democratic Republic of the Congo) Bossu NZOLI	(Democratic Republic of the Congo) AC RANGERS	10
4	(Democratic Republic of the Congo) Mamba MULOMBOZI	(Democratic Republic of the Congo) Mont Bleu	9
5	(Democratic Republic of the Congo) Dago TSHIBAMBA	(Democratic Republic of the Congo) dcmp	8
6	(Democratic Republic of the Congo) MUSEME	(Democratic Republic of the Congo) Sanga Balende	

== See also ==
- 2018 Coupe du Congo
