= Kévin Mondeko =

Congolese professional footballer

Personal information
- Full name: Kévin Mondeko Zatu
- Date of birth: 10 September 1995 (age 31)
- Place of birth: Kinshasa, DR Congo
- Height: 1.83 m (6 ft 0 in)
- Position: Centre-back

Team information
- Current team: CS Sfaxien
- Number: 15

Senior career*
Years	Team	Apps	(Gls)
–2016	RC Kinshasa		
2016–2024	TP Mazembe		(5)
2024–2025	USM Alger	22	(2)
2025–	CS Sfaxien	25	(0)

International career^{‡}
2019–	DR Congo	2	(0)
2019–2023	DR Congo A'	5	(0)
- * Club domestic league appearances and goals as of 18 July 2026 ‡ National team caps and goals as of 01:32, 15 September 2024 (UTC)

Kévin Mondeko (born 10 September 1995) is a Congolese professional footballer who plays as a centre-back for Tunisian Ligue Professionnelle 1 club CS Sfaxien and the DR Congo national team.

== Professional career ==
On November 25, 2017, Kévin Mondeko won his first continental title with TP Mazembe by winning the CAF Confederation Cup against Supersport United despite being a substitute in the final. A member of TP Mazembe since 2016, Kévin Mondeko's contract ended on June 30, 2024, and as the two parties have not agreed on the extension of the contract, Mondeko therefore responded favorably to the request of the Red and Black, although he was also requested by CS Constantine, Where on July 23, 2024, Mondeko's sign a two-season contract. On September 14, 2024, Mondeko played as a starter in his first match with his new team in the CAF Confederation Cup against Stade Tunisien. In the second leg, Mondeko scored his first goal with a bicycle kick to lead USM Alger to the group stage.

== International career ==
On October 13, 2019, Kévin Mondeko made his debut with the DR Congo national football team against Ivory Coast in a friendly match. On January 2, 2023, Mondeko was called up by Otis Ngoma for the 28-man DR Congo A' squad to participate in the 2022 African Nations Championship, where the Leopards was eliminated from the group stage and Mondeko received a red card in the last match against Senegal.

== Career statistics ==
=== Club ===
As of 10 February 2025

Club	Season	League			Cup		Continental		Other		Total	
Club	Season	Division	Apps	Goals	Apps	Goals	Apps	Goals	Apps	Goals	Apps	Goals
TP Mazembe	2016–17	Linafoot	0	0	0	0	8 (Note: 6 appearances in 2017 CAF Confederation Cup, 2 appearances in 2017 CAF Champions League)	0	—		8	0
TP Mazembe	2017–18	Linafoot	0	0	0	0	7 (Note: 1 appearance in 2018 CAF Super Cup, 4 appearances in 2017 CAF Confederation Cup, 2 appearances in 2018 CAF Champions League)	0	—		7	0
TP Mazembe	2018–19	Linafoot	0	0	0	0	10 (Note: All appearance(s) in Champions League)	3	—		0	0
TP Mazembe	2019–20	Linafoot	0	0	0	0	5	0	—		0	0
TP Mazembe	2020–21	Linafoot	0	0	0	0	—		—		0	0
TP Mazembe	2021–22	Linafoot	0	0	0	0	10 (Note: All appearance(s) in CAF Confederation Cup)	1	—		0	0
TP Mazembe	2022–23	Linafoot	0	0	0	0	9 (Note: 7 appearances in CAF Confederation Cup, 2 appearances in CAF Champions League)	0	—		0	0
TP Mazembe	2023–24	Linafoot	0	0	0	0	9 (Note: 2 appearances in African Football League, 7 appearances and 1 goals in CAF Champions League)	1	—		0	0
TP Mazembe	Total		0	0	0	0	58	5	—		58	5
USM Alger	2024–25	Ligue 1	7	0	2	0	6	1	—		15	1
Career total			7	0	2	0	61	6	—		73	6

== Career statistics ==
=== International ===
As of matches played 22 January 2023

Appearances and goals by national team and year
National team	Year	Apps	Goals
DR Congo	2019	2	0
DR Congo	2022	2	0
DR Congo	2023	3	0
Total		7	0

== Honours ==
TP Mazembe

- Linafoot: 2016–17, 2018–19, 2019–20, 2021–22, 2023–24
- CAF Confederation Cup: 2017

USM Alger

- Algerian Cup: 2024–25
