= Yaw Frimpong =

Ghanaian footballer (born 1986)

Personal information
- Full name: Yaw Frimpong
- Date of birth: 4 December 1986 (age 39)
- Place of birth: Accra, Greater Accra, Ghana
- Height: 1.67 m (5 ft 6 in)
- Position: Right full-back

Youth career
- Feyenoord Academy

Senior career*
Years	Team	Apps	(Gls)
2005–2008	Feyenoord Academy	28	(0)
2009–2010	ASEC Mimosas	–	(–)
2011–2013	Asante Kotoko	50	(0)
2013–2017	TP Mazembe	100	(1)
2018–2020	Asante Kotoko	120	(0)
- * Club domestic league appearances and goals ‡ National team caps and goals as of 8 July 2021

Yaw Frimpong (born 4 December 1986, in Accra) is a Ghanaian professional footballer.

== Career ==
He began his career in Feyenoord Academy, was 2005 promoted to first team, on 15 November 2008 was on trial at Sweden side Helsingborgs IF, later joined than on 16 January 2009 to ASEC Mimosas. After two season with ASEC Mimosas signed in December 2010 for Asante Kotoko.

== International career ==
He was member of the Ghana national under-23 football team for the camp for the 2006 Olympic qualifications.

== Honours ==
ASEC Mimosas

- Côte d'Ivoire Premier Division: 2009, 2010

Asante Kotoko

- Ghana Premier League: 2011–12, 2012–13
- Ghana Super Cup: 2012

TP Mazembe

- DR Congo Championship : 2013, 2013–14, 2015–16, 2016–17
- DR Congo Super Cup : 2013, 2014, 2016
- CAF Champions League : 2015
- Confederation Cup : 2016, 2017, runner up: 2013
- CAF Super Cup : 2016, runner up : 2017
