= Ben Malango =

Congolese footballer

Personal information
- Full name: Ben Malango Ngita
- Date of birth: 10 November 1993 (age 33)
- Place of birth: Lubumbashi, Zaire
- Height: 1.91 m (6 ft 3 in)
- Position: Forward

Team information
- Current team: Al-Zulfi
- Number: 28

Senior career*
Years	Team	Apps	(Gls)
2013–2016	CS Don Bosco		
2016–2019	TP Mazembe	108	(58)
2019–2021	Raja CA	46	(21)
2021–2022	Al-Sharjah	22	(9)
2022–2025	Qatar	47	(14)
2026–	Al-Zulfi	0	(0)

International career^{‡}
2017–	DR Congo	21	(6)
- * Club domestic league appearances and goals as of 9 December 2024 (UTC) ‡ National team caps and goals as of 13 January 2023 (UTC)

Ben Malango Ngita (10 November 1993), is a Congolese professional footballer who plays for Saudi club Al-Zulfi as a forward.

== Career statistics ==
=== Club ===
As of match played 9 December 2024

Appearances and goals by club, season and competition
Club	Season	League			National cup		Continental		Other		Total	
Club	Season	Division	Apps	Goals	Apps	Goals	Apps	Goals	Apps	Goals	Apps	Goals
Mazembe	2016–17	Linafoot		18			12 (Note: Appearances in CAF Confederation Cup)	6	1 (Note: Appearance in CAF Super Cup)	0		
Mazembe	2017–18	Linafoot		22			8 (Note: Appearances in CAF Champions League)	7	1	0		
Mazembe	2018–19	Linafoot					4 (Note: Appearances in CAF Champions League)	0				
Mazembe	Total						25	13	2	0	108	58
Raja	2019–20	Botola	20	5	—		9 (Note: Appearances in CAF Champions League)	3	7 (Note: Appearances in Arab Club Champions Cup)	2	36	10
Raja	2020–21	Botola	26	16	3	2	12 (Note: 1 Appearance in CAF Champions League) (Note: 11 Appearances in CAF Confederation Cup)	6 (Note: 6 Goals in CAF Confederation Cup)	1	1	42	25
Raja	Total		46	21	3	2	21	9	8	3	78	35
Sharjah	2021–22	UPL	22	9	2	0	4 (Note: Appearances in AFC Champions League)	0	3 (Note: Appearances in UAE League Cup)	2	31	12
Qatar	2022–23	QSL	3	5	0	0	0	0	4 (Note: Appearances in FIFA Referees Cup)	2	6	7
Qatar	2023–24	QSL	22	5	0	0	0	0	3 (Note: Appearances in Qatar Stars Cup)	1	25	6
Qatar	2024–25	QSL	11	3	0	0	0	0	3 (Note: Appearances in Qatar Stars Cup)	1	14	4
Career total							50	22	23	9	260	122

=== International ===
Scores and results list DR Congo's goal tally first.

No.	Date	Venue	Opponent	Score	Result	Competition
1.	28 May 2018	Adokiye Amiesimaka Stadium, Port Harcourt, Nigeria	Nigeria	1–1	1–1	Friendly
2.	11 June 2021	Stade El Menzah, Tunis, Tunisia	Mali	1–1	1–1	Friendly
3.	11 November 2021	National Stadium, Dar es Salaam, Tanzania	Tanzania	3–0	3–0	2022 FIFA World Cup qualification
4.	14 November 2021	Stade des Martyrs, Kinshasa, Democratic Republic of the Congo	Benin	2–0	2–0	2022 FIFA World Cup qualification
5.	29 March 2022	Stade Mohammed V, Casablanca, Morocco	Morocco	1–4	1–4	2022 FIFA World Cup qualification
6.	27 September 2022	Stade Père Jégo, Casablanca, Morocco	Sierra Leone	1–0	3–0	Friendly

== Honours ==
TP Mazembe

- Linafoot: 2016–17, 2018–19
- CAF Confederation Cup: 2017
- CAF Super Cup runner-up: 2017, 2018

Raja Casablanca

- Botola: 2019–20
- CAF Confederation Cup: 2020–21
- Arab Club Champions Cup: 2019–20

Individual

- Linafoot Top scorer: 2016–17
- CAF Confederation Cup Top scorer: 2017, 2020–21
- Botola Best Foreign Player: 2020–21
- Botola Team of the Season: 2020–21
