= 2013–14 Linafoot =

Linafoot
- Season: 2013–14
- Champions: TP Mazembe
- Champions League: TP Mazembe; Sanga Balende
- Confederation Cup: Vita Club; MK Etanchéité (cup winner)

The 2013–14 Linafoot season (known as the Vodacom Super Ligue 2013–14 for sponsorship reasons) was the 53rd since its establishment. It started on 27 October 2013, and concluded 11 May 2014. A total of 16 clubs participated in the 2013–14 season.

== League table ==
=== Group A ===
Pos	Team	Pld	W	D	L	GF	GA	GD	Pts	Qualification
1	TP Mazembe (A)	14	9	4	1	31	3	+28	31	Qualification to the Championship Playoff
2	CS Don Bosco (A)	14	10	1	3	30	10	+20	31	Qualification to the Championship Playoff
3	FC Saint Eloi Lupopo	14	9	2	3	22	8	+14	29	
4	FC MK Etanchéité	14	5	3	6	15	21	−6	18	Qualification to the 2015 CAF Confederation Cup (Note: MK Etanchéité qualified for the 2015 CAF Confederation Cup as the 2014 Coupe du Congo winner.)
5	AS Dauphins Noirs	14	3	6	5	12	19	−7	15	
6	AS Nika	14	4	2	8	13	23	−10	14	
7	TC Elima	14	2	5	7	8	27	−19	11	
8	CS Makiso	14	1	3	10	3	23	−20	6	

Source: soccerway.com
Rules for classification: 1) points; 2) goal difference; 3) number of goals scored.
(A) Advance to a further round

=== Group B ===
Pos	Team	Pld	W	D	L	GF	GA	GD	Pts	Qualification
1	AS Vita Club (A)	14	12	1	1	26	6	+20	37	Qualification to the Championship Playoff
2	SM Sanga Balende (A)	14	9	2	3	17	9	+8	29	Qualification to the Championship Playoff
3	Lubumbashi Sport	14	6	5	3	20	13	+7	23	
4	DC Motema Pembe	14	6	1	7	18	20	−2	19	
5	Shark XI FC	14	5	3	6	13	12	+1	18	
6	SC Rojolu	14	4	1	9	10	18	−8	13	
7	OC Muungano	14	3	3	8	9	18	−9	12	
8	US Tshinkunku	14	1	4	9	11	28	−17	7	

Source: soccerway.com
Rules for classification: 1) points; 2) goal difference; 3) number of goals scored.
(A) Advance to a further round

== Championship Play off ==
Pos	Team	Pld	W	D	L	GF	GA	GD	Pts	Qualification
1	TP Mazembe (C)	6	4	1	1	12	2	+10	13	2015 CAF Champions League
2	SM Sanga Balende	6	4	0	2	4	5	−1	12	2015 CAF Champions League
3	AS Vita Club	6	3	0	3	6	6	0	9	2015 CAF Confederation Cup
4	CS Don Bosco	6	0	1	5	0	9	−9	1	

Source: soccerway.com
Rules for classification: 1) points; 2) goal difference; 3) number of goals scored.
(C) Champions
