= Adama Traoré (footballer, born 5 June 1995) =

Malian footballer

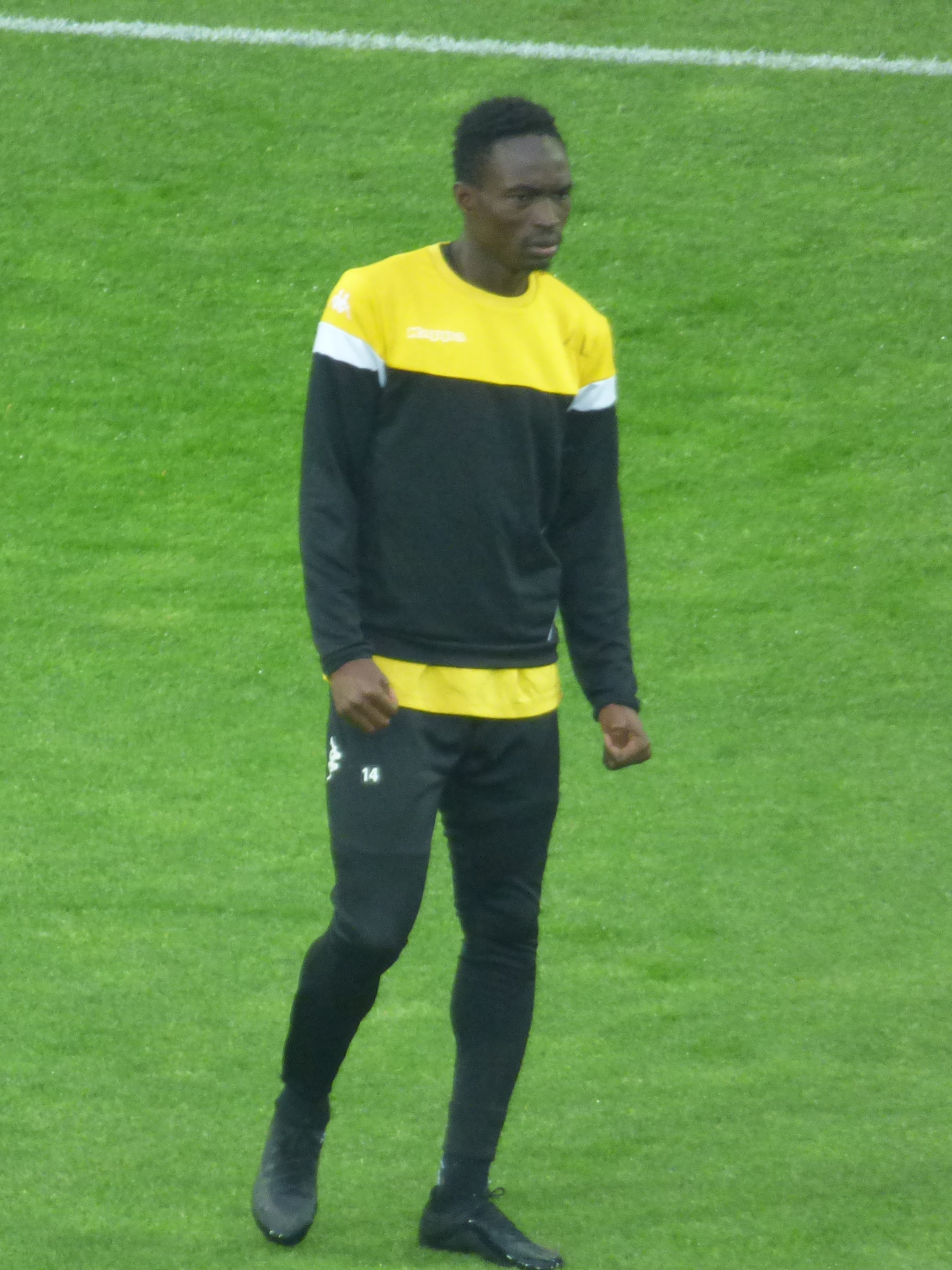
- Traoré in 2019

Personal information
- Full name: Adama Traoré
- Date of birth: 5 June 1995 (age 31)
- Place of birth: Bamako, Mali
- Height: 1.77 m (5 ft 10 in)
- Position: Winger

Team information
- Current team: Gençlerbirliği
- Number: 14

Youth career
- 2011–2013: Bamako

Senior career*
Years	Team	Apps	(Gls)
2013–2018	TP Mazembe	153	(27)
2018–2021	Metz B	6	(1)
2018–2021	Metz	2	(0)
2019	→ Orléans (loan)	6	(0)
2020	→ Al-Adalah (loan)	16	(1)
2021–2022	Sheriff Tiraspol	38	(17)
2022–2025	Ferencváros	69	(21)
2025–	Gençlerbirliği	22	(3)
2025–2026	→ Al-Ula (loan)	17	(2)

International career^{‡}
2012–2013	Mali U20		
2015	Mali U23	4	(1)
2013–	Mali	61	(9)
- * Club domestic league appearances and goals as of 19 September 2026 ‡ National team caps and goals as of 23 November 2025 (UTC)

Adama Traoré (born 5 June 1995), also known as Adama Malouda Traoré, is a Malian professional footballer who plays as a winger for Turkish Süper Lig club Gençlerbirliği and the Mali national team.

== Club career ==
=== TP Mazembe ===
In 2011, Traoré joined the youth ranks of Olympique Bamako, and in summer 2013 joined TP Mazembe. He made his CAF Champions League debut in a 0–0 draw to Egyptian side Zamalek in the 2014 CAF Champions League group stage. On 10 August 2014, he scored his first goal in the CAF Champions League, in a 3–1 home win against Sudanese club Al-Hilal. Next season, he helped Mazembe win a 5th continental title, playing in both the legs of the final against USM Alger, coming close in the second match when his shot from close range missed the target narrowly. Mazembe thus qualified for the 2015 FIFA Club World Cup in Japan, where they finished 6th after losing to Sanfrecce Hiroshima and América.

On 20 February 2016, he won the 2016 CAF Super Cup, after a 2–1 win over Tunisian side Étoile du Sahel. In the 2016 season, after losing 3–1 on aggregate to Wydad Casablanca, Mazembe qualified for the 2016 CAF Confederation Cup play-off round where they faced Stade Gabèsien. He made his CAF Confederation Cup debut in the first leg against Gabèsien and was subbed out in the 69th minute for Déo Kanda. Mazembe eventually went all the way and on 6 November 2016 won their first Confederation Cup title after defeating MO Béjaïa in the final. Mazembe retained the Confederation Cup next season, when they defeated Supersport United in the final. Traoré scored in the first leg when his strike made its way through a crowd of players leaving Ronwen Williams very little time to react. Traoré also won the 2013–14, 2015–16 and 2016–17 league seasons with Mazembe.

=== Metz ===
On 20 August 2018, Traoré joined French club FC Metz on a four-year deal. He made his Ligue 2 debut on 17 September, coming on as an 87th-minute substitute for Opa Nguette in a 3–1 away victory over Béziers. In January 2019, he was loaned to Orléans of the same league until the end of the season.

Traoré was loaned to Al-Adalah FC of the Saudi Professional League on 19 January 2020, for the rest of the season. In July, the loan was extended until September so he could finish the season which had been interrupted by the COVID-19 pandemic.

=== Sheriff Tiraspol ===
On 10 February 2021, Traoré signed for Sheriff Tiraspol.

On 15 September 2021, Traoré scored against FC Shakhtar Donetsk in what was Sheriff Tiraspol's first ever UEFA Champions League match. The team went on to win 2–0.

=== Ferencváros ===
On 5 May 2023, he won the 2022–23 Nemzeti Bajnokság I with Ferencváros, after Kecskemét lost 1–0 to Honvéd at the Bozsik Aréna on the 30th matchday.

On 6 August 2023, he scored his first goal in the 2023–24 Nemzeti Bajnokság I season against Fehérvár FC at the Sóstói Stadion.

On 20 April 2024, the Ferencváros–Kisvárda tie ended with a goalless draw at the Groupama Aréna on the 29th match day of the 2023–24 Nemzeti Bajnokság I season which meant that Ferencváros won their 35th championship.

On 15 May 2024, Ferencváros were defeated by Paks 2–0 in the 2024 Magyar Kupa Final at the Puskás Aréna.

=== Al-Ula ===
On 12 September 2025, Traoré joined Saudi FDL club Al-Ula on a one-year loan.

== International career ==
Traoré was part of the Mali under-20 team who participated in the 2013 FIFA U-20 World Cup in Turkey. He only played one match where he was withdrawn at half time for Tiécoro Keita, in a 4–1 defeat against Mexico, as Mali went down in the group stage.

On 6 July 2013, Traoré made his national team debut in a 3–1 2014 CHAN qualification win over Guinea. On 6 January 2014, he was named in Mali's 23-man squad for the 2014 African Nations Championship. Five days later, he scored his first ever senior international goal in the 2–1 opening match win against Nigeria, nutmegging keeper Chigozie Agbim in a 2–1 win. After topping the group ahead of Nigeria, Mali were knocked out of the tournament in the quarter-finals, 2–1 by Zimbabwe. In November 2015, Traoré was named in Mali's 21-man squad for the 2015 Africa U-23 Cup of Nations in Senegal.

On 16 June 2019, he was named in Mali's 23-man squad for the 2019 Africa Cup of Nations in Egypt. On 24 June 2019, he scored in his side's 4–1 opening match win against Mauritania, coming on in the 61st minute for Adama Noss Traoré.

== Personal life ==
Traoré was an international teammate of a player of the same name, who was born in the same month. The two were also at Metz at the same time. To distinguish between them, the latter was also known as Adama Noss Traoré.

== Career statistics ==
=== Club ===
As of match played 31 August 2025

Appearances and goals by club, season and competition
Club	Season	League			National cup (Note: Includes Moldovan Cup, Magyar Kupa)		League cup (Note: Includes Coupe de la Ligue)		Continental		Other		Total	
Club	Season	Division	Apps	Goals	Apps	Goals	Apps	Goals	Apps	Goals	Apps	Goals	Apps	Goals
Metz	2018–19	Ligue 2	2	0	0	0	2	0	–		–		4	0
Orléans (loan)	2018–19	Ligue 2	6	0	0	0	–		–		–		6	0
Al-Adalah (loan)	2019–20	Saudi Pro League	16	1	0	0	–		–		–		16	1
Sheriff Tiraspol	2020–21	Divizia Națională	15	9	3	1	–		–		–		18	10
Sheriff Tiraspol	2021–22	Divizia Națională	23	8	3	0	–		16 (Note: Fourteen appearances and six goals in UEFA Champions League, two appearances and one goal in UEFA Europa League)	7	1 (Note: Appearance in Moldovan Super Cup)	0	43	14
Sheriff Tiraspol	Total		38	17	6	1	–		16	7	1	0	61	24
Ferencváros	2022–23	Nemzeti Bajnokság I	30	11	0	0	–		15 (Note: Six appearances and four goals in UEFA Champions League, nine appearances and three goals in UEFA Europa League)	7	–		45	18
Ferencváros	2023–24	Nemzeti Bajnokság I	13	7	4	1	–		10 (Note: Two appearances in UEFA Champions League, eight appearances and six goals in UEFA Europa Conference League)	6	–		27	17
Ferencváros	2024–25	Nemzeti Bajnokság I	26	3	3	0	–		16 (Note: Four appearances in UEFA Champions League, twelve appearances and two goals in UEFA Europa League)	5	–		45	8
Ferencváros	Total		69	21	7	1	–		41	17	–		117	43
Gençlerbirliği	2025–26	Süper Lig	2	0	0	0	–		–		–		2	0
Career total			133	39	13	2	2	0	57	24	1	0	207	67

=== International ===
As of match played 15 November 2024

Appearances and goals by national team and year
National team	Year	Apps	Goals
Mali	2013	3	0
Mali	2014	4	1
Mali	2015	2	0
Mali	2017	3	0
Mali	2018	5	1
Mali	2019	12	4
Mali	2020	2	0
Mali	2021	8	2
Mali	2022	8	0
Mali	2023	5	1
Mali	2024	3	0
Total		57	9

Scores and results list Mali's goal tally first, score column indicates score after each Traoré goal.

List of international goals scored by Adama Traoré
No.	Date	Venue	Opponent	Score	Result	Competition
1	11 January 2014	Cape Town Stadium, Cape Town, South Africa	Nigeria	2–0	2–1	2014 African Nations Championship
2	9 September 2018	Juba Stadium, Juba, South Sudan	South Sudan	2–0	3–0	2019 Africa Cup of Nations qualification
3	23 March 2019	Stade du 26 Mars, Bamako, Mali	South Sudan	3–0	3–0	2019 Africa Cup of Nations qualification
4	23 June 2019	Suez Stadium, Suez, Egypt	Mauritania	4–1	4–1	2019 Africa Cup of Nations
5	5 September 2019	Prince Mohamed bin Fahd Stadium, Dammam, Saudi Arabia	Saudi Arabia	1–0	1–1	Friendly
6	14 November 2019	Stade du 26 Mars, Bamako, Mali	Guinea	1–0	2–2	2021 Africa Cup of Nations qualification
7	1 September 2021	Stade Adrar, Agadir, Morocco	Rwanda	1–0	1–0	2022 FIFA World Cup qualification
8	7 October 2021	Stade Adrar, Agadir, Morocco	Kenya	1–0	5–0	2022 FIFA World Cup qualification
9	24 March 2023	Stade du 26 Mars, Bamako, Mali	Gambia	2–0	2–0	2023 Africa Cup of Nations qualification

== Honours ==
TP Mazembe

- Linafoot: 2013–14, 2015–16, 2016–17
- CAF Champions League: 2015
- CAF Confederation Cup: 2016, 2017
- CAF Super Cup: 2016

Sheriff Tiraspol

- Moldovan National Division: 2020–21, 2021–22
- Moldovan Cup: 2021–22

Ferencváros

- Nemzeti Bajnokság I: 2022–23, 2023–24, 2024–25
