= Chadrack Lukombe =

Congolese footballer (born 1997)

Personal information
- Full name: Chadrack Muzungu Lukombe
- Date of birth: 14 April 1997 (age 29)
- Place of birth: Kinshasa, Zaire
- Height: 1.79 m (5 ft 10 in)
- Position: Winger

Team information
- Current team: Al-Madina SC
- Number: 10

Senior career*
Years	Team	Apps	(Gls)
- Athletic Ujana
2017–2019	Vita Club		
2019–2020	ENPPI	16	(1)
2020–2021	Almería B	5	(0)
2020–2021	→ Boulogne (loan)	12	(0)
2020	→ Boulogne B (loan)	2	(0)
2021–2024	RS Berkane	23	(10)
2024–2025	Kelantan Darul Naim	2	

International career^{‡}
2016	DR Congo U20	5	(1)
2017	DR Congo	1	(0)
- * Club domestic league appearances and goals ‡ National team caps and goals as of 21 May 2018

Chadrack Muzungu Lukombe (born 14 April 1997) is a Congolese professional footballer who plays as a winger. He made one appearance for the DR Congo national team in 2017.

== Club career ==
In January 2019, Lukombe moved abroad after signing for ENPPI SC, after representing AS Vita Club and Athletic Club Ujana in his home country. On 31 January of the following year, he joined UD Almería and was assigned to the B-team in Tercera División.

In August 2020, Lukombe was loaned to French Championnat National side US Boulogne, with an option to buy.

== Career statistics ==
=== Club ===
As of 21 May 2018

Appearances and goals by club, season and competition
Club	Season	League			Cup		Continental		Other		Total	
Club	Season	Division	Apps	Goals	Apps	Goals	Apps	Goals	Apps	Goals	Apps	Goals
AS Vita Club	2016–17	Linafoot					4 (Note: Appearances in the CAF Champions League)	0			4	0
AS Vita Club	2017–18	Linafoot					13 (Note: Two appearances in the CAF Champions League, eleven appearances in the CAF Confederation Cup)	0			13	0
AS Vita Club	2018–19	Linafoot					1	1			1	1
AS Vita Club	Total		0	0	0	0	18	1	0	0	18	1
ENPPI	2018–19	Egyptian Premier League	12	1	0	0	0	0	0	0	12	1
ENPPI	2019–20	Egyptian Premier League	4	0	0	0	0	0	0	0	4	0
ENPPI	Total		16	1	0	0	0	0	0	0	16	1
Almería B	2019–20	Tercera División	5	0	–		–		0	0	5	0
Almería B	2020–21	Tercera División	0	0	–		–		0	0	0	0
Almería B	Total		5	0	0	0	0	0	0	0	5	0
Boulogne (loan)	2020–21	Championnat National	12	0	0	0	–		0	0	12	0
Boulogne B (loan)	2020–21	Championnat National 3	2	0	–		–		0	0	2	0
Career total			35	1	0	0	18	1	0	0	53	2

=== International ===
As of matches played 5 April 2021

Appearances and goals by national team and year
National team	Year	Apps	Goals
DR Congo	2017	1	0
Total		1	0

== Honours ==
RS Berkane

- Moroccan Throne Cup: 2020–21, 2021–22
- CAF Confederation Cup: 2021–22
- CAF Super Cup: 2022
