= Edo Kayembe =

Congolese footballer

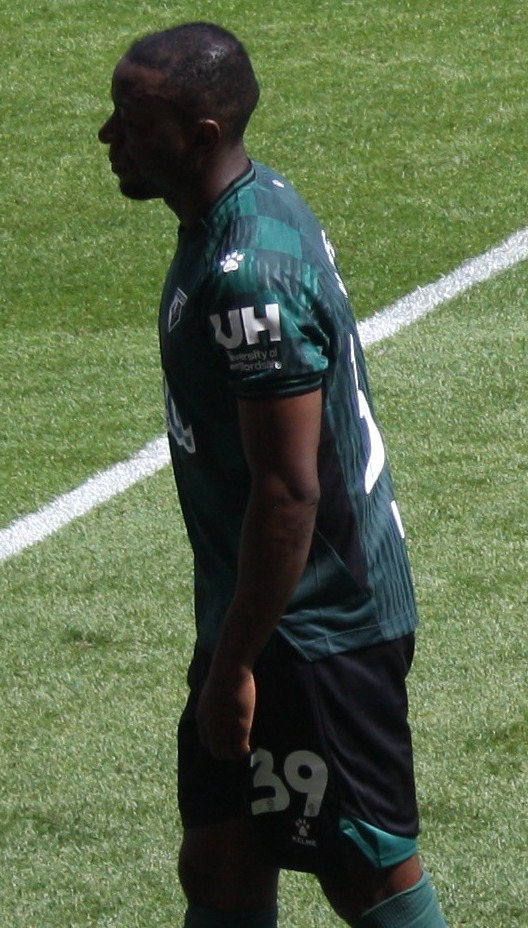
- Kayembe playing for Watford in 2025

Personal information
- Full name: Edouard Kayembe
- Date of birth: 3 June 1998 (age 28)
- Place of birth: Kananga, DR Congo
- Height: 1.83 m (6 ft 0 in)
- Position: Midfielder

Team information
- Current team: Watford
- Number: 39

Youth career
- AS Efokan
- US Tshinkunku
- SC Rojolu
- –2017: Sharks XI FC

Senior career*
Years	Team	Apps	(Gls)
2017–2020	Anderlecht	31	(0)
2020–2022	Eupen	40	(4)
2022–	Watford	161	(18)

International career^{‡}
2019	DR Congo U23	2	(0)
2019–	DR Congo	49	(3)
- * Club domestic league appearances and goals as of 22 October 2026 ‡ National team caps and goals as of 12 November 2026

Edouard Kayembe (born 3 June 1998) is a Congolese professional footballer who plays as a midfielder for EFL Championship club Watford and the DR Congo national team.

== Club career ==
Kayembe signed his first professional contract on 22 November 2016 with R.S.C. Anderlecht for 4.5 years, joining from the Congolese club Sharks XI FC. He made his professional debut for Anderlecht in a 1–0 Belgian First Division A win over K.A.S. Eupen on 22 December 2017.

On 7 January 2022, Kayembe joined Premier League club Watford on an eight and-a-half-year contract.

Kayembe scored his first goal for Watford FC on 11 November 2023 during a league match against Rotherham United FC. As a starter, he contributed to his team's 5–0 victory.

On 22 May 2026, Watford said it had triggered a one-year extension to his contract.

== International career ==
Kayembe was called up to the DR Congo U20s for the 2017 Jeux de la Francophonie, but did not end up going to the tournament. He represented the DR Congo U23s in a pair of 2019 Africa U-23 Cup of Nations qualification matches in March 2019.

Kayembe made his senior debut for the DR Congo national football team in a friendly 1–1 draw with Algeria on 10 October 2019.

On 19 May 2026, he was included in the 26-man squad selected by head coach Sébastien Desabre to represent the DR Congo at the 2026 FIFA World Cup.

== Career statistics ==
=== Club ===
As of match played 19 September 2026

Appearances and goals by club, season and competition
Club	Season	League			National cup (Note: Includes Belgian Cup, FA Cup)		League cup (Note: Includes EFL Cup)		Europe		Other		Total	
Club	Season	Division	Apps	Goals	Apps	Goals	Apps	Goals	Apps	Goals	Apps	Goals	Apps	Goals
Anderlecht	2017–18	Belgian Pro League	1	0	0	0	—		0	0	0	0	1	0
Anderlecht	2018–19	Belgian Pro League	12	0	1	0	—		2 (Note: Appearances in UEFA Europa League)	0	—		15	0
Anderlecht	2019–20	Belgian Pro League	18	0	3	0	—		—		—		21	0
Anderlecht	2020–21	Belgian Pro League	2	0	0	0	—		—		—		2	0
Anderlecht	Total		33	0	4	0	—		2	0	0	0	39	0
KAS Eupen	2020–21	Belgian Pro League	23	0	3	0	—		—		—		26	0
KAS Eupen	2021–22	Belgian Pro League	17	4	2	0	—		—		—		19	4
KAS Eupen	Total		40	4	5	0	—		0	0	0	0	45	4
Watford	2021–22	Premier League	13	0	0	0	0	0	—		—		13	0
Watford	2022–23	Championship	21	0	0	0	1	0	—		—		22	0
Watford	2023–24	Championship	35	5	0	0	1	0	—		—		36	5
Watford	2024–25	Championship	44	8	1	0	1	0	—		—		46	8
Watford	2025–26	Championship	37	4	0	0	1	0	—		—		38	4
Watford	2026–27	Championship	8	1	0	0	2	0	—		—		10	1
Watford	Total		150	18	1	0	6	0	—		—		157	18
Career total			223	22	10	0	6	0	2	0	0	0	241	22

=== International ===
As of match played 12 November 2026

Appearances and goals by national team and year
National team	Year	Apps	Goals
DR Congo	2019	1	0
DR Congo	2020	1	0
DR Congo	2021	6	0
DR Congo	2022	6	1
DR Congo	2023	4	0
DR Congo	2024	7	1
DR Congo	2025	13	0
DR Congo	2026	11	1
Total		49	3

Scores and results list DR Congo's goal tally first.

List of international goals scored by Edo Kayembe
No.	Date	Venue	Opponent	Score	Result	Competition
1.	27 September 2022	Stade Père Jégo, Casablanca, Morocco	Sierra Leone	2–0	3–0	Friendly
2.	6 September 2024	Stade des Martyrs, Kinshasa, DR Congo	Guinea	1–0	1–0	2025 Africa Cup of Nations qualification
3.	12 November 2026	Stade des Martyrs, Kinshasa, DR Congo	Sierra Leone	3–0	3–1	2027 Africa Cup of Nations qualification
