= Boubacar Diarra (footballer, born 1994) =

Malian footballer

Personal information
- Full name: Boubacar Diarra
- Date of birth: 18 April 1994 (age 32)
- Place of birth: Bamako, Mali
- Height: 1.83 m (6 ft 0 in)
- Position: Defensive midfielder

Team information
- Current team: Horoya AC

Youth career
- AS Revenant

Senior career*
Years	Team	Apps	(Gls)
2013	AS Korofina		
2013–2016	TP Mazembe		
2016	Club Africain	13	(2)
2016–2017	Wadi Degla		
2017–2018	Lierse	16	(0)
2018–2019	Al-Hilal Club		
2019	Najran		
2019	NEROCA FC	12	(4)
2020–	Horoya AC		

International career^{‡}
2013	Mali U20	3	(0)
2015	Mali U23		
2014–	Mali	1	(0)
- * Club domestic league appearances and goals as of 17:18, 3 July 2020 (UTC) ‡ National team caps and goals as of 15:57, 4 September 2019 (UTC)

Boubacar Diarra (born 18 April 1994) is a Malian footballer who plays as a defensive midfielder for Horoya AC.

== Club career ==
Diarra's career began in Mali with AS Revenant and AS Korofina, he then left his homeland to go to the DR Congo to join Linafoot team TP Mazembe. During his time with TP Mazembe, Diarra won the 2013 Linafoot, the 2013–14 Linafoot and the 2015 CAF Champions League. He departed in 2016 to join Tunisian Ligue Professionnelle 1 outfit Club Africain, making his debut in a defeat to Stade Tunisien on 17 February 2016. Six months and thirteen appearances later, Diarra was on the move again as he signed for Wadi Degla of the Egyptian Premier League. On 19 January 2017, Diarra completed a transfer to Wadi Degla's sister club Lierse.

He made his Lierse debut on 27 January in a league match against OH Leuven. In October 2018, Diarra joined Sudan Premier League side Al-Hilal Club. A move to Saudi Arabia and Najran of the Prince Mohammad bin Salman League occurred on 26 June 2019. However, in the succeeding September, Diarra headed to I-League club NEROCA; having terminated his Najran contract. He netted goals against Chennai City, East Bengal, TRAU and Real Kashmir across 2019–20.

== International career ==
Diarra has represented Mali at U20, U23 and senior level. He won three caps for the U20s during the 2013 FIFA U-20 World Cup in Turkey. He made his senior debut on 29 June 2016 in a friendly against China at the Shenzhen Stadium.

== Career statistics ==
=== Club ===
As of 3 July 2020.

Club statistics
Club	Season	League			Cup		League Cup		Continental		Other		Total	
Club	Season	Division	Apps	Goals	Apps	Goals	Apps	Goals	Apps	Goals	Apps	Goals	Apps	Goals
Lierse	2016–17	First Division B	5	0	—		—		—		8 (Note: Appearance(s) in the Belgian First Division A play-offs)	0	13	0
Lierse	2017–18	First Division B	11	0	0	0	—		—		2	0	13	0
Lierse	Total		16	0	0	0	—		—		10	0	26	0
NEROCA	2019–20	I-League	12	4	0	0	0	0	—		0	0	12	4
Career total			28	4	0	0	0	0	—		10	0	38	4

=== International ===
As of 27 October 2018.

National team	Year	Apps	Goals
Mali
Mali	2014	1	0
Total		1	0

== Honours ==
TP Mazembe

- Linafoot (2): 2013, 2013–14
- CAF Champions League: 2015
