= Patrice Carteron =

French football manager (born 1970)

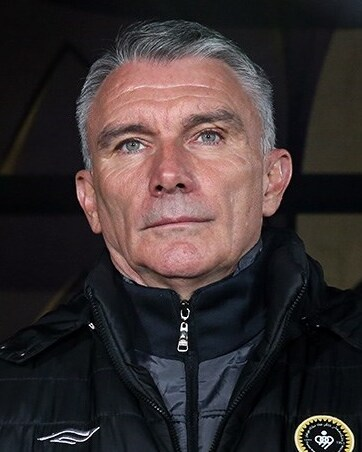
- Carteron in 2025

Personal information
- Date of birth: 30 July 1970 (age 56)
- Place of birth: Saint-Brieuc, Côtes-d'Armor, France
- Height: 1.82 m (6 ft 0 in)
- Position: Defender

Youth career
- –1994: Laval

Senior career*
Years	Team	Apps	(Gls)
1994–1997	Rennes	118	(5)
1997–2000	Lyon	120	(11)
2000–2005	Saint-Étienne	142	(19)
2000–2001	→ Sunderland (loan)	8	(1)
2005–2007	Cannes	49	(2)
Total		437	(38)

Managerial career
- 2008–2009: Cannes
- 2009–2012: Dijon
- 2012–2013: Mali
- 2013–2016: TP Mazembe
- 2016: Wadi Degla
- 2017: Al-Nassr
- 2017–2018: Phoenix Rising
- 2018: Al Ahly
- 2019: Raja CA
- 2019–2020: Zamalek
- 2020–2021: Al-Taawoun
- 2021–2022: Zamalek
- 2022–2023: Al-Ettifaq
- 2023–2024: Umm Salal
- 2024–2025: Sepahan
- 2025–2026: Umm Salal
- 2026: Wydad AC
Medal record
Men's football
Representing Mali (as manager)
Africa Cup of Nations
Bronze medal – third place	2013	{{{2}}}
- * Club domestic league appearances and goals

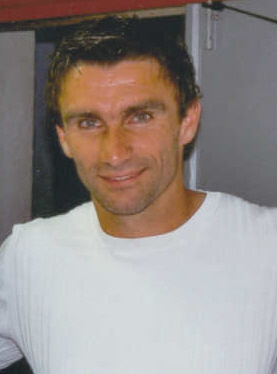
Carteron in 2004–05

Patrice Carteron (born 30 July 1970) is a French football manager and former player. Some of his previous managerial posts include the Mali national team, Dijon, Al Ahly, Umm Salal, Al-Nassr and Al-Ettifaq. He played as a defender.

== Coaching career ==
=== Cannes ===
In 2007, Carteron took over as manager for Cannes, but was replaced by Albert Emon in June 2009.

=== Dijon ===
On 25 June 2009, Dijon hired the former Cannes coach. During his time with Dijon, he got the club promoted to the French top flight. On 24 May 2012, he parted company with Dijon, who had been relegated from the top division Ligue 1.

=== Mali national team ===
on 12 July 2012, he was named as the head coach of Mali, where he led the African nation to a FIFA rank as high as 21. Mali also finished third in the African Cup of Nations during his tenure.

=== Mazembe ===
On 22 May 2013, he agreed to take charge of Congolese champions TP Mazembe, signing a two-year contract. Mazembe confirmed that Carteron would become their new head coach, while continuing his duties with Mali. With Mazembe, Carteron led the club to two league titles and one African Champions League title.

On 7 January 2016, Carteron left TP Mazembe as his contract had run out.

=== Wadi Degla ===
After leaving Mazembe, Carteron took over at Wadi Degla in the 2016–17 season. The team won 20 of their 30 matches during Carteron's tenure.

=== Al-Nassr ===
In 2017, Carteron moved on to Al-Nassr, where he led the club to a third-place finish in the Saudi Professional League, thus qualifying for the Asian Champions League.

=== Phoenix Rising ===
On 22 May 2017, United Soccer League club Phoenix Rising announced Carteron would take over head coaching duties, and would join the club as early as the first week of June.

=== Al Ahly ===
On 12 June 2018, the nab team Al Ahly officially announced the signing of Carteron to take the seat of the manager for two years.

Following Al Ahly's loss at the 2018 CAF Champions League Final and the team's knockout from the Arab Club Champions Cup, he was sacked on 23 November 2018.

=== Raja CA ===
Carteron was appointed coach of three times CAF Confederation Cup winner Raja CA on 30 January 2019. Two months later, he won the African Super Cup against Espérence de Tunis, the second in Raja's history.

=== Zamalek ===
On 3 December 2019, Carteron was revealed as the new manager of Egyptian Premier League side Zamalek, succeeding Milutin Sredojević.

He won the CAF Super Cup 2020 against Espérence de Tunis, the fourth in Zamalek's history. After six days he won the 2019–20 Egyptian Super Cup against Al Ahly, the fourth in Zamalek's history, winning two one-match trophies in a one-week span. On 13 June 2020, he renewed his contract with Zamalek for one more season until 2020–21.

On 15 September 2020, Carteron announced his departure from the club putting an end to this spell in his managerial career.

Prior to his resignation, Carteron claimed that his decision was due to personal reasons; however, the sudden resignation was both surprising and shocking to Zamalek's board and fans, a few days after a 1–0 win over El Entag El Harby, since the club had only one month before their semi-final matches against Raja CA in the 2019–20 CAF Champions League. Hence, the club's president Mortada Mansour offered him either to improve his contract to match any counter offer, or to stay until Zamalek complete the CAF Champions League campaign. Eventually, Carteron mentioned that his decision to leave was already taken, and that Zamalek still have time to prepare for their upcoming matches, then he would pay the release clause immediately. Later on, Mortada Mansour accused Carteron of lying regarding that he had not an offer already, and that Al-Taawoun's president, Muhammad Al-Qasim, was trying to sabotage Zamalek.

=== Al-Taawoun ===
On 16 September 2020, Saudi club Al-Taawoun announced the signing of Carteron. On 18 September, he managed his first match with Al-Taawoun in a 1–0 defeat against Persepolis, followed by another heavy defeat 6–0 against Sharjah in the 2020 AFC Champions League. Later on, he won his first match with Al-Taawoun against Al-Duhail 1–0 to reach the round of 16 of the Champions League.

=== Return to Zamalek ===
On 12 March 2021, Zamalek appointed Carteron as manager for the second time. On 24 August 2021, he led Zamalek to secure their 13th league title after a 2–0 win over El Entag El Harby.

=== Al-Ettifaq ===
On 4 March 2022, Al-Ettifaq announced the signing of Carteron to lead the first football team until the end of the 2021–22 season. A few days earlier, Mortada Mansour, president of Zamalek club, had announced the termination of the contract with Carteron by mutual consent.

On 26 February 2023, Carteron and Al-Ettifaq agreed to end their contract mutually.

=== Umm Salal ===
On 16 June 2023, Carteron became the head coach of Qatar Stars League club Umm Salal.

=== Sepahan ===
In November 2024, Carteron was appointed head coach of the Iranian club Sepahan after signing a two-year contract.

=== Return to Umm Salal ===
In June 2025, Carteron was reappointed as head coach of Qatari side Umm Salal.

=== Wydad AC ===
Carteron served as head coach of Botola Pro side Wydad AC for a month before being sacked by late April 2026 following a five-match winless streak.

== Managerial statistics ==
As of 30 April 2026

Managerial record by team and tenure
Team	From	To	P	W	D	L	Win %
Cannes	10 March 2008	30 June 2009	54	13	18	23	24.07
Dijon	1 July 2009	24 May 2012	123	43	35	45	34.96
Mali	12 July 2012	25 May 2013	10	5	2	3	50.00
TP Mazembe	26 May 2013	7 January 2016	49	26	10	13	53.06
Wadi Degla	16 January 2016	7 November 2016	32	16	9	7	50.00
Al-Nassr	29 January 2017	4 June 2017	13	7	2	4	53.85
Phoenix Rising	5 June 2017	11 June 2018	41	20	14	7	48.78
Al Ahly	12 June 2018	23 November 2018	23	13	7	3	56.52
Raja CA	30 January 2019	10 November 2019	41	18	14	9	43.90
Zamalek	3 December 2019	15 September 2020	31	18	10	3	58.06
Al-Taawoun	16 September 2020	12 March 2021	28	11	8	9	39.29
Zamalek	12 March 2021	28 February 2022	25	19	4	2	76.00
Al-Ettifaq	4 March 2022	26 February 2023	27	8	6	13	29.63
Umm Salal	16 June 2023	19 November 2024	46	20	11	15	43.48
Sepahan	27 November 2024	25 June 2025	24	13	9	2	54.17
Umm Salal	1 July 2025	22 January 2026	24	9	2	13	37.50
Wydad AC	24 March 2026	30 April 2026	5	0	2	3	0.00
Total			554	241	153	160	43.50

== Honours ==
=== Player ===
Lyon

- UEFA Intertoto Cup: 1997

Saint-Étienne

- Ligue 2: 2003–04

=== Manager ===
TP Mazembe

- Linafoot: 2012–13, 2013–14
- CAF Champions League: 2015

Raja CA

- CAF Super Cup: 2019

Zamalek

- Egyptian Premier League: 2020–21
- Egyptian Super Cup: 2019
- CAF Super Cup: 2020

Umm Salal

- Qatari Stars Cup: 2023—24

Sepahan

- Iranian Super Cup: 2024
