= 2018 Coupe du Congo =

2018 Coupe du Congo may refer to:

- 2018 Coupe du Congo (DR Congo), 2018 knockout cup football competition of the Democratic Republic of the Congo
- 2018 Coupe du Congo (Republic of Congo), 2018 knockout cup football competition of the Republic of the Congo
