= Jackson Muleka =

Congolese footballer

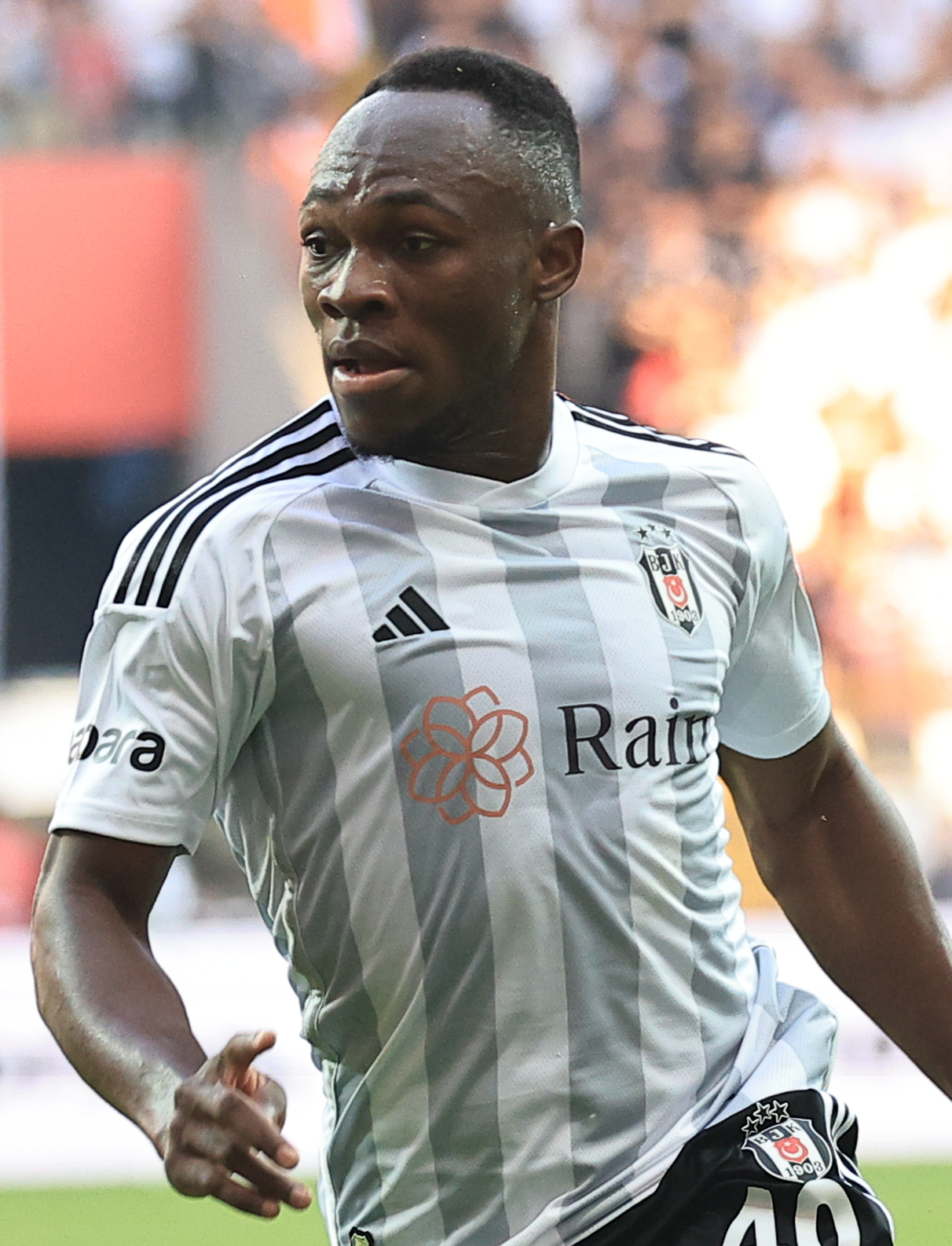
- Muleka with Beşiktaş, 2023

Personal information
- Full name: Jackson Muleka Kyanvubu
- Date of birth: 4 October 1999 (age 27)
- Place of birth: Lubumbashi, DR Congo
- Height: 1.80 m (5 ft 11 in)
- Position: Striker

Team information
- Current team: Konyaspor
- Number: 40

Youth career
- –2017: Ecofoot Katumbi

Senior career*
Years	Team	Apps	(Gls)
2017–2020	TP Mazembe	85	(57)
2020–2022	Standard Liège	38	(9)
2022	→ Kasımpaşa (loan)	14	(12)
2022–2025	Beşiktaş	60	(9)
2024–2025	→ Al-Kholood (loan)	29	(7)
2025	Al-Kholood	0	(0)
2025–	Konyaspor	29	(6)

International career^{‡}
	DR Congo U20	2	(0)
2018	DR Congo U23	4	(4)
2019–	DR Congo	16	(3)
- * Club domestic league appearances and goals as of 10 June 2026 ‡ National team caps and goals as of 11:44, 17 October 2023 (UTC)

Jackson Muleka Kyanvubu (born 4 October 1999) is a Congolese professional footballer who plays as a striker for Turkish Süper Lig club Konyaspor and the DR Congo national team.

== Club career ==
=== Kasımpaşa ===
On 8 February 2022, Muleka was loaned to Kasımpaşa in Turkey until June 2022, without an option to buy.

=== Beşiktaş ===
On July 7, 2022, Muleka signed a 5-year deal with Süper Lig club Beşiktaş. For Muleka's transfer Beşiktaş paid €3.500.000 to Standard Liège.

=== Al-Kholood ===
On 22 August 2024, Muleka was loaned to Saudi Arabian club Al-Kholood until the end of the season with an option to buy.

Muleka joined Al-Kholood for €1.5 million after a loan with a mandatory purchase clause.

=== Konyaspor ===
On 20 August 2025, Muleka signed a 2-year deal with Süper Lig club Konyaspor.

== Career statistics ==
=== Club ===
As of match played 6 March 2025

Appearances and goals by club, season and competition
Club	Season	League			National cup (Note: Includes Belgian Cup, Turkish Cup, King's Cup)		Continental		Other		Total	
Club	Season	Division	Apps	Goals	Apps	Goals	Apps	Goals	Apps	Goals	Apps	Goals
TP Mazembe	2017–18	Linafoot					6 (Note: Appearances in CAF Champions League)	2	1 (Note: Appearance in CAF Super Cup)	0		
TP Mazembe	2018–19	Linafoot		24			12	5				
TP Mazembe	2019–20	Linafoot		12			10	7				
TP Mazembe	Total						38	14			85	57
Standard Liège	2020–21	Belgian Pro League	19	7	5	3	5 (Note: Appearances in UEFA Europa League)	0	4 (Note: Appearances in Belgian First Division play-offs)	2	33	12
Standard Liège	2021–22	Belgian Pro League	19	2	2	1	0	0	–		21	3
Standard Liège	Total		38	9	7	4	5	0	4	2	54	15
Kasımpaşa (loan)	2021–22	Süper Lig	14	12	0	0	–		–		14	12
Beşiktaş	2022–23	Süper Lig	29	5	3	1	–		–		32	6
Beşiktaş	2023–24	Süper Lig	30	4	5	2	12 (Note: Appearances in UEFA Europa Conference League)	3	–		47	9
Beşiktaş	2024–25	Süper Lig	1	0	0	0	0	0	0	0	1	0
Beşiktaş	Total		60	9	8	3	12	3	0	0	80	15
Al-Kholood (loan)	2024–25	Saudi Pro League	19	5	1	0	—		—		20	5
Al-Kholood	2025–26	Saudi Pro League	0	0	0	0	—		—		0	0
Career total			130	35	12	7	55	17	5	2	252	106

=== International ===
As of matches played 17 October 2023

Appearances and goals by national team and year
National team	Year	Apps	Goals
DR Congo	2019	5	3
DR Congo	2021	5	0
DR Congo	2022	2	0
DR Congo	2023	3	0
Total		16	3

Scores and results list DR Congo's goal tally first, score column indicates score after each Muleka goal.

List of international goals scored by Jackson Muleka
No.	Date	Venue	Opponent	Score	Result	Competition
1	22 September 2019	Barthélemy Boganda Stadium, Bangui, Central African Republic	Central African Republic	2–0	2–0	2020 African Nations Championship qualification
2	20 October 2019	Stade des Martyrs, Kinshasa, Democratic Republic of the Congo	Central African Republic	4–0	4–1	2020 African Nations Championship qualification
3	18 November 2019	Independence Stadium, Bakau, The Gambia	Gambia	2–1	2–2	2021 Africa Cup of Nations qualification Group D

== Honours ==
Beşiktaş

- Turkish Cup: 2023–24
- Turkish Super Cup: 2024

Individual

- Linafoot Top scorer: 2018–19, 2019–20
- CAF Champions League Top Goalscorer: 2019–20
