= 2020–21 KAS Eupen season =

K.A.S. Eupen
2020–21 season
- Owner: ASPIRE Zone Foundation
- Chairman: Dieter Steffens
- Manager: Beñat San José
- Stadium: Kehrwegstadion
- Belgian First Division A: 12th
- Belgian Cup: Semi-finals
- Top goalscorer: League: Smail Prevljak (15); All: Smail Prevljak (15)
Home colours	Away colours	Third colours

The 2020–21 K.A.S. Eupen season was the club's 76th season in existence and its 5th consecutive season in the top flight of Belgian football. In addition to the domestic league, Eupen participated in this season's edition of the Belgian Cup. The season covered the period from 1 July 2020 to 30 June 2021.

== Players ==
=== First-team squad ===
As of 30 January 2021

Note: Flags indicate national team as defined under FIFA eligibility rules; some limited exceptions apply. Players may hold more than one non-FIFA nationality.

No.	Pos.	Nation	Player
1	GK	GER	Robin Himmelmann
3	DF	NED	Menno Koch
4	DF	BEL	Rocky Bushiri (on loan from Norwich City)
5	DF	ESP	Jordi Amat
6	DF	FRA	Benoît Poulain
7	FW	BEL	Julien Ngoy
8	MF	BEL	Stef Peeters
9	FW	BIH	Smail Prevljak
10	FW	ZIM	Knowledge Musona
11	FW	SEN	Amara Baby
13	MF	MLI	Sibiry Keita
15	DF	BEL	Gary Magnée
17	FW	GBS	Carlos Embaló
18	MF	MNE	Aleksandar Boljević (on loan from Standard Liège)
20	MF	BEL	Marciano Aziz

No.	Pos.	Nation	Player
21	DF	BRA	Adriano Correia
22	DF	CIV	Emmanuel Agbadou
23	DF	CGO	Senna Miangué (on loan from Cagliari)
24	DF	CIV	Silas Gnaka
25	DF	GHA	Emmanuel Sowah Adjei
26	MF	BEL	Jens Cools
28	DF	BEL	Jonathan Heris
31	GK	BEL	Théo Defourny
32	DF	GER	Andreas Beck
33	GK	GHA	Abdul Nurudeen
34	FW	CIV	Konan N'Dri
35	DF	BEL	Boris Lambert
39	MF	COD	Edo Kayembe
77	FW	CIV	Mamadou Koné

== Pre-season and friendlies ==
Win Draw Loss

8 July 2020 Friendly	Antwerp (Belgium)	0–1	(Belgium) Eupen	Antwerp, Belgium
18:00 CEST (UTC+2)				Stadium: Bosuilstadion

18 July 2020 Friendly	Eupen (Belgium)	0–2	(Belgium) Union Saint-Gilloise	Eupen, Belgium
16:00 CEST (UTC+2)				Stadium: Stade Communal

31 July 2020 Friendly	Eupen (Belgium)	2–2	(Belgium) Sint-Truiden	Eupen, Belgium
18:00 CEST (UTC+2)				Stadium: Kehrwegstadion

22 August 2020 Friendly	Eupen (Belgium)	Cancelled	(Belgium) URSL Visé	Eupen, Belgium
11:30 CEST (UTC+2)				Stadium: Kehrwegstadion

4 September 2020 Friendly	Eupen (Belgium)	5–3	(Belgium) RWD Molenbeek	Eupen, Belgium
12:30 CEST (UTC+2)				Stadium: Kehrwegstadion

== Competitions ==
=== Overview ===
Competition	First match	Last match	Starting round	Final position	Record							
Competition	First match	Last match	Starting round	Final position	Pld	W	D	L	GF	GA	GD	Win %
Belgian First Division A	10 August 2020	17 April 2021	Matchday 1	12th	34	10	13	11	44	55	−11	29.41
Belgian Cup	2 February 2021	13 March 2021	Sixth round	Semi-finals	4	3	0	1	11	2	+9	75.00
Total					38	13	13	12	55	57	−2	34.21

Source: Soccerway

=== Belgian First Division A ===
==== League table ====
Pos	Team	Pld	W	D	L	GF	GA	GD	Pts
10	Zulte Waregem	34	14	4	16	53	69	−16	46
11	OH Leuven	34	12	9	13	54	59	−5	45
12	Eupen	34	10	13	11	44	55	−11	43
13	Charleroi	34	11	9	14	46	49	−3	42
14	Kortrijk	34	11	6	17	44	57	−13	39

Source: Jupiler Pro League (in Dutch), Soccerway
Rules for classification: 1) Points; 2) Matches won; 3) Goal difference; 4) Goals scored; 5) Away matches won; 6) Away goal difference; 7) Away goals scored; 8) Play-off.

==== Results summary ====
Overall								Home						Away					
Pld	W	D	L	GF	GA	GD	Pts	W	D	L	GF	GA	GD	W	D	L	GF	GA	GD
34	10	13	11	44	55	−11	43	5	6	6	24	30	−6	5	7	5	20	25	−5

Source: Jupiler Pro League

==== Results by round ====
Round	1	2	3	4	5	6	7	8	9	10	11	12	13	14	15	16	17	18	19	20	21	22	23	24	25	26	27	28	29	30	31	32	33	34
Ground	A	H	A	H	H	A	A	H	A	H	A	H	A	H	A	H	A	H	A	A	H	H	A	H	H	A	A	H	A	H	H	A	H	A
Result	D	L	D	D	W	D	D	L	W	D	L	D	D	W	W	L	D	L	L	W	W	W	L	L	D	D	L	D	W	D	W	L	L	W
Position	9	15	16	16	12	12	12	13	12	12	13	13	13	13	10	13	13	14	14	14	13	13	13	14	14	14	14	14	14	13	13	13	14	12

Source: Jupiler Pro League
A = Away; H = Home; W = Win; D = Draw; L = Loss

==== Matches ====
The league fixtures were announced on 8 July 2020.

10 August 2020 1	OH Leuven	1–1	Eupen	Leuven
19:00 CEST (UTC+2)	Kotysch 57'; Myny (yellow card) 60'	Report	Nuhu (yellow card) 48', (goal) 72'; Peeters (yellow card) 56'	Stadium: Den Dreef; Attendance: 0 Referee: Lothar D'Hondt

16 August 2020 2	Eupen	0–4	Club Brugge	Eupen
16:00 CEST (UTC+2)		Report	Badji 14'; Diatta 59', 69'; Vormer 76'	Stadium: Kehrwegstadion; Attendance: 0 Referee: Erik Lambrechts

21 August 2020 3	Kortrijk	0–0	Eupen	Kortrijk
19:00 CEST (UTC+2)	Selemani (yellow card) 72'; Rougeaux (yellow card) 88'	Report	Musona (yellow card) 30'; Cools (yellow card) 90+3'	Stadium: Guldensporen Stadion; Attendance: 0 Referee: Jan Boterberg

29 August 2020 4	Eupen	1–1	Sint-Truiden	Eupen
16:15 CEST (UTC+2)	Cools (yellow card) 10'; Ngoy 13'; Heris (red card) 25'; Beck (yellow card) 45+1'; Koné (yellow card) 82'; Poulain (yellow card) 84'	Report	Asamoah (yellow card) 16'; Lucas (yellow card) 58'; Mmaee (yellow card) 63'; Colidio (yellow card) 72'; Suzuki 85' (pen.)	Stadium: Kehrwegstadion; Attendance: 0 Referee: Bert Put

11 September 2020 5	Eupen	2–1	Gent	Eupen
20:45 CEST (UTC+2)	Prevljak 35'; Cools 53', (yellow card) 84'; Adriano (yellow card) 71'; Amat (yellow card) 78'	Report	Kums 63', (yellow card) 75'; Ngadeu-Ngadjui (red card) 73'; Botaka (yellow card) 76'; Arslanagić (yellow card) 88'	Stadium: Kehrwegstadion; Attendance: 1,038; Referee: Nathan Verboomen

20 September 2020 6	Antwerp	2–2	Eupen	Antwerp
20:45 CEST (UTC+2)	De Laet (yellow card) 45+1'; Mbokani (yellow card) 45+5'; Pius 62', 77'	Report	Musona (yellow card) 35', (goal) 53'; Prevljak 45+2' (pen.), (yellow card) 65'; Koné (yellow card) 45+5'; Amat (yellow card) 69'; Ngoy (yellow card) 86'; Poulain (yellow card) 89'	Stadium: Bosuilstadion; Attendance: 3,800; Referee: Bram Van Driessche

27 September 2020 7	Anderlecht	1–1	Eupen	Anderlecht
16:00 CEST (UTC+2)	Doku (yellow card) 38'; Lokonga 71'; El Hadj (yellow card) 90+3'	Report	Adriano (yellow card) 58'; Peeters (yellow card) 81'; Koch (yellow card) 89'; Ngoy 90'; Vázquez (yellow card) 90+4'	Stadium: Constant Vanden Stock Stadium; Attendance: 6,000; Referee: Kevin Dhondt

3 October 2020 8	Eupen	1–2	Cercle Brugge	Eupen
18:30 CEST (UTC+2)	Peeters (yellow card) 14'; Musona (yellow card) 31'; Ngoy 39'; Amat (yellow card) 43'; Koch (yellow card) 84'; Adriano (yellow card) 90'	Report	Hazard 5', (yellow card) 47'; Taravel (yellow card) 46'; Musaba 76'; Somers (yellow card) 89'; Ugbo (yellow card) 90+3'	Stadium: Kehrwegstadion; Attendance: 1,340; Referee: Jasper Vergoote

18 October 2020 9	Excel Mouscron	0–2	Eupen	Mouscron
16:00 CEST (UTC+2)		Report	Musona 47'; Heris 79'	Stadium: Stade Le Canonnier; Attendance: 500; Referee: Wesli De Cremer

30 October 2020 11	Genk	4–0	Eupen	Genk
20:45 CET (UTC+1)	Onuachu 5' (pen.); Dessers 48'; Bongonda 74', 82'; Wouters (yellow card) 81'	Report	N'Dri (yellow card) 70'; Kayembe (yellow card) 90+1'	Stadium: Luminus Arena; Attendance: 0 Referee: Bram Van Driessche

7 November 2020 12	Eupen	1–1	Waasland-Beveren	Eupen
18:30 CET (UTC+1)	Peeters (yellow card) 74'; Koch 84'	Report	Frey 11'; Vukčević (yellow card) 88'; Vukotić (yellow card) 90+2'	Stadium: Kehrwegstadion; Attendance: 0 Referee: Lothar D'hondt

21 November 2020 13	Standard Liège	2–2	Eupen	Liège
16:15 CET (UTC+1)	Bokadi 35'; Shamir (yellow card) 41', (red card) 45'; Bodart 90+6'	Report	Prevljak 36'; Peeters 57'	Stadium: Stade Maurice Dufrasne; Attendance: 0 Referee: Bert Put

27 November 2020 14	Eupen	3–1	Charleroi	Eupen
20:45 CET (UTC+1)	Prevljak 18'; Penneteau 48' (o.g.); Ngoy 75'; Heris (yellow card) 90+2'	Report	Willems (yellow card) 45+1'; Gillet (yellow card) 52'; Morioka (yellow card) 70'; Kayembe 85'; Gholizadeh (yellow card) 87'; Nkuba (yellow card) 90'	Stadium: Kehrwegstadion; Attendance: 0 Referee: Nicolas Laforge

3 December 2020 10	Eupen	1–1	KV Mechelen	Eupen
17:00 CET (UTC+1)	Ngoy 20'	Report	Vanlerberghe (yellow card) 78'; Van Damme (yellow card) 88'; Schoofs 90+2'	Stadium: Kehrwegstadion; Attendance: 0 Referee: Jasper Vergoote

6 December 2020 15	Beerschot	0–1	Eupen	Antwerp
16:00 CET (UTC+1)	Mboko (yellow card) 40'; Vorogovskiy (yellow card) 40'; Bourdin (yellow card) 86'	Report	Agbadou 35'; Ngoy (yellow card) 54'; Schouterden (yellow card) 61'	Stadium: Olympisch Stadion; Attendance: 0 Referee: Jonathan Lardot

26 December 2020 19	Club Brugge	3–0	Eupen	Bruges
20:00 CET (UTC+1)	Lang 52', 58'; Vanaken (red card) 79'; Okereke 82'	Report	Cools (yellow card) 45+2'; Koch (yellow card) 49'	Stadium: Jan Breydel Stadium; Attendance: 0 Referee: Nathan Verboomen

29 December 2020 16	Eupen	2–3	Zulte Waregem	Eupen
20:45 CET (UTC+1)	Musona 34', 57'; Koch (yellow card) 60'; N'Dri (yellow card) 80'; Prevljak (yellow card) 86'	Report	Bruno (yellow card) 33', (goal) 82'; Seck (yellow card) 56'; Dompé 75'; Deschacht 84'	Stadium: Kehrwegstadion; Attendance: 0 Referee: Wim Smet

6 January 2021 18	Eupen	1–4	Genk	Eupen
20:45 CET (UTC+1)	Peeters 14'; Kayembe (yellow card) 45+4'; Defourny (yellow card) 47'; Amat (yellow card) 62'	Report	Ito 9'; Onuachu 42', 48' (pen.), 60' (pen.); Kouassi (yellow card) 45+1'	Stadium: Kehrwegstadion; Attendance: 0 Referee: Bram Van Driessche

9 January 2021 30	Cercle Brugge	1–2	Eupen	Bruges
18:30 CET (UTC+1)	Hoggas 53'	Report	Prevljak 69', 76'	Stadium: Jan Breydel Stadium; Attendance: 0 Referee: Jan Boterberg

12 January 2021 17	Oostende	1–1	Eupen	Ostend
20:45 CET (UTC+1)	Kvasina 79'	Report	Prevljak 49'	Stadium: Diaz Arena; Attendance: 0 Referee: Kevin Van Damme

15 January 2021 20	Eupen	2–0	Anderlecht	Eupen
20:45 CET (UTC+1)	Peeters (yellow card) 40'; Prevljak 75', 85'; N'Dri (yellow card) 90+2'	Report	Vlap (yellow card) 14'; Lawrence (red card) 39'; Wellenreuther (yellow card) 41'; Miazga (yellow card) 90'	Stadium: Kehrwegstadion; Attendance: 0 Referee: Alexandre Boucaut

20 January 2021 21	Eupen	3–1	Beerschot	Eupen
18:45 CET (UTC+1)	Prevljak 10'; N'Dri 40'; Koch 54'	Report	Noubissi 2'; Brogno (red card) 71'; Van den Buijs (yellow card) 80'; Eleke (yellow card) 90+1'	Stadium: Kehrwegstadion; Attendance: 0 Referee: Jonathan Lardot

23 January 2021 22	KV Mechelen	3–0	Eupen	Mechelen
16:15 CET (UTC+1)	Hairemans 26'; Mrabti 47'; De Camargo 74'	Report		Stadium: Achter de Kazerne; Attendance: 0 Referee: Wesli De Cremer

26 January 2021 23	Eupen	0–2	Antwerp	Eupen
18:45 CET (UTC+1)	Koch (yellow card) 56'; Agbadou (yellow card) 66'	Report	Refaelov 18', (penalty missed) 61'; Seck 28'; Gerkens (yellow card) 45+3'	Stadium: Kehrwegstadion; Attendance: 0 Referee: Bram Van Driessche

30 January 2021 24	Eupen	1–1	Excel Mouscron	Eupen
18:30 CET (UTC+1)	Faraj 32' (o.g.)		Silvestre 68'	Stadium: Kehrwegstadion; Attendance: 0

7 February 2021 25	Gent	2–2	Eupen	Ghent
20:45 CET (UTC+1)	Tissoudali 27', 30'; Arslanagić (yellow card) 40'; Hanche-Olsen (yellow card) 63'; Dorsch (yellow card) 90+1'; Yaremchuk (yellow card) 90+5'	Report	Prevljak 7', 64' (pen.); Peeters (yellow card) 90'; Heris (yellow card) 90+2'	Stadium: Ghelamco Arena; Attendance: 0 Referee: Nicolas Laforge

17 February 2021 26	Waasland-Beveren	1–0	Eupen	Beveren
17:00 CET (UTC+1)	Frey 11'; Leuko (yellow card) 29'; Albanese (yellow card) 74'; Heltne Nilsen (yellow card) 85'	Report	Peeters (penalty missed) 30'; Prevljak (yellow card) 57'; N'Dri (yellow card) 90+2'	Stadium: Freethiel Stadion; Attendance: 0 Referee: Erik Lambrechts

20 February 2021 27	Eupen	1–1	Oostende	Eupen
16:15 CET (UTC+1)	Cools (yellow card) 47'; Kayembe (yellow card) 67'; Baby 84'; Peeters (yellow card) 88'	Report	Hjulsager 49'; Tanghe (yellow card) 63'; Bataille (yellow card) 90+1'	Stadium: Kehrwegstadion; Attendance: 0 Referee: Jasper Vergoote

28 February 2021 28	Sint-Truiden	0–2	Eupen	Sint-Truiden
20:45 CET (UTC+1)	Teixeira (red card) 61'; De Ridder (yellow card) 62'; Lavalée (yellow card) 78'	Report	Baby 41'; Miangué (yellow card) 80'; Prevljak 89'	Stadium: Stayen; Attendance: 0 Referee: Alexandre Boucaut

6 March 2021 29	Eupen	3–3	OH Leuven	Eupen
16:15 CET (UTC+1)	Prevljak (penalty missed) 8'; Heris 29', (yellow card) 64'; Amat (yellow card) 32'; Musona 43' (pen.), 67'; Beck (yellow card) 85'; Baby (yellow card) 90'	Report	Malinov 27', (yellow card) 69'; Henry 36'; Mercier 55'; Hubert (yellow card) 90'	Stadium: Kehrwegstadion; Attendance: 0 Referee: Bert Put

20 March 2021 31	Eupen	2–0	Kortrijk	Eupen
18:30 CET (UTC+1)	Ngoy 52'; Musona (yellow card) 78', (goal) 80'; Heris (yellow card) 90+1'	Report	Makarenko (yellow card) 70'; Radovanović (yellow card) 90+4'	Stadium: Kehrwegstadion; Attendance: 0 Referee: Bram van Driessche

5 April 2021 32	Zulte Waregem	2–1	Eupen	Waregem
16:00 CEST (UTC+2)	De Bock (yellow card) 21', (goal) 82'; Pletinckx 59'	Report	Agbadou (yellow card) 18' (yellow-red card) 80'; Peeters 22'; Amat (yellow card) 72'	Stadium: Regenboogstadion; Attendance: 0 Referee: Wim Smet

9 April 2021 33	Eupen	0–4	Standard Liège	Eupen
20:45 CEST (UTC+2)	Peeters (yellow card) 90+2'	Report	Amallah 43', 68'; Muleka 71'; Lestienne 85'	Stadium: Kehrwegstadion; Attendance: 0 Referee: Christof Dierick

17 April 2021 34	Charleroi	2–3	Eupen	Charleroi
18:30 CEST (UTC+2)	Kipré (yellow card) 19'; Gholizadeh 32'; Ilaimaharitra (yellow card) 33', (goal) 81' (pen.); Teodorczyk (yellow card) 46'	Report	Prevljak (penalty missed) 19', 20', 28', 45+1'	Stadium: Stade du Pays de Charleroi; Attendance: 0 Referee: Bram Van Driessche

=== Belgian Cup ===
2 February 2021 Sixth round	Rupel Boom	0–5	Eupen	Boom
18:00 CET (UTC+1)				Stadium: Gemeentelijk Parkstadion
Note: On 19 January 2021, Rupel Boom forfeited the match against Eupen which progressed automatically to the seventh round.

10 February 2021 Seventh round	Eupen	5–1	Olympic Charleroi CF	Eupen
17:00 CET (UTC+1)	Koné 8'; Baby 50'; Magnée 61'; Koch 65'; Sowah Adjei (yellow card) 84'; Bushiri 90+3'	Report	Delbergue 14' (pen.); Castellana (yellow card) 90+2'	Stadium: Kehrwegstadion; Attendance: 0

3 March 2021 Quarter-finals	Eupen	1–0	Gent	Eupen
18:00 CET (UTC+1)	Musona (yellow card) 35'; Prevljak (yellow card) 35'; Heris 49'; Amat (yellow card) 74'	Report		Stadium: Kehrwegstadion; Attendance: 0 Referee: Jan Boterberg

13 March 2021 Semi-finals	Eupen	0–1	Standard Liège	Eupen
20:45 CET (UTC+1)	Peeters (yellow card) 8'; Heris (yellow card) 73'; Defourny (yellow card) 90'	Report	Muleka (yellow card) 16'; Raskin (yellow card) 26'; Amallah 66'; Laifis (yellow card) 90+2'	Stadium: Kehrwegstadion; Attendance: 0 Referee: Lawrence Visser

== Statistics ==
=== Goalscorers ===
As of 11 September 2020

Rank	No.	Pos	Nat	Name	Pro League	Belgian Cup	Total
1	26	MF	(Belgium)	Jens Cools	1	0	1
1	29	MF	(Ghana)	Isaac Nuhu	1	0	1
1	7	FW	(Belgium)	Julien Ngoy	1	0	1
1	9	FW	(Bosnia and Herzegovina)	Smail Prevljak	1	0	1
Totals					4	0	4
