= Elima =

Elima or Elimä may refer to:

- Aphnaeus elima, species of lycaenid or blue butterfly found in Asia
- Kurt Elimä (born 1939), Swedish ski jumper who competed from 1963 to 1966
- Olivier Elima (born 1983), French rugby league footballer who has played in the 2000s and 2010s
- TC Elima, football club from DR Congo
- Elimäki (Swedish: Elimä), former municipality of Finland
