= 2018–19 Linafoot =

Linafoot (Vodacom Ligue 1)
- Season: 2018–19
- Champions: TP Mazembe 17th Title
- Relegated: FC Mont Bleu; AS Dragons/Bilima; OC Muungano
- Champions League: TP Mazembe; AS Vita Club
- Confederation Cup: DC Motema Pembe
- Average attendance: 1,200

The 2018–19 Linafoot was the 58th season of the Linafoot, the top-tier football league in the Democratic Republic of the Congo, since its establishment in 1958. The season started on 23 September 2018.

== League table ==
Pos	Team	Pld	W	D	L	GF	GA	GD	Pts	Qualification or relegation
1	TP Mazembe (C, Q)	30	27	2	1	82	11	+71	83	Qualification for Champions League
2	AS Vita Club (Q)	30	23	5	2	60	15	+45	74	Qualification for Champions League
3	DC Motema Pembe (Q)	30	19	6	5	47	25	+22	63	Qualification for Confederation Cup (Note: AS Maniema Union are Coupe du Congo DR winners.)
4	AS Maniema Union (Q)	30	17	6	7	40	23	+17	57	Qualification for Confederation Cup
5	SM Sanga Balende	30	11	9	10	36	29	+7	42	
6	FC Saint-Éloi Lupopo	30	10	11	9	25	25	0	41	
7	AS Dauphins Noirs	30	11	7	12	29	41	−12	40	
8	AS Nyuki	30	10	8	12	28	32	−4	38	
9	FC Renaissance du Congo	30	10	8	12	28	40	−12	38	
10	AC Rangers	30	10	7	13	30	30	0	37	
11	CS Don Bosco	30	9	9	12	34	36	−2	36	
12	JS Groupe Bazano	30	9	7	14	25	30	−5	34	
13	FC Lubumbashi Sport	30	8	8	14	35	42	−7	32	
14	FC Mont Bleu (R)	30	7	9	14	25	43	−18	30	Relegation
15	AS Dragons (R)	30	3	5	22	12	53	−41	14	Relegation
16	OC Muungano (D, R)	30	2	1	27	10	71	−61	7	Excluded for forfeiting three matches

Source: Linafoot
(C) Champions; (D) Disqualified; (Q) Qualified for the phase indicated; (R) Relegated

== Attendances ==
#	Football club	Average attendance
1	TP Mazembe	5,784
2	FC Saint-Éloi Lupopo	4,369
3	AS Vita Club	2,666
4	FC Renaissance	1,788
5	DC Motema Pembe	1,201
6	AS Dauphins Noirs	868
7	SM Sanga Balende	804
8	AS Dragons	722
9	OC Muungano	632
10	FC Mont Bleu	588
11	CS Don Bosco	453
12	AS Nyuki	444
13	AS Maniema Union	418
14	Lubumbashi Sport	252
15	JS Groupe Bazano	168
16	AC Rangers	124
