= Football in the Democratic Republic of the Congo =

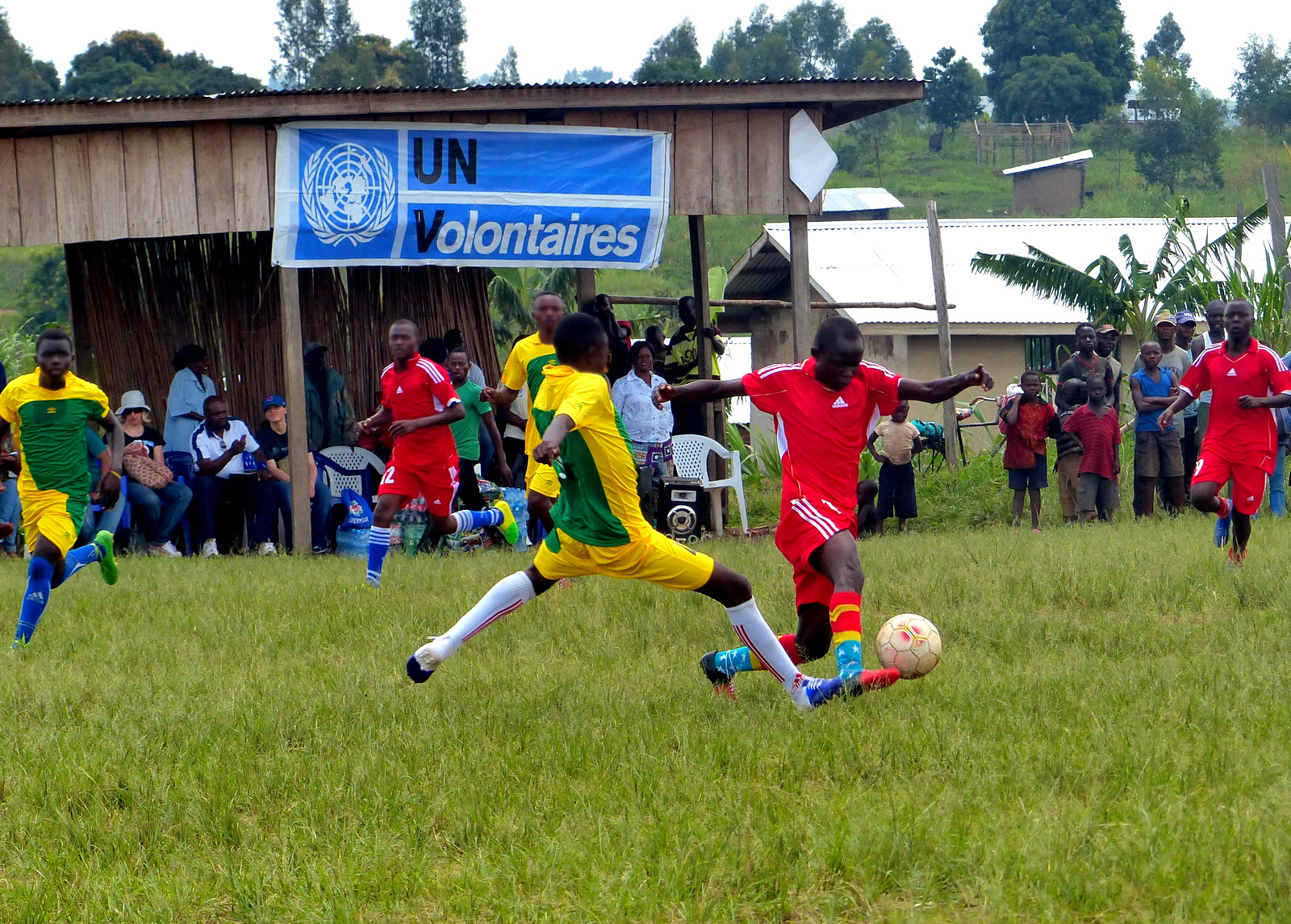
- A youth football match in the Democratic Republic of the Congo in 2015
- Governing body: Congolese Association Football Federation
- National team: men's national team

National competitions
- Coupe du Congo

Club competitions
- Linafoot

International competitions
- Champions League; CAF Confederation Cup; Super Cup; FIFA Club World Cup; FIFA World Cup (National Team); African Cup of Nations (National Team)

Football is the most popular sport played in the Democratic Republic of the Congo. The country has around 35 million football fans, which is around 35% of the population. The national football team has won the African Cup of Nations twice: in 1968 and 1974 under the nations' former name Zaire. The national team qualified for the World Cup in 1974 as Zaire, and in 2026, their only appearances in that tournament.

== Domestic football ==
At club level, in the 2010 FIFA Club World Cup, TP Mazembe made history as the first ever African club to reach a FIFA tournament final, beating the 2010 Copa Libertadores champions SC Internacional in the semifinals and losing to European Champions Internazionale in the final.

== International football ==
Although DR Congo has had limited international success since the late 1970s, numerous players of Congolese descent have played professionally in Europe, including Romelu Lukaku, Aaron Wan-Bissaka, Jonathan Ikoné, Michy Batshuayi, Youri Tielemans, Steve Mandanda, Tanguy Ndombele, Christian Benteke, Elio Capradossi, Sara Gama, Axel Tuanzebe, Isaac Kiese Thelin, José Bosingwa and Denis Zakaria.

In international competitions, DR Congo has only qualified for three FIFA tournaments, the 1974 and FIFA World Cup and 2026 FIFA World Cup for the senior men's side, and the 2006 and 2008 FIFA U-20 Women's World Cups, achieved by the U-20 women's side.

== The largest football stadiums ==
#	Stadium	Location	Capacity	Home team(s)	Image
1	Stade des Martyrs	Kinshasa	80,000	National team	
2	Stade Tata Raphaël	Kinshasa	45,000	DC Motema Pembe, AS Vita Club	

== Attendances ==
The average attendance per top-flight football league season and the club with the highest average attendance:

Season	League average	Best club	Best club average
2018-19	1,330	TP Mazembe	5,784

Source: League page on Wikipedia

== See also ==
- DR Congo national football team
- DR Congo women's national football team
- Congolese Association Football Federation
- List of football stadiums in the Democratic Republic of the Congo
