= 2018 Coupe du Congo (DR Congo) =

Tournament details
- Country: Democratic Republic of the Congo

Final positions
- Champions: AS Nyuki
- Runners-up: JS Kinshasa

The 2018 Coupe du Congo is the 54th edition of the Coupe du Congo, the knockout football competition of the Democratic Republic of the Congo.

== Provincial preliminaries ==
The following teams qualified for the final stage from the provincial preliminaries:

- Bukavu, Group A: AS Nyuki (Butembo)
- Bukavu, Group B: OC Bukavu Dawa (Bukavu)
- Kasaï-Katanga Playoff: AS Bantous (Mbuji-Mayi)
- Kinshasa, Group A: Jeunesse Sportive (Kinshasa), FC Kungu Pemba (Kikwit)
- Kinshasa, Group B: FC Renaissance du Congo (Kinshasa), TP Molunge (Mbandaka)
- Kongo Central: FC Océan Pacifique (Mbuji-Mayi)

== Final stage ==
=== Group A ===
In Mbuji-Mayi

Round 1 [Jun 28]

Kungu Pemba 0-4 JSK

Nyuki 1-1 AS Bantous

Round 2 [Jun 30]

AS Bantous 1-3 JSK

Nyuki 3-2 Kungu Pemba

Round 3 [Jul 2]

JSK 1-1 Nyuki

AS Bantous 1-2 Kungu Pemba

Final Table:

1.Jeunesse Sportive (Kinshasa)        3   2  1  0   8- 2   7
2.AS Nyuki (Butembo)                  3   1  2  0   5- 4   5
- - - - - - - - - - - - - - - - - - - - - - - - - - - - - - -
3.FC Kungu Pemba (Kikwit)             3   1  0  2   4- 8   3
4.AS Bantous (Mbuji-Mayi)             3   0  1  2   3- 6   1

=== Group B ===
In Kinshasa

Round 1

[Jun 25]

Renaissance 1-1 Bukavu Dawa

[Jun 27]

Océan Pacifique 2-3 TP Molunge

Round 2 [Jun 29]

Bukavu Dawa 1-2 TP Molunge

Renaissance 3-0 Océan Pacifique

Round 3 [Jul 2]

Bukavu Dawa 1-0 Océan Pacifique

TP Molunge 0-4 Renaissance

Final Table:

1.FC Renaissance du Congo (Kinshasa)  3   2  1  0   8- 1   7
2.TP Molunge (Mbandaka)               3   2  0  1   5- 7   6
- - - - - - - - - - - - - - - - - - - - - - - - - - - - - - -
3.OC Bukavu Dawa (Bukavu)             3   1  1  1   3- 3   4
4.FC Océan Pacifique (Mbuji-Mayi)     3   0  0  3   2- 7   0

=== Semi-finals ===
[Jul 13, stade Manika, Kolwezi]

JS Kinshasa 3-0 TP Molunge [also reported 3-1]

FC Renaissance 1-1 AS Nyuki [2-4 pen]

=== Third place match ===
[Jul 15, stade Manika, Kolwezi]

TP Molunge 2-1 FC Renaissance

=== Final ===
[Jul 15, stade Manika, Kolwezi]

JS Kinshasa 1-2 AS Nyuki

== See also ==
- 2017–18 Linafoot
