= Stade Kashala Bonzola =

Coordinates: 11°40′42″S 27°29′21″E

- Interactive map of Stade Kashala Bonzola
- Full name: Stade Kashala Bonzola
- Location: 123 Av. Inga, C/Kanshi Kasai Oriental, Mbuji-Mayi, Democratic Republic of the Congo
- Operator: Ministry of Kasai Oriental
- Capacity: 15,000
- Surface: artificial grass
- Field size: 90m/120

Construction
- Groundbreaking: January 2014
- Built: 2016
- Opened: April 2018
- Cost: $10 million

Tenant
- SM Sanga Balende

Stade Kashala Bonzola is a multi-use stadium in the Kanshi suburb of Mbuji-Mayi, Democratic Republic of the Congo. The stadium was completed in 2016 and is mostly used for football matches. It serves as the new home venue of SM Sanga Balende. The stadium has 15,000 seats.

== Construction ==
The new stadium is located in Mbuji-Mayi, the capital of Kasaï-Oriental province and meets the "standards" of CAF for its measurement, lighting, safety and the seats reserved for media.

The future home of Sa Majesté Sanga Balende includes an omni-sport stadium for other sports including karate, judo, boxing, volleyball and basketball.
