= AC Capaco Beni =

- Full name: Athletique Club Capaco Beni
- Founded: 1974
- Ground: Stade des Volcans; Goma, DR Congo
- Capacity: 10,000
- League: Linafoot Ligue 2

Athletique Club Capaco Beni, is a Congolese football club based in Beni, North Kivu province and currently playing in the Linafoot Ligue 2, the second level of the Congolese football.

The club was founded in 1974.

== Honours ==
Nord-Kivu Provincial League (LIFNOKI)

- Winners (1): 2003, 2017–18
