= Stade des Volcans =

Stadium in Goma, Democratic Republic of the Congo

- Interactive map of Stade des Volcans
- Full name: Stade des Volcans
- Location: Goma, Congo DR
- Coordinates: 1°40′56.0″S 29°14′17.1″E
- Capacity: 5,000

Tenants
- AS Kabasha; AS Dauphins Noirs

Stade des Volcans is a multi-use stadium in Goma, Democratic Republic of the Congo. It is currently used mostly for football matches and serves as the home venue for AS Kabasha and AS Dauphins Noirs. The stadium has a capacity of 5,000 people.
