= TP Mazembe Stadium =

Stadium in Lubumbashi, Democratic Republic of the Congo

Coordinates: 11°40′42″S 27°29′21″E

- Interactive map of TP Mazembe Stadium
- Former names: Stade Mwanke
- Location: Avenue des Sports, Lubumbashi, Democratic Republic of the Congo
- Owner: TP Mazembe
- Capacity: 18,500
- Surface: artificial grass

Construction
- Built: 2010
- Opened: 12 July 2012; 14 years ago
- Renovated: 2019

Tenants
- TP Mazembe (2012–present); CS Don Bosco (2012–present)

TP Mazembe Stadium is a multi-use stadium located in the Kamalondo suburb of Lubumbashi, Democratic Republic of the Congo. Since its completion in 2012, it has mostly been used for football matches and is the home venue of TP Mazembe and CS Don Bosco. The stadium has 18,000 seats.

== History ==
In April 2010 the construction of the new stadium of the TP Mazembe Lubumbashi club began, an enclosure that will meet the standards required by the African Football Confederation (CAF) to host international competitions, the new facilities have a VIP press room, parking for vehicles and synthetic grass.

Until 2011 the TP Mazembe made use of the Stade Frederic Kibassa Maliba.

== Matches at African Competitions ==
Date	Team No. 1	Res.	Team No. 2	Round	Competition
20 March 2016	(Democratic Republic of the Congo) Mazembe	1 – 0	(Ethiopia) Saint George	(first round)	2016 CAF Champions League
20 April 2016	(Democratic Republic of the Congo) Mazembe	1 – 1	(Morocco) Wydad AC	(second round)	2016 CAF Champions League
8 May 2016	(Democratic Republic of the Congo) Mazembe	1 – 0	(Tunisia) Stade Gabèsien	(play-off round)	2016 CAF Confederation Cup
19 June 2016	(Democratic Republic of the Congo) Mazembe	3 – 1	(Ghana) Medeama	Group Stage (group A)	2016 CAF Confederation Cup

== See also ==
- List of football stadiums in the Democratic Republic of the Congo
- Lists of stadiums
