= Linafoot Ligue 2 =

- Founded: 2012
- Country: DR Congo
- Confederation: CAF
- Number of clubs: 48
- Level on pyramid: 2
- Promotion to: Linafoot Ligue 1
- Relegation to: Provincial Leagues
- Domestic cup: Coupe du Congo
- Current champions: AS Kiya Sport (Zone-East); US Panda B52 (Zone-West); Etoile de Kivu (Zone-South Central)
- Most championships: RC Kinshasa (2 titles)
- Current: 2024-25

Linafoot Ligue 2, also known as Ligue 2 or for sponsorship reasons Illicocash Ligue 2, is the second-tier football competition in the Democratic Republic of the Congo. Created in 2012, it is organized by Linafoot (Ligue Nationale de Football) under the authority of the Congolese Association Football Federation.

== History ==
Before the creation of Ligue 2, Congolese football was organized through a network of provincial championships. Each province ran its own league, and at the end of the season the best clubs from the provincial competitions advanced to the national qualification phase.

In 2012, following the formation of Linafoot Ligue 1, the national federation introduced a promotion system called the Tournoi de la Montée, which brought together the champions of all provincial leagues. The competition was organized into three geographical zones: West, East, and Center–South.

The format remained in place until 2017, when the federation decided to restructure the pyramid and create a true nationwide second division. As a result, in 2018, the provincial champions were incorporated into the newly established Ligue 2, replacing the old promotion tournament. To address the challenges of long distances and reduce travel costs for the teams, the idea of a single national pool was abandoned in favor of a traditional format consisting of three groups divided by zones, West, East, and Center–South, each comprising 10 teams.

== Previous winners ==
Season	Zone East	Zone West	Zone South Central
2012	AS Dauphins Noirs	SC Rojolu	CS Don Bosco
2013	AS Nika	Sharks XI FC	Lubumbashi Sport
2014	AC Capaco Beni	RC Kinshasa	AS Bantous
2015	US Socozaki	AS Dragons Bilima	AS New Soger
2016	DC Virunga	AS Veti	AC Dibumba
2017	FC Mont Bleu	Académic Club Rangers	Ecofoot Katumbi
2018–19	OC Bukavu Dawa	RC Kinshasa	FC Simba Kolwezi
2019–20	TS Malekesa	JS Kinshasa	Blessing Kolwezi
2020–21	Etoile de Kivu	AS Kuya Sport	US Panda B5 Likasi
