= AS Nika =

- Full name: Association Sportive Nika
- Founded: 1955 as FC RUBI
- Ground: Stade Lumumba; Kisangani, DR Congo
- Capacity: 10,000
- League: Linafoot Ligue 2
- 2013–14: 6th, Group A
- Website: https://web.archive.org/web/20150402140515/http://www.asnika.com/

Association Sportive Nika, more commonly known as AS Nika, is a Congolese football club based in Kisangani, Tshopo province and currently playing in the Linafoot Ligue 2, the second level of the Congolese football. Their home games are played at Stade Lumumba.

== History ==
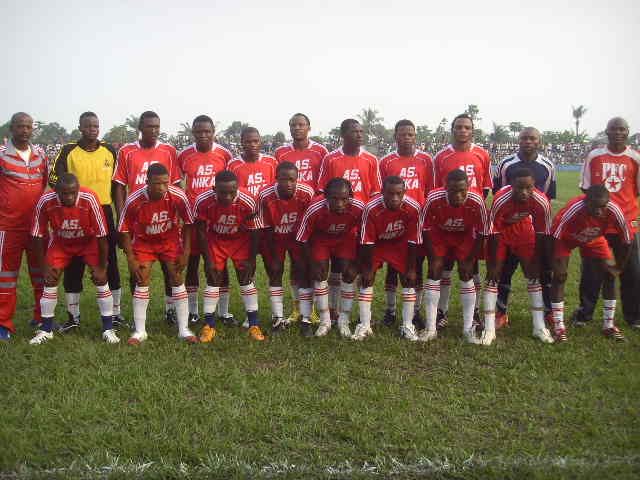
AS Nika team line-up 2010

AS Nika was founded in 1955 as FC RUBI, the name of the river which symbolizes their origin and which is found at the entrance to the city of Buta, by the students of Frères Maristes school from Buta who came to study in Kisangani.

Over time, the club has had several names; FC Dieterein, INSS, Espoir, Electronic and from 1972 AS Nika.

== Honours ==
Ligue de Football de Province Orientale (LIFPO)

- Winners (1): 2006
- Runners-up (1): 2010
- Winners (3) 1981. 1982. 1983

The president was Mr Litoke Batundulundu Likundu Augustin Simon.
