= TC Elima =

- Full name: Tout Capable Elima
- Ground: Stade Socol; Matadi, DR Congo
- Capacity: 10,000
- League: Linafoot
- 2012: 6th

Tout Capable Elima (in English: Almighty Elima) is a football club from Matadi, DR Congo. TC Elima plays in the Linafoot.

The team returned to the second-tier Linafoot Ligue 2 in 2024.

== Honours ==
Ligue de Football Bas-Congo (LIFBACO)

- Winners (4): 1995, 2009, 2010, 2012
