= CS Makiso =

Congolese football club

- Full name: Cercle Sportif Makiso
- Nickname: Les Corbeaux Boyomais
- Ground: Stade Lumumba; Kisangani, DR Congo
- Capacity: 10,000
- League: Linafoot Ligue 2
- 2012: 11th
Home colours	Away colours

Cercle Sportif Makiso is a Congolese football club based in Kisangani, Tshopo province and currently playing in the Linafoot Ligue 2, the second level of the Congolese football.

The club plays the Kisangani derby against local rivals TS Malekesa.
