= Frederic Kibassa Maliba Stadium =

Stadium in Lubumbashi, DR Congo

Coordinates: 11°42′17″S 27°29′02″E

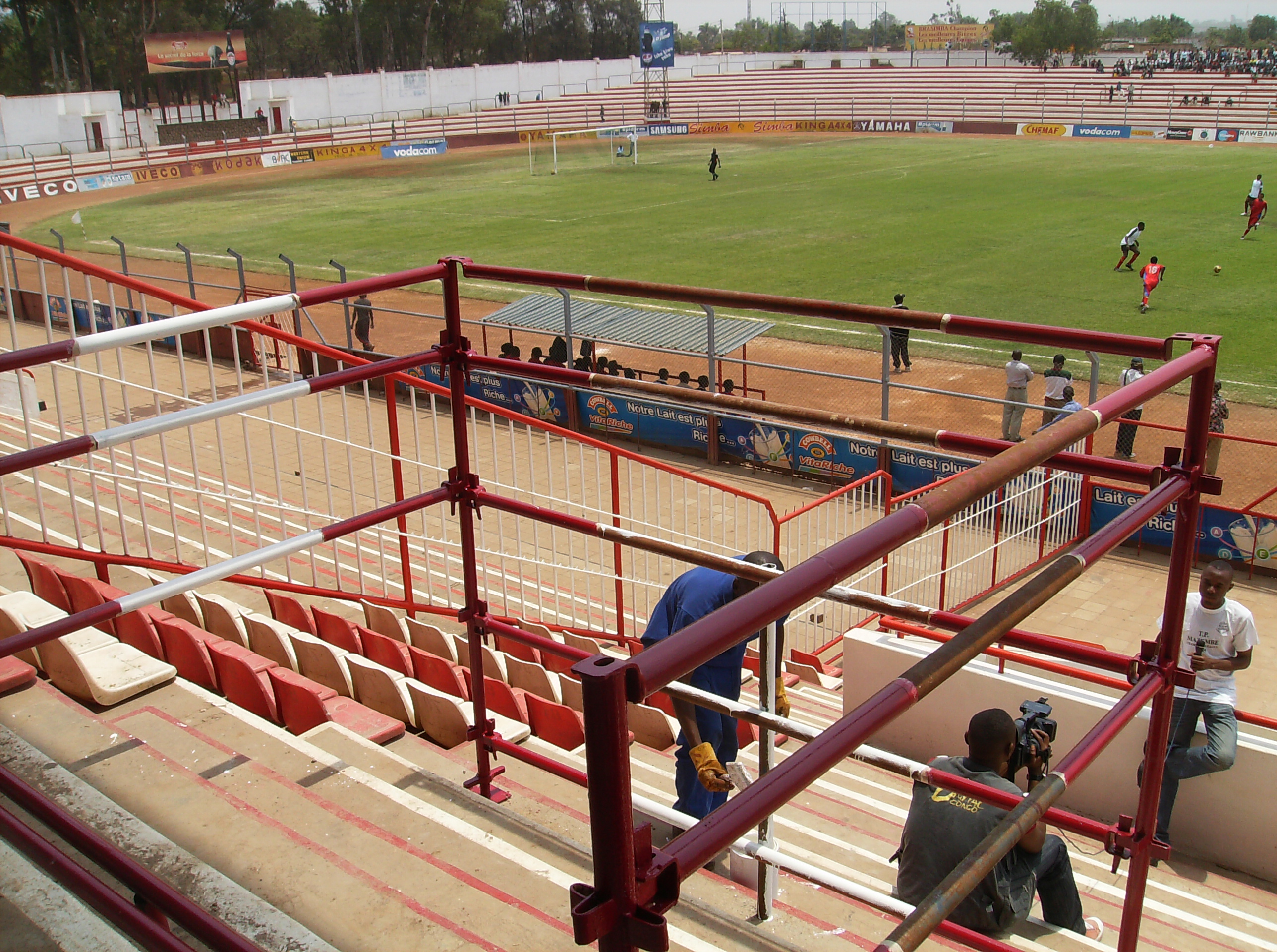
Stade omnisport Kibassa-Maliba

Frederic Kibassa Maliba Stadium, also known as Kenya Stadium, is a multi-use stadium located in the Kenya suburb of Lubumbashi, Democratic Republic of the Congo. It is currently used mostly for football matches. It is the current home of FC Saint Eloi Lupopo and the former home venue of TP Mazembe. The stadium has a capacity of 20,000 people and is named after Frederic Kibassa Maliba, a former Minister of Youth and Sports.

== See also ==
- List of football stadiums in the Democratic Republic of the Congo
- Lists of stadiums
