= JS Groupe Bazano =

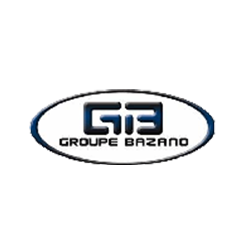
- Full name: Jeunesse Sportive Groupe Bazano
- Nicknames: Les Miniers (The Miners)
- Founded: 2013; 13 years ago
- Ground: Stade Frederic Kibassa Maliba
- Capacity: 20,000
- League: Linafoot

Jeunesse Sportive Groupe Bazano is a professional Congolese football club based in Lubumbashi, Haut-Katanga province. Founded in 2013, they currently play in the DR Congo top domestic league Linafoot. 20,000-capacity Stade Frederic Kibassa Maliba is their home venue.
