= OC Muungano =

Muungano
- Full name: OC Muungano
- Founded: 1948
- Ground: Stade de la Concorde; Bukavu, DR Congo
- Capacity: 10,000
- League: Linafoot Ligue 2
- 2018–19: Linafoot, 16th, Relegated

Olympic Club Muungano is a Congolese football club based in Bukavu, South Kivu province and currently playing in Linafoot Ligue 2.

Les Blanc et Bleu plays its home matches on Stade de la Concorde in Bukavu, with a capacity of 10,000 places.

== Achievements ==
- Sud-Kivu Provincial League: 2

2003, 2006
