= SC Rojolu =

- Full name: SC Rojolu
- Ground: Stade des Martyrs; Kinshasa, DR Congo
- Capacity: 80,000
- League: EUFKIN Lukunga

SC Rojolu is a Congolese football club based in Kinshasa. They play their home games at the 80,000 capacity Stade des Martyrs.

== History ==
The club was established at the initiative of Roger Lukaku, professional footballer like his sons, expatriates in Belgium. They are from Kintambo where the club is located. The name of the club comes from the initials of ROmelu, JOrdan and LUkaku.

Rojolu obtained its visa for the Linafoot 2013 season after defeated FC Lumière de Mbandaka in the final of the qualifying tournament in Division I on the score of (2–0) at the Stade des Martyrs in Kinshasa, thanks to Lumanisa Mpimpa double.
