= Sharks XI FC =

- Full name: Sharks XI Football Club
- Founded: 2008
- Ground: Stade des Martyrs
- Capacity: 80,000
- League: Linafoot
- 2013–14: 5th, Group B
Home colours

Sharks XI Football Club is a Congolese football club based in Kinshasa, the capital of the Democratic Republic of the Congo.

== History ==
In 2017, after playing four years in Linafoot, Shark XI FC withdrew from championship denouncing the "mismanagement" of the league.

== Stadium ==
Currently the team plays at the Stade des Martyrs.
