= Racing Club Kinshasa =

RC Kinshasa
- Full name: Racing Club Kinshasa
- Founded: 2002
- Ground: Stade des Martyrs, Kinshasa
- Capacity: 80,000
- President: Tostao Mbemba
- League: Ligue 2 - Zone West
- 2022–23: TBA

Racing Club de Kinshasa is a Congolese football club based in Kinshasa. They play their home games at the 80,000 capacity Stade des Martyrs in Kinshasa.

== History ==
RC Kinshasa was established in 2002 and is currently playing in Linafoot after won the 2018–19 Ligue 2 season and promoting to the top division of congolese football.

== Honours ==
Linafoot Ligue 2

- Winners (1): 2018–19

Entente Provinciale de Football de Kinshasa

- Winners (1): 2013–14
