= Lubumbashi Sport =

FC Lubumbashi Sport
- Full name: Football Club Lubumbashi Sport
- Nickname: Kamikazes
- Founded: 1929
- Ground: Stade Frederic Kibassa Maliba, Lubumbashi, DR Congo
- Capacity: 20,000
- Chairman: Marc Mukendi
- Manager: Benoît Tshiyoyo
- League: Linafoot
- 2025–26: 7th
- Website: lubumbashisport.com

Football Club Lubumbashi Sport are a football club from the DR Congo. They currently play in the DR Congo top domestic league Linafoot. Their home games are held in the Stade Frederic Kibassa Maliba in Lubumbashi.

== Honours and achievements ==
- Coupe du Congo (National league)
  - Runner-up (1): 1980
- LIFKAT (Katanga Province)
  - Champions (6): 1966, 2006, 2007, 2009, 2010, 2011
- EUFLU (Lubumbashi)
  - Champion (4): 1964, 1974, 1984, 1994
- Linafoot Ligue 2
  - Champion (1): 2013 (Zone South Central)

== Performance in CAF competitions ==
- African Cup Winners' Cup: 1 appearances

1981 – First Round
