= SM Sanga Balende =

Sa Majesté Sanga Balende
- Full name: Sa Majesté Sanga Balende.
- Nicknames: Wa Banjelu ni Bansantu (of the angels and the saints)
- Founded: 1962; 64 years ago
- Ground: Stade Kashala Bonzola, Mbuji-Mayi
- Capacity: 15,000
- President: Alexis Fakih
- Manager: Daoulla Lupembe
- League: Linafoot
- 2025–26: Linafoot, 9th of 16
- Website: sangabalende.com
Home colours

Sa Majesté Sanga Balende, is a football club that plays in the Democratic Republic of Congo top tier: Vodacom Ligue 1. Sanga Balende is the only club in vodacom Ligue 1, that is from Kasai Oriental, This gives them a lot of popularity around the DRC amongst the people of Kasai Districts. They have one of the biggest fan base around the country. The club is based in the city of Mbuji-Mayi.

== History ==
The club was founded on 25 March 1962 under the name of Union Sud-Kasaienne, the name was changed to Nsanga Balende with Zairian authenticity. "Sa Majesté" means His Majesty. Among the co-founders are: Jonas Mukamba Kadiata Nzemba, Muela Kankonde and Nestor Lubula.

== Honours ==
Linafoot

- Winners (1): 1983
- Runners-up (1): 2013–14

Coupe du Congo

- Runners-up (1): 2002 & 2021

== Performance in CAF competitions ==
- CAF Champions League: 1 appearance

2015 – Second Round

- CAF Confederation Cup: 2 appearances

2015 – Second Round of 16
2017 – First round
