= AS Dauphins Noirs =

Dauphin Noir
- Full name: AS Dauphin Noir Goma
- Founded: 2002
- Ground: Stade de l'Unité; Goma, DR Congo
- Capacity: 10,000
- League: Linafoot
- 2025–26: Linafoot, 5th in Group B
Home colours	Away colours

AS Dauphins Noirs (Black Dolphins) is a football club from DR Congo. They play their home games at Stade des Volcans, which has a capacity of 10,000. The stadium is located in Goma.
