= CS Don Bosco =

Football club in the Democratic Republic of the Congo

- Full name: Cercle Sportif Don Bosco de Lubumbashi
- Nickname: Salesians
- Founded: 1948
- Ground: Stade TP Mazembe, Lubumbashi
- Capacity: 18,000
- Chairman: Champion Katumbi
- Manager: Lamine Ndiaye
- League: Linafoot
- 2025–26: 6th
Home colours	Away colours

Cercle Sportif Don Bosco de Lubumbashi or simply CS Don Bosco is a football club from DR Congo based in Lubumbashi. They play their home games at the 18,000 capacity Stade TP Mazembe. The club serves as a feeder club to TP Mazembe and is owned by Moïse Katumbi Chapwe's son.

== Honours ==
Coupe du Congo

- Winners (1): 2012
- Runner-up (1): 2016

Linafoot Ligue 2

- Winners (1): 2012 (Zone South Central)

LIFKAT (Katanga Province)

- Champions (1): 2012

== Performance in CAF competitions ==
- CAF Confederation Cup: 1 appearance

2014 - First round
