= 2012 Linafoot =

Linafoot
- Season: 2012
- Champions: TP Mazembe
- Champions League: TP Mazembe; Vita Club
- Confederation Cup: DC Motema Pembe; Don Bosco (cup winner)

The 2012 Linafoot season, the top division of the Congolese Association Football Federation, was the 51st edition since its establishment. It began on 12 February 2012 and ended on 20 November 2012. During the mid-season break it was decided the second half of the season would consist of 10 rounds of matches only; 3 entire rounds were cancelled.

== Clubs ==
A total of 14 teams are contesting the league, played under a round-robbin format.

Locations of teams in the 2012 Linafoot

Team	Location	Stadium	Capacity
AC Nkoy Bilombe	Kindu	Stade Municipal	1,000
AS Saint-Luc	Kananga	Stade des Jeunes	10,000
AS Vita Club	Kinshasa	Stade des Martyrs	80,000
AS Vutuka	Kikwit	Stade Colonel Ebeya	1,000
CS Makiso	Kisangani	Stade Lumumba	10,000
DC Motema Pembe	Kinshasa	Stade des Martyrs	80,000
DC Virunga	Goma	Stade de Virunga	10,000
FC Saint Eloi Lupopo	Lubumbashi	Stade Frederic Kibassa Maliba	35,000
OC Muungano	Bukavu	Stade de la Concorde	10,000
SM Sanga Balende	Mbuji-Mayi	Stade Tshikisha	8,000
TC Elima	Matadi	Stade Socol	5,000
TP Mazembe	Lubumbashi	Stade Frederic Kibassa Maliba	35,000
TP Molunge	Mbandaka	Stade Bakusu	1,500
US Tshinkunku	Kananga	Stade des Jeunes	10,000

== League table ==
Pos	Team	Pld	W	D	L	GF	GA	GD	Pts	Qualification or relegation
1	TP Mazembe	23	21	1	1	65	6	+59	64	2014 CAF Champions League
2	AS Vita Club	23	20	2	1	56	12	+44	62	2014 CAF Champions League
3	DC Motema Pembe	23	18	1	4	42	6	+36	55	2014 CAF Confederation Cup
4	SM Sanga Balende	23	11	6	6	33	17	+16	39	
5	TP Molunge	23	10	4	9	23	25	−2	34	
6	TC Elima	23	10	3	10	25	28	−3	33	
7	OC Muungano	23	9	5	9	26	26	0	32	
8	FC Saint Eloi Lupopo	23	8	7	8	20	15	+5	31	
9	DC Virunga	23	7	4	12	22	35	−13	25	
10	US Tshinkunku	23	4	8	11	14	39	−25	20	
11	CS Makiso	23	5	3	15	16	36	−20	18	
12	AS Vutuka	23	4	4	15	9	42	−33	16	
13	AS Saint-Luc	23	2	8	13	17	40	−23	14	
14	AC Nkoy	23	4	0	19	10	51	−41	12	

Updated to match(es) played on 20 November 2012. Source:
Rules for classification: 1) points; 2) goal difference; 3) number of goals scored.
- CS Don Bosco also qualified for the 2013 CAF Confederation Cup as the 2012 Coupe du Congo winner.
