= 2020–21 Linafoot =

Linafoot (Vodacom Ligue 1)
- Season: 2020–21
- Champions: Vita Club

The 2020–21 Linafoot was the 60th season of the Linafoot, the top-tier football league in the Democratic Republic of the Congo, since its establishment in 1958. The season started on 2 October 2020 and ended on 9 June 2021 Defending champions TP Mazembe won their 3rd consecutive and 19th overall Linafoot title.

== Teams changes ==
16 teams compete in this season: the top 14 teams from the previous season and two promoted teams from the 2019–20 Linafoot Ligue 2.

Relegated from Ligue 1

- OC Bukavu Dawa
- AS Nyuki

Promoted from Ligue 2

- Blessing FC
- JS Kinshasa

== League table ==
Pos	Team	Pld	W	D	L	GF	GA	GD	Pts	Qualification or relegation
1	AS Vita Club (C)	30	22	8	0	47	12	+35	74	Qualification for the Champions League
2	TP Mazembe	30	20	9	1	55	14	+41	69	Qualification for the Champions League
3	AS Maniema Union	30	20	6	4	43	17	+26	66	Qualification for the Confederation Cup
4	FC Saint-Éloi Lupopo	30	14	10	6	31	19	+12	52	
5	SM Sanga Balende	30	15	5	10	30	24	+6	50	
6	DC Motema Pembe	30	13	7	10	31	24	+7	46	Qualification for Confederation Cup (Note: DC Motema Pembe qualified for the Confederation Cup as the Coupe du Congo winners.)
7	Blessing FC	30	10	9	11	25	27	−2	39	
8	AC Rangers	30	10	4	16	25	44	−19	34	
9	CS Don Bosco	30	9	6	15	28	32	−4	33	
10	JS Kinshasa	30	7	11	12	25	29	−4	32	
11	FC Renaissance du Congo	30	7	10	13	27	42	−15	31	
12	FC Simba Kolwezi	30	8	7	15	29	45	−16	31	
13	JS Groupe Bazano	30	6	11	13	22	28	−6	29	
14	AS Dauphins Noirs (R)	30	8	5	17	26	37	−11	29	Relegation to Linafoot Ligue 2
15	RC Kinshasa (R)	30	5	9	16	25	45	−20	24	Relegation to Linafoot Ligue 2
16	FC Lubumbashi Sport (R)	30	5	5	20	18	48	−30	20	Relegation to Linafoot Ligue 2

Source: soccerway.com
(C) Champions; (R) Relegated
