= 2011 Linafoot =

Linafoot
- Season: 2011
- 2012 CAF Champions League: TP Mazembe; AS Vita Club
- 2012 CAF Confederation Cup: FC Saint Eloi Lupopo; US Tshinkunku (cup winner)

The 2011 Linafoot season was the 50th season of Top League Linafoot in DR Congo. Defending champions are AS Vita from Kinshasa. Seventeen teams entered the competition. TP Mazembe won the championship.

== Changes from 2010 ==
A new format was introduced. In contrast to the previous season, the final round is made up of eight teams in one group. In 2010 eight teams were divided into two groups of four with the top two finishers advancing to yet another group stage. The winner of the group of 8 will be the champion.

== Preliminary round ==
In the preliminary round 12 teams in three groups played a double round robin. The group winners advanced to the next round.

Group A
Pos	Team	Pld	W	D	L	GF	GA	GD	Pts	Qualification
1	RC Kinshasa	6	5	0	1	12	2	+10	15	Group Stage
2	AS Veti Matadi	6	4	1	1	7	2	+5	13	
3	FC Lupopo de Kikwit	6	2	1	3	7	7	0	7	
4	TP Molunge	6	0	0	6	0	15	−15	0	

Source: rsssf.com

Group B
Pos	Team	Pld	W	D	L	GF	GA	GD	Pts	Qualification
1	CS Don Bosco	6	4	2	0	10	1	+9	14	Group Stage
2	AS Bantous	6	2	3	1	9	4	+5	9	
3	Shark XI FC	6	2	3	1	8	4	+4	9	
4	US Tshinkunku	6	0	0	6	0	18	−18	0	

Source: rsssf.com

Group C
Pos	Team	Pld	W	D	L	GF	GA	GD	Pts	Qualification
1	TS Malekesa	6	4	1	1	10	3	+7	13	Group Stage
2	FC Nyuki	6	3	2	1	9	3	+6	11	
3	OC Bukavu Dawa	6	3	1	2	9	4	+5	10	
4	AC Nkoy	6	0	0	6	0	18	−18	0	

Source: rsssf.com

== SuperLeague (final round) ==
In the final round the three teams from the preliminary round join the top four placed teams from last season and 2010 Cup winner DC Motema Pembe. The eight teams play a double round robin, that is each team plays 14 matches.

Pos	Team	Pld	W	D	L	GF	GA	GD	Pts	Qualification
1	TP Mazembe (C)	14	8	6	0	33	6	+27	30	2012 CAF Champions League
2	AS Vita Club	14	8	5	1	22	7	+15	29	2012 CAF Champions League
3	FC Saint Eloi Lupopo	14	6	4	4	15	11	+4	19 (Note: FC Saint Eloi Lupopo were deducted 3 points. They were ranked third based on the fewest losses.)	2012 CAF Confederation Cup
4	DC Motema Pembe	14	5	4	5	14	7	+7	19	
5	RC Kinshasa	14	6	1	7	14	24	−10	19	
6	CS Don Bosco	14	5	2	7	13	20	−7	17	
7	TC Elima	14	3	5	6	14	23	−9	14	
8	TS Malekesa	14	1	1	12	10	37	−27	4	

Updated to match(es) played on 23 October 2011. Source: FIFA
Rules for classification: 1) points; 2) goal difference; 3) number of goals scored.
(C) Champions
Notes:
- US Tshinkunku also qualified for the 2012 CAF Confederation Cup as the 2011 Coupe du Congo winner.
