= Ley Matampi =

Congolese footballer

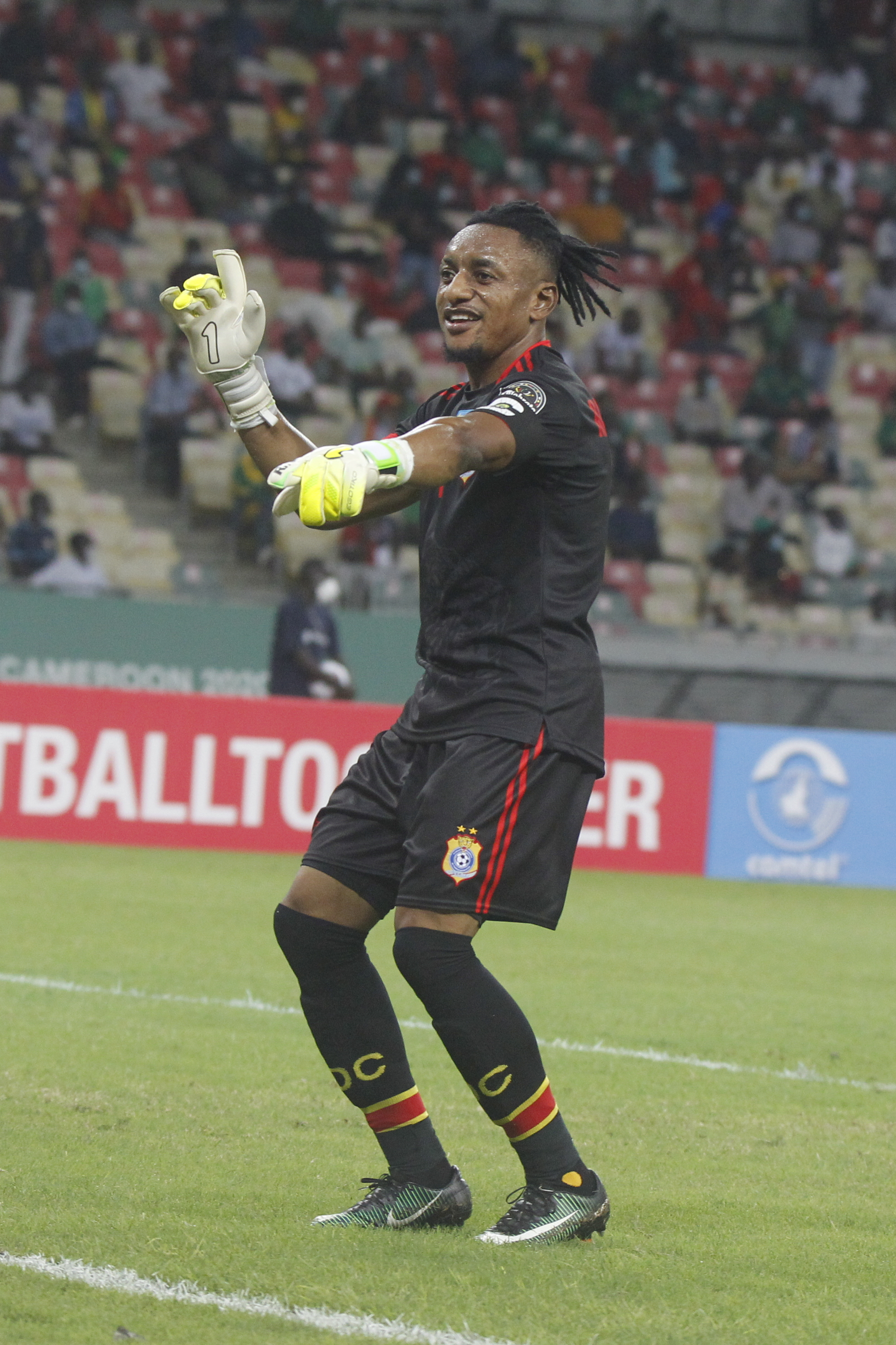
- Ley Matampi playing for DR Congo in 2021.

Personal information
- Full name: Vumi Ley Matampi
- Date of birth: 18 April 1989 (age 37)
- Place of birth: Kinshasa, Zaire
- Height: 1.82 m (6 ft 0 in)
- Position: Goalkeeper

Team information
- Current team: Coastal Union

Senior career*
Years	Team	Apps	(Gls)
2004–2005	AS Vita		
2005–2012	Motema Pembe	200	(0)
2012–2014	TP Mazembe		
2014–2015	Kabuscorp	7	(0)
2015–2016	Motema Pembe	40	(0)
2016–2018	TP Mazembe		
2018–2019	Al-Ansar		
2019–2020	Renaissance		
2020–2022	Saint-Éloi		
2023–	Coastal Union	24	(0)

International career^{‡}
2010–2021	DR Congo	42	(0)
- * Club domestic league appearances and goals as of 24 June 2024 ‡ National team caps and goals as of 24 June 2024

Ley Matampi (born 18 April 1989) is a Congolese professional footballer who plays as a goalkeeper for Coastal Union.

== Honours ==
TP Mazembe

- Linafoot: 2012, 2013
- CAF Confederation Cup runner-up: 2013
