= Stoppila Sunzu =

Zambian footballer (born 1989)

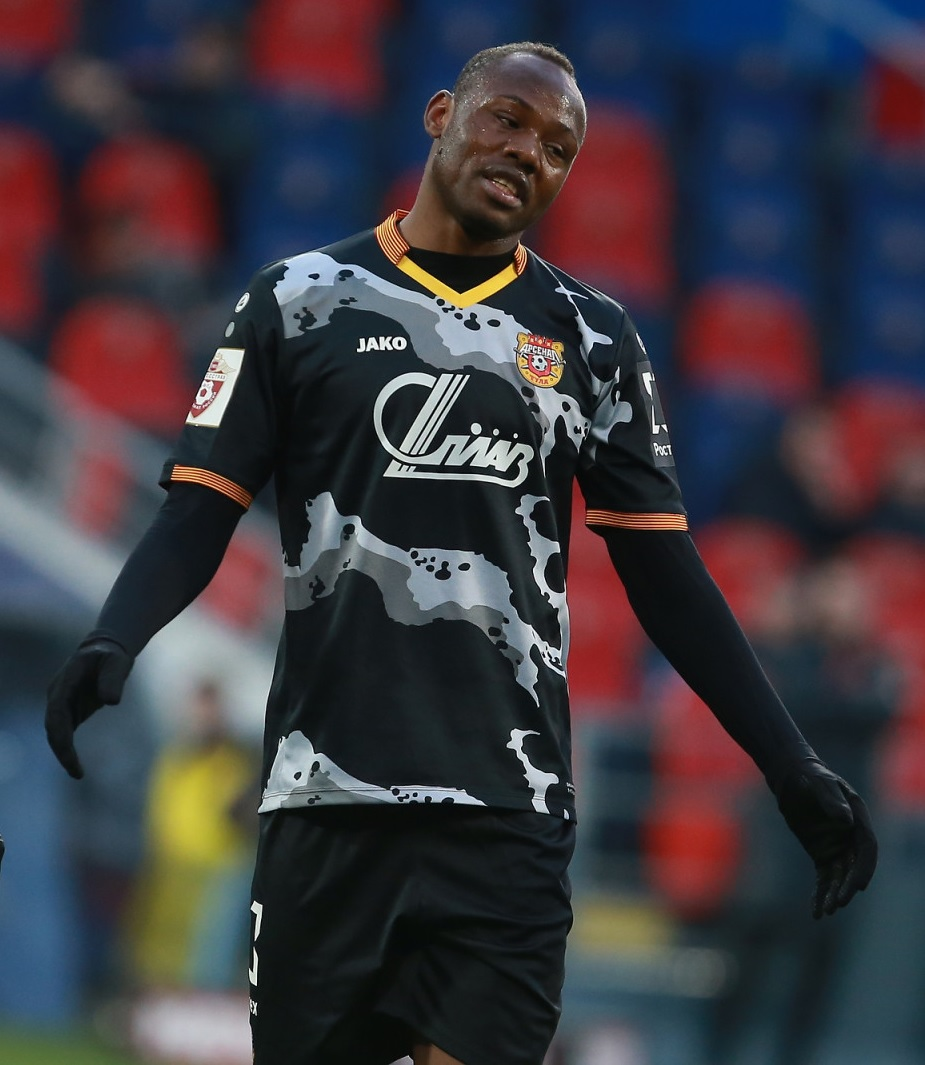
- Sunzu with Arsenal Tula in 2017

Personal information
- Full name: Stoppila Sunzu
- Date of birth: 22 June 1989 (age 37)
- Place of birth: Chingola, Zambia
- Height: 1.89 m (6 ft 2 in)
- Positions: Defender; defensive midfielder

Senior career*
Years	Team	Apps	(Gls)
2005–2007	Konkola Blades		
2007–2008	Afrisports		
2008–2010	Zanaco Lusaka	7	(0)
2008–2009	→ Châteauroux (loan)	0	(0)
2010–2014	TP Mazembe		
2014	Sochaux	27	(4)
2015–2016	Shanghai Shenhua	13	(1)
2015–2016	→ Lille (loan)	12	(1)
2015–2016	→ Lille B (loan)	3	(0)
2016–2018	Lille	4	(0)
2017	→ Arsenal Tula (loan)	13	(0)
2017–2018	→ Arsenal Tula (loan)	29	(2)
2018–2020	Metz	53	(2)
2020–2022	Shijiazhuang Ever Bright	52	(6)
2023	Jinan Xingzhou	21	(3)
2024	Cangzhou Mighty Lions	14	(1)
2024–2025	Changchun Yatai	38	(1)

International career^{‡}
2007	Zambia U20	41	(10)
2008–	Zambia	96	(6)
- * Club domestic league appearances and goals as of 22 November 2025 ‡ National team caps and goals as of 19 November 2024

Stoppila Sunzu (born 22 June 1989), also known as Stophira Sunzu, is a Zambian professional footballer who plays as a centre-back. He scored the winning penalty kick for Zambia in the 2012 Africa Cup of Nations final.

== Early life ==
Stoppila Sunzu was born in Chingola and is the younger brother of Felix Sunzu and the son of Felix Sunzu Sr, a goalkeeper who was originally from the Democratic Republic of Congo.

== Club career ==
=== Early career ===
He began his career with Afrisports of Kitwe. He was discovered at a U-16 tournament in Chambeshi, Zambia and he was referred to Afrisports.

He then joined Konkola Blades under a loan arrangement. After representing Zambia at the 2007 FIFA U-20 World Cup, the 19-year-old was invited for trials at the English side Reading. The Championship side was keen on securing him on a longer deal but due to work permit problems the move did not materialise. He signed a loan contract for Châteauroux in September 2008 and after the end of the season on 30 June 2009 returned to Zanaco FC.

=== TP Mazembe ===
In 2010, Sunzu transferred to TP Mazembe of Democratic Republic of Congo. His registration to Zanaco was a loan from Afrisports and there was some initial dispute regarding his move to TP Mazembe but it was eventually resolved. With Mazembe, he won domestic titles as well as the 2010 CAF Champions League. He was sent off in the club's opening 2010 FIFA Club World Cup game. In November 2012, he was shortlisted for the 2012 Africa-based Player of the Year award. In January 2013, he trained with Reading in the English Premier League with a view to being offered a contract. He returned to the 2013 African Cup of Nations without any contract being signed. Sunzu came to Reading on the premise of being a free agent, with his three-year contract expiring in December 2012. Moses Katumbi, president of TP Mazembe, accused Sunzu's handlers of lying to Reading about his contract stating that it does not expire until 2015.

=== Stints in France and China ===
On 6 January 2014, Sunzu joined French Ligue 1 club Sochaux-Montbéliard along with his teammate Nathan Sinkala. He scored important goals but could not prevent the relegation of the French side to Ligue 2.

On 29 December 2014, Sunzu transferred to Chinese Super League side Shanghai Greenland Shenhua. He made his debut and scored his first goal for Shanghai Greenland Shenhua on 8 March 2015, in a 6–2 victory against city rivals Shanghai Shenxin.

Sunzu was loaned to Lille for one year on 28 July 2015. In his first season there, he made 16 appearances scoring twice. On 10 July 2016, he joined Lille permanently on a three-year contract, for an undisclosed fee.

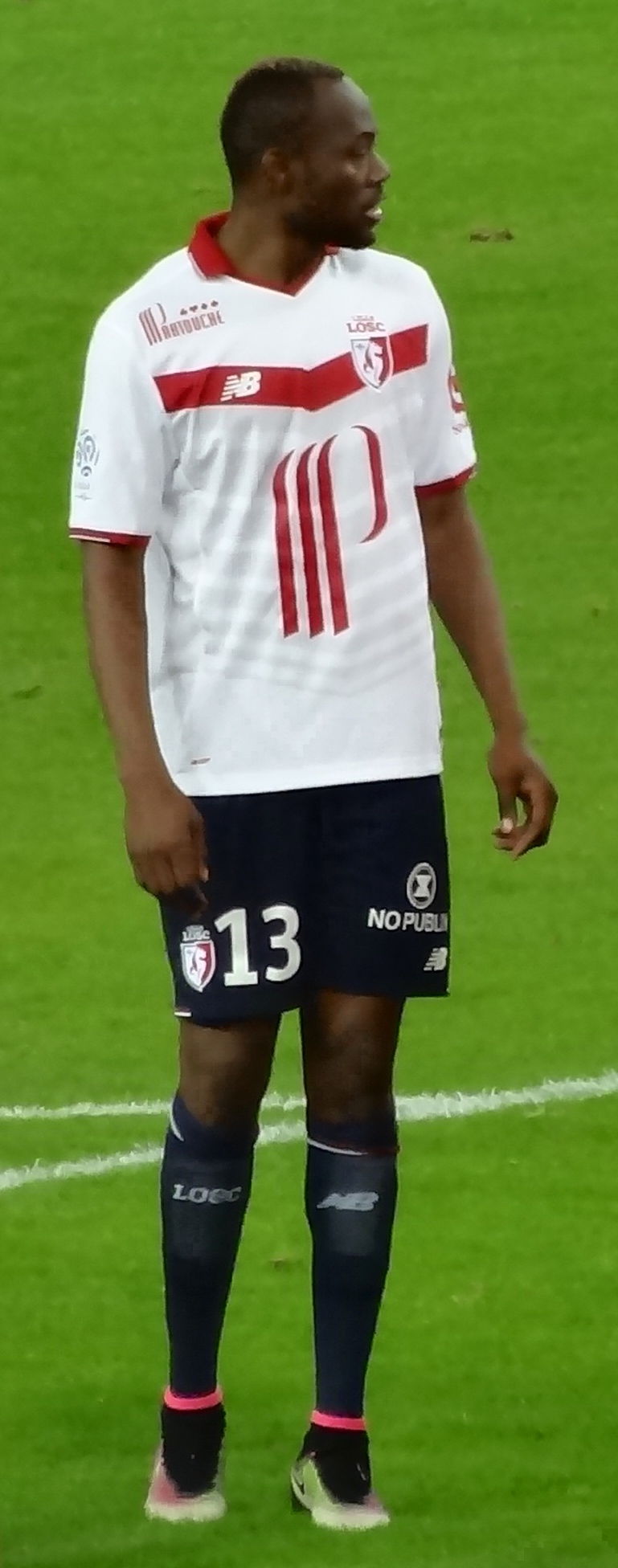
Sunzu at LOSC Lille

==== Arsenal Tula loans ====
On 3 February 2017, Sunzu signed a loan deal with the Russian Premier League club FC Arsenal Tula until the end of the 2016–17 season. At the time of the signing, Arsenal Tula claimed his player rights still belong to Shanghai Greenland Shenhua, and that is the club Arsenal loaned him from, despite earlier reports on him signing a permanent deal with Lille.

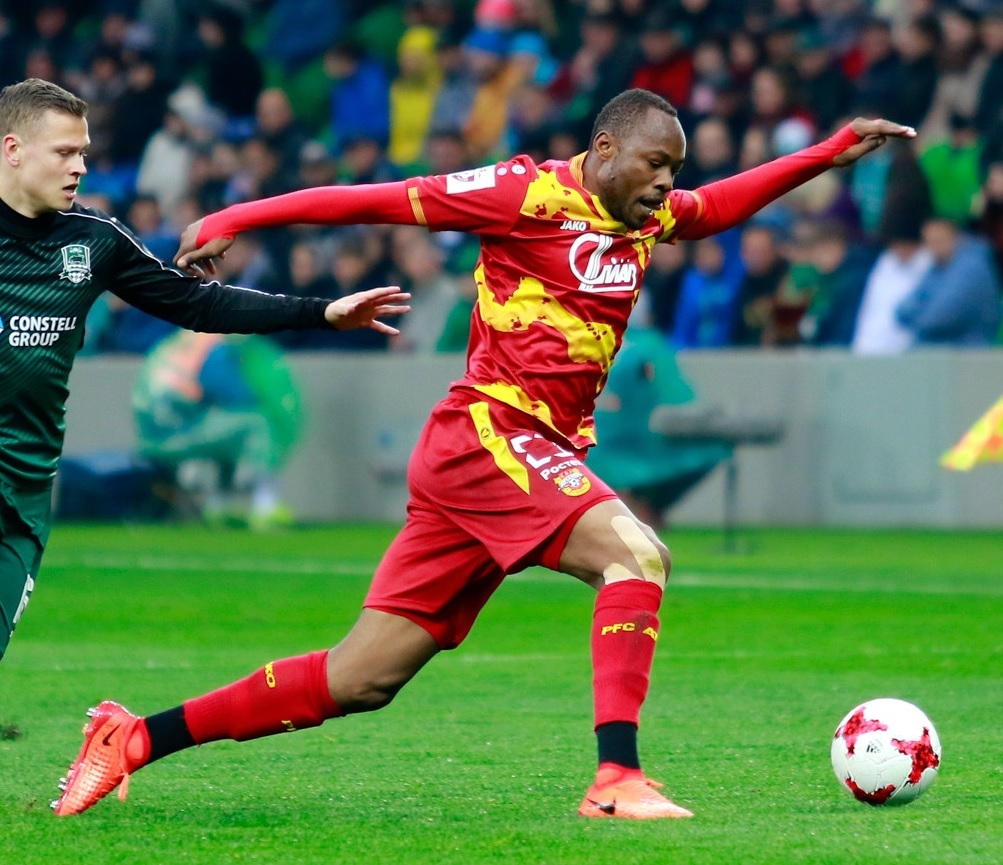
Sunzu against FC Krasnodar

In July 2017, he re-joined Arsenal Tula on loan for the 2017–18 season.

=== Metz ===
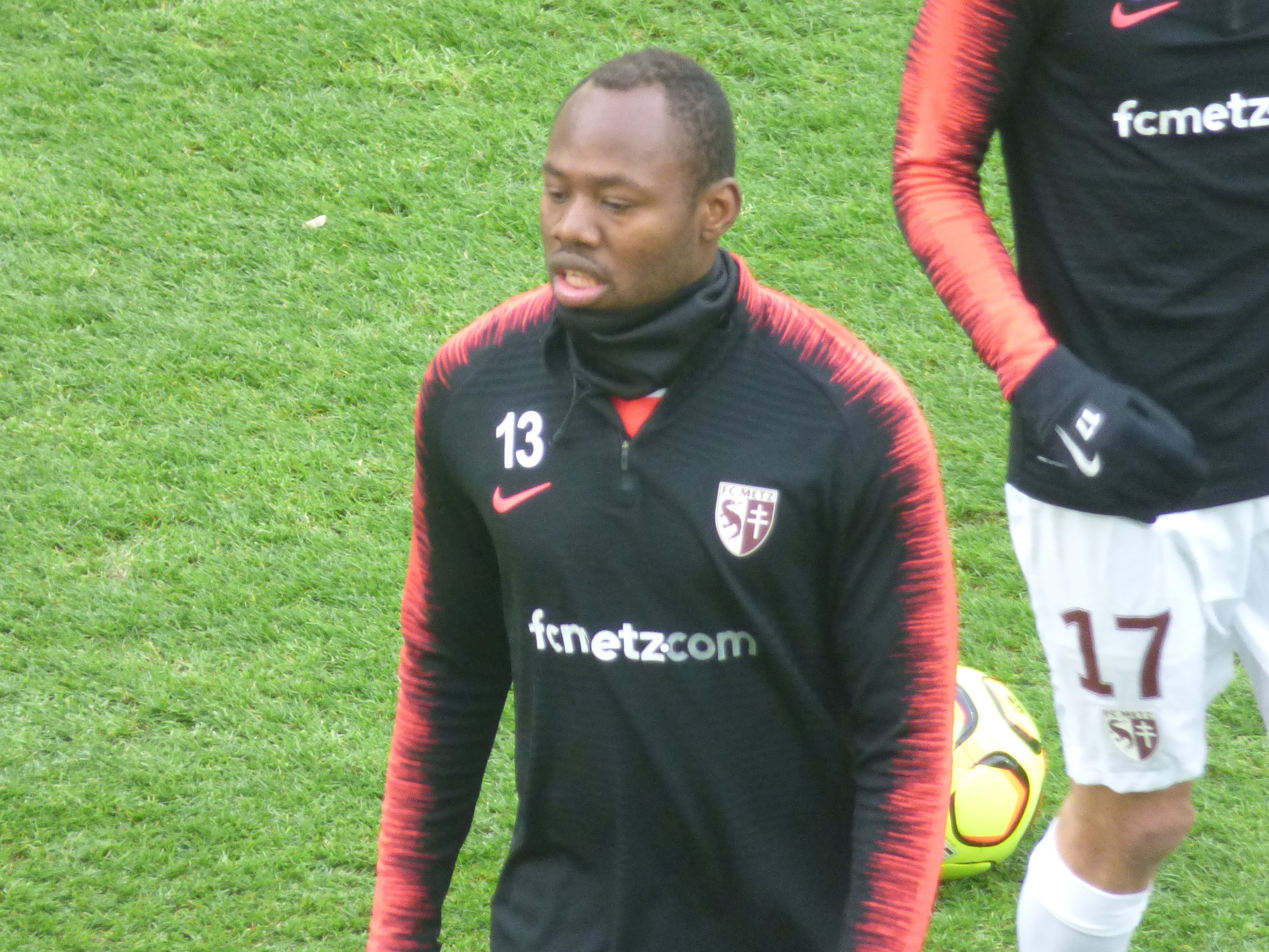
Sunzu at FC Metz before a match against RC Lens

On 9 July 2018, he returned to France, signing a two-year contract with FC Metz. He made his league debut for the club on 30 July 2018, playing all ninety minutes in a 1–0 away victory over Stade Brest. He scored his first competitive goal for the club on 19 October 2018 in a 3–0 league victory over Chamois Niortais. His goal, assisted by Marvin Gakpa, was scored in the 80th minute.

=== Shijiazhuang Ever Bright ===
In the 2019–20 winter transfer period, Sunzu left Metz to join Chinese Super League side Shijiazhuang Ever Bright.

=== Jinan Xingzhou ===
On 21 April 2023, Sunzu joined China League One side Jinan Xingzhou.

=== Return to Cangzhou Mighty Lions ===
On 29 February 2024, Sunzu rejoined Chinese Super League club Cangzhou Mighty Lions (previous name of Shijiazhuang Ever Bright).

=== Changchun Yatai ===
On 28 June 2024, Sunzu joined Chinese Super League club Changchun Yatai. Two days later, he made his debut for the club in a 5-0 home win against Qingdao Hainiu.

== International career ==
Sunzu represented his country at the 2007 FIFA U-20 World Cup in Canada. In that tournament, Zambia defeated an Uruguayan side that featured Luis Suárez and Edinson Cavani.

He made his full international debut against Botswana in a 2009 African Championship of Nations qualifier.

Sunzu scored the winning penalty of the penalty shoot-out in the final of the 2012 African Cup of Nations against Ivory Coast, which Zambia won 8–7.

In October 2013, due to a disagreement between their club TP Mazembe and the Zambian Football Association over international call-ups, Sunzu and two other players (Nathan Sinkala and Rainford Kalaba) were the subject of a Zambian arrest warrant. All three players later had their passports confiscated by Zambian immigration authorities, before being pardoned by the Zambian government.

In December 2025, Sunzu was named in Zambia's squad for the 2025 Africa Cup of Nations; this marked his sixth Africa Cup of Nations appearance, thereby equaling the participation record of Zambian players held by Kalusha Bwalya and Kennedy Mweene.

== Career statistics ==
=== Club ===
As of match played 22 November 2025

Appearances and goals by club, season and competition
Club	Season	League			National cup		League cup		Continental		Other		Total	
Club	Season	Division	Apps	Goals	Apps	Goals	Apps	Goals	Apps	Goals	Apps	Goals	Apps	Goals
Châteauroux (loan)	2008–09	Ligue 2	0	0	0	0	0	0	—		—		0	0
TP Mazembe	2010	Linafoot					—		11	0	0	0	11	10
TP Mazembe	2011	Linafoot					—		11	0	1	0	12	0
TP Mazembe	2012	Linafoot					—		11	0	—		11	0
TP Mazembe	2013	Linafoot					—		—		—		0	0
TP Mazembe	2013–14	Linafoot					—		—		—		0	0
TP Mazembe	Total						—		33	0	1	0	34	0
Sochaux	2013–14	Ligue 1	17	4	1	0	0	0	—		—		18	4
Sochaux	2014–15	Ligue 2	10	0	0	0	0	0	—		—		10	0
Sochaux	Total		27	4	1	0	0	0	—		—		28	4
Shanghai Shenhua	2015	Chinese Super League	13	1	0	0	—		—		—		13	1
Lille (loan)	2015–16	Ligue 1	12	1	1	0	3	1	—		—		16	2
Lille B (loan)	2016–17	CFA 2	3	0	—		—		—		—		3	0
Lille	2016–17	Ligue 1	4	0	0	0	1	0	0	0	—		5	0
Arsenal Tula (loan)	2016–17	Russian Premier League	13	0	—		—		—		1	0	14	0
Arsenal Tula (loan)	2017–18	Russian Premier League	28	2	1	0	—		—		—		29	2
Arsenal Tula (loan)	Total		41	2	1	0	—		—		1	0	43	2
Metz	2018–19	Ligue 2	36	2	3	0	3	0	—		—		42	2
Metz	2019–20	Ligue 1	17	0	0	0	1	0	—		—		18	0
Metz	Total		53	2	3	0	4	0	—		—		60	2
Shijiazhuang Ever Bright/ Cangzhou Mighty Lions	2020	Chinese Super League	19	4	0	0	—		—		—		19	4
Shijiazhuang Ever Bright/ Cangzhou Mighty Lions	2021	Chinese Super League	22	2	1	0	—		—		—		23	2
Shijiazhuang Ever Bright/ Cangzhou Mighty Lions	2022	Chinese Super League	11	0	0	0	—		—		—		11	0
Shijiazhuang Ever Bright/ Cangzhou Mighty Lions	Total		52	6	1	0	—		—		—		53	6
Jinan Xingzhou	2023	China League One	21	3	0	0	—		—		—		21	3
Cangzhou Mighty Lions	2024	Chinese Super League	14	1	0	0	—		—		—		14	1
Changchun Yatai	2024	Chinese Super League	12	1	0	0	—		—		—		12	1
Changchun Yatai	2025	Chinese Super League	26	0	0	0	—		—		—		26	0
Changchun Yatai	Total		38	1	1	0	—		—		—		38	1
Career total			278	21	7	0	8	1	33	0	2	0	318	22

=== International ===
As of 19 November 2024

Appearances and goals by national team and year
National team	Year	Apps	Goals
Zambia	2008	2	0
Zambia	2009	9	2
Zambia	2010	7	0
Zambia	2011	7	0
Zambia	2012	13	2
Zambia	2013	9	0
Zambia	2014	5	0
Zambia	2015	9	0
Zambia	2016	8	0
Zambia	2017	5	0
Zambia	2018	4	1
Zambia	2019	1	0
Zambia	2020	0	0
Zambia	2021	0	0
Zambia	2022	0	0
Zambia	2023	6	0
Zambia	2024	11	1
Total		96	6

Scores and results list Zambia's goal tally first.

No.	Date	Venue	Opponent	Score	Result	Competition
1.	12 August 2009	Brisbane Road, London, England	Ghana	1–2	1–4	Friendly
2.	25 October 2009	Barbourfields Stadium, Bulawayo, Zimbabwe	Namibia	1–0	1–0	2009 COSAFA Cup
3.	11 January 2012	Rand Stadium, Johannesburg, South Africa	South Africa	1–0	1–1	Friendly
4.	4 February 2012	Estadio de Bata, Bata, Equatorial Guinea	Sudan	1–0	3–0	2012 Africa Cup of Nations
5.	10 October 2018	Levy Mwanawasa Stadium, Ndola, Zambia	Guinea-Bissau	1–0	2–1	2019 Africa Cup of Nations qualification
6.	23 March 2024	Bingu National Stadium, Lilongwe, Malawi	Zimbabwe	1–0	2–2 (5–6 p)	2024 Four Nations Football Tournament

== Honours ==
Zanaco

- Zambian Premier League: 2009

TP Mazembe

- Super Ligue: 2011
- CAF Champions League: 2010
- CAF Super Cup: 2010, 2011

Zambia

- Africa Cup of Nations: 2012

Individual

- CAF Team of the Year: 2012
