= Mbwana Samatta =

Tanzanian footballer

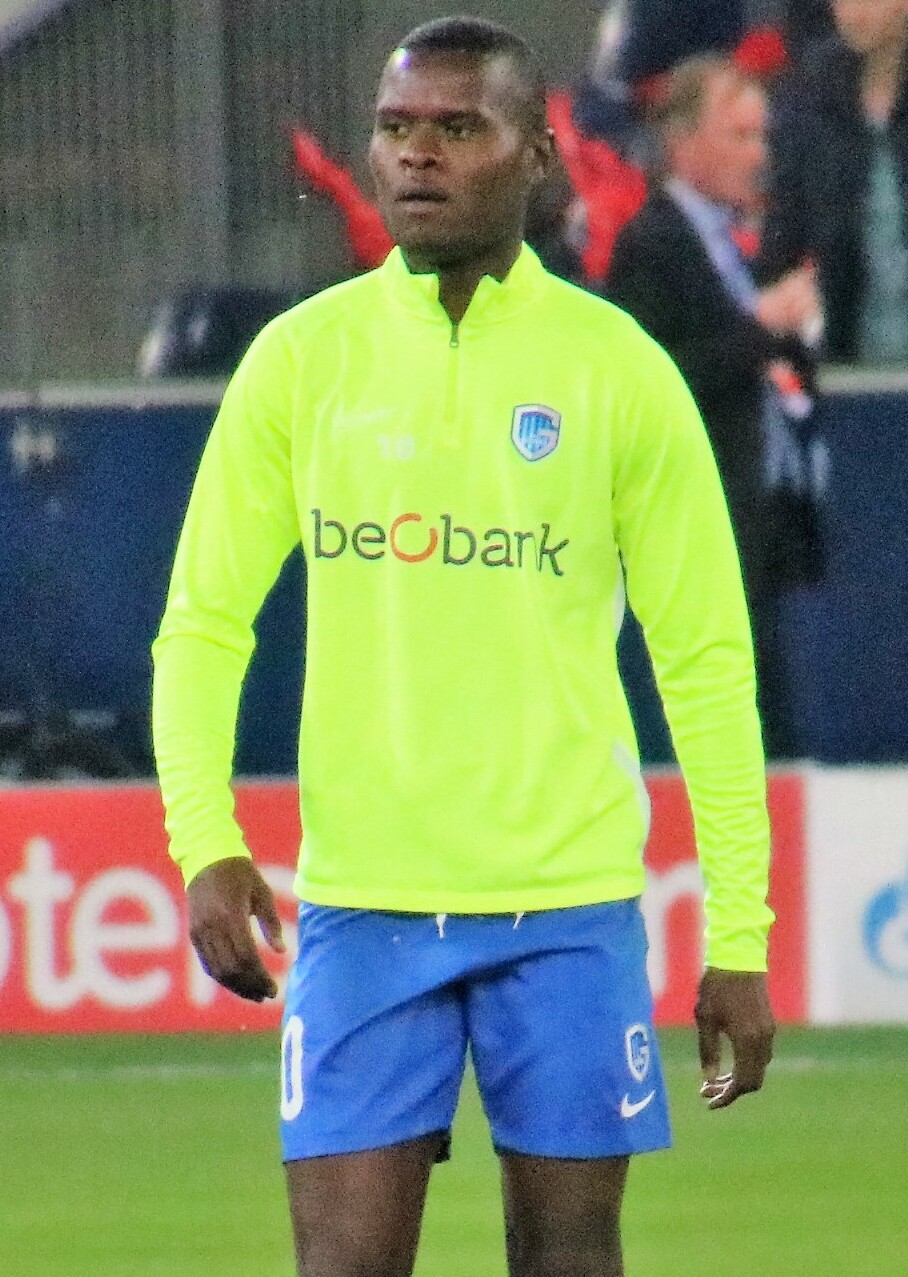
- Samatta with Genk in 2019

Personal information
- Full name: Mbwana Ally Samatta
- Date of birth: 23 December 1992 (age 33)
- Place of birth: Dar es Salaam, Tanzania
- Height: 1.83 m (6 ft 0 in)
- Position: Striker

Team information
- Current team: Le Havre
- Number: 25

Youth career
- 2008–2010: African Lyon

Senior career*
Years	Team	Apps	(Gls)
2010–2011	Simba SC	25	(13)
2011–2016	TP Mazembe	103	(60)
2016–2020	Genk	144	(56)
2020	Aston Villa	14	(1)
2020–2023	Fenerbahçe	30	(5)
2021–2022	→ Antwerp (loan)	32	(5)
2022–2023	→ Genk (loan)	33	(6)
2023–2025	PAOK	41	(6)
2025–	Le Havre	34	(5)

International career
2011–2026	Tanzania	89	(22)
- * Club domestic league appearances and goals as of 19:14, 18 October 2026 (UTC)

Mbwana Ally Samatta (born 23 December 1992) is a Tanzanian professional footballer who plays as a striker for Ligue 1 club Le Havre.

Samatta began his career as a youth player for Tanzanian club African Lyon in 2008. He turned professional in 2010 with Simba Sports Club, where he played for only half of the season before moving to TP Mazembe, spending a total of five years with them, initially becoming a first-team regular. He was named the 2015 African based Player of the Year and finished the season as the top goalscorer of the CAF Champions League, as he helped TP Mazembe to win the title.

In January 2016, Samatta signed for Belgian side Genk, helping them to qualify for the UEFA Europa League and win the Belgian Pro League in 2019. His twenty-goal tally saw him finish the season as the top scorer of the league; he also won the Ebony Shoe award in Belgium for his outstanding season with Genk.

In January 2020, Samatta moved to Aston Villa, becoming the first (and only) Tanzanian player to both play and score in the Premier League.

== Club career ==
Samatta was a key figure during TP Mazembe's run to the final of the 2015 CAF Champions League, scoring seven goals in the process and finishing as the competition's top scorer. In their group stage match against Moghreb Tétouan, Samatta scored a memorable hat-trick to secure a place in the semi-finals where they were drawn against Sudanese side Al-Merrikh SC. Mazembe would go on to lift the cup after defeating Algerian side USM Alger in the final 4–1 on aggregate, with Samatta scoring a goal in both legs.

At the Glo-CAF Awards on 7 January 2016 at the International Conference Centre in Abuja, Nigeria, he became the first player from East Africa to be crowned the CAF African Player of the Year. Mbwana garnered a total of 127 points, ahead of his TP Mazembe teammate and DR Congo goalkeeper Robert Kidiaba, who amassed 88 points, and Algerian Baghdad Bounedjah trailed in third place with 63 points.

=== Genk ===
In January 2016, after winning the prize for best African player on the continent, he signed a four-and-a-half-year contract with KRC Genk. He was voted the 2017 Most Influential Young Tanzanian in a ranking poll by Avance Media

On 23 August 2018, Samatta scored a hat-trick against Brøndby IF in the Europa League for a 5–2 win.

During the 2018–19 season, he led the Belgian First Division A in scoring with 20 goals, as Genk finished the season as league winners. In May 2019 he was awarded with the Ebony Shoe award for his exploits during the campaign.

=== Aston Villa ===
On 20 January 2020, Samatta signed a four-and-a-half-year contract with Premier League club Aston Villa. In doing so, he became the first Tanzanian to sign for a Premier League club. The transfer fee paid to Genk was reported as £8.5 million. Samatta made his debut for the club 8 days later in Villa's 2–1 EFL Cup semi-final second-leg win over Leicester City, a result which sealed the club's place in the final of the competition.

On 1 February 2020, Samatta scored on his league debut for Aston Villa, in a 2–1 defeat to Bournemouth. This made him the first player from Tanzania to play, and subsequently score in the Premier League. On 1 March 2020, Samatta scored his only other goal for the club in the EFL Cup final against Manchester City, but went on to lose the game 2-1.

=== Fenerbahçe ===
On 25 September 2020, Samatta joined Süper Lig club Fenerbahçe S.K. on an initial loan deal until the end of the season. As part of the deal, Samatta signed a four-year contract at the end of his loan spell in July 2021.

On 1 September 2021, Samatta joined Belgian side Royal Antwerp on a season-long loan.

On 16 August 2022, Samatta returned to Genk on loan, with an option to buy.

=== PAOK ===
On 17 July 2023, Super League Greece side PAOK announced the signing of Samatta on a two-year contract, with an option for one year more.

=== Le Havre ===
On 5 August 2025, Ligue 1 side Le Havre announced the signing of Samatta on a free transfer. The signing made Samatta the first Tanzanian signing for a Ligue 1 club.

== International career ==
Samatta was first called up to the Tanzania national team in 2011 and subsequently established himself as a key forward for the national side. On 24 March 2013, in a 2014 FIFA World Cup qualifier against Morocco, he scored twice to lead Tanzania to a 3–1 victory. He also scored against Cape Verde in a home match during the 2019 Africa Cup of Nations qualifiers, contributing to Tanzania's 2–0 victory.

On 13 June 2019, Samatta was included in Tanzania's final 23-man squad for the 2019 Africa Cup of Nations, announced by manager Emmanuel Amunike. He made his tournament debut on 23 June in the group-stage match against the Senegal national team. Tanzania also faced Kenya and Algeria in the tournament but were eliminated in the group stage. Samatta appeared in all three of Tanzania's matches and scored one goal.

In 2023, Samatta served as captain of the Tanzania national team at the 2023 Africa Cup of Nations. Tanzania lost 0–3 to Morocco in the group stage, before drawing 1–1 with Zambia and 0–0 with the DR Congo. Samatta played in all three matches, while Tanzania were eliminated in the group stage with two points.

In December 2025, Samatta was included as captain in Tanzania's final 28-man squad for the 2025 Africa Cup of Nations. Tanzania lost 1–2 to the Nigeria national team in the group stage, before drawing with Uganda and Tunisia, respectively, and advanced to the Africa Cup of Nations round of 16 for the first time in their history. Samatta appeared in four matches during the tournament, before Tanzania were eliminated by hosts Morocco in the round of 16.

== Personal life ==
Samatta is a Muslim. He made the umrah to Mecca in 2018 with his Genk teammate Omar Colley.

== Career statistics ==
=== Club ===
As of match played 18 October 2026

Appearances and goals by club, season and competition
Club	Season	League			National cup (Note: Includes Belgian Cup, FA Cup, Turkish Cup, Greek Football Cup)		League cup (Note: Includes EFL Cup)		Continental		Other		Total	
Club	Season	Division	Apps	Goals	Apps	Goals	Apps	Goals	Apps	Goals	Apps	Goals	Apps	Goals
Simba	2010–11	Tanzanian Premier League	25	13	—		—		2 (Note: Appearances in CAF Champions League)	2	—		27	15
TP Mazembe	2011	Linafoot	8	2	—		—		—		—		8	2
TP Mazembe	2012	Linafoot	29	23	—		—		6	6	—		35	29
TP Mazembe	2013	Linafoot	37	20	—		—		6	6	2 (Note: Appearances in CAF Confederation Cup)	2	45	28
TP Mazembe	2013–14	Linafoot	29	15	—		—		9	3	—		38	18
TP Mazembe	2014–15	Linafoot	—		—		—		7	8	—		7	8
TP Mazembe	2015–16	Linafoot	—		—		—		0	0	—		0	0
TP Mazembe	Total		103	60	—		—		28	23	2	2	133	85
Genk	2015–16	Belgian Pro League	18	5	0	0	—		—		—		18	5
Genk	2016–17	Belgian Pro League	37	13	4	2	—		18 (Note: Appearances in UEFA Europa League)	5	—		59	20
Genk	2017–18	Belgian Pro League	31	8	4	0	—		—		—		35	8
Genk	2018–19	Belgian Pro League	38	23	1	0	—		12	9	—		51	32
Genk	2019–20	Belgian Pro League	20	7	1	0	—		6 (Note: Appearances in UEFA Champions League)	3	1 (Note: Appearance in Belgian Super Cup)	0	28	10
Genk	Total		144	56	10	2	—		36	17	1	0	191	75
Aston Villa	2019–20	Premier League	14	1	0	0	2	1	—		—		16	2
Fenerbahçe (loan)	2020–21	Süper Lig	27	5	3	1	—		—		—		30	6
Fenerbahçe	2021–22	Süper Lig	3	0	0	0	—		0	0	—		3	0
Royal Antwerp (loan)	2021–22	Belgian Pro League	32	5	1	1	—		6	3	—		39	9
Genk (loan)	2022–23	Belgian Pro League	33	6	3	0	—		—		—		36	6
PAOK	2023–24	Super League Greece	29	2	3	0	—		12 (Note: Appearances in UEFA Europa Conference League)	1	—		44	3
PAOK	2024–25	Super League Greece	12	4	4	0	—		4 (Note: Appearances in UEFA Champions League)	1	—		20	5
PAOK	Total		41	6	7	0	—		16	2	—		64	8
Le Havre	2025–26	Ligue 1	27	3	0	0	—		—		—		27	3
Le Havre	2026–27	Ligue 1	7	2	0	0	—		—		—		7	2
Le Havre	Total		34	5	0	0	—		—		—		34	5
Career total			455	157	24	4	2	1	92	50	3	2	574	211

=== International ===
Appearances and goals by national team and year
National team	Year	Apps	Goals
Tanzania	2011	9	2
Tanzania	2012	5	0
Tanzania	2013	10	6
Tanzania	2014	3	1
Tanzania	2015	7	2
Tanzania	2016	4	1
Tanzania	2017	4	3
Tanzania	2018	5	2
Tanzania	2019	10	4
Tanzania	2020	1	0
Tanzania	2021	6	0
Tanzania	2022	5	1
Tanzania	2023	6	0
Tanzania	2024	8	0
Tanzania	2025	5	0
Tanzania	2026	1	0
Total		89	22

Scores and results list Tanzania's goal tally first, score column indicates score after each Samatta goal.

List of international goals scored by Mbwana Samatta
No.	Date	Venue	Opponent	Score	Result	Competition
1	26 March 2011	National Stadium, Dar es Salaam, Tanzania	Central African Republic	2–1	2–1	2012 Africa Cup of Nations qualification
2	3 September 2011	National Stadium, Dar es Salaam, Tanzania	Algeria	1–0	1–1	2012 Africa Cup of Nations qualification
3	11 January 2013	Addis Ababa Stadium, Addis Ababa, Ethiopia	Ethiopia	1–1	1–2	Friendly
4	6 February 2013	National Stadium, Dar es Salaam, Tanzania	Cameroon	1–0	1–0	Friendly
5	24 March 2013	National Stadium, Dar es Salaam, Tanzania	Morocco	2–0	3–1	2014 FIFA World Cup qualification
6	24 March 2013	National Stadium, Dar es Salaam, Tanzania	Morocco	3–0	3–1	2014 FIFA World Cup qualification
7	4 December 2013	Afraha Stadium, Nakuru, Kenya	Burundi	1–0	1–0	2013 CECAFA Cup
8	12 December 2013	Nyayo National Stadium, Nairobi, Kenya	Zambia	1–1	1–1	2013 CECAFA Cup
9	3 August 2014	Estádio do Zimpeto, Maputo, Mozambique	Mozambique	1–1	1–2	2015 Africa Cup of Nations qualification
10	7 October 2015	National Stadium, Dar es Salaam, Tanzania	Malawi	1–0	2–0	2018 FIFA World Cup qualification
11	14 November 2015	National Stadium, Dar es Salaam, Tanzania	Algeria	2–0	2–2	2018 FIFA World Cup qualification
12	23 March 2016	Stade Omnisports Idriss Mahamat Ouya, N'Djamena, Chad	Chad	1–0	1–0	2017 Africa Cup of Nations qualification
13	25 March 2017	National Stadium, Dar es Salaam, Tanzania	Botswana	1–0	2–0	Friendly
14	25 March 2017	National Stadium, Dar es Salaam, Tanzania	Botswana	2–0	2–0	Friendly
15	10 June 2017	National Stadium, Dar es Salaam, Tanzania	Lesotho	1–0	1–1	2019 Africa Cup of Nations qualification
16	27 March 2018	National Stadium, Dar es Salaam, Tanzania	DR Congo	1–0	2–0	Friendly
17	16 October 2018	National Stadium, Dar es Salaam, Tanzania	Cape Verde	2–0	2–0	2019 Africa Cup of Nations qualification
18	16 June 2019	Olympic Sports Center, Cairo, Egypt	Zimbabwe	1–1	1–1	Friendly
19	27 June 2019	30 June Stadium, Cairo, Egypt	Kenya	2–1	2–3	2019 Africa Cup of Nations
20	8 September 2019	National Stadium, Dar es Salaam, Tanzania	Burundi	1–0	1–1 (3–0 p)	2022 FIFA World Cup qualification
21	19 November 2019	Stade Mustapha Ben Jannet, Monastir, Tunisia	Libya	1–0	1–2	2021 Africa Cup of Nations qualification
22	23 March 2022	National Stadium, Dar es Salaam, Tanzania	Central African Republic	2–0	3–1	Friendly

== Honours ==
TP Mazembe

- Linafoot: 2011, 2012, 2013, 2013–14
- DR Congo Super Cup: 2013, 2014
- CAF Champions League: 2015

Genk

- Belgian Pro League: 2018–19
- Belgian Super Cup: 2019

Aston Villa

- EFL Cup runner-up: 2019–20

PAOK

- Super League Greece: 2023–24

Individual

- Linafoot Top scorer: 2012, 2013–14
- African Inter-Club Player of the Year: 2015
- CAF Team of the Year: 2015
- CAF Champions League Top scorer: 2015
- Ebony Shoe: 2019
- Belgian First Division A Golden Shoe: 2018–19
