= Mukoko Tonombe =

DR Congolese footballer

Personal information
- Full name: Serge Mukoko Tonombe
- Date of birth: 16 January 1996 (age 30)
- Place of birth: Matadi, Zaire
- Height: 1.86 m (6 ft 1 in)
- Position: Midfielder

Team information
- Current team: TP Mazembe
- Number: 30

Senior career*
Years	Team	Apps	(Gls)
2016–2018	Renaissance		
2018–2020	Vita Club		
2020–2022	Young Africans		
2022–	TP Mazembe	35	(0)

International career^{‡}
2019–	DR Congo	2	(0)
- * Club domestic league appearances and goals as of 17 January 2023 ‡ National team caps and goals as of 12 March 2021

Serge Mukoko Tomombe (born 16 January 1996) is a Congolese professional footballer who plays as a midfielder for Linafoot club TP Mazembe and the DR Congo national team.

== Playing career ==
Mukoko began his playing career with the Congolese clubs Renaissance and Vita Club. He moved to Tanzania with Young Africans on 18 August 2020.

== International career ==
Amale debuted with the DR Congo in a 3–2 friendly loss to Rwanda on 18 September 2019.
