= Trésor Mputu =

Congolese footballer

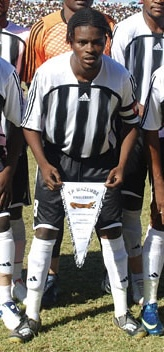
- Mputu with TP Mazembe

Personal information
- Full name: Trésor Mputu Mabi
- Date of birth: 10 December 1985 (age 40)
- Place of birth: Kinshasa, Zaire
- Height: 1.72 m (5 ft 8 in)
- Positions: Midfielder; striker

Youth career
- Jac Trésor FC

Senior career*
Years	Team	Apps	(Gls)
2000–2002	Kin City		
2002–2014	TP Mazembe	262	(142)
2014–2016	Kabuscorp	15	(4)
2016–2023	TP Mazembe	98	(13)

International career^{‡}
2004–2021	DR Congo	51	(14)
- * Club domestic league appearances and goals as of 11:54, 13 February 2023 (UTC) ‡ National team caps and goals as of 11:54, 13 February 2023 (UTC)

Trésor Mputu Mabi (born 10 December 1985) is a Congolese former professional footballer who played as a midfielder.

== Club career ==
Mputu joined TP Mazembe in 2002, and has been a pivotal figure in the club's success ever since. In 2007, he helped his club reach the African Champions League by becoming the top goalscorer of the competition with nine strikes, and the Confederation Cup.

In 2009 and 2010 he captained Mazembe to back to back CAF Champions League titles. Through the years Mputu has been linked with several European clubs and trialled with Arsenal in 2007.

In 2014 he signed with Angolan side Kabuscorp.

In July 2016, Mputu rejoined his old club TP Mazembe.

=== Suspension and return ===
In August 2010, Mputu received a 12-month global ban following his aggressive actions toward a referee during a match between TP Mazembe and Rwandan army side APR FC. Upon his return to action after a year on the sidelines, it took him just 46 seconds to find the net for his club against rivals TS Malkesa.

== International career ==
Mputu made his international debut in 2004 and has been a regular in the squad since. He represented his country at the 2006 African Cup of Nations tournament, and was captain of the Congolese national team, leading the side in the 2013 African Cup of Nations tournament in South Africa. In their first game of the tournament, Mputu scored for the Congolese in the 2–2 draw against pre-tournament favourites Ghana.

He was recalled to the national team in November 2018, following a five-year absence.

== Style of play ==
In 2012 former Cameroon and DR Congo coach Claude Le Roy described Mputu as being "the next Samuel Eto'o", whom he picked for the 1998 World Cup in France as a 17-year-old.

== Career statistics ==
=== Club ===
As of 20 December 2024

Appearances and goals by club, season and competition
Club	Season	League			CAF Champions League		CAF Confederation Cup		CAF Super Cup		FIFA Club World Cup	
Club	Season	Division	Apps	Goals	Apps	Goals	Apps	Goals	Apps	Goals	Apps	Goals
TP Mazembe	2003	Linafoot Ligue 2	20	11	-		-		-		-	
TP Mazembe	2004	Linafoot	30	34	-		-		-		-	
TP Mazembe	2005	Linafoot	29	22	-		-		-		-	
TP Mazembe	2006	Linafoot	25	15	-		-		-		-	
TP Mazembe	2007	Linafoot	27	15		9	7	10	-		-	
TP Mazembe	2008	Linafoot	23	11		3	-		-		-	
TP Mazembe	2009	Linafoot	28	18		6	-		-		2	0
TP Mazembe	2010	Linafoot	24	4		4	-		1	0	-	
TP Mazembe	2011	Linafoot			-		-		-		-	
TP Mazembe	2012	Linafoot	30	16	12	6	-		-		-	
TP Mazembe	2013	Linafoot	26	6	4	2	3	3	-		-	
TP Mazembe	Total		262	142		30	10	13	1	0	2	0
Kabuscorp	2014	Girabola	13	3		1	-		-		-	
Kabuscorp	2015	Girabola	2	1		1	-		-		-	
Kabuscorp	Total		15	4	4	2	0	0	0	0	0	0
TP Mazembe	2017	Linafoot	21	5	-		6	1	1	0	-	
TP Mazembe	2018	Linafoot	27	2	4	0	-		-		-	
TP Mazembe	2019	Linafoot	16	4	12	5	-		-		-	
TP Mazembe	2019–20	Linafoot	11	1	5	1	-		-		-	
TP Mazembe	2020–21	Linafoot	13	1	4	1	-		-		-	
TP Mazembe	2021–22	Linafoot	10	0	-		3	0	-		-	
TP Mazembe	Total		98	13		7	9	1	1	0		
Career total			375	159	69	39	19	14	2	0	2	0

=== International ===
As of matches played on 13 February 2023

Appearances and goals by national team and year
National team	Year	Apps	Goals
Congo DR	2004	1	0
Congo DR	2005	6	4
Congo DR	2006	4	1
Congo DR	2007	6	1
Congo DR	2008	5	1
Congo DR	2009	0	0
Congo DR	2010	1	0
Congo DR	2011	6	4
Congo DR	2012	8	2
Congo DR	2013	7	1
Congo DR	2014	0	0
Congo DR	2015	0	0
Congo DR	2016	0	0
Congo DR	2017	0	0
Congo DR	2018	1	0
Congo DR	2019	4	0
Congo DR	2021	2	0
Total		51	14

Scores and results list DR Congo's goal tally first, score column indicates score after each Mputu goal.

List of international goals scored by Trésor Mputu
No.	Date	Venue	Opponent	Score	Result	Competition
1	16 August 2005	Stade Olympique Yves-du-Manoir, Paris, France	Guinea	3–1	3–1	Friendly
2	4 September 2005	Stade des Martyrs, Kinshasa, DR Congo	Cape Verde	2–1	2–1	2006 FIFA World Cup qualification
3	8 October 2005	Kings Park Stadium, Durban, South Africa	Zambia	1–1	2–2	2010 FIFA World Cup qualification
4	11 November 2005	Stade Sébastien Charléty, Paris, France	Tunisia	1–0	2–2	Friendly
5	21 January 2006	Cairo Military Academy Stadium, Cairo, Egypt	Togo	1–0	2–0	2006 Africa Cup of Nations
6	22 August 2007	Stade des Martyrs, Kinshasa, DR Congo	Angola	3–1	3–1	Friendly
7	13 June 2008	El Hadj Hassan Gouled Aptidon Stadium, Djibouti City, Djibouti	Djibouti	6–0	6–0	2010 FIFA World Cup qualification
8	6 November 2011	High Performance Centre, Pretoria, South Africa	Lesotho	1–0	3–0	Friendly
9	11 November 2011	Somhlolo National Stadium, Lobamba, Swaziland	Swaziland	2–0	3–1	2014 FIFA World Cup qualification
10	15 November 2011	Stade des Martyrs, Kinshasa, DR Congo	Swaziland	1–0	5–1	2014 FIFA World Cup qualification
11	15 November 2011	Stade des Martyrs, Kinshasa, DR Congo	Swaziland	3–0	5–1	2014 FIFA World Cup qualification
12	29 February 2012	Stade Linité, Victoria, Seychelles	Seychelles	2–0	4–0	2013 Africa Cup of Nations qualification
13	10 June 2012	Stade des Martyrs, Kinshasa, DR Congo	Togo	1–0	2–0	2014 FIFA World Cup qualification
14	20 January 2013	Nelson Mandela Bay Stadium, Port Elizabeth, South Africa	Ghana	1–2	2–2	2013 Africa Cup of Nations

== Honours ==
Individual

- CAF Team of the Year: 2009
- Glo-CAF's Best African Player on the continent: 2009
- IFFHS World's Top Goal Scorer: 2007
- African Nations Championship player of the tournament: 2009
- BBC African Footballer of the Year: 2009 (nominated)
