= AS Kabasha =

- Full name: Association Sportive Kabasha
- Nickname(s): Les Verts et Noirs
- Founded: 1959
- Ground: Stade de l'Unité; Goma, DR Congo
- Capacity: 10,000
- League: Linafoot Ligue 2

Association Sportive Kabasha is a Congolese football club based in Goma, North Kivu province and currently playing in the Linafoot Ligue 2, the second level of the Congolese football.

They play in the Linafoot Ligue 2, the second level of professional football in DR Congo and their home games are played at Stade de l’Unité de Goma.

== History ==
Founded in 1959, AS Kabasha, won the Coupe du Congo in 2005 after defeating SC Cilu 4–2 on penalties.

After fourteen years of absence, Les Verts et Noirs, promoted back to Linafoot, winning the Eastern Zone of the 2020–21 Linafoot Ligue 2.

== Honours ==
- Coupe du Congo
  - Winners (1): 2005
- SuperCoupe du Congo
  - Runners-up (1): 2006

== Performance in CAF competitions ==
- CAF Confederation Cup: 1 appearance

2006 – Preliminary Round
