= 2025–26 Linafoot =

Linafoot (Illicocash Ligue 1)
- Season: 2025-26
- All statistics correct as of 4 April 2026.

The 2025–26 Linafoot is the 65th season of the Linafoot, the top-tier football league in the Democratic Republic of the Congo, since its establishment in 1958.

Aigles du Congo are the defending champions.

== League table ==
=== Group A ===
As of 4 April 2026

Pos	Team	Pld	W	D	L	GF	GA	GD	Pts	
1	Mazembe (Q)	27	20	4	3	50	11	+39	64	Qualification to Championship round
2	Saint-Eloi Lupopo (Q)	27	19	6	2	52	15	+37	63	Qualification to Championship round
3	Don Bosco (Q)	27	15	7	5	39	22	+17	52	Qualification to Championship round
4	Simba (Q)	27	13	8	6	33	24	+9	47	Qualification to Championship round
5	Blessing	27	11	7	9	33	23	+10	40	Qualification to Championship round
6	Lubumbashi Sport	28	10	9	9	24	24	0	39	Qualification to Championship round
7	Manika	27	8	13	6	22	18	+4	37	
8	Saint-Luc	27	10	7	10	20	26	−6	37	
9	Tanganyika	27	10	6	11	25	26	−1	36	
10	Sanga Balende	27	9	5	13	22	30	−8	32	
11	Tshinkunku	26	7	9	10	19	32	−13	30	
12	New Soger	27	8	5	14	24	34	−10	29	
13	Malole	27	7	6	14	25	34	−9	27	
14	Groupe Bazano	28	6	9	13	23	35	−12	27	Relegation to the Linafoot Ligue 2
15	Tshikas	28	4	9	15	23	41	−18	21	Relegation to the Linafoot Ligue 2
16	Panda (R)	27	4	2	21	14	53	−39	14	Relegation to the Linafoot Ligue 2

Source: soccerway.com
Rules for classification: 1) points; 2) goal difference; 3) number of goals scored
(Q) Qualified for the phase indicated; (R) Relegated

=== Group B ===
As of 4 April 2026

Pos	Team	Pld	W	D	L	GF	GA	GD	Pts	
1	Vita Club (Q)	24	11	11	2	29	10	+19	44	Qualification to Championship round
2	Aigles du Congo	22	11	9	2	25	11	+14	42	Qualification to Championship round
3	Maniema Union	22	10	11	1	27	10	+17	41	Qualification to Championship round
4	Dauphins Noirs	22	10	5	7	29	20	+9	35	Qualification to Championship round
5	Celeste	22	9	7	6	27	11	+16	34	Qualification to Championship round
6	Rangers	23	7	8	8	20	25	−5	29	Qualification to Championship round
7	Motema Pembe	21	5	13	3	25	19	+6	28	
8	Etoile de Kivu	22	7	6	9	26	30	−4	27	
9	New Jack	24	6	9	9	19	25	−6	27	
10	Etancheite	24	6	8	10	15	29	−14	26	
11	Anges Verts	22	5	10	7	23	26	−3	25	
12	Olympique Renaissance	21	4	9	8	12	20	−8	21	
13	Renaissance du Congo	24	3	12	9	18	35	−17	21	
14	Bukavu Dawa	23	2	6	15	9	33	−24	12	Relegation to the Linafoot Ligue 2
15	Martin Pecheur (R)	0	0	0	0	0	0	0	0	Disqualified

Source: soccerway.com
Rules for classification: 1) points; 2) goal difference; 3) number of goals scored
(Q) Qualified for the phase indicated; (R) Relegated

== Championship round ==
As of 4 April 2026

Pos	Team	Pld	W	D	L	GF	GA	GD	Pts	
1	Don Bosco	0	0	0	0	0	0	0	0	Qualification to CAF Champions League
2	Mazembe	0	0	0	0	0	0	0	0	Qualification to CAF Champions League
3	Saint-Eloi Lupopo	0	0	0	0	0	0	0	0	Qualification to CAF Confederation Cup
4	Simba	0	0	0	0	0	0	0	0	
5	Vita Club	0	0	0	0	0	0	0	0	
6	TBD	0	0	0	0	0	0	0	0	
7	TBD	0	0	0	0	0	0	0	0	
8	TBD	0	0	0	0	0	0	0	0	
9	TBD	0	0	0	0	0	0	0	0	
10	TBD	0	0	0	0	0	0	0	0	
11	TBD	0	0	0	0	0	0	0	0	
12	TBD	0	0	0	0	0	0	0	0	

Source: soccerway.com
Rules for classification: 1) points; 2) goal difference; 3) number of goals scored
