= Mwana =

Mwana may refer to

- Mwana (name)
- Mwana Mwinga, a settlement in Kenya
- Mwana Africa F.C., a Zimbabwean football club
- Aie a Mwana, a song by Daniel Vangarde and Jean Kluger
