= DR Congo Super Cup =

The DR Congo Super Cup is a Congolese association football competition, which takes place in an annual match between the Linafoot champion team and the winners of the Coupe du Congo since 2002.

== History ==
In 1984 and 1987, the super cup brought together the winner of the Coupe du Congo and the winner of the Papa Kalala Challenge (1982-1989).

The 1994 and 1995 editions were between the winner of the Coupe du Congo and the winner of the Independence Cup (1992-1997). Since 2002, it has been between the winner of the Linafoot and the winner of the Cup. In recent years the competition has not been played.

== Format ==
- 1984-1987: Coupe du Congo Winner vs Papa Kalala Challenge Winner
- 1994-1997: Coupe du Congo Winner vs Independence Cup Winner
- 2002-2016: Linafoot Champions vs Coupe du Congo Winner

== Finals ==
Super Coupe du Zaïre/Congo

| Year | Winner | Score | Runner-up |
|---|---|---|---|
| 1984 | CS Imana | won | AS Bilima |
| 1987 | CS Imana | 1-0 | FC Kalamu |
| 1994 | CS Imana | 3-0 | AS Vita Club |
| 1995 | AS Bantous | won | AC Sodigraf |
| 1997 | AS Dragons (Kinshasa) | 0-0; 4-2 pen | AS Vita Club |

- Other years unknown.

Linafoot era

| Year | Winner | Score | Runner-up |
|---|---|---|---|
| 2002 | FC Saint-Éloi Lupopo | won | US Kenya |
| 2003 | DC Motema Pembe | w/o | AS Vita Club |
| 2004 | SC Cilu | 1-1; 6-5 pen | DC Motema Pembe |
| 2005 | DC Motema Pembe | 2-1 | AS Vita Kabasha |
| 2013 | TP Mazembe | 7-0 | FC MK Etanchéité |
| 2014 | TP Mazembe | 3-0 | FC MK Etanchéité |
| 2015 | AS Vita Club | 3-0 | FC Saint-Éloi Lupopo |
| 2016 | TP Mazembe | 3-1 | FC Renaissance du Congo |

- 2006-2012 not held

== Performance by club ==
| | Club | City | Titles | Years |
|---|---|---|---|---|
| 1 | DC Motema Pembe (incl. Imana) | Kinshasa | 5 | 1984, 1987, 1994, 2003, 2005 |
| 2 | TP Mazembe | Lubumbashi | 3 | 2013, 2014, 2016 |
| 3 | AS Vita Club | Kinshasa | 1 | 2015 |
| 3 | FC Saint Eloi Lupopo | Lubumbashi | 1 | 2002 |
| 3 | SC Cilu | Lubumbashi | 1 | 2004 |
| 3 | AS Bantous | Kinshasa | 1 | 1995 |
| 3 | AS Dragons | Kinshasa | 1 | 1997 |

== Other DR Congo super cup competitions ==
=== Super Coupe de Kinshasa ===
Played between the EPFKIN (Entente Provinciale de Football de Kinshasa) champions and the newly promoted clubs at the start of the season.

- 2001: DC Motema Pembe (Kinshasa) bt AC Bandal (Kinshasa)
- 2002: AS Vita Club (Kinshasa) - FC Système (Kinshasa) 2-0
- 2003: Olympic Club Kinshasa bt AS Vita Club (Kinshasa)
- 2004: DC Motema Pembe (Kinshasa) - AC Kintainers (Kinshasa) 1-0
- 2005: AS Vita Club (Kinshasa) - FC Nzakimuena (Kinshasa) 4-0
- 2006: AS Vita Club (Kinshasa) - ATT Sport (Kinshasa) 2-0
- 2007: AS Pharmagros (Kinshasa) - FC Tornado (Kinshasa) 1-0
- 2008: DC Motema Pembe (Kinshasa) - US Amazone (Kinshasa) 3-0
- 2009: ATT Sport (Kinshasa) - Stade Kinois (Kinshasa) 1-1, [4-1 pen]
- 2010: US Filas (Kinshasa) - AS Vita Club (Kinshasa) 3-2
- 2011-13: not known
- 2014: AC Bandal (Kinshasa) - New Jack (Kinshasa) 3-1

== See also ==
- Coupe du Congo
