= Coupe du Congo (DR Congo) =

Tournament in Congolese football

- Founded: 1958
- Region: (Democratic Republic of the Congo) DR Congo
- Current champions: AS Simba (2025) (1 title)
- Most championships: DC Motema Pembe (15 titles)
- 2025 Coupe du Congo

The Coupe du Congo is the top knockout tournament of the Congolese (DR Congo) football. It officially started in 1958 and it has served as the country's main competition to determine the national champion (1958-1989, and 1992-1997)) or the cup winner (1990-1991 and 1998-present).

== History ==
In 1950 a cup tournament was played in a week-long competition with the final on May 1, 1950, at the Stade Leopold II in Elisabethville (now Lubumbashi), with an attendance of over 40,000. Selctions of regional provincies participated instead of clubs.

The first official competition of the Coupe de l'A.R.S.C.U. was played in 1958. FC Saint-Éloi Lupopo (Elizabethville) was the first winner. The 1959 was not concluded and it was not held until 1963. In 1964 the Cup was renamed to Coupe du Congo and also served as the national championship from 1964 to 1989 and from 1992 to 1997. (Note: Some city name changes (mostly mid-1966): Bakwanga to Mbuji-Mayi, Coquilhatville to Mbandaka, Elisabethville to Lubumbashi, Jadotville to Likasi, Léopoldville to Kinshasa, Luluabourg to Kananga, Stanleyville to Kisangani, Thysville to Mbanza-Ngungu)

The tournaments for the sixth (1969) and seventh (1970) edition of the Coupe du Congo were not finished and the title was not awarded in either year, but TP Englebert (1969) and AS Vita Club (1970) were chosen to represent the country in the African Champions Cup in the following year. Those "titles" are not included in the list below.

While the Coupe du Congo served as the national championship before Linafoot was created, they were other competitions considered as cup tournaments: the Papa Kalala Challenge (1982-1989) and the Independence Cup (1992-1997). Since 1998, the Coupe du Congo is the country's primer Cup competition (likewise in 1991).

=== Format ===
The four tournaments from 1965 to 1968 were decided in a mini-group stage with three or four participants, and no final was played.

=== Name history ===
- 1958-59: Coupe de l'A.R.S.C.U. (as national championship)
- 1964-1971: Coupe du Congo (as national championship)
- 1972-1989: Coupe du Zaïre (as national championship)
- 1990-1991: Coupe du Zaïre (as national cup tournament)
- 1992-1996: Coupe du Zaïre (as national championship)
- 1997: Coupe du Congo (as national championship)
- 1998-present: Coupe du Congo (as national cup tournament)

== List of finals ==
As national championship

Winner per year

Year	Winner	Score	Runner-up
1958	FC Saint-Éloi Lupopo (Elizabethville)	5-1	AS Vita Club (Léopoldville)
1959	Not finished		
1960-1963	Not played		
1964	CS Imana (Léopoldville)	3-1	FC Saint-Éloi Lupopo (Elizabethville)
1965	AS Bilima (Léopoldville)		FC Panda (Jadotville)
1966	TP Englebert (Elizabethville)		Union Saint-Gilloise (Luluabourg)
1967	TP Englebert (Lubumbashi)		Sporting (Kisangani)
1968	FC Saint-Éloi Lupopo (Lubumbashi)		AS Vita Club (Kinshasa)
1969-1970	Competition cancelled		
1971	AS Vita Club (Kinshasa)	2-2 / 2-0	FC Renaissance (Kisangani)
1972	AS Vita Club (Kinshasa)	3-2 / 2-1	TP Mazembe (Lubumbashi)
1973	AS Vita Club (Kinshasa)	9-1 / 2-1	FC Saint-Éloi Lupopo (Lubumbashi)
1974	CS Imana (Kinshasa)	1-1 / 0-0 e	SM Sanga Balende (Mbuji-Mayi)
1975	AS Vita Club (Kinshasa)		US Tshinkunku (Kananga)
1976	TP Mazembe (Lubumbashi)	4-1 / 0-1	SM Sanga Balende (Mbuji-Mayi)
1977	AS Vita Club (Kinshasa)		AS Inga Sport (Inga)
1978	CS Imana (Kinshasa)	2-1 / 1-1	TP Mazembe (Lubumbashi)
1979	AS Bilima (Kinshasa)	1-1 / 5-0	CS Mokanda (Mbandaka)
1980	AS Vita Club (Kinshasa)	1-0	Lubumbashi Sport (Lubumbashi)
1981	FC Saint-Éloi Lupopo (Lubumbashi)	1-1 / 1-1 pen. (5-4)	AS Vita Club (Kinshasa)
1982	AS Bilima (Kinshasa)	1-0 / 1-1	TP Mazembe (Lubumbashi)
1983	SM Sanga Balende (Mbujimayi)	1-1 /2-2	AS Bilima (Kinshasa)
1984	AS Bilima (Kinshasa)	0-0 / 3-0	OC Muungano (Bukavu)
1985	US Tshinkunku (Kananga)	1-3 / 2-0	AS Bilima (Kinshasa)
1986	FC Saint-Éloi Lupopo (Lubumbashi)	0-1 / 2-0	BC Zaïre (Kinshasa)
1987	DC Motema Pembe (Kinshasa)	1-0 / 4-0	TP Mazembe (Lubumbashi)
1988	AS Vita Club (Kinshasa)	1-0	DC Motema Pembe (Kinshasa)
1989	DC Motema Pembe (Kinshasa)	0-0 / 2-2	TP Mazembe (Lubumbashi)

As national cup

Year	Winner	Score	Runner-up
1990		not held	
1991	DC Motema Pembe (Kinshasa)	1-0	US Bilombe (Kinshasa)

As national championship

Year	Winner	Score	Runner-up
1992	US Bilombe (Bilombe)		FC Scibe (Matadi)
1993	AS Vita Club (Kinshasa)	1-1 3-0	AS Bantous (Mbuji-Mayi)
1994	AS Vita Club (Kinshasa)	1-2 4-2	SM Sanga Balende (Mbuji-Mayi)
1995	AS Bantous (Mbuji-Mayi)	0-0, 2-2 e	AS Vita Club (Kinshasa)
1996	DC Motema Pembe (Kinshasa)	3-0 0-2	AS Bantous (Mbuji-Mayi)
1997	AS Vita Club (Kinshasa)	0-0 0-0 pen. (5-4)	DC Motema Pembe (Kinshasa)

As national cup

Year	Winner	Score	Runner-up
1998	AS Dragons(Kinshasa)	1-0	AS Sucrière (Kwilu Ngongo)
1999	AS Dragons (Kinshasa)	3-2 a.p.	AS Paulino (Kinshasa)
2000	TP Mazembe (Lubumbashi)	2-0	AS Saint-Luc (Kananga)
2001	AS Vita Club (Kinshasa)	3-0	AS Veti Club (Matadi)
2002	US Kenya (Lubumbashi)	2-1	SM Sanga Balende (Mbuji-Mayi)
2003	DC Motema Pembe (Kinshasa)	2-0	TP Mazembe (Lubumbashi)
2004	SC Cilu (Lukala)	1-0	AS Saint-Luc (Kananga)
2005	AS Kabasha (Goma)	1-1 pen. (4-2)	SC Cilu (Lukala)
2006	DC Motema Pembe (Kinshasa)	4-1	AS Dragons (Kinshasa)
2007	AS Maniema Union (Kindu)	2–1	FC Saint-Éloi Lupopo (Lubumbashi)
2008	OC Bukavu Dawa (Bukavu)	2-0	DC Virunga (Goma)
2009	DC Motema Pembe (Kinshasa)	0-0 pen. (5-4)	AS Dragons (Kinshasa)
2010	DC Motema Pembe (Kinshasa)	3-0	AS Ndoki a Ndombe (Boma)
2011	US Tshinkunku (Kananga)	1-1 pen. (4-3)	AS Veti Club (Matadi)
2012	CS Don Bosco (Lubumbashi)	4-0	AS Veti Club (Matadi)
2013	FC MK Etanchéité (Kinshasa)	1-0	AS Vutuka (Kikwit)
2014	FC MK Etanchéité (Kinshasa)	1-0	FC Saint-Éloi Lupopo (Lubumbashi)
2015	FC Saint-Éloi Lupopo (Lubumbashi)	1-0	Katumbi FA (Lubumbashi)
2016	FC Renaissance (Kinshasa)	2-0	CS Don Bosco (Lubumbashi)
2017	AS Maniema Union	1-1 pen. (4-1)	FC Saint-Éloi Lupopo
2018	AS Nyuki	2-1	JS Kinshasa
2019	AS Maniema Union	1-1 pen. (5-3)	FC Renaissance (Kisangani)
2020	Compétition abandoned due to Covid-19		
2021	DC Motema Pembe (Kinshasa)	1-0	SM Sanga Balende (Mbuji-Mayi)
2022	DC Motema Pembe (Kinshasa)	1-0	Académic Club Rangers (Kinshasa)
2023	Cancelled'		
2024	AS Vita Club (Kinshasa)	1-0	FC Céleste (Mbandaka)
2025	AS Simba (Kinshasa)	1-0	FC MK Etanchéité (Kinshasa)

== Total titles per club ==
Club	Titles
DC Motema Pembe (Kinshasa) (Includes CS Imana)	15
AS Vita Club (Kinshasa)	10
AS Dragons (Kinshasa) (Includes AS Bilima)	5
TP Mazembe (Lubumbashi) (Includes TP Englebert)	5
AS Kalamu (Kinshasa)	4
FC Saint-Éloi Lupopo (Lubumbashi)	3
AS Maniema Union (Kindu)	3
FC MK Etanchéité (Kinshasa)	2
FC Lubumbashi Sport	1
AC Sodigraf (Kinshasa)	1
AS Vita Kabasha (Goma)	1
US Kenya (Lubumbashi)	1
SC Cilu (Lukala)	1
US Bilombe (Bilombe)	1
OC Bukavu Dawa (Bukavu)	1
US Tshinkunku (Kananga)	1
CS Don Bosco (Lubumbashi)	1
FC Renaissance (Kinshasa)	1
AS Nyuki (Butembo)	1
AS Simba (Kolwezi)	1

== Records and statistics ==
- Pierre Kasongo was the first goalscorer in the history of the cup, in a 5-1 victory for St Eloi against AS Vita Club in the final on 27 December 1958.
- Pierre Ndaye Mulamba is the only player to have scored 6 goals in a cup final, in the final against FC Lupopo in 1973.
- Platini Mpiana is the only player to win the competition with 3 different clubs (AS Maniema Union in 2019, DCMP Imana in 2022 and AS Vita Club in 2024).

== Players ==
=== Most finals ===
This list is incomplete.

Player	Total	Years won	Years lost
(Democratic Republic of the Congo) Ndaye Mulamba	7	1972, 1973, 1975, 1977, 1980, 1988	1981
(Democratic Republic of the Congo) Epangala Lukose	4	1993, 1994, 1997	1995
(Democratic Republic of the Congo) N'Dinga Mbote	3	1988, 1997, 2001	-
(Democratic Republic of the Congo) Platini Mpiana	3	2019, 2022, 2024	-
(Democratic Republic of the Congo) Pierre Kalala Mukendi	3	1966, 1967	1972
(Democratic Republic of the Congo) Mpangi Merikani	3	1987, 1989	1988

== Other DR Congo cup competitions ==
=== Governor General's Cup (1950) ===
It was played between regional or city selections during colonial time.

- 1950: Katanga - Léopoldville 2-1

=== Challenge Papa Kalala (1982-1989) ===
The winners qualified for the CAF Cup Winners Cup.

- 1982: AS Vita Club (Kinshasa)
- 1983: AS Vita Club (Kinshasa) - FC St-Eloi Lupopo (Lubumbashi) 2-1
- 1984: CS Imana (Kinshasa) - AS Vita Club (Kinshasa) 1-2, 1-0 [Imana on away goals]
- 1985: DC Motema Pembe (Kinshasa) - FC Kalamu (Kinshasa) 2-0
- 1986: FC Kalamu (Kinshasa)
- 1987: FC Kalamu (Kinshasa)
- 1988: FC Kalamu (Kinshasa) - DC Motema Pembe (Kinshasa) 1-0
- 1989: FC Kalamu (Kinshasa)

=== Coupe de la Fécofa (2001-2003) ===
- 2001: Utexafrica (Kinshasa) - Inter (Kinshasa) 0-0 [aet, 4-1 pen]
- 2002: DC Motema Pembe (Kinshasa) - Inter (Kinshasa) 1-0
- 2003: abandoned

=== Coupe de l'Indépendance (1992-1997) ===
- 1992: DC Motema Pembe (Kinshasa) - AS Vita Club (Kinshasa) 0-0 1-0
- 1993: DC Motema Pembe (Kinshasa) - AS Bilima (Kinshasa) 2-1
- 1994: DC Motema Pembe (Kinshasa) - AS Bantous (Mbuji-Mayi) 2-0
- 1995: AC Sodigraf (Kinshasa) - DC Mbongo Sport (Mbuji-Mayi) 4-0
- 1996: AS Bilima (Kinshasa) - AC Sodigraf (Kinshasa) 3-2
- 1997: AS Dragons (Kinshasa) - AS Vita Club (Kinshasa) 2-1

=== Jeux Congolais/Zaïrois (1967-1974) ===
Multisports events held on three occasions; the first two were staged in Kinshasa, the third in Lubumbashi.

- 1967: Katanga - Kinshasa 3-2
- 1972: CS Imana (Kinshasa)
- 1974: CS Imana (Kinshasa) - TP Englebert (Lubumbashi) 3-2

== See also ==
- Linafoot
- DR Congo Super Cup
