= Papi Kimoto =

DR Congolese football manager and player

Personal information
- Full name: Papy Okitankoyi Kimoto
- Date of birth: 22 July 1976 (age 50)
- Place of birth: Kinshasa, Zaire
- Position: Striker

Team information
- Current team: DR Congo Women (head coach)

Senior career*
| Years | Team | Apps | (Gls) |
| 1996–1997 | AC Sodigraf | - | (-) |
| 1998–1999 | AS Vita | - | (13) |
| 1999–2002 | SC Lokeren | 69 | (14) |
| 2002–2004 | Standard Liège | 18 | (2) |
| 2004–2005 | Sint-Truiden | 19 | (1) |
| 2005–2006 | Maccabi Netanya | 27 | (10) |
| 2006 | Maccabi Herzliya | 16 | (3) |
| 2007 | Hakoah Ramat Gan | 13 | (3) |
| 2007–2008 | Hapoel Petah Tikva | 32 | (7) |
| 2008 | RFC Liège | 16 | (6) |
| 2009–2010 | Atromitos Yeroskipou | 24 | (19) |
| 2010–2011 | APEP Pitsilia | 13 | (7) |
| 2011–2012 | RFC Liège | 26 | (21) |
| 2012–2013 | Royal Aywaille | 14 | (8) |

International career
| 1997–2006 | DR Congo | 28 | (4) |

Managerial career
- 2014: DR Congo (assistant manager)
- 2015: AS Dragons/Bilima
- 2017–2018: JS Kinshasa
- 2018–2021: FC Renaissance
- 2022–2023: Maniema Union
- 2023–: DR Congo Women
Medal record
Representing DR Congo
Men's football
Africa Cup of Nations
| Third place | 1998 Burkina Faso |
- * Club domestic league appearances and goals

Papy Okitankoyi Kimoto (born 22 July 1976) is a DR Congolese football manager and former professional player who played as a striker, most notably for the DR Congo national team and for SC Lokeren and Standard Liège in the Belgian First Division A. He is the current head coach of the DR Congo women's national team.

== Career ==
Born in Kinshasa, Kimoto moved to Belgium in 1999, where he played professional football with Sporting Lokeren, Standard Liège and Sint-Truidense V.V.

After he retired from playing, Kimoto became a football manager with a CAF "A" license. Kimoto managed AS Dragons/Bilima and Jeunesse Sportive (Kinshasa) before he was appointed to lead FC Renaissance du Congo in December 2018.

== Career statistics ==
=== International ===
Scores and results list DR Congo's goal tally first, score column indicates score after each Kimoto goal.

List of international goals scored by Papi Kimoto
| No. | Date | Venue | Opponent | Score | Result | Competition |
|---|---|---|---|---|---|---|
| 1 | 12 February 1998 | Stade Municipal, Ouagadougou, Burkina Faso | Tunisia | 1–1 | 1–2 | 1998 Africa Cup of Nations |
| 2 | 11 April 1999 | Stade des Martyrs, Kinshasa, DR Congo | Madagascar | 1–0 | 2–0 | 2000 Africa Cup of Nations qualification |
| 3 | 10 March 2001 | Stade des Martyrs, Kinshasa, DR Congo | Ivory Coast | 1–2 | 1–2 | 2002 FIFA World Cup qualification |
| 4 | 29 January 2002 | Stade Abdoulaye Makoro Cissoko, Kayes, Mali | Ivory Coast | 3–0 | 3–1 | 2002 Africa Cup of Nations |

== Honours ==
DR Congo

- African Cup of Nations: 3rd place, 1998
