= Patrick Etshimi =

Congolese footballer (born 1989)

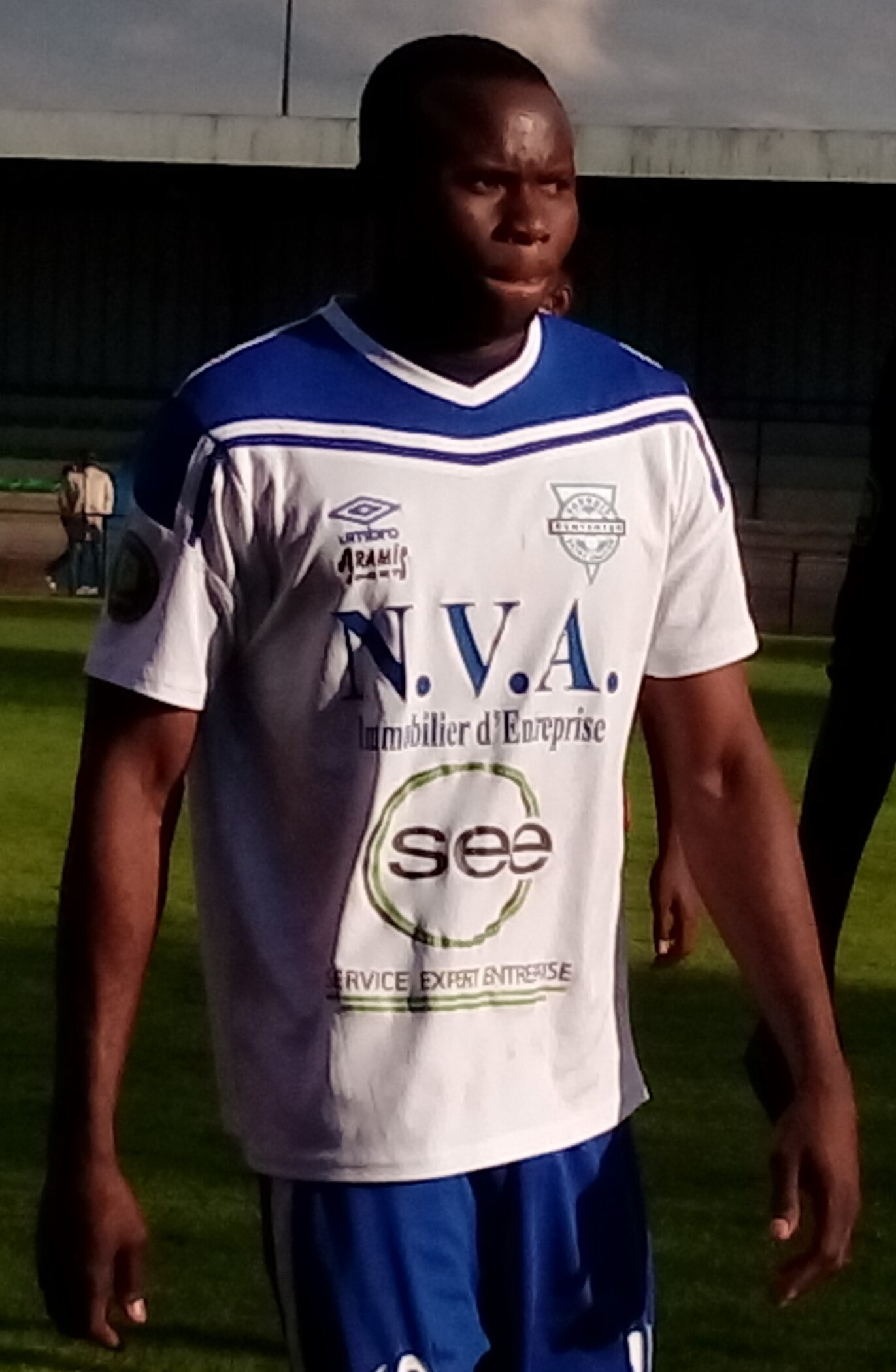
- Etshimi in 2017

Personal information
- Full name: Patrick Etshimi Kindenge
- Date of birth: 26 February 1989 (age 37)
- Place of birth: Kinshasa, Zaire
- Height: 1.84 m (6 ft 0 in)
- Position: Striker

Senior career*
Years	Team	Apps	(Gls)
2007–2010	FC MK Etanchéité		
2008	→ Dragons (loan)		
2009	→ Vita Club (loan)		
2010	→ Spartak Nalchik (loan)	5	(0)
2010–2012	Association Sportive de Fresnoy		
2012–2013	Roye-Noyon	32	(10)
2013–2014	Poissy	23	(15)
2014–2015	AC Amiens	10	(2)
2015	Ivry	17	(7)
2015–2017	L'Entente SSG	58	(35)
2017–2018	Paris FC	4	(1)
2018	Laval	3	(1)
2018–2019	Chambly	13	(3)
2019–2019	Progrès Niederkorn	12	(3)
2019–2020	Bastia	16	(6)
2020–2022	US Lusitanos Saint-Maur	22	(5)
2022–2023	Aubervilliers	22	(2)
- * Club domestic league appearances and goals

Patrick Etshimi Kindenge (born 26 February 1989), commonly known as Patrick Etshimi, is a Congolese former professional footballer.

== Career ==
Etshimi was under contract at FC MK Etanchéité. Before 2009 he played for AS Dragons, and in 2009 for Vita Club (probably, on loan). In August 2009, he was on trial with Charleroi in Belgium.

He made his Russian Premier League debut on 13 March 2010 for PFC Spartak Nalchik in a game against FC Anzhi Makhachkala. His loan was terminated during the 2010 summer transfer window.

In July 2017, Etshimi joined French club Paris FC on a contract that would run until 2018.

In July 2019, he signed with French club SC Bastia on a contract that would run until 2022.

In June 2020, Etshimi agreed a move to US Lusitanos Saint-Maur.

== Honours ==
Individual

- Championnat de France Amateur Golden Boot: 2016–17
