= Stade des Jeunes =

- Interactive map of Stade des Jeunes
- Location: (Democratic Republic of the Congo) Kananga, Congo DR
- Capacity: 10,000

Tenants
- US Tshinkunku and AS Saint-Luc

Stade des Jeunes is a stadium located in Kananga, Democratic Republic of the Congo. It has a seating capacity of 10,000 spectators. It serves as the home of US Tshinkunku and AS Saint-Luc of the Linafoot and Linafoot Ligue 2, respectively.
