= CS Imana =

Football club in the DR Congo

Cercle Sportif Imana, known as CS Imana for short, is a football club in Matadi, Democratic Republic of Congo. In the 2006/2007 season they played in the Linafoot, the top level of professional football in DR Congo.
