= Mwana (name) =

Mwana is an African given name and surname. Notable people with the name include:

- Mwana Kupona (died c. 1865), Swahili poet
- Pierre Mwana Kasongo (1938–1986), Congolese football player
