= UNIFFAC Clubs Cup =

The UNIFFAC Clubs Cup is an international club association football competition run by the Central African Football Federations' Union (French: Union des Fédérations de Football d'Afrique Centrale) known by its French acronym UNIFFAC, for clubs from Central African countries of Cameroon, Chad, Congo, DR Congo, Equatorial Guinea and Gabon.

== Winners ==
Season	Winner	Score	Runner-up
2004	Bamboutos FC (Cameroon)	1st leg: 1-2; 2nd leg: 2-1; Penalties: 6-5	FC 105 Libreville (Gabon)
2005	Téléstar FC (Gabon)	1st leg: 2-1; 2nd leg: 1-0	AS Police (Congo)
2006	SC Cilu (DR Congo)	1st leg: 3-1; 2nd leg: 0-0	Fovu Baham (Cameroon)
