= AS Veti Club =

- Full name: Association Sportive Veti Club
- Ground: Stade Lumumba; Matadi, DR Congo
- League: Linafoot
Home colours

AS Veti Club is a football club in Matadi, Democratic Republic of Congo. They play in the Linafoot, the top level of professional football in DR Congo.

== Honours ==
Coupe du Congo

- Runners-up (3): 2001, 2011, 2012

Ligue de Football Bas-Congo (LIFBACO)

- Winners (2): 1994, 2011
