= SCOM Mikishi =

- Full name: SCOM Mikishi
- Ground: Stade Kibassa Maliba, Lubumbashi
- Capacity: 35,000
- Chairman: ?
- Manager: ?
- League: Linafoot
- 2012: 8th
- Website: http://www.fclupopo.cd

SCOM Mikishi is a Congolese football club based in Lubumbashi.

The club have played many season in Linafoot and in 1991 the team has won the title.

== Stadium ==
Their home games are played at Stade Kibassa Maliba.

== Honours ==
Linafoot

- Winners (1): 1991

== Performance in CAF competitions ==
- African Cup of Champions Clubs/CAF Champions League: 1 appearance

1992 - First round
