= SC Cilu =

- Full name: Sporting Club Cilu de Lukala
- Nicknames: Les Cimentiers (Cement makers)
- Founded: 1939; 87 years ago
- Ground: Stade de la Lukala; Lukala, DR Congo
- League: Linafoot

Sporting Club Cilu is a football club in Lukala, Democratic Republic of Congo. They play in the Linafoot, the top level of professional football in DR Congo. They competed in the 2004 CAF Champions League, going out in the first round, and won the Unifac Clubs Cup in 2006

== Honours ==
- Linafoot
  - Runners-up (1): 2003
- Coupe du Congo
  - Winners (1): 2004
  - Runners-up (1): 2005
- Super Coupe du Congo
  - Winners (1): 2004
- Unifac Clubs Cup
  - Winners (1): 2006
- Ligue de Football Bas-Congo (LIFBACO)
  - Winners (10): 1983, 1984, 2001, 2002, 2003, 2004, 2005, 2006, 2007, 2008

== Performance in CAF competitions ==
- CAF Champions League:

2004 – Preliminary Round

- CAF Confederation Cup: 1 appearance

2005 – First Round
