= FC Renaissance du Congo =

FC Renaissance
- Full name: Football Club Renaissance du Congo
- Founded: 2014; 12 years ago
- Ground: Stade Tata Raphaël; Kinshasa, DR Congo
- Capacity: 50,000
- President: Pascal Mukuna
- Head Coach: Papi Kimoto
- League: Linafoot
- 2025–26: 10th in Group B

Football Club Renaissance du Congo or simply FC Renaissance is a Congolese football club based in Kinshasa. In the 2018-19 Linafoot season, FC Renaissance du Congo was the football club from Kinshasa with the second-highest average attendance. The average of AS Vita Club was 2,666, FC Renaissance du Congo drew an average attendance of 1,788 and the average of Daring Club Motema Pembe was 1,201.

== History ==
The club is founded in 2015.

== Honours ==
- Coupe du Congo
  - Winners (1): 2016
  - Runner-up (1): 2019
- DR Congo Super Cup
  - Runner-up (1): 2016
- Entente Provinciale de Football de Kinshasa (EPFKIN)
  - Winners (1): 2015–16

== Performance in CAF competitions ==
- CAF Confederation Cup: 1 appearance

2017 – First round (round of 32)
