= AS Simba =

- Full name: Association Sportive Simba Kolwezi
- Founded: 2002
- Ground: Stade Manika, Kolwezi
- Capacity: 1,500
- President: Noé Mupungila
- Manager: Julio César Gómez
- League: Ilicocash Ligue 1
- 2025–26: 7th
Home colours

AS Simba Kolwezi, better known as AS Simba, is a Congolese football club based in Kolwezi, Lualaba Province.

The most representative club of Lualaba, AS Simba is directly managed by the local government, which owns the financial and logistical activity of the team and fully covers the salary for the head coach.

== History ==
FC Simba Kolwezi was established in 2002 and is currently playing in Linafoot, the local top-tier league, since they won the 2018–19 season of the Linafoot Ligue 2 and won promotion to the top division of Congolese football for the first time in their history.

Although the 2019-20 edition of Linafoot was suspended in March 2020 and later halted due to the COVID-19 pandemic, AS Simba managed to stay for another year in the top-tier league as they finished twelfth out of sixteen teams, with their top-scorer Rodrigue Kitwa netting six goals.

For the following season, the local government decided to appoint Julio César Gómez as the club's new head coach. Mostly known for being the co-founder of the Ciudad Deportiva Getafe CF (training ground and academy base of the eponymous football team) and having previously worked as a talent scout for Real Madrid, the Spaniard was first introduced to Congolese football when he accepted to collaborate with a local scout in a project that was directly funded by the government, selecting young players from all over the country and leading the resulting representative to an international tournament in Dubai, which they eventually won. As a consequence, Gómez received (and refused) offers from several teams in Congo DR before accepting to take over the managerial role at AS Simba.

Introducing a more technical approach to the training methods and aspiring to improve the position of the club within Congolese football, Gómez led a successful pre-season, as AS Simba won every single one of their friendly matches. However, the team endured a slow start to the new season of Linafoot, going winless in their first six matches (only two of which were draws) and getting their first victory at the seventh round, beating JS Kinshasa 1–0. After fifteen games, AS Simba was placed 14th, having collected just 12 points.

== Stadium ==
AS Simba used to play their home games at the Stade Manika in Kolwezi, which could officially host 1,500 spectators. However, at the end of 2020 the club was set to complete their move to the newly built Dominique Diur Stadium (named for a local politician who served as governor of Lualaba Province from 1963 to 1966), which currently has an estimated capacity of 15,000.

=== Kit manufacturers and shirt sponsors ===
Period	Kit manufacturer	Shirt sponsor	Ref
2020-21	Adidas	Visit Lualaba	

== Committee ==
- Sporting director: Pierre Makandalele
