= AS Saint-Luc =

- Full name: Association Sportive Saint-Luc
- Founded: 1992
- Ground: Stade des Jeunes; Kananga, DR Congo
- Capacity: 10,000
- League: Linafoot Ligue 2

AS Saint-Luc is a football club in Kananga, Democratic Republic of Congo and currently playing in the Linafoot Ligue 2, the second level of the Congolese football.

== Ground ==
They play their home games at 10,000 capacity Stade des Jeunes in Kananga.

== Honours ==
- Coupe du Congo
  - Runner-up (1): 2000, 2004
- Kasaï-Occidental Provincial League
  - Winners (3): 2000, 2001, 2002

== Performance in CAF competitions ==
- CAF Cup Winners' Cup: 1 appearance

2001 – Second Round
