= AS Maniema Union =

- Full name: Association Sportive Maniema Union
- Nicknames: Verts et Noirs (Greens and Blacks)
- Founded: 2005
- Ground: Stade Joseph Kabila Kabange; Kindu, DR Congo
- Capacity: 10,000
- Chairman: Olivier Ilunga
- Manager: Mauril Njoya
- League: Linafoot
- 2025–26: Linafoot, 3rd of 12
Home colours	Away colours

Association Sportive Maniema Union is a Congolese football club based in Kindu, Maniema province and currently playing in the Linafoot, the top level of professional football in DR Congo.

== History ==
AS Maniema Union was founded in 2005 and they play at 10,000 capacity Stade Joseph Kabila Kabange.

Maniema competed in the CAF Confederation Cup in 2008, 2018 and 2019.

In February 2019, Les Verts et Noirs, appointed Guy Lusadisu as manager.

== Honours ==
- Coupe du Congo
  - Winners (3): 2007, 2017, 2019
- Maniema Provincial League
  - Winners (1): 2006

== Performance in CAF competitions ==
- CAF Champions League: 1 appearance:

2024–25 – Group Stage

- CAF Confederation Cup: 3 appearances

2008 – First Round
2018 – First Round
2019–20 – Preliminary Round
