= Merveille Kikasa =

Congolese footballer

Personal information
- Full name: Merveille Khader Kikasa Wamba
- Date of birth: 14 February 1999 (age 27)
- Position: Midfielder

Team information
- Current team: AS Vita Club
- Number: 33

Senior career*
Years	Team	Apps	(Gls)
2018	AC Léopards		
2018–2019	AS Otohô	7	(1)
2019–2023	AS Vita Club	24	(1)
2023–2025	1° de Agosto	4	(0)
2025–	AS Vita Club	1	(0)

International career^{‡}
2019–	DR Congo	5	(1)
- * Club domestic league appearances and goals ‡ National team caps and goals as of 9 August 2020

Merveille Kikasa (born 14 February 1999) is a Congolese football midfielder.

== International goals ==
Scores and results list DR Congo's goal tally first.

No.	Date	Venue	Opponent	Score	Result	Competition
1.	20 October 2019	Stade des Martyrs, Kinshasa, DR Congo	Central African Republic	2–0	4–1	2020 African Nations Championship qualification
