= Pierre Mwana Kasongo =

Congolese association football player

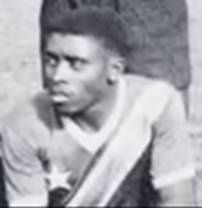

Personal information
- Full name: Pierre Kasongo Mwana Kasongo
- Date of birth: 10 October 1938
- Place of birth: Belgian Congo
- Date of death: 13 January 1986 (aged 47)
- Place of death: Lubumbashi, Zaire
- Position: Forward

Senior career*
Years	Team	Apps	(Gls)
1950–1960	Saint-Éloi Lupopo		
1960–1965	R.C.S. Verviétois		
1965–1967	Gent		
1967–1970	SC Imana		

International career
1968	DR Congo	5	(0)

Managerial career
- FC Daring
- St.Eloi Lupopo
- Rwenzori
- US Bilombe
- CS Makiso
- Englebert (former TP Mazembe)
- AS Nika
Medal record
Men's Football
Representing Congo-Kinshasa
Africa Cup of Nations
Winner	1968 Ethiopia
- * Club domestic league appearances and goals

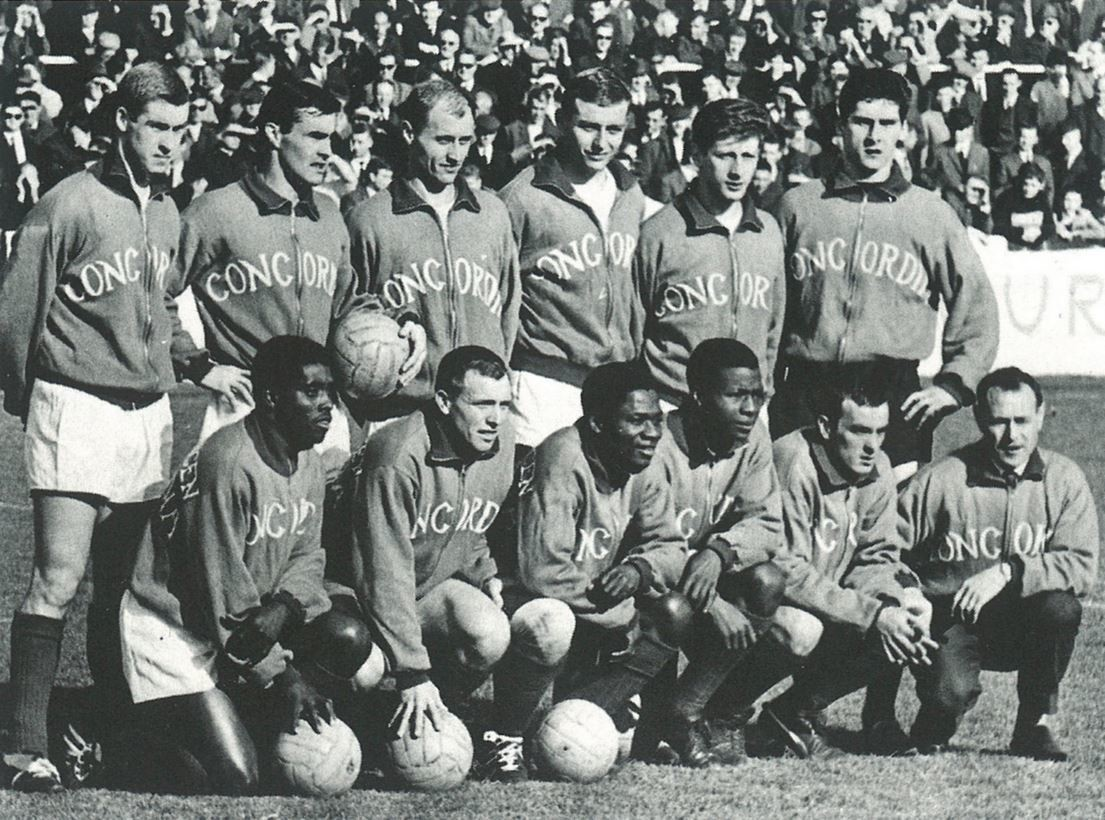
Pierre Mwana Kasongo bottom on the far left with K.A.A. Gent, 1965

Pierre Mwana Kasongo (also spelled Muana, 10 October 1938 – 13 January 1986) was a Congolese professional footballer who played for the national team ("Les Léopards"), managed other local teams and played for two Belgian teams. During his time in Belgium he played for Gantoise (1965–67) and Verviétois (1960–65).

== Honours ==
Congo-Kinshasa

- African Cup of Nations: 1968
