= FC MK Etanchéité =

FC MK Étanchéité
- Full name: Football Club MK Étanchéité
- Founded: 1995; 31 years ago
- Ground: Stade des Martyrs
- Capacity: 80,000
- League: Linafoot
- 2013–14: 4th, Group A

Football Club MK Étanchéité is a football club from DR Congo founded in 1995 in Kinshasa.

== Honours ==
Coupe du Congo

- Winners (2): 2013, 2014

== Performance in CAF competitions ==
- CAF Confederation Cup: 2 appearances

2014 – first round
2015 – first round of 16

== Notables players ==
- Chancel Mbemba
- Junior Kabananga
- Patrick Etshimi
