= Stade de l'Unité =

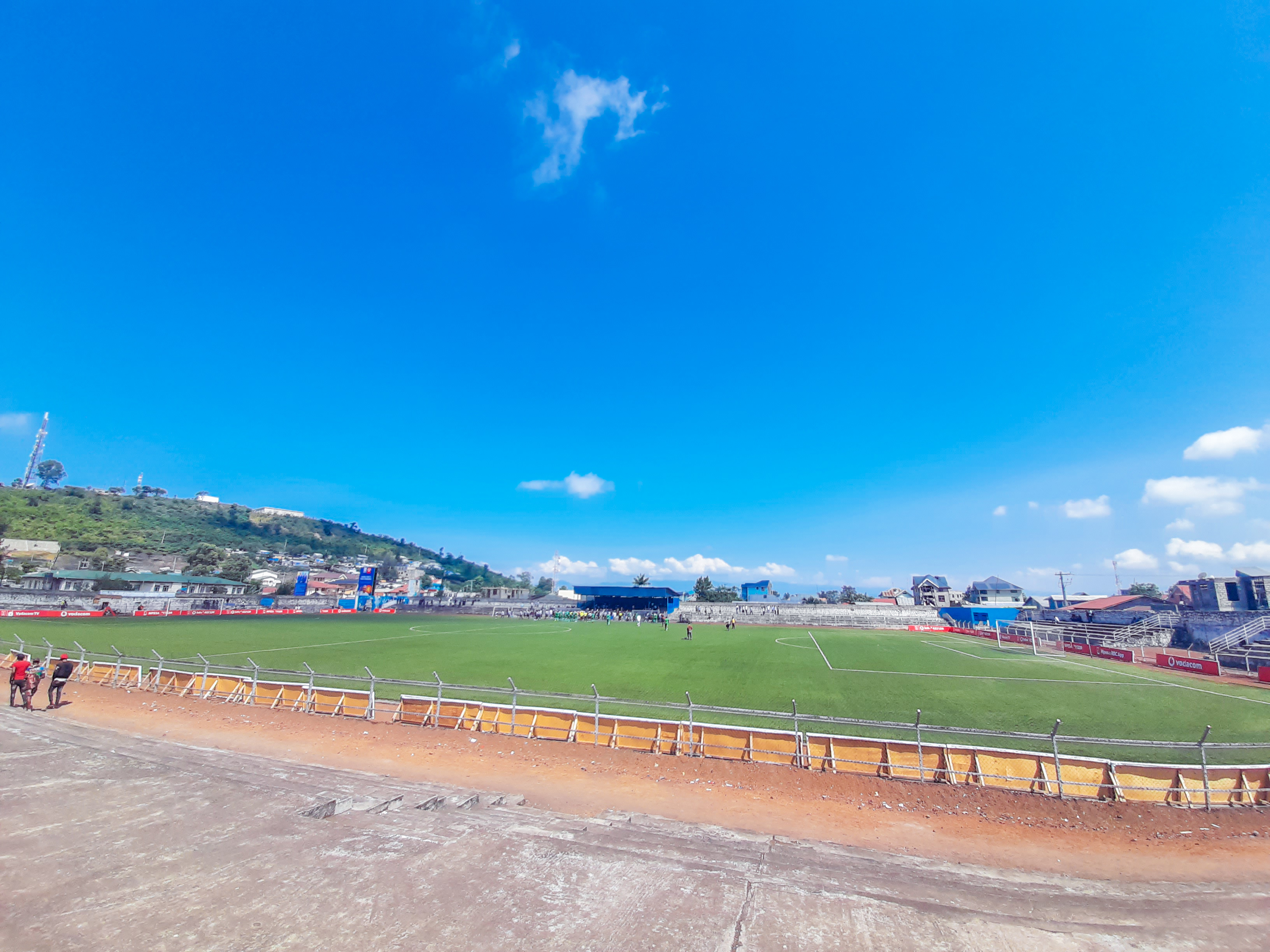
- Interactive map of Stade de l'Unité
- Full name: Stade de l'Unité
- Location: Goma, DR Congo
- Coordinates: 1°40′39.7″S 29°13′37.5″E
- Operator: Ministry of North Kivu
- Capacity: 10,000
- Surface: artificial grass

Construction
- Renovated: 2016-2018

Tenants
- AS Kabasha; DC Virunga; AS Dauphins Noirs

Stade de l'Unité is a multi-use stadium in Goma, Democratic Republic of the Congo. It is currently used mostly for football matches and serves as the home venue for AS Dauphins Noirs, DC Virunga and AS Kabasha.

The stadium was rehabilitated and reopened on May 6, 2018, with a match between AS Kabasha and DC Virunga.

== 2023 rocket accident ==
On September 28, 2023, a Congolese soldier in a vehicle on the outskirts of the stadium accidentally discharged an RPG–7 rocket launcher at the stadium, wounding eleven and killing one. At the time of the explosion young footballers were training on the pitch.

== See also ==
- List of football stadiums in the Democratic Republic of the Congo
- Lists of stadiums
