= Blessing FC =

- Full name: Blessing Football Club
- Founded: 2006
- Ground: Stade Manika; Kolwezi, DR Congo
- Capacity: 3,000
- Chairman: Hervé Kasendwe
- Manager: Cédric Kabuya
- League: Linafoot
- 2025-26: 8th

Blessing Football Club is a Congolese football club based in Kolwezi, Lualaba province and currently playing in the Linafoot, the first level of the Congolese football.
