= AS Bantous =

- Full name: Association Sportive Bantous
- Nickname: Tshikulu
- Founded: 1961
- Ground: Stade Kashala Bonzola; Mbuji-Mayi, DR Congo
- Capacity: 15,000
- League: Linafoot Ligue 2

Association Sportive Bantous is a Congolese football club based in Mbuji-Mayi, Kasai-Oriental province and currently playing in the Linafoot Ligue 2, the second level of the Congolese football.

== History ==
AS Bantous was founded in 1961 and they won the Linafoot, the most important football league in the Democratic Republic of the Congo, in 1995.

They were finalists in the Coupe du Congo in 1994, in which they were defeated by DC Motema Pembe. Internationally, they have participated in three continental tournaments, but have never passed the second round.

== Honours ==
- Linafoot
  - Winners (1): 1995
- Coupe du Congo
  - Runners-up (1): 1994

== Performance in CAF competitions ==
- African Cup of Champions Clubs / CAF Champions League: 1 appearances

1996 – First Round

- CAF Cup: 2 appearances

1994 – Second Round
1997 – Second Round
