= TP Molunge =

- Full name: Tout Puissant Molunge
- Ground: Stade Bakusu; Mbandaka, DR Congo
- Capacity: 1500
- League: Linafoot Ligue 2
- 2017–18: Zone de développement Ouest, 5th

Tout Puissant Molunge is a Congolese football club based in Mbandaka, Équateur province and currently playing in the Linafoot Ligue 2, the second level of the Congolese football. They play at 10,000 capacity Stade Bakusu.

== Honours ==
Equateur Provincial League

- Winners (5): 2002, 2005, 2006, 2008, 2010

== Performance in CAF competitions ==
- CAF Cup: 1 appearances

1993 – First Round
