= US Tshinkunku =

- Full name: Union Sportive Tshinkunku
- Founded: 1954 as Union St.-Gilloise
- Ground: Stade des Jeunes; Kananga, DR Congo
- Capacity: 10,000
- President: Jacques Ntambwe
- Manager: Pierre Tshiswaka
- League: Linafoot
- 2021–22: 17th
- Website: https://tshinkunku.com/

Union Sportive Tshinkunku commonly known as US Tshinkunku, is a Congolese football club based in Kananga, Kasaï-Central province, currently playing in the Linafoot, the first level of the Congolese football and their home games are played at Stade des Jeunes.

== History ==
The club was founded in 1954 as Union St-Gilloise.

US Tshinkunku had their first major success in 1985, when they won the National Championship Cup called Cup of Zaire (Coupe du Zaire) when Georges Mwanza Mande, alias Tshikem was the club president.

In 2011, Trésor Kapuku, then the governor of Kasai Occidental brought second title back to the province when he was the president of US Tshinkunku club.

In January 2014 the governor of then Kasai Occidental, Alex Kande Mupompa, was elected as the new club president, two years later, the club performed badly in the league and many fans were not happy with the management committee performance. Alexy Kayembe De Bampende, a long-time fan and a US based businessman who lives in Texas invited Georges Mwanza Tshikem to come to rebuild the team. Tshikem went to Kananga where he organized the team and the election for management committee.

On 4 December 2016, club fans and players elected Georges Mwanza Mande, alias Tshikem as club president and Alexy Kayembe De Bampende was elected vice president of Union Sportive Tshinkunku.

Tshikem-Kayembe's vision is to make Tshinkunku a competitive club in national and international level. So far they managed to recruit Congolese qualified coaches to manage the team, Eric Tshibasu, the under-20 DR Congo national team, was hired as a team coach, but was fired three months later. Kayembe approached Jean-Claude Mukanya, the former DR Congo national football team captain to become US Tshinkunku manager. Mukanya signed a three-year contract in Kinshasa on 3 July 2017 in front of hundreds of Kinshasa-based US Tshinkunku fans.

...

== Honours ==
Linafoot

- Winners (1): 1985

Coupe du Congo

- Winners (1): 2011

Kasaï-Occidental Provincial League

- Winners (2): 2006, 2007

== Performance in CAF competitions ==
- African Cup of Champions Clubs: 1 appearance

1986 – First round

- CAF Confederation Cup: 1 appearance

2012 – First round
