= Académic Club Rangers =

Football club in Kinshasa, Congo

AC Rangers
- Full name: Académic Club Rangers
- Nicknames: Rangers, Les Académiciens
- Founded: 2000
- Ground: Stade des Martyrs, Congo DR
- Capacity: 80,000
- President: Aymeric Mukalenga
- Manager: Lambert Ossango
- League: Linafoot
- 2025–26: 7th, Group B

Académic Club Rangers is a Congolese football club based in Kinshasa. They play their home games at the 80,000 capacity Stade des Martyrs in Kinshasa.

== History ==
Académic Club Rangers was established in 2000 and is currently playing in Linafoot.
