= FC Saint-Éloi Lupopo =

Association football club in DR Congo

Saint-Éloi Lupopo
- Full name: Football Club Saint-Éloi Lupopo
- Nickname: Les Cheminots (The Railmen)
- Founded: 1939; 87 years ago
- Ground: Stade Frederic Kibassa Maliba
- Capacity: 20,000
- Chairman: Jacques Kyabula Katwe
- Manager: Christian Bracconi
- League: Linafoot
- 2025–26: Linafoot, 5th of 20
- Website: fc-lupopo.com
Home colours	Away colours

Football Club Saint-Éloi Lupopo is a Congolese professional football club based in Lubumbashi. Their home games are played at Stade Kibassa Maliba. FC Saint-Éloi Lupopo drew an average home attendance of 4,369 in the 2018-19 Linafoot season.

== Honours ==
- Linafoot
  - Winners (6): 1958, 1968, 1981, 1986, 1990, 2002
  - Runner-up (3): 2005, 2006, 2009, 2025
- Coupe du Congo
  - Winners (3): 1961, 1968, 2015
  - Runner-up (3): 2007, 2014, 2017
- SuperCoupe du Congo
  - Winners (1): 2002
  - Runner-up (1): 2015
- Katanga Provincial League (LIFKAT)
  - Winners (5): 1946, 1950, 2001, 2003, 2008
- EUFLU (Lubumbashi)
  - Winners (6): 1956, 1957, 1958, 1959, 2002, 2009

== Performance in CAF competitions ==
- CAF Champions League: 4 appearances

2003 – Second Round
2006 – Second Round
2007 – Preliminary Round
2010 – First Round

- African Cup of Champions Clubs: 4 appearances

1969 – Quarter-Finals
1982 – Semi-Finals
1987 – Second Round
1991 – First Round

- CAF Confederation Cup: 5 appearances

2005 – First Round of 16
2006 – Group Stage
2011 – First Round of 16
2012 – First Round
2016 – First Round

- CAF Super Cup: 0 appearances

== Incidents at Matches ==
During a match with TP Mazembe in 2011, 14 people were killed during a stampede after spectators invaded the pitch as TP Mazembe equalized the score.

Most famous player: Pierre Mwana Kasongo who also played for Daring Faucons (Motema Pembe), was the first African player to become the top scorer in Belgium as he played for CS vervietois in 1962–63. He also played for ARA La Gantoise in Belgium. Mwana Kasongo successfully managed St Eloi Lupopo, TP Mazembe, Ruwenzori Natioanal, Makiso, Nika, Bilombe, and Sanga Balende, as well as the Leopards du Zaire. He was the first Congolese to be qualified as a Manager from the Académie Française de Football in France. He died on 13 January 1986 as he was managing St Eloi Lupopo.
