= TP Mazembe =

Association football club in DR Congo

- Full name: Tout Puissant Mazembe
- Nicknames: Les Corbeaux (The Ravens); Les Badiangwena (The Crocodile Eaters); The Baba Boys
- Founded: 28 November 1939; 86 years ago as FC Saint-Georges
- Ground: Stade TP Mazembe
- Capacity: 18,500
- Chairman: Moïse Katumbi Chapwe
- Manager: Slimane Rahou
- League: Linafoot
- 2025–26: Champions
- Website: http://www.tpmazembe.com
colours	colours

Tout Puissant Mazembe, commonly referred to as TP Mazembe, is a Congolese professional football club based in Lubumbashi. They were the first African and the first outside of Europe and South America to play in a Club World Cup final, losing 3-0 against Inter Milan in the 2010 FIFA Club World Cup edition, finishing runners-up.

== History ==
Tout Puissant Mazembe, the first sports club from the Democratic Republic of the Congo with a value of at least $10 million, was originally founded by the Benedictine monks who directed the Institut Saint-Boniface school in Élisabethville (modern-day Lubumbashi) in Katanga Province. The missionaries originally decided in 1939 to established a football team for the students' Boy Scout troop, named Saint Georges FC, after the patron saint of the Scouting movement. This team affiliated itself directly in the first division of the Royal Federation of the Native Athletic Associations (Fédération Royale des Associations Sportives Indigènes, FRASI) founded by the Belgian King. At the end of the season, Holy Georges placed 3rd.

In 1944 the young scouts went on the road and FC St. Georges was rechristened Saint Paul F.C. Some years later, the incorporation of certain foreign elements in the Institute would make the missionaries abandon the team management. The team took the name of F.C. Englebert after its sponsor, a tire brand. The qualifier "Tout Puissant" (Almighty) was added to the club's name after it went undefeated in winning its first league title in 1966.

After the country's independence on 30 June 1960, Englebert restructured itself. In 1966, the team won a treble (national Championship, Coupe du Congo and Katanga Cup).

In 1967 and 1968, they won the African Cup of Champions. The team would be finalist four consecutive times from 1967 to 1970. Mazembe was the first team to successfully defend the African Champions Cup. This feat was finally repeated in 2003 and 2004 by Enyimba.

After 18 years of absence, it returned to the African scene thanks to 38-year-old governor Moïse Katumbi Chapwe, who owned the club.

In November 2009, the team won the CAF Champions League, the African championship for football clubs. Mazembe won against Heartland 2–2 on aggregate, winning on the away goals rule.

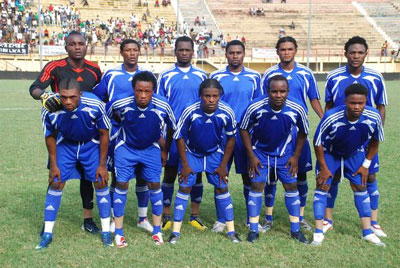
TP Mazembe in 2009

By winning the CAF Champions League, Mazembe qualified for the 2009 FIFA Club World Cup. In their first world championship match in the quarter-finals, they lost 2–1 to the Pohang Steelers from South Korea, despite taking the lead in the first half. Following a 3–2 defeat to Auckland City in the fifth place match, they finished the tournament in 6th place.

In 2010 they retained the 2010 CAF Champions League, and in December they became the first African side (and the first outside Europe and South America) to contest the final of the FIFA Club World Cup after defeating both Pachuca of Mexico 1–0 in the quarter-finals and Internacional of Brazil 2–0 in the semi-finals. In the final on 18 December, they were defeated 3–0 by Internazionale.

In 2015, TP Mazembe secured their fifth title in the competition after defeating USM Alger of Algeria 4–1 aggregate in the 2015 CAF Champions League final.

Mazembe became the first club from DR Congo with 900,000 followers on Facebook in 2025 and the club reached 1 million Facebook followers in 2026.

== Women's football ==
In 2020, a women's section of TP Mazembe was formed.

== Crest and colours ==
=== Kit manufacturers and shirt sponsors ===
Period	Kit manufacturer	Shirt sponsor	Ref
2008-09	Adidas	MCK Trucks	
2009-10	Adidas	Brasimba	
2010-16	Adidas	MCK Trucks	
2016-19	Adidas	Brasimba	
2019-20	Sogam	-	
2020-21	Sogam	Brasimba	
2021-22	?	?	
2022-23	Sogam	MCK Trucks	
2023-24	Sogam	MCK Trucks	
2024-25	Sogam	Brasimba	
2025-26	Sogam	Brasimba	

== Honours ==
With 28 titles at national level and 11 at international level since 1966, TP Mazembe is currently the most successful club of the DRC with 39 titles.

=== Domestic ===
- Linafoot
  - Champions (21): 1966, 1967, 1969, 1976, 1987, 2000, 2001, 2006, 2007, 2009, 2011, 2012, 2013, 2013–14, 2015–16, 2016–17, 2018–19, 2019–20, 2021–22, 2023–24, 2025–26,
- Congo Cup
  - Champions (5): 1966, 1967, 1976, 1979, 2000
- DR Congo Super Cup
  - Champions (3): 2013, 2014, 2016 (Record)

=== Continental ===
- African Cup of Champions Clubs / CAF Champions League
  - Champions (5): 1967, 1968, 2009, 2010, 2015
- African Cup Winners' Cup
  - Champions (1): 1980
- CAF Confederation Cup
  - Champions (2): 2016, 2017
- CAF Super Cup
  - Champions (3): 2010, 2011, 2016

=== Global ===
- FIFA Club World Cup
  - Runners-up (1): 2010

=== Regional ===
- LIFKAT (Katanga Province)
  - Champions (6): 1966, 2006, 2007, 2009, 2010, 2011
- EUFLU (Lubumbashi)
  - Champions (19): 1947, 1965, 1966, 1968, 1971, 1973, 1975, 1976, 1977, 1978, 1986, 1988, 1994, 1995, 1997, 1999, 2000, 2003, 2004, 2011

== Performance in CAF competitions ==
- African Cup of Champions Clubs / CAF Champions League: 25 appearances

The club have 7 appearances in African Cup of Champions Clubs from 1967 to 1988 and 18 appearances in CAF Champions League from 2001 till now, having appeared in every edition since 2007.

1967 – Champion
1968 – Champion
1969 – Finalist
1970 – Finalist
1972 – Semi-finals
1977 – First Round
1988 – First Round
2001 – Group Stage
2002 – Semi-finals
2005 – Preliminary Round
2007 – Second Round
2008 – Group Stage
2009 – Champion
2010 – Champion
2011 – Disqualified in Second Round
2012 – Semi-finals
2013 – Second Round
2014 – Semi-finals
2015 – Champions
2016 – Second Round
2017 – First Round
2018 – Quarter-finals
2018–19 – Semi-finals
2019–20 – Quarter-finals
2020–21 – Group Stage

- CAF Cup / CAF Confederation Cup: 7 appearances

The club have 1 appearance in CAF Cup in 2000 and 6 appearances in CAF Confederation Cup from 2004 till now.

2000 – Second Round
2004 – First Round
2006 – disqualified in First Round
2007 – Group Stage
2013 – Finalist
2016 – Champion
2017 – Champion

- CAF Cup Winners' Cup: 2 appearances

1980 – Champion
1981 – Second Round

- CAF Super Cup: 5 appearances

2010 – Champion
2011 – Champion
2016 – Champion
2017 – Finalist
2018 – Finalist

== Current squad ==
As of 22 August 2024

Note: Flags indicate national team as defined under FIFA eligibility rules; some limited exceptions apply. Players may hold more than one non-FIFA nationality.

No.	Pos.	Nation	Player
33	GK	SEN	Alioune Badara Faty (Birth: May 3, 1999)
—	GK	COD	Ikie Utshudi (Birth: March 12, 2005)
22	GK	SEN	Marc Diouf (Birth: November 20, 1998)
35	DF	COD	Dieu Bénit Ndongala (Birth: January 6, 2003)
5	DF	COD	Josué Mwimba Isala (Birth: January 26, 2003)
6	DF	COD	Othniel Mawawu
14	FW	COD	Bingi Belo
10	FW	CGO	Wilfrid Nkaya
11	MF	COD	Merceil Ngimbi
12	DF	COD	Elie Madinda
15	FW	NIG	Boubacar Haïnikoye
23	DF	NIG	Adamou Ibrahim Djibo (August 13, 1998)
—	MF	COD	Merveille Kikasa (February 14, 1999)
4	DF	COD	Johnson Atibu (Birth: June 18, 1997)
21	GK	COD	Baggio Siadi
22	GK	NGR	Suleman Shaibu

No.	Pos.	Nation	Player
23	DF	SEN	Mor Mbaye
24	MF	COD	Sozé Zemanga
26	FW	COD	Étienne Mayombo
27	FW	COD	Gloire Mujaya
29	DF	COD	Ernest Luzolo
30	MF	COD	Serge Mukoko
31	DF	COD	Magloire Ntambwe
32	MF	COD	Josué Mungwengi
17	DF	CHA	Goni Ali (Birth: September 22, 2001)
34	FW	COD	John Bakata
35	FW	MLI	Cheick Fofana
37	MF	COD	Patient Mwamba
39	FW	MLI	Fily Traore
—	MF	COD	Christopher Ngolo Samangua (Birth: July 24, 2000)
—	FW	COD	Obed Mukokiani
23	FW	COD	Meschack Tshimanga (Birth: December 19, 2005)

== Notable former players ==
Topscorer	Linafoot	Congo Cup	CAF Competition	Total
(Democratic Republic of the Congo) Tresor Mputu	165	0	41	206

For details on former players see Category:TP Mazembe players.

== See also ==
- List of world champion football clubs and vice-world champions in football
