= Linafoot =

Football league in the Democratic Republic of the Congo

- Founded: 1958 (as Coupe du Congo); 1990 (as Linafoot)
- Country: DR Congo
- Confederation: CAF (Africa)
- Number of clubs: 25
- Level on pyramid: 1
- Relegation to: Linafoot Ligue 2
- Domestic cup: Coupe du Congo
- International cup(s): CAF Champions League; CAF Confederation Cup
- Current champions: TP Mazembe (2025–26)
- Most championships: TP Mazembe (21 titles)
- Top scorer: Tresor Mputu (165 goals)
- Website: linafoot.com
- Current: 2025-26 Linafoot

The Linafoot is the top division of the Congolese Association Football Federation (FECOFA), the governing body of football in the Democratic Republic of the Congo. It was created in 1958.

In 2010 the competition was renamed the Vodacom Super League following the signing of a five-year sponsorship deal with communications company Vodacom. The 2012 championship was the first in the country's history played in a long-season championship of 14 teams who were removed from their regional leagues for the first time. Prior to that, all regional champions were qualified to the national stage for the winner to be determined.

In 2013, the highest Linafoot attendance was set in a match between AS Vita Club and DC Motema Pembe, which saw an attendance of 80,000 at the Stade des Martyrs. In 2025, the derby took place at the Stade Tata Raphaël in front of a crowd of 40,000.

As of 2025, TP Mazembe is the most successful Linafoot club with 20 titles, followed by AS Vita Club with 15 titles and DC Motema Pembe with 12 titles.

== Name history ==
DR Congo's top division has been played either as knockout competition via the Coupe du Congo (DR Congo) or as in groups and a league. It was first named as LINAFOOT (Ligue Nationale de Football) in 1990.

- 1958-1971: Coupe du Congo
- 1972-1989: Coupe du Zaïre
- 1990-1991: Linafoot
- 1992-1997: Coupe du Zaïre
- 1998-present: Linafoot

== Qualification for African competitions ==
=== Association ranking for the 2025–26 CAF club season ===
The association ranking for the 2025–26 CAF Champions League and the 2025–26 CAF Confederation Cup will be based on results from each CAF club competition from 2020–21 to the 2024–25 season.

Legend

- CL: CAF Champions League
- CC: CAF Confederation Cup
- ≥: Associations points might increase on basis of its clubs performance in 2024–25 CAF club competitions
- Associations ranked 1–12 are eligible to enter two teams in each CAF club competition.

Rank			Association	2020–21 (× 1)		2021–22 (× 2)		2022–23 (× 3)		2023–24 (× 4)		2024–25 (× 5)		Total
2025	2024	Mvt	Association	CL	CC	CL	CC	CL	CC	CL	CC	CL	CC	Total
1	1	—	Egypt	8	3	7	4	8	2.5	7	7	10	4	190.5
2	2	—	Morocco	4	6	9	5	8	2	2	4	5	5	142
3	4	+1	South Africa	8	2	5	4	4	3	4	1.5	9	3	131
4	3	-1	Algeria	6	5	7	1	6	5	2	3	5	5	130
5	6	+1	Tanzania	3	0.5	0	2	3	4	6	0	2	4	82.5
6	5	-1	Tunisia	4	3	5	1	4	2	6	1	3	0.5	82.5
7	8	+1	Angola	1	0	5	0	2	0	3	1.5	2	2	55
8	7	-1	DR Congo	4	0	0	3	1	2	4	0	2	0	45
9	9	—	Sudan	3	0	3	0	3	0	2	0	3	0	41
10	11	+1	Ivory Coast	0	0	0	1	0	3	3	0	1	2	38
11	10	-1	Libya	0	0.5	0	5	0	0.5	0	3	0	0	24
12	12	—	Nigeria	0	2	0	0	0	2	0	2	0	1	21

== Current clubs ==
Teams within the league are divided into two groups which face each other twice throughout the regular season. The top four teams of each group at the end of the regular season qualify for the championship round, which consists of another set of home and away matches for each team. The top two finishers qualify for the CAF Champions League and the third the CAF Confederation Cup.

Locations of teams in the 2025–26 Linafoot

Group A
Team	Location	Stadium
TP Mazembe	Lubumbashi	Stade TP Mazembe
FC Saint-Éloi Lupopo	Lubumbashi	Stade Omnisports Frédéric-Kibasa-Maliba
CS Don Bosco	Lubumbashi	Stade TP Mazembe
AS Simba	Kolwezi	Stade Frederic Kibassa Maliba
CS Manika	Kolwezi	Stade Dominique Diur
FC Tanganyika	Kalemie	Stade Frederic Kibassa Maliba
FC Lubumbashi Sport	Lubumbashi	Stade Frederic Kibassa Maliba
Blessing FC	Kolwezi	Stade Dominique Diur
SM Sanga Balende	Mbuji-Mayi	Stade des Martyrs
AS Saint-Luc	—	—
AS Malole	Kananga	Stade des Jeunes de Katoka
AS New Soger	Lubumbashi	Stade Frederic Kibassa Maliba
US Tshinkunku	Kananga	Stade des Jeunes de Katoka
JS Groupe Bazano	Lubumbashi	Stade Frederic Kibassa Maliba
FC Tshikas	—	—
US Panda B52	Likasi	Stade Kikula

Group B
Team	Location	Stadium
AS Maniema Union	Kindu	Stade Joseph Kabila Kabange
FC Les Aigles du Congo	Kinshasa	Stade des Martyrs
AS Vita Club	Kinshasa	Stade des Martyrs
Céleste FC	Kinshasa	Stade des Martyrs
AS Dauphin Noir	Goma	Stade Joseph Kabila Kabange
AF Anges Verts	Kinshasa	Stade des Martyrs
AC Rangers	Kinshasa	Stade des Martyrs
FC Étoile du Kivu	Bukavu	Stade Joseph Kabila Kabange
New JAK FC	Kinshasa	Stade Tata Raphaël
FC Renaissance du Congo	Kinshasa	Stade des Martyrs
OC Renaissance du Congo	Kinshasa	Stade des Martyrs
OC Bukavu-Dawa	Bukavu	Stade Tata Raphaël
DC Motema Pembe Imana	Kinshasa	Stade des Martyrs
FC MK	Kinshasa	Stade Tata Raphaël
AS Martin Pêcheur	Isiro	—

== Champions ==
Coupe du Congo

Years	Champions
1958	FC Saint Eloi Lupopo (1)
1959	Not finished
1960	Not held
1961	Not held
1962	Not held
1963	DC Motema Pembe (1)
1964	DC Motema Pembe (2)
1965	AS Dragons (1)
1966	TP Mazembe (1)
1967	TP Mazembe (2)
1968	FC Saint Eloi Lupopo (2)
1969	TP Mazembe (3)
1970	AS Vita Club (1)
1971	AS Vita Club (2)
1973	AS Vita Club (3)
1973	AS Vita Club (4)
1974	DC Motema Pembe (3)
1975	AS Vita Club (5)
1976	TP Mazembe (4)
1977	AS Vita Club (6)
1978	DC Motema Pembe (4)
1979	AS Dragons (2)
1980	AS Vita Club (7)
1981	FC Saint Eloi Lupopo (3)
1982	AS Dragons (3)
1983	SM Sanga Balende (1)
1984	AS Dragons (4)
1985	US Tshinkunku (1)
1986	FC Saint Eloi Lupopo (4)
1987	TP Mazembe (5)
1988	AS Vita Club (8)
1989	DC Motema Pembe (5)

Linafoot

Years	Champions
1990	FC Saint Eloi Lupopo (5)
1991	SCOM Mikishi (1)

Coupe du Zaïre

Years	Champions
1992	US Bilombe (1)
1993	AS Vita Club (9)
1994	DC Motema Pembe (6)
1995	AS Bantous (1)
1996	DC Motema Pembe (7)
1997	AS Vita Club (10)

Linafoot

Years	Champions
1998	DC Motema Pembe (8)
1999	DC Motema Pembe (9)
2000	TP Mazembe (6)
2001	TP Mazembe (7)
2002	FC Saint Eloi Lupopo (6)
2003	AS Vita Club (11)
2004	DC Motema Pembe (10)
2005	DC Motema Pembe (11)
2006	TP Mazembe (8)
2007	TP Mazembe (9)
2008	DC Motema Pembe (12)
2009	TP Mazembe (10)
2010	AS Vita Club (12)
2011	TP Mazembe (11)
2012	TP Mazembe (12)
2013	TP Mazembe (13)
2013–14	TP Mazembe (14)
2014–15	AS Vita Club (13)
2015–16	TP Mazembe (15)
2016–17	TP Mazembe (16)
2017–18	AS Vita Club (14)
2018–19	TP Mazembe (17)
2019–20	TP Mazembe (18)
2020–21	AS Vita Club (15)
2021–22	TP Mazembe (19)
2022–23	Championship canceled
2023–24	TP Mazembe (20)
2024–25	Aigles du Congo (1)
2025–26	TP Mazembe (21)

== Performance by club ==
=== Linafoot (1990-91 and 1998-present) ===
	Club	City	Titles	Years
1	TP Mazembe	Lubumbashi	21	2000, 2001, 2006, 2007, 2009, 2011, 2012, 2013, 2014, 2016, 2017, 2019, 2020, 2022, 2024,2026
2	DC Motema Pembe	Kinshasa	5	1994, 1998, 1999, 2004, 2005, 2008
2	AS Vita Club	Kinshasa	5	2003, 2010, 2015, 2018, 2021
4	FC Saint Eloi Lupopo	Lubumbashi	2	1990, 2002
5	SCOM Mikishi	Lubumbashi	1	1991
5	Aigles du Congo	Kinshasa	1	2025

=== Coupe du Congo/Zaire and Linafoot ===
	Club	City	Titles	Years
1	TP Mazembe (Includes TP Engelbert)	Lubumbashi	21	1966, 1967, 1969, 1976, 1987, 2000, 2001, 2006, 2007, 2009, 2011, 2012, 2013, 2014, 2016, 2017, 2019, 2020, 2022, 2024, 2025-26
2	AS Vita Club	Kinshasa	15	1970, 1971, 1972, 1973, 1975, 1977, 1980, 1988, 1993, 1997, 2003, 2010, 2015, 2018, 2021
3	DC Motema Pembe (Includes CS Imana)	Kinshasa	12	1963, 1964, 1974, 1978, 1989, 1994, 1996, 1998, 1999, 2004, 2005, 2008
4	FC Saint Eloi Lupopo	Lubumbashi	6	1958, 1968, 1981, 1986, 1990, 2002
5	AS Dragons (Includes AS Bilima)	Kinshasa	4	1965, 1979, 1982, 1984
6	SM Sanga Balende	Mbuji-Mayi	1	1983
6	US Tshinkunku	Kananga	1	1985
6	SCOM Mikishi	Lubumbashi	1	1991
6	US Bilombe	Bukavu	1	1992
6	AS Bantous	Mbuji-Mayi	1	1995
6	Aigles du Congo	Kinshasa	1	2025

== Players ==
=== Top goalscorers ===
Season	Country	Player	Club	Goals
2000	(Democratic Republic of the Congo)	Papy Bazilepo	Kinshasa City FC	19
2003	(Democratic Republic of the Congo)	Belingo Brazzo	AS Vita Club	8
2004	(Democratic Republic of the Congo)	Tresor Mputu	TP Mazembe	34
2005	(Democratic Republic of the Congo)	Tresor Mputu	TP Mazembe	22
2006	(Democratic Republic of the Congo)	Tresor Mputu	TP Mazembe	15
2007	(Democratic Republic of the Congo)	Tresor Mputu	TP Mazembe	15
2008	(Democratic Republic of the Congo)	Serge Lofo Bongeli	AS Vita Club	16
2009	(Democratic Republic of the Congo)	Junior Kabananga	FC MK Etanchéité	27
2012	(Tanzania)	Mbwana Samatta	TP Mazembe	23
2013	(Democratic Republic of the Congo)	Tady Agiti Etkiama	AS Vita Club	13
2013–14	(Tanzania)	Mbwana Samatta	TP Mazembe	15
2014–15	(Ivory Coast)	Roger Assale	TP Mazembe	14
2015–16	(Democratic Republic of the Congo)	Chavda Maïsha	Sharks XI	12
2016–17	(Democratic Republic of the Congo)	Ben Malango	TP Mazembe	18
2017–18	(Democratic Republic of the Congo)	Jean Marc Makusu	AS Vita Club	24
2018–19	(Democratic Republic of the Congo)	Jackson Muleka	TP Mazembe	24
2019–20	(Democratic Republic of the Congo)	Jackson Muleka	TP Mazembe	12
2021–22	(Democratic Republic of the Congo)	Makabi Lilepo	AS Vita Club	9
2023–24	(Mali)	Fily Traore	TP Mazembe	19
2024–25	(Democratic Republic of the Congo)	Horso Mwaku	FC Saint-Éloi Lupopo	14

=== All-time appearances ===
Rank	Player	Matches
1	(Democratic Republic of the Congo) Robert Kidiaba	681
2	(Cameroon) Nelson Lukong	487
3	**(Democratic Republic of the Congo) Djos Issama**	453
4	(Democratic Republic of the Congo) Tresor Mputu	360
5	(Democratic Republic of the Congo) Eric Nkulukuta	275
6	(Democratic Republic of the Congo) Patou Kabangu	269
7	(Democratic Republic of the Congo) Ley Matampi	263
8	(Ivory Coast) Christian Koffi	263
9	(Zambia) Kabaso Chongo	248
10	(Democratic Republic of the Congo) Pierre Ndaye	245
11	(Democratic Republic of the Congo) Belnadiw Bazola Pandev	243
In bold players still active.

== Records and statistics ==
- Trésor Mputu holds the record for most goals scored in history of Linafoot with 165 goals.
- Trésor Mputu has won the top scorer award five times. He is the only player to have won it four times in a row.
- Junior Kabananga hold the record for most goals scored in a season with 27 goals.
- Cameroonian Nelson Lukong, with 487 matches, is the foreign player who has played the most matches in the history of Ligue 1 as of June 02, 2022.
- Jackson Muleka, in the 2019-2020 season, scored the fastest goal in the history of the Championship after only 15 seconds with TP Mazembe.

== See also ==
- Coupe du Congo
- DR Congo Super Cup
- Linafoot Ligue 2
