= AS Vita Club =

Association football club in DR Congo

AS Vita
- Full name: Association Sportive Vita Club
- Nicknames: Les Dauphins Noirs (The Black Dolphins); V.Club
- Founded: 1 January 1935; 91 years ago
- Ground: Stade Tata Raphaël
- Capacity: 60,000
- President: Flory Mapamboli
- Manager: Pascal Grosbois
- League: Linafoot
- 2025–26: Linafoot, 4th of 20
Home colours	Away colours

Association Sportive Vita Club, more commonly known as AS Vita Club, AS V. Club or simply Vita Club, is a Congolese professional football club based in Kinshasa.

== History ==
AS Vita Club was founded in 1935 by Honoré Essabe under the name of Renaissance in rue Usoke n° 73 in Kinshasa.

The name changed in 1939 into Diables Rouges, in 1942 into Victoria Club and finally in 1971 to Vita Club. On 17 December 1976 it took the official statue of the omnisports club with many sections:

- Football
- Basketball
- Handball
- Nantei
- Volleyball

== Honours ==
AS Vita Club is one of the most successful teams of the DR Congo, having won many national and international titles.

=== National ===
- Linafoot
  - Champions (15): 1970, 1971, 1972, 1973, 1975, 1977, 1980, 1988, 1993, 1997, 2003, 2010, 2014–15, 2017–18, 2020–21
- Coupe du Congo
  - Champions (10): 1971, 1972, 1973, 1975, 1977, 1981, 1982, 1983, 2001, 2024
- Super Coupe du Congo
  - Champions: 2015
- Challenge Papa Kalala Cup
  - Champions (2): 1982, 1983

=== International ===
- African Cup of Champions Clubs / CAF Champions League
  - Champions: 1973

=== Regional ===
- EPFKIN (Kinshasa)
  - Champions (33): 1937, 1938, 1940, 1942, 1946, 1947, 1950, 1953, 1954, 1957, 1958, 1965, 1967, 1969, 1970, 1971, 1974, 1976, 1979, 1984, 1987, 1992, 1993, 1996, 1997, 1998, 2001, 2002, 2004, 2005, 2009, 2010, 2011
- Super Coupe de Kinshasa
  - Champions (3): 2002, 2005, 2006

== Performance in CAF competitions ==
- African Cup of Champions Clubs / CAF Champions League: 14 appearances

The club have 8 appearances in African Cup of Champions Clubs from 1971 to 1995 and 6 appearances in CAF Champions League from 1998 till now.

1971 – Second Round
1973 – Champion
1974 – Second Round
1975 – Second Round
1978 – Semi-Finals

1981 – Finalist
1989 – Second Round
1995 – First Round
1998 – First Round
2004 – Second Round

2011 – First Round
2012 – First Round
2013 – First Round
2014 – Runners-up

- CAF Confederation Cup: 3 appearances

2008 – First Round of 16
2009 – Group Stage
2010 – First Round of 16
2018 – Finalist

- CAF Cup: 2 appearances

1996 – Semi-Finals
1999 – Second Round

- CAF Cup Winners' Cup: 6 appearances

1976 – Semi-Finals
1979 – Quarter-Finals

1982 – Quarter-Finals
1983 – Quarter-Finals

1984 – Second Round
2002 – Quarter-Finals

== Current squad ==
As of 7 november 2024

Note: Flags indicate national team as defined under FIFA eligibility rules; some limited exceptions apply. Players may hold more than one non-FIFA nationality.

No.	Pos.	Nation	Player
1	GK	BFA	Farid Ouédraogo
3	DF	MLI	Siaka Bagayoko
4	DF	COD	Yannick Bangala (captain)
5	DF	FRA	Glen Matondo
8	FW	COD	Héritier Luvumbu
9	FW	COD	Glody Beyuku Munsi
10	MF	MLI	Aboubacar Diarra
11	MF	RSA	Mahlatsi Makudubela
12	DF	COD	Ayrton Mboko
13	DF	CMR	Pascal Eboussi
15	FW	GHA	Denis Modzaka
17	FW	COM	Affane Djambae
18	GK	UGA	Keni Saidi
20	DF	COD	Edouard Apataki
22	DF	COD	Henoc Lolendo Mansanga
23	MF	SEN	Seck Mamadou
24	DF	CMR	Patrick Etoga
25	FW	NGR	Olorunshola Abayomi
27	MF	COD	Exaucé Kabeya Kanyinda

No.	Pos.	Nation	Player
28	MF	BEN	Ibrahim Ogoulola
29	FW	COD	William Likuta
30	GK	CMR	Junior Dande
31	FW	COD	Emile Kalume
32	MF	COD	Kevine Makoko
33	MF	COD	Merveille Kikasa
34	DF	COD	Jeancy Ngaliema Tampo
36	DF	COD	Patou Ebunga
37	MF	COD	Mardochée Bofaya Mokanga
38	MF	COD	Amos Ngoy Kabangu
39	MF	COD	Sauveur Nzanga Malamu
-	MF	COD	Dieu-Merci Lukombe
-	DF	SEN	Dione Bassirou
-	DF	COD	Djuma Shabani
-	DF	CGO	Varel Rozan
-	MF	COD	Isaac Diendelay
-	MF	COD	Ephraïm Lombo
-	FW	COD	Chico Ushindi
