= Daring Club Motema Pembe =

Association football club in Democratic Republic of the Congo

Motema Pembe
- Full name: Daring Club Motema Pembe – Imana
- Nicknames: Les Immaculés (The Immaculates); Les Toupamaros (The Toupamaros)
- Founded: 22 February 1936; 90 years ago
- Ground: Stade Tata Raphaël
- Capacity: 60,000
- Manager: Mohamed Fathi
- League: Linafoot
- 2024–25: 4th of 20
Home colours	Away colours

Daring Club Motema Pembe, or simply DCMP for a short, is a Congolese professional football club based in Kinshasa.

Created in 1936 under the name Falcon Daring, by the Rev. Father Raphaël de la Kethulle de Ryhove who was a missionary of the Congregation of Scheutistes. He recruited most of its players among college students Sainte-Anne in Kinshasa (currently Elikya college). The DCMP was renamed CS Imana in 1949 before assuming the name of Daring Club Motema Pembe Imana (Imana DCMP) in 1985. With 27 titles at national level since 1963, the DCMP is currently the most successful national club of the DRC. TP Mazembe has more trophies if you include international titles won with 35.

== History ==
=== Early history ===
In December 1916, Reverend Father Raphaël de la Kethulle de Ryhove arrived in Léopoldville (present-day Kinshasa) from Bruges, Belgium. The following year, he established Sainte-Anne School (now Collège Saint-Joseph) named after Paroisse Sainte Anne de Kinshasa. In 1918, several football teams were formed in the city, including those representing Kinshasa School, Léo II, the Coastmen (West African migrants from regions corresponding to modern-day Nigeria, Ghana, Mali, Senegal, Benin, Guinea, and Togo), and Angolan communities. These teams competed in a tournament organized by the Union Sportive de Kinshasa (USK), an organization founded around the same time. Subsequent years saw the establishment of additional clubs, including Léo Club, Renaissance, Standard, Boma Club, Congo Club, and Amicale Kisantu. Matches were held on two main fields: one located on the site of the current embassies of Portugal and the United States, and another in front of the Bralima brewery, on the present site of the Société de Galvanisation de Kinshasa (Sogalkin) and former ACA (Architecture, Construction et Aménagement du Congo) buildings, across from what is now Joseph Kabasele Tshamala Avenue (formerly Avenue du Flambeau) in Barumbu. During this period, players competed barefoot, with football boots only becoming standard after the Second World War, around 1945.

Father Raphaël also promoted extracurricular activities, including scouting and sports, to engage his students. Eighteen years after his arrival, he established three junior-level football teams at the school, adopting the names of Division I teams competing in a formal championship. These teams were called Union, Renaissance, and Standard. Standard was composed primarily of school graduates, including François Mapaku, Albert Mongita, Matthieu Masaya, Gérard Kelon, Michel Kalinga, Pierre Engoba, Ignace Bakute, Hubert Bangala, Alphonse Bandjeka, and Fabien Longange. Since graduates eventually left school to enter professional life, the school sought to maintain its pool of talented players by registering a team in the official championship.

=== Formation of the first Daring team ===
By late 1935, Léopoldville's population had reached approximately 80,000, and the USK was renamed the Fédération Sportive Congolaise (FESCO). Under the leadership of Belgian coach Romain Nelissen, in collaboration with Father Raphaël, a unified team was assembled, combining graduates and current students capable of competing at a high level. Players were required to be physically strong to endure demanding matches, particularly in contests characterized by a ruthless style of play, leaving "no place for choirboys on these battlefields". The team initially included Wabola, Joseph Makosso, Philippe Kanza, Louis Mukoko, Jean Kalimasi, Maurice Moket, Joseph Mpeti, François Mukanda, Jean Bolikango, and Gaston Bongonga. The team, however, didn't have a goalkeeper, and the role was unanimously assigned to François Mapaku Lassy, formerly of Standard. Born on 22 February 1918 on Giri Street (near the current Special/Road Police office and behind the Salvation Army School), Mapaku was residing at 23 Haga Avenue, at the Comfina intersection in CITAS-Barumbu, at the time of his recruitment.

On 22 February 1936, the team was formally named Daring de Bruxelles, reflecting a colonial-era aspiration to emulate developments in Belgium; however, some accounts suggest it was initially founded as Daring Faucon. The team adopted red and yellow colors. Although Mapaku initially faced challenges in a football environment dominated by Renaissance (the predecessor of AS Vita Club), perseverance yielded success. Daring won its first championship in 1945, surpassing its rivals to secure the top position, and went on to claim a second Léopoldville championship in 1949. That same year, the team changed its name to CS Imana.

=== Reorganization ===
In the mid-1950s, Father Raphaël implemented a significant change in the official colors of Léopoldville's top-division football teams. AS Vita Club, which had previously worn a black "V" on its green-and-white jersey, a symbol inspired by an Allied warplane, was required to adopt green and black. The green-and-white colors were subsequently assigned to CS Imana. Amicale Sportive Dragons (AS Dragons) adopted red and yellow with black shorts, which mirrored the tricolor of the Belgian national flag.

A circular issued by Father Raphaël recommended that teams with a large membership establish branch teams to develop younger talent. Sporting de l'École Sainte Anne functioned as a feeder club to F.C. Union, which competed in the first division and, in turn, became a pipeline for CS Imana. Sporting participated in interschool competitions, often barefoot, alongside teams such as Salut Sport, Roitelet, Olympic, and Courrier d'Afrique. Notable players to emerge from these programs included Ebumba, Nzeza Faustin, Samu Mukoko, and Makonga. In 1952, the transition of players from Union to CS Imana became a systematic process. To rejuvenate the team, graduates of the 1950 cohort were incorporated, including goalkeeper Kibiasi, who supported Otomba, and field players such as Ngelebeya, Ignace Tangu, Lusimba, Bernard Masandji, Makakila, André Matingu, Dieudonné Ebeya, Tekasala, and François Egongo. Existing team members included Toti, Roboni Mbangani, Kalala "Nkadia Pemba", Bohulu, Mpeti, Désiré Ngombo "Ressort", Mercator, Miranda, Henri Djambo, Mofe, Holden Roberto (returning from Elisabethville), Alexandre Ngangu, Pierre Osango, Michel Bolikango, Amara, Maufranc (older brother of Etwe), and Abgepa. The sports committee was chaired by Cyrille Adoula, with Charles Pongo as secretary, and members including Arsène Dionge, Henri Ntela, Marcel Bola, and Arthur Amiso. Sponsorship was provided by Paul Gnilo, owner of the Yaka Awa bar at the intersection of Prince Baudouin Avenue and Luvua Street, and Gabriel Lumbu of the Nzinzi bar in the Dendale commune (now Kasa-Vubu). Subsequent changes in player registration rules required athletes to provide proof of employment and to be clerks, which signaled a shift from reliance on school students to a professionalized roster.

=== Internal challenges and revival ===
During the 1954–1955 period, Arthur Amiso served as CS Imana's president, assisted by Mbila, Kinkela, Bunduki, and Armand Maertens, who had transitioned from player to administrator. The team also featured the influential figure of Pereira, an employee of Sogeaf and the club's designated talisman, who was introduced through Amiso's cousin, Jean Longby. On the field, succession was managed by players including Paul Bonga Bonga, Dafirma Nganga, Major Balondo, Androkwa, Lefimbo, Mpasi "Carré", Katete, Matuba, Odjudjwa, and Benjamin Reoynino (aide-de-camp to Gabonese President Ali Bongo Ondimba). At the conclusion of the 1954 season, CS Imana suffered a critical defeat, losing 0–1 to Vaticano on the final day of a championship it had long led. Concurrently, AS Vita Club defeated its rival Union 4–0, securing the title and fueling rumors that Reveira had orchestrated the results against President Amiso, who was subsequently removed from office by Arsène Dionge following allegations of corruption. The controversy extended to Amiso's family, as his wife endured verbal attacks at their residence on 76 Kindu Street, near Reine Astrid Stadium (now Stade Cardinal Malula).

The team's setbacks continued into 1955. Even after a 4–3 victory against Diables Noirs at Eboué Stadium in Brazzaville, the returning delegation was attacked by supporters at the Beach. Despite these challenges, coach Decorte, a bank employee, maintained a strict regimen of technical training. Paul Bonga Bonga was paired with Max Mayunga to provide offensive support. During this period, the team, nicknamed "Matiti Mabe", combined efficiency and flair. Key victories included a 5–1 win against Diables Noirs, capped by a final goal from Dominique, the uncle of future player Camille Mahungu Lutovoka, and a 9–1 triumph over Dragons at Roi Baudouin Stadium (now Stade Tata Raphaël), leaving the opposing defender visibly exasperated. This period also marked the end of AS Vita Club's long-standing dominance over CS Imana, dating back to 1949, as evidenced by a 2–0 scoreline that signaled the club's emerging supremacy under the presidency of Anderson Mayinga.

=== Paul Bonga Bonga and the club's golden era ===
During the mid-1950s, CS Imana achieved notable domestic success, securing consecutive national championships in 1955 and 1956. The team's prominence contributed significantly to the national team, known as the "Lions", during their 1957 tour of Belgium, with nine players selected from CS Imana, including Balondo, Mayunga, Mpase, Nganga, Ebumba, Kibiasi, Androkwa, and Paul Bonga Bonga. Bonga Bonga, regarded as the club's most talented player, was subsequently recruited by Standard de Liège through the efforts of Mr. Hendricks, Secretary-General of the Royal Sporting Association of Belgian Congo and Rwanda-Urundi (Association Royale Sportive du Congo Belge et du Rwanda-Urundi; ARSC). However, in 1958, during the Léo championship, CS Imana squandered a 4–1 lead against AS Vita Club, ultimately losing 5–4, due to injuries, aging players, and claims of poor performance by goalkeeper Mbika. Bonga Bonga remained with Standard de Liège until 1963, winning Belgian league titles in 1958–59, 1959–60, and 1961–62, before moving to Royal Charleroi S.C. He returned permanently to Zaire in 1970, resuming his association with CS Imana. Despite his contributions, Bonga Bonga was never capped for the national team.

CS Imana continued to achieve national success in subsequent decades, winning championships in 1974, 1978, 1985, 1989, 1994, 1996, 1998, 1999, 2004, 2005, and 2008. In 1985, the club officially changed its name to Daring Club Motéma Pembe (DCMP).

In May 2010, DCMP restructured its technical staff shortly before the team's return leg in the seventh CAF Confederation Cup against AS FAN. Zico Kiadivila and Moke Adede were appointed as head coach and assistant coach, respectively, while Frank Kohl retained his position as technical director. The former coaching staff, including Cameroonian Roger Ebouélé and fitness coach Léon Makanzu, were dismissed. Kiadivila and Adede conducted their first training session on 30 April at the Stade des Martyrs training ground and managed the team in the Kinshasa Provincial Football League (Entente provinciale de football de Kinshasa; EPFKin) match against FC Les Stars de Kinshasa on 2 May. Throughout the 2010s, DCMP experienced organizational instability, internal conflicts, and a decline in support. On 16 June 2014, the club split, resulting in the formation of CS Imana by Pascal Mukuna, some staff members, and certain players. In 2015, the club adopted the name Daring Club Motéma Pembe Imana. By 2016, leadership restructuring under Deputy Aubin Minaku aimed to restore the club's competitive status in a national championship increasingly dominated by TP Mazembe and AS Vita Club.

=== Continental success ===
During the 1960s, Daring reestablished itself as a dominant force in Congolese football. In 1960, the arrival of players such as Julien Kialunda, Mambu Roro, Kiala Decoulot, Gabriel Nsay, Léopold Tshiswaka, Esamba, Bessy, Muwawa, Damena, Mombito, Elifa, Amalfi Kalonji, and goalkeepers Kibiasi, Martin Bikoko, Mbunga "Léger", and Dionde reinvigorated the team. Under the presidency of Alphonse Kinkela, with Pascal Bunduki and Mbila as vice-presidents and Isaac Kalonji Mutambayi as secretary, Daring dominated the 1963 championship. In preparation for a European tour contingent on a victory over AS Vita Club in the UN Cup, Daring defeated their rival 2–1. The subsequent matches in Belgium against Royale Union Saint-Gilloise (1–8) and Royal Charleroi S.C. (1–1), as well as in Greece against Panathinaikos F.C. (1–3), were hampered by harsh weather conditions. Nevertheless, Daring capped off its resurgence by winning its first-ever Coupe du Congo the following year.

This national victory allowed the club to participate in the first edition of the African Cup of Champions Clubs, whose trophy was presented by Ghanaian President Kwame Nkrumah. In the first round, Daring faced Oryx de Douala, led by Samuel Mbappé Léppé, drawing 1–1 at home after a 0–1 defeat in Douala. Oryx subsequently advanced to the final triangular tournament in Accra, Ghana, held in February 1965, ultimately claiming the title. Daring's participation marked the first time a Congolese club competed at the continental level, and the team's performance was widely recognized as exemplary. Decades later, the club won the 1994 African Cup Winners' Cup by defeating Kenya Breweries FC, though it lost the subsequent CAF Super Cup to Espérance Sportive de Tunis.

== Crest ==
Present logo

== Honours ==
=== Domestic ===
- Linafoot: 12
  - 1963, 1964, 1974, 1978, 1989, 1994, 1996, 1998, 1999, 2004, 2005, 2008
- Congo Cup: 14
  - 1964, 1974, 1978, 1984, 1985, 1990, 1991, 1993, 1994, 2003, 2006, 2009, 2010, 2021 (Record)
- DR Congo Super Cup: 5
  - 1984, 1987, 1994, 2003, 2005
- Challenge Papa Kalala Cup: 1
  - 1985
- Coupe de la Fécofa: 1
  - 2002
- Coupe de l'Indépendance: 3
  - 1992, 1993, 1994
- Jeux Congolais/Zaïrois: 2
  - 1972, 1974

=== Continental ===
- African Cup Winners' Cup
  - Champions (1): 1994

=== Regional ===
- EPFKIN (Kinshasa)
  - Champions (15): 1963, 1968, 1972, 1973, 1977, 1980, 1985, 1986, 1988, 1994, 1995, 2000, 2003, 2006, 2007
- Super Coupe de Kinshasa
  - Champions (3): 2001, 2004, 2008
