= Léon Mokuna =

Belgian-Congolese footballer (1928–2020)

Personal information
- Full name: Léon Mukuna Mutombo
- Date of birth: 1 November 1928
- Place of birth: Léopoldville, Belgian Congo (modern-day Kinshasa, Democratic Republic of the Congo)
- Date of death: 28 January 2020 (aged 91)
- Place of death: Ghent, Belgium
- Height: 1.75 m (5 ft 9 in)
- Position: Forward

Senior career*
Years	Team	Apps	(Gls)
1954	Victoria Club		
1954–1957	Sporting Lisbon	13	(19)
1957	Victoria Club		
1957–1961	Gent		
1961–1966	SV Waregem		

International career
1959	Belgium B	2	(1)

Managerial career
- 1965: DR Congo
- 1966–1967: TP Engelbert
- 1968–1970: DR Congo
- * Club domestic league appearances and goals

Léon Mokuna Mutombo (1 November 1928 – 28 January 2020), nicknamed Le Trouet or Trouet, was a Belgian-Congolese professional footballer who played for Sporting Lisbon, Gent and SV Waregem between 1954 and 1966. He was among the first Africans to play professionally in Belgium, and may have been the first Congolese player in a European side. His role has been described as "pioneering" by BBC Sport.

== Early life ==
Léon Mokuna was born in Léopoldville, Belgian Congo in 1928 and grew up in Léopoldville (now Kinshasa) where he became a protégé of the football-promoting Scheutist missionary Raphaël de la Kethulle de Ryhove, known as "Tata Raphaël". Playing football in Léopoldville, Mokuna gained the French nickname Le Trouet or Trouet ("little hole", phonetically derived from troué! or "holed!") for reputedly having scoring a goal with such force that it snapped the net. He retained it throughout his playing career.

== Football career ==
Mokuna was originally talent-spotted by Sporting Lisbon which visited Léopoldville in 1954 during a tour of neighbouring Portuguese Angola. He moved to Portugal to play for Sporting from January 1955 and finished the season with 19 goals in 11 games. However, he remained with the team for only two seasons after being "ostracised" before returning to the Congo to play for Victoria Club (today AS Vita Club) at Léopoldville.

In 1957, Mokuna left the Congo for Belgium to play for KAA Gent ("La Gantoise") where he was twice the team's top goalscorer (1959 and 1960) and became "a club icon". At the time, it was widely assumed that Mokuna was the first African to play for a Belgian team and the first Congolese player in a European club. He certainly pre-empted the so-called Belgicains who arrived from the Congo to play at Belgian clubs after 1959. However, a mixed-race player Louis Cousin (1912–89) had played for Daring Brussels during the 1930s and is now thought to hold the title.

Mokuna played twice for the Belgium B national team in 1959. He became the first black player to represent the country, though he blamed racial prejudice for not being selected for the main national side during the same period. He left KAA Gent in 1961, later playing for KSV Waregem (1961–66) and KV Kortrijk where he immediately suffered a double fracture to his leg that ended his playing career. He gained Belgian nationality in 1959.

After Congolese independence in 1960, Mokuna coached the national football team at the 1965 Africa Cup of Nations during the country's first appearance in the tournament. The team lost to Ghana and Cote d'Ivoire and was eliminated. He also managed the Congolese national team from 1968 to 1970.

== Later life and death ==
Mokuna returned to the Congo (later Zaire) after the end of his Belgian football career and worked in business. However, his property was later confiscated by the regime of Mobutu Sese Seko.

He remained in Ghent until his death at age 91 on 28 January 2020. Mokuna is the grandfather of the Belgian footballer David Mukuna-Trouet, born in 2001.

== See also ==
- Paul Bonga Bonga — Congolese footballer who played for Standard Liège from 1957.
