= Paroisse de Sainte-Anne =

Parish in Gombe, Kinshasa

Coordinates: 4°18′03″S 15°18′55″E

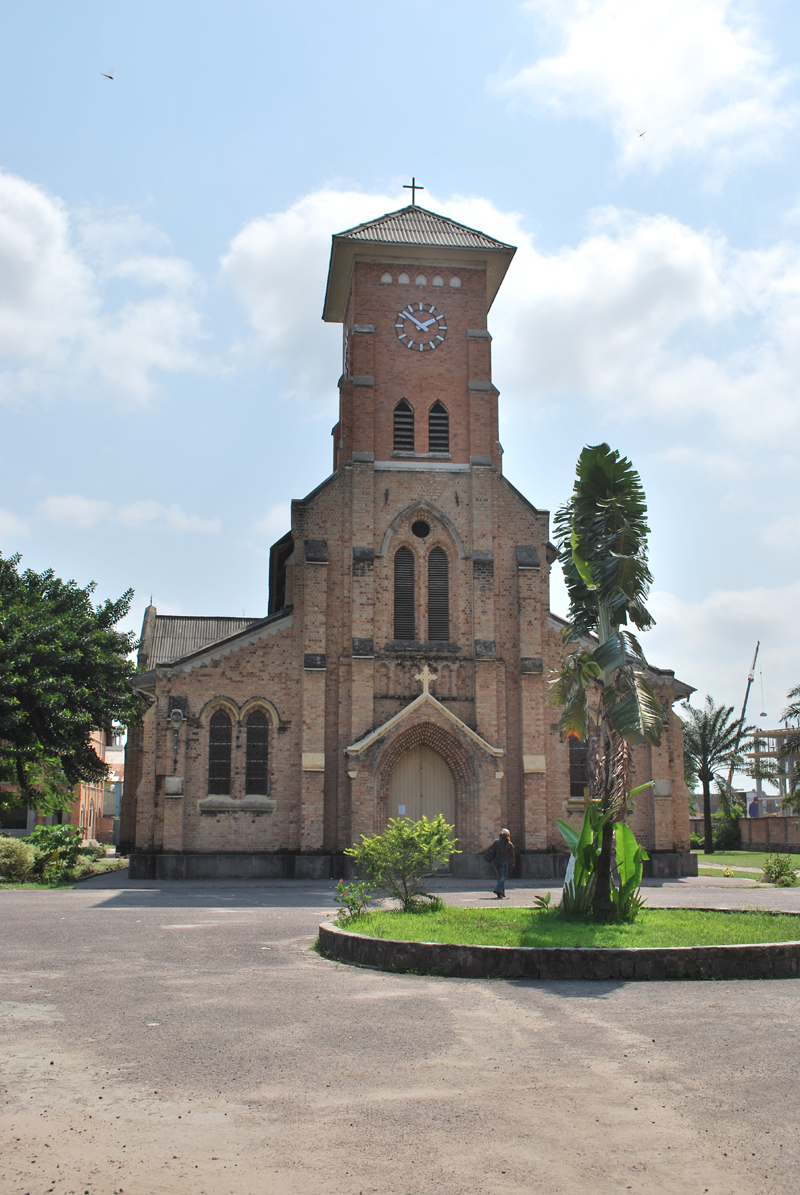
- Exterior view

Religion
- Affiliation: Catholic Church
- Sect: Latin Church
- Province: Archdiocese of Kinshasa
- Deity: Saint Anne
- Rite: Roman Rite
- Ownership: Archdiocese of Kinshasa
- Governing body: Archdiocese of Kinshasa
- Year consecrated: 16 October 1915; 110 years ago
- Status: Active

Location
- Location: Gombe, Kinshasa, Democratic Republic of the Congo
- Interactive map of Paroisse de Sainte-Anne

Architecture
- Style: Neo-Gothic
- Completed: 1917; 109 years ago

Paroisse de Sainte-Anne (French for "Saint Anne's Parish") or Église Sainte-Anne ("Saint Anne's Church") is a Roman Catholic parish church located near the Central Station in Gombe, Kinshasa. It belongs to the Saint Pierre Deanery of the Archdiocese of Kinshasa. Founded in 1903 as a small mission outpost served by Congolese catechists from the Catholic St. Leopold mission parish in Kintambo, it gradually grew into one of the city's most historically significant churches.

In 1912, Msgr. François Camille Van Ronslé commissioned Father Remi Calon to build a cathedral south of the railway station, and construction began in June under Father René Reygaerts. The foundation stone was laid the next year, and on 16 October 1915 the first Mass was held in the still-unfinished structure, possibly inspired by the recent opening of a nearby British Baptist church on Avenue Van Gèle. Completed in 1917, the brick church was characterized by its red masonry and neo-Gothic arcades. That same year, Father Raphaël de la Kethulle de Ryhove arrived and went on to play a pivotal role in the development of education for Congolese youth and the promotion of football associations across the city. The current structure, completed in 1965, was the first major architectural achievement of Brother Jos Smets. Sainte-Anne served as the cathedral and episcopal seat for Bishops Joris Six, Félix Scalais, and Joseph Malula until 1972, when this role passed to Cathédrale Sainte-Marie de Lingwala (also called Cathédrale du Centenaire), dedicated to Our Lady of the Congo. In 1988, after the Congregation of the Fathers of Scheut transferred the parish to the archdiocese, Cardinal Malula appointed Father Pierre Baza as parish priest, succeeding Father André Marchal; Baza became the parish's first Black pastor. He was succeeded in August 1998 by Father Antoine Ntoto Vangu.

Today, the church compound includes the Missions Procuracy, Collège Saint-Joseph, and the parish church itself. Over the course of more than a century, Sainte-Anne has become a central landmark in Kinshasa, hosting major thanksgiving services tied to important moments in the Catholic Church and the Congolese nation. Every 11 November, the Belgian community in Kinshasa gathers there with the Belgian ambassador to sing the Te Deum in honor of the King of the Belgians.

== History ==
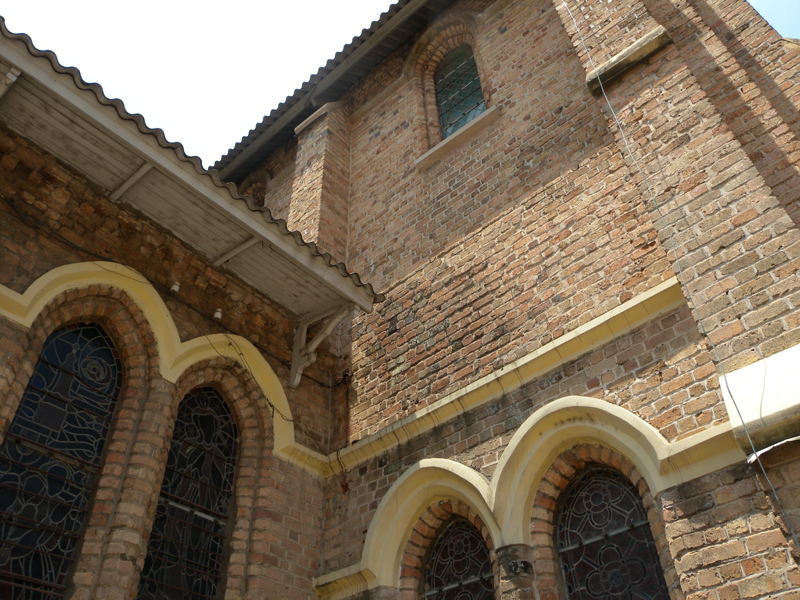
A close-up view of Sainte-Anne, showing its brick exterior with arched stained-glass windows framed by yellow trim, a section of the roof with corrugated metal sheets supported by white wooden brackets, and the upper part of the building with a small window set into the brick wall.

Sainte-Anne parish was established in 1903 as a small outpost of the Catholic St. Leopold mission parish in Kintambo, served by Congolese catechists. In 1912, Father Henri Kestens took up residence on the site, although no church building had yet been constructed. That same year, Msgr. François Camille Van Ronslé directed Father Remi Calon to build a cathedral south of the Kinshasa Central Station, and construction began in June under Father René Reygaerts. Father Calon laid the cornerstone in 1913, and on 16 October 1915, the first Mass was celebrated in the unfinished structure, likely prompted by the recent inauguration of the nearby British Baptist church on Avenue Van Gèle. The brick church, noted for its red masonry and neo-Gothic arcades, was completed in 1917. That year also marked the arrival of Father Raphaël de la Kethulle de Ryhove, who initiated educational programs for Congolese youth and promoted football associations throughout the city.

In 1923, Father Raphaël founded Sainte-Anne School (now Collège Saint-Joseph) at Sainte-Anne. Among its teachers was the father of Joseph Athanase Tshamala Kabasele, the musician who would later gain fame in the 1960s, who moved from Boma to Léopoldville to teach. During the colonial period, Sainte-Anne remained the principal Catholic church in the city, even after the construction of Cathédrale Notre-Dame du Congo (meaning "Our Lady of the Congo Cathedral") in the Cité in 1947. Earlier, on 9 June 1946, the parish had hosted the ordinations of Cardinal Joseph Malula and Bishop Eugène Moke Motsüri. In 1965, Father Jos Smets remodeled the church, raising the steeple, though the lighter-colored bricks marked a departure from the original design. Sainte-Anne served as cathedral and episcopal seat for Bishops Joris Six, Félix Scalais, and Malula until 1972, when the Cathédrale Sainte-Marie de Lingwala (also known as Cathédrale du Centenaire), dedicated to Our Lady of the Congo, became the new cathedral.

In 1988, when the Congregation of the Fathers of Scheut entrusted the parish to the Archdiocese of Kinshasa, Cardinal Malula appointed Father Pierre Baza as parish priest, making him the first Black pastor of Sainte-Anne. He was succeeded in August 1998 by Father Antoine Ntoto Vangu, and later in 2004 by Father José Moko Ekanga. During the parish centennial in 2005, Abbé José Moke appealed for $250,000 to replace the church roof. Over its history from 1915 to 2005, Sainte-Anne has recorded 10,792 baptisms and celebrated 1,915 religious marriages. In December 2006, Abbé Jean-Freddy Bobo was installed as parish priest in a ceremony presided over by Daniel Nlandu Mayi, Auxiliary Bishop and Vicar General of the Archdiocese of Kinshasa.
