= Paul Bonga Bonga =

Congolese footballer (born 1933)

Personal information
- Date of birth: 25 April 1933 (age 93)
- Place of birth: Ebonda, Belgian Congo
- Position: Midfielder

Senior career*
Years	Team	Apps	(Gls)
1952–1954	Union		
1954–1957	Motema Pembe		
1957–1963	Standard Liège	100	(7)
1963–1967	Charleroi		
- * Club domestic league appearances and goals

Paul Bonga Bonga (born 25 April 1933) is a Congolese footballer of the 1950s and 1960s. A midfielder, he rose to prominence during his time in Belgium at Standard Liège and was perhaps best remembered as the first African footballer to be selected in the World Soccer Magazine world XI, when he was chosen in 1961.

== Career ==
Bonga was born in Ebonda. He started playing football barefoot, in 1948 for the Golden Lion and then for Sporting, St. Anne College team. In 1950, he joined Union and put on his first boots. He was transferred in 1952 to Daring Club Motema Pembe. In 1956, while on a European tour, he was noticed by sports journalists, particularly for his match against the Standard Liège. In late 1957 he was invited to Standard, and became Belgian champion in the seasons of 1958–1960.

In 1960, Bonga Bonga finished as runner-up to Paul Van Himst in voting for the Soulier d'Or, the Belgian Golden Shoe. It was the only occasion in the first twenty years of the award that a non-Belgian player finished in the top three players of the year.

In 1961, World Soccer Magazine selected Bonga Bonga in the World XI, alongside Pelé, Alfredo Di Stefano or Ferenc Puskás. He was rewarded for his pace, energy and fine skills that made him the motor of a strong Standard Liege team.

In 1962, Bonga Bonga became the first non-naturalised African player to feature in the semi-final of the European Cup.

After playing for more than 10 years in Belgian clubs, Bonga retired in 1970 and became a coach at FC Tubize. After returning home in 1972, Bonga led Daring Club Motema Pembe before assuming the post of President Sportif. In 1991, he was appointed National Technical Director of the Leopards (present-day Simba).

== Timeline ==
- 1948 – 1951 : Lion d'or, puis Sporting Club
- 1952 – 1954 : Union
- 1954 – 1957 : Daring Club Motema Pembe
- 1956: Médaille d'or de l'association "Royale Sportive Congolaise"
- 1957 – 1963 : Standard de Liège (Belgique)
- 1961: Plaquette + prix de l'effort Sportif de la ville de Liège
- 1962:
  - Médaille d'or trophée Pappaert (Journal les sports de Bruxelles)
  - Médaille de bronze du Ministère de la santé et de la famille de Liège
  - Soulier d'argent (2ème meilleur joueur Européen)
- 1963 – 1967 : Sporting de Charleroi
- 1968 – 1970: Moteur breveté/Ecole des entraïneur à Heysel 1972 – 1973 : Entraîneur DCMP
- 1976: Médaille d'or / mérite sportif Congolais
- 1981: Président du DCMP
- 1984 – 1991: Directeur Technique National et Membre de la Fecofa

== Honours ==
Team

Daring Club Motema Pembe

- Léopoldville Championship: 1955, 1956

Standard Liège

- Belgian First Division: 1957–58, 1960–61, 1962–63

Individual

- World Soccer World XI: 1961
- Gold Medal of the Royal Congolese Sports Association: 1956
- Plaquette and Sports Merit Award of the City of Liège: 1961
- Gold Medal of the Pappaert Trophy: 1962
- Bronze Medal of the Ministry of Health and Family of Liège: 1962
- Belgian Golden Shoe runner-up: 1960
- Gold Medal of Congolese Sporting Merit: 1976

== See also ==
- Léon Mokuna
