= Brian Glanville =

English football writer (1931–2025)

- Born: Brian Lester Glanville; 24 September 1931; Hendon, Middlesex, England
- Died: 16 May 2025 (aged 93)
- Occupations: Sportswriter; novelist
- Writing career
- Subject: Football

Brian Lester Glanville (24 September 1931 – 16 May 2025) was an English football writer and novelist. He was described by The Times as "the doyen of football writers—arguably the finest football writer of his—or any other—generation", and by American journalist Paul Zimmerman as "the greatest football writer of all time."

== Early life ==
Brian Glanville was born in Hendon, London, the son of an Irish dentist of Lithuanian Jewish descent, Joseph, who changed his name from Goldberg to Glanville, and Florence (née Manches), who was from Russian and Polish Jews. He was taken to watch Arsenal in 1942, and became a lifelong fan. Glanville was educated at Charterhouse School, where he played football. After Charterhouse, he chose not to go to Oxford because he did not receive a scholarship.

== Career ==
After leaving school, Glanville worked for a time as an articled clerk in a London law firm, before he started writing football articles and books. He had a lengthy career as a writer, beginning with writing articles for a magazine called Sport, and ghost-writing Cliff Bastin Remembers, the autobiography of the Arsenal winger, at 19. A noted critique of the British style of sportswriting in Encounter magazine in the late 1950s lamented the lack of depth compared with the American style of Red Smith, Damon Runyon or A. J. Liebling. As a journalist he spent over 30 years as a football correspondent for The Sunday Times (1958–1992), and later returned to contribute pieces to the paper until as late as 2020. He also contributed to World Soccer magazine for over 50 years in print and online, and authored a weekly column for the website covering a range of issues.

He spent a significant part of his early career based in Italy and was seen as one of the leading authorities on Italian football as a result. Whilst based in both Florence and Rome, he wrote regularly for the Italian daily Corriere dello Sport (he was hired as their English correspondent in 1949), as well as occasional pieces for La Stampa and Corriere della Sera.

In the 1960s and 1970s, Glanville was a member of the jury which awards the yearly Ballon d'Or France Football (or European Footballer of the Year award). In addition he wrote for The People and since 1999 contributed numerous obituaries of prominent players to The Guardian.

His work was seen in publications such as Sports Illustrated and the New Statesman, and the prominent American football writer Paul Zimmerman called him "the greatest football writer of all time."

During the 1960s, Glanville worked as a writer for the satirical BBC TV programme That Was The Week That Was and wrote the screenplay for Goal!, the BAFTA award-winning official film of the 1966 World Cup, to which he also contributed the commentary. As a novelist he wrote mostly about football and life in Italy, with his 1956 novel Along the Arno particularly well received by critics. He also wrote The Story of the World Cup, a frequently updated history of the FIFA tournament. He was also an investigative journalist for the Sunday Times, writing on the match-fixing in the European Cup in the 1970s, particularly by Italian clubs.

From the mid-1960s to the 1980s, Glanville organised and ran his own successful (largely) amateur football team, Chelsea Casuals, which, depending on the quality of the opposition, comprised a motley collection of actors, artists, radio, TV and newspaper journalists, university graduates and undergraduates (mainly drawn from the LSE), friends (occasionally professional soccer players and from other sports including cricket). Anecdotes in his book of short stories The King of Hackney Marshes (1965) drew heavily on experiences gained not only from games on the Hackney Marshes but also at Wormwood Scrubs playing fields, the Chelsea Hospital ground and elsewhere.

Glanville was a lifelong supporter of Arsenal F.C. He was noted for taking a critical view of many issues, often in contrast to the typical British sportswriter. Since its formation, he criticised the Premier League as the "Greed is Good League" and FIFA president Sepp Blatter is referred to as "Sepp (50 ideas a day, 51 bad) Blatter". Glanville said: "The World Cup has become worse and worse over the years—it is bloated. Whatever Sepp Blatter thinks he knows is only secondary to the money he wants to make." He also said there are "far too many foreigners in the Premier League" and he criticised the spending of clubs like Manchester City and Chelsea as "repugnant".

After covering England for many years, Glanville developed relationships with a few of the managers. He stated that Alf Ramsey could be "very spiky, but in the final analysis I didn't get on badly with him and he gave people access." Glanville also mentioned how he thought Bobby Robson was "grotesquely overrated", that he was "a very inadequate manager and he failed so badly in Europe" (a reference to the failure to qualify for UEFA Euro 1984 and England's group stage exit from UEFA Euro 1988), and that nearly reaching the 1990 World Cup final was "down to luck more than judgement". However, he was effusive in his praise of Paul Gascoigne in the latter, saying he had displayed "a flair, a superlative technique, a tactical sophistication, seldom matched by an England player since the war".

== Personal life and death ==
Glanville married Pamela (de Boer, nee Manasse) in 1959. They had two sons and two daughters. His wife died in 2016.

Glanville suffered from tuberculosis in his early career, and stayed in a nursing home for seven months. He had a quadruple bypass operation after suffering a heart attack in 2009. Glanville died on 16 May 2025, at the age of 93.

== Bibliography ==
=== Novels ===
- The Reluctant Dictator – London, Laurie, 1952.
- Henry Sows the Wind – London, Secker and Warburg, 1954.
- Along the Arno – London, Secker and Warburg, 1956; New York, Crowell, 1957.
- The Bankrupts – London, Secker and Warburg, and New York, Doubleday, 1958.
- After Rome, Africa – London, Secker and Warburg, 1959.
- Diamond – London, Secker and Warburg, and New York, FarrarStraus, 1962.
- The Rise of Gerry Logan – London, Secker and Warburg, 1963; New York, Delacorte Press, 1965.
- A Second Home – London, Secker and Warburg, 1965; New York, Delacorte Press, 1966.
- A Roman Marriage – London, Joseph, 1966; New York, CowardMcCann, 1967.
- The Artist Type – London, Cape, 1967; New York, Coward McCann, 1968.
- The Olympian – New York, Coward McCann, and London, Secker and Warburg, 1969.
- A Cry of Crickets – London, Secker and Warburg, and New York, Coward McCann, 1970.
- Goalkeepers are Different – London, Hamish Hamilton Children's Books, 1971.
- The Financiers – London, Secker and Warburg, 1972; as Money Is Love, New York, Doubleday, 1972.
- The Thing He Loves – London Secker & Warburg, 1974.
- The Comic – London, Secker and Warburg, 1974; New York, Stein and Day, 1975.
- The Dying of the Light – London, Secker and Warburg, 1976.
- Never Look Back – London, Joseph, 1980.
- Kissing America – London, Blond, 1985.
- The Catacomb – London, Hodder and Stoughton, 1988.
- Dictators – London, Smaller Sky Books, 2001.

=== Short stories ===
- A Bad Streak and Other Stories – London, Secker and Warburg, 1961.
- The Director's Wife and Other Stories – London, Secker and Warburg, 1963.
- Goalkeepers Are Crazy: A Collection of Football Stories – London, Secker and Warburg, 1964.
- The King of Hackney Marshes and Other Stories – London, Secker and Warburg, 1965.
- A Betting Man – New York, Coward McCann, 1969.
- Penguin Modern Stories 10, with others – London, Penguin, 1972.
- The Thing He Loves and Other Stories – London, Secker and Warburg, 1973.
- A Bad Lot and Other Stories – London, Penguin, 1977.
- Love Is Not Love and Other Stories – London, Blond, 1985.

=== Plays ===
- Visit to the Villa (produced Chichester, Sussex, 1981).
- Underneath the Arches, with Patrick Garland and Roy Hudd (produced Chichester, Sussex, 1981; London, 1982).

=== Screenplays (documentary) ===
- Goal!, 1967.

=== Radio plays ===
- The Diary, 1987; I Could Have Been King, 1988.
- Television Documentaries: European Centre Forward, 1963.

=== Other ===
- Cliff Bastin Remembers, with Cliff Bastin. London, Ettrick Press, 1950.
- Arsenal Football Club, London, Convoy, 1952.
- Soccer Nemesis, London, Secker and Warburg, 1955.
- World Cup, with Jerry Weinstein. London, Hale, 1958.
- Over the Bar, with Jack Kelsey. London, Paul, 1958.
- Soccer round the Globe, London, Abelard Schuman, 1959.
- Know about Football (for children). London, Blackie, 1963.
- World Football Handbook (annual), London, Hodder and Stoughton, 1964; London, Mayflower, 1966–72; London, Queen Anne Press, 1974.
- People in Sport, London, Secker and Warburg, 1967.
- Soccer: A History of the Game, Its Players, and Its Strategy, New York, Crown, 1968; as Soccer: A Panorama, London, Eyre and Spottiswoode, 1969.
- The Puffin Book of Football (for children), London, Penguin, 1970; revised edition, 1984.
- Goalkeepers Are Different (for children), London, Hamish Hamilton, 1971; New York, Crown, 1972.
- Brian Glanville's Book of World Football, London, Dragon, 1972.
- The Sunday Times History of the World Cup, London, Times Newspapers, 1973; as History of the Soccer World Cup, New York, Macmillan, 1974; revised edition, as The History of the World Cup, London, Faber, 1980, 1984; revised edition, as The Story of the World Cup, London, Faber, 1997.
- The Sunday Times World Football Handbook 1976, London, Playfair, Queen Anne Press, (1975?).
- Target Man (for children), London, Macdonald and Jane's, 1978.
- The Puffin Book of Footballers, London, Penguin, 1978; revised edition, as Brian Glanville's Book of Footballers, 1982.
- A Book of Soccer, New York, Oxford University Press, 1979.
- Kevin Keegan (for children), London, Hamish Hamilton, 1981.
- The Puffin Book of Tennis (for children), London, Penguin, 1981.
- The Puffin Book of the World Cup (for children), London, Penguin, 1984.
- The British Challenge (on the Los Angeles Olympics team), with Kevin Whitney, London, Muller, 1984.
- Footballers Don't Cry: Selected Writings, London, Virgin, 1999.
- Football Memories, London, Virgin, 1999.
- Arsenal Stadium History, London, Hamlyn, 2006.
- England Managers: The Toughest Job in Football, London, Headline, 2007.
- Editor, Footballer's Who's Who, London, Ettrick Press, 1951.
- Editor, The Footballer's Companion, London, Eyre and Spottiswoode, 1962.
- Editor, The Joy of Football, London, Hodder and Stoughton, 1986.
