= Max Mayunga =

Congolese footballer (born 1934)

Personal information
- Full name: Maximilien-Gabriel Mayunga
- Date of birth: 28 October 1934 (age 92)
- Place of birth: Belgian Congo
- Position: Striker

Senior career*
Years	Team	Apps	(Gls)
1957–1959	Daring Club Léopoldville		
1959–1966	Daring Club Brussels	150	(35)

Managerial career
- 1966: Daring Club Kinshasa
- * Club domestic league appearances and goals

Maximilien-Gabriel Mayunga (born 28 October 1934) is a former football striker and manager who played professionally in Belgium.

== Career ==
Mayunga began playing football in his home town of Léopoldville (now Kinshasa), and after participating in a friendly match between Belgian First Division side Royale Union Saint-Gilloise and a Léopoldville selection, he was signed by local side Daring Club Léopoldville before moving to Belgium to join Daring Club Brussels. Mayunga appeared in 150 matches and scored 35 goals for Daring Club from 1959 to 1966, when he was recalled to Congo-Kinshasa. Upon his return to Kinshasa, Mayunga became the manager of Daring Club.
