= World Soccer (magazine) =

English-language football magazine

- Cover of the October 2024 issue
- Editor: Stephen Fishlock
- Categories: Football
- Frequency: Monthly
- Circulation: 331,000 (Jan–Dec 2013)
- Founded: 1960
- Company: Kelsey Media
- Based in: Farnborough, Hampshire, UK
- Language: English
- Website: worldsoccer.com
- ISSN: 0043-9037

World Soccer is an English-language association football magazine, published by Kelsey Media. The magazine was established in 1960 and is the oldest continually published football magazine in the United Kingdom. It specialises in the international football scene. Its regular contributing writers include Brian Glanville, Keir Radnedge, Sid Lowe, Tim Vickery, and Henry Winter. World Soccer is a member of the European Sports Media (ESM), an umbrella group of similar magazines printed in other languages. The members of this group elect a European "Team of the Month" and a European "Team of the Year". Since 1982, World Soccer has also organised "Player of the Year", "Manager of the Year" and "Team of the Year" awards.

== History ==
The magazine was first published in London in October 1960, by Echo Publications. The first edition featured an image of Titus Buberník and Svatopluk Pluskal on the front cover. It was edited by Robert Bolle, with Graham Payne, editor of weekly sister publication Soccer Star, as features editor; Jack Rollin, who later edited The Football Yearbook for many years, as home editor; and Eric Batty as overseas editor. Batty, who later edited the magazine, published an annual World XI from 1960 to 1992. Brian Glanville had written a column for the magazine since April 1963. In 1970, Soccer Star, which was first published on 20 September 1952 as Raich Carter's Soccer Star, was incorporated into World Soccer. Keir Radnedge, who had been associate editor, took over from Philip Rising as editor in the late 1980s and was replaced by deputy editor Gavin Hamilton in January 1998 and became executive editor. Radnedge continues to have a monthly column in the magazine.

TI Media (formerly IPC Magazines, IPC Media and Time Inc. UK) published the magazine until the May 2020 issue with Kelsey Media taking over the following issue after they acquired the title from Future plc (owner of competing title FourFourTwo), the corporate successor of TI Media. Hamilton, who had worked for World Soccer for 26 years, stepped down as editor after publishing the 60th anniversary edition in June 2020. Other regular contributors have included Paul Gardner, with a focus on football in the United States; David Conn; Jonathan Wilson; Mark Gleeson on African football; and Tim Vickery, Brian Homewood, and Eric Weil on South American football.

== Award winners ==
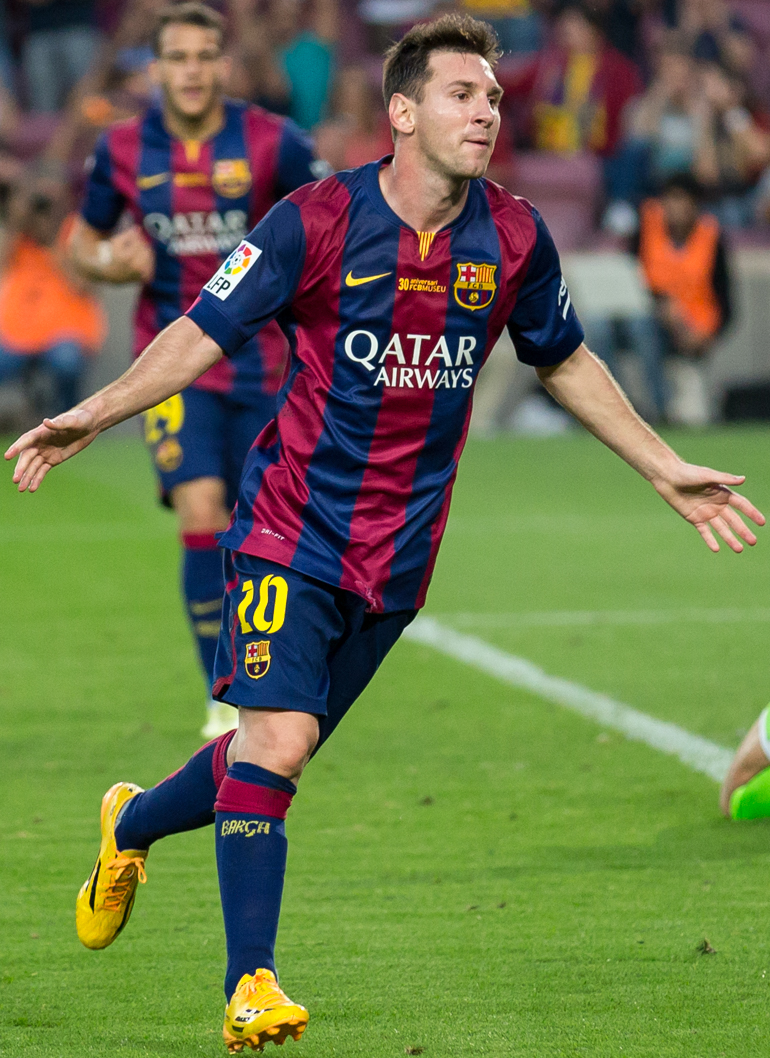
Lionel Messi is the record winner of World Soccer awards having won a total of nine: six Men's World Player of the Year awards and three (consecutive) Young Player of the Year awards. He has also been included in the Greatest XI of all time.

=== Men's World Player of the Year ===
Year	Player	Club
1982	Paolo Rossi (ITA) (23%)	(Italy) Juventus
1983	Zico (BRA) (28%)	(Italy) Udinese Calcio
1984	Michel Platini (FRA) (54%)	(Italy) Juventus
1985	Michel Platini (FRA) (21%)	(Italy) Juventus
1986	Diego Maradona (ARG) (36%)	(Italy) S.S.C. Napoli
1987	Ruud Gullit (NED) (39%)	(Italy) A.C. Milan
1988	Marco van Basten (NED) (43%)	(Italy) A.C. Milan
1989	Ruud Gullit (NED) (24%)	(Italy) A.C. Milan
1990	Lothar Matthäus (GER) (22%)	(Italy) Inter Milan
1991	Jean-Pierre Papin (FRA) (25%)	(France) Olympique de Marseille
1992	Marco van Basten (NED) (19%)	(Italy) A.C. Milan
1993	Roberto Baggio (ITA) (14%)	(Italy) Juventus
1994	Paolo Maldini (ITA) (27%)	(Italy) A.C. Milan
1995	Gianluca Vialli (ITA) (18%)	(Italy) Juventus
1996	Ronaldo (BRA) (17%)	(Spain) FC Barcelona
1997	Ronaldo (BRA) (27%)	(Spain) FC Barcelona & (Italy) Inter Milan
1998	Zinedine Zidane (FRA) (23%)	(Italy) Juventus
1999	Rivaldo (BRA) (42%)	(Spain) FC Barcelona
2000	Luís Figo (POR) (26%)	(Spain) FC Barcelona & (Spain) Real Madrid
2001	Michael Owen (ENG) (31%)	(England) Liverpool F.C.
2002	Ronaldo (BRA) (26%)	(Italy) Inter Milan & (Spain) Real Madrid
2003	Pavel Nedvěd (CZE) (36%)	(Italy) Juventus
2004	Ronaldinho (BRA) (29%)	(Spain) FC Barcelona
2005	Ronaldinho (BRA) (39%)	(Spain) FC Barcelona
2006	Fabio Cannavaro (ITA) (40%)	(Italy) Juventus & (Spain) Real Madrid
2007	Kaká (BRA) (52%)	(Italy) A.C. Milan
2008	Cristiano Ronaldo (POR) (48.4%)	(England) Manchester United
2009	Lionel Messi (ARG) (43.2%)	(Spain) FC Barcelona
2010	Xavi (ESP) (25.8%)	(Spain) FC Barcelona
2011	Lionel Messi (ARG) (60.2%)	(Spain) FC Barcelona
2012	Lionel Messi (ARG) (47.33%)	(Spain) FC Barcelona
2013	Cristiano Ronaldo (POR)	(Spain) Real Madrid
2014	Cristiano Ronaldo (POR)	(Spain) Real Madrid
2015	Lionel Messi (ARG)	(Spain) FC Barcelona
2016	Cristiano Ronaldo (POR)	(Spain) Real Madrid
2017	Cristiano Ronaldo (POR)	(Spain) Real Madrid
2018	Luka Modrić (CRO)	(Spain) Real Madrid
2019	Lionel Messi (ARG)	(Spain) FC Barcelona
2020	Robert Lewandowski (POL)	(Germany) Bayern Munich
2021	Robert Lewandowski (POL)	(Germany) Bayern Munich
2022	Lionel Messi (ARG)	(France) Paris Saint-Germain
2023	Erling Haaland (NOR)	(England) Manchester City
2024	Rodri (ESP)	(England) Manchester City
2025	Ousmane Dembélé (FRA)	(France) Paris Saint-Germain

==== All-time wins ====
===== By player =====
#	Player	Wins
1	Lionel Messi (ARG)	6
2	Cristiano Ronaldo (POR)	5
3	Ronaldo (BRA)	3
4	Michel Platini (FRA)	2
4	Ruud Gullit (NED)	2
4	Marco van Basten (NED)	2
4	Ronaldinho (BRA)	2
4	Robert Lewandowski (POL)	2
9	Paolo Rossi (ITA)	1
9	Zico (BRA)	1
9	Diego Maradona (ARG)	1
9	Lothar Matthäus (GER)	1
9	Jean-Pierre Papin (FRA)	1
9	Roberto Baggio (ITA)	1
9	Paolo Maldini (ITA)	1
9	Gianluca Vialli (ITA)	1
9	Zinedine Zidane (FRA)	1
9	Rivaldo (BRA)	1
9	Luís Figo (POR)	1
9	Michael Owen (ENG)	1
9	Pavel Nedvěd (CZE)	1
9	Fabio Cannavaro (ITA)	1
9	Kaká (BRA)	1
9	Xavi (ESP)	1
9	Luka Modrić (CRO)	1
9	Erling Haaland (NOR)	1
9	Rodri (ESP)	1
9	Ousmane Dembélé (FRA)	1

===== By country =====
#	Country	Wins
1	Brazil	8
2	Argentina	7
3	Portugal	6
4	Italy	5
4	France	5
6	Netherlands	4
7	Poland	2
7	Spain	2
9	Germany	1
9	Czech Republic	1
9	England	1
9	Croatia	1
9	Norway	1

===== By league =====
#	League	Wins
1	La Liga (SPA)	20
2	Serie A (ITA)	19
3	Premier League (ENG)	4
4	Ligue 1 (FRA)	3
5	Bundesliga (GER)	2

=== Young Player of the Year ===
Year	Player	Club
2005	Robinho (BRA) (30%)	(Brazil) Santos FC & (Spain) Real Madrid
2006	Lionel Messi (ARG) (36%)	(Spain) FC Barcelona
2007	Lionel Messi (ARG) (34%)	(Spain) FC Barcelona
2008	Lionel Messi (ARG) (44%)	(Spain) FC Barcelona
2009	Sergio Agüero (ARG) (45.1)	(Spain) Atlético Madrid
2010	Thomas Müller (GER) (45.8)	(Germany) Bayern Munich
2011	Neymar (BRA) (29.2%)	(Brazil) Santos FC

=== Men's World Manager of the Year ===
Year	Manager	Team
1982	Enzo Bearzot (ITA) (49%)	Italy
1983	Sepp Piontek (GER) (29%)	Denmark
1984	Michel Hidalgo (FRA) (30%)	France
1985	Terry Venables (ENG) (30%)	(Spain) FC Barcelona
1986	Guy Thys (BEL) (15%)	Belgium
1987	Johan Cruijff (NED) (25%)	(Netherlands) Ajax Amsterdam
1988	Rinus Michels (NED) (48%)	Netherlands & (Germany) Bayer Leverkusen
1989	Arrigo Sacchi (ITA) (42%)	(Italy) AC Milan
1990	Franz Beckenbauer (GER) (53%)	Germany
1991	Michel Platini (FRA) (42%)	France
1992	Richard Møller-Nielsen (DEN) (28%)	Denmark
1993	Alex Ferguson (SCO) (21%)	(England) Manchester United
1994	Carlos Alberto Parreira (BRA) (17%)	Brazil
1995	Louis van Gaal (NED) (42%)	(Netherlands) Ajax Amsterdam
1996	Berti Vogts (GER) (28%)	Germany
1997	Ottmar Hitzfeld (GER) (17%)	(Germany) Borussia Dortmund
1998	Arsène Wenger (FRA) (28%)	(England) Arsenal
1999	Alex Ferguson (SCO) (60%)	(England) Manchester United
2000	Dino Zoff (ITA) (18%)	Italy
2001	Gérard Houllier (FRA) (28%)	(England) Liverpool F.C.
2002	Guus Hiddink (NED) (28%)	South Korea
2003	Carlo Ancelotti (ITA) (20%)	(Italy) A.C. Milan
2004	José Mourinho (POR) (36%)	(Portugal) FC Porto & (England) Chelsea
2005	José Mourinho (POR) (34.1%)	(England) Chelsea
2006	Marcello Lippi (ITA) (36%)	Italy
2007	Alex Ferguson (SCO) (26%)	(England) Manchester United
2008	Alex Ferguson (SCO) (38%)	(England) Manchester United
2009	Pep Guardiola (ESP) (62.1%)	(Spain) FC Barcelona
2010	José Mourinho (POR) (48.3%)	(Italy) Inter Milan & (Spain) Real Madrid
2011	Pep Guardiola (ESP) (33.1%)	(Spain) FC Barcelona
2012	Vicente del Bosque (ESP) (28.49%)	Spain
2013	Jupp Heynckes (GER)	(Germany) Bayern Munich
2014	Joachim Löw (GER)	Germany
2015	Luis Enrique (ESP)	(Spain) FC Barcelona
2016	Claudio Ranieri (ITA)	(England) Leicester City
2017	Zinedine Zidane (FRA)	(Spain) Real Madrid
2018	Didier Deschamps (FRA)	France
2019	Jürgen Klopp (GER)	(England) Liverpool F.C.
2020	Hansi Flick (GER)	(Germany) Bayern Munich
2021	Roberto Mancini (ITA)	Italy
2022	Lionel Scaloni (ARG)	Argentina
2023	Pep Guardiola (ESP)	(England) Manchester City
2024	Carlo Ancelotti (ITA)	(Spain) Real Madrid
2025	Luis Enrique (ESP)	(France) Paris Saint-Germain

==== All-time wins ====
===== By manager =====
No.	Manager	Wins
1	Alex Ferguson (SCO)	4
2	José Mourinho (POR)	3
2	Pep Guardiola (ESP)	3
3	Carlo Ancelotti (ITA)	2
3	Luis Enrique (ESP)	2

===== By country =====
No.	Country	Wins
1	Germany	8
1	Italy	8
3	France	6
3	Spain	6
5	Netherlands	4
5	Scotland	4
7	Portugal	3
8	England	1
8	Belgium	1
8	Denmark	1
8	Brazil	1
8	Argentina	1

=== Men's World Team of the Year ===
Year	Club
1982	Brazil
1983	Hamburger SV (GER)
1984	France
1985	Everton (ENG)
1986	Argentina
1987	Porto (POR)
1988	Netherlands
1989	Milan (ITA)
1990	West Germany
1991	France
1992	Denmark
1993	Parma (ITA)
1994	Milan (ITA)
1995	Ajax (NED)
1996	Nigeria
1997	Borussia Dortmund (GER)
1998	France
1999	Manchester United (ENG)
2000	France
2001	Liverpool (ENG)
2002	Brazil
2003	Milan (ITA)
2004	Greece
2005	Liverpool (ENG)
2006	Barcelona (ESP)
2007	Iraq
2008	Spain
2009	Barcelona (ESP)
2010	Spain
2011	Barcelona (ESP)
2012	Spain47.4%
2013	Bayern Munich (GER)
2014	Germany
2015	Barcelona (ESP)
2016	Leicester City (ENG)
2017	Real Madrid (ESP)
2018	France
2019	Liverpool (ENG)
2020	Bayern Munich (GER)
2021	Italy
2022	Argentina
2023	Manchester City (ENG)
2024	Spain
2025	Paris Saint-Germain (FRA)

==== By team ====
#	Team	Wins
1	France	5
2	Barcelona (ESP)	4
2	Spain	4
4	Liverpool (ENG)	3
4	Milan (ITA)	3
6	Brazil	2
6	Germany	2
6	Bayern Munich (GER)	2
6	Argentina	2

=== Women's World Player of the Year ===
Year	Player	Team
2020	Pernille Harder (DEN)	(Germany) Wolfsburg (England) Chelsea
2021	Alexia Putellas (SPA)	(Spain) Barcelona
2022	Beth Mead (ENG)	(England) Arsenal
2023	Aitana Bonmatí (ESP)	(Spain) Barcelona
2024	Aitana Bonmatí (ESP)	(Spain) Barcelona
2025	Mariona Caldentey (ESP)	(England) Arsenal

=== Women's World Manager of the Year ===
Year	Player	Team
2020	Jean-Luc Vasseur (FRA)	Lyon
2021	Lluís Cortés (ESP)	Barcelona
2022	Sarina Wiegman (NED)	England
2023	Sarina Wiegman (NED)	England
2024	Emma Hayes (ENG)	Chelsea/USA
2025	Sarina Wiegman (NED)	England

=== Women's World Team of the Year ===
Year	Club
2020	Lyon (FRA)
2021	Barcelona (ESP)
2022	England (ENG)
2023	Spain (ESP)
2024	Barcelona (ESP)
2025	England (ENG)

=== Referee of the Year ===
Year	Rank	Referee	Points
2005	1st	(Italy) Pierluigi Collina	30.6%
2005	2nd	(Denmark) Kim Milton Nielsen	19.7%
2005	3rd	(Germany) Markus Merk	16.3%
2006	1st	(Argentina) Horacio Elizondo	38.7%
2006	2nd	(Mexico) Benito Archundia	30.5%
2006	3rd	(Slovakia) Ľuboš Micheľ	8.5%

== Greatest XI of All Time ==
This list, published July 2013, is based on a voting poll of 74 experts from around the world: journalists; TV pundits; then-current and former players; and then-current and former managers.

Goalkeeper	Defenders	Midfielders	Forwards
Lev Yashin (URS)	Cafu (BRA); Franz Beckenbauer (GER); Bobby Moore (ENG); Paolo Maldini (ITA)	Alfredo Di Stéfano (ARG); Zinedine Zidane (FRA); Diego Maradona (ARG); Johan Cruyff (NED)	Lionel Messi (ARG); Pelé (BRA)

=== Goalkeepers ===
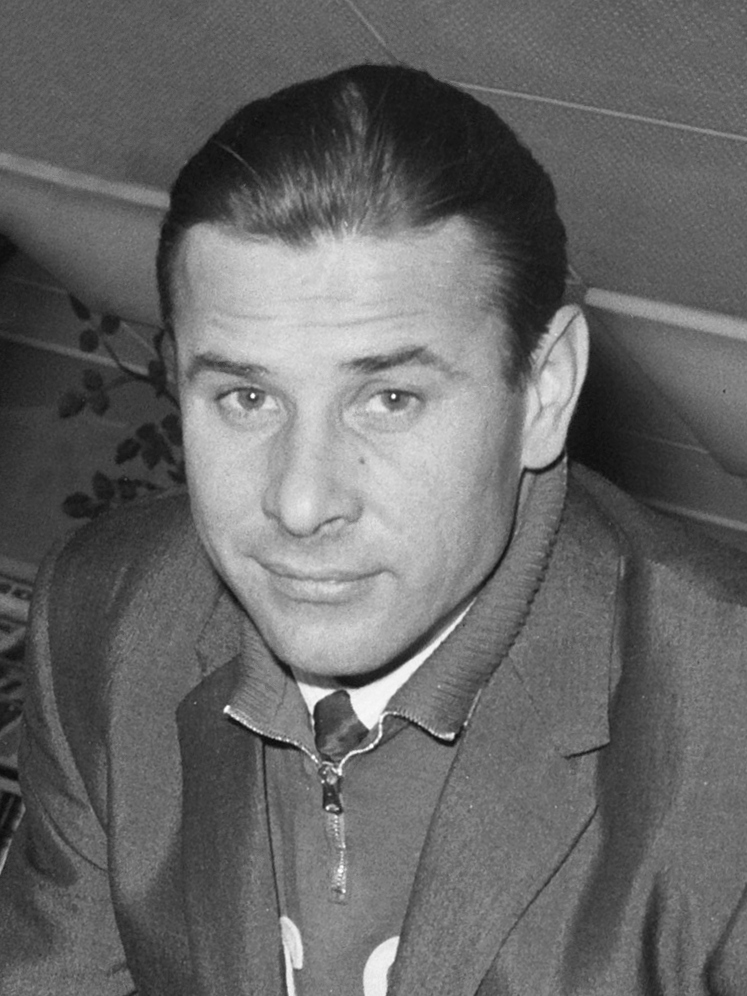
Lev Yashin

Pos.	Name	Votes	% of votes
1	Lev Yashin (URS)	31	41.89%
2	Gordon Banks (ENG)	6	8.11%
2	Dino Zoff (ITA)	6	8.11%
4	Gianluigi Buffon (ITA)	5	6.76%
4	Peter Schmeichel (DEN)	5	6.76%
6	Iker Casillas (ESP)	4	5.41%
7	Sepp Maier (GER)	3	4.05%
8	Pat Jennings (NIR)	2	2.70%
8	Oliver Kahn (GER)	2	2.70%
8	Edwin van der Sar (NED)	2	2.70%

=== Full backs ===
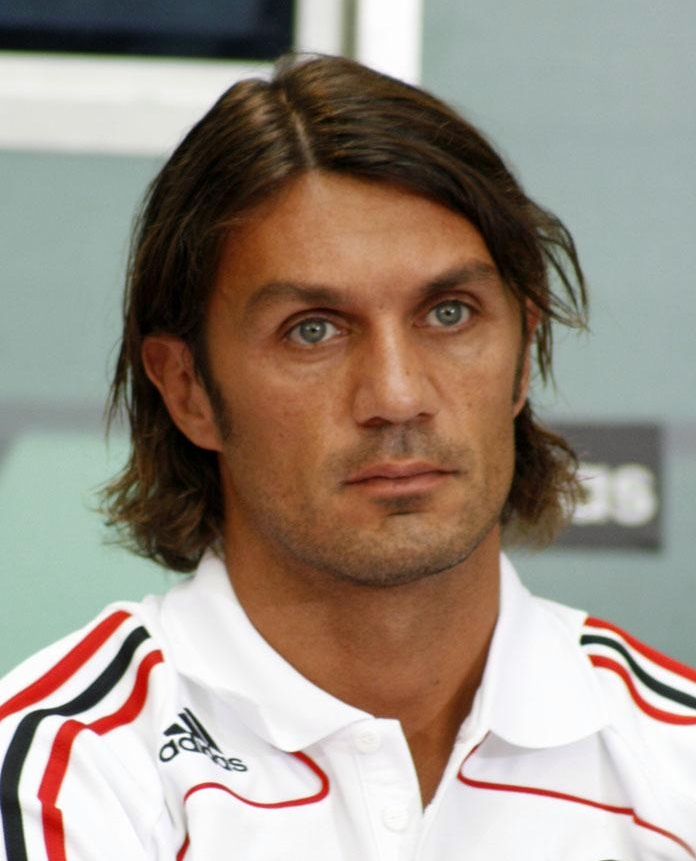
Paolo Maldini

Pos.	Name	Votes	% of votes
1	Paolo Maldini (ITA)	48	64.86%
2	Cafu (BRA)	24	32.43%
3	Carlos Alberto Torres (BRA)	18	24.32%
4	Roberto Carlos (BRA)	13	17.57%
5	Djalma Santos (BRA)	11	14.86%
6	Giacinto Facchetti (ITA)	7	9.46%
7	Nílton Santos (BRA)	6	8.11%
8	Berti Vogts (GER)	4	5.41%
9	Lilian Thuram (FRA)	3	4.05%
10	Ruud Krol (NED)	2	2.70%
10	Víctor Rodríguez Andrade (URU)	2	2.70%
10	Karl-Heinz Schnellinger (GER)	2	2.70%

=== Central defenders ===
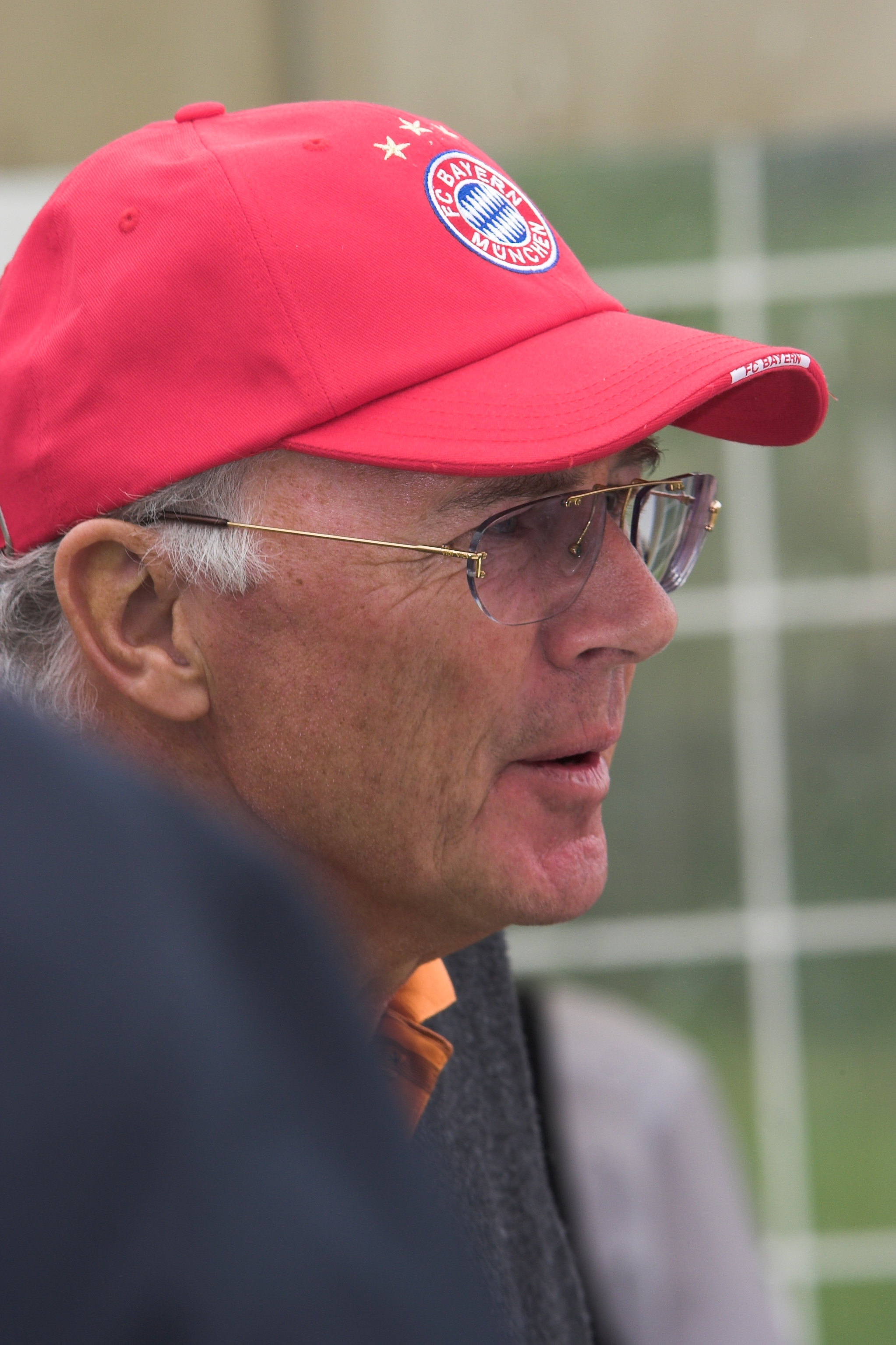
Franz Beckenbauer

Pos.	Name	Votes	% of votes
1	Franz Beckenbauer (GER)	68	91.89%
2	Bobby Moore (ENG)	23	31.08%
3	Franco Baresi (ITA)	22	29.73%
4	Daniel Passarella (ARG)	4	5.41%
5	Fabio Cannavaro (ITA)	3	4.05%
5	John Charles (WAL)	3	4.05%
5	Marcel Desailly (FRA)	3	4.05%
5	Paul McGrath (IRE)	3	4.05%
9	Giuseppe Bergomi (ITA)	2	2.70%

=== Midfielders ===
Pos.	Name	Votes	% of votes
1	Diego Maradona (ARG)	64	86.49%
2	Johan Cruyff (NED)	58	78.38%
3	Zinedine Zidane (FRA)	28	37.84%
4	Alfredo Di Stéfano (ARG)	24	32.43%
5	Michel Platini (FRA)	18	24.32%
6	Garrincha (BRA)	15	20.27%
7	George Best (NIR)	12	16.22%
8	Cristiano Ronaldo (POR)	7	9.46%
9	Bobby Charlton (ENG)	5	6.76%
9	Lothar Matthäus (GER)	5	6.76%
11	Andrés Iniesta (ESP)	4	5.41%
11	Xavi (ESP)	4	5.41%
13	Didi (BRA)	3	4.05%
13	Sócrates (BRA)	3	4.05%
15	Roberto Baggio (ITA)	2	2.70%
15	Toninho Cerezo (BRA)	2	2.70%
15	Francisco Gento (ESP)	2	2.70%
15	Ryan Giggs (WAL)	2	2.70%
15	Stanley Matthews (ENG)	2	2.70%
15	Johan Neeskens (NED)	2	2.70%
15	Rivellino (BRA)	2	2.70%
15	Zico (BRA)	2	2.70%

=== Strikers ===
Pos.	Name	Votes	% of votes
1	Pelé (BRA)	56	75.68%
2	Lionel Messi (ARG)	46	62.16%
3	Ferenc Puskas (HUN)	11	14.86%
4	Ronaldo (BRA)	9	12.16%
5	Marco van Basten (NED)	5	6.76%
6	Gerd Müller (GER)	4	5.41%
7	Oleh Blokhin (URS)	2	2.70%
7	Eusébio (POR)	2	2.70%

== Greatest Managers of All Time ==
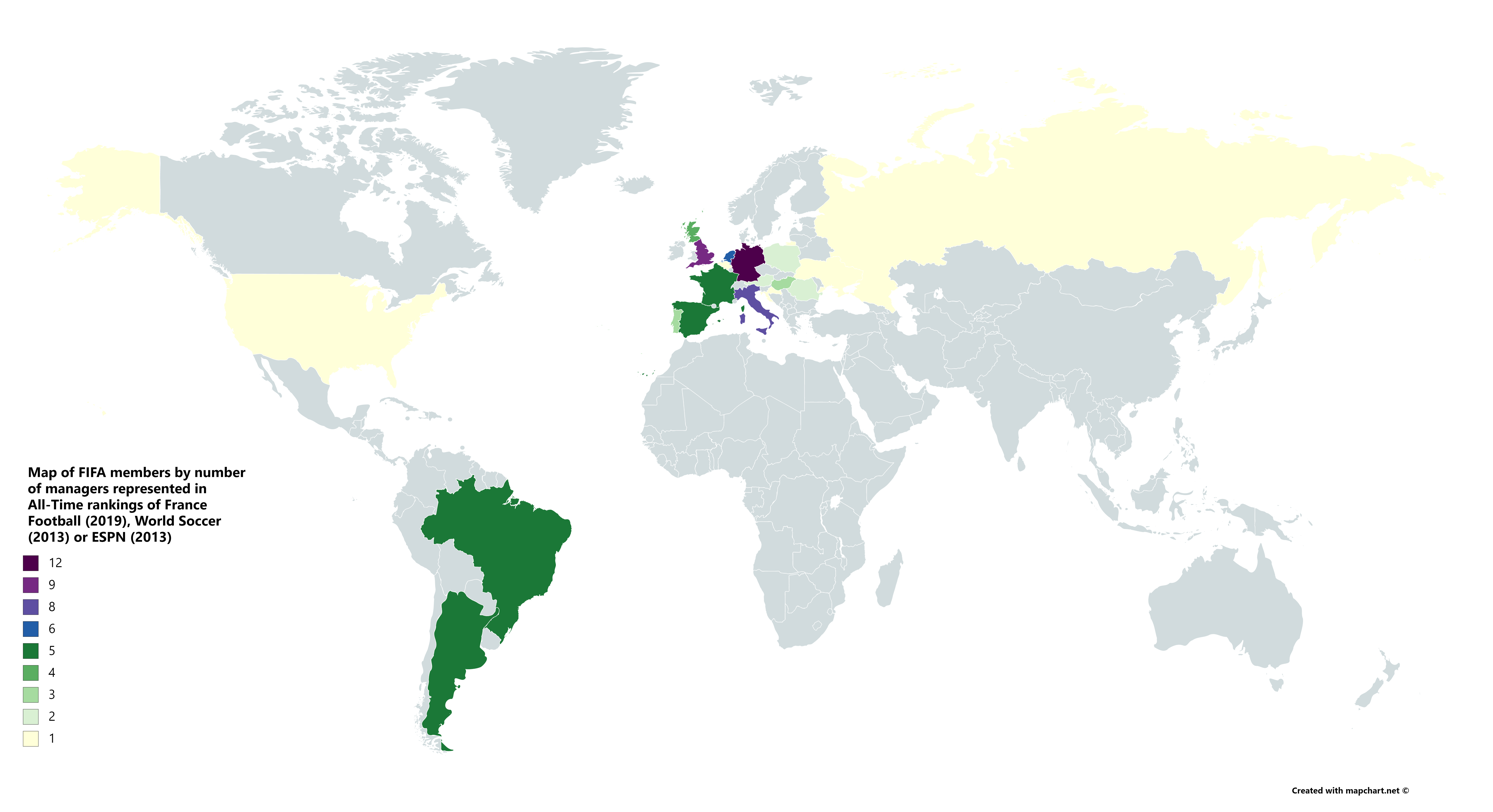
Map of FIFA members by number of managers ranked by France Football (2019), World Soccer (2013) or ESPN (2013)

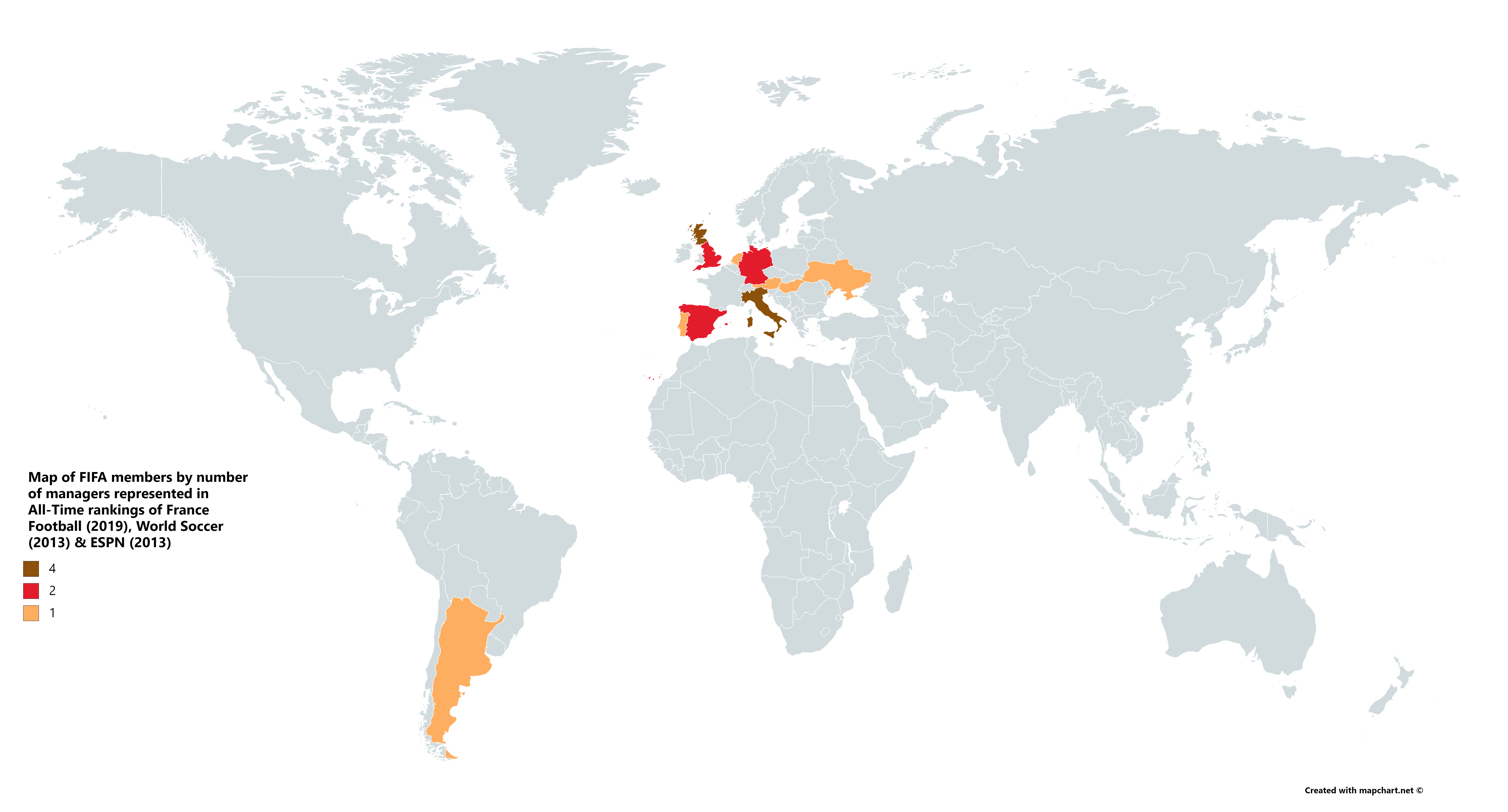
Map of FIFA members by number of managers ranked by France Football (2019), World Soccer (2013) and ESPN (2013)

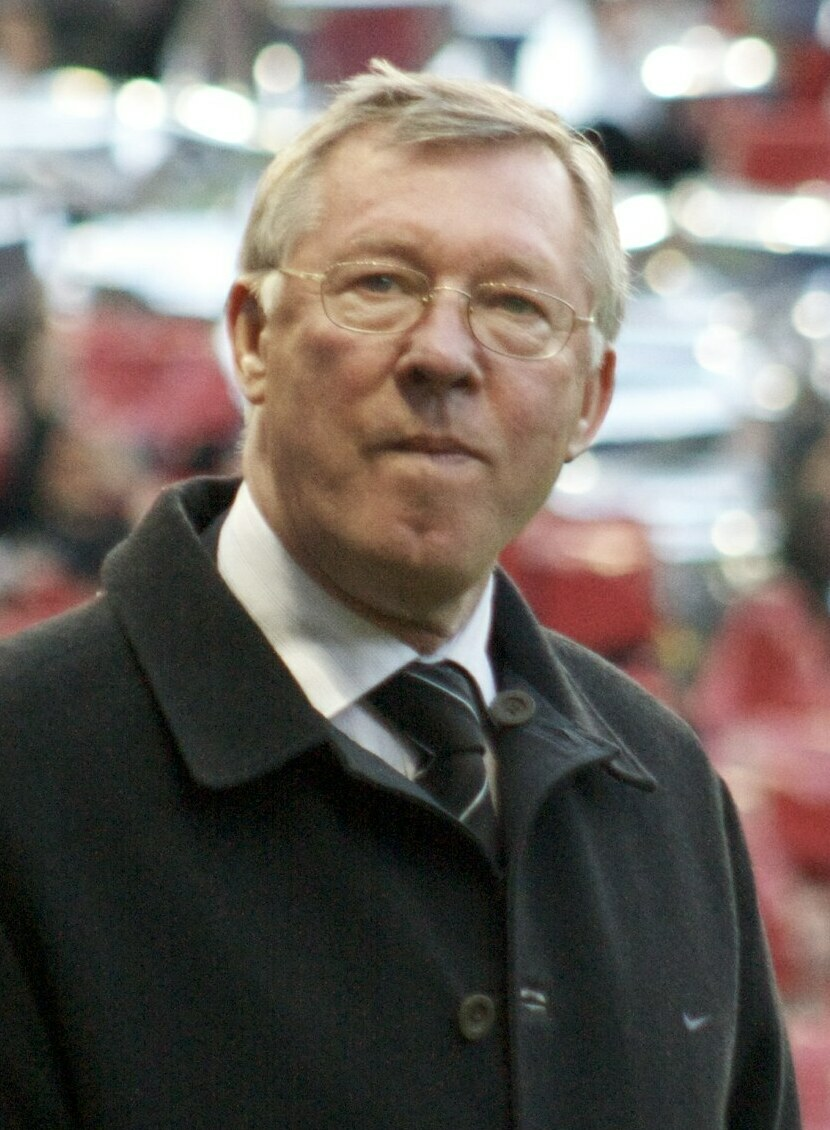
Alex Ferguson

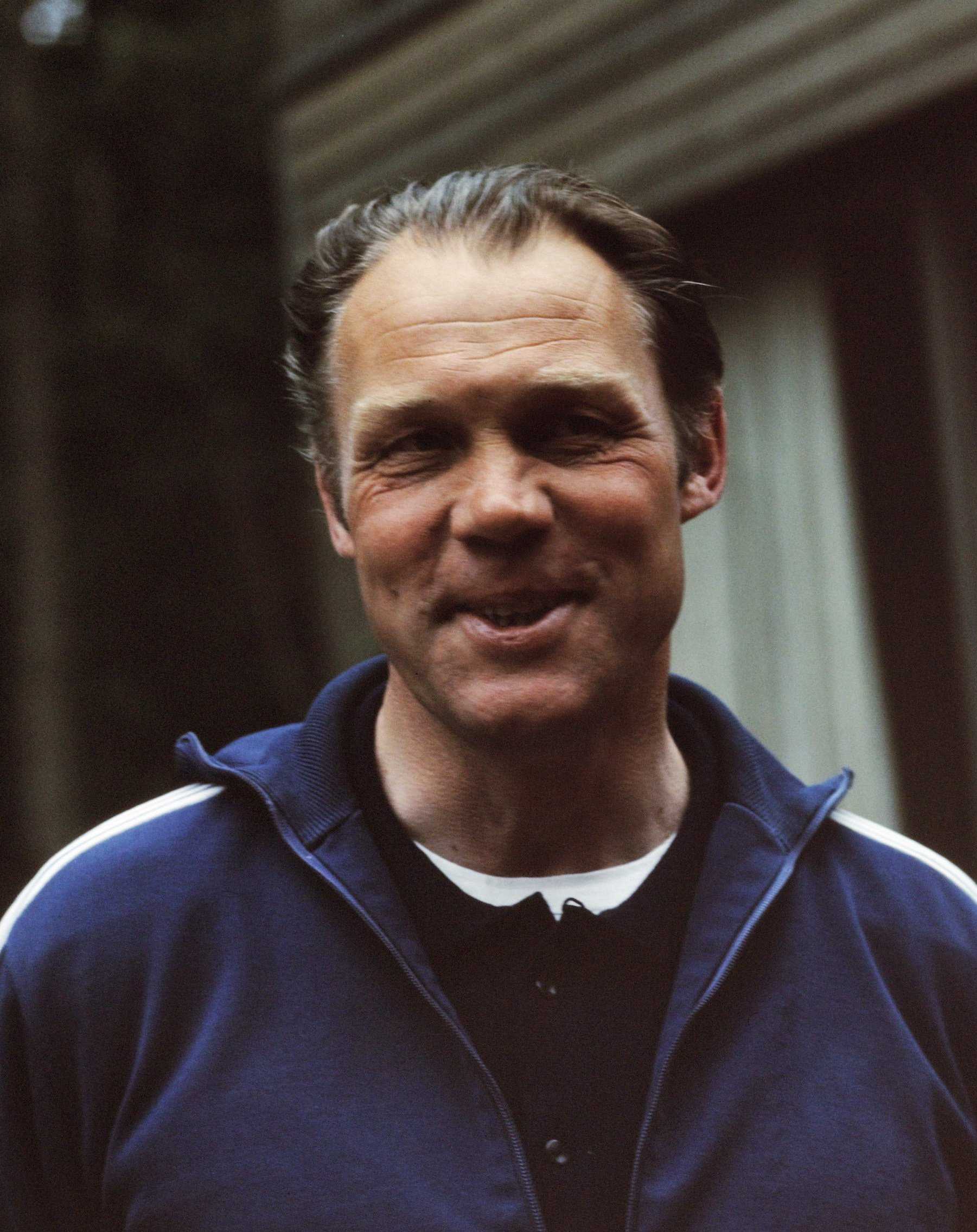
Rinus Michels

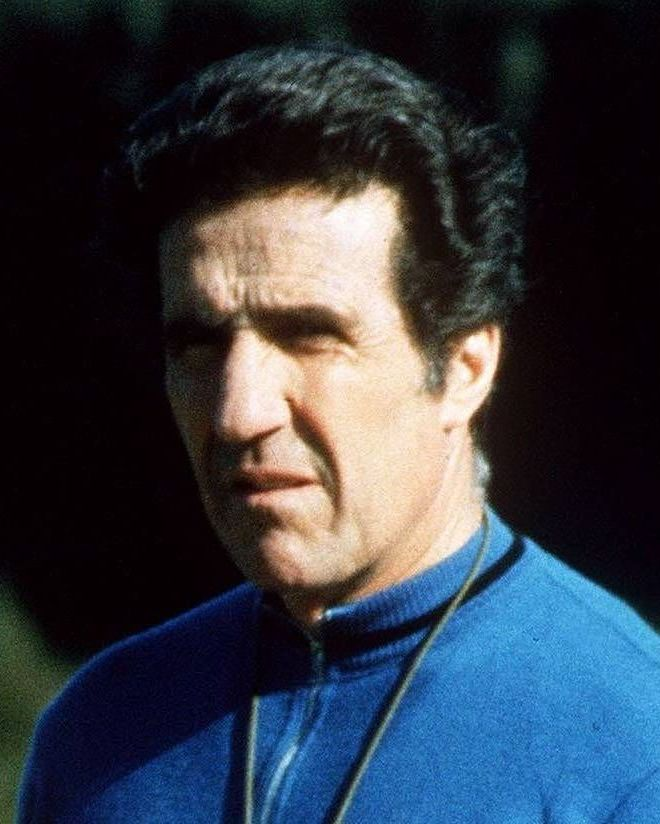
Helenio Herrera

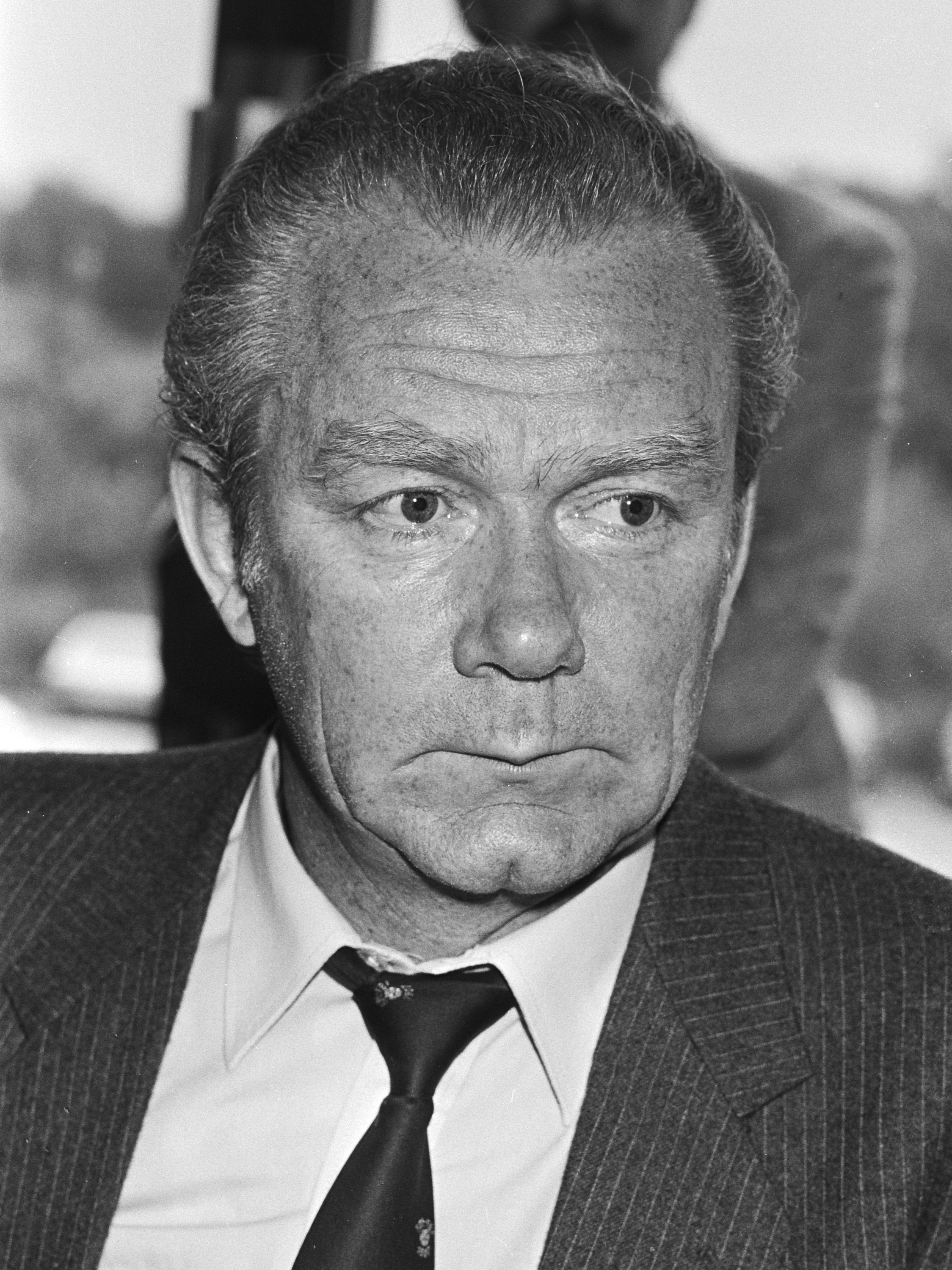
Valeriy Lobanovskyi

The list is based on the voting poll consisting of 74 experts (journalists, TV pundits, current and former players and managers) from around the world with each having been allotted 5 managerial picks.

(Published July 2013)

Key

Managers in bold are ranked by World Soccer, France Football and ESPN
Managers ranked top 10 by World Soccer, France Football and ESPN

Pos.	Name	Years	Notable teams	Votes	% of votes
1	**Alex Ferguson** (SCO)	1974–2013	Aberdeen, Scotland national team, Manchester United	49	66.22%
2	**Rinus Michels** (NED)	1960–1992	AFC Ajax, Barcelona, Netherlands national team	46	62.16%
3	**José Mourinho** (POR)	2000–	Porto, Chelsea, Inter Milan, Real Madrid, Manchester United, Tottenham, Roma	21	28.38%
4	**Helenio Herrera** (ARG)	1944–1970, 1973–1981	Sevilla, Atlético Madrid, Barcelona, Inter Milan	19	25.68%
5	**Pep Guardiola** (ESP)	2007–	Barcelona, Bayern Munich, Manchester City	18	24.32%
6	**Arrigo Sacchi** (ITA)	1985–1999, 2001	Parma, Milan, Italy national team, Atlético Madrid	15	20.27%
7	**Valeriy Lobanovskyi** (UKR)	1969–2002	Dnipro, Dynamo Kyiv, Soviet Union national team, Ukraine national team	14	18.92%
8	**Bob Paisley** (ENG)	1974–1983	Liverpool	12	16.22%
9	Herbert Chapman (ENG)	1907–1918, 1921–1934	Northampton Town, Leeds City, Huddersfield Town, Arsenal	9	12.16%
9	**Béla Guttmann** (HUN)	1933–1939, 1945–1951, 1953–1962, 1964–1967, 1973	Milan, São Paulo, Porto, Benfica, Peñarol	9	12.16%
9	**Ernst Happel** (AUT)	1962–1992	Feyenoord, Sevilla, Netherlands national team, Brugge, Hamburger SV	9	12.16%
9	Mário Zagallo (BRA)	1966–1991, 1994–2001	Botafogo, Flamengo, Brazil national team, Vasco da Gama	9	12.16%
13	Vittorio Pozzo (ITA)	1912–1922, 1924–1926, 1929–1948	Italy national team, Torino, Milan	8	10.81%
13	**Vicente del Bosque** (ESP)	1987–1990, 1994, 1996, 1999–2005, 2008–2016	Real Madrid, Beşiktaş, Spain national team	8	10.81%
13	**Marcello Lippi** (ITA)	1982–2006, 2008–2010, 2012–2014, 2016–2019	Napoli, Juventus, Inter Milan, Italy national team, Guangzhou Evergrande, China national team	8	10.81%
13	Telê Santana (BRA)	1969–1996	Atlético Mineiro, Palmeiras, São Paulo, Botafogo, Flamengo, Brazil national team	8	10.81%
17	**Brian Clough** (ENG)	1965–1993	Derby County, Leeds United, Nottingham Forest	7	9.46%
18	**Ottmar Hitzfeld** (GER)	1983–2004, 2007–2014	Borussia Dortmund, Bayern Munich, Switzerland national team	6	8.11%
19	Sepp Herberger (GER)	1930–1942, 1945–1946, 1950–1964	Germany national team, Eintracht Frankfurt	5	6.76%
19	**Bill Shankly** (SCO)	1949–1974	Carlisle United, Huddersfield Town, Liverpool	5	6.76%
19	**Giovanni Trapattoni** (ITA)	1974–2013	Milan, Inter Milan, Juventus, Bayern Munich, Fiorentina, Italy national team	5	6.76%
22	César Luis Menotti (ARG)	1970, 1972–1984, 1986–1994, 1996–1999, 2002, 2004, 2006, 2007	Argentina national team, Barcelona, Atlético Madrid, Boca Juniors, Independiente	4	5.41%
23	Enzo Bearzot (ITA)	1964–1986	Italy national team	3	4.05%
23	Jimmy Hogan (ENG)	1910–1912, 1914–1921, 1924, 1924–1927, 1931–1939	MTK Budapest, Netherlands national team, Fulham, Aston Villa	3	4.05%
23	Hennes Weisweiler (GER)	1948–1983	Borussia Mönchengladbach, Barcelona, 1. FC Köln	3	4.05%
23	Helmut Schön (GER)	1952–1984	Germany national team	3	4.05%
23	**Fabio Capello** (ITA)	1991–2015, 2017–2018	Milan, Real Madrid, Roma, Juventus, England national team	3	4.05%
28	Franz Beckenbauer (GER)	1984–1991, 1993–1994, 1996	Germany national team, Bayern Munich, Marseille	2	2.70%
28	Carlos Bilardo (ARG)	1971, 1973–1993, 1996, 1998–2000, 2003–2004	Estudiantes, Colombia national team, Argentina national team, Sevilla, Boca Juniors	2	2.70%
28	Johan Cruyff (NED)	1985–1996	AFC Ajax, Barcelona	2	2.70%
28	Vicente Feola (BRA)	1937–1942, 1947–1950, 1955–1956, 1958, 1959, 1961, 1966	São Paulo, Brazil national team, Boca Juniors	2	2.70%
28	Alf Ramsey (ENG)	1955–1974, 1977–1978	Ipswich Town, England national team	2	2.70%
28	Gusztáv Sebes (HUN)	1940–1946, 1949–1957	Hungary national team	2	2.70%
28	**Jock Stein** (SCO)	1960–1985	Celtic Glasgow, Scotland national team, Leeds United	2	2.70%
28	Luiz Felipe Scolari (BRA)	1982–2019	Brazil national team, Portugal national team, Grêmio, Palmeiras, Chelsea	2	2.70%
36	Luis Aragonés (ESP)	1974–2009	Atletico Madrid, Real Betis, Barcelona, Sevilla, Spain national team	1	1.35%
36	Leo Beenhakker (NED)	1965–	AFC Ajax, Netherlands national team, Real Madrid, Feyenoord	1	1.35%
36	Rafael Benítez (ESP)	1993–	Valencia, Liverpool, Internazionale, Chelsea, Napoli, Real Madrid, Newcastle United	1	1.35%
36	Marcelo Bielsa (ARG)	1990–	Newell's Old Boys, América, Vélez Sarsfield, Argentina, Chile, Athletic Bilbao, Marseille, Leeds United	1	1.35%
36	Bob Bradley (USA)	1981–	Chicago Fire, MetroStars, United States national team, Egypt national team, Los Angeles FC	1	1.35%
36	**Matt Busby** (SCO)	1945–1969, 1970–1971	Manchester United	1	1.35%
36	Jack Charlton (ENG)	1973–1996	Middlesbrough, Sheffield Wednesday, Newcastle United, Republic of Ireland national team	1	1.35%
36	Kazimierz Górski (POL)	1959–1985	Legia Warsaw, Poland national team, Panathinaikos, Olympiacos	1	1.35%
36	Jupp Heynckes (GER)	1979–2018	Borussia Mönchengladbach, Bayern Munich, Real Madrid, Benfica, Schalke	1	1.35%
36	Gérard Houllier (FRA)	1973–2011	Paris Saint-Germain, France national team, Liverpool, Lyon	1	1.35%
36	Tomislav Ivić (CRO)	1967–2004	Hajduk Split, Dinamo Zagreb, Croatia national team, Ajax, Anderlecht, Standard Liège, Galatasaray, Fenerbahçe, Panathinaikos, Porto, Benfica, Paris Saint-Germain, Atlético Madrid, Marseille	1	1.35%
36	Ștefan Kovács (ROM)	1952–1987	Steaua București, Ajax, France national team, Romania national team, Panathinaikos, Monaco	1	1.35%
36	**Udo Lattek** (GER)	1970–2000	Bayern Munich, Borussia Mönchengladbach, Barcelona	1	1.35%
36	Hugo Meisl (AUT)	1912–14, 1919–37	Austria national team	1	1.35%
36	Otto Rehhagel (GER)	1972–2010, 2012	Fortuna Düsseldorf, Werder Bremen, Bayern Munich, 1. FC Kaiserslautern, Greece national team	1	1.35%
36	Carlos Alberto Parreira (BRA)	1968–2010	Fluminense, Brazil national team, Valencia, Fenerbahçe, Corinthians, South Africa national team	1	1.35%
36	Antoni Piechniczek (POL)	1973–1990, 1993–1997	Polish national team	1	1.35%
36	Nereo Rocco (ITA)	1947–1977	Padova, Milan	1	1.35%
36	Árpád Weisz (HUN)	1926–1940	Internazionale, Bologna	1	1.35%
36	Arsène Wenger (FRA)	1984–2018	Monaco, Nagoya Grampus Eight, Arsenal	1	1.35%
36	Walter Winterbottom (ENG)	1946–1962	England national team	1	1.35%

== Greatest Players of the 20th century ==
In the December 1999 issue, a readers' poll listing the 100 greatest football players of the 20th century was published.

#	Player
1	(Brazil) Pelé
2	(Argentina) Diego Maradona
3	(Netherlands) Johan Cruyff
4	(Germany) Franz Beckenbauer
5	(France) Michel Platini
6	(Argentina) (Spain) Alfredo Di Stéfano
7	(Hungary) (Spain) Ferenc Puskás
8	(Northern Ireland) George Best
9	(Netherlands) Marco van Basten
10	(Portugal) Eusébio
11	(Soviet Union) Lev Yashin
12	(England) Bobby Charlton
13	(Brazil) Ronaldo
14	(England) Bobby Moore
15	(Germany) Gerd Müller
16	(Italy) Roberto Baggio
17	(England) Stanley Matthews
18	(Brazil) Zico
19	(Italy) Franco Baresi
20	(Brazil) Garrincha
21	(Italy) Paolo Maldini
22	(Scotland) Kenny Dalglish
23	(Argentina) Gabriel Batistuta
24	(France) Eric Cantona
25	(Romania) Gheorghe Hagi

#	Player
26	(Brazil) Romário
27	(Brazil) Jairzinho
28	(France) Zinedine Zidane
29	(Netherlands) Ruud Gullit
30	(Wales) John Charles
31	(Germany) Lothar Matthäus
32	(England) Gordon Banks
33	(Germany) Jürgen Klinsmann
34	(Netherlands) Dennis Bergkamp
35	(Germany) Karl-Heinz Rummenigge
36	(England) Gary Lineker
37	(Italy) Giuseppe Meazza
38	(Brazil) Rivellino
39	(Brazil) Didi
40	(Wales) Ian Rush
41	(Denmark) Peter Schmeichel
41	(Italy) Paolo Rossi
43	(Liberia) George Weah
44	(England) Michael Owen
45	(France) Just Fontaine
46	(England) Duncan Edwards
47	(Italy) Dino Zoff
48	(Bulgaria) Hristo Stoichkov
49	(England) David Beckham
50	(England) Tom Finney

#	Player
51	(Brazil) Rivaldo
52	(Argentina) Claudio Caniggia
53	(Brazil) Tostão
54	(Netherlands) Frank Rijkaard
55	(Paraguay) José Luis Chilavert
56	(England) Kevin Keegan
57	(England) Paul Gascoigne
58	(Cameroon) Roger Milla
59	(Denmark) Michael Laudrup
60	(Ukraine) Andriy Shevchenko
61	(France) David Ginola
61	(England) Glenn Hoddle
61	(Brazil) Sócrates
64	(Brazil) Roberto Carlos
64	(England) Alan Shearer
66	(Argentina) Daniel Passarella
67	(Croatia) Davor Šuker
68	(England) Dixie Dean
68	(Hungary) Sándor Kocsis
68	(Uruguay) Juan Alberto Schiaffino
68	(Italy) Christian Vieri
72	(Argentina) Mario Kempes
72	(Netherlands) Johan Neeskens
72	(Italy) Luigi Riva
75	(Uruguay) José Nasazzi
75	(Germany) Günter Netzer

#	Player
77	(Italy) Alessandro Del Piero
77	(Colombia) Carlos Valderrama
79	(Spain) Ricardo Zamora
80	(Uruguay) Enzo Francescoli
81	(Netherlands) Edgar Davids
81	(Spain) Francisco Gento
83	(Scotland) Jim Baxter
83	(Brazil) Falcão
83	(Wales) Ryan Giggs
83	(Germany) Sepp Maier
87	(Poland) Zbigniew Boniek
87	(Northern Ireland) Pat Jennings
87	(Hungary) György Sárosi
90	(Italy) Giacinto Facchetti
91	(Scotland) Alan Hansen
91	(France) Raymond Kopa
91	(England) Bryan Robson
91	(East Germany) (Germany) Matthias Sammer
95	(Hungary) (Spain) Ladislao Kubala
95	(Wales) Neville Southall
97	(Brazil) Gérson
98	(Portugal) Paulo Futre
98	(Denmark) Preben Elkjær
100	(Brazil) Bebeto

== World Player of the Decade 2000s ==
In 2009, a World Player of the Decade was announced based on the reader's votes from 2000 to 2009 in the annual Player of the Year polls.

World Player of the Decade 2000s

No.	Player	Points
1	(Brazil) Ronaldinho	781
2	(Argentina) Lionel Messi	759
3	(Portugal) Cristiano Ronaldo	708
4	(France) Thierry Henry	619
5	(Brazil) Kaká	567
6	(Italy) Fabio Cannavaro	401
7	(Czech Republic) Pavel Nedvěd	394
8	(England) Michael Owen	330
9	(Portugal) Luís Figo	290
10	(France) Zinedine Zidane	270
11	(Spain) Raúl	261
12	(Brazil) Ronaldo	260
13	(Ukraine) Andriy Shevchenko	230
14	(Spain) Andrés Iniesta	215
15	(Germany) Michael Ballack	180
16	(Spain) Xavi	163
17	(Brazil) Rivaldo	150
18	(Spain) Fernando Torres	149
19	(Cameroon) Samuel Eto'o	146
19	(England) Frank Lampard	146

No.	Player	Points
21	(England) Steven Gerrard	134
22	(Portugal) Deco	130
23	(Italy) Francesco Totti	107
24	(Netherlands) Ruud van Nistelrooy	99
25	(Germany) Oliver Kahn	90
26	(Italy) Paolo Maldini	82
27	(Ivory Coast) Didier Drogba	79
28	(Argentina) Juan Román Riquelme	77
29	(Brazil) Adriano	73
30	(Spain) Iker Casillas	59
31	(Russia) Andrey Arshavin	54
32	(Sweden) Zlatan Ibrahimović	53
33	(Italy) Gianluigi Buffon	49
34	(Spain) David Villa	46
35	(Netherlands) Roy Makaay	40
36	(England) David Beckham	37
37	(England) Wayne Rooney	36
38	(Uruguay) Diego Forlán	21
39	(Argentina) Gabriel Batistuta	20
39	(Sweden) Henrik Larsson	20

== Eric Batty's World XI ==
Since the first year of publication of World Soccer and over a 30-year period, overseas editor Eric Batty published his team selection of the best players over the season.

Eric Batty's World XI
Year	Goalkeeper	Defenders	Midfielders	Forwards
1960	Gyula Grosics (HUN)	Orvar Bergmark (SWE); José Santamaría (ESP); Nílton Santos (BRA)	Martí Vergés (ESP); Julinho (BRA); Ante Žanetić (YUG); Francisco Gento (ESP)	Pelé (BRA); Alfredo Di Stéfano (ESP); Ferenc Puskás (HUN)
1961	(Hungary) Gyula Grosics	(Sweden) Orvar Bergmark; Germano (POR) (Brazil) Nílton Santos	Danny Blanchflower (NIR); Paul Bonga Bonga (DRC) (Spain) Francisco Gento	László Kubala (ESP) (Brazil) Pelé (Spain) Alfredo Di Stéfano (Hungary) Ferenc Puskás
1962	Gernot Fraydl (AUT)	Djalma Santos (BRA) (Portugal) Germano; Fahrudin Jusufi (YUG)	Zito (BRA); Josef Masopust (TCH) (Spain) Francisco Gento	Garrincha (BRA) (Brazil) Pelé (Spain) Alfredo Di Stéfano (Hungary) Ferenc Puskás
1963	Lev Yashin (URS)	(Brazil) Djalma Santos; Cesare Maldini (ITA) (Socialist Federal Republic of Yugoslavia) Fahrudin Jusufi	Mário Coluna (POR); Raymond Kopa (FRA); Jim Baxter (SCO); Luis Suárez (ESP)	(Brazil) Pelé (Spain) Alfredo Di Stéfano (Spain) Ferenc Puskás
1964	(Soviet Union) Lev Yashin	Tarcisio Burgnich (ITA); Ján Popluhár (TCH); Giacinto Facchetti (ITA)	(Portugal) Mário Coluna; José Augusto (POR) (Czechoslovakia) Josef Masopust (Spain) Luis Suárez	(Brazil) Pelé (Spain) Alfredo Di Stéfano; Denis Law (SCO)
1965	Costa Pereira (POR)	(Brazil) Djalma Santos (Portugal) Germano (Italy) Giacinto Facchetti; Orlando (BRA)	(Portugal) Mário Coluna (Portugal) José Augusto (Spain) Luis Suárez	Sandro Mazzola (ITA); Eusébio (POR) (Brazil) Pelé
1966	(Soviet Union) Lev Yashin	Aleksandar Shalamanov (BUL); Franz Beckenbauer (FRG) (Italy) Giacinto Facchetti	Néstor Gonçalves (URU); Dimitar Yakimov (BUL) (Portugal) Mário Coluna; Mario Corso (ITA)	(Brazil) Pelé; Ferenc Bene (HUN); János Farkas (HUN)
1967	(Soviet Union) Lev Yashin	(Portugal) Mário Coluna (Czechoslovakia) Ján Popluhár (Italy) Giacinto Facchetti	(West Germany) Franz Beckenbauer; Kálmán Mészöly (HUN) (Bulgaria) Dimitar Yakimov	(Italy) Sandro Mazzola (Hungary) Ferenc Bene; Geoff Hurst (ENG) (Hungary) János Farkas
1968	Dino Zoff (ITA)	(Socialist Federal Republic of Yugoslavia) Fahrudin Jusufi (Czechoslovakia) Ján Popluhár (Italy) Giacinto Facchetti	(West Germany) Franz Beckenbauer; Martin Peters (ENG); Bobby Moore (ENG)	(Hungary) Ferenc Bene (Italy) Sandro Mazzola (England) Geoff Hurst; Włodzimierz Lubański (POL)
1969	Gordon Banks (ENG)	Karl-Heinz Schnellinger (FRG) (West Germany) Franz Beckenbauer (Italy) Giacinto Facchetti	(England) Martin Peters (England) Bobby Moore; Dragan Džajić (YUG)	(Hungary) Ferenc Bene (England) Geoff Hurst; Gerd Müller (FRG) (Poland) Włodzimierz Lubański
1970	did not publish			
1971	(England) Gordon Banks	Carlos Alberto (BRA) (West Germany) Franz Beckenbauer (England) Bobby Moore; Berti Vogts (FRG)	(Italy) Sandro Mazzola; Gérson (BRA); Rivellino (BRA)	Jairzinho (BRA) (West Germany) Gerd Müller; Gigi Riva (ITA)
1972	(England) Gordon Banks	Paul Breitner (FRG) (England) Bobby Moore; Hans-Georg Schwarzenbeck (FRG); Karol Dobiaš (TCH)	Günter Netzer (FRG) (West Germany) Franz Beckenbauer	(Poland) Włodzimierz Lubański (West Germany) Gerd Müller; Johan Cruyff (NED) (Brazil) Jairzinho
1973	Pat Jennings (NIR)	Dragoslav Stepanović (YUG) (England) Bobby Moore; Barry Hulshoff (NED); Petar Krivokuća (YUG)	Ladislav Kuna (TCH) (West Germany) Günter Netzer (West Germany) Franz Beckenbauer	(Socialist Federal Republic of Yugoslavia) Dragan Džajić (West Germany) Gerd Müller (Poland) Włodzimierz Lubański
1974	David Harvey (SCO)	(West Germany) Paul Breitner (West Germany) Franz Beckenbauer; Luís Pereira (BRA); Rolando García (CHI)	Jovan Aćimović (YUG); Kazimierz Deyna (POL) (Italy) Sandro Mazzola	Robert Gadocha (POL) (West Germany) Gerd Müller; Grzegorz Lato (POL)
1975	(Italy) Dino Zoff	Rainer Bonhof (FRG); Colin Todd (ENG); Humberto Coelho (POR) (West Germany) Berti Vogts	(West Germany) Paul Breitner (West Germany) Günter Netzer (West Germany) Franz Beckenbauer	Jupp Heynckes (FRG); Ralf Edström (SWE) (Poland) Grzegorz Lato
1976	Ivo Viktor (TCH)	(West Germany) Paul Breitner (West Germany) Franz Beckenbauer; Anton Ondruš (TCH) (England) Colin Todd	Branko Oblak (YUG); Viktor Kolotov (URS); Antonín Panenka (TCH)	Oleg Blokhin (URS) (West Germany) Gerd Müller; Ruud Geels (NED)
1977	Sepp Maier (FRG)	Ruud Krol (NED) (Brazil) Luís Pereira (West Germany) Franz Beckenbauer (West Germany) Berti Vogts	(Netherlands) Johan Cruyff (West Germany) Rainer Bonhof; Jan Peters (NED)	Rob Rensenbrink (NED) (West Germany) Gerd Müller; Franco Causio (ITA)
1978	Peter Shilton (ENG)	Alberto Tarantini (ARG) (Brazil) Luís Pereira; David Watson (ENG) (Netherlands) Ruud Krol	Teófilo Cubillas (PER); Osvaldo Ardiles (ARG)	(Netherlands) Rob Rensenbrink; Roberto Bettega (ITA) (West Germany) Gerd Müller (Italy) Franco Causio
1979	did not publish			
1980	did not publish			
1981	did not publish			
1982	(England) Peter Shilton	Alain Giresse (FRA); Jaime Duarte (PER); Daniel Passarella (ARG); Marius Trésor (FRA)	Sócrates (BRA) (Argentina) Osvaldo Ardiles; Michel Platini (FRA); Falcão (BRA)	Paolo Rossi (ITA); Karl-Heinz Rummenigge (FRG)
1983	(England) Peter Shilton	(France) Alain Giresse (Argentina) Daniel Passarella (France) Marius Trésor (Peru) Jaime Duarte	(Brazil) Sócrates (Argentina) Osvaldo Ardiles; Toninho Cerezo (BRA) (France) Michel Platini (Brazil) Falcão	(West Germany) Karl-Heinz Rummenigge
1984	Rinat Dasayev (URS)	(France) Alain Giresse; Morten Olsen (DEN); Maxime Bossis (FRA)	Allan Simonsen (DEN) (Brazil) Sócrates; Jean Tigana (FRA) (France) Michel Platini; Diego Maradona (ARG)	(West Germany) Karl-Heinz Rummenigge; Bruno Conti (ITA)
1985	(England) Peter Shilton	(Denmark) Morten Olsen; Antonio Maceda (ESP)	Ray Wilkins (ENG) (France) Jean Tigana (France) Alain Giresse; Carlos Manuel (POR) (France) Michel Platini; Søren Lerby (DEN); Khoren Oganesian (URS)	(West Germany) Karl-Heinz Rummenigge
1986	(Soviet Union) Rinat Dasayev	Manuel Amoros (FRA) (Denmark) Morten Olsen (Spain) Antonio Maceda (France) Maxime Bossis	Luis Fernández (FRA) (France) Jean Tigana; Frank Arnesen (DEN) (France) Alain Giresse; Míchel (ESP)	Gary Lineker (ENG)
1987	(Soviet Union) Rinat Dasayev	(France) Manuel Amoros; Celso (BRA); Glenn Hysén (SWE); Giovanni Francini (ITA)	(France) Luis Fernández (France) Jean Tigana (Argentina) Diego Maradona (Spain) Míchel	(England) Gary Lineker; Hugo Sánchez (MEX)
1988	did not publish			
1989	(England) Peter Shilton	Ronald Koeman (NED); Franco Baresi (ITA); Aron Winter (NED); Luis Carlos Perea (COL)	Frank Rijkaard (NED) (Spain) Míchel; Paulo Silas (BRA); Rafael Martín Vázquez (ESP)	Ruud Gullit (NED); Marco van Basten (NED)
1990	(England) Peter Shilton	Stéphane Demol (BEL) (Italy) Franco Baresi; Dunga (BRA); Riccardo Ferri (ITA)	(Brazil) Paulo Silas; Jan Ceulemans (BEL); Valdo (BRA) (Spain) Rafael Martín Vázquez	Ian Rush (WAL) (Netherlands) Marco van Basten
1991	Neville Southall (WAL)	(Italy) Riccardo Ferri; Laurent Blanc (FRA); Basile Boli (FRA)	Robert Prosinečki (YUG) (Brazil) Valdo (Brazil) Dunga (Spain) Rafael Martín Vázquez; Dejan Savićević (YUG)	(Wales) Mark Hughes (Socialist Federal Republic of Yugoslavia) Darko Pančev
1992	Peter Schmeichel (DEN)	(Netherlands) Ronald Koeman (France) Laurent Blanc; Mauro Silva (BRA); Des Walker (ENG)	(Netherlands) Frank Rijkaard; Brian Laudrup (DEN); Srečko Katanec (YUG)	Attilio Lombardo (ITA) (Netherlands) Marco van Basten; Bebeto (BRA)
World Soccer World XI
2012	(Spain) Iker Casillas	(Spain) Jordi Alba (Spain) Sergio Ramos (Belgium) Vincent Kompany (Germany) Philipp Lahm	(Spain) Andrés Iniesta (Italy) Andrea Pirlo (Spain) Xavi	(Portugal) Cristiano Ronaldo (Colombia) Radamel Falcao (Argentina) Lionel Messi

=== By player ===
Appearances	Player	First	Last
11	Franz Beckenbauer (FRG)	1966	1977
8	Gerd Müller (FRG)	1969	1978
7	Pelé (BRA)	1960	1966
6	Giacinto Facchetti (ITA)	1964	1969
6	Peter Shilton (ENG)	1978	1990
5	Alfredo Di Stéfano (ESP)	1960	1965
5	Mário Coluna (POR)	1963	1967
5	Sandro Mazzola (ITA)	1965	1974
5	Bobby Moore (ENG)	1968	1973
5	Alain Giresse (FRA)	1982	1986
4	(Hungary) Ferenc Puskás (ESP)	1960	1963
4	Lev Yashin (URS)	1963	1967
4	Ferenc Bene (HUN)	1966	1969
4	Włodzimierz Lubański (POL)	1968	1973
4	Paul Breitner (FRG)	1972	1976
4	Michel Platini (FRA)	1982	1985
4	Karl-Heinz Rummenigge (FRG)	1982	1985
4	Jean Tigana (FRA)	1984	1987
3	Francisco Gento (ESP)	1960	1962
3	Germano (POR)	1961	1965
3	Djalma Santos (BRA)	1962	1965
3	Fahrudin Jusufi (YUG)	1962	1968
3	Luis Suárez (ESP)	1963	1965
3	Ján Popluhár (TCH)	1964	1968
3	Geoff Hurst (ENG)	1967	1969
3	Gordon Banks (ENG)	1969	1972
3	Berti Vogts (FRG)	1971	1977
3	Günter Netzer (FRG)	1972	1975
3	Luís Pereira (BRA)	1974	1978
3	Osvaldo Ardiles (ARG)	1978	1983
3	Sócrates (BRA)	1982	1984
3	Morten Olsen (DEN)	1984	1986
3	Rinat Dasayev (URS)	1984	1987
3	Míchel (ESP)	1986	1989
3	Rafael Martín Vázquez (ESP)	1989	1991
3	Marco van Basten (NED)	1989	1992

== See also ==
- ESM Team of the Season
- FIFA 100
- FIFA Player of the Century
- FIFA World Cup Dream Team
- World Team of the 20th Century
