= Joris Six =

Joris Six C.I.C.M.
- Vicar Apostolic of Léopoldville
- Church: Catholic Church
- See: Apostolic Vicariate of Léopoldville
- In office: 26 February 1934 – 22 November 1952
- Predecessor: Noël de Cleene
- Successor: Félix Scalais
- Other post: Titular Bishop of Baliana (1934-1952)

Orders
- Ordination: 20 July 1915
- Consecration: 14 May 1934 by Henricus Lamiroy

Personal details
- Born: 20 October 1887 Vlamertinge, West Flanders, Belgium
- Died: 22 November 1952 (aged 65) Brussels, Belgium
- Coat of arms

Joris Six (Vlamertinge, 20 October 1887 - Brussels, 22 November 1952) was a bishop of the titular diocese of Baliana in Algeria, and apostolic vicar of the vicariate-general Leopoldstad in Belgian Congo.

== Youth ==
His father Cyriel Hendrik Six (born on 25 December 1855) was a flax and grain merchant and trader in legumes in Vlamertinge. On 28 September 1886 he married Marie-Louise Parret. Five children came from the marriage, of which Georges (which later changed to Joris) was the oldest. He was born around five o'clock in the morning on 20 October 1887. He attended primary education at the St. Joseph School in Vlamertinge and secondary school at Sint-Vincentius college in Ypres.

== Career ==
Six joined the Missionaries of Scheut and left for the Belgian Congo on 19 February 1914. He worked in Kangu, Boma, Muanda and Leopoldstad. In the latter place he assisted Bishop Camille Van Ronslé. From 1928 to 1930 he was back in Belgium and active as the economist of the monastery in Scheut. In 1930 he left for Congo for a second period, first back to Boma, then back to Leopoldstad. In October 1932 he was responsible for the organization of a Catholic congress there under the chairmanship of the then apostolic delegate Archbishop Giovanni Battista Dellepiane. The Vicargo General Leopold City was, after the dismissal of Natalis De Cleene C.I.C.M. unoccupied in 1932. On 26 February 1934, Pope Pius XI appointed Six as Apostolic Vicar of Leopold City and title bishop of Baliana. Before his episcopal ordination he had to return to Belgium. On 10 April 1934 he returned to Antwerp by boat. On 14 May 1934 he was ordained a bishop in the St Martin's Cathedral, Ypres. Consecrating bishop was Mgr. Lamiroy, bishop of Bruges, with the assistance of Mgr. Coppieters, Bishop of Ghent and Mgr. Van der Hoven, apostolic vicar of Boma and title bishop of Sinna. After the consecration, he returned to his vicarage.

== Death ==
Six died on 22 November 1952 from the effects of an embolism. He was buried on 27 November 1952 in Zuun, where the cemetery of the Missionaries of Scheut is located. On 29 June 1953, Six was succeeded as Bishop of Baliana by Félix Scalais.

== Legacy ==
The "Monseigneur Sixplein" in Vlamertinge is named after him, and in the St. Vedastus church there hangs a portrait of Six. His coat of arms is also visible in the glass in the entrance hall of the Sint-Vincentius College in Ypres.
