= Raphaël de la Kethulle de Ryhove =

Raphaël Marie Joseph de la Kethulle de Ryhove (Sint-Michiels, 15 September 1890 - Woluwe-Saint-Pierre, 25 June 1956), nicknamed Tata Raphaël (Father Raphaël) or Sango Raphaël (Priest Raphaël), was a Belgian Scheut missionary priest in the Belgian Congo.

== Life ==
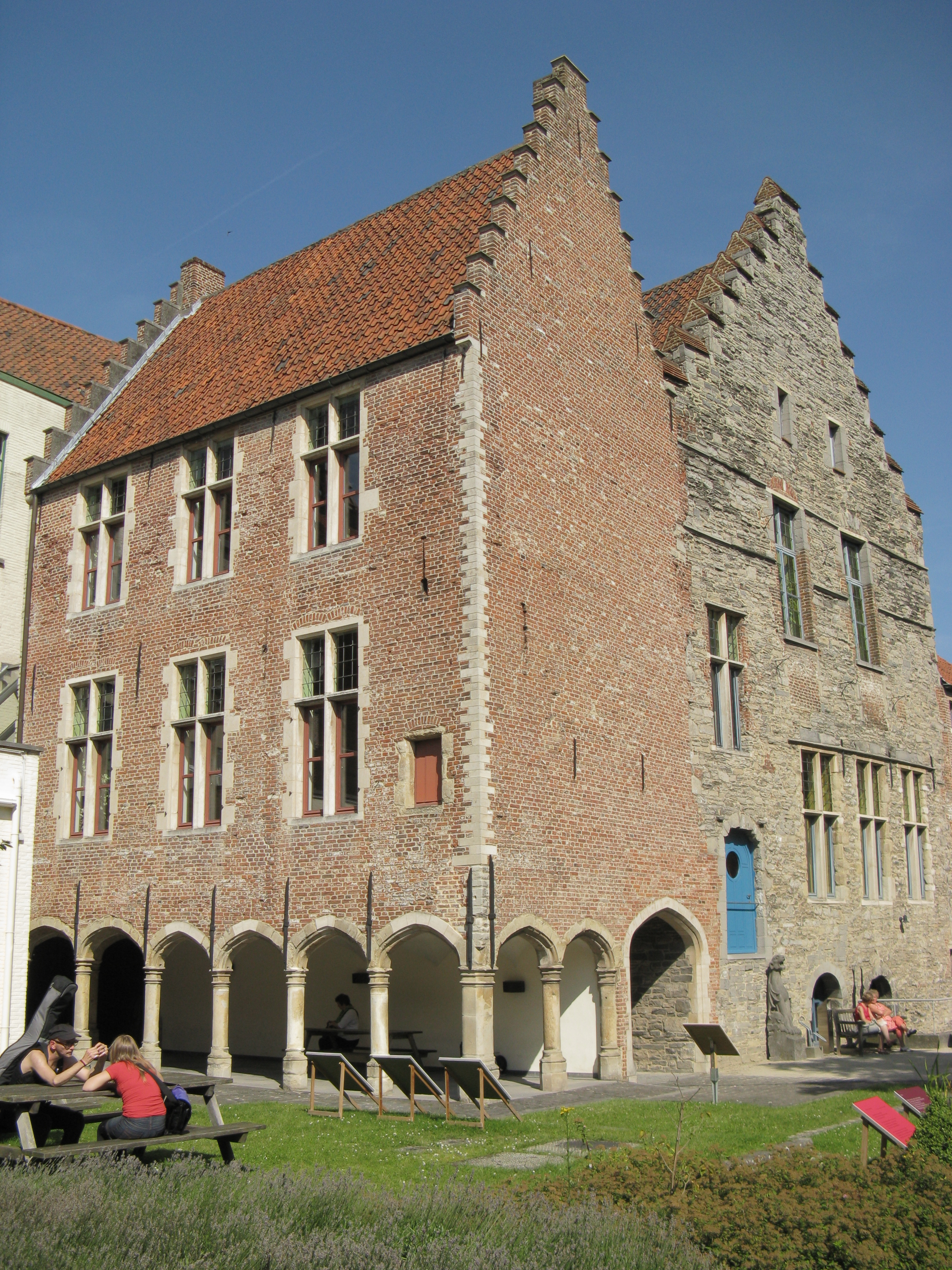
The late Medieval Rijhove Court (Hof van Rijhove), residence of Calvinist leader François de la Kethulle de Ryhove (1531-1585).

Raphaël de la Kethulle de Ryhove's family originates from Ghent, where a lot of the family members were civil servants in late Medieval times. The family rose to the rank of nobility in the fifteenth century.

Raphaël de la Kethulle de Ryhove was one of fourteen children of Henri de la Kethulle de Ryhove (1854-1929) and Victorine Coppieters (1861-1934). He went to school at Francis Xavier Institute and Saint Louis College in Bruges. He had thirty classmates, including future fellow missionary Edward Leys. He became a novice in the Congregation of the Immaculate Heart of Mary, known as the Scheut Missionaries, in 1908, and was ordained a priest in July 1914. Meanwhile, he was mobilised in the army and from the start of the First World War until the end of 1916 he was a chaplain and stretcher-bearer in the Belgian Army.

He left for the Belgian Congo in December 1916 and was assigned to the Scheut fathers in Léopoldville, where he would stay over forty years. At that time, the city only had approximately 5000 inhabitants. His first initiative was the foundation of a school. A few years later, he also founded a vocational school. He also founded a secondary school in 1933 with the aim of educating the future civil servants and leaders. In 1955, he founded another school, for the training of sports instructors.

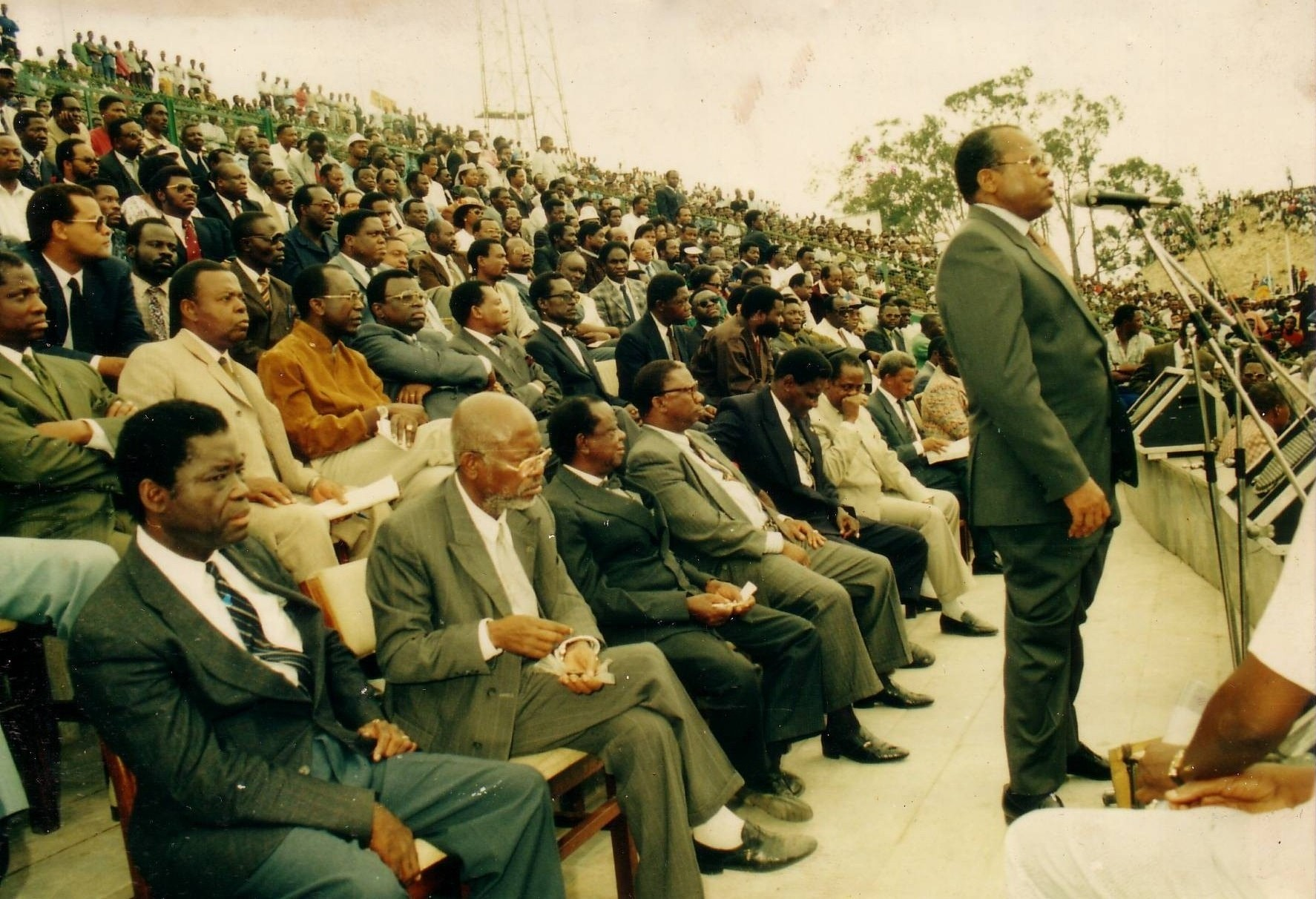
First meeting of the Union Sacrée de l'Opposition Radicale at the Stade du 20 Mai (Stade Tata Raphaël) in Kinshasa. Étienne Tshisekedi speaks from a microphone at the right. At the first chair in the front row is Marcel Lihau; to his left is Vincent Mbwakiem.

In 1922, he organised the first Congolese scouting group. Furthermore, he was concerned with physical education. In 1919, he created the Association Sportive Congolaise. The first competitions were organised in 1933. An open-air swimming pool was constructed to hold swimming competitions.

De la Kethulle commissioned a lot of buildings as well. In 1931 he built a first stadium, which was quickly deemed too small and was demolished in 1936 to make room for the consedrably larger Stade Reine Astrid. Next to the stadium, he constructed a ballroom which could be used for theater plays and film screenings. During the Second World War he added a sports park with football fields, tennis courts, basketball courts, among other facilities. In 1948, the construction of a new stadium began, suited for international sports events. This Stade Roi Baudouin was opened in 1952.

Furthermore, he founded the newspaper La Croix du Congo, and some popular neighbourhoods (cités) for the inhabitants of Léopoldville.

Due to health concerns, de la Kethulle returned to Belgium towards the end of his life. Two of his former students, both future government ministers Thomas Kanza and Jean Bolikango, paid tribute to Tata Raphaël (father Raphaël), as he was popularly called. His remains were brought back to the Congo by boat and were buried in Léopoldville in the presence of more than 100 000 attendees. The big Stade Roi Baudouin was renamed Stade Tata Raphaël in his honour after the end of president Mobutu's time in office in 1997.

== Publications ==
- DE LA KETHULLE DE RYHOVE, Raphaël, "Le vagabondage à Kinshasa", in Congo, 1922, II, p. 727-730.
- Ibid., "De noodzakelijkheid van lagere en vakscholen", in Sint-Tillo Missiebond, Bruges, 1931, 4, p. 5.
- Ibid., "Les institutions sportives", in Congo belge, 1944, p. 192-194.
- Letters published in: Ibid., Congo belge, 1944, p. 124-128; Ibid., Congo belge, 1931, 111–114.

== Literature ==
- R. STORME & P. DEHOPERÉ, "KETHULLE DE RYHOVE (DE LA) (Raphael-Marie-Joseph)", in: Biographie Belge d'Outre-Mer, volume VI, 1968, p. 573-576.
- Généalogie de la Kethulle, in: Annuaire de la noblesse belge, 1852.
- Robert COPPIETERS 'T WALLANT, Notices généalogiques et historiques sur quelques familles brugeoises, Bruges (1942).
- Emmanuel COPPIETERS 'T WALLANT & Charles VAN RENYNGHE DE VOXVRIE, Histoire professionnelle et sociale de la famille Coppieters, second volume, Tablettes des Flandres, Recueil 8, Bruges, 1968.
- Emmanuel COPPIETERS, Raphaël de la Kethulle de Ryhove, missionaris van Scheut, in: Nationaal Biografisch Woordenboek, T. 4, Brussels, 1970.
- Emmanuel COPPIETERS DE TER ZAELE, L'audacieux Tata Raphaël de la Kethulle, éducateur, créateur d'écoles et de stades à Kinshasa, Brussels, 1990.
- Hervé DOUXCHAMPS, La famille de la Kethulle, Brussels, 1996.
- Renson, Roland; Peeters, Christel (1994). "Sport als missie: Raphaël de la Kethulle de Ryhove (1890-1956)". In D'hoker, M.; et al. (eds.). Voor lichaam & geest: katholieken, lichamelijke opvoeding en sport in de 19de en 20ste eeuw. Leuven: Universitaire Pers Leuven. pp. 201–16. ISBN 9789061866152.
