= CAF 5-year ranking =

Ranking system for CAF club teams

The CAF 5-year ranking system is used by the Confederation of African Football (CAF) to determine the number of clubs that each member association may enter its club football competitions; the CAF Champions League and the CAF Confederation Cup. At present, those associations ranked in the top 12 may enter two teams into each of the two club competitions, while the remaining associations are limited to a single team in each competition.

== Criteria for awarding points ==
CAF approved its basic criteria based on the criteria used in the election of the CAF Clubs of the 20th Century in 2000 for awarding points in 2003. This was changed in 2005 with the addition of a criterion that rewards clubs that advance to the semi-finals of the FIFA Club World Cup. This methodology has also been used to create an all-time ranking for CAF clubs, adding the points that would have been obtained by each club based on its results since 1965.

For the rankings system, only results since 1998 have been counted with the CAF Super Cup and the FIFA World Cup Club excluded from the system since 2011. The table below shows the years during which the competitions were operated:

| Competition | 6 Points | 5 Points | 4 Points | 3 Points | 2 Points | 1 Point | 0.5 Point |
Competitions used in rankings
| CAF Champions League | Champions | Runners-up | Semi-finalist | Quarter-finalist (from 2017) | 3rd in Group Stage | 4th in Group Stage | |
| CAF Confederation Cup | | Champions | Runners-up | Semi-finalist | Quarter-finalist (from 2017) | 3rd in Group Stage | 4th in Group Stage |

=== Weighting factor ===
Since 2011, points have been weighted according to the year of performance results when calculating the rankings. For the current ranking, the points calculated based on performances in CAF club competitions between 2020–21 and the 2024–25 season, the points are multiplied by a coefficient according to the year as follows:

- 2024–25: × 5
- 2023–24: × 4
- 2022–23: × 3
- 2021–22: × 2
- 2020–21: × 1

== Association ranking for the 2025–26 CAF club season ==
The association ranking for the 2025–26 CAF Champions League and the 2025–26 CAF Confederation Cup will be based on results from each CAF club competition from 2020–21 to the 2024–25 season.

Legend

- CL: CAF Champions League
- CC: CAF Confederation Cup
- ≥: Associations points might increase on basis of its clubs performance in 2024–25 CAF club competitions
- Associations ranked 1–12 are eligible to enter two teams in each CAF club competition.

| Rank | | | Association | 2020–21 (× 1) | | 2021–22 (× 2) | | 2022–23 (× 3) | | 2023–24 (× 4) | | 2024–25 (× 5) | | Total |
| 2025 | 2024 | Mvt | Association | CL | CC | CL | CC | CL | CC | CL | CC | CL | CC | Total |
|---|---|---|---|---|---|---|---|---|---|---|---|---|---|---|
| 1 | 1 | — | Egypt | 8 | 3 | 7 | 4 | 8 | 2.5 | 7 | 7 | 10 | 4 | 190.5 |
| 2 | 2 | — | Morocco | 4 | 6 | 9 | 5 | 8 | 2 | 2 | 4 | 5 | 5 | 142 |
| 3 | 4 | +1 | South Africa | 8 | 2 | 5 | 4 | 4 | 3 | 4 | 1.5 | 9 | 3 | 131 |
| 4 | 3 | -1 | Algeria | 6 | 5 | 7 | 1 | 6 | 5 | 2 | 3 | 5 | 5 | 130 |
| 5 | 6 | +1 | Tanzania | 3 | 0.5 | 0 | 2 | 3 | 4 | 6 | 0 | 2 | 4 | 82.5 |
| 6 | 5 | -1 | Tunisia | 4 | 3 | 5 | 1 | 4 | 2 | 6 | 1 | 3 | 0.5 | 82.5 |
| 7 | 8 | +1 | Angola | 1 | 0 | 5 | 0 | 2 | 0 | 3 | 1.5 | 2 | 2 | 55 |
| 8 | 7 | -1 | DR Congo | 4 | 0 | 0 | 3 | 1 | 2 | 4 | 0 | 2 | 0 | 45 |
| 9 | 9 | — | Sudan | 3 | 0 | 3 | 0 | 3 | 0 | 2 | 0 | 3 | 0 | 41 |
| 10 | 11 | +1 | Ivory Coast | 0 | 0 | 0 | 1 | 0 | 3 | 3 | 0 | 1 | 2 | 38 |
| 11 | 10 | -1 | Libya | 0 | 0.5 | 0 | 5 | 0 | 0.5 | 0 | 3 | 0 | 0 | 24 |
| 12 | 12 | — | Nigeria | 0 | 2 | 0 | 0 | 0 | 2 | 0 | 2 | 0 | 1 | 21 |
| 13 | 15 | +2 | Mali | 0 | 0 | 0 | 0 | 0 | 1 | 0 | 2 | 1 | 0.5 | 18.5 |
| 14 | 14 | — | Ghana | 0 | 0 | 0 | 0 | 0 | 0 | 1 | 3 | 0 | 0 | 16 |
| 15 | 13 | -2 | Guinea | 2 | 0 | 1 | 0 | 2 | 0 | 0 | 0.5 | 0 | 0 | 12 |
| 16 | 19 | +3 | Botswana | 0 | 0 | 1 | 0 | 0 | 0 | 1 | 0 | 0 | 0.5 | 8.5 |
| 17 | 21 | +4 | Senegal | 1 | 2 | 0 | 0 | 0 | 0 | 0 | 0 | 0 | 1 | 8 |
| 18 | 17 | -1 | Mauritania | 0 | 0 | 0 | 0 | 0 | 0 | 2 | 0 | 0 | 0 | 8 |
| 19 | 18 | -1 | Congo | 0 | 0 | 0 | 1 | 0 | 1 | 0 | 0.5 | 0 | 0 | 7 |
| 20 | 16 | -4 | Cameroon | 0 | 3 | 0 | 0.5 | 1 | 0 | 0 | 0 | 0 | 0 | 7 |
| 21 | 22 | +1 | Togo | 0 | 0 | 0 | 0 | 0 | 1 | 0 | 0 | 0 | 0 | 3 |
| 22 | 22 | — | Uganda | 0 | 0 | 0 | 0 | 1 | 0 | 0 | 0 | 0 | 0 | 3 |
| 23 | - | new | Mozambique | 0 | 0 | 0 | 0 | 0 | 0 | 0 | 0 | 0 | 0.5 | 2.5 |
| 24 | 20 | -4 | Zambia | 0 | 1.5 | 0 | 0.5 | 0 | 0 | 0 | 0 | 0 | 0 | 2.5 |
| 25 | 24 | -1 | Eswatini | 0 | 0 | 0 | 0.5 | 0 | 0 | 0 | 0 | 0 | 0 | 1 |
| 25 | 24 | -1 | Niger | 0 | 0 | 0 | 0.5 | 0 | 0 | 0 | 0 | 0 | 0 | 1 |
| 27 | 26 | -1 | Burkina Faso | 0 | 0.5 | 0 | 0 | 0 | 0 | 0 | 0 | 0 | 0 | 0.5 |

== Association ranking for the 2026–27 CAF club season ==
The association ranking for the 2026–27 CAF Champions League and the 2026–27 CAF Confederation Cup will be based on results from each CAF club competition from 2021–22 to the 2025–26 season with the 2025–26 season currently underway.

Legend

- CL: CAF Champions League
- CC: CAF Confederation Cup
- **Associations in bold** are still active in 2025–26 CAF club competitions
Associations ranked 1–12 are eligible to enter two teams in each CAF club competition.

| Rank | | | Association | 2021–22 (× 1) | | 2022–23 (× 2) | | 2023–24 (× 3) | | 2024–25 (× 4) | | 2025–26 (× 5) | | Total |
| 2026 | 2025 | Mvt | Association | CL | CC | CL | CC | CL | CC | CL | CC | CL | CC | Total |
|---|---|---|---|---|---|---|---|---|---|---|---|---|---|---|
| 1 | 1 | — | **Egypt** | 7 | 4 | 8 | 2.5 | 7 | 7 | 10 | 4 | 6 | 6 | 190 |
| 2 | 2 | — | **Morocco** | 9 | 5 | 8 | 2 | 2 | 4 | 5 | 5 | 9 | 5 | 162 |
| 3 | 4 | +1 | **Algeria** | 7 | 1 | 6 | 5 | 2 | 3 | 5 | 5 | 3 | 8 | 140 |
| 4 | 3 | -1 | **South Africa** | 5 | 4 | 4 | 3 | 4 | 1.5 | 9 | 3 | 6 | 2 | 127.5 |
| 5 | 5 | — | **Tanzania** | 0 | 2 | 3 | 4 | 6 | 0 | 2 | 4 | 3 | 1.5 | 80.5 |
| 6 | 6 | — | **Tunisia** | 5 | 1 | 4 | 2 | 6 | 1 | 3 | 0.5 | 4 | 0 | 73 |
| 7 | 7 | — | **Angola** | 5 | 0 | 2 | 0 | 3 | 1.5 | 2 | 2 | 2 | 0 | 48.5 |
| 8 | 8 | — | **DR Congo** | 0 | 3 | 1 | 2 | 4 | 0 | 2 | 0 | 1 | 2 | 44 |
| 9 | 9 | — | **Sudan** | 3 | 0 | 3 | 0 | 2 | 0 | 3 | 0 | 3 | 0 | 42 |
| 10 | 13 | +3 | **Mali** | 0 | 0 | 0 | 1 | 0 | 2 | 1 | 0.5 | 3 | 1 | 34 |
| 11 | 10 | -1 | **Ivory Coast** | 0 | 1 | 0 | 3 | 3 | 0 | 1 | 2 | 0 | 0.5 | 30.5 |
| 12 | 12 | — | **Nigeria** | 0 | 0 | 0 | 2 | 0 | 2 | 0 | 1 | 1 | 0 | 19 |
| 13 | 11 | -2 | Libya | 0 | 5 | 0 | 0.5 | 0 | 3 | 0 | 0 | 0 | 0 | 15 |
| 14 | 19 | +5 | **Congo** | 0 | 1 | 0 | 1 | 0 | 0.5 | 0 | 0 | 0 | 2 | 14.5 |
| 15 | 24 | +9 | **Zambia** | 0 | 0.5 | 0 | 0 | 0 | 0 | 0 | 0 | 2 | 0.5 | 13 |
| 16 | 14 | -2 | Ghana | 0 | 0 | 0 | 0 | 1 | 3 | 0 | 0 | 0 | 0 | 12 |
| 17 | 15 | -2 | Guinea | 1 | 0 | 2 | 0 | 0 | 0.5 | 0 | 0 | 0 | 0 | 6.5 |
| 18 | 16 | -2 | Botswana | 1 | 0 | 0 | 0 | 1 | 0 | 0 | 0.5 | 0 | 0 | 6 |
| 18 | 18 | — | Mauritania | 0 | 0 | 0 | 0 | 2 | 0 | 0 | 0 | 0 | 0 | 6 |
| 20 | 17 | -3 | Senegal | 0 | 0 | 0 | 0 | 0 | 0 | 0 | 1 | 0 | 0 | 4 |
| 21 | — | new | **Kenya** | 0 | 0 | 0 | 0 | 0 | 0 | 0 | 0 | 0 | 0.5 | 2.5 |
| 21 | 20 | -1 | Cameroon | 0 | 0.5 | 1 | 0 | 0 | 0 | 0 | 0 | 0 | 0 | 2.5 |
| 23 | 23 | — | Mozambique | 0 | 0 | 0 | 0 | 0 | 0 | 0 | 0.5 | 0 | 0 | 2 |
| 23 | 21 | -2 | Togo | 0 | 0 | 0 | 1 | 0 | 0 | 0 | 0 | 0 | 0 | 2 |
| 23 | 22 | -1 | Uganda | 0 | 0 | 1 | 0 | 0 | 0 | 0 | 0 | 0 | 0 | 2 |
| 26 | 25 | -1 | Eswatini | 0 | 0.5 | 0 | 0 | 0 | 0 | 0 | 0 | 0 | 0 | 0.5 |
| 26 | 25 | -1 | Niger | 0 | 0.5 | 0 | 0 | 0 | 0 | 0 | 0 | 0 | 0 | 0.5 |

== Association ranking for the 2027–28 CAF club season ==
The association ranking for the 2027–28 CAF Champions League and the 2027–28 CAF Confederation Cup will be based on results from each CAF club competition from 2022–23 to the 2026–27 season with the 2026–27 season currently underway.

Legend

- CL: CAF Champions League
- CC: CAF Confederation Cup
- **Associations in bold** are still active in 2025–26 CAF club competitions
Associations ranked 1–12 are eligible to enter two teams in each CAF club competition.

| Rank | | | Association | 2022–23 (× 1) | | 2023–24 (× 2) | | 2024–25 (× 3) | | 2025–26 (× 4) | | 2026–27 (× 5) | | Total |
| 2027 | 2026 | Mvt | Association | CL | CC | CL | CC | CL | CC | CL | CC | CL | CC | Total |
|---|---|---|---|---|---|---|---|---|---|---|---|---|---|---|
| 1 | 1 | — | **Egypt** | 8 | 2.5 | 7 | 7 | 10 | 4 | 6 | 6 | ≥2 | ≥0.5 | ≥141 |
| 2 | 2 | — | **Morocco** | 8 | 2 | 2 | 4 | 5 | 5 | 9 | 5 | ≥2 | ≥1 | ≥123 |
| 3 | 3 | — | **Algeria** | 6 | 5 | 2 | 3 | 5 | 5 | 3 | 8 | ≥1 | ≥0.5 | ≥102.5 |
| 4 | 4 | — | **South Africa** | 4 | 3 | 4 | 1.5 | 9 | 3 | 6 | 2 | ≥1 | ≥0.5 | ≥93.5 |
| 5 | 5 | — | **Tanzania** | 3 | 4 | 6 | 0 | 2 | 4 | 3 | 1.5 | ≥2 | ≥1 | ≥70 |
| 6 | 6 | — | **Tunisia** | 4 | 2 | 6 | 1 | 3 | 0.5 | 4 | 0 | ≥2 | ≥0.5 | ≥59 |
| 7 | 7 | — | **Angola** | 2 | 0 | 3 | 1.5 | 2 | 2 | 2 | 0 | ≥2 | ≥0.5 | ≥43.5 |
| 8 | 9 | +1 | **Sudan** | 3 | 0 | 2 | 0 | 3 | 0 | 3 | 0 | ≥1 | 0 | ≥33 |
| 9 | 8 | -1 | **DR Congo** | 1 | 2 | 4 | 0 | 2 | 0 | 1 | 2 | 0 | ≥0.5 | ≥31.5 |
| 10 | 10 | — | **Mali** | 0 | 1 | 0 | 2 | 1 | 0.5 | 3 | 1 | 0 | ≥0.5 | ≥28 |
| 11 | 11 | — | **Ivory Coast** | 0 | 3 | 3 | 0 | 1 | 2 | 0 | 0.5 | 0 | 0 | 20 |
| 12 | 12 | — | **Nigeria** | 0 | 2 | 0 | 2 | 0 | 1 | 1 | 0 | 0 | 0 | 13 |
| 13 | 15 | +2 | **Zambia** | 0 | 0 | 0 | 0 | 0 | 0 | 2 | 0.5 | 0 | ≥0.5 | ≥12.5 |
| 14 | 14 | — | **Congo** | 0 | 1 | 0 | 0.5 | 0 | 0 | 0 | 2 | 0 | 0 | 10 |
| 15 | 18 | +3 | Mauritania | 0 | 0 | 2 | 0 | 0 | 0 | 0 | 0 | ≥1 | 0 | ≥9 |
| 16 | 13 | -3 | Libya | 0 | 0.5 | 0 | 3 | 0 | 0 | 0 | 0 | 0 | ≥0.5 | ≥9 |
| 17 | 17 | — | Guinea | 2 | 0 | 0 | 0.5 | 0 | 0 | 0 | 0 | ≥1 | 0 | ≥8 |
| 18 | 16 | -2 | Ghana | 0 | 0 | 1 | 3 | 0 | 0 | 0 | 0 | 0 | 0 | 8 |
| 19 | 21 | +2 | Cameroon | 1 | 0 | 0 | 0 | 0 | 0 | 0 | 0 | ≥1 | 0 | ≥6 |
| 20 | 23 | +3 | Mozambique | 0 | 0 | 0 | 0 | 0 | 0.5 | 0 | 0 | 0 | ≥0.5 | ≥4 |
| 21 | 23 | +2 | Togo | 0 | 1 | 0 | 0 | 0 | 0 | 0 | 0 | 0 | ≥0.5 | ≥3.5 |
| 22 | 18 | -4 | Botswana | 0 | 0 | 1 | 0 | 0 | 0.5 | 0 | 0 | 0 | 0 | 3.5 |
| 23 | 20 | -3 | Senegal | 0 | 0 | 0 | 0 | 0 | 1 | 0 | 0 | 0 | 0 | 3 |
| 24 | 21 | -3 | **Kenya** | 0 | 0 | 0 | 0 | 0 | 0 | 0 | 0.5 | 0 | 0 | 2 |
| 25 | 23 | -2 | Uganda | 1 | 0 | 0 | 0 | 0 | 0 | 0 | 0 | 0 | 0 | 1 |

== Club ranking for the 2025–26 CAF club season ==
The club ranking is used for seeding in the CAF Champions League and the CAF Confederation Cup. Pending equality in ranking points, the team receiving more points in the most recent season is considered as the higher-ranked team.

The club ranking for the 2025–26 CAF Champions League and the 2025–26 CAF Confederation Cup is based on results from each CAF club competition from the 2020–21 to the 2024–25 seasons.

| Rank | Club | 2020–21 (× 1) | 2021–22 (× 2) | 2022–23 (× 3) | 2023–24 (× 4) | 2024–25 (× 5) | Total |
|---|---|---|---|---|---|---|---|
| 1 | (Egypt) Al Ahly | 6 | 5 | 6 | 6 | 4 | 78 |
| 2 | (South Africa) Mamelodi Sundowns | 3 | 3 | 4 | 4 | 5 | 62 |
| 3 | (Tunisia) Espérance de Tunis | 4 | 3 | 4 | 5 | 3 | 57 |
| 4 | (Morocco) RS Berkane | 1 | 5 | 0 | 4 | 5 | 52 |
| 5 | (Tanzania) Simba | 3 | 2 | 3 | 3 | 4 | 48 |
| 6 | (Egypt) Pyramids | 3 | 2 | 2 | 1 | 6 | 47 |
| 7 | (Egypt) Zamalek | 2 | 2 | 2 | 5 | 2 | 42 |
| 8 | (Morocco) Wydad AC | 4 | 6 | 5 | 2 | 0 | 39 |
| 9 | (Algeria) USM Alger | 0 | 0 | 5 | 3 | 2 | 37 |
| 10 | (Algeria) CR Belouizdad | 3 | 3 | 3 | 2 | 2 | 36 |
| 11 | (Sudan) Al-Hilal | 1 | 2 | 2 | 2 | 3 | 34 |
| 12 | (Tanzania) Young Africans | 0 | 0 | 4 | 3 | 2 | 34 |
| 13 | (Ivory Coast) ASEC Mimosas | 0 | 1 | 3 | 3 | 2 | 33 |
| 14 | (Democratic Republic of the Congo) TP Mazembe | 2 | 3 | 0.5 | 4 | 1 | 30.5 |
| 15 | (South Africa) Orlando Pirates | 2 | 4 | 0 | 0 | 4 | 30 |
| 16 | (Morocco) Raja CA | 5 | 3 | 3 | 0 | 2 | 30 |
| 17 | (Angola) Petro de Luanda | 1 | 4 | 2 | 3 | 0 | 27 |
| 18 | (Morocco) ASFAR Rabat | 0 | 0 | 2 | 0 | 3 | 21 |
| 19 | (Algeria) MC Alger | 3 | 0 | 0 | 0 | 3 | 18 |
| 20 | (Angola) Sagrada Esperança | 0 | 1 | 0 | 1 | 2 | 16 |
| 21 | (Algeria) CS Constantine | 0 | 0 | 0 | 0 | 3 | 15 |
| 21 | (South Africa) Stellenbosch | 0 | 0 | 0 | 0 | 3 | 15 |
| 23 | (Egypt) Al-Masry | 0 | 2 | 0 | 0 | 2 | 14 |
| 24 | (Nigeria) Rivers United | 0 | 0 | 2 | 2 | 0 | 14 |
| 25 | (Algeria) JS Kabylie | 4 | 0 | 3 | 0 | 0 | 13 |
| 26 | (Ghana) Dreams FC | 0 | 0 | 0 | 3 | 0 | 12 |
| 27 | (Mali) Stade Malien | 0 | 0 | 0 | 2 | 0.5 | 10.5 |
| 28 | (Guinea) Horoya | 2 | 1 | 2 | 0 | 0 | 10 |
| 29 | (Egypt) Future | 0 | 0 | 0.5 | 2 | 0 | 9.5 |
| 30 | (Tunisia) Étoile du Sahel | 1 | 2 | 0 | 1 | 0 | 9 |
| 31 | (South Africa) Marumo Gallants | 0 | 0 | 3 | 0 | 0 | 9 |
| 32 | (Algeria) ES Sétif | 1 | 4 | 0 | 0 | 0 | 9 |
| 33 | (Mauritania) FC Nouadhibou | 0 | 0 | 0 | 2 | 0 | 8.5 |
| 34 | (Libya) Abu Salim | 0 | 0 | 0 | 2 | 0 | 8 |
| 35 | (Nigeria) Enyimba | 2 | 0 | 0 | 0 | 1 | 7 |
| 35 | (Senegal) ASC Jaraaf | 2 | 0 | 0 | 0 | 1 | 7 |
| 37 | (Cameroon) Coton Sport | 3 | 0.5 | 1 | 0 | 0 | 7 |
| 38 | (Tunisia) CS Sfaxien | 2 | 1 | 0 | 0 | 0.5 | 6.5 |
| 39 | (Botswana) Jwaneng Galaxy | 0 | 1 | 0 | 1 | 0 | 6 |
| 40 | (Tunisia) US Monastir | 0 | 0 | 2 | 0 | 0 | 6 |
| 41 | (Sudan) Al-Merrikh | 1 | 1 | 1 | 0 | 0 | 6 |
| 42 | (Libya) Al-Ahli Tripoli | 0 | 3 | 0 | 0 | 0 | 6 |
| 43 | (Democratic Republic of the Congo) Maniema Union | 0 | 0 | 0 | 0 | 1 | 5 |
| 43 | (Ivory Coast) Stade d'Abidjan | 0 | 0 | 0 | 0 | 1 | 5 |
| 43 | (Mali) Djoliba | 0 | 0 | 0 | 0 | 1 | 5 |
| 43 | (Angola) Bravos do Maquis | 0 | 0 | 0 | 0 | 1 | 5 |
| 43 | (Angola) Lunda Sul | 0 | 0 | 0 | 0 | 1 | 5 |
| 48 | (Republic of the Congo) Diables Noirs | 0 | 0 | 1 | 0.5 | 0 | 5 |
| 49 | (Democratic Republic of the Congo) AS Vita Club | 2 | 0 | 1 | 0 | 0 | 5 |
| 50 | (South Africa) Kaizer Chiefs | 5 | 0 | 0 | 0 | 0 | 5 |
| 51 | (Ghana) Medeama | 0 | 0 | 0 | 1 | 0 | 4 |
| 51 | (Tunisia) Club Africain | 0 | 0 | 0 | 1 | 0 | 4 |
| 51 | (South Africa) Sekhukhune United | 0 | 0 | 0 | 1 | 0 | 4 |
| 51 | (Libya) Al Hilal Benghazi | 0 | 0 | 0 | 1 | 0 | 4 |
| 55 | (Libya) Al Ittihad | 0 | 2 | 0 | 0 | 0 | 4 |
| 55 | (South Africa) AmaZulu | 0 | 2 | 0 | 0 | 0 | 4 |
| 57 | (Democratic Republic of the Congo) Saint-Éloi Lupopo | 0 | 0 | 1 | 0 | 0 | 3 |
| 57 | (Mali) Real Bamako | 0 | 0 | 1 | 0 | 0 | 3 |
| 57 | (Togo) ASKO Kara | 0 | 0 | 1 | 0 | 0 | 3 |
| 57 | (Uganda) Vipers | 0 | 0 | 1 | 0 | 0 | 3 |
| 61 | (Botswana) Orapa United | 0 | 0 | 0 | 0 | 0.5 | 2.5 |
| 61 | (Mozambique) Black Bulls | 0 | 0 | 0 | 0 | 0.5 | 2.5 |
| 63 | (Angola) Académica do Lobito | 0 | 0 | 0 | 0.5 | 0 | 2 |
| 63 | (Guinea) Académie SOAR | 0 | 0 | 0 | 0.5 | 0 | 2 |
| 63 | (South Africa) SuperSport United | 0 | 0 | 0 | 0.5 | 0 | 2 |
| 66 | (Algeria) JS Saoura | 0 | 1 | 0 | 0 | 0 | 2 |
| 66 | (Republic of the Congo) AS Otôho | 0 | 1 | 0 | 0 | 0 | 2 |
| 68 | (Democratic Republic of the Congo) DC Motema Pembe | 0 | 0 | 0.5 | 0 | 0 | 1.5 |
| 68 | (Libya) Al Akhdar | 0 | 0 | 0.5 | 0 | 0 | 1.5 |
| 70 | (Zambia) Zanaco | 0 | 0.5 | 0 | 0 | 0 | 1 |
| 70 | (Niger) USGN | 0 | 0.5 | 0 | 0 | 0 | 1 |
| 70 | (Eswatini) Royal Leopards | 0 | 0.5 | 0 | 0 | 0 | 1 |
| 73 | (Zambia) Nkana | 1 | 0 | 0 | 0 | 0 | 1 |
| 73 | (Senegal) Teungueth | 1 | 0 | 0 | 0 | 0 | 1 |
| 75 | (Libya) Al Ahly Benghazi | 0.5 | 0 | 0 | 0 | 0 | 0.5 |
| 75 | (Burkina Faso) Salitas | 0.5 | 0 | 0 | 0 | 0 | 0.5 |
| 75 | (Tanzania) Namungo | 0.5 | 0 | 0 | 0 | 0 | 0.5 |
| 75 | (Zambia) NAPSA Stars | 0.5 | 0 | 0 | 0 | 0 | 0.5 |

== Club ranking for the 2026–27 CAF club season ==
The club ranking is used for seeding in the CAF Champions League and the CAF Confederation Cup.Pending equality in ranking points, the team receiving more points in the most recent season is considered as the higher-ranked team.

The club ranking for the 2026–27 CAF Champions League and the 2026–27 CAF Confederation Cup is to be based on results from each CAF club competition from the 2021–22 to the 2025–26 seasons.

Legend

Club is still active in 2025-26 CAF Champions League
Club is still active in 2025-26 CAF Confederation Cup

| Rank | Club | 2021–22 (× 1) | 2022–23 (× 2) | 2023–24 (× 3) | 2024–25 (× 4) | 2025–26 (× 5) | Total |
|---|---|---|---|---|---|---|---|
| 1 | (South Africa) Mamelodi Sundowns | 3 | 4 | 4 | 5 | 6 | 73 |
| 2 | (Egypt) Al Ahly | 5 | 6 | 6 | 4 | 3 | 66 |
| 3 | (Tunisia) Espérance de Tunis | 3 | 4 | 5 | 3 | 4 | 58 |
| 4 | (Morocco) RS Berkane | 5 | 0 | 4 | 5 | 4 | 57 |
| 5 | (Algeria) USM Alger | 0 | 5 | 3 | 2 | 5 | 52 |
| 6 | (Egypt) Zamalek | 2 | 2 | 5 | 2 | 4 | 49 |
| 7 | (Egypt) Pyramids | 2 | 2 | 1 | 6 | 3 | 48 |
| 8 | (Morocco) ASFAR Rabat | 0 | 2 | 0 | 3 | 5 | 41 |
| 9 | (Sudan) Al-Hilal | 2 | 2 | 2 | 3 | 3 | 39 |
| 10 | (Algeria) CR Belouizdad | 3 | 3 | 2 | 2 | 3 | 38 |
| 11 | (Tanzania) Simba | 2 | 3 | 3 | 4 | 1 | 38 |
| 12 | (Tanzania) Young Africans | 0 | 4 | 3 | 2 | 2 | 35 |
| 13 | (Morocco) Wydad AC | 6 | 5 | 2 | 0 | 2 | 32 |
| 14 | (Angola) Petro de Luanda | 4 | 2 | 3 | 0 | 2 | 27 |
| 15 | (Ivory Coast) ASEC Mimosas | 1 | 3 | 3 | 2 | 0 | 24 |
| 16 | (Mali) Stade Malien | 0 | 0 | 2 | 0.5 | 3 | 23 |
| 17 | (Algeria) MC Alger | 0 | 0 | 0 | 3 | 2 | 22 |
| 18 | (Egypt) Al-Masry | 2 | 0 | 0 | 2 | 2 | 20 |
| 19 | (South Africa) Orlando Pirates | 4 | 0 | 0 | 4 | 0 | 20 |
| 20 | (Democratic Republic of the Congo) TP Mazembe | 3 | 0.5 | 4 | 1 | 0 | 20 |
| 21 | (Morocco) Raja CA | 3 | 3 | 0 | 2 | 0 | 17 |
| 22 | (Morocco) Olympic Safi | 0 | 0 | 0 | 0 | 3 | 15 |
| 23 | (Nigeria) Rivers United | 0 | 2 | 2 | 0 | 1 | 15 |
| 24 | (South Africa) Stellenbosch | 0 | 0 | 0 | 3 | 0.5 | 14.5 |
| 25 | (Democratic Republic of the Congo) Maniema Union | 0 | 0 | 0 | 1 | 2 | 14 |
| 26 | (Algeria) CS Constantine | 0 | 0 | 0 | 3 | 0 | 12 |
| 27 | (Angola) Sagrada Esperança | 1 | 0 | 1 | 2 | 0 | 12 |
| 28 | (Republic of the Congo) AS Otôho | 1 | 0 | 0 | 0 | 2 | 11 |
| 29 | (Algeria) JS Kabylie | 0 | 3 | 0 | 0 | 1 | 11 |
| 30 | (Zambia) Power Dynamos | 0 | 0 | 0 | 0 | 2 | 10 |
| 31 | (Mali) Djoliba | 0 | 0 | 0 | 1 | 1 | 9 |
| 32 | (Ghana) Dreams FC | 0 | 0 | 3 | 0 | 0 | 9 |
| 33 | (Democratic Republic of the Congo) Saint-Éloi Lupopo | 0 | 1 | 0 | 0 | 1 | 7 |
| 34 | (Egypt) Future | 0 | 0.5 | 2 | 0 | 0 | 7 |
| 35 | (Libya) Abu Salim | 0 | 0 | 2 | 0 | 0 | 6 |
| 35 | (Mauritania) FC Nouadhibou | 0 | 0 | 2 | 0 | 0 | 6 |
| 37 | (South Africa) Marumo Gallants | 0 | 3 | 0 | 0 | 0 | 6 |
| 38 | (Tanzania) Azam | 0 | 0 | 0 | 0 | 1 | 5 |
| 38 | (South Africa) Kaizer Chiefs | 0 | 0 | 0 | 0 | 1 | 5 |
| 40 | (Tunisia) Étoile du Sahel | 2 | 0 | 1 | 0 | 0 | 5 |
| 41 | (Guinea) Horoya | 1 | 2 | 0 | 0 | 0 | 5 |
| 42 | (Angola) Bravos do Maquis | 0 | 0 | 0 | 1 | 0 | 4 |
| 42 | (Nigeria) Enyimba | 0 | 0 | 0 | 1 | 0 | 4 |
| 42 | (Senegal) ASC Jaraaf | 0 | 0 | 0 | 1 | 0 | 4 |
| 42 | (Angola) Lunda Sul | 0 | 0 | 0 | 1 | 0 | 4 |
| 42 | (Ivory Coast) Stade d'Abidjan | 0 | 0 | 0 | 1 | 0 | 4 |
| 47 | (Botswana) Jwaneng Galaxy | 1 | 0 | 1 | 0 | 0 | 4 |
| 48 | (Tunisia) US Monastir | 0 | 2 | 0 | 0 | 0 | 4 |
| 49 | (Algeria) ES Sétif | 4 | 0 | 0 | 0 | 0 | 4 |
| 50 | (Republic of the Congo) Diables Noirs | 0 | 1 | 0.5 | 0 | 0 | 3.5 |
| 51 | (Tunisia) CS Sfaxien | 1 | 0 | 0 | 0.5 | 0 | 3 |
| 52 | (Libya) Al Hilal Benghazi | 0 | 0 | 1 | 0 | 0 | 3 |
| 52 | (Tunisia) Club Africain | 0 | 0 | 1 | 0 | 0 | 3 |
| 52 | (Ghana) Medeama | 0 | 0 | 1 | 0 | 0 | 3 |
| 52 | (South Africa) Sekhukhune United | 0 | 0 | 1 | 0 | 0 | 3 |
| 56 | (Sudan) Al-Merrikh | 1 | 1 | 0 | 0 | 0 | 3 |
| 57 | (Libya) Al-Ahli Tripoli | 3 | 0 | 0 | 0 | 0 | 3 |
| 58 | (Kenya) Nairobi United | 0 | 0 | 0 | 0 | 0.5 | 2.5 |
| 58 | (Ivory Coast) San Pédro | 0 | 0 | 0 | 0 | 0.5 | 2.5 |
| 58 | (Zambia) ZESCO United | 0 | 0 | 0 | 0 | 0.5 | 2.5 |
| 58 | (Tanzania) Singida Black Stars | 0 | 0 | 0 | 0 | 0.5 | 2.5 |
| 62 | (Cameroon) Coton Sport | 0.5 | 1 | 0 | 0 | 0 | 2.5 |
| 63 | (Botswana) Orapa United | 0 | 0 | 0 | 0.5 | 0 | 2 |
| 63 | (Mozambique) Black Bulls | 0 | 0 | 0 | 0.5 | 0 | 2 |
| 65 | (Mali) Real Bamako | 0 | 1 | 0 | 0 | 0 | 2 |
| 65 | (Togo) ASKO Kara | 0 | 1 | 0 | 0 | 0 | 2 |
| 65 | (Uganda) Vipers | 0 | 1 | 0 | 0 | 0 | 2 |
| 65 | (Democratic Republic of the Congo) AS Vita Club | 0 | 1 | 0 | 0 | 0 | 2 |
| 69 | (Libya) Al Ittihad | 2 | 0 | 0 | 0 | 0 | 2 |
| 69 | (South Africa) AmaZulu | 2 | 0 | 0 | 0 | 0 | 2 |
| 71 | (Angola) Académica do Lobito | 0 | 0 | 0.5 | 0 | 0 | 1.5 |
| 71 | (Guinea) Académie SOAR | 0 | 0 | 0.5 | 0 | 0 | 1.5 |
| 71 | (South Africa) SuperSport United | 0 | 0 | 0.5 | 0 | 0 | 1.5 |
| 74 | (Democratic Republic of the Congo) DC Motema Pembe | 0 | 0.5 | 0 | 0 | 0 | 1 |
| 74 | (Libya) Al Akhdar | 0 | 0.5 | 0 | 0 | 0 | 1 |
| 76 | (Algeria) JS Saoura | 1 | 0 | 0 | 0 | 0 | 1 |
| 77 | (Zambia) Zanaco | 0.5 | 0 | 0 | 0 | 0 | 0.5 |
| 77 | (Niger) USGN | 0.5 | 0 | 0 | 0 | 0 | 0.5 |
| 77 | (Eswatini) Royal Leopards | 0.5 | 0 | 0 | 0 | 0 | 0.5 |

== Club ranking for the 2027–28 CAF club season ==
The club ranking is used for seeding in the CAF Champions League and the CAF Confederation Cup.Pending equality in ranking points, the team receiving more points in the most recent season is considered as the higher-ranked team.

The club ranking for the 2027–28 CAF Champions League and the 2027–28 CAF Confederation Cup is to be based on results from each CAF club competition from the 2022–23 to the 2025–27 seasons.

Legend

Club is still active in 2026-27 CAF Champions League
Club is still active in 2026-27 CAF Confederation Cup

| Rank | Mvt | Club | 2022–23 (× 1) | 2023–24 (× 2) | 2024–25 (× 3) | 2025–26 (× 4) | 2026–27 (× 5) | Total |
|---|---|---|---|---|---|---|---|---|
| 1 | — | (South Africa) Mamelodi Sundowns | 4 | 4 | 5 | 6 | 0 | 51 |
| 2 | — | (Egypt) Al Ahly | 6 | 6 | 4 | 3 | ≥0.5 | ≥44.5 |
| 3 | +1 | (Morocco) RS Berkane | 0 | 4 | 5 | 4 | ≥1 | ≥44 |
| 4 | -1 | (Tunisia) Espérance de Tunis | 4 | 5 | 3 | 4 | ≥1 | ≥44 |
| 5 | — | (Algeria) USM Alger | 5 | 3 | 2 | 5 | ≥0.5 | ≥39.5 |
| 6 | — | (Egypt) Zamalek | 2 | 5 | 2 | 4 | ≥1 | ≥39 |
| 7 | — | (Egypt) Pyramids | 2 | 1 | 6 | 3 | ≥1 | ≥39 |
| 8 | — | (Morocco) AS FAR Rabat | 2 | 0 | 3 | 5 | ≥0.5 | ≥33.5 |
| 9 | — | (Sudan) Al-Hilal | 2 | 2 | 3 | 3 | ≥1 | ≥32 |
| 10 | +1 | (Tanzania) Simba | 3 | 3 | 4 | 1 | ≥1 | ≥30 |
| 11 | +1 | (Tanzania) Young Africans | 4 | 3 | 2 | 2 | ≥1 | ≥29 |
| 12 | -2 | (Algeria) CR Belouizdad | 3 | 2 | 2 | 3 | ≥0 | ≥25 |
| 13 | +4 | (Algeria) MC Alger | 0 | 0 | 3 | 2 | ≥1 | ≥22 |
| 14 | — | (Angola) Petro de Luanda | 2 | 3 | 0 | 2 | ≥1 | ≥21 |
| 15 | +1 | (Mali) Stade Malien | 0 | 2 | 0.5 | 3 | 0 | 17.5 |
| 16 | +3 | (South Africa) Orlando Pirates | 0 | 0 | 4 | 0 | ≥1 | ≥17 |
| 17 | -4 | (Morocco) Wydad AC | 5 | 2 | 0 | 2 | 0 | 17 |
| 18 | -3 | (Ivory Coast) ASEC Mimosas | 3 | 3 | 2 | 0 | 0 | 15 |
| 19 | -1 | (Egypt) Al-Masry | 0 | 0 | 2 | 2 | 0 | 14 |
| 20 | +5 | (Democratic Republic of the Congo) Maniema Union | 0 | 0 | 1 | 2 | ≥0.5 | ≥13.5 |
| 21 | +1 | (Morocco) Olympic Safi | 0 | 0 | 0 | 3 | 0 | 12 |
| 22 | -1 | (Morocco) Raja CA | 3 | 0 | 2 | 0 | ≥0.5 | ≥11.5 |
| 23 | -3 | (Democratic Republic of the Congo) TP Mazembe | 0.5 | 4 | 1 | 0 | 0 | 11.5 |
| 24 | — | (South Africa) Stellenbosch | 0 | 0 | 3 | 0.5 | 0 | 11 |
| 25 | -2 | (Nigeria) Rivers United | 2 | 2 | 0 | 1 | 0 | 10 |
| 26 | +9 | (Mauritania) FC Nouadhibou | 0 | 2 | 0 | 0 | ≥1 | ≥9 |
| 27 | -1 | (Algeria) CS Constantine | 0 | 0 | 3 | 0 | 0 | 9 |
| 28 | — | (Republic of the Congo) AS Otôho | 0 | 0 | 0 | 2 | 0 | 8 |
| 28 | +2 | (Zambia) Power Dynamos | 0 | 0 | 0 | 2 | 0 | 8 |
| 30 | -3 | (Angola) Sagrada Esperança | 0 | 1 | 2 | 0 | 0 | 8 |
| 31 | +21 | (Tunisia) Club Africain | 0 | 1 | 0 | 0 | ≥1 | ≥7 |
| 32 | +9 | (Guinea) Horoya | 2 | 0 | 0 | 0 | ≥1 | ≥7 |
| 33 | -2 | (Mali) Djoliba | 0 | 0 | 1 | 1 | 0 | 7 |
| 34 | -5 | (Algeria) JS Kabylie | 3 | 0 | 0 | 1 | 0 | 7 |
| 35 | +3 | (Tanzania) Azam | 0 | 0 | 0 | 1 | ≥0.5 | ≥6.5 |
| 36 | -4 | (Ghana) Dreams FC | 0 | 3 | 0 | 0 | 0 | 6 |
| 37 | new | (Angola) Wiliete | 0 | 0 | 0 | 0 | ≥1 | ≥5 |
| 37 | new | (Cameroon) Colombe Sportive | 0 | 0 | 0 | 0 | ≥1 | ≥5 |
| 37 | new | (Morocco) Maghreb Fez | 0 | 0 | 0 | 0 | ≥1 | ≥5 |
| 40 | -7 | (Democratic Republic of the Congo) Saint-Éloi Lupopo | 1 | 0 | 0 | 1 | 0 | 5 |
| 41 | +17 | (Tanzania) Singida Black Stars | 0 | 0 | 0 | 0.5 | ≥0.5 | ≥4.5 |
| 42 | -8 | (Egypt) Future | 0.5 | 2 | 0 | 0 | 0 | 4.5 |
| 43 | +8 | (Tunisia) CS Sfaxien | 0 | 0 | 0.5 | 0 | ≥0.5 | ≥4 |
| 43 | +20 | (Mozambique) Black Bulls | 0 | 0 | 0.5 | 0 | ≥0.5 | ≥4 |
| 45 | -7 | (South Africa) Kaizer Chiefs | 0 | 0 | 0 | 1 | 0 | 4 |
| 46 | -11 | (Libya) Abu Salim | 0 | 2 | 0 | 0 | 0 | 4 |
| 47 | +18 | (Mali) Real Bamako | 1 | 0 | 0 | 0 | ≥0.5 | ≥3.5 |
| 47 | +18 | (Togo) ASKO Kara | 1 | 0 | 0 | 0 | ≥0.5 | ≥3.5 |
| 49 | -7 | (Angola) Bravos do Maquis | 0 | 0 | 1 | 0 | 0 | 3 |
| 49 | -7 | (Nigeria) Enyimba | 0 | 0 | 1 | 0 | 0 | 3 |
| 49 | -7 | (Senegal) ASC Jaraaf | 0 | 0 | 1 | 0 | 0 | 3 |
| 49 | -7 | (Angola) Lunda Sul | 0 | 0 | 1 | 0 | 0 | 3 |
| 49 | -7 | (Ivory Coast) Stade d'Abidjan | 0 | 0 | 1 | 0 | 0 | 3 |
| 54 | -17 | (South Africa) Marumo Gallants | 3 | 0 | 0 | 0 | 0 | 3 |
| 55 | +2 | (Libya) Al Ahli | 0 | 0 | 0 | 0 | ≥0.5 | ≥2.5 |
| 55 | new | (Zambia) Red Arrows | 0 | 0 | 0 | 0 | ≥0.5 | ≥2.5 |
| 55 | new | (Angola) Primeiro de Agosto | 0 | 0 | 0 | 0 | ≥0.5 | ≥2.5 |
| 55 | new | (South Africa) Durban City | 0 | 0 | 0 | 0 | ≥0.5 | ≥2.5 |
| 59 | -1 | (Kenya) Nairobi United | 0 | 0 | 0 | 0.5 | 0 | 2 |
| 59 | -1 | (Ivory Coast) San Pédro | 0 | 0 | 0 | 0.5 | 0 | 2 |
| 59 | -1 | (Zambia) ZESCO United | 0 | 0 | 0 | 0.5 | 0 | 2 |
| 62 | -22 | (Tunisia) Étoile du Sahel | 0 | 1 | 0 | 0 | 0 | 2 |
| 62 | -15 | (Botswana) Jwaneng Galaxy | 0 | 1 | 0 | 0 | 0 | 2 |
| 62 | -10 | (Libya) Al Hilal Benghazi | 0 | 1 | 0 | 0 | 0 | 2 |
| 62 | -10 | (Ghana) Medeama | 0 | 1 | 0 | 0 | 0 | 2 |
| 62 | -10 | (South Africa) Sekhukhune United | 0 | 1 | 0 | 0 | 0 | 2 |
| 67 | -17 | (Republic of the Congo) Diables Noirs | 1 | 0.5 | 0 | 0 | 0 | 2 |
| 68 | -20 | (Tunisia) US Monastir | 2 | 0 | 0 | 0 | 0 | 2 |
| 69 | -6 | (Botswana) Orapa United | 0 | 0 | 0.5 | 0 | 0 | 1.5 |
| 70 | +1 | (Angola) Académica do Lobito | 0 | 0.5 | 0 | 0 | 0 | 1 |
| 70 | +1 | (Guinea) Académie SOAR | 0 | 0.5 | 0 | 0 | 0 | 1 |
| 70 | +1 | (South Africa) SuperSport United | 0 | 0.5 | 0 | 0 | 0 | 1 |
| 73 | -17 | (Sudan) Al-Merrikh | 1 | 0 | 0 | 0 | 0 | 1 |
| 73 | -11 | (Cameroon) Coton Sport | 1 | 0 | 0 | 0 | 0 | 1 |
| 73 | -8 | (Uganda) Vipers | 1 | 0 | 0 | 0 | 0 | 1 |
| 73 | -8 | (Democratic Republic of the Congo) AS Vita Club | 1 | 0 | 0 | 0 | 0 | 1 |
| 77 | -3 | (Democratic Republic of the Congo) DC Motema Pembe | 0.5 | 0 | 0 | 0 | 0 | 0.5 |
| 77 | -3 | (Libya) Al Akhdar | 0.5 | 0 | 0 | 0 | 0 | 0.5 |

== Historical rankings since 2011 ==
Legend

- Associations ranked 1–12 and eligible to enter two teams in each CAF club competition.
- — No rank (0 Points)

| Association | Rank (points) | | | | | | | | | | | | | | | | |
| Association | 2011 | 2012 | 2013 | 2014 | 2015 | 2016 | 2017 | 2018 | 2018–19 | 2019–20 | 2020–21 | 2021–22 | 2022–23 | 2023–24 | 2024–25 | 2025-26 | 2026-27 |
|---|---|---|---|---|---|---|---|---|---|---|---|---|---|---|---|---|---|
| Egypt | 2 (83) | 2 (81) | 3 (64) | 2 (70) | 2 (80) | 2 (81) | 2 (80) | 1 (85) | 2 (106.5) | 3 (120.5) | 2 (167) | 2 (173.5) | 2 (176) | 2 (172.5) | 1 (184) | 1 (190.5) | 1 (190) |
| Morocco | 8 (20) | 7 (27) | 4 (62) | 5 (53) | 4 (44) | 7 (29) | 7 (24) | 6 (41) | 4 (84) | 2 (153) | 1 (190) | 1 (183) | 1 (194) | 1 (180) | 2 (148) | 2 (142) | 2 (162) |
| Algeria | 6 (27) | 6 (45) | 7 (43) | 7 (40) | 7 (32) | 4 (44) | 4 (64) | 4 (62) | 5 (82.5) | 4 (92) | 5 (81) | 4 (109) | 3 (115) | 3 (134) | 3 (119) | 4 (130) | 3 (140) |
| South Africa | 14 (10) | 16 (5) | 17 (1) | — | 11 (20) | 12 (16) | 6 (27) | 5 (45) | 6 (78.5) | 6 (76.5) | 6 (68.5) | 5 (93.5) | 5 (109.5) | 4 (114) | 4 (106) | 3 (131) | 4 (127.5) |
| Tanzania | — | — | — | — | — | — | — | 16 (5) | 24 (2) | 12 (18) | 13 (14) | 12 (27.5) | 11 (30.5) | 6 (56.5) | 6 (71) | 5 (82.5) | 5 (83) |
| Tunisia | 1 (98) | 1 (97) | 1 (100) | 1 (85) | 1 (106) | 1 (105) | 1 (100) | 2 (76) | 1 (116) | 1 (154) | 3 (140) | 3 (131) | 4 (113) | 5 (101) | 5 (97) | 6 (82.5) | 6 (73) |
| Angola | 11 (18) | 12 (13) | 9 (18) | 10 (18) | 12 (17) | 13 (11) | 13 (7) | 17 (3) | 17 (6) | 11 (21.5) | 10 (36) | 10 (31.5) | 7 (46) | 8 (41.5) | 8 (51.5) | 7 (55) | 7 (48.5) |
| DR Congo | 5 (46) | 3 (60) | 5 (49) | 6 (48) | 3 (46) | 3 (63) | 3 (69) | 3 (70) | 3 (90) | 5 (87) | 4 (83) | 6 (75) | 6 (63) | 7 (54) | 7 (54) | 8 (45) | 8 (44) |
| Sudan | 4 (50) | 5 (47) | 6 (47) | 4 (54) | 6 (37) | 5 (33) | 5 (51) | 7 (35) | 7 (53) | 8 (35) | 11 (29.5) | 11 (30) | 8 (33.5) | 9 (39) | 9 (37) | 9 (40) | 9 (42) |
| Mali | 8 (20) | 8 (21) | 10 (16) | 8 (31) | 7 (32) | 8 (26) | 9 (23) | 11 (15) | 16 (8) | 26 (3) | 20 (6.5) | 20 (5) | 21 (3.5) | 18 (7) | 15 (15) | 13 (18.5) | 10 (34) |
| Ivory Coast | 7 (22) | 12 (13) | 12 (11) | 15 (6) | 13 (13) | 6 (30) | 9 (23) | 8 (21) | 10 (15) | 13 (15) | 14 (13.5) | 16 (9) | 16 (10.5) | 13 (21) | 11 (30.5) | 10 (38) | 11 (30.5) |
| Nigeria | 3 (75) | 4 (58) | 2 (70) | 3 (63) | 5 (41) | 11 (22) | 12 (12) | 12 (13) | 13 (10.5) | 9 (32.5) | 8 (39) | 8 (37.5) | 12 (26) | 12 (25) | 12 (25) | 12 (21) | 12 (19) |
| Libya | 16 (9) | 10 (16) | 12 (11) | 15 (6) | 16 (4) | 14 (7) | 14 (4) | 14 (8) | 9 (19) | 18 (10) | 12 (16.5) | 15 (13.5) | 9 (33) | 11 (28) | 10 (35) | 11 (24) | 13 (15) |
| Congo | — | — | — | 9 (20) | 9 (21) | 8 (26) | 7 (24) | 10 (16) | 15 (10) | 16 (11.5) | 18 (8) | 19 (5.5) | 17 (8) | 16 (9.5) | 18 (9.5) | 19 (7) | 14 (14.5) |
| Zambia | 14 (10) | 12 (13) | 14 (10) | 14 (7) | 16 (4) | 15 (6) | 14 (4) | 9 (18) | 8 (38) | 7 (40.5) | 7 (43) | 9 (35) | 13 (24.5) | 15 (15) | 20 (7.5) | 24 (2.5) | 15 (13) |
| Ghana | 13 (12) | 15 (6) | 16 (2) | 12 (11) | 14 (8) | 15 (6) | 14 (4) | 15 (7) | 22 (4) | 19 (9) | 20 (6.5) | 23 (4) | 24 (2.5) | 27 (1) | 14 (20) | 14 (16) | 16 (12) |
| Guinea | 18 (1) | — | — | — | — | — | — | — | 18 (5) | 10 (30) | 9 (38) | 7 (38) | 10 (31) | 10 (29) | 13 (20.5) | 15 (12) | 17 (6.5) |
| Botswana | — | — | — | — | — | — | — | — | — | 24 (4) | 25 (3) | 27 (2) | 18 (6) | 21 (4) | 19 (8) | 16 (8.5) | 18 (6) |
| Mauritania | — | — | — | — | — | — | — | — | — | — | 27 (2.5) | 27 (2) | 28 (1.5) | 27 (1) | 17 (10.5) | 18 (8) | 18 (6) |
| Senegal | — | — | — | — | — | — | — | — | — | — | — | 14 (15) | 15 (12) | 17 (9) | 21 (6) | 17 (8) | 20 (4) |
| Kenya | — | — | — | — | — | — | — | — | — | 14 (14) | 15 (11) | 17 (8) | 19 (5) | 23 (2) | — | — | 21 (2.5) |
| Cameroon | 10 (19) | 11 (14) | 8 (19) | 11 (12) | 9 (21) | 8 (26) | 11 (19) | 13 (12) | 10 (15) | 26 (3) | 29 (2) | 13 (16) | 14 (14.5) | 14 (16) | 16 (11.5) | 20 (7) | 21 (2.5) |
| Mozambique | — | — | — | — | — | — | — | — | 10 (15) | 15 (13) | 17 (9) | 20 (5) | 30 (1) | — | — | 23 (2.5) | 23 (2) |
| Togo | — | — | — | — | — | — | — | — | — | 24 (4) | 25 (3) | 27 (2) | 30 (1) | 19 (5) | 22 (4) | 21 (3) | 23 (2) |
| Uganda | — | — | — | — | — | — | — | — | 18 (5) | 17 (11) | 18 (8) | 20 (5) | 26 (2) | 19 (5) | 22 (4) | 22 (3) | 23 (2) |
| Eswatini | — | — | — | — | — | — | — | — | 18 (5) | 22 (7) | 23 (5) | 26 (3) | 21 (3.5) | 23 (2) | 24 (1.5) | 25 (1) | 26 (0.5) |
| Niger | — | 16 (5) | 15 (4) | 17 (3) | 19 (2) | 18 (1) | — | — | — | — | — | — | 24 (2.5) | 23 (2) | 24 (1.5) | 25 (1) | 26 (0.5) |
| Burkina Faso | 18 (1) | — | — | — | — | — | — | — | — | 28 (2.5) | 29 (2) | 23 (4) | 23 (3) | 23 (2) | 26 (1) | 27 (0.5) | — |
| Zimbabwe | 12 (17) | 9 (18) | 11 (13) | 13 (8) | 18 (3) | 18 (1) | — | — | 18 (5) | 20 (8) | 15 (11) | 17 (8) | 19 (5) | 22 (3) | 26 (1) | — | — |
| Benin | — | — | — | — | — | — | — | — | — | — | 27 (2.5) | 27 (2) | 28 (1.5) | 27 (1) | 28 (0.5) | — | — |
| Rwanda | — | — | — | — | — | — | — | — | — | 20 (8) | 22 (6) | 23 (4) | 26 (2) | — | — | — | — |
| Ethiopia | — | — | — | — | 15 (5) | 17 (4) | 17 (3) | 18 (2) | 13 (10.5) | 23 (6) | 24 (4) | 27 (2) | — | — | — | — | — |
| Gabon | 18 (1) | — | — | — | — | — | — | — | 23 (2.5) | 29 (1.5) | 31 (1) | 32 (0.5) | — | — | — | — | — |
| Equatorial Guinea | 17 (2) | 18 (1) | — | — | — | — | — | — | — | — | — | — | — | — | — | — | — |

Note: For associations which have the same number of points, they are listed as having the same rank as CAF did not publish any tiebreaking criteria. There was a tie for determining the 12th ranked association on two occasions:

- In 2012, Ivory Coast received two entries in each tournament, while Angola and Zambia only received one entry in each.
- In 2013, Ivory Coast received two entries in each tournament, while Libya only received one entry in each.

== Club results ==
Club results of the previous 5 seasons and the current season based on the current points system are as follows:

| | | 6 points | 5 points | 4 points | 3 points | 2 points | 1 point | 0.5 point |
|---|---|---|---|---|---|---|---|---|
| 2020–21 | CL | (Egypt) Al-Ahly | (South Africa) Kaizer Chiefs | (Morocco) Wydad AC; (Tunisia) Espérance de Tunis | (Algeria) CR Belouizdad; (Algeria) MC Alger; (South Africa) Mamelodi Sundowns; (Tanzania) Simba | (Democratic Republic of the Congo) AS Vita Club; (Democratic Republic of the Congo) TP Mazembe; (Egypt) Zamalek; (Guinea) Horoya | (Angola) Petro de Luanda; (Senegal) Teungueth; (Sudan) Al-Hilal; (Sudan) Al-Merrikh | |
| 2020–21 | CC | | (Morocco) Raja CA | (Algeria) JS Kabylie | (Cameroon) Coton Sport; (Egypt) Pyramids | (Nigeria) Enyimba; (Senegal) ASC Jaraaf; (South Africa) Orlando Pirates; (Tunisia) CS Sfaxien | (Algeria) ES Sétif; (Morocco) RS Berkane; (Tunisia) Étoile du Sahel; (Zambia) Nkana | (Burkina Faso) Salitas; (Libya) Al Ahly Benghazi; (Tanzania) Namungo; (Zambia) NAPSA Stars |
| 2021–22 | CL | (Morocco) Wydad AC | (Egypt) Al-Ahly | (Angola) Petro de Luanda; (Algeria) ES Setif | (Morocco) Raja CA; (South Africa) Mamelodi Sundowns; (Algeria) CR Belouizdad; (Tunisia) Esperance de Tunis | (South Africa) AmaZulu; (Tunisia) Étoile du Sahel; (Egypt) Zamalek; (Sudan) Al Hilal | (Guinea) Horoya AC; (Sudan) Al Merrikh; (Angola) Sagrada Esperança; (Botswana) Jwaneng Galaxy | |
| 2021–22 | CC | | (Morocco) RS Berkane | (South Africa) Orlando Pirates | (Libya) Al-Ahli Tripoli; (Democratic Republic of the Congo) TP Mazembe | (Tanzania) Simba SC; (Egypt) Al Masry SC; (Libya) Al Ittihad; (Egypt) Pyramids FC | (Algeria) JS Saoura; (Ivory Coast) ASEC Mimosas; (Republic of the Congo) AS Otohô; (Tunisia) CS Sfaxien | (Niger) USGN; (Cameroon) Coton Sport FC; (Zambia) Zanaco; (Eswatini) Royal Leopards |
| 2022–23 | CL | (Egypt) Al Ahly | (Morocco) Wydad AC | (South Africa) Mamelodi Sundowns; (Tunisia) Espérance de Tunis | (Algeria) CR Belouizdad; (Algeria) JS Kabylie; (Morocco) Raja CA; (Tanzania) Simba | (Angola) Petro de Luanda; (Egypt) Zamalek; (Guinea) Horoya; (Sudan) Al Hilal | (Democratic Republic of the Congo) AS Vita Club; (Cameroon) Coton Sport; (Sudan) Al Merrikh; (Uganda) Vipers | |
| 2022–23 | CC | | (Algeria) USM Alger | (Tanzania) Young Africans | (Ivory Coast) ASEC Mimosas; (South Africa) Marumo Gallants | (Egypt) Pyramids; (Morocco) ASFAR; (Nigeria) Rivers United; (Tunisia) US Monastir | (Republic of the Congo) Diables Noirs; (Democratic Republic of the Congo) Saint-Éloi Lupopo; (Mali) Real Bamako; (Togo) ASKO Kara | (Democratic Republic of the Congo) Motema Pembe; (Democratic Republic of the Congo) TP Mazembe; (Egypt) Future; (Libya) Al Akhdar |
| 2023–24 | CL | (Egypt) Al Ahly | (Tunisia) Espérance de Tunis | (South Africa) Mamelodi Sundowns; (Democratic Republic of the Congo) TP Mazembe | (Ivory Coast) ASEC Mimosas; (Angola) Petro de Luanda; (Tanzania) Simba; (Tanzania) Young Africans | (Mauritania) FC Nouadhibou; (Morocco) Wydad AC; (Sudan) Al Hilal; (Algeria) CR Belouizdad | (Egypt) Pyramids; (Botswana) Jwaneng Galaxy; (Tunisia) Étoile du Sahel; (Ghana) Medeama | |
| 2023–24 | CC | | (Egypt) Zamalek | (Morocco) RS Berkane | (Algeria) USM Alger; (Ghana) Dreams FC | (Egypt) Modern Future; (Libya) Abu Salim; (Nigeria) Rivers United; (Mali) Stade Malien | (Libya) Al Hilal Benghazi; (Angola) Sagrada Esperança; (Tunisia) Club Africain; (South Africa) Sekhukhune United | (South Africa) SuperSport United; (Guinea) Académie SOAR; (Angola) Académica do Lobito; (Republic of the Congo) Diables Noirs |
| 2024–25 | CL | (Egypt) Pyramids | (South Africa) Mamelodi Sundowns | (Egypt) Al Ahly; (South Africa) Orlando Pirates | (Tunisia) Espérance Sportive de Tunis; (Sudan) Al Hilal; (Algeria) MC Alger; (Morocco) AS FAR | (Tanzania) Young Africans; (Morocco) Raja CA; (Algeria) CR Belouizdad; (Angola) Sagrada Esperança | (Democratic Republic of the Congo) TP Mazembe; (Democratic Republic of the Congo) AS Maniema Union; (Ivory Coast) Stade d'Abidjan; (Mali) Djoliba | |
| 2024–25 | CC | | (Morocco) RS Berkane | (Tanzania) Simba | (Algeria) CS Constantine; (South Africa) Stellenbosch | (Ivory Coast) ASEC Mimosas; (Algeria) USM Alger; (Egypt) Al Masry; (Egypt) Zamalek | (Angola) Bravos; (Angola) Desportivo da LS; (Senegal) ASC Jaraaf; (Nigeria) Enyimba | (Tunisia) CS Sfaxien; (Mali) Stade Malien; (Botswana) Orapa United; (Mozambique) Black Bulls |
| 2025–26 | CL | (South Africa) Mamelodi Sundowns | (Morocco) ASFAR | (Morocco) RS Berkane; (Tunisia) Espérance Sportive de Tunis | (Egypt) Pyramids; (Egypt) Al Ahly; (Mali) Stade Malien; (Sudan) Al-Hilal | (Tanzania) Young Africans; (Zambia) Power Dynamos; (Algeria) MC Alger; (Angola) Petro de Luanda | (Tanzania) Simba; (Democratic Republic of the Congo) Saint-Éloi Lupopo; (Algeria) JS Kabylie; (Nigeria) Rivers United | |
| 2025–26 | CC | | (Algeria) USM Alger | (Egypt) Zamalek | (Algeria) CR Belouizdad; (Morocco) Olympic Safi | (Morocco) Wydad AC; (Democratic Republic of the Congo) AS Maniema Union; (Egypt) Al Masry; (Republic of the Congo) AS Otohô | (South Africa) Kaizer Chiefs; (South Africa) Stellenbosch; (Tanzania) Azam; (Mali) Djoliba | (Tanzania) Singida Black Stars; (Zambia) ZESCO United; (Ivory Coast) San Pédro; (Kenya) Nairobi United |

If a team was disqualified, they will not obtain any ranking points. For example, ES Sétif were disqualified from the 2016 CAF Champions League during the group stage. As a result, they did not obtain a position for that edition and thus were not counted when calculating the ranking for Algeria.

== See also ==
- AFC club competitions ranking, a similar system used by the Asian Football Confederation
- CAF clubs of the 20th century
- CONMEBOL club ranking of the Copa Libertadores, a similar system used by CONMEBOL
- UEFA coefficient, a similar system used by UEFA
