= 2025–26 CAF Confederation Cup qualifying rounds =

International football competition in Africa

- Dates: 16 September – 26 October 2025

Tournament statistics
- Matches played: 84
- Goals scored: 212 (2.52 per match)

The 2025–26 CAF Confederation Cup qualifying rounds began on 16 September and ended on 26 October 2025, with 58 football teams that competed for the 16 group stage places of the 2025–26 CAF Confederation Cup.

All times are local.

== Draw ==
The draw for the qualifying rounds was held on 9 August 2025, 10:00 GMT (13:00 local time, UTC+3), at Azam TV studios in Dar es Salaam, Tanzania.

With 58 teams registered, six clubs – including former continental champions and recent finalists – have received byes into the Second Preliminary Round based on their CAF 5-year ranking. The remaining teams have been divided into three pots according to their CAF Club Ranking and geographical proximity, taking into account their regional unions.

Second round (6 teams)	First round (52 teams)	
(Egypt) Zamalek (42 pts); (Morocco) Wydad AC (39 pts); (Algeria) USM Alger (37 pts); (Algeria) CR Belouizdad (36 pts); (South Africa) Stellenbosch (15 pts); (Egypt) Al Masry (14 pts)	Ranked teams (6 teams)	Pot 1 (17 teams)
(Egypt) Zamalek (42 pts); (Morocco) Wydad AC (39 pts); (Algeria) USM Alger (37 pts); (Algeria) CR Belouizdad (36 pts); (South Africa) Stellenbosch (15 pts); (Egypt) Al Masry (14 pts)	(Tunisia) Étoile du Sahel (9 pts); (Botswana) Jwaneng Galaxy (6 pts); (Mali) Djoliba (5 pts); (South Africa) Kaizer Chiefs (5 pts); (Republic of the Congo) AS Otohô (2 pts); (Eswatini) Royal Leopards (1.5 pts)	(Benin) Coton FC; (Burkina Faso) USFA; (Cameroon) Aigle Royal; (Ghana) Asante Kotoko; (Guinea) Hafia; (Ivory Coast) AFAD Djékanou; (Ivory Coast) San Pédro; (Liberia) Black Man Warrior; (Mauritania) ASC Snim; (Morocco) Olympic Safi; (Niger) ASN Nigelec; (Nigeria) Abia Warriors; (Nigeria) Kwara United; (Senegal) Génération Foot; (Sierra Leone) Bhantal; (Togo) AS Gbohloé-Su; (Tunisia) Stade Tunisien
(Egypt) Zamalek (42 pts); (Morocco) Wydad AC (39 pts); (Algeria) USM Alger (37 pts); (Algeria) CR Belouizdad (36 pts); (South Africa) Stellenbosch (15 pts); (Egypt) Al Masry (14 pts)	Pot 2 (15 teams)	Pot 3 (14 teams)
(Egypt) Zamalek (42 pts); (Morocco) Wydad AC (39 pts); (Algeria) USM Alger (37 pts); (Algeria) CR Belouizdad (36 pts); (South Africa) Stellenbosch (15 pts); (Egypt) Al Masry (14 pts)	(Libya) Al Ittihad Tripoli (4 pts) (Note: Teams was not yet known at the time of the draw.); (Libya) Al Akhdar (1.5 pts); (Burundi) Flambeau du Centre; (Djibouti) AS Port; (Ethiopia) Wolaitta Dicha; (Kenya) Nairobi United; (Rwanda) Rayon Sports; (Somalia) Dekedaha; (South Sudan) Al Merreikh Juba; (Sudan) Al Ahli Madani; (Sudan) Al Zamala; (Tanzania) Azam; (Tanzania) Singida Black Stars; (Uganda) NEC FC; (Zanzibar) KMKM	(Democratic Republic of the Congo) Maniema Union (5 pts); (Angola) Primeiro de Agosto; (Angola) Kabuscorp; (Comoros) Djabal d'Iconi; (Democratic Republic of the Congo) AS Simba; (Equatorial Guinea) 15 de Agosto; (Gabon) FC 105 Libreville; (Madagascar) AS Fanalamanga; (Malawi) Mighty Wanderers; (Mauritius) Pamplemousses; (Mozambique) Ferroviário de Maputo; (Namibia) Young African; (Seychelles) Foresters Mont Fleuri; (Zambia) ZESCO United

== Format ==
In the qualifying rounds, each tie was played on a home-and-away two-legged basis. If the aggregate score was tied after the second leg, the away goals rule was applied, and if still tied, extra time was not played, and a penalty shoot-out was used to determine the winner (Regulations III. 13 & 14).

== Schedule ==
The schedule of the competition was as follows.

Schedule for the 2025–26 CAF Confederation Cup qualifying rounds
Round	Draw date	First leg	Second leg
First round	9 August 2025	19–21 September 2025	26–28 September 2025
Second round	9 August 2025	17–19 October 2025	24–26 October 2025

== Bracket ==
The bracket of the draw was announced by CAF on 9 August 2025. The 16 winners of the second round advanced to the group stage.

First round					Second round
1	(Ghana) Asante Kotoko	4	1	5
4	(Nigeria) Kwara United	3	0	3
4	(Nigeria) Kwara United	3	0	3	(Ghana) Asante Kotoko	0	1	1
					(Morocco) Wydad AC	1	5	6

First round					Second round
1	(Senegal) Génération Foot	1	3	4
4	(Ivory Coast) AFAD Djékanou	1	5	6
4	(Ivory Coast) AFAD Djékanou	1	5	6	(Ivory Coast) AFAD Djékanou	1	0	1
					(Algeria) USM Alger	0	3	3

First round					Second round
1	(Sierra Leone) Bhantal	0	3	3
4	(Guinea) Hafia	3	2	5
4	(Guinea) Hafia	3	2	5	(Guinea) Hafia	1	0	1
					(Algeria) CR Belouizdad	1	2	3

First round
1	(Burkina Faso) USFA	1	2	3
4	(Togo) AS Gbohloé-Su	0	0	0
3	(Nigeria) Abia Warriors	1	0	1
2	(Mali) Djoliba	1	1	2

Second round
(Burkina Faso) USFA	0	1	1
(Mali) Djoliba	0	2	2

First round
1	(Niger) ASN Nigelec	0	0	0
4	(Morocco) Olympic Safi	1	5	6
3	(Tunisia) Stade Tunisien	2	0	2
2	(Mauritania) ASC Snim	0	0	0

Second round
(Morocco) Olympic Safi	2	1	3
(Tunisia) Stade Tunisien	0	2	2

First round
1	(Cameroon) Aigle Royal	0	2	2
4	(Ivory Coast) San Pédro	1	2	3
3	(Liberia) Black Man Warrior	0	1	1
2	(Benin) Coton FC	0	4	4

Second round
(Ivory Coast) San Pédro	1	3	4
(Benin) Coton FC	1	0	1

First round					Second round
1	(Somalia) Dekedaha	1	1	2
4	(Sudan) Al Zamala	0	2	2
4	(Sudan) Al Zamala	0	2	2	(Somalia) Dekedaha	0	0	0
					(Egypt) Zamalek	6	1	7

First round					Second round
1	(Ethiopia) Wolaitta Dicha	0	1	1
4	(Libya) 'Al Ittihad Tripoli	0	3	3
4	(Libya) 'Al Ittihad Tripoli	0	3	3	(Libya) Al Ittihad Tripoli	0	1	1
					(Egypt) Al Masry	0	2	2

First round
1	(Uganda) NEC FC	2	1	3
4	(Kenya) Nairobi United (a)	2	1	3
3	(Sudan) Al Ahli Madani	1	0	1
2	(Tunisia) Étoile du Sahel	0	3	3

Second round
(Kenya) Nairobi United (p)	2	0	2 (7)
(Tunisia) Étoile du Sahel	0	2	2 (6)

First round
1	(Djibouti) AS Port	1	1	2
4	(Zanzibar) KMKM	2	2	4
3	(South Sudan) Al Merreikh Juba	0	0	0
2	(Tanzania) Azam	2	2	4

Second round
(Zanzibar) KMKM	0	0	0
(Tanzania) Azam	2	7	9

First round
1	(Burundi) Flambeau du Centre	2	2	4
4	(Libya) Al Akhdar	1	2	3
3	(Rwanda) Rayon Sports	0	1	1
2	(Tanzania) Singida Black Stars	1	2	3

Second round
(Burundi) Flambeau du Centre	1	1	2
(Tanzania) Singida Black Stars	1	3	4

First round					Second round
1	(Seychelles) Foresters Mont Fleuri	1	0	1
4	(Equatorial Guinea) 15 de Agosto	0	4	4
4	(Equatorial Guinea) 15 de Agosto	0	4	4	(Equatorial Guinea) 15 de Agosto	0	1	1
					(South Africa) Stellenbosch	0	4	4

First round
1	(Gabon) FC 105 Libreville	2	0	2
4	(Zambia) ZESCO United	0	5	5
3	(Malawi) Mighty Wanderers	1	0	1 (5)
2	(Botswana) Jwaneng Galaxy (p)	0	1	1 (6)

Second round
(Zambia) ZESCO United	4	1	5
(Botswana) Jwaneng Galaxy	3	1	4

First round
1	(Democratic Republic of the Congo) AS Simba	1	2	3
4	(Comoros) Djabal d'Iconi	0	0	0
3	(Angola) Kabuscorp	1	0	1 (4)
2	(South Africa) Kaizer Chiefs (p)	0	1	1 (5)

Second round
(Democratic Republic of the Congo) AS Simba	0	1	1
(South Africa) Kaizer Chiefs	0	3	3

First round
1	(Democratic Republic of the Congo) Maniema Union	2	2	4
4	(Mauritius) Pamplemousses	1	2	3
3	(Namibia) Young African	0	0	0
2	(Eswatini) Royal Leopards	2	5	7

Second round
(Democratic Republic of the Congo) Maniema Union (p)	1	1	2 (4)
(Eswatini) Royal Leopards	1	1	2 (3)

First round
1	(Mozambique) Ferroviário de Maputo	1	2	3
4	(Madagascar) AS Fanalamanga	1	1	2
3	(Angola) Primeiro de Agosto	1	0	1
2	(Republic of the Congo) AS Otohô	2	0	2

Second round
(Mozambique) Ferroviário de Maputo	0	0	0
(Republic of the Congo) AS Otohô	1	2	3

== First round ==
The first round, also called the first preliminary round, included the 52 teams that did not receive byes to the second round.

Team 1	Agg.	Team 2	1st leg	2nd leg
Asante Kotoko (Ghana)	5–3	(Nigeria) Kwara United	4–3	1–0
Génération Foot (Senegal)	4–6	(Ivory Coast) AFAD Djékanou	1–1	3–5
Bhantal (Sierra Leone)	3–5	(Guinea) Hafia	0–3	3–2
USFA (Burkina Faso)	3–0	(Togo) AS Gbohloé-Su	1–0	2–0
Abia Warriors (Nigeria)	1–2	(Mali) Djoliba	1–1	0–1
ASN Nigelec (Niger)	0–6	(Morocco) Olympic Safi	0–1	0–5
Stade Tunisien (Tunisia)	2–0	(Mauritania) ASC Snim	2–0	0–0
Aigle Royal (Cameroon)	2–3	(Ivory Coast) San Pédro	0–1	2–2
Black Man Warrior (Liberia)	1–4	(Benin) Coton FC	0–0	1–4
Dekedaha (Somalia)	2–2 (a)	(Sudan) Al Zamala	1–0	1–2
Wolaitta Dicha (Ethiopia)	1–3	(Libya) Al Ittihad Tripoli	0–0	1–3
NEC FC (Uganda)	3–3 (a)	(Kenya) Nairobi United	2–2	1–1
Al Ahli Madani (Sudan)	1–3	(Tunisia) Étoile du Sahel	1–0	0–3
AS Port (Djibouti)	2–4	(Zanzibar) KMKM	1–2	1–2
El Merreikh Bentiu (South Sudan)	0–4	(Tanzania) Azam	0–2	0–2
Flambeau du Centre (Burundi)	4–3	(Libya) Al Akhdar	2–1	2–2
Rayon Sports (Rwanda)	1–3	(Tanzania) Singida Black Stars	0–1	1–2
Foresters Mont Fleuri (Seychelles)	1–4	(Equatorial Guinea) 15 de Agosto	1–0	0–4
FC 105 Libreville (Gabon)	2–5	(Zambia) ZESCO United	2–0	0–5
Mighty Wanderers (Malawi)	1–1 (5–6 p)	(Botswana) Jwaneng Galaxy	1–0	0–1
AS Simba (Democratic Republic of the Congo)	3–0	(Comoros) Djabal d'Iconi	1–0	2–0
Kabuscorp (Angola)	1–1 (4–5 p)	(South Africa) Kaizer Chiefs	1–0	0–1
Maniema Union (Democratic Republic of the Congo)	4–3	(Mauritius) Pamplemousses	2–1	2–2
Young African (Namibia)	0–7	(Eswatini) Royal Leopards	0–2	0–5
Ferroviário de Maputo (Mozambique)	3–2	(Madagascar) AS Fanalamanga	1–1	2–1
Primeiro de Agosto (Angola)	1–2	(Republic of the Congo) AS Otohô	1–2	0–0

21 September 2025
15:00 UTC+0

Asante Kotoko (Ghana)	4–3	(Nigeria) Kwara United
Antwi 18'; A. Amoah 45', 73' (pen.); Ablorh 47'	Report	Aule 34', 45+2'; Shola 85'

Accra Sports Stadium, Accra
26 September 2025
16:00 UTC+1

Kwara United (Nigeria)	0–1	(Ghana) Asante Kotoko
	Report	Gyau 54'

MKO Abiola Stadium, Abeokuta

Asante Kotoko won 5–3 on aggregate.

21 September 2025
18:00 UTC+0

Génération Foot (Senegal)	1–1	(Ivory Coast) AFAD Djékanou
Cabo 14'	Report	Amani 59'

Stade Lat-Dior, Thiès
27 September 2025
16:00 UTC+0

AFAD Djékanou (Ivory Coast)	5–3	(Senegal) Génération Foot
Gnahoua 42'; Amani 52'; Banse 63'; Sebastien 90+2' (o.g.); Kouao 90+7'	Report	Mbodj 27', 28'; Dieng 58'

Alassane Ouattara Stadium, Abidjan

AFAD Djékanou won 6–4 on aggregate.

20 September 2025
16:00 UTC+0

Bhantal (Sierra Leone)	0–3	(Guinea) Hafia
	Report	Sa. Camara 45+2', 46'; S. Bangoura 90+5'

Bo Stadium, Bo
26 September 2025
16:30 UTC+0

Hafia (Guinea)	2–3	(Sierra Leone) Bhantal
5'; 39' (pen.)	Report	11' (pen.); 22'; 85'

Alassane Ouattara Stadium, Abidjan (Ivory Coast)

Hafia won 5–3 on aggregate.

19 September 2025
16:00 UTC+0

USFA (Burkina Faso)	1–0	(Togo) AS Gbohloé-Su
	Report

Stade du 4 Août, Ouagadougou
28 September 2025
15:00 UTC+0

AS Gbohloé-Su (Togo)	0–2	(Burkina Faso) USFA
	Report	Sawadogo 47'; Ky 90+2'

Stade de Kégué, Lomé

USFA won 3–0 on aggregate.

21 September 2025
16:00 UTC+1

Abia Warriors (Nigeria)	1–1	(Mali) Djoliba
Obioma 22'	Report	88'

Godswill Akpabio International Stadium, Uyo
28 September 2025
16:00 UTC+0

Djoliba (Mali)	1–0	(Nigeria) Abia Warriors
30'	Report

Stade Mamadou Konaté, Bamako

Djoliba won 2–1 on aggregate.

19 September 2025
16:00 UTC+1

ASN Nigelec (Niger)	0–1	(Morocco) Olympic Safi
	Report	Koné 90+5'

Stade Général Seyni Kountché, Niamey
27 September 2025
20:00 UTC+1

Olympic Safi (Morocco)	5–0	(Niger) ASN Nigelec
Chemlal 15'; Semmoumy 28'; Koné 34'; Errahouli 44'; El Bahri 72'	Report

Larbi Zaouli Stadium, Casablanca

Olympic Safi won 6–0 on aggregate.

20 September 2025
19:00 UTC+1

Stade Tunisien (Tunisia)	2–0	(Mauritania) ASC Snim
Haboubi 13'; N'Diaye 20'	Report

Hammadi Agrebi Stadium, Tunis
27 September 2025
17:00 UTC+0

ASC Snim (Mauritania)	0–0	(Tunisia) Stade Tunisien
	Report

Nouadhibou Municipal Stadium, Nouadhibou

Stade Tunisien won 2–0 on aggregate.

19 September 2025
14:00 UTC+1

Aigle Royal (Cameroon)	0–1	(Ivory Coast) San Pédro
	Report	Kassi Theodore 56'

Ahmadou Ahidjo Stadium, Yaoundé
27 September 2025
16:00 UTC+0

San Pédro (Ivory Coast)	2–2	(Cameroon) Aigle Royal
Dosso 21'; Kamagate 63'	Report	Abanke 67'; Ymele 83'

Laurent Pokou Stadium, San Pédro

San Pédro won 3–2 on aggregate.

21 September 2025
15:30 UTC+0

Black Man Warrior (Liberia)	0–0	(Benin) Coton FC

Samuel Kanyon Doe Sports Complex, Monrovia
26 September 2025
17:00 UTC+0

Coton FC (Benin)	4–1	(Liberia) Black Man Warrior

Stade de Kégué, Lomé (Togo)

Coton FC won 4–1 on aggregate.

21 September 2025
16:00 UTC+3

Dekedaha (Somalia)	1–0	(Sudan) Al Zamala

Nyayo National Stadium, Nairobi (Kenya)
27 September 2025
16:00 UTC+2

Al Zamala (Sudan)	2–1	(Somalia) Dekedaha
Abaker; Oryan

Benina Martyrs Stadium, Benghazi (Libya)

2–2 on aggregate. Dekedaha won on away goals.

19 September 2025
15:00 UTC+3

Wolaitta Dicha (Ethiopia)	0–0	(Libya) Al Ittihad Tripoli

Abebe Bikila Stadium, Addis Ababa
26 September 2025
19:00 UTC+2

Al Ittihad Tripoli (Libya)	3–1	(Ethiopia) Wolaitta Dicha

Tripoli Stadium, Tripoli

Al Ittihad Tripoli won 3–1 on aggregate.

20 September 2025
19:00 UTC+3

NEC FC (Uganda)	2–2	(Kenya) Nairobi United

Nakivubo Stadium, Kampala
27 September 2025
16:00 UTC+3

Nairobi United (Kenya)	1–1	(Uganda) NEC FC

Nyayo National Stadium, Nairobi

3–3 on aggregate. Nairobi United won on away goals.

20 September 2025
16:00 UTC+3

Al Ahli Madani (Sudan)	1–0	(Tunisia) Étoile du Sahel
Senja 90+2'	Report

Azam Complex Stadium, Dar es Salaam (Tanzania)
27 September 2025
16:00 UTC+1

Étoile du Sahel (Tunisia)	3–0	(Sudan) Al Ahli Madani
Anane 4'; Ghedamsi 85'; Ben Choug 90+3'	Report

Sousse Olympic Stadium, Sousse

Étoile du Sahel won 3–1 on aggregate.

21 September 2025
16:15 UTC+3

AS Port (Djibouti)	1–2	(Zanzibar) KMKM

Amaan Stadium, Zanzibar City (Zanzibar)
26 September 2025
16:15 UTC+3

KMKM (Zanzibar)	2–1	(Djibouti) AS Port

Amaan Stadium, Zanzibar City

KMKM won 4–2 on aggregate.

20 September 2025
16:00 UTC+2

El Merreikh Bentiu (South Sudan)	0–2	(Tanzania) Azam

Juba Stadium, Juba
28 September 2025
15:00 UTC+3

Azam (Tanzania)	2–0	(South Sudan) El Merreikh Bentiu

Azam Complex Stadium, Dar es Salaam

Azam won 4–0 on aggregate.

20 September 2025
15:00 UTC+2

Flambeau du Centre (Burundi)	2–1	(Libya) Al Akhdar

Intwari Stadium, Bujumbura
28 September 2025
18:00 UTC+2

Al Akhdar (Libya)	2–2	(Burundi) Flambeau du Centre

Benina Martyrs Stadium, Benghazi

Flambeau du Centre won 4–3 on aggregate.

20 September 2025
18:00 UTC+2

Rayon Sports (Rwanda)	0–1	(Tanzania) Singida Black Stars

Kigali Pelé Stadium, Kigali
27 September 2025
19:00 UTC+3

Singida Black Stars (Tanzania)	2–1	(Rwanda) Rayon Sports

Azam Complex Stadium, Dar es Salaam

Singida Black Stars won 3–1 on aggregate.

16 September 2025
15:00 UTC+1

Foresters Mont Fleuri (Seychelles)	1–0	(Equatorial Guinea) 15 de Agosto
Adeyeri 45'

Estadio de Ebibeyin, Ebibeyin (Equatorial Guinea)
21 September 2025
16:00 UTC+1

15 de Agosto (Equatorial Guinea)	4–0	(Seychelles) Foresters Mont Fleuri

Estadio de Ebibeyin, Ebibeyin

15 de Agosto won 4–1 on aggregate.

20 September 2025
16:00 UTC+1

FC 105 Libreville (Gabon)	2–0	(Zambia) ZESCO United

Stade de Franceville, Franceville
28 September 2025
15:00 UTC+2

ZESCO United (Zambia)	5–0	(Gabon) FC 105 Libreville

Levy Mwanawasa Stadium, Ndola
Referee: Muhammed Marigo (Gambia)

ZESCO United won 5–2 on aggregate.

21 September 2025
15:00 UTC+2

Mighty Wanderers (Malawi)	1–0	(Botswana) Jwaneng Galaxy

Bingu National Stadium, Lilongwe
27 September 2025
19:00 UTC+2

Jwaneng Galaxy (Botswana)	1–0	(Malawi) Mighty Wanderers
Penalties
	6–5

Obed Itani Chilume Stadium, Francistown

1–1 on aggregate. Jwaneng Galaxy won 6–5 on penalties.

28 September 2025
15:00 UTC+2

AS Simba (Democratic Republic of the Congo)	1–0	(Comoros) Djabal d'Iconi

Stade TP Mazembe, Lubumbashi
Referee: Amir Loussif (Tunisia)
4 October 2025
--:-- UTC+3

Djabal d'Iconi (Comoros)	0–2	(Democratic Republic of the Congo) AS Simba

Stade Moroni Malouzini, Moroni

AS Simba won 3–0 on aggregate.

20 September 2025
16:00 UTC+1

Kabuscorp (Angola)	1–0	(South Africa) Kaizer Chiefs

Estádio 11 de Novembro, Luanda
Referee: Lamin Jammeh (Gambia)
27 September 2025
15:00 UTC+2

Kaizer Chiefs (South Africa)	1–0	(Angola) Kabuscorp
Penalties
	5–4

Soccer City, Johannesburg

1–1 on aggregate. Kaizer Chiefs won 6–5 on penalties.

26 September 2025
16:00 UTC+1

Maniema Union (Democratic Republic of the Congo)	2–1	(Mauritius) Pamplemousses

Stade des Martyrs, Kinshasa
3 October 2025
--:-- UTC+4

Pamplemousses (Mauritius)	2–2	(Democratic Republic of the Congo) Maniema Union

National Sports Complex Pitch 1, Saint Pierre

Maniema Union won 4–3 on aggregate.

20 September 2025
15:00 UTC+2

Young African (Namibia)	0–2	(Eswatini) Royal Leopards

Obed Itani Chilume Stadium, Francistown (Botswana)
26 September 2025
15:00 UTC+2

Royal Leopards (Eswatini)	5–0	(Namibia) Young African

Somhlolo National Stadium, Lobamba

Royal Leopards won 7–0 on aggregate.

21 September 2025
15:00 UTC+2

Ferroviário de Maputo (Mozambique)	1–1	(Madagascar) AS Fanalamanga

Estádio do Zimpeto, Maputo
26 September 2025
15:00 UTC+2

AS Fanalamanga (Madagascar)	1–2	(Mozambique) Ferroviário de Maputo

Campo da ABB, Maputo (Mozambique)

Ferroviário de Maputo won 3–2 on aggregate.

21 September 2025
16:00 UTC+1

Primeiro de Agosto (Angola)	1–2	(Republic of the Congo) AS Otohô

Estádio 11 de Novembro, Luanda
28 September 2025
15:30 UTC+1

AS Otohô (Republic of the Congo)	0–0	(Angola) Primeiro de Agosto

Stade Alphonse Massemba-Débat, Brazzaville
Referee: Naim Hosni (Tunisia)

AS Otohô won 2–1 on aggregate.

== Second round ==
The second round, also called the second preliminary round, included 32 teams: the 6 teams that received byes to this round, and the 26 winners of the first round.

Team 1	Agg.	Team 2	1st leg	2nd leg
Asante Kotoko (Ghana)	1–6	(Morocco) Wydad AC	0–1	1–5
AFAD Djékanou (Ivory Coast)	1–3	(Algeria) USM Alger	1–0	0–3
Hafia (Guinea)	1–3	(Algeria) CR Belouizdad	1–1	0–2
USFA (Burkina Faso)	1–2	(Mali) Djoliba	0–0	1–2
Olympic Safi (Morocco)	3–2	(Tunisia) Stade Tunisien	2–0	1–2
San Pédro (Ivory Coast)	4–1	(Benin) Coton FC	1–1	3–0
Dekedaha (Somalia)	0–7	(Egypt) Zamalek	0–6	0–1
Al Ittihad Tripoli (Libya)	1–2	(Egypt) Al Masry	0–0	1–2
Nairobi United (Kenya)	2–2 (7–6 p)	(Tunisia) Étoile du Sahel	2–0	0–2
KMKM (Zanzibar)	0–9	(Tanzania) Azam	0–2	0–7
Flambeau du Centre (Burundi)	2–4	(Tanzania) Singida Black Stars	1–1	1–3
15 de Agosto (Equatorial Guinea)	1–4	(South Africa) Stellenbosch	0–0	1–4
ZESCO United (Zambia)	5–4	(Botswana) Jwaneng Galaxy	4–3	1–1
AS Simba (Democratic Republic of the Congo)	1–3	(South Africa) Kaizer Chiefs	0–0	1–3
Maniema Union (Democratic Republic of the Congo)	2–2 (4–3 p)	(Eswatini) Royal Leopards	1–1	1–1
Ferroviário de Maputo (Mozambique)	0–3	(Republic of the Congo) AS Otohô	0–1	0–2

19 October 2025
15:00 UTC+0

Asante Kotoko (Ghana)	0–1	(Morocco) Wydad AC
	Report	Bakasu 47'

Accra Sports Stadium, Accra
24 October 2025
20:00 UTC+1

Wydad AC (Morocco)	5–1	(Ghana) Asante Kotoko
Hannouri 1'; Aziz Ki 26'; Lorch 54' (pen.); Zemraoui 84' (pen.); Bouchouari 90+1'	Report	Gilbani 18'

Stade Mohammed V, Casablanca

Wydad AC won 6–1 on aggregate.

19 October 2025
16:00 UTC+0

AFAD Djékanou (Ivory Coast)	1–0	(Algeria) USM Alger
Jarju 10'	Report

Alassane Ouattara Stadium, Abidjan
Referee: Abdallah Jammeh (Gambia)
25 October 2025
14:30 UTC+1

USM Alger (Algeria)	3–0	(Ivory Coast) AFAD Djékanou
Ghacha 14', 90+2'; Benzaza 29'	Report

Stade du 5 Juillet, Algiers
Referee: Jean-Pierre Nguiene Bissila (Congo)

USM Alger won 3–1 on aggregate.

19 October 2025
16:00 UTC+0

Hafia (Guinea)	1–1	(Algeria) CR Belouizdad
Camara 62'	Report	Khacef 64'

Stade Lat-Dior, Thiès (Senegal)
Referee: Kossi Fabrice Senyo (Togo)
24 October 2025
18:00 UTC+1

CR Belouizdad (Algeria)	2–0	(Guinea) Hafia
Meziane 54'; Boussouar 68'	Report

Nelson Mandela Stadium, Algiers
Referee: Abdalaziz Yasir Ahmed (Sudan)

CR Belouizdad won 3–1 on aggregate.

19 October 2025
16:00 UTC+0

USFA (Burkina Faso)	0–0	(Mali) Djoliba
	Report

Stade du 4 Août, Ouagadougou
26 October 2025
16:00 UTC+0

Djoliba (Mali)	2–1	(Burkina Faso) USFA
	Report

Stade Mamadou Konaté, Bamako

Djoliba won 2–1 on aggregate.

18 October 2025
19:00 UTC+1

Olympic Safi (Morocco)	2–0	(Tunisia) Stade Tunisien
El Moudane 50'; Koné 85'	Report

El Massira Stadium, Safi
25 October 2025
17:00 UTC+1

Stade Tunisien (Tunisia)	2–1	(Morocco) Olympic Safi
N'Diaye 65' (pen.); Sghaier 90+5'	Report	Eddaou 86'

Hammadi Agrebi Stadium, Tunis

Olympic Safi won 3–2 on aggregate.

18 October 2025
--:-- UTC+0

San Pédro (Ivory Coast)	1–1	(Benin) Coton FC
	Report

Laurent Pokou Stadium, San Pédro
25 October 2025
--:--

Coton FC (Benin)	0–3	(Ivory Coast) San Pédro
	Report

San Pédro won 4–1 on aggregate.

18 October 2025
--:--

Dekedaha (Somalia)	0–6	(Egypt) Zamalek
	Report	Sherif 22'; Alvina 35', 77'; Nasser 37'; Jaziri 65'; Gaafar 83'

24 October 2025
18:00 UTC+3

Zamalek (Egypt)	1–0	(Somalia) Dekedaha
Jaziri 36' (pen.)	Report

Cairo International Stadium, Cairo

Zamalek won 7–0 on aggregate.

17 October 2025
--:-- UTC+2

Al Ittihad Tripoli (Libya)	0–0	(Egypt) Al Masry

26 October 2025
21:00 UTC+3

Al Masry (Egypt)	2–1	(Libya) Al Ittihad Tripoli

Suez Stadium, Suez

Al Masry won 2–1 on aggregate.

19 October 2025
--:-- UTC+3

Nairobi United (Kenya)	2–0	(Tunisia) Étoile du Sahel
	Report

Nyayo National Stadium, Nairobi
26 October 2025
18:00 UTC+1

Étoile du Sahel (Tunisia)	2–0	(Kenya) Nairobi United
	Report
Penalties
	6–7

Sousse Olympic Stadium, Sousse

2–2 on aggregate. Nairobi United won 7–6 on penalties.

18 October 2025
16:15 UTC+3

KMKM (Zanzibar)	0–2	(Tanzania) Azam

24 October 2025
17:00 UTC+3

Azam (Tanzania)	7–0	(Zanzibar) KMKM

Azam won 9–0 on aggregate.

19 October 2025
--:-- UTC+2

Flambeau du Centre (Burundi)	1–1	(Tanzania) Singida Black Stars

25 October 2025
--:--

Singida Black Stars (Tanzania)	3–1	(Burundi) Flambeau du Centre

Singida Black Stars won 4–2 on aggregate.

18 October 2025
--:-- UTC+1

15 de Agosto (Equatorial Guinea)	0–0	(South Africa) Stellenbosch

Estadio de Ebibeyin, Ebibeyin
26 October 2025
--:-- UTC+2

Stellenbosch (South Africa)	4–1	(Equatorial Guinea) 15 de Agosto

Athlone Stadium, Cape Town

Stellenbosch won 4–1 on aggregate.

18 October 2025
--:--

ZESCO United (Zambia)	4–3	(Botswana) Jwaneng Galaxy

25 October 2025
--:-- UTC+2

Jwaneng Galaxy (Botswana)	1–1	(Zambia) ZESCO United

ZESCO United won 5–4 on aggregate.

18 October 2025
--:--

AS Simba (Democratic Republic of the Congo)	0–0	(South Africa) Kaizer Chiefs

Stade TP Mazembe, Lubumbashi
26 October 2025
--:--

Kaizer Chiefs (South Africa)	3–1	(Democratic Republic of the Congo) AS Simba

Dobsonville Stadium, Soweto

Kaizer Chiefs won 3–1 on aggregate.

18 October 2025
--:--

Maniema Union (Democratic Republic of the Congo)	1–1	(Eswatini) Royal Leopards

25 October 2025
--:--

Royal Leopards (Eswatini)	1–1	(Democratic Republic of the Congo) Maniema Union
Penalties
	3–4

2–2 on aggregate. Maniema Union won 4–3 on penalties.

19 October 2025
--:--

Ferroviário de Maputo (Mozambique)	0–1	(Republic of the Congo) AS Otohô

26 October 2025
--:-- UTC+1

AS Otohô (Republic of the Congo)	2–0	(Mozambique) Ferroviário de Maputo

AS Otohô won 3–0 on aggregate.

== See also ==
- 2025–26 CAF Champions League qualifying rounds
