= 2025–26 CAF Confederation Cup =

International football competition in Africa

TotalEnergies CAF Confederation Cup 2025–2026
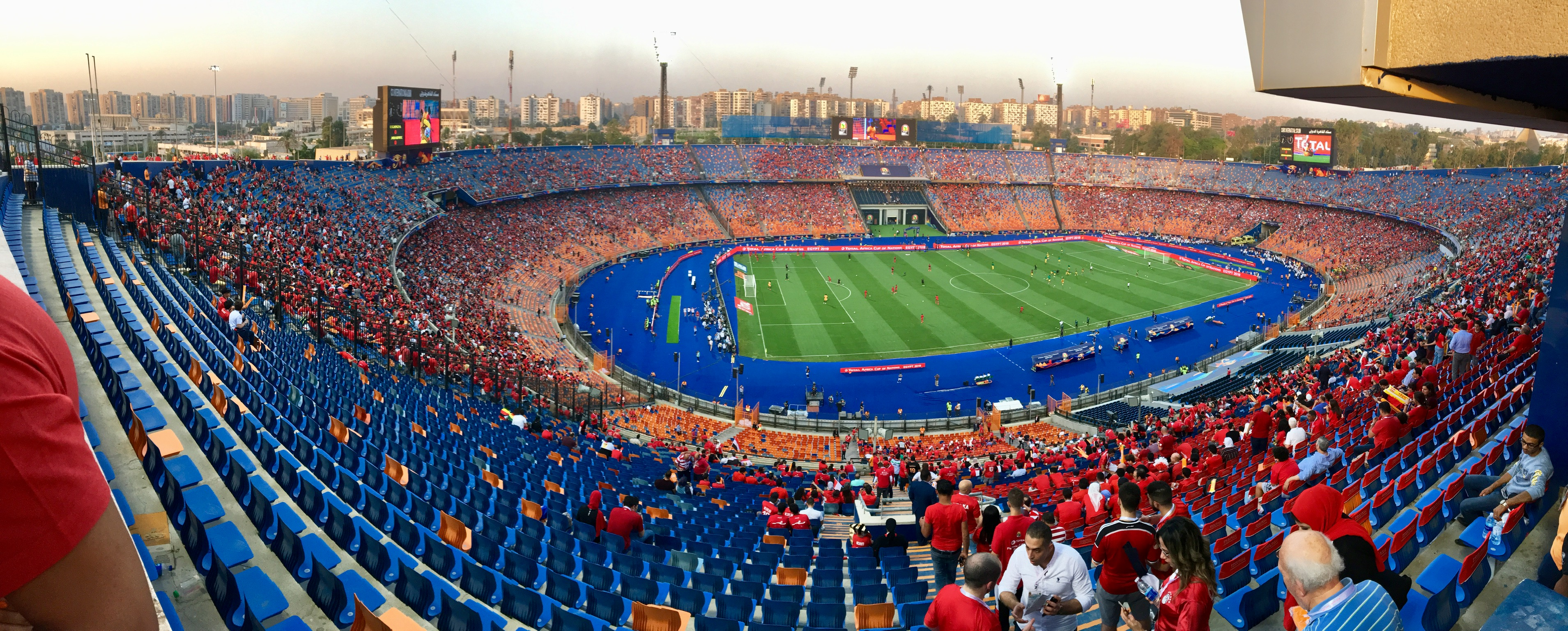
- Cairo International Stadium in Cairo hosted the second leg of the final

Tournament details
- Dates: Qualification: 16 September – 26 October 2025; Competition proper: 22 November 2025 – 16 May 2026
- Teams: 58 (from 46 associations)

Final positions
- Champions: (Algeria) USM Alger (2nd title)
- Runners-up: (Egypt) Zamalek

Tournament statistics
- Matches played: 62
- Goals scored: 123 (1.98 per match)
- Top scorer(s): (Algeria) Abdennour Belhocini (Algeria) Ahmed Khaldi (Palestine) Oday Dabbagh (Morocco) Sofian El Moudane (4 goals)
- (Note: All statistics do not include qualifying rounds)

The 2025–26 CAF Confederation Cup, officially the TotalEnergies CAF Confederation Cup for sponsorship purposes, was the 23rd edition of the CAF Confederation Cup and 51st overall season of Africa's secondary club football tournament organized by the Confederation of African Football (CAF).

The winners of this edition of the competition, USM Alger, earned the right to play against the winners of the 2025–26 CAF Champions League in the 2026 CAF Super Cup.

== Association team allocation ==
All 54 CAF member associations may enter the CAF Confederation Cup, with the 12 highest ranked associations according to the CAF 5-year ranking eligible to enter two teams in the competition. As a result, a maximum of 68 teams could enter the tournament – although this level has never been reached.

For this season's edition, CAF used the 2020–2025 CAF 5-year ranking, which calculates points for each entrant association based on their clubs performance over the 5 years in the CAF Champions League and the CAF Confederation Cup. The criteria for the points are as follows:

	CAF Champions League	CAF Confederation Cup
Winners	6 points	5 points
Runners-up	5 points	4 points
Losing semi-finalists	4 points	3 points
Losing quarter-finalists	3 points	2 points
3rd place in groups	2 points	1 point
4th place in groups	1 point	0.5 point

The points were multiplied by a coefficient according to the season as follows:

- 2024–25: × 5
- 2023–24: × 4
- 2022–23: × 3
- 2021–22: × 2
- 2020–21: × 1

== Teams ==
The following 58 teams from 46 associations entered the competition.

- Bold received a bye to the second round.
- The other teams entered the first round.

Associations are shown according to their CAF 5-year ranking – those with a ranking score have their rank and score (in parentheses) indicated.

Associations eligible to enter two teams (Top 12 associations)
Association	Rank	Team	Qualification method
Egypt	1	Zamalek	2024–25 Egyptian Premier League third place
Egypt	1	Al Masry	2024–25 Egyptian Premier League fourth place
Morocco	2	Wydad AC	2024–25 Botola Pro third place
Morocco	2	Olympic Safi	2023–24 Moroccan Throne Cup winners
South Africa	3	Stellenbosch	2024–25 South African Premiership third place
South Africa	3	Kaizer Chiefs	2024–25 Nedbank Cup champions
Algeria	4	CR Belouizdad	2024–25 Algerian Ligue Professionnelle 1 third place
Algeria	4	USM Alger	2024–25 Algerian Cup champions
Tanzania	5	Azam	2024–25 Tanzanian Premier League third place
Tanzania	5	Singida Black Stars	2024–25 Tanzanian Premier League fourth place
Tunisia	6	Étoile du Sahel	2024–25 Tunisian Ligue Professionnelle 1 third place
Tunisia	6	Stade Tunisien	2024–25 Tunisian Cup runners-up
Angola	7	Primeiro de Agosto	2024–25 Girabola third place
Angola	7	Kabuscorp	2024–25 Taça de Angola champions
DR Congo	8	AS Maniema Union	2024–25 Linafoot third place
DR Congo	8	AS Simba	2024–25 Coupe du Congo Champions
Sudan	9	Al Ahli Madani	2024–25 Sudan Premier League third place
Sudan	9	Al Zamala	2024–25 Sudan Premier League fourth place
Ivory Coast	10	AFAD Djékanou	2024–25 Côte d'Ivoire Ligue 1 third place
Ivory Coast	10	San Pédro	2025 Coupe de Côte d'Ivoire champions
Libya	11	Al Akhdar	2024–25 Libyan Premier League third place
Libya	11	Al Ittihad Tripoli	2024–25 Libyan Premier League fourth place
Nigeria	12	Abia Warriors	2024–25 Nigeria Premier Football League third place
Nigeria	12	Kwara United	2025 Nigeria Federation Cup champions

Associations eligible to enter one team
Association	Rank	Team	Qualifying method
Mali	13	Djoliba	2024–25 Malian Première Division runners-up
Ghana	14	Asante Kotoko	2024–25 Ghana FA Cup champions
Guinea	15	Hafia	2024–25 Guinée Championnat National runners-up
Botswana	16	Jwaneng Galaxy	2025 Botswana FA Challenge Cup winners
Senegal	17	Génération Foot	2025 Senegal FA Cup champions
Mauritania	18	ASC Snim	2024–25 Super D1 runners-up
Congo	19	AS Otohô	2025 Coupe du Congo champions
Cameroon	20	Aigle Royal	2025 Cameroonian Cup champions
Togo	21	AS Gbohloé-Su	2024–25 Togolese Championnat National runners-up
Uganda	22	NEC FC	2024–25 Uganda Premier League runners-up
Mozambique	23	Ferroviário de Maputo	2024 Taça de Mozambique champions
Zambia	24	ZESCO United	2025 ABSA Cup champions
Eswatini	25	Royal Leopards	2025 Ingwenyama Cup champions
Niger	25	ASN Nigelec	2025 Niger Cup champions
Burkina Faso	27	USFA	2024–25 Burkinabé Premier League runners-up
Benin	—	Coton FC	2024–25 Benin Premier League Championship play-off losing finalists
Burundi	—	Flambeau du Centre	2025 Burundian Cup champions
Comoros	—	Djabal d'Iconi	2025 Comoros Cup champions
Djibouti	—	AS Port	2025 Djibouti Cup champions
Equatorial Guinea	—	15 de Agosto	2025 Equatoguinean Cup champions
Ethiopia	—	Wolaitta Dicha	2025 Ethiopian Cup runners-up
Gabon	—	FC 105 Libreville	2024–25 Gabon Championnat National D1 runners-up
Kenya	—	Nairobi United	2025 Kenyan Cup champions
Liberia	—	Black Man Warrior	2025 Liberian FA Cup champions
Madagascar	—	AS Fanalamanga	2024–25 Malagasy Pro League runners-up
Malawi	—	Mighty Wanderers	2024 Super League of Malawi runners-up
Mauritius	—	Pamplemousses	2025 Mauritian Cup runners-up
Namibia	—	Young African	2024–25 Namibia Premiership runners-up
Rwanda	—	Rayon Sports	2024–25 Rwanda Premier League runners-up
Seychelles	—	Foresters Mont Fleuri	2025 Seychelles FA Cup champions
Sierra Leone	—	Bhantal	2024–25 Sierra Leone National Premier League runners-up
Somalia	—	Dekedaha	2024 Somalia Cup champions
South Sudan	—	Al Merreikh Juba	2025 South Sudan National Cup runners-up
Zanzibar	—	KMKM	2025 Zanzibari Cup champions

Associations which did not enter a team

- Central African Republic
- Chad
- Cape Verde
- Eritrea
- Gambia
- Guinea-Bissau
- Lesotho
- Réunion
- São Tomé and Príncipe
- Zimbabwe

== Schedule ==
The schedule of the qualifying tournament is as follows.

Phase	Round	Draw date	First leg	Second leg
Qualifying rounds	First round	9 August 2025	19–21 September 2025	26–28 September 2025
Qualifying rounds	Second round	9 August 2025	17–19 October 2025	24–26 October 2025
Group stage	Matchday 1	3 November 2025	23 November 2025	
Group stage	Matchday 2	3 November 2025	30 November 2025	
Group stage	Matchday 3	3 November 2025	25 January 2026	
Group stage	Matchday 4	3 November 2025	1 February 2026	
Group stage	Matchday 5	3 November 2025	8 February 2026	
Group stage	Matchday 6	3 November 2025	15 February 2026	
Knockout stage	Quarter-finals	17 February 2026	15 March 2026	22 March 2026
Knockout stage	Semi-finals	17 February 2026	12 April 2026	19 April 2026
Knockout stage	Final	17 February 2026	9 May 2026	16 May 2026

== Qualifying rounds ==
The draw for the qualifying rounds was held on 9 August 2025, 10:00 GMT (13:00 local time, UTC+3), at Azam TV studios in Dar es Salaam, Tanzania. In the qualifying rounds, each tie was played on a home-and-away two-legged basis. If the aggregate score was tied after the second leg, the away goals rule was applied, and if still tied, extra time was not played, and a penalty shoot-out was used to determine the winner (Regulations III. 13 & 14).

=== First round ===
Team 1	Agg.	Team 2	1st leg	2nd leg
Asante Kotoko (Ghana)	5–3	(Nigeria) Kwara United	4–3	1–0
Génération Foot (Senegal)	4–6	(Ivory Coast) AFAD Djékanou	1–1	3–5
Bhantal (Sierra Leone)	3–5	(Guinea) Hafia	0–3	3–2
USFA (Burkina Faso)	3–0	(Togo) AS Gbohloé-Su	1–0	2–0
Abia Warriors (Nigeria)	1–2	(Mali) Djoliba	1–1	0–1
ASN Nigelec (Niger)	0–6	(Morocco) Olympic Safi	0–1	0–5
Stade Tunisien (Tunisia)	2–0	(Mauritania) ASC Snim	2–0	0–0
Aigle Royal (Cameroon)	2–3	(Ivory Coast) San Pédro	0–1	2–2
Black Man Warrior (Liberia)	1–4	(Benin) Coton FC	0–0	1–4
Dekedaha (Somalia)	2–2 (a)	(Sudan) Al Zamala	1–0	1–2
Wolaitta Dicha (Ethiopia)	1–3	(Libya) Al Ittihad Tripoli	0–0	1–3
NEC FC (Uganda)	3–3 (a)	(Kenya) Nairobi United	2–2	1–1
Al Ahli Madani (Sudan)	1–3	(Tunisia) Étoile du Sahel	1–0	0–3
AS Port (Djibouti)	2–4	(Zanzibar) KMKM	1–2	1–2
El Merreikh Bentiu (South Sudan)	0–4	(Tanzania) Azam	0–2	0–2
Flambeau du Centre (Burundi)	4–3	(Libya) Al Akhdar	2–1	2–2
Rayon Sports (Rwanda)	1–3	(Tanzania) Singida Black Stars	0–1	1–2
Foresters Mont Fleuri (Seychelles)	1–4	(Equatorial Guinea) 15 de Agosto	1–0	0–4
FC 105 Libreville (Gabon)	2–5	(Zambia) ZESCO United	2–0	0–5
Mighty Wanderers (Malawi)	1–1 (5–6 p)	(Botswana) Jwaneng Galaxy	1–0	0–1
AS Simba (Democratic Republic of the Congo)	3–0	(Comoros) Djabal d'Iconi	1–0	2–0
Kabuscorp (Angola)	1–1 (4–5 p)	(South Africa) Kaizer Chiefs	1–0	0–1
Maniema Union (Democratic Republic of the Congo)	4–3	(Mauritius) Pamplemousses	2–1	2–2
Young African (Namibia)	0–7	(Eswatini) Royal Leopards	0–2	0–5
Ferroviário de Maputo (Mozambique)	3–2	(Madagascar) AS Fanalamanga	1–1	2–1
Primeiro de Agosto (Angola)	1–2	(Republic of the Congo) AS Otohô	1–2	0–0

=== Second round ===
The 16 winners of the second round advanced to the group stage.

Team 1	Agg.	Team 2	1st leg	2nd leg
Asante Kotoko (Ghana)	1–6	(Morocco) Wydad AC	0–1	1–5
AFAD Djékanou (Ivory Coast)	1–3	(Algeria) USM Alger	1–0	0–3
Hafia (Guinea)	1–3	(Algeria) CR Belouizdad	1–1	0–2
USFA (Burkina Faso)	1–2	(Mali) Djoliba	0–0	1–2
Olympic Safi (Morocco)	3–2	(Tunisia) Stade Tunisien	2–0	1–2
San Pédro (Ivory Coast)	4–1	(Benin) Coton FC	1–1	3–0
Dekedaha (Somalia)	0–7	(Egypt) Zamalek	0–6	0–1
Al Ittihad Tripoli (Libya)	1–2	(Egypt) Al Masry	0–0	1–2
Nairobi United (Kenya)	2–2 (7–6 p)	(Tunisia) Étoile du Sahel	2–0	0–2
KMKM (Zanzibar)	0–9	(Tanzania) Azam	0–2	0–7
Flambeau du Centre (Burundi)	2–4	(Tanzania) Singida Black Stars	1–1	1–3
15 de Agosto (Equatorial Guinea)	1–4	(South Africa) Stellenbosch	0–0	1–4
ZESCO United (Zambia)	5–4	(Botswana) Jwaneng Galaxy	4–3	1–1
AS Simba (Democratic Republic of the Congo)	1–3	(South Africa) Kaizer Chiefs	0–0	1–3
Maniema Union (Democratic Republic of the Congo)	2–2 (4–3 p)	(Eswatini) Royal Leopards	1–1	1–1
Ferroviário de Maputo (Mozambique)	0–3	(Republic of the Congo) AS Otohô	0–1	0–2

== Group stage ==
The draw for the group stage was held on 3 November 2025, 11:00 GMT (13:00 local time, UTC+2), in Johannesburg, South Africa. The 16 winners of the second round of qualifying rounds were drawn into four groups of four.

The teams were seeded by their performances in the CAF competitions for the previous five seasons (CAF 5-year ranking points shown next to every team). Each group contained one team from each of Pot 1, Pot 2, and Pot 3, and each team was allocated to the positions in their group according to their pot.

Pot	Pot 1	Pot 2	Pot 3	Pot 4
Teams	(Egypt) Zamalek (42 pts); (Morocco) Wydad AC (39 pts); (Algeria) USM Alger (37 pts); (Algeria) CR Belouizdad (36 pts)	(South Africa) Stellenbosch (15 pts); (Egypt) Al Masry (14 pts); (Democratic Republic of the Congo) Maniema Union (5 pts); (Mali) Djoliba (5 pts)	(South Africa) Kaizer Chiefs (5 pts); (Republic of the Congo) AS Otohô (2 pts)	(Ivory Coast) San Pédro; (Kenya) Nairobi United; (Morocco) Olympic Safi; (Tanzania) Azam; (Tanzania) Singida Black Stars; (Zambia) ZESCO United

In the group stage, each group was played on a home-and-away round-robin basis. The winners and runners-up of each group advanced to the quarter-finals of the knockout stage.

=== Tiebreakers ===
The teams were ranked according to points (3 points for a win, 1 point for a draw, 0 points for a loss). If tied on points, tiebreakers were applied in the following order (Regulations III. 20 & 21):

1. Points in head-to-head matches among tied teams;
2. Goal difference in head-to-head matches among tied teams;
3. Goals scored in head-to-head matches among tied teams;
4. Away goals scored in head-to-head matches among tied teams;
5. If more than two teams were tied, and after applying all head-to-head criteria above, a subset of teams was still tied, all head-to-head criteria above were reapplied exclusively to this subset of teams;
6. Goal difference in all group matches;
7. Goals scored in all group matches;
8. Away goals scored in all group matches;
9. Drawing of lots.

=== Group A ===
Pos	Team	Pld	W	D	L	GF	GA	GD	Pts	Qualification	USMA	OCS	DAC	FCSP
1	(Algeria) USM Alger	6	4	2	0	9	4	+5	14	Advance to knockout stage	—	0–0	2–0	3–2
2	(Morocco) Olympic Safi	6	4	1	1	7	4	+3	13	Advance to knockout stage	0–1	—	2–1	2–1
3	(Mali) Djoliba	6	1	1	4	5	7	−2	4		0–0	0–1	—	4–0
4	(Ivory Coast) San Pédro	6	1	0	5	8	14	−6	3		2–3	0–1	2–0	—

Source: CAF

=== Group B ===
Pos	Team	Pld	W	D	L	GF	GA	GD	Pts	Qualification	WAC	ASMU	AFC	NU
1	(Morocco) Wydad AC	6	5	0	1	9	2	+7	15	Advance to knockout stage	—	1–0	2–0	3–0
2	(Democratic Republic of the Congo) Maniema Union	6	4	0	2	8	3	+5	12	Advance to knockout stage	2–1	—	2–0	3–0
3	(Tanzania) Azam	6	3	0	3	4	6	−2	9		0–1	1–0	—	1–0
4	(Kenya) Nairobi United	6	0	0	6	1	11	−10	0		0–1	0–1	1–2	—

Source: CAF

=== Group C ===
Pos	Team	Pld	W	D	L	GF	GA	GD	Pts	Qualification	CRB	ASO	SFC	SBS
1	(Algeria) CR Belouizdad	6	5	0	1	11	5	+6	15	Advance to knockout stage	—	2–1	2–0	2–0
2	(Republic of the Congo) AS Otohô	6	3	0	3	10	6	+4	9	Advance to knockout stage	4–1	—	3–0	2–1
3	(South Africa) Stellenbosch	6	1	2	3	2	9	−7	5 (Note: Ranked on away goals scored in head-to-head matches: Stellenbosch 1, Singida Black Stars 0.)		0–3	1–0	—	0–0
4	(Tanzania) Singida Black Stars	6	1	2	3	3	6	−3	5		0–1	1–0	1–1	—

Source: CAF

=== Group D ===
Pos	Team	Pld	W	D	L	GF	GA	GD	Pts	Qualification	ZAM	MAS	KCFC	ZUFC
1	(Egypt) Zamalek	6	3	2	1	6	4	+2	11	Advance to knockout stage	—	0–0	2–1	1–0
2	(Egypt) Al Masry	6	3	1	2	9	7	+2	10 (Note: Ranked on goal difference in all group matches: Al Masry +2, Kaizer Chiefs +1.)	Advance to knockout stage	1–2	—	2–1	2–0
3	(South Africa) Kaizer Chiefs	6	3	1	2	7	6	+1	10		1–1	2–1	—	1–0
4	(Zambia) ZESCO United	6	1	0	5	3	8	−5	3		1–0	2–3	0–1	—

Source: CAF

== Knockout stage ==
The mechanism of the draws for each round was as follows:

- In the draw for the quarter-finals, the four group winners were seeded, and the four group runners-up were unseeded. The seeded teams were drawn against the unseeded teams, with the seeded teams hosting the second leg. Teams from the same group could not be drawn against each other, while teams from the same association could be drawn against each other.
- In the draws for the semi-finals, there were no seedings, and teams from the same group or the same association could be drawn against each other. As the draws for the quarter-finals and semi-finals were held together before the quarter-finals were played, the identity of the quarter-final winners was not known at the time of the semi-final draw.

Group	Winners	Runners-up
A	(Algeria) USM Alger	(Morocco) Olympic Safi
B	(Morocco) Wydad AC	(Democratic Republic of the Congo) Maniema Union
C	(Algeria) CR Belouizdad	(Republic of the Congo) AS Otohô
D	(Egypt) Zamalek	(Egypt) Al Masry

=== Bracket ===
The bracket was decided after the draw for the knockout stage, which was held on 17 February 2026, 12:00 GMT (12:00 local time, UTC+2), at the Egyptian Football Association headquarters in Cairo, Egypt.

Quarter-finals
(Democratic Republic of the Congo) Maniema Union	2	0	2
(Algeria) USM Alger (a)	1	1	2
(Morocco) Olympic Safi (a)	1	2	3
(Morocco) Wydad AC	1	2	3
(Egypt) Al Masry	1	0	1
(Algeria) CR Belouizdad (a)	1	0	1
(Republic of the Congo) AS Otohô	1	1	2
(Egypt) Zamalek	1	2	3

Semi-finals
(Algeria) USM Alger (a)	0	1	1
(Morocco) Olympic Safi	0	1	1
(Algeria) CR Belouizdad	0	0	0
(Egypt) Zamalek	1	0	1

Final
(Algeria) USM Alger (p)	1	0	1 (8)
(Egypt) Zamalek	0	1	1 (7)

=== Quarter-finals ===
Team 1	Agg.	Team 2	1st leg	2nd leg
Al Masry (Egypt)	1–1 (a)	(Algeria) CR Belouizdad	1–1	0–0
Olympic Safi (Morocco)	3–3 (a)	(Morocco) Wydad AC	1–1	2–2
AS Otohô (Republic of the Congo)	2–3	(Egypt) Zamalek	1–1	1–2
Maniema Union (Democratic Republic of the Congo)	2–2 (a)	(Algeria) USM Alger	2–1	0–1

=== Semi-finals ===
Team 1	Agg.	Team 2	1st leg	2nd leg
USM Alger (Algeria)	1–1 (a)	(Morocco) Olympic Safi	0–0	1–1
CR Belouizdad (Algeria)	0–1	(Egypt) Zamalek	0–1	0–0

=== Final ===
The first was played on 9 May, and the second leg was played on 16 May 2026.

Team 1	Agg.	Team 2	1st leg	2nd leg
USM Alger (Algeria)	1–1 (8–7 p)	(Egypt) Zamalek	1–0	0–1

9 May 2026
20:00 UTC+1

USM Alger (Algeria)	1–0	(Egypt) Zamalek
Khaldi 90+8' (pen.)	Report

Stade du 5 Juillet, Algiers
Attendance: 50,000
Referee: Dahane Beida (Mauritania)
16 May 2026
21:00 UTC+3

Zamalek (Egypt)	1–0	(Algeria) USM Alger
Dabbagh 5' (pen.)	Report
Penalties
El Said (penalty scored); Abdel Rahim (penalty scored); Abdelmaguid (penalty scored); Mansi (penalty scored); Jaziri (penalty scored); Alvina (penalty scored); El Sayed (penalty scored); Shehata (penalty missed)	7–8	(penalty scored) Draoui; (penalty scored) Khaldi; (penalty scored) Radouani; (penalty scored) Benayad; (penalty scored) Loucif; (penalty scored) Chetti; (penalty scored) Dehiri; (penalty scored) Likonza

Cairo International Stadium, Cairo
Attendance: 46,200
Referee: Pierre Atcho (Gabon)

1–1 on aggregate. USM Alger won 8–7 on penalties.

== Top goalscorers ==
Team eliminated / inactive for this round.

Rank	Player	Team	MD1	MD2	MD3	MD4	MD5	MD6	QF1	QF2	SF1	SF2	F1	F2	Total
1	(Algeria) Abdennour Belhocini	(Algeria) CR Belouizdad	1		1	1	1	1							4
1	(Algeria) Ahmed Khaldi	(Algeria) USM Alger			1				1			1	1		4
1	(Palestine) Oday Dabbagh	(Egypt) Zamalek				1			1	1				1	4
1	(Morocco) Sofian El Moudane	(Morocco) Olympic Safi			1		2			1					4

== See also ==
- 2025–26 CAF Champions League
