= Nairobi United =

Kenyan football club

Nairobi United is a professional football club based in Nairobi, Kenya.

== History ==
Nairobi United won the Kenyan National Super League title in June 2025 to earn promotion to the 2025-26 Premier League, and made it a double when they beat record Kenyan league champions Gor Mahia to win the FKF Cup to qualify for the prestigious 2025–26 CAF Confederation Cup qualifying rounds.

== CAF Confederation Cup ==
Nairobi United FC made history by qualifying for the group stage of the 2025–26 CAF Confederation Cup, marking the club’s first continental appearance.

The Kenyan National Super League winner side advanced after defeating Tunisia’s Étoile Sportive du Sahel 7–6 on penalties. The Tunisian club had won the return leg 2–0 to level the tie 2–2 on aggregate. Nairobi United goalkeeper Kevin Oduor became the hero after saving the hosts’ seventh penalty, before scoring the decisive kick himself. However, Nairobi United did not pass the group stage with Azam F.C. and Singida Black Stars FC.
