= CAF clubs of the 20th century =

On 31 December 2000 the CAF has published that Al Ahly SC is CAF African Club of the Century.

== Ranking ==
The ranking was calculated by the exclusively on the basis of performance by African teams throughout their participation in CAF club competitions (from the quarter-finals to final) from 1964 to 2000. Clubs' performance from the Group Stage of the Champions League, international competition run by CAF since 1997, have been included. Regional competitions organized by football associations members to the organization has not been considered. Clubs' performance on the first edition of the FIFA Club World Cup, held in Brazil in January 2000, has been included in the ranking.

CAF's classification of African clubs is made on the following basis:

Competition	5 Points	4 Points	3 Points	2 Points	1 Point
CAF Champions League; 1997-2000	Champion	Runner up	Semifinalist	3rd in Group Stage	4th in Group Stage
African Cup of Champions Clubs; 1965-1996		Champion	Runner up	Semifinalist	Quarterfinalist
African Cup Winners' Cup; 1975-2000		Champion	Runner up	Semifinalist	Quarterfinalist
CAF Cup; 1992-2000		Champion	Runner up	Semifinalist	Quarterfinalist
CAF Super Cup; 1992-2000					Champion
FIFA Club World Cup; 2000				Each round	

Top Ten Africa's clubs of the 20th Century:

The 'century' classification (Dec 31, 2000):

O----------------------------------------------------------------------------------------O

1. Al-Ahly (Egypt) 40 points

O----------------------------------------------------------------------------------------O

2. Zamalek (Egypt) 37

O----------------------------------------------------------------------------------------O

3. Ashante Kotoko (Ghana) 34

Canon de Yaoundé (Cameroon) 34

O----------------------------------------------------------------------------------------O

5. Espérance (Tunisia) 27

ASEC (Ivory Coast) 27

O----------------------------------------------------------------------------------------O

7. Hearts of Oak (Ghana) 26

O----------------------------------------------------------------------------------------O

8. Africa Sports (Ivory Coast) 25

O----------------------------------------------------------------------------------------O

9. JS Kabylie (Algeria) 22

O----------------------------------------------------------------------------------------O

10. TP Englebert (Congo-K.) 20 [now known as TP Mazembe]

O----------------------------------------------------------------------------------------O

11. ES Sahel (Tunisia) 19

Hafia (Guinea) 19

O----------------------------------------------------------------------------------------O

13. Shooting Stars (Nigeria) 18

O----------------------------------------------------------------------------------------O

14. Raja Casablanca (Morocco) 17

Ismaily (Egypt) 17

AS Vita Club (Congo-K.) 17

O----------------------------------------------------------------------------------------O

17. Al-Mokawloon (Egypt) 16

O----------------------------------------------------------------------------------------O

18. AS FAR (Morocco) 15

Nkana Red Devils (Zambia) 15

O----------------------------------------------------------------------------------------O

Full list published by CAF on 31 December 2000 (top 18)

Nationality is indicated by the corresponding FIFA country code(s).

Based on this statistical study, Egypt's Al-Ahly was named as "African club of the century" by the continental governing body on 31 December 2000.
