= 2022 CAF Confederation Cup final =

African football tournament final

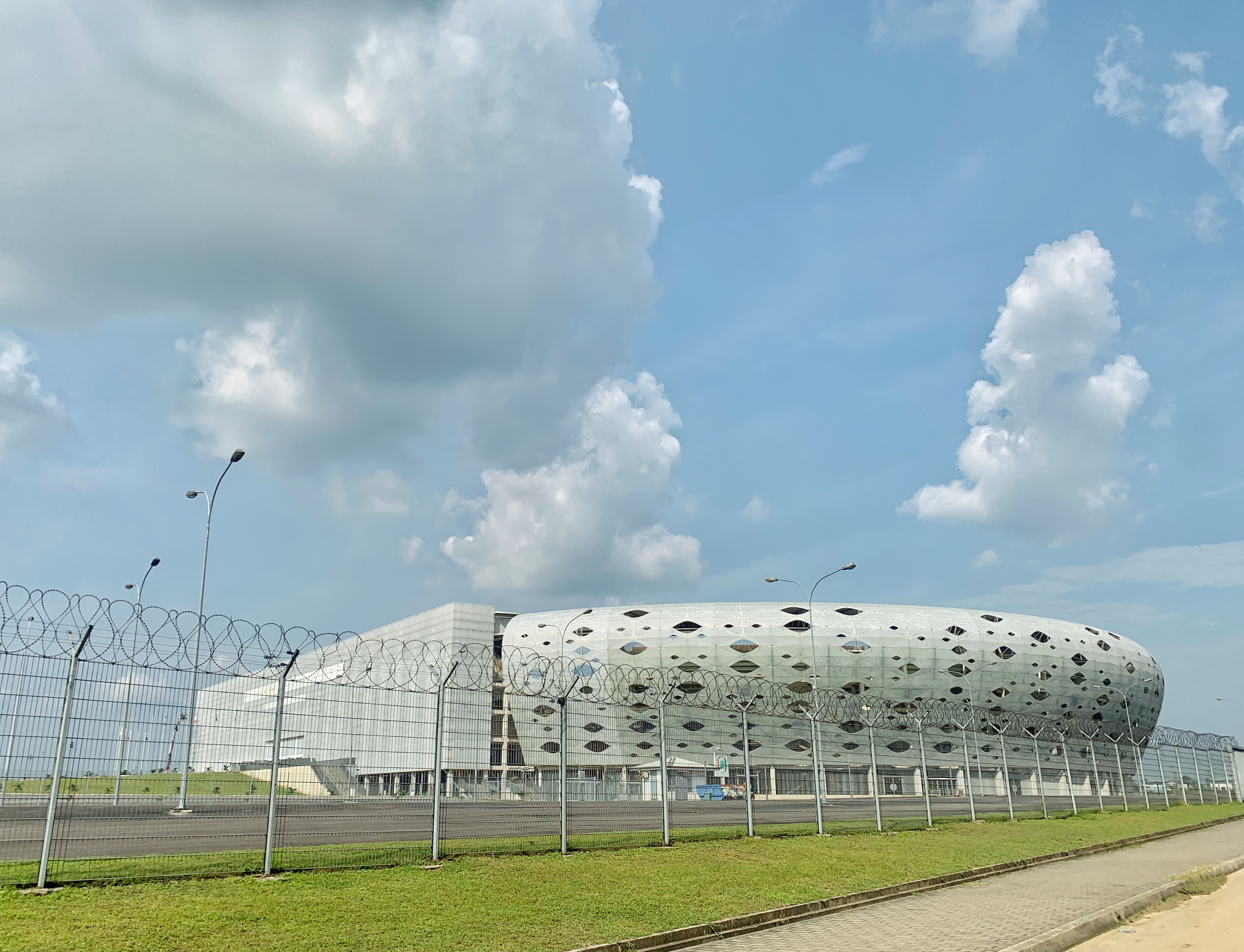
- Godswill Akpabio International Stadium in Uyo, Nigeria, hosted the final.
- Event: 2021–22 CAF Confederation Cup
| Orlando Pirates | RS Berkane |
| (South Africa) | (Morocco) |
| 1 | 1 |
- After extra time RS Berkane won 5–4 on penalties
- Date: 20 May 2022
- Venue: Godswill Akpabio International Stadium, Uyo, Nigeria
- Man of the Match: Thembinkosi Lorch (Orlando Pirates)
- Referee: Janny Sikazwe (Zambia)

The 2022 CAF Confederation Cup final was the final match of the 2021–22 CAF Confederation Cup, the 19th season of Africa's premier club football tournament organised by CAF under the current CAF Confederation Cup title after the merger of CAF Cup and African Cup Winners' Cup. It was played at the Godswill Akpabio International Stadium in Uyo, Nigeria on 20 May 2022.

== Teams ==
| Team | Zone | Previous finals appearances (bold indicates winners) |
|---|---|---|
| (South Africa) Orlando Pirates | COSAFA (Southern Africa) | 1 (2015) |
| (Morocco) RS Berkane | UNAF (North Africa) | 2 (2019, **2020**) |

== Venue ==
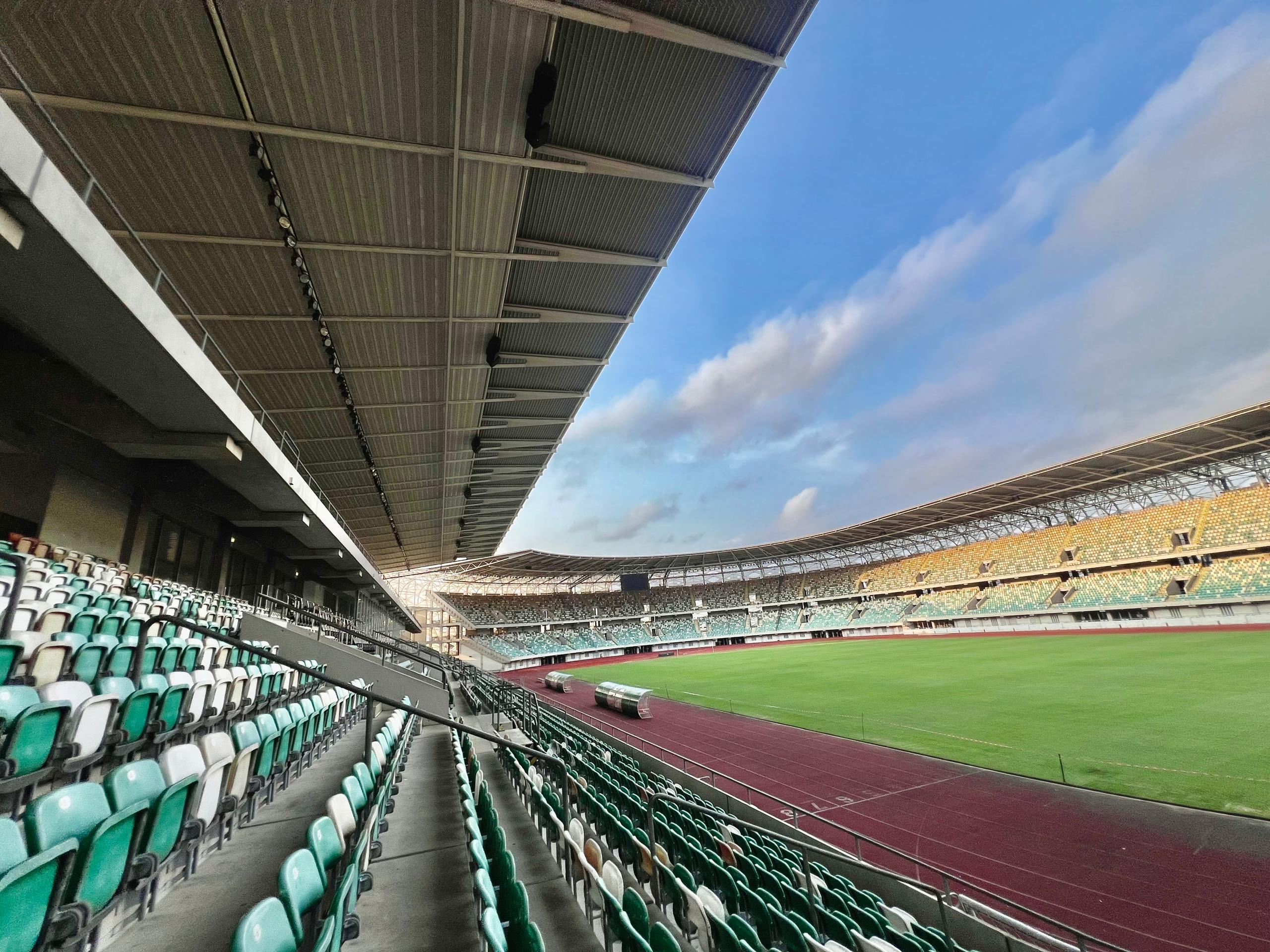
Godswill Akpabio International Stadium in Uyo, Nigeria hosted the match.

For the third consecutive year, the final was played as a single match at a pre-selected venue by CAF instead of a two-legged fixtures format, which was used in the CAF competitions since 1966.

On 11 May 2022, Godswill Akpabio International Stadium in Uyo, Nigeria was chosen by a CAF Executive Committee to host the final.

== Road to the final ==
Note: In all results below, the score of the finalist is given first (H: home; A: away).

| (South Africa) Orlando Pirates | | | | Round | (Morocco) RS Berkane | | | |
|---|---|---|---|---|---|---|---|---|
**Confederation Cup**
| Opponent | Agg. | 1st leg | 2nd leg | Qualifying rounds | Opponent | Agg. | 1st leg | 2nd leg |
| Bye | | | | First round | Bye | | | |
| (Republic of the Congo) CSMD Diables Noirs | 1–0 | 0–0 (A) | 1–0 (H) | Second round | (Tunisia) US Ben Guerdane | 5–0 | 1–0 (A) | 4–0 (H) |
| (Liberia) LPRC Oilers | w/o | 2–0 (A) | — (H) | Play-off round | (Rwanda) APR | 2–1 | 0–0 (A) | 2–1 (H) |
| Opponent | Result | | | Group stage | Opponent | Result | | |
| (Algeria) JS Saoura | 2–0 (H) | | | Matchday 1 | (Niger) USGN | 5–3 (H) | | |
| (Libya) Al Ittihad | 2–3 (A) | | | Matchday 2 | (Ivory Coast) ASEC Mimosas | 1–3 (A) | | |
| (Eswatini) Royal Leopards | 6–2 (A) | | | Matchday 3 | (Tanzania) Simba | 2–0 (H) | | |
| (Eswatini) Royal Leopards | 3–0 (H) | | | Matchday 4 | (Tanzania) Simba | 0–1 (A) | | |
| (Algeria) JS Saoura | 2–0 (A) | | | Matchday 5 | (Niger) USGN | 2–2 (A) | | |
| (Libya) Al Ittihad | 0–0 (H) | | | Matchday 6 | (Ivory Coast) ASEC Mimosas | 1–0 (H) | | |
| **Group B winners**: Pos / Team / Pld / Pts; **1** / (South Africa) Orlando Pirates / **6** / **13**; 2 / (Libya) Al Ittihad / 6 / **11**; 3 / (Algeria) JS Saoura / 6 / **10**; 4 / (Eswatini) Royal Leopards / 6 / **0**; Source: CAF | | | | Final standings | **Group D winners**: Pos / Team / Pld / Pts; **1** / (Morocco) RS Berkane / **6** / **10**; 2 / (Tanzania) Simba / 6 / **10**; 3 / (Ivory Coast) ASEC Mimosas / 6 / **9**; 4 / (Niger) USGN / 6 / **5**; Source: CAF | | | |
| Opponent | Agg. | 1st leg | 2nd leg | Knockout stage | Opponent | Agg. | 1st leg | 2nd leg |
| (Tanzania) Simba | 1–1 (4–3 p) | 0–1 (A) | 1–0 (H) | Quarter-finals | (Egypt) Al Masry | 2–2 (a) | 1–2 (A) | 1–0 (H) |
| (Libya) Al Ahli Tripoli | 2–1 | 2–0 (A) | 0–1 (H) | Semi-finals | (Democratic Republic of the Congo) TP Mazembe | 4–2 | 0–1 (A) | 4–1 (H) |

== Format ==
The final was played as a single match at a pre-selected venue, with the winner of semi-final 1 according to the knockout stage draw designated as the "home" team for administrative purposes. If scores were level after full time, extra time was played and if still level, the winner was decided by a penalty shoot-out (Regulations Article III. 28).

== Match ==
=== Details ===
20 May 2022
20:00 UTC+1

| Orlando Pirates (South Africa) | 1–1 (a.e.t.) | (Morocco) RS Berkane |
|---|---|---|
| Lorch 117' | Report | El Fahli 97' (pen.) |
Penalties
| Jele (penalty scored); Lorch (penalty missed); Mabaso (penalty scored); Monare (penalty scored); Ofori (penalty scored) | 4–5 | (penalty scored) El Moussaoui; (penalty scored) Zghoudi; (penalty scored) Mokadem; (penalty scored) Dayo; (penalty scored) El Bahraoui |

Godswill Akpabio International Stadium, Uyo
Referee: Janny Sikazwe (Zambia)

| GK | 1 | (Ghana) Richard Ofori |
| CB | 49 | (Nigeria) Olisa Ndah |
| CB | 4 | (South Africa) Happy Jele |
| RB | 26 | (South Africa) Bandile Shandu | (yellow card) 77' | (substituted off) 90' |
| LB | 23 | (South Africa) Innocent Maela |
| CM | 6 | (South Africa) Ben Motshwari | | (substituted off) 90' |
| CM | 20 | (South Africa) Goodman Mosele | | (substituted off) 102' |
| AM | 18 | (South Africa) Kabelo Dlamini | | (substituted off) 105' |
| LM | 11 | (Namibia) Deon Hotto |
| RM | 3 | (South Africa) Thembinkosi Lorch |
| CF | 46 | (Ghana) Kwame Peprah | | (substituted off) 60' |
Substitutes:
| GK | 37 | (Zimbabwe) Terrence Dzvukamanja | | (substituted on) 102' |
| GK | 40 | (South Africa) Siyabonga Mpontshane |
| DF | 5 | (South Africa) Ntsikelelo Nyauza |
| DF | 14 | (South Africa) Thulani Hlatshwayo |
| MF | 8 | (South Africa) Siphesihle Ndlovu | | (substituted on) 90', (substituted off) 102' |
| MF | 15 | (South Africa) Fortune Makaringe | | (substituted on) 102' |
| MF | 16 | (South Africa) Thabang Monare | | (substituted on) 90' |
| MF | 32 | (South Africa) Linda Mntambo | | (substituted on) 105' |
| FW | 9 | (South Africa) Tshegofatso Mabaso | | (substituted on) 60' |
Manager:
(South Africa) Mandla Ncikazi

| GK | 12 | (Morocco) Hamza Akbi |
| CB | 4 | (Burkina Faso) Issoufou Dayo |
| CB | 14 | (Morocco) Ismael Mokadem |
| RB | 33 | (Morocco) Abdelkrim Baadi |
| LB | 19 | (Morocco) Hamza El Moussaoui |
| CM | 21 | (Morocco) Bakr El Helali | (yellow card) 116' | (substituted off) 117' |
| CM | 8 | (Morocco) Larbi Naji |
| CM | 20 | (Morocco) Mehdi Oubila | | (substituted off) 80' |
| AM | 10 | (Democratic Republic of the Congo) Chadrack Lukombe | | (substituted off) 108' |
| CF | 7 | (Morocco) Youssef El Fahli | | (substituted off) 108' |
| CF | 38 | (Morocco) Charki El-Bahri | | (substituted off) 80' |
Substitutes:
| GK | 22 | (Morocco) Amine El Ouaad |
| DF | 15 | (Morocco) Hamza Regragui | | (substituted on) 80' |
| DF | 23 | (Morocco) Omar Namsaoui |
| DF | 25 | (Morocco) Mohamed Aziz |
| MF | 6 | (Senegal) Mamadou Camara | | (substituted on) 117' |
| MF | 18 | (Morocco) Sofian El Moudane |
| MF | 29 | (Democratic Republic of the Congo) Tuisila Kisinda | | (substituted on) 108' |
| FW | 3 | (Morocco) Brahim El Bahraoui | | (substituted on) 80' |
| FW | 11 | (Morocco) Youssef Zghoudi | | (substituted on) 108' |
Manager:
(Democratic Republic of the Congo) Florent Ibengé

=== Statistics ===
First half
| Statistic | Orlando Pirates | RS Berkane |
|---|---|---|
| Goals scored | 0 | 0 |
| Total shots | 6 | 4 |
| Shots on target | 3 | 1 |
| Saves | 1 | 3 |
| Ball possession | 49% | 51% |
| Corner kicks | 2 | 0 |
| Yellow cards | 0 | 0 |
| Red cards | 0 | 0 |

Second half
| Statistic | Orlando Pirates | RS Berkane |
|---|---|---|
| Goals scored | 0 | 0 |
| Total shots | 3 | 1 |
| Shots on target | 2 | 0 |
| Saves | 0 | 2 |
| Ball possession | 52% | 48% |
| Corner kicks | 3 | 0 |
| Yellow cards | 1 | 0 |
| Red cards | 0 | 0 |

First half extra-time
| Statistic | Orlando Pirates | RS Berkane |
|---|---|---|
| Goals scored | 0 | 1 |
| Total shots | 1 | 2 |
| Shots on target | 0 | 1 |
| Saves | 0 | 0 |
| Ball possession | 57% | 43% |
| Corner kicks | 1 | 1 |
| Yellow cards | 0 | 0 |
| Red cards | 0 | 0 |

Second half extra-time
| Statistic | Orlando Pirates | RS Berkane |
|---|---|---|
| Goals scored | 1 | 0 |
| Total shots | 2 | 1 |
| Shots on target | 1 | 0 |
| Saves | 0 | 0 |
| Ball possession | 52% | 48% |
| Corner kicks | 1 | 1 |
| Yellow cards | 0 | 1 |
| Red cards | 0 | 0 |

Overall
| Statistic | Orlando Pirates | RS Berkane |
|---|---|---|
| Goals scored | 1 | 1 |
| Total shots | 12 | 8 |
| Shots on target | 6 | 2 |
| Saves | 1 | 5 |
| Ball possession | 51% | 49% |
| Corner kicks | 7 | 2 |
| Yellow cards | 1 | 1 |
| Red cards | 0 | 0 |

== See also ==
- 2022 CAF Champions League Final
- 2022 CAF Super Cup
