= 2021–22 CAF Confederation Cup knockout stage =

- Dates: 17 April – 20 May 2022

Tournament statistics
- Matches played: 13
- Goals scored: 20 (1.54 per match)

The 2021–22 CAF Confederation Cup knockout stage started on 17 April with the quarter-finals and ended on 20 May 2022 with the final to decide the champions of the 2021–22 CAF Confederation Cup. A total of eight teams competed in the knockout stage.

Times are listed in local times.

== Round and draw dates ==
The schedule was as follows.

Round	Draw date	First leg	Second leg
Quarter-finals	5 April 2022	17 April 2022	24 April 2022
Semi-finals	5 April 2022	8 May 2022	15 May 2022
Final	5 April 2022	20 May 2022	

== Format ==
Each tie in the knockout stage, apart from the final, was played over two legs, with each team playing one leg at home. The team that scored more goals on aggregate over the two legs advanced to the next round. If the aggregate score was level, the away goals rule was applied, i.e. the team that scored more goals away from home over the two legs advanced. If away goals were also equal, then extra time was not played and the winners were decided by a penalty shoot-out. In the final, which was played as a single match, if the score was level at the end of normal time, extra time was played and if the score was still level, the winners were decided by a penalty shoot-out. The mechanism of the draws for each round was as follows:

- In the draw for the quarter-finals, the four group winners were seeded, and the four group runners-up were unseeded. The seeded teams were drawn against the unseeded teams, with the seeded teams hosting the second leg. Teams from the same group could not be drawn against each other, while teams from the same association can be drawn against each other.
- In the draws for semi-finals, there were no seedings, and teams from the same group or the same association could be drawn against each other. As the draws for the quarter-finals and semi-finals were held together before the quarter-finals were played, the identity of the quarter-final winners was not known at the time of the semi-final draw.

== Qualified teams ==
The knockout stage involved the 8 teams which qualify as winners and runners-up of each of the eight groups in the group stage.

Group	Winners	Runners-up
A	(Libya) Al Ahli Tripoli	(Egypt) Pyramids
B	(South Africa) Orlando Pirates	(Libya) Al Ittihad
C	(Democratic Republic of the Congo) TP Mazembe	(Egypt) Al Masry
D	(Morocco) RS Berkane	(Tanzania) Simba

== Bracket ==
The bracket of the knockout stage was determined as follows:

Round	Matchups
Quarter-finals	(Group winners hosted second leg, matchups decided by draw, teams from same group cannot play each other): QF1; QF2; QF3; QF4
Semi-finals	(Matchups and order of legs decided by draw, between winners QF1, QF2, QF3, QF4): SF1; SF2
Final	Winners SF1 and SF2 faced each other to decide the champions

The bracket was decided after the draw for the knockout stage (quarter-finals and semi-finals), which was held on 5 April 2022, 13:00 GMT (15:00 local time, UTC+2), at the CAF headquarters in Cairo, Egypt.

Quarter-finals
(Libya) Al Ittihad	0	0	0
(Libya) Al Ahli Tripoli	0	1	1
(Tanzania) Simba	1	0	1 (3)
(South Africa) Orlando Pirates (p)	0	1	1 (4)
(Egypt) Pyramids	0	0	0
(Democratic Republic of the Congo) TP Mazembe	0	2	2
(Egypt) Al Masry	2	0	2
(Morocco) RS Berkane (a)	1	1	2

Semi-finals
(Libya) Al Ahli Tripoli	0	1	1
(South Africa) Orlando Pirates	2	0	2
(Democratic Republic of the Congo) TP Mazembe	1	1	2
(Morocco) RS Berkane	0	4	4

Final
20 May – Uyo
(South Africa) Orlando Pirates	1 (4)
(Morocco) RS Berkane (p)	1 (5)

== Quarter-finals ==
The draw for the quarter-finals was held on 5 April 2022.

=== Summary ===
The first legs were played on 17 April, and the second were played on 24 April 2022.

Team 1	Agg.	Team 2	1st leg	2nd leg
Simba (Tanzania)	1–1 (3–4 p)	(South Africa) Orlando Pirates	1–0	0–1
Al Ittihad (Libya)	0–1	(Libya) Al Ahli Tripoli	0–0	0–1
Pyramids (Egypt)	0–2	(Democratic Republic of the Congo) TP Mazembe	0–0	0–2
Al Masry (Egypt)	2–2 (a)	(Morocco) RS Berkane	2–1	0–1

=== Matches ===
17 April 2022
19:00 UTC+3

Simba (Tanzania)	1–0	(South Africa) Orlando Pirates
Kapombe 68' (pen.)	Report

National Stadium, Dar es Salaam
Attendance: 60.000
Referee: Haythem Guirat (Tunisia)
24 April 2022
18:00 UTC+2

Orlando Pirates (South Africa)	1–0	(Tanzania) Simba
Peprah 60'	Report
Penalties
Kavendji (penalty scored); Mhango (penalty scored); Mabasa (penalty scored); Dlamini (penalty missed); Ofori (penalty scored)	4–3	(penalty missed) Mkude; (penalty scored) Kapombe; (penalty missed) Baka; (penalty scored) Kagere; (penalty scored) Mohamed

Orlando Stadium, Johannesburg
Attendance: 20.000
Referee: Bernard Camille (Seychelles)

1–1 on aggregate. Orlando Pirates won 4–3 on penalties.

17 April 2022
22:00 UTC+2

Al Ittihad (Libya)	0–0	(Libya) Al Ahli Tripoli
	Report

Benina Martyrs Stadium, Benghazi
Attendance: 0 (close doors)
Referee: Mohamed Marouf Eid Mansour (Egypt)
24 April 2022
22:00 UTC+2

Al Ahli Tripoli (Libya)	1–0	(Libya) Al Ittihad
Ayed 19'	Report

Benina Martyrs Stadium, Benghazi
Attendance: 0 (close doors)
Referee: Mustapha Ghorbal (Algeria)

Al Ahli Tripoli won 1–0 on aggregate.

17 April 2022
22:00 UTC+2

Pyramids (Egypt)	0–0	(Democratic Republic of the Congo) TP Mazembe
	Report

30 June Stadium, Cairo
Attendance: 5.000
Referee: Dahane Beida (Mauritania)
24 April 2022
15:00 UTC+2

TP Mazembe (Democratic Republic of the Congo)	2–0	(Egypt) Pyramids
Koffi 33'; Kitambala 44'	Report

Stade TP Mazembe, Lubumbashi
Attendance: 10.000
Referee: Joshua Bondo (Botswana)

TP Mazembe won 2–0 on aggregate.

17 April 2022
22:00 UTC+2

Al Masry (Egypt)	2–1	(Morocco) RS Berkane
Marey 10'; Ayouni 83'	Report	Regragui 17'

Borg El Arab Stadium, Alexandria
Attendance: 10.000
Referee: Boubou Traore (Mali)
24 April 2022
22:00 UTC+0

RS Berkane (Morocco)	1–0	(Egypt) Al Masry
El Fahli 7' (pen.)	Report

Stade Municipal de Berkane, Berkane
Attendance: 10.000
Referee: Sadok Selmi (Tunisia)

2–2 on aggregate. RS Berkane won on away goals.

== Semi-finals ==
The draw for the semi-finals was held on 5 April 2022 (after the quarter-finals draw).

=== Summary ===
The first legs were played on 8 May, and the second legs were played on 15 May 2022.

Team 1	Agg.	Team 2	1st leg	2nd leg
Al Ahli Tripoli (Libya)	1–2	(South Africa) Orlando Pirates	0–2	1–0
TP Mazembe (Democratic Republic of the Congo)	2–4	(Morocco) RS Berkane	1–0	1–4

=== Matches ===
8 May 2022
18:00 UTC+2

Al Ahli Tripoli (Libya)	0–2	(South Africa) Orlando Pirates
	Report	Maela 8'; Mosele 29'

Benina Martyrs Stadium, Benghazi
Attendance: 0 (close doors)
Referee: Redouane Jiyed (Morocco)
15 May 2022
18:00 UTC+2

Orlando Pirates (South Africa)	0–1	(Libya) Al Ahli Tripoli
	Report	Arqoub 89'

Orlando Stadium, Johannesburg
Attendance: 20.000
Referee: Bakary Gassama (Gambia)

Orlando Pirates won 2–1 on aggregate.

8 May 2022
15:00 UTC+2

TP Mazembe (Democratic Republic of the Congo)	1–0	(Morocco) RS Berkane
Bakata 90+5'	Report

Stade TP Mazembe, Lubumbashi
Attendance: 10.000
Referee: Hélder Martins de Carvalho (Angola)
15 May 2022
19:00 UTC+0

RS Berkane (Morocco)	4–1	(Democratic Republic of the Congo) TP Mazembe
El Helali 10'; Naji 79'; El Fahli 88' (pen.), 90+6'	Report	Kinzumbi 11'

Stade Municipal de Berkane, Berkane
Attendance: 10.000
Referee: Maguette Ndiaye (Senegal)

RS Berkane won 4–2 on aggregate.

== Final ==
The final was played on 20 May 2022 at Godswill Akpabio International Stadium, Uyo.

20 May 2022
20:00 UTC+1

Orlando Pirates (South Africa)	1–1 (a.e.t.)	(Morocco) RS Berkane
Lorch 117'	Report	El Fahli 97' (pen.)
Penalties
Jele (penalty scored); Lorch (penalty missed); Mabaso (penalty scored); Monare (penalty scored); Ofori (penalty scored)	4–5	(penalty scored) El Moussaoui; (penalty scored) Zghoudi; (penalty scored) Mokadem; (penalty scored) Dayo; (penalty scored) El Bahraoui

Godswill Akpabio International Stadium, Uyo
Referee: Janny Sikazwe (Zambia)
