= 2021–22 JS Saoura season =

JS Saoura
2021–22 season
- Owner: Entreprise Nationale de Forage
- President: Mohamed Zerouati
- Head coach: Kais Yakoubi (from 14 September 2021) (until 9 April 2022)
- Stadium: Stade 20 Août 1955
- Ligue 1: 3rd
- Confederation Cup: Group stage
- Top goalscorer: League: Belaid Hamidi (12 goals); All: Aimen Lahmeri (14 goals)

In the 2021–22 season, JS Saoura is competing in the Ligue 1 for the 10th season, as well as the Algerian Cup. It is their 10th consecutive season in the top flight of Algerian football. They competing in Ligue 1, the Algerian Cup and the Confederation Cup.

== Squad list ==
Players and squad numbers last updated on 20 October 2021.
Note: Flags indicate national team as has been defined under FIFA eligibility rules. Players may hold more than one non-FIFA nationality.

No.	Nat.	Position	Name	Date of Birth (Age)	Signed from
Goalkeepers
1	(Algeria)	GK	Zakaria Saidi	5 August 1996 (aged 25)	(Algeria) Olympique de Médéa
13	(Algeria)	GK	Aymen Mouyet	17 May 1999 (aged 22)	(Algeria) ES Sétif
16	(Algeria)	GK	Omar Hadji	9 November 1991 (aged 30)	(Algeria) Paradou AC
Defenders
2	(Algeria)	CB	Riyane Akacem	13 February 1999 (aged 22)	(Algeria) Youth system
4	(Algeria)	CB	Abdelkrim Allaoui	15 September 1999 (aged 22)	(Algeria) Youth system
14	(Algeria)	RB	Oussama Meddahi	14 February 1991 (aged 30)	(Algeria) DRB Tadjenanet
17	(Algeria)	CB	Mohamed Amrane	27 January 1994 (aged 27)	(Algeria) CA Bordj Bou Arreridj
22	(Algeria)	CB	Imadeddine Boubekeur	10 July 1995 (aged 26)	(Algeria) Olympique de Médéa
43	(Algeria)	LB	Marwane Khelif	8 February 2000 (aged 21)	(Algeria) Youth system
Midfielders
5	(Algeria)	MF	Farouk Slimani	1 July 1999 (aged 22)	(Algeria) Youth system
6	(Algeria)	MF	Abderrazak Khelifi	1 April 1999 (aged 22)	(Algeria) Youth system
7	(Algeria)	MF	Abdeldjalil Taki Eddine Saâd	12 March 1992 (aged 29)	(Algeria) MC Saida
8	(Algeria)	MF	Belaid Hamidi	7 May 1996 (aged 25)	(Algeria) MC Saida
18	(Algeria)	MF	Mohamed Daoud	27 December 1991 (aged 30)	(Algeria) Olympique de Médéa
23	(Algeria)	MF	Fayçal Choubane	2 August 1996 (aged 25)	(Algeria)
25	(Algeria)	MF	Adel Bouchiba	10 November 1988 (aged 33)	(Algeria) Olympique de Médéa
26	(Algeria)	MF	Mohamed El Amine Hammia	21 December 1991 (aged 30)	(Algeria) USM Blida
27	(Algeria)	MF	Benamar Mellal	9 August 1993 (aged 28)	(Algeria) MC Oran
Forwards
10	(Algeria)	FW	Oussama Bellatreche	3 July 1995 (aged 26)	(Algeria) WA Tlemcen
11	(Algeria)	FW	Aimen Lahmeri	28 May 1996 (aged 25)	(Algeria) GC Mascara
12	(Tanzania)	FW	Adam Salamba	25 November 1999 (aged 22)	(Tanzania) Namungo FC
15	(Algeria)	FW	Ismaïl Saadi	4 April 1997 (aged 24)	(Algeria) ES Sétif
20	(Algeria)	ST	Billel Elmammeri	18 January 1991 (aged 30)	(Algeria) AS Ain M'lila
21	(Algeria)	FW	Mohamed Amine Ouis	6 December 1992 (aged 29)	(Algeria) ASO Chlef
24	(Algeria)	FW	Mohamed Lamine Boutouala	27 November 1999 (aged 22)	(Algeria) Youth system

== Competitions ==
=== Overview ===
Competition	Record								Started round	Final position / round	First match	Last match
Competition	G	W	D	L	GF	GA	GD	Win %	Started round	Final position / round	First match	Last match
Ligue 1	34	17	9	8	59	23	+36	50.00	—N/a	3rd	2 November 2021	11 June 2022
Confederation Cup	10	5	2	3	13	9	+4	50.00	Second round	Group stage	16 October 2021	3 April 2022
Total	44	22	11	11	72	32	+40	50.00				

Updated to match played 11 June 2022
Source: Competitions

== League table ==
Pos	Team	Pld	W	D	L	GF	GA	GD	Pts	Qualification or relegation
1	CR Belouizdad (C)	34	21	7	6	54	22	+32	70	Qualification for CAF Champions League
2	JS Kabylie	34	16	13	5	40	20	+20	61	Qualification for CAF Champions League
3	JS Saoura	34	17	9	8	59	23	+36	60	Qualification for CAF Confederation Cup
4	USM Alger	34	15	12	7	45	22	+23	57	Qualification for CAF Confederation Cup
5	CS Constantine	34	15	10	9	46	29	+17	55	

Updated to match(es) played on 17 June 2022. Source: the-sports.org
Rules for classification: 1) points; 2) head-to-head points; 3) head-to-head goal difference; 4) goal difference; 5) total goals; 6) fairplay ranking; 7) playoff.
(C) Champions

=== Results summary ===
Overall								Home						Away					
Pld	W	D	L	GF	GA	GD	Pts	W	D	L	GF	GA	GD	W	D	L	GF	GA	GD
34	17	9	8	59	24	+35	60	12	4	1	42	6	+36	5	5	7	17	18	−1

Last updated: 11 June 2022.
Source: Competitive matches

=== Results by round ===
Round	1	2	3	4	5	6	7	8	9	10	11	12	13	14	15	16	17	18	19	20	21	22	23	24	25	26	27	28	29	30	31	32	33	34
Ground																																		
Result	W	L	W	D	W	D	W	L	W	W	D	L	W	W	D	W	D	W	W	D	W	L	D	L	L	D	W	L	W	L	W	D	W	W
Position	1	8	4	5	4	5	2	6	4	4	4	6	3	3	3	2	2	2	2	2	2	2	2	2	3	5	4	5	3	4	3	3	3	3

Updated to match(es) played on 11 June 2022. Source: Competitive matches
A = Away; H = Home; W = Win; D = Draw; L = Loss

=== Matches ===
The league fixtures were announced on 7 October 2021.

2 November 2021 Round 1	JS Saoura	6–0	RC Relizane	Béchar
15:00	Hamidi 3', 67', 74' (pen.); Ouis 42'; Boubekeur 61'; Hammia 90'	Report		Stadium: Stade 20 Août 1955; Referee: Lyés Bekouassa

29 October 2021 Round 2	US Biskra	2–1	JS Saoura	Biskra
15:00	Djahnit 10', 61'	Report	Lahmeri 80' (pen.)	Stadium: Stade du 18 Février; Referee: Youcef Gamouh

7 November 2021 Round 3	JS Saoura	1–0	USM Alger	Béchar
17:00	Bouchiba (yellow card) 69'; Amrane (yellow card) 70'; Bellatreche 88' (yellow card) 88'; Saidi (yellow card) 90'	Report	Hamra (yellow card) 33'	Stadium: Stade 20 Août 1955; Referee: Said Aouina

19 November 2021 Round 4	HB Chelghoum Laïd	0–0	JS Saoura	Chelghoum Laïd
15:00		Report		Stadium: 11 December 1961 Stadium; Referee: Nabil Boukhalfa

10 December 2021 Round 7	JS Saoura	2–0	MC Oran	Béchar
17:00	Lahmeri 55'; Bellatreche 87'	Report		Stadium: Stade 20 Août 1955; Referee: Lotfi Bekouassa

14 December 2021 Round 5	JS Saoura	1–0	JS Kabylie	Béchar
17:00	Bouchiba 1'	Report		Stadium: Stade 20 Août 1955; Referee: Bilal Bendjahene

18 December 2021 Round 8	CR Belouizdad	1–0	JS Saoura	Belouizdad
13:00	Selmi 55'	Report		Stadium: Stade 20 Août 1955; Attendance: 0 (close doors); Referee: Mehdi Abid Charef

24 December 2021 Round 9	JS Saoura	1–0	NC Magra	Béchar
17:00	Hamidi 13'	Report		Stadium: Stade 20 Août 1955; Referee: Amine Hansal

28 December 2021 Round 10	WA Tlemcen	2–3	JS Saoura	Tlemcen
14:00	Bounoua 62'; Gali Zerargua 89' (pen.)	Report	Lahmeri 33' (pen.); Saâd 45', 84'	Stadium: Colonel Lotfi Stadium; Referee: Bilel Soltani

2 January 2022 Round 11	JS Saoura	0–0	MC Alger	Béchar
17:00		Report		Stadium: Stade 20 Août 1955; Referee: Mohamed Amine Bouteraa

7 January 2022 Round 12	CS Constantine	1–0	JS Saoura	Constantine
15:00	Belahouel 68'	Report		Stadium: Stade Ramdane Benabdelmalek; Referee: Lyés Bekouassa

11 January 2022 Round 6	ASO Chlef	2–2	JS Saoura	Chlef
18:00	Kerssani 32'; Fourloul 90+2' (pen.)	Report	Hamidi 41' (pen.); Bellatreche 64'	Stadium: Mohamed Boumezrag Stadium

16 January 2022 Round 13	JS Saoura	4–1	Paradou AC	Béchar
16:00	Bellatreche 45+2'; Saâdi 48'; Lahmeri 83' (pen.); Ben Yezli 90+2'	Report	Bouzok 17'	Stadium: Stade 20 Août 1955; Referee: Mohamed Saïdi

21 January 2022 Round 14	Olympique de Médéa	0–3	JS Saoura	Médéa
15:00	Hamidi 30', 49'; Bellatreche 72'	Report		Stadium: Stade Imam Lyes; Referee: Abdellah Benchehida

25 January 2022 Round 15	JS Saoura	1–1	ES Sétif	Béchar
17:00	Hamidi 45+3'	Report	Djahnit 44'	Stadium: Stade 20 Août 1955; Referee: Bilal Bendjahene

29 January 2022 Round 16	NA Hussein Dey	1–2	JS Saoura	Belouizdad
14:30	Ardji 5'	Report	Mellal 77', 90+2'	Stadium: Stade 20 Août 1955; Referee: Youcef Gamouh

5 February 2022 Round 17	JS Saoura	0–0	RC Arbaâ	Béchar
17:00		Report		Stadium: Stade 20 Août 1955; Referee: Ali Nader

5 March 2022 Round 20	USM Alger	0–0	JS Saoura	Bologhine
18:00		Report		Stadium: Omar Hamadi Stadium; Referee: Mustapha Ghorbal

9 March 2022 Round 18	RC Relizane	1–2	JS Saoura	Relizane
14:30	Balegh 18' (pen.)	Report	Saâdi 76'; Lahmeri 87' (pen.)	Stadium: Stade Tahar Zoughari; Referee: Amine Hansal

24 March 2022 Round 19	JS Saoura	2–0	US Biskra	Béchar
17:00	Saâd 60', 86'	Report		Stadium: Stade 20 Août 1955; Referee: Malek Ait Ameur

28 March 2022 Round 23	JS Saoura	2–2	ASO Chlef	Béchar
16:00	Zahzouh 10' (o.g.); Adrar 60'	Report	Souibaâh 81'; Litt 89'	Stadium: Stade 20 Août 1955; Referee: Amine Sekhraoui

8 April 2022 Round 21	JS Saoura	5–0	HB Chelghoum Laïd	Béchar
23:00	Lahmeri 18' (pen.); Bellatreche 49', 61'; Amrane 69'; Boubekeur 82'	Report		Stadium: Stade 20 Août 1955; Referee: Mohamed Amine Benzohra

17 May 2022 Round 22	JS Kabylie	2–1	JS Saoura	Tizi Ouzou
17:30	Boukhanchouche 9', 22'	Report	Lahmeri 40'	Stadium: Stade 1er Novembre 1954; Referee: Mehdi Abid Charef

1 June 2022 Round 24	MC Oran	2–1	JS Saoura	Oran
17:45	Chaouti 11'; Siam 19'	Report	Saâd 29'	Stadium: Ahmed Zabana Stadium; Referee: Amine Hansal

12 April 2022 Round 25	JS Saoura	0–1	CR Belouizdad	Béchar
22:00		Report	Bouras 90'	Stadium: Stade 20 Août 1955; Referee: Nabil Boukhalfa

17 April 2022 Round 26	NC Magra	0–0	JS Saoura	Magra
15:45		Report		Stadium: Boucheligue Brothers Stadium; Referee: Youcef Gamouh

23 April 2022 Round 27	JS Saoura	6–0	WA Tlemcen	Béchar
22:30	Bellatreche 4'; Saâdi 23'; Bouziani 39'; Lahmeri 67'; Hamidi 75', 85'	Report		Stadium: Stade 20 Août 1955; Referee: Marouane Mohamed Belkebir

29 April 2022 Round 28	MC Alger	2–0	JS Saoura	Algiers
22:30	Rebiai 9'; Abdelhafid 90'	Report		Stadium: Stade du 5 Juillet; Referee: Abdelali Ibrir

7 May 2022 Round 29	JS Saoura	2–0	CS Constantine	Béchar
17:30	Lahmeri 75' (pen.); Hammia 90+5'	Report		Stadium: Stade 20 Août 1955; Referee: Ali Nader

13 May 2022 Round 30	Paradou AC	1–0	JS Saoura	Dar El Beïda
17:00	Akacem 52' (o.g.)	Report		Stadium: Omar Benrabah Stadium; Attendance: 0 (close doors); Referee: Akram Mechairia

21 May 2022 Round 31	JS Saoura	4–1	Olympique de Médéa	Béchar
19:00	Mellal 33'; Saâdi 52'; Omar Adrar 81', 86'	Report	Gagaâ 78' (pen.)	Stadium: Stade 20 Août 1955; Referee: Houssam Benyahia

29 May 2022 Round 32	ES Sétif	0–0	JS Saoura	Sétif
20:00		Report		Stadium: Stade 8 Mai 1945; Referee: Lyés Bekouassa

5 June 2022 Round 33	JS Saoura	5–0	NA Hussein Dey	Béchar
20:00	Hamidi 9' (pen.); Mellal 20'; Saâd 28', 80'; Hammia 58'	Report		Stadium: Stade 20 Août 1955; Referee: Oussama Boumesdjed

11 June 2022 Round 34	RC Arbaâ	1–2	JS Saoura	Larbaâ
17:45	Toumi Sief 63'	Report	Lahmeri 51'; Hamidi 68' (pen.)	Stadium: Ismaïl Makhlouf Stadium; Referee: Abdelmoumen Touabti

== Confederation Cup ==
=== Second round ===
16 October 2021 First leg	ASAC Concorde (Mauritania)	1–2	(Algeria) JS Saoura	Nouakchott
16:00 UTC+0	Thiam 8' (pen.)	Report	Lahmeri 85', 88'	Stadium: Stade Olympique de Nouakchott; Referee: Swahib Bangura (Sierra Leone)

23 October 2021 Second leg	JS Saoura (Algeria)	1–1 (3–2 agg.)	(Mauritania) ASAC Concorde	Algiers
18:00 UTC+1	Lahmeri 48'	Report	Thiam 90'	Stadium: Omar Hamadi Stadium; Referee: Shuhoub Abdulbasit (Libya)

=== Playoffs round ===
28 November 2021 First leg	Hearts of Oak (Ghana)	2–0	(Algeria) JS Saoura	Accra
15:00 UTC+0	Ibrahim 16'; Boateng 72'	Report		Stadium: Accra Sports Stadium; Referee: Mohamed Adel (Egypt)

5 December 2021 Second leg	JS Saoura (Algeria)	4–0	(Ghana) Hearts of Oak	Béchar
17:45 UTC+1	Saâd 21'; Bellatreche 37', 48'; Lahmeri 88'	Report		Stadium: 20 August Stadium; Referee: Adalbert Diouf (Senegal)

=== Group stage ===
==== Group B ====
Pos	Team	Pld	W	D	L	GF	GA	GD	Pts	Qualification	ORL	ITT	JSS	ROL
1	(South Africa) Orlando Pirates	6	4	1	1	15	5	+10	13	Advance to knockout stage	—	0–0	2–0	3–0
2	(Libya) Al Ittihad	6	3	2	1	9	7	+2	11	Advance to knockout stage	3–2	—	1–1	3–2
3	(Algeria) JS Saoura	6	3	1	2	6	5	+1	10		0–2	1–0	—	2–0
4	(Eswatini) Royal Leopards	6	0	0	6	5	18	−13	0		2–6	1–2	0–2	—

Source: CAF

13 February 2022 Matchday 1	Orlando Pirates (South Africa)	2–0	(Algeria) JS Saoura	Johannesburg
18:00 UTC+2	Jele 3'; Shandu 66'	Report		Stadium: Orlando Stadium; Referee: Mahmood Ismail (Sudan)

20 February 2022 Matchday 2	JS Saoura (Algeria)	2–0	(Eswatini) Royal Leopards	Algiers (Note: JS Saoura play their group stage home matches at Stade du 5 Juillet, Algiers, instead of their regular home stadium Stade 20 Août 1955, Béchar, which did not meet CAF requirements.)
20:00 UTC+1	Hamidi 9' (pen.); Hammia 90+3' (pen.)	Report		Stadium: Stade du 5 Juillet; Referee: Djindo Louis Houngnandandé (Benin)

27 February 2022 Matchday 3	Al Ittihad (Libya)	1–1	(Algeria) JS Saoura	Benghazi
18:00 UTC+2	Zubya 22'	Report	Ouis 30'	Stadium: Benina Martyrs Stadium; Referee: Daouda Gueye (Senegal)

13 March 2022 Matchday 4	JS Saoura (Algeria)	1–0	(Libya) Al Ittihad	Algiers
20:00 UTC+1	Bellatreche 1'	Report		Stadium: Stade du 5 Juillet; Referee: Mahmoud El Banna (Egypt)

20 March 2022 Matchday 5	JS Saoura (Algeria)	0–2	(South Africa) Orlando Pirates	Algiers
20:00 UTC+1		Report	Nyauza 48'; K. Dlamini 51'	Stadium: Stade du 5 Juillet; Referee: Mahamadou Kéïta (Mali)

3 April 2022 Matchday 6	Royal Leopards (Eswatini)	0–2	(Algeria) JS Saoura	Mbombela (South Africa) (Note: Royal Leopards F.C. play their group stage home matches at Mbombela Stadium, Mbombela (South Africa), instead of their regular home stadium Simunye Park, Simunye, which did not meet CAF requirements.)
18:00 UTC+2		Report	Saâdi 51'; Bellatreche 54'	Stadium: Mbombela Stadium; Referee: Patrice Milazar (Mauritius)

== Squad information ==
=== Playing statistics ===
No.	Pos	Nat	Player	Total		Ligue 1		Confederation Cup	
No.	Pos	Nat	Player	Apps	Goals	Apps	Goals	Apps	Goals
1	GK	(Algeria) ALG	Zakaria Saidi	36	0	27	0	9	0
13	GK	(Algeria) ALG	Aymen Mouyet	5	0	3	0	2	0
16	GK	(Algeria) ALG	Omar Hadji	4	0	4	0	0	0
2	DF	(Algeria) ALG	Riyane Akacem	27	0	21	0	6	0
4	DF	(Algeria) ALG	Abdelkrim Allaoui	0	0	0	0	0	0
14	DF	(Algeria) ALG	Oussama Meddahi	4	0	0	0	4	0
17	DF	(Algeria) ALG	Mohamed Amrane	38	1	29	1	9	0
22	DF	(Algeria) ALG	Imadeddine Boubekeur	33	2	24	2	9	0
43	DF	(Algeria) ALG	Marwane Khelif	32	0	23	0	9	0
47	DF	(Algeria) ALG	Oussama Bouziani	7	1	7	1	0	0
49	DF	(Algeria) ALG	Fayçal Mebarki	8	0	6	0	2	0
5	MF	(Algeria) ALG	Farouk Slimani	1	0	1	0	0	0
6	MF	(Algeria) ALG	Abderrazak Khelifi	31	0	22	0	9	0
7	MF	(Algeria) ALG	Abdeldjalil Taki Eddine Saâd	41	8	31	7	10	1
8	MF	(Algeria) ALG	Belaid Hamidi	43	13	34	12	9	1
18	MF	(Algeria) ALG	Mohamed Daoud	11	0	7	0	4	0
23	MF	(Algeria) ALG	Fayçal Choubane	3	0	3	0	0	0
25	MF	(Algeria) ALG	Adel Bouchiba	40	1	31	1	9	0
26	MF	(Algeria) ALG	Mohamed El Amine Hammia	39	4	30	3	9	1
27	MF	(Algeria) ALG	Benamar Mellal	35	4	29	4	6	0
10	FW	(Algeria) ALG	Oussama Bellatreche	35	11	25	8	10	3
11	FW	(Algeria) ALG	Aimen Lahmeri	42	14	33	10	9	4
12	FW	(Tanzania) TAN	Adam Salamba	1	0	1	0	0	0
15	FW	(Algeria) ALG	Ismaïl Saâdi	40	5	31	4	9	1
20	FW	(Algeria) ALG	Billel Elmammeri	0	0	0	0	0	0
21	FW	(Algeria) ALG	Mohamed Amine Ouis	30	2	25	1	5	1
24	FW	(Algeria) ALG	Mohamed Lamine Boutouala	21	0	17	0	4	0
36	FW	(Algeria) ALG	Islam Eddine Kaidi	15	0	12	0	3	0
19	FW	(Algeria) ALG	Omar Adrar	15	3	15	3	0	0
Players transferred out during the season

Last updated: 23 October 2021
Source: fr.soccerway.com

=== Goalscorers ===
Includes all competitive matches. The list is sorted alphabetically by surname when total goals are equal.

No.	Nat.	Player	Pos.	L 1	CC 3	TOTAL
11	(Algeria)	Aimen Lahmeri	FW	10	4	14
8	(Algeria)	Belaid Hamidi	MF	12	1	13
10	(Algeria)	Oussama Bellatreche	FW	8	3	11
7	(Algeria)	Abdeldjalil Saâd	MF	7	1	8
15	(Algeria)	Ismaïl Saâdi	FW	4	1	5
27	(Algeria)	Benamar Mellal	MF	4	0	4
26	(Algeria)	Mohamed El Amine Hammia	MF	3	1	4
19	(Algeria)	Omar Adrar	FW	3	0	3
22	(Algeria)	Imadeddine Boubekeur	DF	2	0	2
21	(Algeria)	Mohamed Amine Ouis	FW	1	1	2
17	(Algeria)	Mohamed Amrane	DF	1	0	1
	(Algeria)	Islam Ben Yezli	FW	1	0	1
25	(Algeria)	Adel Bouchiba	MF	1	0	1
	(Algeria)	Oussama Bouziani	DF	1	0	1
Own Goals				1	0	1
Totals				59	13	72

== Transfers ==
=== In ===
Date	Pos	Player	From club	Transfer fee	Source
15 August 2021	LW	(Algeria) Ismaïl Saâdi	ES Sétif	Free transfer	
16 August 2021	RW	(Algeria) Oussama Bellatreche	WA Tlemcen	Free transfer	
3 September 2021	RW	(Algeria) Benamar Mellal	MC Oran	Free transfer	
5 September 2021	FW	(Algeria) Mohamed Amine Ouis	ASO Chlef	Free transfer	
16 September 2021	GK	(Algeria) Omar Hadji	Paradou AC	Free transfer	

=== Out ===
Date	Pos	Player	To club	Transfer fee	Source
31 August 2021	ST	(Algeria) Billel Messaoudi	(Belgium) Kortrijk	Loan for one year	
20 September 2021	LB	(Algeria) Oussama Kaddour	Olympique de Médéa	Free transfer	
22 September 2021	FW	(Algeria) Hamza Zaidi	MC Alger	Free transfer	
22 September 2021	CB	(Algeria) Fateh Talah	JS Kabylie	Free transfer	
19 October 2021	FW	(Algeria) Sid Ali Yahia-Chérif	RC Kouba	Free transfer	
20 October 2021	GK	(Algeria) Zakaria Haouli	AS Aïn M'lila	Free transfer	
20 October 2021	FW	(Algeria) Mehdi Droueche	USM Khenchela	Free transfer	
