= 2021–22 CAF Confederation Cup group stage =

- Dates: 13 February – 3 April 2022

Tournament statistics
- Matches played: 48
- Goals scored: 116 (2.42 per match)

The 2021–22 CAF Confederation Cup group stage were played from 13 February to 3 April 2022. A total of 16 teams competed in the group stage to decide the eight places in the knockout stage of the 2021–22 CAF Confederation Cup.

Times are in local times.

== Draw ==
The draw for the group stage was held on 28 December 2021, 11:00 GMT (13:00 local time, UTC+2), at the CAF headquarters in Cairo, Egypt. The 16 winners of the play-off round of qualifying were drawn into four groups of four.

The teams were seeded by their performances in the CAF competitions for the previous five seasons (CAF 5-year ranking points shown next to every team). Each group contained one team from each of Pot 1, Pot 2, Pot 3, and Pot 4, and each team was allocated to the positions in their group according to their pot.

Pot 1
Team	Pts
(Democratic Republic of the Congo) TP Mazembe	45
(Morocco) RS Berkane	41
(Egypt) Pyramids	31
(Eswatini) Royal Leopards (Note: Since the identity of the winners of the play-off round tie between JS Kabylie and Royal Leopards was not known at the time of the draw, the ranking of the higher-ranked team (JS Kabylie (28 pts)) was used for seeding of the draw.)	28

Pot 2
Team	Pts
(Tanzania) Simba	24
(Tunisia) CS Sfaxien	21
(Cameroon) Coton Sport	16
(South Africa) Orlando Pirates	16

Pot 3
Team	Pts
(Egypt) Al Masry	14
(Zambia) Zanaco	10
(Algeria) JS Saoura	6
(Ivory Coast) ASEC Mimosas	5

Pot 4
Team	Pts
(Libya) Al Ahli Tripoli	3
(Republic of the Congo) AS Otohô	1.5
(Libya) Al Ittihad	–
(Niger) USGN	–

== Format ==
In the group stage, each group was played on a home-and-away round-robin basis. The winners and runners-up of each group advanced to the quarter-finals of the knockout stage.

=== Tiebreakers ===
The teams were ranked according to points (3 points for a win, 1 point for a draw, 0 points for a loss). If tied on points, tiebreakers were applied in the following order (Regulations III. 20 & 21):

1. Points in head-to-head matches among tied teams;
2. Goal difference in head-to-head matches among tied teams;
3. Goals scored in head-to-head matches among tied teams;
4. Away goals scored in head-to-head matches among tied teams;
5. If more than two teams were tied, and after applying all head-to-head criteria above, a subset of teams were still tied, all head-to-head criteria above were reapplied exclusively to this subset of teams;
6. Goal difference in all group matches;
7. Goals scored in all group matches;
8. Away goals scored in all group matches;
9. Drawing of lots.

== Schedule ==
The schedule of each matchday was as follows.

Matchday	Dates	Matches
Matchday 1	13 February 2022	Team 1 vs. Team 4, Team 2 vs. Team 3
Matchday 2	20 February 2022	Team 3 vs. Team 1, Team 4 vs. Team 2
Matchday 3	27 February 2022	Team 4 vs. Team 3, Team 1 vs. Team 2
Matchday 4	13 March 2022	Team 3 vs. Team 4, Team 2 vs. Team 1
Matchday 5	20 March 2022	Team 4 vs. Team 1, Team 3 vs. Team 2
Matchday 6	3 April 2022	Team 1 vs. Team 3, Team 2 vs. Team 4

== Groups ==
=== Group A ===
Pos	Team	Pld	W	D	L	GF	GA	GD	Pts	Qualification	AHL	PYR	CSS	ZAN
1	(Libya) Al Ahli Tripoli	6	4	1	1	9	5	+4	13 (Note: Head-to-head points: Al Ahli Tripoli 3, Pyramids 3. Head-to-head goal differences: Al Ahli Tripoli 0, Pyramids 0. Head-to-head away goals: Al Ahli Tripoli 1, Pyramids 0)	Advance to knockout stage	—	1–0	2–1	2–0
2	(Egypt) Pyramids	6	4	1	1	7	3	+4	13	Advance to knockout stage	2–1	—	1–0	1–0
3	(Tunisia) CS Sfaxien	6	1	2	3	3	5	−2	5		0–0	1–1	—	1–0
4	(Zambia) Zanaco	6	1	0	5	3	9	−6	3		2–3	0–2	1–0	—

Source: CAF
Rules for classification: Group stage tiebreakers
Notes:
13 February 2022
18:00 UTC+2

Pyramids (Egypt)	2–1	(Libya) Al Ahli Tripoli
Issa 56'; El Karti 78'	Report	Al-Tubal 21'

30 June Stadium, Cairo
Referee: Mehdi Abid Charef (Algeria)
13 February 2022
20:00 UTC+1

CS Sfaxien (Tunisia)	1–0	(Zambia) Zanaco
Harzi 90+7' (pen.)	Report

Stade Hammadi Agrebi, Tunis (Note: CS Sfaxien play their group stage home matches at Stade Hammadi Agrebi, Tunis, instead of their regular home stadium Stade Taïeb Mhiri, Sfax, which did not meet CAF requirements.)
Referee: Kalilou Traore (Ivory Coast)

20 February 2022
15:00 UTC+2

Zanaco (Zambia)	0–2	(Egypt) Pyramids
	Report	Lakay 45+1', 83'

National Heroes Stadium, Lusaka
Referee: Pierre Atcho (Gabon)
20 February 2022
21:00 UTC+2

Al Ahli Tripoli (Libya)	2–1	(Tunisia) CS Sfaxien
Hammami 6' (o.g.); Al Taher 52'	Report	Harzi 87' (pen.)

Benina Martyrs Stadium, Benghazi
Referee: Samir Guezzaz (Morocco)

27 February 2022
18:00 UTC+2

Pyramids (Egypt)	1–0	(Tunisia) CS Sfaxien
Gabr 90+3'	Report

30 June Stadium, Cairo
Referee: Adil Zourak (Morocco)
27 February 2022
21:00 UTC+2

Al Ahli Tripoli (Libya)	2–0	(Zambia) Zanaco
El Trbi 79'; El Monir 85'	Report

Benina Martyrs Stadium, Benghazi
Referee: Joseph Odey Ogabor (Nigeria)

13 March 2022
15:00 UTC+2

Zanaco (Zambia)	2–3	(Libya) Al Ahli Tripoli
Siankombo 35'; Phiri 82'	Report	El Fakih 13' (pen.), 63' (pen.); Husayn 90+2'

National Heroes Stadium, Lusaka
Referee: Hassan Mohamed Hagi (Somalia)
13 March 2022
20:00 UTC+1

CS Sfaxien (Tunisia)	1–1	(Egypt) Pyramids
Chaouat 54'	Report	El Karti 44'

Stade Hammadi Agrebi, Tunis
Referee: Samuel Uwikunda (Rwanda)

20 March 2022
15:00 UTC+2

Zanaco (Zambia)	1–0	(Tunisia) CS Sfaxien
Musonda 31'	Report

National Heroes Stadium, Lusaka
Referee: Chelanget Sabila (Uganda)
20 March 2022
21:00 UTC+2

Al Ahli Tripoli (Libya)	1–0	(Egypt) Pyramids
Gaber 54' (o.g.)	Report

Benina Martyrs Stadium, Benghazi
Referee: Mohamed Ali Moussa (Niger)

3 April 2022
21:00 UTC+1

CS Sfaxien (Tunisia)	0–0	(Libya) Al Ahli Tripoli
	Report

Stade Hammadi Agrebi, Tunis
Referee: Sekou Ahmed Toure (Guinea)
3 April 2022
22:00 UTC+2

Pyramids (Egypt)	1–0	(Zambia) Zanaco
Issa 90'	Report

30 June Stadium, Cairo
Referee: Kouassi Attidgbe (Togo)

=== Group B ===
Pos	Team	Pld	W	D	L	GF	GA	GD	Pts	Qualification	ORL	ITT	JSS	ROL
1	(South Africa) Orlando Pirates	6	4	1	1	15	5	+10	13	Advance to knockout stage	—	0–0	2–0	3–0
2	(Libya) Al Ittihad	6	3	2	1	9	7	+2	11	Advance to knockout stage	3–2	—	1–1	3–2
3	(Algeria) JS Saoura	6	3	1	2	6	5	+1	10		0–2	1–0	—	2–0
4	(Eswatini) Royal Leopards	6	0	0	6	5	18	−13	0		2–6	1–2	0–2	—

Source: CAF
Rules for classification: Group stage tiebreakers
13 February 2022
18:00 UTC+2

Orlando Pirates (South Africa)	2–0	(Algeria) JS Saoura
Jele 3'; Shandu 66'	Report

Orlando Stadium, Johannesburg
Referee: Mahmood Ismail (Sudan)
6 March 2022 (Note: The Royal Leopards v Al Ittihad match, originally scheduled to be played on 13 February 2022, was rescheduled to be played on 6 March 2022 due to Royal Leopards late qualification.)
16:00 UTC+2

Royal Leopards (Eswatini)	1–2	(Libya) Al Ittihad
bin Ali 52' (o.g.)	Report	Eisay 2'; Al Khouja 35'

Mbombela Stadium, Mbombela (South Africa) (Note: Royal Leopards F.C. play their group stage home matches at Mbombela Stadium, Mbombela (South Africa), instead of their regular home stadium Simunye Park, Simunye, which did not meet CAF requirements.)
Referee: Celso Alvação (Mozambique)

20 February 2022
18:00 UTC+2

Al Ittihad (Libya)	3–2	(South Africa) Orlando Pirates
Al Warfali 14'; Eisay 28'; Al Khouja 53'	Report	Shandu 26', 45+1'

Benina Martyrs Stadium, Benghazi
Referee: Al Hadi Mahamat (Chad)
20 February 2022
20:00 UTC+1

JS Saoura (Algeria)	2–0	(Eswatini) Royal Leopards
Hamidi 9' (pen.); Hammia 90+3' (pen.)	Report

Stade du 5 Juillet, Algiers (Note: JS Saoura play their group stage home matches at Stade du 5 Juillet, Algiers, instead of their regular home stadium Stade 20 Août 1955, Béchar, which did not meet CAF requirements.)
Referee: Djindo Louis Houngnandandé (Benin)

27 February 2022
18:00 UTC+2

Al Ittihad (Libya)	1–1	(Algeria) JS Saoura
Zubya 22'	Report	Ouis 30'

Benina Martyrs Stadium, Benghazi
Referee: Daouda Gueye (Senegal)
27 February 2022
18:00 UTC+2

Royal Leopards (Eswatini)	2–6	(South Africa) Orlando Pirates
Mabelesa 6'; Mokenkoane 8'	Report	M. Dlamini 20' (o.g.); Shandu 38'; Peprah 45+1'; Jele 57'; K. Dlamini 60'; Dzvukamanja 80'

Mbombela Stadium, Mbombela (South Africa)
Referee: Messie Nkounkou (Congo)

13 March 2022
18:00 UTC+2

Orlando Pirates (South Africa)	3–0	(Eswatini) Royal Leopards
Makaringe 48'; K. Dlamini 56'; Dzvukamanja 70'	Report

Orlando Stadium, Johannesburg
Referee: Mohamed Athoumani (Comoros)
13 March 2022
20:00 UTC+1

JS Saoura (Algeria)	1–0	(Libya) Al Ittihad
Bellatreche 1'	Report

Stade du 5 Juillet, Algiers
Referee: Mahmoud El Banna (Egypt)

20 March 2022
18:00 UTC+2

Al Ittihad (Libya)	3–2	(Eswatini) Royal Leopards
Al Warfali 45+2' (pen.), 90+3'; Al-Misrati 70'	Report	Mokenkoane 58'; B. C. Dlamini 66'

Benina Martyrs Stadium, Benghazi
Referee: Fabricio Duarte (Cape Verde)
20 March 2022
20:00 UTC+1

JS Saoura (Algeria)	0–2	(South Africa) Orlando Pirates
	Report	Nyauza 48'; K. Dlamini 51'

Stade du 5 Juillet, Algiers
Referee: Mahamadou Kéïta (Mali)

3 April 2022
18:00 UTC+2

Royal Leopards (Eswatini)	0–2	(Algeria) JS Saoura
	Report	Saâdi 51'; Bellatreche 54'

Mbombela Stadium, Mbombela (South Africa)
Referee: Patrice Milazar (Mauritius)
3 April 2022
18:00 UTC+2

Orlando Pirates (South Africa)	0–0	(Libya) Al Ittihad
	Report

Orlando Stadium, Johannesburg
Referee: Samuel Uwikunda (Rwanda)

=== Group C ===
Pos	Team	Pld	W	D	L	GF	GA	GD	Pts	Qualification	TPM	MAS	ASO	COT
1	(Democratic Republic of the Congo) TP Mazembe	6	3	2	1	8	6	+2	11	Advance to knockout stage	—	2–0	1–0	1–0
2	(Egypt) Al Masry	6	3	1	2	5	3	+2	10	Advance to knockout stage	2–0	—	1–0	2–0
3	(Republic of the Congo) AS Otohô	6	2	2	2	5	5	0	8		2–2	1–0	—	1–1
4	(Cameroon) Coton Sport	6	0	3	3	3	7	−4	3		2–2	0–0	0–1	—

Source: CAF
Rules for classification: Group stage tiebreakers
13 February 2022
14:00 UTC+1

Coton Sport (Cameroon)	0–0	(Egypt) Al Masry
	Report

Roumdé Adjia Stadium, Garoua
Referee: Mohamed Ali Moussa (Niger)
13 February 2022
15:00 UTC+2

TP Mazembe (Democratic Republic of the Congo)	1–0	(Republic of the Congo) AS Otohô
Njoh 37'	Report

Stade TP Mazembe, Lubumbashi
Referee: Boubou Traore (Mali)

20 February 2022
18:00 UTC+2

Al Masry (Egypt)	2–0	(Democratic Republic of the Congo) TP Mazembe
Hamed 60'; Jlassi 67'	Report

Borg El Arab Stadium, Alexandria
Referee: Mutaz Ibrahim (Libya)
23 February 2022 (Note: AS Otohô v Coton Sport match, originally scheduled to be played on 20 February 2022, was rescheduled to be played on 23 February 2022.)
14:00 UTC+1

AS Otohô (Republic of the Congo)	1–1	(Cameroon) Coton Sport
Makiese 75'	Report	Ngomo 68'

Stade des Martyrs, Kinshasa (DR Congo) (Note: AS Otohô play their group stage home matches at Stade des Martyrs, Kinshasa (DR Congo), instead of their regular home stadium Stade Alphonse Massamba Debat, Brazzaville (Congo), which did not meet CAF requirements.)
Referee: Abdel Aziz Mohamed Bouh (Mauritania)

27 February 2022
15:00 UTC+2

TP Mazembe (Democratic Republic of the Congo)	1–0	(Cameroon) Coton Sport
Likonza 86'	Report

Stade TP Mazembe, Lubumbashi
Referee: Souleiman Ahmed Djama (Djibouti)
27 February 2022
17:00 UTC+1

AS Otohô (Republic of the Congo)	1–0	(Egypt) Al Masry
Okouri 87'	Report

Stade des Martyrs, Kinshasa (DR Congo)
Referee: Jean Ouattara (Burkina Faso)

13 March 2022
14:00 UTC+1

Coton Sport (Cameroon)	2–2	(Democratic Republic of the Congo) TP Mazembe
Marou 15'; Masengo 67' (o.g.)	Report	Kitambala 42'; Mondeko 90+5'

Roumdé Adjia Stadium, Garoua
Referee: Hélder Martins de Carvalho (Angola)
13 March 2022
18:00 UTC+2

Al Masry (Egypt)	1–0	(Republic of the Congo) AS Otohô
Ali 83'	Report

Borg El Arab Stadium, Alexandria
Referee: Ahmad Imtehaz Heeralall (Mauritius)

20 March 2022
15:00 UTC+2

Al Masry (Egypt)	2–0	(Cameroon) Coton Sport
Grendo 35'; Alaa 53'	Report

Borg El Arab Stadium, Alexandria
Referee: Jalal Jayed (Morocco)
20 March 2022
17:00 UTC+1

AS Otohô (Republic of the Congo)	2–2	(Democratic Republic of the Congo) TP Mazembe
Nkaya 66'; Ngombe 87'	Report	Kinzumbi 35'; Koffi 83'

Stade des Martyrs, Kinshasa (DR Congo)
Referee: Al Hadi Mahamat (Chad)

3 April 2022
15:00 UTC+2

TP Mazembe (Democratic Republic of the Congo)	2–0	(Egypt) Al Masry
Bossu 53', 75'	Report

Stade TP Mazembe, Lubumbashi
Referee: Daniel Nii Laryea (Ghana)
3 April 2022
20:00 UTC+1

Coton Sport (Cameroon)	0–1	(Republic of the Congo) AS Otohô
	Report	Cissé 7'

Roumdé Adjia Stadium, Garoua
Referee: Abdulkadir Artan (Somalia)

=== Group D ===
Pos	Team	Pld	W	D	L	GF	GA	GD	Pts	Qualification	RSB	SIM	ASE	USG
1	(Morocco) RS Berkane	6	3	1	2	11	9	+2	10 (Note: Head-to-head points: RS Berkane 3, Simba 3. Head-to-head goal differences: RS Berkane +1, Simba -1)	Advance to knockout stage	—	2–0	1–0	5–3
2	(Tanzania) Simba	6	3	1	2	9	7	+2	10	Advance to knockout stage	1–0	—	3–1	4–0
3	(Ivory Coast) ASEC Mimosas	6	3	0	3	9	8	+1	9		3–1	3–0	—	2–1
4	(Niger) USGN	6	1	2	3	9	14	−5	5		2–2	1–1	2–0	—

Source: CAF
Rules for classification: Group stage tiebreakers
Notes:
13 February 2022
16:00 UTC+3

Simba (Tanzania)	3–1	(Ivory Coast) ASEC Mimosas
Sakho 12'; Kapombe 79' (pen.); Banda 81'	Report	Ki 60'

National Stadium, Dar es Salaam
Referee: Souleiman Ahmed Djama (Djibouti)
13 February 2022
20:00 UTC+1

RS Berkane (Morocco)	5–3	(Niger) USGN
Fekkak 18', 20'; El Bahri 25'; Lukombe 65'; Naji 68'	Report	Adebayor 49', 81'; Boubacar 52'

Stade Municipal de Berkane, Berkane
Referee: Samuel Uwikunda (Rwanda)

20 February 2022
17:00 UTC+1

ASEC Mimosas (Ivory Coast)	3–1	(Morocco) RS Berkane
Ki 57'; Coulibaly 64'; Konaté 70'	Report	El Bahri 83'

Stade de l'Amitié, Cotonou (Benin) (Note: ASEC Mimosas play their group stage home matches at Stade de l'Amitié, Cotonou (Benin), instead of their regular home stadium Stade Félix Houphouët-Boigny, Abidjan (Ivory Coast), which did not meet CAF requirements.)
Referee: Janny Sikazwe (Zambia)
20 February 2022
17:00 UTC+1

USGN (Niger)	1–1	(Tanzania) Simba
Wilfried 12'	Report	Morrison 84'

Stade Général Seyni Kountché, Niamey
Referee: Tsegay Mogos Teklu (Eritrea)

27 February 2022
17:00 UTC+1

USGN (Niger)	2–0	(Ivory Coast) ASEC Mimosas
Wilfried 63'; Adebayor 90'	Report

Stade Général Seyni Kountché, Niamey
Referee: Komlanvi Aklassou (Togo)
27 February 2022
20:00 UTC+1

RS Berkane (Morocco)	2–0	(Tanzania) Simba
Ba 32'; El Bahri 41'	Report

Stade Municipal de Berkane, Berkane
Referee: Daniel Nii Laryea (Ghana)

13 March 2022
16:00 UTC+3

Simba (Tanzania)	1–0	(Morocco) RS Berkane
Sakho 44'	Report

National Stadium, Dar es Salaam
Referee: Jean Jacques Ndala Ngambo (DR Congo)
13 March 2022
17:00 UTC+1

ASEC Mimosas (Ivory Coast)	2–1	(Niger) USGN
Konaté 4' (pen.), 33'	Report	Adebayor 48' (pen.)

Stade de l'Amitié, Cotonou (Benin)
Referee: Bernard Camille (Seychelles)

20 March 2022
17:00 UTC+1

USGN (Niger)	2–2	(Morocco) RS Berkane
Adebayor 36', 62'	Report	El Fahli 22' (pen.); Fekkak 90'

Stade Général Seyni Kountché, Niamey
Referee: Ahmed El Ghandour (Egypt)
20 March 2022
17:00 UTC+1

ASEC Mimosas (Ivory Coast)	3–0	(Tanzania) Simba
Kramo 16'; Ki 25'; Konaté 57'	Report

Stade de l'Amitié, Cotonou (Benin)
Referee: Abdulrazg Ahmed (Libya)

3 April 2022
19:00 UTC+0

RS Berkane (Morocco)	1–0	(Ivory Coast) ASEC Mimosas
Lukombe 28' (pen.)	Report

Stade Municipal de Berkane, Berkane
Referee: Issa Sy (Senegal)
3 April 2022
22:00 UTC+3

Simba (Tanzania)	4–0	(Niger) USGN
Kanouté 63'; Mugalu 68', 78'; Hamisu 84' (o.g.)	Report

National Stadium, Dar es Salaam
Referee: Hélder Martins de Carvalho (Angola)
