= 2021–22 Al Masry SC season =

Al Masry
2021–22 season
- Manager: Moïne Chaâbani (until 29 May); Hossam Hassan (from 30 May)
- Stadium: Borg El Arab Stadium
- Premier League: 13th
- Egypt Cup: Quarter-finals
- CAF Confederation Cup: Quarter-finals
- Top goalscorer: League: Hassan Ali; Austin Amutu; Mohamed Grendo (5 each); All: Mohamed Grendo (7)
Home colours	Away colours

The 2021–22 season was the 102nd season of Al Masry SC. The team are participating in the Egyptian Premier League and Egypt Cup, the domestic cup.

== Players ==
As of 24 December 2021

Note: Flags indicate national team as defined under FIFA eligibility rules; some limited exceptions apply. Players may hold more than one non-FIFA nationality.

No.	Pos.	Nation	Player
1	GK	EGY	Essam Tharwat
2	DF	EGY	Alaa Atta
4	DF	EGY	Islam Gamal
5	MF	EGY	Farid Shawky
6	MF	EGY	Haggag Oweis
7	DF	EGY	Karim El Eraki
8	DF	EGY	Amr Moussa
9	FW	EGY	Amr Marey
10	MF	EGY	Hassan Ali
11	FW	EGY	Ahmed Hamoudi
12	DF	EGY	Ahmed Shedid Qenawi (Captain)
13	DF	EGY	Islam Salah
14	MF	TUN	Elyes Jelassi
15	MF	EGY	Islam Ateya
16	GK	EGY	Ahmed Massoud

No.	Pos.	Nation	Player
17	FW	NGR	Austin Amutu
18	MF	EGY	Mostafa Soltan
19	FW	PLE	Mohammed Balah
20	MF	NGR	Emeka Christian Eze
21	FW	EGY	Mohamed Grendo
22	FW	EGY	Ahmed El Sheikh
24	DF	EGY	Ahmed Shousha
25	MF	EGY	Mohamed Antar
27	DF	EGY	Ahmed Alaa
29	FW	EGY	Hussein Ragab
30	DF	EGY	Islam Abou Salima
31	GK	EGY	Mohamed Shehata
34	FW	EGY	Mohamed El Gamal
38	DF	EGY	Islam El Mizzayn
39	MF	EGY	Ziad Farag

== Competitions ==
=== Overall record ===
Competition	First match	Last match	Starting round	Final position	Record							
Competition	First match	Last match	Starting round	Final position	Pld	W	D	L	GF	GA	GD	Win %
Egyptian Premier League	28 October 2021	30 August 2022	Matchday 1	13th	34	8	14	12	40	41	−1	23.53
Egypt Cup	12 June 2022	26 November 2022	First round	Quarter-finals	3	2	0	1	3	2	+1	66.67
CAF Confederation Cup	16 October 2021	25 April 2022	Second round	Quarter-finals	12	6	2	4	10	7	+3	50.00
Total					49	16	16	17	53	50	+3	32.65

Source: Soccerway

=== Premier League ===
==== League table ====
Pos	Team	Pld	W	D	L	GF	GA	GD	Pts
11	Ismaily	34	9	11	14	27	39	−12	38 (Note: Head-to-Head points: Al Mokawloon Al Arab 12, Ismaily 11, Al Ittihad 5, Al Masry 4.)
12	Al Ittihad	34	9	11	14	40	52	−12	38
13	Al Masry	34	8	14	12	40	41	−1	38
14	Ceramica Cleopatra	34	7	16	11	34	41	−7	37
15	Ghazl El Mahalla	34	7	15	12	26	37	−11	36 (Note: Head-to-Head points: Ghazl El Mahalla 4, El Gouna 1.)

Source: Soccerway
Rules for classification: 1) Points; 2) Head-to-Head points; 3) Head-to-Head goal difference; 4) Head-to-Head goals scored; 5) Head-to-Head away goals scored; 6) Goal difference; 7) Goals scored.
(Note: Head-to-head record is used only after all the matches between the teams in question have been played).

==== Results summary ====
Overall								Home						Away					
Pld	W	D	L	GF	GA	GD	Pts	W	D	L	GF	GA	GD	W	D	L	GF	GA	GD
34	8	14	12	40	41	−1	38	4	8	5	17	18	−1	4	6	7	23	23	0

Source: worldfootball

==== Results by round ====
Round	1	2	3	4	5	6	7	8	9	10	11	12	13	14	15	16	17	18	19	20	21	22	23	24	25	26	27	28	29	30	31	32	33	34
Ground	A	H	A	H	A	H	A	H	H	A	H	A	H	A	H	A	H	H	A	H	A	H	A	H	A	A	H	A	H	A	H	A	H	A
Result	D	D	D	D	W	W	W	L	D	D	D	L	W	L	L	L	L	D	L	L	L	W	W	D	D	W	L	D	D	L	W	D	D	L
Position	8	13	13	10	8	4	4	5	6	5	5	6	5	6	8	9	11	12	12	13	14	13	10	12	12	10	11	12	12	12	10	10	9	10

Source: worldfootball
A = Away; H = Home; W = Win; D = Draw; L = Loss

==== Matches ====
The league fixtures were announced on 12 October 2021.

28 October 2021 1	Ghazl El Mahalla	1–1	Al Masry	Alexandria
17:30				Stadium: Borg El Arab Stadium

1 November 2021 2	Al Masry	0–0	Smouha	Alexandria
17:30		Report		Stadium: Borg El Arab Stadium

5 November 2021 3	Future	1–1	Al Masry	Alexandria
17:30		Report		Stadium: Borg El Arab Stadium

19 November 2021 4	Al Masry	2–2	Pyramids	Alexandria
15:00		Report		Stadium: Borg El Arab Stadium

22 November 2021 5	El Gouna	0–3	Al Masry	Alexandria
20:00		Report		Stadium: Borg El Arab Stadium

13 December 2021 6	Al Masry	3–2	Misr Lel Makkasa	Alexandria
17:30		Report		Stadium: Borg El Arab Stadium

20 December 2021 7	Pharco	0–1	Al Masry	Alexandria
15:00		Report		Stadium: Borg El Arab Stadium

24 December 2021 8	Al Masry	0–1	Al Ittihad	Alexandria
20:00		Report		Stadium: Borg El Arab Stadium

17 February 2022 9	Al Masry	1–1	Ceramica Cleopatra	Alexandria
16:30				Stadium: Borg El Arab Stadium; Referee: Mahmoud Nagi

23 February 2022 10	Eastern Company	2–2	Al Masry	Alexandria
14:00		Report		Stadium: Borg El Arab Stadium; Referee: Ibrahim Ghuloum Mohamed (United Arab Emirates)

3 March 2022 11	Al Masry	2–2	ENPPI	Alexandria
16:30				Stadium: Borg El Arab Stadium

9 March 2022 12	Tala'ea El Gaish	1–0	Al Masry	Alexandria
16:30	Beniangba 13'	Report		Stadium: Borg El Arab Stadium

9 April 2022 13	Al Masry	1–0	Al Ahly	Alexandria
21:30				Stadium: Borg El Arab Stadium

28 April 2022 16	Zamalek	2–1	Al Masry	Alexandria
21:30				Stadium: Borg El Arab Stadium; Referee: Mohamed Maarouf Eid Mansour

1 May 2022 17	Al Masry	0–2	Al Mokawloon	Alexandria
21:30		Report		Stadium: Borg El Arab Stadium

6 May 2022 14	Ismaily	3–2	Al Masry	Alexandria
17:30				Stadium: Borg El Arab Stadium; Referee: Mohamed El Hanafi

11 May 2022 18	Al Masry	1–1	Ghazl El Mahalla	Alexandria
16:00		Report		Stadium: Borg El Arab Stadium

16 May 2022 19	Smouha	2–1	Al Masry	Alexandria
20:00				Stadium: Borg El Arab Stadium

22 May 2022 20	Al Masry	0–1	Future	Alexandria
18:30		Report		Stadium: Borg El Arab Stadium

26 May 2022 15	Al Masry	1–3	National Bank	Alexandria
19:30				Stadium: Borg El Arab Stadium

29 May 2022 21	Pyramids	3–1	Al Masry	Cairo
19:30		Report		Stadium: 30 June Stadium

18 June 2022 22	Al Masry	1–0	El Gouna	Alexandria
20:00		Report		Stadium: Borg El Arab Stadium

26 June 2022 23	Misr Lel Makkasa	0–2	Al Masry	Cairo
20:00				Stadium: Osman Ahmed Osman Stadium

13 July 2022 24	Al Masry	0–0	Pharco	Alexandria
19:30				Stadium: Borg El Arab Stadium

18 July 2022 25	Al Ittihad	0–0	Al Masry	Alexandria
20:00				Stadium: Alexandria Stadium

22 July 2022 26	Ceramica Cleopatra	1–4	Al Masry	Suez
18:30				Stadium: Suez Stadium

26 July 2022 27	Al Masry	1–2	Eastern Company	Alexandria
18:30				Stadium: Borg El Arab Stadium

30 July 2022 28	ENPPI	1–1	Al Masry	Cairo
18:30				Stadium: Petro Sport Stadium

4 August 2022 29	Al Masry	0–0	Tala'ea El Gaish	Alexandria
21:00				Stadium: Borg El Arab Stadium

10 August 2022 30	Al Ahly	2–0	Al Masry	Cairo
21:00				Stadium: Al Salam Stadium

18 August 2022 31	Al Masry	4–1	Ismaily	Alexandria
18:30		Report		Stadium: Borg El Arab Stadium

23 August 2022 32	National Bank	2–2	Al Masry	Cairo
20:00		Report		Stadium: Police Academy Stadium

26 August 2022 33	Al Masry	0–0	Zamalek	Alexandria
21:00		Report		Stadium: Borg El Arab Stadium; Referee: Walid Abdelrazek

30 August 2022 34	Al Mokawloon	2–1	Al Masry	Alexandria
21:30	Kabore 5' (pen.); Okoli 30'	Report	Alaa Eldin 71'	Stadium: Borg El Arab Stadium; Referee: Mohamed El Hanafi

=== Egypt Cup ===
12 June 2022 Round of 32	Al Masry	2–1	El Mansoura	Alexandria
18:30		Report		Stadium: Borg El Arab Stadium

7 July 2022 Round of 16	Al Masry	1–0	Eastern Company	Alexandria
19:00	Grendo 79' (pen.)			Stadium: Borg El Arab Stadium

26 November 2022 Quarter-finals	Zamalek	1–0	Al Masry	Alexandria
17:00	Sika 59'	Report		Stadium: Borg El Arab Stadium; Referee: Abdelaziz El Sayed

=== CAF Confederation Cup ===
==== Second round ====
16 October 2021 First leg	URA Football Club (Uganda)	0–0	(Egypt) Al Masry	Entebbe, Uganda
16:00				Stadium: St. Mary's Stadium-Kitende

23 October 2021 Second leg	Al Masry (Egypt)	1–0 (1–0 agg.)	(Uganda) URA Football Club	Alexandria, Egypt
19:00				Stadium: Alexandria Stadium

==== Play-off round ====
28 November 2021 First leg	Rivers United (Nigeria)	2–1	(Egypt) Al Masry	Aba, Uganda
16:00				Stadium: Enyimba International Stadium

5 December 2021 Second leg	Al Masry (Egypt)	1–0 (2 (a)–2 agg.)	(Nigeria) Rivers United	Alexandria, Egypt
19:00				Stadium: Borg El Arab Stadium

==== Group stage ====
The draw for the group stage was held on 28 December 2021.

Pos	Team	Pld	W	D	L	GF	GA	GD	Pts	Qualification	TPM	MAS	ASO	COT
1	(Democratic Republic of the Congo) TP Mazembe	6	3	2	1	8	6	+2	11	Advance to knockout stage	—	2–0	1–0	1–0
2	(Egypt) Al Masry	6	3	1	2	5	3	+2	10	Advance to knockout stage	2–0	—	1–0	2–0
3	(Republic of the Congo) AS Otohô	6	2	2	2	5	5	0	8		2–2	1–0	—	1–1
4	(Cameroon) Coton Sport	6	0	3	3	3	7	−4	3		2–2	0–0	0–1	—

Source: CAF
Rules for classification: Group stage tiebreakers

13 February 2022 1	Coton Sport (Cameroon)	0–0	(Egypt) Al Masry	Garoua, Cameroon
14:00		Report		Stadium: Roumdé Adjia Stadium

20 February 2022 2	Al Masry (Egypt)	2–0	(Democratic Republic of the Congo) TP Mazembe	Alexandria, Egypt
18:00		Report		Stadium: Borg El Arab Stadium

27 February 2022 3	AS Otohô (Republic of the Congo)	1–0	(Egypt) Al Masry	Kinshasa, DR Congo
17:00		Report		Stadium: Stade des Martyrs

13 March 2022 4	Al Masry (Egypt)	1–0	(Republic of the Congo) AS Otohô	Alexandria, Egypt
18:00		Report		Stadium: Borg El Arab Stadium

20 March 2022 5	Al Masry (Egypt)	2–0	(Cameroon) Coton Sport	Alexandria, Egypt
15:00		Report		Stadium: Borg El Arab Stadium

3 April 2022 6	TP Mazembe (Democratic Republic of the Congo)	2–0	(Egypt) Al Masry	Lubumbashi, DR Congo
15:00		Report		Stadium: Stade TP Mazembe

==== Knockout stage ====
===== Quarter-finals =====
17 April 2022 First leg	Al Masry (Egypt)	2–1	(Morocco) RS Berkane	Alexandria, Egypt
22:00 UTC+2	Marey 10'; Ayouni 83'	Report	Regragui 17'	Stadium: Borg El Arab Stadium; Attendance: 10,000; Referee: Boubou Traore (Mali)

24 April 2022 Second leg	RS Berkane (Morocco)	1–0 (2 (a)–2 agg.)	(Egypt) Al Masry	Berkane, Morocco
22:00 UTC+0	El Fahli 7' (pen.)	Report		Stadium: Stade Municipal de Berkane; Attendance: 10,000; Referee: Sadok Selmi (Tunisia)
