= 2021–22 CAF Confederation Cup =

International football competition in Africa

2021–22 TotalEnergies CAF Confederation Cup
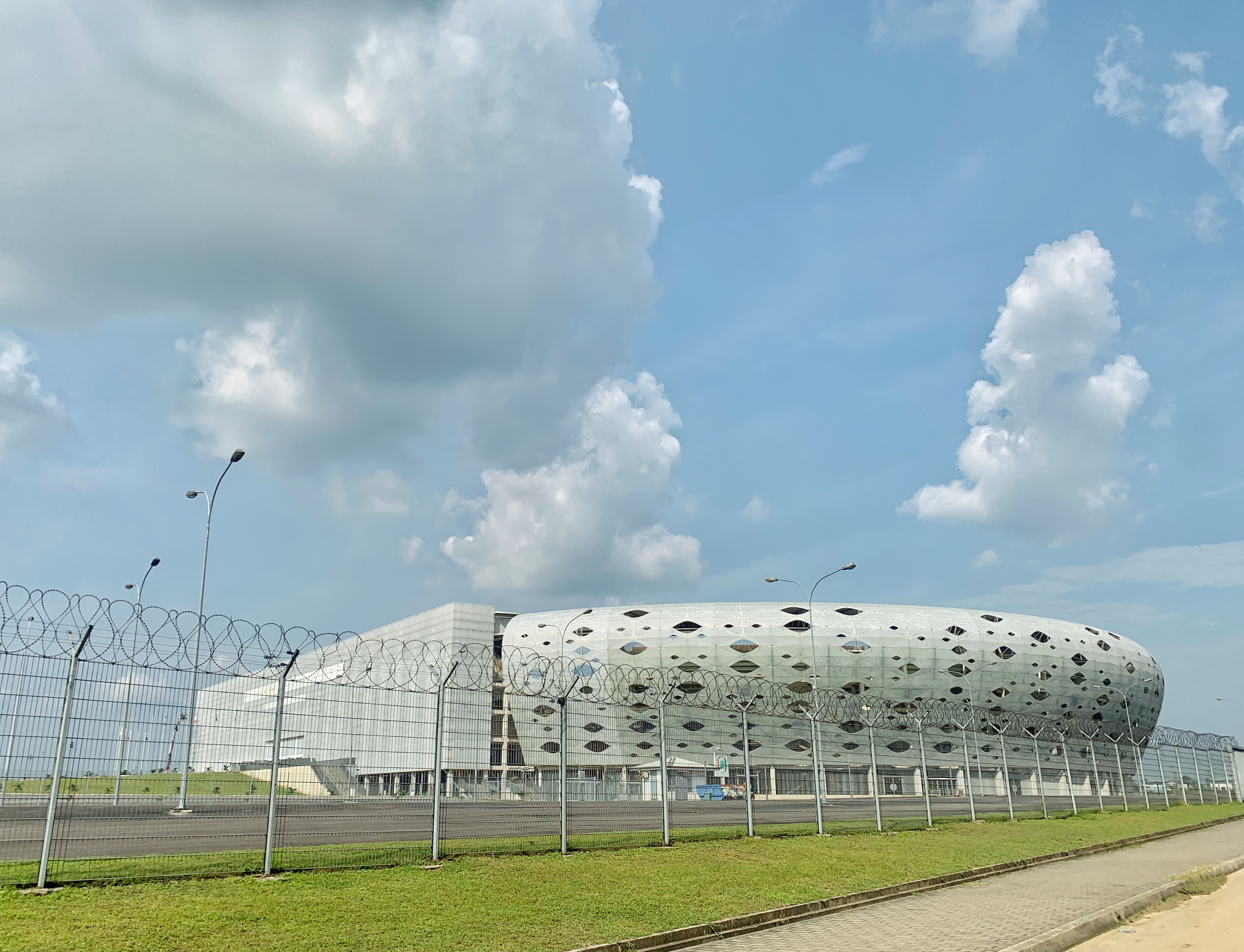
- Godswill Akpabio International Stadium in Uyo, Nigeria, hosted the final.

Tournament details
- Dates: Qualifying: 10 September 2021 – 6 February 2022; Competition proper: 13 February – 20 May 2022
- Teams: Competition proper: 16; Total: 51+16 (from 39 associations)

Final positions
- Champions: (Morocco) RS Berkane (2nd title)
- Runners-up: (South Africa) Orlando Pirates

Tournament statistics
- Matches played: 61
- Goals scored: 136 (2.23 per match)
- Top scorer(s): (Niger) Victorien Adebayor (6 goals)
- (Note: All statistics do not include qualifying play-offs)

The 2021–22 CAF Confederation Cup (officially the 2021–22 TotalEnergies CAF Confederation Cup for sponsorship reasons) was the 19th edition of Africa's secondary club football tournament organized by the Confederation of African Football (CAF) under the current CAF Confederation Cup title after the merger of CAF Cup and African Cup Winners' Cup.

The defending champions Raja Casablanca were unable to defend their title as they advanced to the group stage of the that season's CAF Champions League. The final was won by RS Berkane of Morocco 5–4 on penalties after a 1–1 draw after 120 minutes of regulation time against Orlando Pirates and RS Berkane at the Godswill Akpabio International Stadium in Uyo, Nigeria, capturing their second title in the process.

As winners, RS Berkane earned the right to play against the winners of the 2021–22 CAF Champions League, Wydad Casablanca, in the 2022 CAF Super Cup.

== Association team allocation ==
All 54 CAF member associations may enter the competition, with the 12 highest ranked associations according to their CAF 5-year ranking eligible to enter two teams in the competition. As a result, theoretically a maximum of 68 teams could enter the tournament (plus 16 teams eliminated from the CAF Champions League which enter the play-off round) – although this level has never been reached.

For the 2020–21 season, CAF utilized the 2016–2020 CAF 5-year ranking, which calculates points for each entrant association based on their clubs' performance over the previous 5 seasons in CAF's club competitions. The criteria for points are as follows:

	CAF Champions League	CAF Confederation Cup
Winners	6 points	5 points
Runners-up	5 points	4 points
Losing semi-finalists	4 points	3 points
Losing quarter-finalists (from 2017)	3 points	2 points
3rd place in groups	2 points	1 point
4th place in groups	1 point	0.5 point

The points are multiplied by a coefficient according to the year as follows:

- 2020–21: x 5
- 2019–20: × 4
- 2018–19: × 3
- 2018: × 2
- 2017: × 1

== Teams ==
The following 51 teams from 39 associations entered the competition.

- Teams in **bold** received a bye to the second round.
- The other teams entered the first round.

Associations are shown according to their 2017–2021 CAF 5-year ranking – those with a ranking score have their rank and score (in parentheses) indicated.

Associations eligible to enter two teams (Top 12 associations)
Association	Rank (Pts)	Team	Qualifying method
Morocco	1 (190)	AS FAR	2020–21 Botola third place
Morocco	1 (190)	**RS Berkane**	2020–21 Botola fourth place
Egypt	2 (167)	**Al Masry**	2020–21 Egyptian Premier League third place after 29 rounds
Egypt	2 (167)	**Pyramids**	2020–21 Egyptian Premier League fourth place after 29 rounds
Tunisia	3 (140)	US Ben Guerdane	2020–21 Tunisian Ligue Professionnelle 1 third place
Tunisia	3 (140)	**CS Sfaxien**	2020–21 Tunisian Cup winners
DR Congo	4 (83)	**AS Vita Club**	2020–21 Linafoot third place
DR Congo	4 (83)	**DC Motema Pembe**	2021 Coupe du Congo winners
Algeria	5 (81)	**JS Saoura**	2020–21 Algerian Ligue Professionnelle 1 third place
Algeria	5 (81)	**JS Kabylie**	2020–21 Algerian League Cup winners
South Africa	6 (68.5)	**Orlando Pirates FC**	2020–21 South African Premier Division third place
South Africa	6 (68.5)	Marumo Gallants F.C.	2020–21 Nedbank Cup winners
Zambia	7 (43)	Red Arrows F.C.	2020–21 Zambian Super League third place
Zambia	7 (43)	Kabwe Warriors F.C.	2020–21 Zambian Super League fourth place
Nigeria	8 (39)	**Enyimba**	2020–21 Nigeria Professional Football League third place
Nigeria	8 (39)	Bayelsa United F.C.	2021 Nigeria FA Cup winners
Guinea	9 (38)	Wakriya AC	2020–21 Guinée Championnat National third place
Guinea	9 (38)	AS Ashanti Golden Boys	2021 Guinée Coupe Nationale runners-up
Angola	10 (36)	**Primeiro de Agosto**	2020–21 Girabola third place
Angola	10 (36)	G.D. Interclube	2020–21 Angola Cup winners
Sudan	11 (29.5)	Hay Al-Wadi SC	2020–21 Sudan Premier League third place
Sudan	11 (29.5)	Al-Ahli Merowe	2020–21 Sudan Cup winners
Tanzania	12 (16.5)	Azam F.C.	2020–21 Tanzanian Premier League third place
Tanzania	12 (16.5)	Biashara United^{[TAN]}	2020–21 Tanzanian Premier League fourth place

Associations eligible to enter one team
Association	Rank (Pts)	Team	Qualifying method
Cameroon	13 (14)	**Coton Sport FC**	2020–21 Elite One runners-up
Senegal	14 (13)	Diambars FC	2020–21 Senegal FA Cup winners
Libya	15 (11)	Al Ahli Tripoli	2021 Libyan Cup winners
Ivory Coast	16 (9)	FC San Pédro	2020–21 Ligue 1 runners-up
Kenya	17 (9)	**Gor Mahia F.C.**	2021 FKF President's Cup winners
Congo	18 (8)	CSMD Diables Noirs	2020 Coupe du Congo winners
Uganda	18 (8)	Uganda Revenue Authority	2020–21 Uganda Premier League runners-up
Mali	20 (6.5)	Binga FC	2020–21 Malian Cup runners-up
Rwanda	22 (6)	A.S. Kigali	2021 Rwandan Cup winners
Eswatini	23 (5)	Young Buffaloes F.C.	2020–21 Eswatini Premier League runners-up
Ethiopia	24 (4)	Ethiopian Coffee S.C.	2020–21 Ethiopian Premier League runners-up
Botswana	25 (3)	Orapa United F.C.	2020–21 Mascom Top 8 Cup winners
Togo	25 (3)	ASC Kara	2020–21 Togolese Championnat National runners-up
Benin	27 (2.5)	Les Buffles du Borgou	2021 Benin Cup winners
Mauritania	27 (2.5)	ASAC Concorde	2021 Coupe du Président de la République winners
Burkina Faso	29 (2)	ASFA Yennenga	2020–21 Burkinabé Premier League runners-up
Gabon	31 (1)	AS Mangasport	2020 Gabon Championnat National D1 runners-up
Burundi	—	Bumamuru FC	2021 Burundian Cup winners
Comoros	—	Olympique de Missiri	2021 Comoros Cup winners
Djibouti	—	FC Dikhil	2021 Djibouti Cup winners
Equatorial Guinea	—	Futuro Kings FC	2020–21 Equatoguinean Primera División winners
Niger	—	AS Police	2021 Niger Cup winners
Somalia	—	Horseed FC	2021 Somalia Cup winners
South Sudan	—	Atlabara FC	2021 South Sudan National Cup winners
Zanzibar	—	Mafunzo F.C.	2021 Zanzibari Cup winners
Madagascar	—	CFFA	2021 Coupe de Madagascar winners
Liberia	—	MC Breweries	2021 Liberian FA Cup winners

^{[TAN]} Both the winners Simba SC and runner-ups Young Africans S.C. of the 2020–21 Tanzania FA Cup qualified for the 2021-22 CAF Champions League resulting in the slot usually allocated to the winner or runner-up of the Tanzania FA Cup to be awarded to the fourth placed team in the 2020–21 Tanzanian Premier League.

Notes

1. Egypt (EGY): The 2020–21 Egyptian Premier League was not finished by the CAF deadline. As a result, the Egyptian Football Association announced that Al Masry and Pyramids, who were at third and fourth place after 29 rounds respectively, will represent Egypt in the 2021–22 CAF Confederation Cup.

== Schedule ==
Schedule for 2021–22 CAF Confederation Cup
Phase	Round	Draw date	First leg	Second leg
Qualifying	First round	13 August 2021	10–12 September 2021	17–19 September 2021
Qualifying	Second round	13 August 2021	15–17 October 2021	22–24 October 2021
Qualifying	Play-off round	26 October 2021	28 November 2021	5 December 2021
Group stage	Matchday 1	28 December 2021	13 February 2022	
Group stage	Matchday 2	28 December 2021	20 February 2022	
Group stage	Matchday 3	28 December 2021	27 February 2022	
Group stage	Matchday 4	28 December 2021	13 March 2022	
Group stage	Matchday 5	28 December 2021	20 March 2022	
Group stage	Matchday 6	28 December 2021	3 April 2022	
Knockout stage	Quarter-finals	5 April 2022	17 April 2022	24 April 2022
Knockout stage	Semi-finals	5 April 2022	8 May 2022	15 May 2022
Knockout stage	Final	5 April 2022	20 May 2022 at Godswill Akpabio International Stadium, Uyo	

== Qualifying rounds ==
=== First round ===
Team 1	Agg.	Team 2	1st leg	2nd leg
US Ben Guerdane (Tunisia)	3–2	(Niger) AS Police	3–1	0–1
AS FAR (Morocco)	3–1	(Benin) Les Buffles du Borgou	3–1	0–0
Diambars FC (Senegal)	3–0 (Note: Matches involving Guinean clubs were played over a single leg in their opponent's country due to the political and security situation in Guinea following a coup d'état.)	(Guinea) Wakriya AC		
AS Ashanti Golden Boys (Guinea)	2–4	(Nigeria) Bayelsa United		
ASC Kara (Togo)	3–4	(Mauritania) ASAC Concorde	3–0	0–4
Azam (Tanzania)	4–1	(Somalia) Horseed	3–1	1–0
URA Football Club (Uganda)	5–2	(Ethiopia) Ethiopian Coffee	2–1	3–1
Atlabara (South Sudan)	0–4	(Sudan) Al-Ahli Merowe	0–2	0–2
Futuro Kings (Equatorial Guinea)	2–4	(South Africa) Marumo Gallants	2–1	0–3
AS Mangasport (Gabon)	0–0 (2–3 p)	(Botswana) Orapa United	0–0	0–0
Bumamuru (Burundi)	0–1	(Republic of the Congo) CSMD Diables Noirs	0–0	0–1
Red Arrows (Zambia)	2–1	(Eswatini) Young Buffaloes	2–1	0–0
Olympique de Missiri (Comoros)	1–8	(Rwanda) AS Kigali	1–2	0–6
Binga FC (Mali)	5–0	(Liberia) MC Breweries	3–0	2–0
ASFA Yennenga (Burkina Faso)	2–1	(Ivory Coast) FC San Pédro	0–0	2–1
FC Dikhil (Djibouti)	0–3	(Tanzania) Biashara United	0–1	0–2
Hay Al-Wadi SC (Sudan)	0–4 (Note: The first leg was originally scheduled to be played on 12 September 2021 at El-Obeid Stadium, El-Obeid, but was cancelled due to concerns over the suitability of the venue. The match was played over a single leg at the venue for the second leg.)	(Libya) Al Ahli Tripoli		
CFFA (Madagascar)	2–1	(Zambia) Kabwe Warriors	0–0	2–1
Mafunzo (Zanzibar)	0–4	(Angola) Interclube	0–1	0–3

=== Second round ===
Team 1	Agg.	Team 2	1st leg	2nd leg
US Ben Guerdane (Tunisia)	0–5	(Morocco) RS Berkane	0–1	0–4
AS FAR (Morocco)	1–3	(Algeria) JS Kabylie	0–1	1–2
Diambars FC (Senegal)	0–4	(Nigeria) Enyimba	0–1	0–3
Bayelsa United (Nigeria)	1–4	(Tunisia) CS Sfaxien	1–0	0–4
ASAC Concorde (Mauritania)	2–3	(Algeria) JS Saoura	1–2	1–1
Azam (Tanzania)	0–1	(Egypt) Pyramids	0–0	0–1
URA Football Club (Uganda)	0–1	(Egypt) Al Masry	0–0	0–1
Al-Ahli Merowe (Sudan)	w/o (Note: Gor Mahia won on a walkover after Al-Ahli Merowe withdrew from the second leg in Kenya.)	(Kenya) Gor Mahia	1–3	—
Marumo Gallants (South Africa)	3–2	(Democratic Republic of the Congo) AS Vita Club	2–1	1–1
Orapa United (Botswana)	2–2 (a)	(Cameroon) Coton Sport	2–1	0–1
CSMD Diables Noirs (Republic of the Congo)	0–1	(South Africa) Orlando Pirates	0–0	0–1
Red Arrows (Zambia)	1–0	(Angola) Primeiro de Agosto	1–0	0–0
AS Kigali (Rwanda)	2–4	(Democratic Republic of the Congo) DC Motema Pembe	1–2	1–2
Binga FC (Mali)	1–1 (7–6 p)	(Burkina Faso) ASFA Yennenga	0–1	1–0
Biashara United (Tanzania)	w/o (Note: Al Ahli SC won on a walkover after Biashara United failed to appear for the second leg in Libya.)	(Libya) Al Ahli Tripoli	2–0	—
CFFA (Madagascar)	w/o (Note: Interclube won on a walkover after CFFA withdrew from the second leg in Angola.)	(Angola) Interclube	0–3	—

=== Play-off round ===
Eliminated from 2021–22 CAF Champions League:

- (Republic of the Congo) AS Otohô
- (Democratic Republic of the Congo) AS Maniema Union
- (Democratic Republic of the Congo) TP Mazembe
- (Ivory Coast) ASEC Mimosas
- (Algeria) JS Kabylie
- (Ghana) Hearts of Oak
- (Kenya) Tusker
- (Liberia) LPRC Oilers
- (Libya) Al Ittihad
- (Mali) Stade Malien
- (Mauritania) FC Nouadhibou
- (Nigeria) Rivers United
- (Niger) USGN
- (Rwanda) APR
- (Tanzania) Simba
- (Zambia) Zanaco

Team 1	Agg.	Team 2	1st leg	2nd leg
Zanaco (Zambia)	3–2	(Mali) Binga FC	3–0	0–2
Simba (Tanzania)	4–2	(Zambia) Red Arrows	3–0	1–2
TP Mazembe (Democratic Republic of the Congo)	1–0	(South Africa) Marumo Gallants	1–0	0–0
ASEC Mimosas (Ivory Coast)	5–2	(Angola) Interclube	2–0	3–2
FC Nouadhibou (Mauritania)	0–2	(Cameroon) Coton Sport	0–0	0–2
USGN (Niger)	2–1	(Democratic Republic of the Congo) DC Motema Pembe	2–0	0–1
AS Otohô (Republic of the Congo)	2–1	(Kenya) Gor Mahia	1–0	1–1
APR (Rwanda)	1–2	(Morocco) RS Berkane	0–0	1–2
Tusker (Kenya)	0–1	(Tunisia) CS Sfaxien	0–0	0–1
Hearts of Oak (Ghana)	2–4	(Algeria) JS Saoura	2–0	0–4
Rivers United (Nigeria)	2–2 (a)	(Egypt) Al Masry	2–1	0–1
Stade Malien (Mali)	1–1 (2–4 p)	(Libya) Al Ahli Tripoli	1–0	0–1
Al Ittihad (Libya)	w/o (Note: Al Ittihad won on a walkover after Enyimba failed to travel to Libya for the first leg.)	(Nigeria) Enyimba	—	0–2
AS Maniema Union (Democratic Republic of the Congo)	0–2	(Egypt) Pyramids	0–1	0–1
LPRC Oilers (Liberia)	w/o (Note: Orlando Pirates won on a walkover after LPRC Oilers withdrew from the second leg in South Africa.)	(South Africa) Orlando Pirates	0–2	—
Royal Leopards (Eswatini)	2–2 (a)	(Algeria) JS Kabylie	1–0	1–2

== Group stage ==
In the group stage, each group was played on a home-and-away round-robin basis. The winners and runners-up of each group advanced to the quarter-finals of the knockout stage.

Tiebreakers
The teams were ranked according to points (3 points for a win, 1 point for a draw, 0 points for a loss). If tied on points, tiebreakers were applied in the following order (Regulations III. 20 & 21):
1. Points in head-to-head matches among tied teams;
2. Goal difference in head-to-head matches among tied teams;
3. Goals scored in head-to-head matches among tied teams;
4. Away goals scored in head-to-head matches among tied teams;
5. If more than two teams were tied, and after applying all head-to-head criteria above, a subset of teams were still tied, all head-to-head criteria above were reapplied exclusively to this subset of teams;
6. Goal difference in all group matches;
7. Goals scored in all group matches;
8. Away goals scored in all group matches;
9. Drawing of lots.

=== Group A ===
Pos	Team	Pld	W	D	L	GF	GA	GD	Pts	Qualification	AHL	PYR	CSS	ZAN
1	(Libya) Al Ahli Tripoli	6	4	1	1	9	5	+4	13 (Note: Head-to-head points: Al Ahli Tripoli 3, Pyramids 3. Head-to-head goal differences: Al Ahli Tripoli 0, Pyramids 0. Head-to-head away goals: Al Ahli Tripoli 1, Pyramids 0)	Advance to knockout stage	—	1–0	2–1	2–0
2	(Egypt) Pyramids	6	4	1	1	7	3	+4	13	Advance to knockout stage	2–1	—	1–0	1–0
3	(Tunisia) CS Sfaxien	6	1	2	3	3	5	−2	5		0–0	1–1	—	1–0
4	(Zambia) Zanaco	6	1	0	5	3	9	−6	3		2–3	0–2	1–0	—

Source: CAF

=== Group B ===
Pos	Team	Pld	W	D	L	GF	GA	GD	Pts	Qualification	ORL	ITT	JSS	ROL
1	(South Africa) Orlando Pirates	6	4	1	1	15	5	+10	13	Advance to knockout stage	—	0–0	2–0	3–0
2	(Libya) Al Ittihad	6	3	2	1	9	7	+2	11	Advance to knockout stage	3–2	—	1–1	3–2
3	(Algeria) JS Saoura	6	3	1	2	6	5	+1	10		0–2	1–0	—	2–0
4	(Eswatini) Royal Leopards	6	0	0	6	5	18	−13	0		2–6	1–2	0–2	—

Source: CAF

=== Group C ===
Pos	Team	Pld	W	D	L	GF	GA	GD	Pts	Qualification	TPM	MAS	ASO	COT
1	(Democratic Republic of the Congo) TP Mazembe	6	3	2	1	8	6	+2	11	Advance to knockout stage	—	2–0	1–0	1–0
2	(Egypt) Al Masry	6	3	1	2	5	3	+2	10	Advance to knockout stage	2–0	—	1–0	2–0
3	(Republic of the Congo) AS Otohô	6	2	2	2	5	5	0	8		2–2	1–0	—	1–1
4	(Cameroon) Coton Sport	6	0	3	3	3	7	−4	3		2–2	0–0	0–1	—

Source: CAF

=== Group D ===
Pos	Team	Pld	W	D	L	GF	GA	GD	Pts	Qualification	RSB	SIM	ASE	USG
1	(Morocco) RS Berkane	6	3	1	2	11	9	+2	10 (Note: Head-to-head points: RS Berkane 3, Simba 3. Head-to-head goal differences: RS Berkane +1, Simba -1)	Advance to knockout stage	—	2–0	1–0	5–3
2	(Tanzania) Simba	6	3	1	2	9	7	+2	10	Advance to knockout stage	1–0	—	3–1	4–0
3	(Ivory Coast) ASEC Mimosas	6	3	0	3	9	8	+1	9		3–1	3–0	—	2–1
4	(Niger) USGN	6	1	2	3	9	14	−5	5		2–2	1–1	2–0	—

Source: CAF

== Knockout stage ==
The mechanism of the draws for each round was as follows:

- In the draw for the quarter-finals, the four group winners were seeded, and the four group runners-up were unseeded. The seeded teams were drawn against the unseeded teams, with the seeded teams hosting the second leg. Teams from the same group could not be drawn against each other, while teams from the same association can be drawn against each other.
- In the draws for semi-finals, there were no seedings, and teams from the same group or the same association could be drawn against each other. As the draws for the quarter-finals and semi-finals were held together before the quarter-finals were played, the identity of the quarter-final winners was not known at the time of the semi-final draw.

Group	Winners	Runners-up
A	(Libya) Al Ahli Tripoli	(Egypt) Pyramids
B	(South Africa) Orlando Pirates	(Libya) Al Ittihad
C	(Democratic Republic of the Congo) TP Mazembe	(Egypt) Al Masry
D	(Morocco) RS Berkane	(Tanzania) Simba

=== Bracket ===
The bracket was decided after the draw for the knockout stage (quarter-finals and semi-finals), which was held on 5 April 2022, 13:00 GMT (15:00 local time, UTC+2), at the CAF headquarters in Cairo, Egypt.

Quarter-finals
(Libya) Al Ittihad	0	0	0
(Libya) Al Ahli Tripoli	0	1	1
(Tanzania) Simba	1	0	1 (3)
(South Africa) Orlando Pirates (p)	0	1	1 (4)
(Egypt) Pyramids	0	0	0
(Democratic Republic of the Congo) TP Mazembe	0	2	2
(Egypt) Al Masry	2	0	2
(Morocco) RS Berkane (a)	1	1	2

Semi-finals
(Libya) Al Ahli Tripoli	0	1	1
(South Africa) Orlando Pirates	2	0	2
(Democratic Republic of the Congo) TP Mazembe	1	1	2
(Morocco) RS Berkane	0	4	4

Final
20 May – Uyo
(South Africa) Orlando Pirates	1 (4)
(Morocco) RS Berkane (p)	1 (5)

=== Quarter-finals ===
Team 1	Agg.	Team 2	1st leg	2nd leg
Simba (Tanzania)	1–1 (3–4 p)	(South Africa) Orlando Pirates	1–0	0–1
Al Ittihad (Libya)	0–1	(Libya) Al Ahli Tripoli	0–0	0–1
Pyramids (Egypt)	0–2	(Democratic Republic of the Congo) TP Mazembe	0–0	0–2
Al Masry (Egypt)	2–2 (a)	(Morocco) RS Berkane	2–1	0–1

=== Semi-finals ===
Team 1	Agg.	Team 2	1st leg	2nd leg
Al Ahli Tripoli (Libya)	1–2	(South Africa) Orlando Pirates	0–2	1–0
TP Mazembe (Democratic Republic of the Congo)	2–4	(Morocco) RS Berkane	1–0	1–4

=== Final ===
The final was played on 20 May 2022 at Godswill Akpabio International Stadium, Uyo.

20 May 2022
20:00 UTC+1

Orlando Pirates (South Africa)	1–1 (a.e.t.)	(Morocco) RS Berkane
Lorch 117'	Report	El Fahli 97' (pen.)
Penalties
Jele (penalty scored); Lorch (penalty missed); Mabaso (penalty scored); Monare (penalty scored); Ofori (penalty scored)	4–5	(penalty scored) El Moussaoui; (penalty scored) Zghoudi; (penalty scored) Mokadem; (penalty scored) Dayo; (penalty scored) El Bahraoui

Godswill Akpabio International Stadium, Uyo
Referee: Janny Sikazwe (Zambia)

== Top goalscorers ==
Team eliminated / inactive for this round.

Rank	Player	Team	MD1	MD2	MD3	MD4	MD5	MD6	QF1	QF2	SF1	SF2	F	Total
1	(Niger) Victorien Adebayor	(Niger) USGN	2		1	1	2							6
2	(Morocco) Youssef El Fahli	(Morocco) RS Berkane					1			1		2	1	5
3	(South Africa) Bandile Shandu	(South Africa) Orlando Pirates	1	2	1									4
3	(Ivory Coast) Karim Konaté	(Ivory Coast) ASEC Mimosas		1		2	1							4
5	(Morocco) Charki El Bahri	(Morocco) RS Berkane	1	1	1									3
5	(Burkina Faso) Stephane Aziz Ki	(Ivory Coast) ASEC Mimosas	1	1			1							3
5	(Morocco) Mouad Fekkak	(Morocco) RS Berkane	2				1							3
5	(Libya) Sanad Al Warfali	(Libya) Al Ittihad		1			2							3
5	(South Africa) Kabelo Dlamini	(South Africa) Orlando Pirates			1	1	1							3

== See also ==
- 2021–22 CAF Champions League
