= List of JS Saoura records and statistics =

This list includes the major honours won by JS Saoura and all-time statistics and records set by the club, its players and its coaches. The players section includes the club's top goalscorers and those who have made most appearances in first-team competitive matches. It also displays international achievements by players representing JS Saoura, and the highest transfer fees paid and received by the club.

== Players ==
=== Appearances ===
- Most appearances: Mohamed El Amine Hammia – 283 (2014–2025);
- Most appearances in a season: Belaid Hamidi (2021–22) – 43;
- Most league appearances: Mohamed El Amine Hammia – 246 (2014–2025);
- Most Algerian Cup appearances: Nabil Bousmaha – 10 (2012–18);
- Most african Cup appearances: Mohamed El Amine Hammia – 21 (2014–2025);
- Most league appearances by a non-Algerian player: Jean-Jules Bapidi – 88 (2014–2018);
- Youngest debutant:
- Youngest starter in the league:
- Youngest league debutant: Islam Ben Yezli – 17 years, 10 months and 16 days (against NC Magra, 2020–21 Algerian Ligue Professionnelle 1, 30 May 2021);
- Youngest debutant in the African Cup / CAF Champions League: Messala Merbah – 22 years, 6 months and 18 days (against Enugu Rangers, 2017 CAF Champions League preliminary round, first leg, 10 February 2017);
- Youngest captain in the African Cup / CAF Champions League:
- Youngest debutant in a CAF competition: Marwane Khelif – 21 years, 8 months and 8 days (against ASAC Concorde, 2021–22 CAF Confederation Cup second round, first leg, 16 October 2021);

==== Most appearances ====
Competitive matches only, includes appearances as used substitute. Numbers in brackets indicate goals scored. (Note: The statistics of all the games except 2019–20 Arab Club Champions Cup Preliminary round. Statistics correct as of game against CS Constantine on June 5, 2026.)

#	Name	Years	League	Cup	Others^{1}	Africa^{2}	Total
1	(Algeria) Mohamed El Amine Hammia	2014–25	246 (31)	12 (3)	4 (1)	21 (5)	283 (40)
2	(Algeria) Adel Bouchiba	2018–	220 (3)	12 (0)	6 (0)	20 (0)	258 (3)
3	(Algeria) Nabil Bousmaha	2012–18	169 (1)	10 (0)	0 (0)	4 (0)	183 (1)
4	(Algeria) Abdeldjalil Saâd	2012–24	154 (26)	11 (1)	3 (0)	14 (1)	182 (28)
5	(Algeria) Hamza Zaidi	2015–21	146 (23)	9 (5)	2 (0)	10 (0)	167 (28)
6	(Algeria) Messala Merbah	2014–19	108 (2)	7 (0)	0 (0)	11 (0)	126 (2)
7	(Algeria) Aimen Lahmeri	2018–23	101 (23)	6 (1)	3 (1)	14 (4)	124 (29)
8	(Algeria) Abdenour Belkheir	2012–16	107 (6)	3 (0)	0 (0)	0 (0)	110 (6)
9	(Algeria) Moustapha Djallit	2015–19	93 (34)	8 (1)	0 (0)	6 (0)	107 (35)
10	(Algeria) Sid Ali Yahia-Chérif	2017–19	88 (19)	6 (2)	3 (1)	8 (3)	105 (25)

^{1} ^{Includes the Super Cup, League Cup and UAFA Club Cup.} ^{2} ^{Includes the Confederation Cup and Champions League.}

=== Goalscorers ===
- Most goals: 35 – Moustapha Djallit;
- Most league goals: 34 – Moustapha Djallit;
- Most goals in international club competitions: 5 – Mohamed El Amine Hammia;
- Most goals in international club competitions in a season: 4 – Aimen Lahmeri;
- Youngest league scorer: Islam Ben Yezli – 18 years and 6 months (4–1 against Paradou AC, 2021–22 Algerian Ligue Professionnelle 1, 16 January 2022).
- Youngest hat-trick scorer: Billel Messaoudi – 22 years, 4 months and 2 days (5–0 against Volcan Club, 2019–20 Arab Club Champions Cup, 19 August 2019).

==== Top goalscorers in all competitions ====
Matches played (including as used substitute) appear in brackets.

#	Name	Years	League	Cup	Others^{1}	Africa^{2}	Total
1	(Algeria) Moustapha Djallit	2015–19	34 (93)	1 (8)	0 (0)	0 (6)	35 (107)
2	(Algeria) Hamza Zaidi	2015–21	23 (146)	5 (9)	0 (2)	0 (10)	28 (167)
3	(Algeria) Mohamed El Amine Hammia	2014–	19 (188)	2 (9)	1 (2)	5 (20)	27 (219)
4	(Algeria) Billel Messaoudi	2017–21	21 (45)	2 (3)	3 (3)	0 (0)	26 (51)
5	(Algeria) Belaid Hamidi	2019–22	22 (83)	1 (2)	1 (2)	1 (9)	25 (96)
6	(Algeria) Aimen Lahmeri	2018–	20 (85)	0 (3)	1 (2)	4 (12)	25 (102)
7	(Algeria) Sid Ali Yahia-Chérif	2017–19	19 (88)	2 (6)	1 (3)	3 (8)	25 (105)
8	(Algeria) Abdeldjalil Saâd	2012–	20 (112)	0 (5)	0 (1)	1 (12)	21 (130)
9	(Algeria) Kaddour Beldjilali	2011–14, 2019	19 (92)	0 (2)	0 (0)	0 (0)	19 (94)
10	(Algeria) Abderrahmane Bourdim	2016–18	13 (49)	2 (7)	0 (0)	1 (2)	16 (58)

^{1} ^{Includes the Super Cup, League Cup and UAFA Club Cup.} ^{2} ^{Includes the Confederation Cup and Champions League.}

==== Top goalscorers in international club competitions ====
Matches played (including as substitute) appear in brackets.

Rank	Name	Nationality	Years	Total	Ref
1	Mohamed El Amine Hammia	Algeria	2014–25	5 (20)	
2	Aimen Lahmeri	Algeria	2018–23	4 (12)	
=	Oussama Bellatreche	Algeria	2021–24	4 (10)	
4	Sid Ali Yahia-Chérif	Algeria	2017–19	3 (8)	

=== Transfers ===
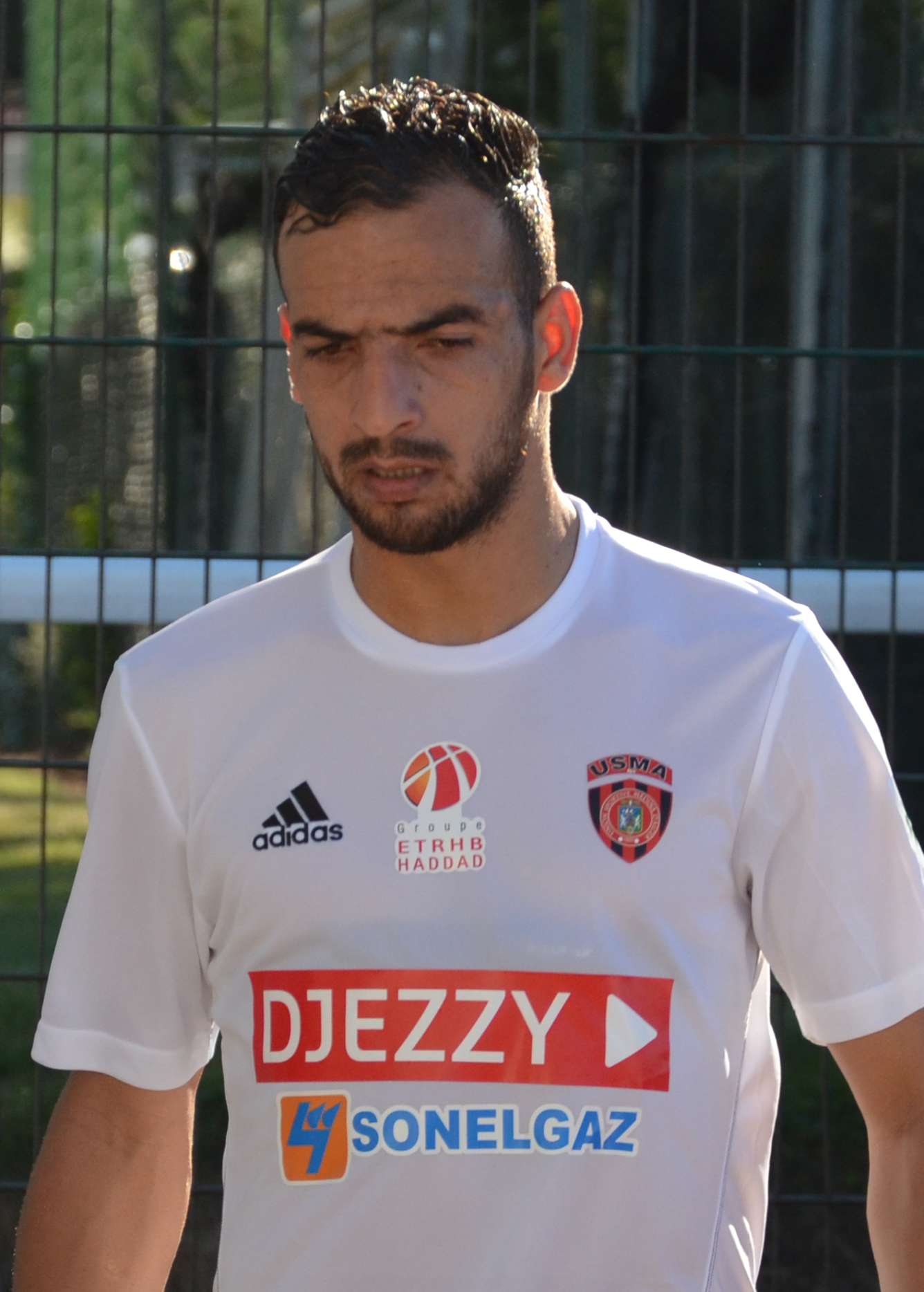
The transfers of Kaddour Beldjilali represent respectively the highest player fees ever paid by JS Saoura.

Highest player fees paid by JS Saoura
#	Name	Nationality	Fee	Previous club	Date	Ref
1	Kaddour Beldjilali	Algeria	360,000 €	Étoile du Sahel (Tunisia)	8 July 2014	
2	Marwane Khelif	Algeria	80,000,000 DA	MC Alger (Algeria)	4 August 2024	
3	Belaid Hamidi	Algeria	35,000,000 DA	CR Belouizdad (Algeria)	24 July 2022	

== Management ==
=== Coaches ===
- Most matches: 54 – Karim Khouda;
- Most matches in international club competitions:

== Club ==
=== Matches ===
- Most official matches in a season: 44 (2021–22);
- Best league start:

==== Firsts ====
- First match:
- First Ligue 1 match: JS Saoura 0–1 CR Belouizdad (2012–13 Algerian Ligue Professionnelle 1, 15 September 2012);
- First Algerian Cup match:
- First League Cup match: JS Saoura 4–0 JSM Skikda (2020–21 Algerian League Cup, 8 May 2021);
- First match in international club competitions: JS Saoura 1–1 Enugu Rangers (2017 CAF Champions League, 10 February 2017);

==== Wins ====
- Biggest win:
- Biggest Algerian Cup win:
- Biggest Ligue 1 win:
- Biggest win in international club competitions: 4–0 (against Hearts of Oak, 2021–22 CAF Confederation Cup playoffs round, 5 December 2021);
- Most wins in a season: 22 (2021–22);
- Most consecutive league wins in a season: 6 in 30 matches (2017–18);
- Fewest wins in the league in a season: 9 (2019–20 Algerian Ligue Professionnelle 1);
- Most consecutive away league wins in a season:
- Most international club competition wins in a season: 5 in 10 matches (2021–22 CAF Confederation Cup);
- Most consecutive international club competition wins in a season:

==== Defeats ====
- Biggest defeat:
- Biggest Algerian Cup defeat:
- Biggest Ligue 1 defeat:
- Biggest defeat in international club competitions:
- Most defeats in the league in a season: 12 (2012–13 Algerian Ligue Professionnelle 1);
- Fewest defeats in the league in a season: 6 (2015–16 Algerian Ligue Professionnelle 1);
- Most consecutive home matches without defeats: 58 (from 6 February 2015 to 1 September 2018);
- Most consecutive home matches without defeats in the league: 53 (from 6 February 2015 to 1 September 2018);
- Most consecutive matches without defeats in the league:

=== Goals ===
- First goal in international club competitions: (against Enugu Rangers, 2017 CAF Champions League, preliminary round, 10 February 2017);
- Most league goals scored in a season: 60 (in 38 matches, 2020–21 Algerian Ligue Professionnelle 1);
- Fewest league goals scored in a season: 19 (in 22 matches, 2019–20 Algerian Ligue Professionnelle 1);
- Most league goals conceded in a season: 36 (in 30 matches, 2013–14 Algerian Ligue Professionnelle 1);
- Fewest league goals conceded in a season: 18 (in 22 matches, 2019–20 Algerian Ligue Professionnelle 1);
- Most international club competition goals scored in a season: 13 (in 10 matches, 2021–22 CAF Confederation Cup);
- Most league minutes without conceding goals:
- Most consecutive league matches scoring goals: 9 (15 January –12 March 2021);

=== Points ===
- Most points in a season: 69 (in 38 matches, 2020–21 Algerian Ligue Professionnelle 1);
- Fewest points in a season: 33 (in 22 matches, 2019–20 Algerian Ligue Professionnelle 1);

== See also ==
- JS Saoura in international club football
