= Richard Ofori =

Richard Ofori may refer to:

- Richard Ofori (defender) (born 1993), Ghanaian football defender
- Richard Ofori (goalkeeper) (born 1993), Ghanaian football goalkeeper
