= Binga FC =

Association football club in Mali

- Full name: Binga Football Club
- League: Malian Première Division
- 2025–26: 5th

Binga FC is a Malian football club based in Bamako. They play in the Malian Première Division as of the 2022–23 season, having been promoted from the second level at the end of the previous season.

== History ==
Binga FC reached the final of the 2021 Malian Cup, losing 3–2 to Stade Malien; in fact, Binga had been leading 2–0 as late as the 86th minute before Stade Malien scored the first of their three goals (all by Issaka Samaké). However, they qualified for the 2021–22 CAF Confederation Cup as Stade Malien won the league, thus qualifying for the 2021–22 CAF Champions League.

In their first season in African competition, they defeated MC Breweries of Liberia in the first round, and ASFA Yennenga Burkina Faso of Burkina Faso in the second round. The club could not afford to fly, so travelled over 1300 km by minibus to both countries.

They were drawn against Zambian club Zanaco in the 3rd round, with the fixture in doubt due to the logistical challenges resulting from Binga's lack of funds. With the 1st leg in Zambia scheduled for 28 November, and the 2nd leg in Mali on 5 December, travelling by road would entail a round trip of 15,000 km and would prove a challenging obstacle. They would eventually lose to Zanaco 2–3 on aggregate (0–3 away, 2–0 at home).

In the 2021–22 season, Binga FC finished at the top of the Bamako regional championship (one of the many second-level feeder leagues to the Malian Première Division), qualifying for the promotion play-offs, before winning their group without dropping any points, thus being promoted to the Première Division alongside US Bougouni for the 2022–23 season.

== Honours ==
- Malien Cup:

2021 (finalist)

== League and cup history ==
=== Performance in CAF competitions ===
As of October 2021

Season	Competition	Round	Country	Club	Home	Away	Aggregate
2021-22	CAF Confederation Cup	1	(Liberia)	MC Breweries	3–0	0–2	5–0
2021-22	CAF Confederation Cup	2	(Burkina Faso)	ASFA Yennenga	0–1	1–0	1–1(p)
2021-22	CAF Confederation Cup	3	(Zambia)	MC Zanaco	0-3	2-0	2-3
