= Victory Beniangba =

Nigerian footballer (born 2003)

Personal information
- Date of birth: 15 June 2003 (age 23)
- Place of birth: Yenagoa, Nigeria
- Height: 1.93 m (6 ft 4 in)
- Position: Forward

Team information
- Current team: Jong Genk
- Number: 50

Youth career
- Young Boys FA

Senior career*
Years	Team	Apps	(Gls)
–2021	Bayelsa United		
2021–2022	Ceramica Cleopatra	0	(0)
2022	→ Tala'ea El Gaish (loan)	18	(6)
2022–	Jong Genk	71	(25)
2024–2025	→ Servette (loan)	6	(0)
- * Club domestic league appearances and goals as of 20 April 2026

Victory Beniangba (born 15 June 2003) is a Nigerian footballer who plays for Belgian club Jong Genk.

== Career ==
Beniangba played at the Young Boys Football Academy, before joining his local side Bayelsa United FC, for whom he played in the CAF Confederation Cup in 2021. He signed with the Egyptian side Ceramica Cleopatra, but was immediately loaned to Cairo-based side Tala'ea El Gaish SC in February 2022. He scored six goals in eighteen games in the Egyptian Premier League for Tala’ea El Gaish.

Beniangba became a transfer target for K.R.C. Genk in August 2022. The signing was seen as controversial by Spanish side Celta Vigo who considered themselves as signing the player and appealed to FIFA for regulation. In September 2022 Beniangba made his debut for Jong Genk in the Challenger Pro League. He scored his first goal for Jong Genk on October 16, 2022, in a 3–2 home win over RSCA Futures.

On 17 July 2024, Beniangba joined Servette in Switzerland on loan with an option to buy.

== Personal life ==
In January 2023 it was revealed Beniangba had married his girlfriend in a traditional ceremony.
