= Ahmed Alaa =

Egyptian footballer (born 1994)

Personal information
- Full name: Ahmed Alaa Eldin
- Date of birth: January 1, 1994 (age 32)
- Place of birth: Cairo, Egypt
- Position: Centre back

Senior career*
Years	Team	Apps	(Gls)
2017–2018	El Dakhleya	26	(2)
2018–2021	Al Ahly	5	(0)
2019–2021	Tala'ea El Gaish (loan)	9	(0)
2021–2022	Al Masry		
2022–2024	Al Mokawloon Al Arab	55	(3)
- * Club domestic league appearances and goals

Ahmed Alaa Eldin (Arabic: أَحْمَد عَلَاء الدِّين; born January 1, 1994), widely known as simply Ahmed Alaa, is an Egyptian footballer who plays as a defender.
