= Shomari Kapombe =

Tanzanian footballer (born 1992)

Personal information
- Date of birth: 28 January 1992 (age 34)
- Place of birth: Morogoro, Tanzania
- Height: 1.80 m (5 ft 11 in)
- Position: Right-back

Team information
- Current team: Simba
- Number: 12

Youth career
- Morogoro Youth Academy
- –2011: Police Morogoro

Senior career*
Years	Team	Apps	(Gls)
2011–2013	Simba		
2013–2014	Cannes	2	(0)
2014–2017	Azam		
2017–	Simba		

International career^{‡}
2011–	Tanzania	89	(1)
- * Club domestic league appearances and goals as of 21 August 2013 ‡ National team caps and goals as of 19:30, 23 December 2025 (UTC)

Shomari Salum Kapombe (born 28 January 1992) is a Tanzanian professional footballer who plays as a right-back for Tanzanian Premier League club Simba and the Tanzania national team.

Kapombe appeared for Tanzania at the 2014 World Cup qualifiers.

== International career ==
=== International goals ===
Scores and results list Tanzania's goal tally first.

Goal	Date	Venue	Opponent	Score	Result	Competition
1.	10 June 2012	National Stadium, Dar es Salaam, Tanzania	Gambia	1–1	2–1	2014 FIFA World Cup qualification

== Honours ==
- Tanzanian Premier League: 2011–12 2017-2018, 2018-2019, 2019-2020, 2020-2021.
- FAT CUP:

2019-2020, 2020-2021.

- COMMUNITY SHIELD

2011, 2012, 2017, 2018, 2019, 2020.
