= Hamza El Moussaoui =

Moroccan footballer

Personal information
- Full name: Hamza El Moussaoui
- Date of birth: April 7, 1993 (age 33)
- Place of birth: Fnideq, Morocco
- Height: 1.82 m (6 ft 0 in)
- Position: Left-back

Team information
- Current team: RS Berkane
- Number: 19

Senior career*
Years	Team	Apps	(Gls)
2015–2018	Moghreb Tétouan	64	(3)
2018–2019	ASFAR	22	(0)
2019–2021	Moghreb Tétouan	53	(5)
2021-	RS Berkane	119	(4)
Total		245	(12)

International career
2021–	Morocco	14	(1)
Medal record
Men's football
Representing Morocco
African Nations Championship
Winner	2020 Cameroon
FIFA Arab Cup
Winner	2025 Qatar	Team
- * Club domestic league appearances and goals

Hamza El Moussaoui (Arabic: حمزة الموساوي; born 7 April 1993) is a Moroccan professional footballer who plays as a left-back for RS Berkane and the Morocco national team.

A youth product of Moghreb Tétouan, El Mousssaoui began his career with the club. He moved to ASFAR for the 2019–20 season, before returning to Moghreb Tétouan.

== International career ==
El Moussaoui represented the Morocco national team in their title winning campaign at the 2020 African Nations Championship, where he played in all six matches and scored a goal. El Moussaoui was also part of the Morocco national team at the 2021 FIFA Arab Cup.

== Career statistics ==
=== International ===
Scores and results list Morocco's goal tally first.

No.	Date	Venue	Opponent	Score	Result	Competition
1.	16 January 2021	Stade de la Réunification, Douala, Cameroon	Uganda	3–1	5–2	2020 African Nations Championship

== Honours ==
RS Berkane

- Botola Pro: 2024–25
- Moroccan Throne Cup: 2020–21, 2021–22
- CAF Confederation Cup: 2021–22, 2024–25
- CAF Super Cup: 2022

Morocco A'

- African Nations Championship: 2020
- FIFA Arab Cup: 2025

=== Individual ===
- African Nations Championship Team of the Tournament: 2020
- Botola Pro Team of the Season: 2020–21
