= Christian Koffi =

Ivorian footballer

Personal information
- Full name: Christian Raoul Kouamé Koffi
- Date of birth: 21 December 1990 (age 35)
- Place of birth: Dabou, Ivory Coast
- Height: 1.88 m (6 ft 2 in)
- Position: Defensive midfielder

Senior career*
Years	Team	Apps	(Gls)
2013–2014	Séwé Sport de San-Pédro		
2014–2023	TP Mazembe	269	(24)

International career^{‡}
2014–2021	Ivory Coast	7	(0)
- * Club domestic league appearances and goals ‡ National team caps and goals as of 1st August 2026

Christian Koffi (born 21 December 1990) is an Ivorian professional footballer who plays as a midfielder. He has appeared in seven matches for his national team, but has yet to register a goal.
