= Oussama Bellatreche =

Algerian footballer (born 1995)

Personal information
- Date of birth: 3 July 1995 (age 31)
- Place of birth: Tlemcen, Algeria
- Height: 1.86 m (6 ft 1 in)
- Position: Winger

Team information
- Current team: Hidd SCC

Youth career
- JS Saoura: –2016

Senior career*
Years	Team	Apps	(Gls)
2016–2017	JS Saoura	17	(2)
2018	WA Tlemcen	11	(3)
2018–2019	RC Kouba	12	(0)
2019–2021	WA Tlemcen	30	(6)
2021–2024	JS Saoura	59	(20)
2024	USM Alger	4	(0)
2024–2025	Al-Khaldiya SC		
2025–	Hidd SCC		
- * Club domestic league appearances and goals as of 10 May 2024

Oussama Bellatreche (Arabic: أسامة بلطرش; born 3 July 1995) is an Algerian professional footballer who plays for Hidd SCC.

== Club career ==
On 16 August 2021, Bellatreche joined JS Saoura. On 29 January 2024, he signed a two-and-a-half-year contract with USM Alger. On 11 September 2024, Bellatreche joined Baihrini club Al-Khaldiya SC.He was released after only four months.On 15 September 2025, Bellatreche joined Baihrini club Hidd SCC.
