= Brahim El Bahraoui =

Moroccan footballer

Personal information
- Date of birth: 30 July 1992 (age 34)
- Place of birth: Safi, Morocco
- Height: 1.77 m (5 ft 10 in)
- Position: Striker

Team information
- Current team: Olympic Safi

Senior career*
Years	Team	Apps	(Gls)
2011–2017	Olympic Club de Safi	80	(11)
2017–2019	FUS de Rabat	32	(8)
2019–2020	Rapide Oued Zem	30	(16)
2020–2023	RS Berkane	53	(12)
2023–	Olympic Safi	14	(1)
- * Club domestic league appearances and goals as of 19 March 2024

Brahim El Bahraoui (Arabic: إبراهيم البحراوي; born 30 July 1992) is a professional football player who currently plays for Olympic Safi.
