= Thabang Monare =

South African soccer player

Personal information
- Full name: Thabang Amod Monare
- Date of birth: 16 September 1989 (age 37)
- Place of birth: Embalenhle, South Africa
- Height: 1.78 m (5 ft 10 in)
- Position: Central midfielder

Team information
- Current team: Cape Town City
- Number: 8

Senior career*
Years	Team	Apps	(Gls)
2012–2016	Jomo Cosmos	99	(6)
2016–2020	Bidvest Wits	95	(4)
2020-2024	Orlando Pirates	61	(1)
2024–2026	Sekhukhune United	33	(3)
2026-	Cape Town City	2	(0)

International career^{‡}
2015–	South Africa	11	(0)
- * Club domestic league appearances and goals as of 4 January 2026 ‡ National team caps and goals as of 12 October 2024

Thabang Amod Monare (born 16 September 1989) is a South African professional soccer player who plays as a central midfielder for National First Division club Cape Town City.

== Honours ==
Bidvest Wits

- 2016–17 South African Premier Division

Orlando Pirates

- 2022–23 Nedbank Cup

South Africa

- Africa Cup of Nations third place: 2023
