= Youssef El Fahli =

Moroccan footballer (born 1997)

Personal information
- Date of birth: 27 April 1997 (age 29)
- Place of birth: Morocco
- Height: 1.82 m (6 ft 0 in)
- Position: Forward

Team information
- Current team: AS FAR
- Number: 7

Youth career
- –2019: Hassania Agadir

Senior career*
Years	Team	Apps	(Gls)
2019–2021	Hassania Agadir	64	(15)
2021–2024	RS Berkane	73	(16)
2024–	AS FAR	27	(12)
- * Club domestic league appearances and goals as of 11 May 2025

Youssef El Fahli (Arabic: يوسف الفحلي; born 27 April 1997) is a Moroccan professional footballer who plays as a forward for Moroccan club AS FAR.

== Career ==
On 15 May 2022, El Fail scored a brace in the semi-final against TP Mazembe, in a 4–1 victory, to send his team to the 2022 CAF Confederation Cup Final. He scored in the final, resulting in a 1–1 draw, which ended up claiming the title through penalties against Orlando Pirates.

== Honours ==
RS Berkane

- Moroccan Throne Cup: 2020–21, 2021–22
- CAF Confederation Cup: 2021–22
- CAF Super Cup: 2022

Individual

- Botola Pro Top Goalscorer: 2024–25 (11 goals)
