= Larbi Naji =

Moroccan footballer

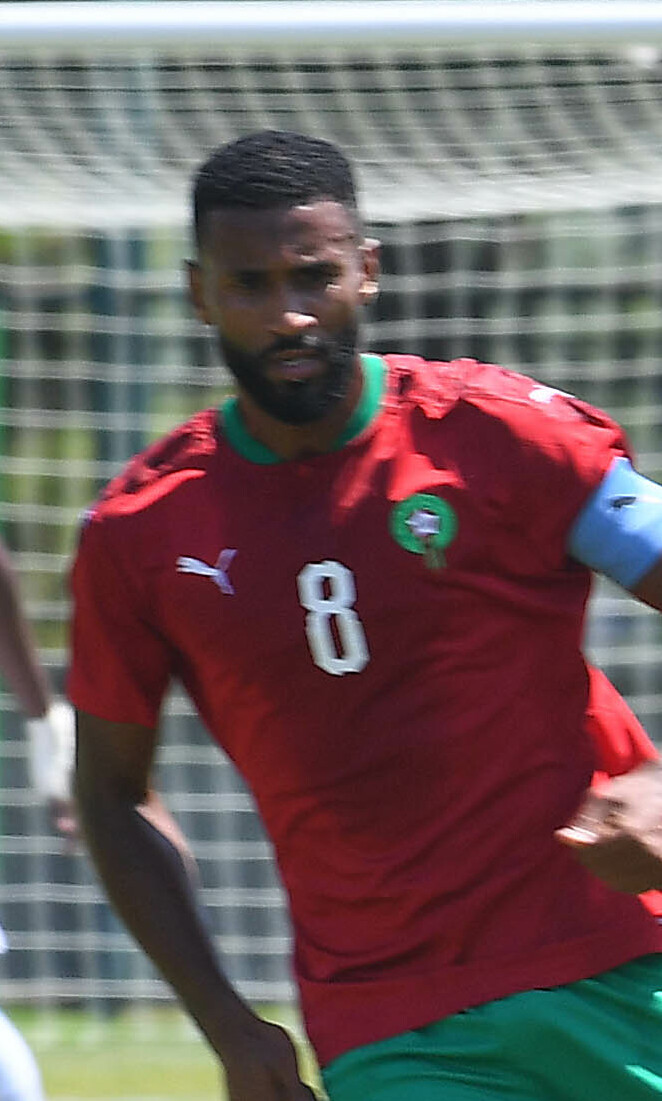

Personal information
- Date of birth: 12 December 1990 (age 35)
- Place of birth: Salé, Morocco
- Height: 1.88 m (6 ft 2 in)
- Position: Midfielder

Team information
- Current team: AS FAR

Senior career*
Years	Team	Apps	(Gls)
2010–2012	Union de Touarga		
2012–2022	RS Berkane	186	(7)
2013	→ AS Salé (loan)		
2024–	CODM	0	(0)

International career
2019–2021	Morocco	6	(0)
- * Club domestic league appearances and goals

Larbi Naji (Arabic: العربي ناجي; 12 December 1990) is a Moroccan professional footballer, who plays as a midfielder for AS FAR in Botola.

== Honours ==
- Moroccan Throne Cup: 2018
- CAF Confederation Cup: 2020
