= Richard Ofori (goalkeeper) =

Ghanaian footballer (born 1993)

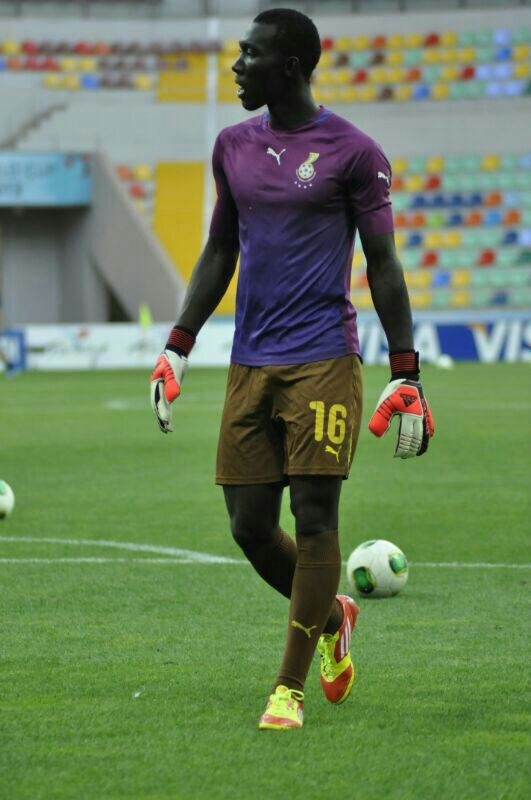

Personal information
- Full name: Richard Ofori
- Date of birth: 1 November 1993 (age 33)
- Place of birth: Accra, Ghana
- Height: 1.90 m (6 ft 3 in)
- Position: Goalkeeper

Team information
- Current team: AmaZulu
- Number: 31

Senior career*
Years	Team	Apps	(Gls)
2012–2017	Wa All-Stars	37	(0)
2018–2020	Maritzburg United	85	(0)
2020–2024	Orlando Pirates	35	(0)
2024–	AmaZulu	23	(0)

International career^{‡}
2013	Ghana U20	4	(0)
2015	Ghana U23		
2015–	Ghana	33	(0)
- * Club domestic league appearances and goals as of 4 January 2026 ‡ National team caps and goals as of 10 December 2022

Richard Ofori (born 1 November 1993) is a Ghanaian professional footballer who play for AmaZulu FC of the South African Premier Division and the Ghana national football team as a goalkeeper.

== Club career ==
=== Ghana ===
Ofori spent a number of seasons with Westland FC (a second-division club in Accra) before he joined Wa Allstars of Wa, Ghana. He had continuously been linked with moves to South Africa or Europe after his highly praised performances in the Ghanaian Premier League, and went on trial with Cape Town City in late 2016. He was voted the best goalkeeper in the 2015 season and was instrumental in the All-Stars' clinching of their first-ever title in 2016, again being voted the best goalkeeper.

=== Maritzburg United ===
Ofori moved to Premier Soccer League club Maritzburg United on a three-year contract in 2018.

=== Orlando Pirates ===
On 20 October 2020, Ofori signed a three-year contract with Orlando Pirates. He played in the Orlando Pirates matches in the MTN 8 tournament. He started in goal in the final match as the Pirates won the trophy and ended their six-year trophy drought. They beat Bloemfontein Celtic 2–1 to win the trophy.

=== AmaZulu FC ===
On 23 September 2024, Ofori joins AmaZulu FC as a free agent.

== International career ==
Ofori played at the 2013 FIFA U-20 World Cup, making one appearance in the third place match, keeping a clean sheet against Iraq. He later appeared for the Ghana U23, playing at the 2015 African Games.

He was first called up to the senior national team for the 2016 African Nations Championship qualification, where he played both legs against the Ivory Coast. He was later called up by head coach Avram Grant for the 2017 Africa Cup of Nations. He is the second deputy captain of the Ghana national football team.

== Career statistics ==
=== International ===
As of matches played 15 July 2019.

National team	Year	Apps	Goals
Ghana	2015	2	0
Ghana	2016	0	0
Ghana	2017	9	0
Ghana	2018	3	0
Ghana	2019	5	0
Total		19	0

== Honours ==
Wa All Stars

- Ghanaian Premier League: 2016
- Ghana Super Cup: 2017

Orlando Pirates

- MTN 8: 2020, 2022, 2023
