= Bandile Shandu =

South African footballer (born 1995)

Personal information
- Date of birth: 19 January 1995 (age 31)
- Place of birth: Pietermaritzburg, South Africa
- Position: Midfielder

Team information
- Current team: Orlando Pirates
- Number: 26

Youth career
- –2013: Maritzburg United

Senior career*
Years	Team	Apps	(Gls)
2013–2021	Maritzburg United	134	(4)
2021–	Orlando Pirates	75	(6)

International career^{‡}
- South Africa U20
- * Club domestic league appearances and goals as of 3 January 2026 ‡ National team caps and goals as of 23:10, 4 October 2020 (UTC)

Bandile Shandu (born 19 January 1995) is a South African professional soccer player who plays as a midfielder for the South African Premier Division club Orlando Pirates. He was born in Pietermaritzburg South Africa, and made his professional debut playing for Maritzburg United at the age of seventeen, while attending the high school Maritzburg College.

== Club career ==
Shandu was first called up to a matchday squad for Maritzburg United in December 2012 - at the age of 17 whilst attending Maritzburg College. He made his professional debut in February 2013 against AmaZulu. The match ended in a 0 – 0 draw. He left the club at the end of his contract on the 30th of June, 2021.

In July 2021, Shandu joined Orlando Pirates on a three-year contract.

== International career ==
He has represented South Africa at the under-20 level.
