= Kabelo Dlamini =

South African soccer player

Personal information
- Date of birth: 16 May 1996 (age 30)
- Place of birth: Daveyton, South Africa
- Height: 1.75 m (5 ft 9 in)
- Positions: Attacking midfielder; right winger

Team information
- Current team: Orlando Pirates
- Number: 18

Youth career
- Stars of Africa

Senior career*
Years	Team	Apps	(Gls)
2017–2019	Bloemfontein Celtic	39	(6)
2019–	Orlando Pirates	124	(10)

International career^{‡}
2025–	South Africa B	5	(1)
- * Club domestic league appearances and goals as of 3 January 2026 ‡ National team caps and goals as of 16 June 1016

Kabelo Dlamini (born 16 May 1996) is a South African soccer player who plays as an attacking midfielder or right winger for South African Premiership side Orlando Pirates.

== Early life ==
Dlamini is from Daveyton. He has said he was playing football on the streets of Daveyton when he was discovered by Jabu Mahlangu and brought to Farouk Khan, the coach of the Stars of Africa football academy. He remained with Stars of Africa for three years, before joining Bloemfontein Celtic.

== Club career ==
Dlamini played for Bloemfontein Celtic from 2017 to 2019. Dlamini joined Orlando Pirates in 2019.

== International career ==
Dlamini was called up to the South Africa national soccer B team for the 2025 COSAFA Cup. He scored one goal in the tournament in a group stage match against Zimbabwe, in what was the first win by South Africa in the history of the tournament between the two sides.
