= Happy Jele =

South African footballer (born 1987)

Personal information
- Full name: Happy Quinton Jele
- Date of birth: 1 January 1987 (age 39)
- Place of birth: Middelburg, South Africa
- Height: 1.82 m (6 ft 0 in)
- Position: Defender

Youth career
- Columbus FC (South Africa)
- Thushaganang Swallows
- Walter Stars

Senior career*
Years	Team	Apps	(Gls)
2006–2022	Orlando Pirates	400	(29)
2022-2023	Royal AM	12	(2)

International career^{‡}
2011–2013	South Africa	3	(0)
- * Club domestic league appearances and goals as of 5 August 2019 ‡ National team caps and goals as of 3 April 2016

Happy Quinton Jele (born 1 January 1987) is a South African association football player who played as a defender and captained the Orlando Pirates FC in the South African Premier Division. Mostly regarded as a club legend for the Soweto based giants, Jele holds the record for having the most appearances for Orlando Pirates.

== Honours ==
=== Domestic competitions ===
South African League titles :

- Premier Soccer League : 2010–11, 2011–12

=== Cup competitions ===
- Nedbank Cup: 2011, 2014
- Telkom Knockout :

2011

- MTN 8 : 2011, 2020
