= List of football clubs in Eswatini =

The following is a list of association football clubs based in Eswatini.

== Hhohho ==
- Malanti Chiefs F.C.
- Mbabane Highlanders F.C.
- Mbabane Swallows F.C.
- Midas Mbabane City F.C.
- Umbelebele Jomo Cosmos F.C.
- Vovovo FC
- Young Buffaloes F.C.

== Lubombo ==
- Eleven Men in Flight F.C.
- Green Mamba FC
- Mhlume United F.C.
- Red Rhinos FC
- Royal Leopards F.C.
- RSSC United F.C.
- Tambankulu Callies FC
- Ubombo Sugar F.C.

== Manzini ==
- Denver Sundowns F.C.
- Green Mamba F.C.
- Manzini Sea Birds F.C.
- Manzini Sundowns F.C.
- Manzini Wanderers F.C.
- Mhlambanyatsi Rovers F.C.
- Moneni Pirates F.C.

== Shiselweni ==
- Nsingizini Hotspurs F.C.
