= List of foreign football players in Eswatini =

== Benin ==
- Nana Nafihou - Mbabane Swallows F.C.
- King Vincent Oyowe - Mbabane Swallows F.C. - 2010

== Cameroon ==
- Eric Bisser - Mbabane Swallows F.C.
- Jocial Tchakounte - Mbabane Swallows F.C.
- Leonardo Bongso - Manzini Sundowns F.C.
- Etienneh Massoye

== Congo ==
- Yannick Ockoly

== Democratic Republic of the Congo ==
- Papy Kabamba Tshishimbi - Mbabane Swallows F.C.
- Sam Mbaya Katala - Mbabane Highlanders F.C.
- Mydo Kingu Yallet - Mbabane Swallows F.C.

== Gabon ==
- Thibault Tchicaya - Mbabane Swallows F.C. - 2009

== Ghana ==
- Kwame Attram - Pigg's Peak Black Swallows F.C. - 2012
- Barnes Mensah - Mbabane Swallows F.C., Manzini Wanderers F.C.
- Bernard Teye - Umbelebele Jomo Cosmos F.C.
- Alex Tagbor - Mbabane Swallows F.C.
- Mohammed Anas - Manzini Wanderers F.C., Mbabane Swallows F.C.
- Ahmed Mohideen - Mbabane Swallows F.C.
- Christian Kassim - Mbabane Swallows F.C. - 2014
- Michael Asamoah - Manzini Wanderers F.C.
- Prince Bonney - Manzini Wanderers F.C. - 2008

== Malawi ==
- Elias Tsabalaka
- Diverson Mlozi - Malanti Chiefs F.C.
- Gomezgani Gondwe
- Kinnah Phiri - Manzini Wanderers F.C. - 1982–84

== Mali ==
- Souleymane Diabate - Umbelebele Jomo Cosmos F.C.
- Cheick Cissé - Mbabane Highlanders F.C., Mbabane Swallows F.C.

== Mozambique ==
- Eduardo Tamele

== Nigeria ==
- Sunday Ogana
- Goodwill "Emeka" Ogbonna
- Ifeanyi Ezewudo
- Daniel Okoye - Mbabane Swallows F.C. - 2014
- Jimoh Moses - Mbabane Swallows F.C., Mbabane Highlanders F.C., Matsapha United FC
- Olayeni Fashina - Mbabane Swallows F.C., Malanti Chiefs F.C.
- Atilola Abdulsalam Tunde - Manzini Sundowns F.C.
- Solomon Oladele - Green Mamba F.C., Red Lions FC
- Stanley Umukoro - Mbabane Swallows F.C.

== Senegal ==
- Mohammed Ndiaye (spelled Ndiyiaye) - Mbabane Highlanders F.C.

== South Africa ==
- Sphamandla Mathenjwa - Mbabane Swallows F.C.
- Thabiso Maharala - Mbabane Swallows F.C. - 2014
- Thabo Tshulungwane - Manzini Wanderers F.C.
- Lucky Mhlathe - Manzini Wanderers F.C. - 2013
- Vusi Madinane - Malanti Chiefs F.C., Royal Leopards F.C.
- Benedict Vilakazi - Malanti Chiefs F.C. - 2013
- Dumisani Kunene (Manzini Wanderers)
- Jabulani Matu (Manzini Sundowns)
- Tebogo Motale (Malanti Chiefs)
- Sihle Ndaba (Malanti Chiefs)
- Myron Shongwe (RSSC United)
- Banele Ndzabandzaba - Matsapha United
- Collen Zimba - Matsapha United
- Ayanda Lumkwane
- Lazola Kunene - Mbabane Swallows F.C.
- Brian Ngwenya - Malanti Chiefs F.C.

== Zambia ==
- Jani Simulambo - Mbabane Highlanders F.C. - 1983–89
- Satali Mulife - Mbabane Highlanders F.C., Royal Leopards F.C.

== Zimbabwe ==
- (Eswatini) Ricky Sibiya
- Alois Ngwerume - Mbabane Swallows F.C. - 2014–15
- Talent Maposa - Mbabane Swallows F.C.
- Jim Knowledge - Mbabane Swallows F.C., Red Lions FC - 2014, 2017-
- Kudzanayi 'Vibes' Matanda - Mbabane Swallows F.C.
- Ephraim Mazarura - Mbabane Swallows F.C.
- Stanford Ncube - Mbabane Highlanders F.C., Mbabane Swallows F.C., Manzini Wanderers F.C.
- Size Phiri - Manzini Wanderers F.C.
- Cedric Gulwa - Manzini Wanderers F.C., Mbabane Highlanders F.C.
- Hloniphani Ndebele - Manzini Wanderers F.C., Mbabane Highlanders F.C., RSSC United F.C., Manzini Wanderers F.C., Midas Mbabane City F.C. - 2015, 2015, 2016–17
- Golding Dube
- Zondig Nyaungwa - Mbabane Swallows F.C., Mbabane Highlanders F.C.
- Gilbert Mushangazhike - Manzini Sundowns F.C. - 2010-12
- Pride Zendera
