= 2021–22 Premier League of Eswatini =

Premier League of Eswatini
- Season: 2021–22
- Champions: Royal Leopards
- Relegated: Rangers, Milling Hotspurs, Tinyosi, Malanti Chiefs
- Matches: 240
- Goals: 653 (2.72 per match)
- Top goalscorer: Sandile Gamedze (26 goals)

The 2021–22 Premier League of Eswatini was the season of the Premier League of Eswatini, the top-tier football league in Eswatini (formerly Swaziland), that started in November 2021.

== Teams ==
The 2019–20 season was abandoned with no teams relegated, so the 2020–21 season began with 16 instead of 14 teams. For this season, 4 teams were due to be relegated, in order to return the number to 14 for the following season. However, the Premier League of Eswatini challenged the Eswatini Football Association decision, and two of the four relegated teams challenged the decision.

== League table ==
Pos	Team	Pld	W	D	L	GF	GA	GD	Pts	Qualification or relegation
1	Royal Leopards	30	21	6	3	72	19	+53	69	Qualification for Champions League
2	Mbabane Highlanders	30	20	7	3	64	25	+39	67	Qualification for Confederation Cup
3	Mbabane Swallows	30	20	5	5	51	22	+29	65	
4	Young Buffaloes	30	19	7	4	71	21	+50	64	
5	Tambankulu Callies	30	12	8	10	37	37	0	44	
6	Manzini Wanderers	30	10	10	10	44	41	+3	40	
7	Vovovo FC	30	9	11	10	41	42	−1	38	
8	Manzini Sea Birds	30	11	5	14	45	44	+1	38	
9	Green Mamba	30	9	10	11	38	46	−8	37	
10	Moneni Pirates	30	9	8	13	31	46	−15	35	
11	Denver Sundowns	30	10	4	16	28	38	−10	34	
12	Tambuti	30	8	6	16	32	62	−30	30	
13	Milling Hotspurs	30	6	11	13	25	43	−18	29	Relegation to Eswatini First Division
14	Rangers FC	30	7	6	17	24	54	−30	27	Relegation to Eswatini First Division
15	Tinyosi	30	5	8	17	21	48	−27	23	Relegation to Eswatini First Division
16	Malanti Chiefs	30	5	6	19	29	65	−36	21	Relegation to Eswatini First Division

Updated to match(es) played on 5 June 2022. Source: rsssf.com
Rules for classification: 1) points; 2) head-to-head points; 3) head-to-head goal difference; 4) head-to-head goals scored; 5) goal difference; 6) goals scored; 7) playoff.

== Stadiums ==
Team	Location	Stadium	Capacity
Denver Sundowns F.C.	Manzini	Mavuso Sports Centre	5,000
Green Mamba F.C.			
Malanti Chiefs F.C.			
Mbabane Highlanders F.C.	Ezulwini	Casino Stadium	2,000
Mbabane Swallows F.C.	Lobamba	Somhlolo National Stadium	20,000
Manzini Sea Birds F.C.	Manzini	Mavuso Sports Centre	5,000
Manzini Wanderers F.C.	Manzini	Mavuso Sports Centre	5,000
Milling Hotspurs F.C.			
Moneni Pirates F.C.	Manzini	Mavuso Stadium	8,000
Rangers			
Royal Leopards F.C.	Simunye	Simunye Park	5,000
Tambuti F.C.			
Tambankulu Callies FC			
Tinyosi F.C.			
Vovovo			
Young Buffaloes F.C.	Manzini	Mavuso Sports Centre	5,000
