= 2013–14 Swazi Premier League =

Swazi Premier League
- Season: 2013–14
- Champions: Royal Leopards

The 2013–14 Swazi Premier League season was the 2013–14 season of the top level of football competition in Swaziland. It concluded on 10 May 2014.

== Standings ==
Pos	Team	Pld	W	D	L	GF	GA	GD	Pts	Qualification or relegation
1	Royal Leopards	22	13	7	2	39	20	+19	46	Champions
2	Mbabane Swallows	22	12	7	3	46	19	+27	43	
3	Manzini Wanderers	22	11	6	5	31	20	+11	39	
4	Young Buffaloes	22	10	5	7	28	21	+7	35	
5	Green Mamba FC	22	9	7	6	26	17	+9	34	
6	Manzini Sundowns	22	9	6	7	27	20	+7	33	
7	Malanti Chiefs	22	8	7	7	34	32	+2	31	
8	RSSC United	22	8	4	10	21	31	−10	28	
9	Moneni Pirates	22	4	9	9	24	31	−7	21	
10	Manzini Sea Birds	22	6	3	13	24	42	−18	21	
11	Umbelebele Jomo Cosmos	22	5	1	16	14	42	−28	16	Relegated
12	Midas City	22	2	8	12	17	36	−19	14	Relegated
