= 2014–15 Swazi Premier League =

Swazi Premier League
- Season: 2014–15
- Champions: Royal Leopards

The 2014–15 Swazi Premier League season was the 2014–15 season of the top level of football competition in Swaziland. It began on 23 August 2014 and concluded on 10 May 2015.

== Standings ==
Pos	Team	Pld	W	D	L	GF	GA	GD	Pts	Qualification or relegation
1	Royal Leopards	22	16	5	1	52	16	+36	53	Champions
2	Mbabane Swallows	22	13	3	6	41	25	+16	42	
3	Young Buffaloes	22	10	7	5	32	23	+9	37	
4	Green Mamba FC	22	10	6	6	38	27	+11	36	
5	Mbabane Highlanders	22	10	5	7	36	35	+1	35	
6	Manzini Sundowns	22	8	7	7	16	14	+2	31	
7	Red Lions	22	7	7	8	32	40	−8	28	
8	Malanti Chiefs	22	8	3	11	33	33	0	27	
9	Manzini Sea Birds	22	8	1	13	24	42	−18	25	
10	Manzini Wanderers	22	5	8	9	25	28	−3	23	
11	Moneni Pirates	22	5	7	10	22	32	−10	22	Relegated
12	RSSC United	22	1	3	18	15	51	−36	6	Relegated
