= 2019–20 Premier League of Eswatini =

Premier League of Eswatini
- Season: 2019–20
- Champions: Young Buffaloes
- Champions League: Young Buffaloes
- Confederation Cup: Mbabane Swallows

The 2019–20 Premier League of Eswatini was the 2019–20 season of the Premier League of Eswatini, the top-tier football league in Eswatini (formerly Swaziland), since its establishment in 1971. The season started on 17 August 2019 and Round 18 was completed on 1 March 2020 before being suspended due to the COVID-19 pandemic in Eswatini. In August 2020, the Eswatini Football Association decided to abandon the season, with winners and promotion being decided by the log positions at the time of the suspension, and with no relegations.

== League table ==
Pos	Team	Pld	W	D	L	GF	GA	GD	Pts	Qualification or relegation
1	Young Buffaloes (C)	18	14	3	1	48	11	+37	45	Qualification for Champions League
2	Mbabane Swallows (Q)	18	10	7	1	28	7	+21	37	Qualification for Confederation Cup
3	Royal Leopards	18	10	5	3	25	11	+14	35	
4	Moneni Pirates	18	9	4	5	25	17	+8	31	
5	Green Mamba	18	8	4	6	26	16	+10	28	
6	Denver Sundowns	18	6	7	5	19	20	−1	25	
7	Mbabane Highlanders	17	4	10	3	12	13	−1	22	
8	Milling Hotspurs	18	4	7	7	13	22	−9	19	
9	Tambuti	18	4	9	5	22	29	−7	21	
10	Manzini Sea Birds	17	4	5	8	19	29	−10	17	
11	Manzini Wanderers	18	4	5	9	19	32	−13	17	
12	Malanti Chiefs	17	5	0	12	13	26	−13	15	
13	Mhlume Peacemakers	18	3	5	10	14	29	−15	14	
14	Black Swallows	18	3	2	13	19	40	−21	11	

Source: RSSSF
Rules for classification: 1) points; 2) head-to-head points; 3) head-to-head goal difference; 4) head-to-head goals scored; 5) goal difference; 6) goals scored; 7) playoff.
(C) Champions; (Q) Qualified for the phase indicated
