= 2012–13 Swazi Premier League =

Swazi Premier League
- Season: 2012–13
- Champions: Mbabane Swallows

The 2012–13 Swazi Premier League season was the 2012–13 season of the top level of football competition in Swaziland. It began on 17 August 2021 and concluded on 12 May 2013.

== Standings ==
Pos	Team	Pld	W	D	L	GF	GA	GD	Pts	Qualification or relegation
1	Mbabane Swallows	22	15	3	4	54	28	+26	48	Qualification for Champions League
2	Malanti Chiefs	22	10	7	5	42	33	+9	37	
3	Green Mamba	22	10	6	6	37	26	+11	36	
4	Moneni Pirates	22	9	8	5	26	20	+6	35	
5	Young Buffaloes	22	8	10	4	31	26	+5	34	
6	Manzini Sundowns	22	6	10	6	28	25	+3	28	
7	Manzini Wanderers	22	7	7	8	22	25	−3	28	
8	Royal Leopards	22	6	9	7	22	25	−3	27	
9	Midas City	22	6	6	10	19	28	−9	24	
10	Manzini Sea Birds	22	6	6	10	29	39	−10	24	
11	Mbabane Highlanders	22	3	10	9	28	35	−7	19	Relegated
12	Red Lions	22	3	4	15	17	45	−28	13	Relegated
