= 2022–23 Premier League of Eswatini =

Premier League of Eswatini
- Season: 2022–23
- Champions: Green Mamba

The 2022–23 Premier League of Eswatini was the 2022–23 season of the Premier League of Eswatini, the top-tier football league in Eswatini It was won by Green Mamba.

== Season ==
With four teams having been relegated the previous season, and only two promoted, the league was reduced from 16 to 14 teams. In addition, Nsingizini Hotspurs purchased the status of Vovovo.

The league faced numerous logistical difficulties, in particular ambulances, with a player being taken to hospital by private car in one incident, and in another, fans being required to push an ambulance that was attempting to take an injured player to hospital.

== League table ==
Pos	Team	Pld	W	D	L	GF	GA	GD	Pts	Qualification or relegation
1	Green Mamba	26	20	1	5	50	22	+28	61	Qualification for Champions League
2	Young Buffaloes	26	16	10	0	49	18	+31	58	Qualification for Confederation Cup
3	Mbabane Swallows	26	16	6	4	53	19	+34	54	
4	Mbabane Highlanders	26	15	6	5	33	17	+16	51	
5	Royal Leopards	26	11	6	9	37	28	+9	39	
6	Nsingizini Hotspurs	26	10	8	8	32	24	+8	38	
7	Moneni Pirates	26	9	7	10	21	28	−7	34	
8	Denver Sundowns	26	8	8	10	28	25	+3	32	
9	Manzini Sea Birds	26	6	10	10	36	39	−3	28	
10	Manzini Wanderers	26	8	3	15	22	42	−20	27	
11	Madlenya	26	7	4	15	28	36	−8	25	
12	Tambuti	26	6	5	15	22	43	−21	23	
13	Seven Dreams	26	2	9	15	15	34	−19	15	Relegation to Eswatini First Division
14	Tambankulu Callies	26	2	9	15	13	42	−29	15	Relegation to Eswatini First Division

Source: rsssf.com
Rules for classification: 1) points; 2) head-to-head points; 3) head-to-head goal difference; 4) head-to-head goals scored; 5) goal difference; 6) goals scored; 7) playoff.
