= 2018–19 Premier League of Eswatini =

Premier League of Eswatini
- Season: 2018–19

The 2018–19 Premier League of Eswatini was the 2018–19 season of the Premier League of Eswatini, the top-tier football league in Eswatini (formerly Swaziland), since its establishment in 1971. The season started on 14 September 2018.

== League table ==
| Pos | Team | Pld | W | D | L | GF | GA | GD | Pts | Qualification or relegation |
|---|---|---|---|---|---|---|---|---|---|---|
| 1 | Green Mamba (C) | 26 | 18 | 4 | 4 | 45 | 12 | +33 | 58 (Note: Head-to-head Pts (GF–GA): Green Mamba 3 (2–1), Royal Leopards 3 (1–2).) | Qualification for Champions League |
| 2 | Royal Leopards | 26 | 18 | 4 | 4 | 43 | 13 | +30 | 58 | |
| 3 | Young Buffaloes (Q) | 26 | 13 | 9 | 4 | 39 | 19 | +20 | 48 | Qualification for Confederation Cup (Note: Young Buffaloes are Eswatini Cup winners.) |
| 4 | Mbabane Swallows | 26 | 13 | 7 | 6 | 32 | 19 | +13 | 46 | |
| 5 | Mbabane Highlanders | 26 | 12 | 8 | 6 | 31 | 20 | +11 | 44 | |
| 6 | Manzini Sea Birds | 26 | 10 | 4 | 12 | 34 | 34 | 0 | 34 | |
| 7 | Matsapha United | 26 | 8 | 6 | 12 | 29 | 34 | −5 | 30 | |
| 8 | Malanti Chiefs | 26 | 6 | 11 | 9 | 24 | 29 | −5 | 29 | |
| 9 | Manzini Sundowns | 26 | 6 | 9 | 11 | 17 | 34 | −17 | 27 (Note: Head-to-head Pts (GF–GA): Manzini Sundowns 7 (3–3), Moneni Pirates 5 (2–2), Manzini Wanderers 4 (4–4).) | |
| 10 | Moneni Pirates | 26 | 6 | 9 | 11 | 23 | 34 | −11 | 27 | |
| 11 | Manzini Wanderers | 26 | 7 | 6 | 13 | 23 | 34 | −11 | 27 | |
| 12 | Tambuti | 26 | 6 | 8 | 12 | 20 | 30 | −10 | 26 | |
| 13 | Vovovo | 26 | 4 | 10 | 12 | 16 | 31 | −15 | 22 | Relegation |
| 14 | Mbabane Citizens | 26 | 2 | 11 | 13 | 17 | 50 | −33 | 17 | Relegation |

Source: Soccerway
Rules for classification: 1) points; 2) head-to-head points; 3) head-to-head goal difference; 4) head-to-head goals scored; 5) goal difference; 6) goals scored; 7) playoff.
(C) Champions; (Q) Qualified for the phase indicated
