= 2020–21 Premier League of Eswatini =

Premier League of Eswatini
- Season: 2020–21
- Champions: Royal Leopards
- Relegated: Black Swallows, Mhlume Peacemakers
- Matches: 240
- Goals: 568 (2.37 per match)

The 2020–21 Premier League of Eswatini is the 43rd season of the Premier League of Eswatini, the top-tier football league in Eswatini (formerly Swaziland), since its establishment in 1971. The season started late on 12 December 2020 due to the COVID-19 pandemic in Eswatini.

== Teams ==
The previous season was abandoned with no teams relegated, so the season began with 16 instead of 14 teams, after the addition of the two promoted teams, Tinyosi and Tambankulu Callies.

== League table ==
Pos	Team	Pld	W	D	L	GF	GA	GD	Pts	Qualification or relegation
1	Royal Leopards	30	24	5	1	62	18	+44	77	Qualification for Champions League
2	Young Buffaloes	30	22	6	2	58	14	+44	72	Qualification for Confederation Cup
3	Mbabane Swallows	30	21	6	3	54	19	+35	69	
4	Green Mamba	30	14	8	8	34	26	+8	50	
5	Mbabane Highlanders	30	13	11	6	41	24	+17	50	
6	Manzini Wanderers	30	12	11	7	31	25	+6	47	
7	Milling Hotspurs	30	10	7	13	33	42	−9	37	
8	Manzini Sea Birds	30	8	11	11	31	36	−5	35	
9	Tinyosi	30	8	7	15	29	41	−12	31	
10	Tambuti	30	6	12	12	30	41	−11	30	
11	Denver Sundowns	30	7	8	15	33	41	−8	29	
12	Tambankulu Callies	30	7	7	16	29	37	−8	28	
13	Moneni Pirates	30	7	7	16	25	43	−18	28	
14	Malanti Chiefs	30	7	7	16	25	42	−17	28	
15	Black Swallows	30	6	7	17	31	58	−27	25	Relegation to Eswatini First Division
16	Mhlume Peacemakers	30	5	6	19	22	61	−39	21	Relegation to Eswatini First Division

Updated to match(es) played on 11 August 2021. Source: rsssf.com
Rules for classification: 1) points; 2) head-to-head points; 3) head-to-head goal difference; 4) head-to-head goals scored; 5) goal difference; 6) goals scored; 7) playoff.

== Stadiums ==
Team	Location	Stadium	Capacity
Royal Leopards F.C.	Simunye	Simunye Park	5,000
Young Buffaloes F.C.	Manzini	Mavuso Sports Centre	5,000
Mbabane Swallows F.C.	Lobamba	Somhlolo National Stadium	20,000
Green Mamba F.C.			
Mbabane Highlanders F.C.	Ezulwini	Casino Stadium	2,000
Manzini Wanderers F.C.	Manzini	Mavuso Sports Centre	5,000
Milling Hotspurs F.C.			
Manzini Sea Birds F.C.	Manzini	Mavuso Sports Centre	5,000
Tinyosi FC			
Tambuti F.C.			
Denver Sundowns F.C.	Manzini	Mavuso Sports Centre	5,000
Tambankulu Callies FC			
Moneni Pirates F.C.	Manzini	Mavuso Stadium	8,000
Malanti Chiefs F.C.			
Black Swallows F.C.			
Mhlume Peacemakers F.C.			
