= 2017–18 Swazi Premier League =

Swazi Premier League
- Season: 2017–18
- Champions: Mbabane Swallows

The 2017–18 Swazi Premier League season was the 2017–18 season of the top level of football competition in Swaziland (since 2018 renamed to Eswatini). It began on 8 September 2017 and ended on 13 May 2018.

== Standings ==
Final table.

Pos	Team	Pld	W	D	L	GF	GA	GD	Pts
1	Mbabane Swallows (Q)	26	17	9	0	47	14	+33	60
2	Young Buffaloes	26	17	7	2	45	13	+32	58
3	Green Mamba FC	26	15	5	6	45	24	+21	50
4	Manzini Wanderers	26	12	6	8	34	30	+4	42
5	Mbabane Highlanders	26	11	7	8	37	27	+10	40
6	Malanti Chiefs	26	11	5	10	35	42	−7	38
7	Royal Leopards	26	9	10	7	33	21	+12	37
8	Manzini Sundowns	26	8	11	7	31	24	+7	35
9	Matsapha United	26	8	11	7	26	26	0	35
10	Moneni Pirates	26	6	11	9	24	33	−9	29
11	Tambuti	26	7	6	13	26	36	−10	27
12	Vovovo	26	7	3	16	24	45	−21	24
13	Red Lions (R)	25	3	4	18	20	47	−27	13
14	Mbabane Midas City (R)	26	2	2	22	15	60	−45	8

Updated to match(es) played on unknown. Source:
(Q) Qualified for the phase indicated; (R) Relegated

== See also ==
- 2018 Swazi Cup
