= 2015–16 Swazi Premier League =

Swazi Premier League
- Season: 2015–16
- Champions: Royal Leopards

The 2015–16 Swazi Premier League season was the 2015–16 season of the top level of football competition in Swaziland. It began on 22 August 2015 and concluded on 15 May 2016.

== Standings ==
Pos	Team	Pld	W	D	L	GF	GA	GD	Pts	Qualification or relegation
1	Royal Leopards	22	13	7	2	34	17	+17	46	Champions
2	Mbabane Highlanders	22	14	3	5	34	19	+15	45	
3	Young Buffaloes	22	12	6	4	35	16	+19	42	
4	Mbabane Swallows	22	10	7	5	48	22	+26	37	
5	Mbabane Midas City	22	10	4	8	23	21	+2	34	
6	Green Mamba FC (Matsapha)	22	7	9	6	35	26	+9	30	
7	Manzini Wanderers	22	6	7	9	21	32	−11	25	
8	Manzini Sundowns	22	6	6	10	18	23	−5	24	
9	Red Lions	22	6	6	10	19	37	−18	24	
10	Manzini Sea Birds	22	5	6	11	22	38	−16	21	
11	Bad Boys (Fairview)	22	4	7	11	21	36	−15	19	Relegated
12	Malanti Chiefs (Pigg's Peak)	22	2	6	14	17	40	−23	12	Relegated
