= 2011–12 Swazi Premier League =

Swazi Premier League
- Season: 2011–12
- Champions: Mbabane Swallows

The 2011–12 Swazi Premier League season was the 2011–12 season of the top level of football competition in Swaziland.

== Standings ==
Pos	Team	Pld	W	D	L	GF	GA	GD	Pts	Qualification or relegation
1	Mbabane Swallows	22	15	2	5	46	27	+19	47	Qualification for Champions League
2	Royal Leopards	22	14	3	5	48	19	+29	45	
3	Manzini Sundowns	22	13	2	7	34	22	+12	41	
4	Mbabane Highlanders	22	12	4	6	29	21	+8	40	
5	Manzini Wanderers	22	11	5	6	33	20	+13	38	
6	Malanti Chiefs	22	10	6	6	47	35	+12	36	
7	Moneni Pirates	22	11	2	9	22	19	+3	35	
8	Green Mamba	22	10	4	8	29	27	+2	34	
9	Young Buffaloes	22	4	9	9	22	33	−11	21	
10	Red Lions	22	3	5	14	24	51	−27	14	
11	Tambankulu Callies	22	3	3	16	14	44	−30	12	Relegated
12	Hellenic	22	1	5	16	15	45	−30	8	Relegated
