= 2016–17 Swazi Premier League =

Swazi Premier League
- Season: 2016–17
- Champions: Mbabane Swallows

The 2016–17 Swazi Premier League season was the 2016–17 season of the top level of football competition in Swaziland. It began on 17 September 2016 and concluded on 25 May 2017.

== Standings ==
Pos	Team	Pld	W	D	L	GF	GA	GD	Pts	Qualification
1	Mbabane Swallows	22	19	3	0	58	15	+43	60	Champions
2	Young Buffaloes	22	10	7	5	25	17	+8	37	
3	Royal Leopards	22	11	3	8	29	24	+5	36	
4	Moneni Pirates	22	9	8	5	33	25	+8	35	
5	Manzini Wanderers	22	8	9	5	31	22	+9	33	
6	Manzini Sundowns	22	8	9	5	24	23	+1	33	
7	Green Mamba FC (Matsapha)	22	8	5	9	29	22	+7	29	
8	Mbabane Midas City	22	5	10	7	24	27	−3	25	
9	Tambuti	22	7	3	12	26	38	−12	24	
10	Red Lions	22	6	3	13	24	46	−22	21	
11	Mbabane Highlanders	22	4	7	11	28	38	−10	19	
12	Manzini Sea Birds	22	1	5	16	15	49	−34	8	Relegation Playoff
