= 2024–25 Premier League of Eswatini =

Premier League of Eswatini
- Season: 2024–25
- Champions: Nsingizini Hotspurs (1st title)
- Relegated: Sidvwashini United; Madlenya
- Matches: 182
- Goals: 452 (2.48 per match)
- Biggest home win: Royal Leopards 4-0 Illovo
- Biggest away win: Ezulwini United 0-5 Green Mamba
- Highest scoring: Ezulwini United 0-5 Green Mamba

The 2024–25 Premier League of Eswatini was the 2024–25 season of the Premier League of Eswatini, the top-tier football league in Eswatini The defending champions are Mbabane Swallows.

The season started on 14 September 2024 and concluded in May 2025.

== League table ==
Pos	Team	Pld	W	D	L	GF	GA	GD	Pts	Qualification or relegation
1	Nsingizini Hotspurs (C, Q)	26	19	3	4	44	14	+30	60	Qualification for 2025–26 CAF Champions League
2	Royal Leopards	26	17	8	1	58	17	+41	59	
3	Young Buffaloes	26	17	3	6	39	20	+19	54	
4	Green Mamba	26	15	7	4	44	16	+28	52	
5	Moneni Pirates	26	11	8	7	35	29	+6	41	
6	Mbabane Swallows	26	9	8	9	27	22	+5	35	
7	Illovo	26	9	8	9	31	37	−6	35	
8	Mbabane Highlanders	26	8	9	9	27	30	−3	33	
9	Ezulwini United	26	8	6	12	34	37	−3	30	
10	Manzini Sea Birds	26	7	7	12	29	33	−4	28	
11	Sisonkhe	26	7	2	17	17	47	−30	23	
12	Rangers	26	6	4	16	32	43	−11	22	
13	Sidvwashini United (R)	26	2	10	14	19	53	−34	16	Relegation to National First Division
14	Madlenya (R)	26	3	5	18	16	54	−38	14	Relegation to National First Division

Source: rsssf.com
Rules for classification: 1) points; 2) head-to-head points; 3) head-to-head goal difference; 4) head-to-head goals scored; 5) goal difference; 6) goals scored; 7) playoff.
(C) Champions; (Q) Qualified for the phase indicated; (R) Relegated
