= Leon Manyisa =

Liswati footballer

Personal information
- Full name: Leon Mongi Manyisa
- Date of birth: 3 June 1999 (age 27)
- Place of birth: Lobamba, Eswatini
- Position: Attacking midfielder

Team information
- Current team: Mbabane Swallows
- Number: 11

Senior career*
Years	Team	Apps	(Gls)
2017–	Vovovo		
2019	→ Manzini Wanderers (loan)		
2019	→ Van (loan)	1	(0)
2020–2022	→ Mbabane Swallows (loan)		

International career^{‡}
2018	Eswatini U20	2	(1)
2022–	Eswatini	4	(0)
- * Club domestic league appearances and goals ‡ National team caps and goals as of 16:08, 16 July 2022 (UTC)

Leon Manyisa (born 3 June 1999) is a Liswati footballer who plays for Premier League of Eswatini club Mbabane Swallows and the Eswatini national team.

== Club career ==
As a youth Manyisa was part of the Green Mamba Development Academy. He began his senior career with Vovovo FC of the Premier League of Eswatini. In 2018 he was spotted by a Real Madrid scout in Eswatini. He was invited to a trial with the club's "B" team. After impressing at the first trial, he was invited back but could not attend because of visa issues. In late 2019 it was reported that Manyisa was still a target of the Spanish club.

In Summer 2019 Manyisa's parent club placed a E150 000 price tag on him as it was relegated to the National First Division for the upcoming season. The team's E150,000–200 000 valuation made him one of the most valuable players in the country. By June 2019 Manyisa was reportedly close to signing for a top Malaysia Super League club with only a few details still being finalized.

Ultimately for the 2019/20 season, he moved to Manzini Wanderers of the Eswatini Premier League on a season-long loan from Vovovo after a permanent deal could not be reached with Real Madrid or the Malaysian club. After playing in only the first few matches of the season, Manyisa was signed by FC Van of the Armenian First League in September. On 29 August 2019 the Armenian club triggered a release clause that allowed the player to leave for a club abroad. Despite signing a two-year contract, he returned home two months later. The player claimed contractual commitments were not met by the club while the club claimed the player left because of family issues. The player was also reportedly a victim of racial abuse by some team officials. In total he played in only four matches for Van, tallying an assist against FC Ani in his final appearance. Manyisa was ruled ineligible to play by the Eswatini Football Association for a time until multiple official paperwork issues related to the transfers were sorted.

Manyisa went on trial with Highlands Park F.C. of the South African Premier Division in December 2019. The South African club was reportedly close to signing the player despite interest from high-profile domestic clubs. Despite a successful trial and a desire by Highlands Park to sign the player, the deal could not be finalized because the situation with FC Van and the player's International Transfer Certificate had not yet been resolved.

In early 2020 the EFA ruled that Manyisa could return to play at the beginning of the 2020-21 season. In July 2020 the player attracted interest from Mbabane Highlanders and Manzini Wanderers but joined Mbabane Swallows on a one-year loan from Vovovo for E70 000. The deal reportedly paid Manyisa E7 500 monthly. Four months later he went on trial with Tshakhuma Tsha Madzivhandila F.C., another South African Premier Division club. By the time the 2020–21 season resumed after the COVID-19 pandemic, Manyisa was back playing with Mbabane Swallows.

== International career ==
Manyisa was first involved in with the Eswatini national team program at age 6, at which point he played with the under-13 side. In March 2018 he was part of Eswatini's under-20 squad for a home-and-away series against Malawi in the first round of 2019 Africa U-20 Cup of Nations qualification. He scored his team's only goal in the series in the second leg, but Eswatini was eliminated on the away goals rule.

In November 2019 Manyisa was set to be part of the Eswatini squad for two 2019 Africa U-23 Cup of Nations qualification matches against Mozambique but had to withdraw to attend his trial with Real Madrid.

Manyisa received his first call-up to the senior national team in September 2019 for Eswatini's second-leg 2022 FIFA World Cup qualifier at home against Djibouti. However, he did not go on to feature in the match.

Manyisa was called up again in May 2022 for 2023 Africa Cup of Nations qualification and again in July of that year for the 2022 COSAFA Cup. He made his senior international debut on 6 July in the team's opening match of the latter tournament, coming on as a second-half substitute in a 3–0 victory over Mauritius. Later that month he was included in the roster for a two-leg series against Botswana in 2022 African Nations Championship qualification.

=== International career statistics ===
As of match played 15 July 2022

Eswatini national team
Year	Apps	Goals
2022	4	0
Total	4	0
