= 2023–24 Premier League of Eswatini =

Premier League of Eswatini
- Season: 2023–24
- Champions: Mbabane Swallows

The 2023–24 Premier League of Eswatini was the 2023–24 season of the Premier League of Eswatini, the top-tier football league in Eswatini It was won by Mbabane Swallows, who earned R1 million in prize money.

From this season, the league runners up no longer qualified for the Confederation Cup, with the position instead going to the cup winners. Green Mamba finished second, also winning the cup, which qualified them to the 2024–25 CAF Confederation Cup. However, the club elected not to compete, citing the cost.

== League table ==
Pos	Team	Pld	W	D	L	GF	GA	GD	Pts	Qualification or relegation
1	Mbabane Swallows	26	15	10	1	44	20	+24	55	Qualification for Champions League
2	Green Mamba	26	15	5	6	56	22	+34	50	
3	Nsingizini Hotspurs	26	12	12	2	27	17	+10	48	
4	Young Buffaloes	26	14	4	8	50	26	+24	46	
5	Royal Leopards	26	12	10	4	38	27	+11	46	
6	Mbabane Highlanders	26	10	8	8	36	36	0	38	
7	Illovo	26	8	10	8	23	27	−4	34	
8	Madlenya	26	6	9	11	21	39	−18	27	
9	Rangers	26	6	8	12	24	29	−5	26	
10	Ezulwini United	26	5	10	11	19	28	−9	25	
11	Manzini Sea Birds	26	5	10	11	25	43	−18	25	
12	Moneni Pirates	26	3	13	10	27	34	−7	22	
13	Denver Sundowns	26	5	6	15	18	36	−18	21	Relegation to Eswatini First Division
14	Manzini Wanderers	26	4	9	13	27	51	−24	21	Relegation to Eswatini First Division

Source: rsssf.com
Rules for classification: 1) points; 2) head-to-head points; 3) head-to-head goal difference; 4) head-to-head goals scored; 5) goal difference; 6) goals scored; 7) playoff.
