= Thubelihle Mavuso =

Liswati footballer

Personal information
- Date of birth: 6 October 2001 (age 25)
- Place of birth: Eswatini
- Positions: Midfielder; forward

Team information
- Current team: Nsingizini Hotspurs
- Number: 10

Senior career*
| Years | Team | Apps | (Gls) |
| 2022– | Nsingizini Hotspurs | | |

International career^{‡}
| 2024– | Eswatini | 8 | (1) |
- * Club domestic league appearances and goals ‡ National team caps and goals as of 16:08, 16 July 2022 (UTC)

Thubelihle Mavuso (born 6 October 2001) is a Liswati footballer who plays for Premier League of Eswatini club Nsingizini Hotspurs and the Eswatini national team.

== Club career ==
Mavuso played with Ezulwini United and Mhlume Peacemakers before joining Premier League of Eswatini club Nsingizini Hotspurs in 2022. That year, he was named the Player of the Tournament in the inaugural MoMo Cup and Man of the Match in the tournament final in which Hotspurs earned a 2–1 victory over Moneni Pirates to win the championship. Hotspurs won the competition again in 2023, this time defeating Mbabane Swallows in the final. Mavuso was again named Player of the Match for the game against Swallows and Player of the Tournament.

In March 2023, Mavuso traveled to Italy for a one-month trial with an unnamed club. In May 2024, he was named Nsingizini Hotspurs's Players' Player and Player of the Season Award winner following the 2023–24 Swazi Premier League season. At that time, it was also announced that one of the club's sponsors was to finance a trial to a top unnamed club in Israel for the player.

Later in summer 2024, former Kaizer Chiefs player Humphrey Mlwane urged his former club to sign Mavuso following his impressive performances for Eswatini at the 2024 COSAFA Cup. Soon thereafter, he then competed with Nsingizini Hotspurs in its 2024–25 CAF Confederation Cup matches against Stellenbosch of the South African Premiership.

== International career ==
Mavuso was a member of the national under-20 team as a youth, including at the 2022 COSAFA U-20 Cup. He received a call-up to the senior national team in March 2024 for a pair of 2025 Africa Cup of Nations qualification matches against Somalia. He went on to make his debut on 20 March in the first match of the series. He scored his first senior international goal on 11 October 2024 against Mozambique in the Group Stage of qualification. His late strike from sixteen yards out leveled the score at and helped secure a point for Eswatini.

=== International goals ===
Last updated 11 October 2024.

| No | Date | Venue | Opponent | Score | Result | Competition |
|---|---|---|---|---|---|---|
| 1. | 11 October 2024 | Estádio do Zimpeto, Maputo, Mozambique | Mozambique | 1–1 | 1–1 | 2025 Africa Cup of Nations qualification |
Last updated 11 October 2024

=== International career statistics ===
As of match played 11 October 2024

Eswatini national team
| Year | Apps | Goals |
|---|---|---|
| 2024 | 8 | 1 |
| Total | 8 | 1 |
