= Sabelo Ndzinisa =

Swazi association football player

Sabelo Sikhali Ndzinisa
Personal information
- Full name: Sabelo Sikhali Ndzinisa
- Date of birth: 31 July 1991 (age 35)
- Place of birth: Ntshanini, Swaziland
- Height: 1.70 m (5 ft 7 in)
- Position: Striker

Team information
- Current team: Green Mamba
- Number: 11

Senior career*
Years	Team	Apps	(Gls)
2012–2019	Mbabane Swallows		(24)
2019–2020	Mbombela United	20	(1)
2020–2023	Mbabane Highlanders		(51)
2024–	Green Mamba		(38)

International career^{‡}
2012–	Eswatini	78	(17)
- * Club domestic league appearances and goals ‡ National team caps and goals as of 31 July 2026

Sabelo Sikhali Ndzinisa (born 31 July 1991) is a Liswati footballer who plays for Green Mamba of the Premier League of Eswatini, and is the all time top goalscorer for the Eswatini national team.

== International career ==
Ndzinisa made his senior international debut on 11 November 2012 in a friendly draw with Lesotho.

== Club career ==
Ndzinisa was the top scorer in the 2023–24 season, scoring 20 goals for Green Mamba and earning E12 000. That same season he top scored in the Ingwenyama Cup, scoring in all seven games, including the winner in the final against Mbabane Highlanders, earning E10 000 for this achievement.

== Career statistics ==
=== International ===
As of match played 11 June 2025

Appearances and goals by national team and year
National team	Year	Apps	Goals
Eswatini	2012	1	0
Eswatini	2013	5	0
Eswatini	2014	0	0
Eswatini	2015	9	4
Eswatini	2016	10	2
Eswatini	2017	3	0
Eswatini	2018	0	0
Eswatini	2019	8	1
Eswatini	2020	0	0
Eswatini	2021	9	2
Eswatini	2022	10	6
Eswatini	2023	8	0
Eswatini	2024	12	2
Eswatini	2025	3	0
Total		78	17

Scores and results list Eswatini's goal tally first, score column indicates score after each Ndzinisa goal.

List of international goals scored by Sabelo Ndzinisa
No.	Date	Venue	Opponent	Score	Result	Competition
1	22 May 2015	Royal Bafokeng Stadium, Phokeng, South Africa	Madagascar	1–1	1–1	2015 COSAFA Cup
2	21 June 2015	Somhlolo National Stadium, Lobamba, Eswatini	Angola	2–2	2–2	2016 African Nations Championship qualification
3	6 September 2015	Somhlolo National Stadium, Lobamba, Eswatini	Malawi	2–2	2–2	2017 Africa Cup of Nations qualification
4	9 October 2015	El Hadj Hassan Gouled Aptidon Stadium, Djibouti City, Djibouti	Djibouti	2–0	6–0	2018 FIFA World Cup qualification
5	5 June 2016	Somhlolo National Stadium, Lobamba, Eswatini	Guinea	1–0	1–0	2017 Africa Cup of Nations qualification
6	25 June 2016	Sam Nujoma Stadium, Windhoek, Namibia	DR Congo	1–0	1–0	2016 COSAFA Cup
7	27 May 2019	King Zwelithini Stadium, Durban, South Africa	Comoros	1–0	2–2	2019 COSAFA Cup
8	14 July 2021	Wolfson Stadium, Port Elizabeth, South Africa	Botswana	1–0	1–1	2021 COSAFA Cup
9	16 July 2021	Nelson Mandela Bay Stadium, Port Elizabeth, South Africa	Senegal	2–0	2–2	2021 COSAFA Cup
10	27 March 2022	Mbombela Stadium, Mbombela, South Africa	Somalia	1–0	2–1	2023 Africa Cup of Nations qualification
11	3 June 2022	Stade de Kégué, Lomé, Togo	Togo	1–1	2–2	2023 Africa Cup of Nations qualification
12	7 June 2022	FNB Stadium, Johannesburg, South Africa	Burkina Faso	1–0	1–3	2023 Africa Cup of Nations qualification
13	6 July 2022	King Zwelithini Stadium, Durban, South Africa	Mauritius	3–0	3–0	2022 COSAFA Cup
14	8 July 2022	King Zwelithini Stadium, Durban, South Africa	Malawi	2–2	2–2	2022 COSAFA Cup
15	10 July 2022	King Zwelithini Stadium, Durban, South Africa	Lesotho	2–0	2–0	2022 COSAFA Cup
16	20 March 2024	Ben M'Hamed El Abdi Stadium, El Jadida, Morocco	Somalia	2–0	3–0	2025 Africa Cup of Nations qualification
17	26 March 2024	Mbombela Stadium, Mbombela, South Africa	Somalia	1–0	2–2	2025 Africa Cup of Nations qualification

== Honours ==
Mbabane Swallows

Winner

- Swazi Premier League: 2012–13
- Swazi Cup: 2013

Runner-up

- Swazi Premier League (2): 2013–14, 2014–15
