= Muzi Tsabedze =

Liswati footballer

Personal information
- Date of birth: 23 September 1998 (age 28)
- Position: Forward

Team information
- Current team: Manzini Sea Birds

Senior career*
Years	Team	Apps	(Gls)
- Manzini Sea Birds

International career^{‡}
2014–2017	Eswatini U20		
2015	Eswatini U23		
2020–	Eswatini	5	(0)
- * Club domestic league appearances and goals ‡ National team caps and goals as of 05:15, 26 May 2026 (UTC)

Muzi Tsabedze (born 23 September 1998) is a Liswati footballer who plays as a forward for Manzini Sea Birds and the Eswatini national team.

== Club career ==
Tsabedze played his first season of top-flight football in 2012–13 with the newly promoted Manzini Sea Birds, notably scoring in a victory over 12-time champions Mbabane Highlanders. The following season he scored a gamewinner against Manzini Wanderers, another giant of Swazi football. After years of struggling at the bottom of the table, the team was finally relegated after the 2016–17 season.

In the second-tier, Tsabedze led the Manzini Sea Birds to a league title in 2017–18 and promotion back into the MTN Premier League. He also earned league player of the year honors after finishing as the joint-top scorer with 14 goals. On 2 December 2018 Tsabedze scored in a 4–1 win over Manzini Wanderers and earned man of the match honors; the Times of Swaziland called him "eccentric" and "a handful with his pace and skill."

Tsabedze scored 18 goals in the 2021–22 Premier League of Eswatini season.

== International career ==
Tsabedze received his first callup to the Eswatini under-20s at the age of 15. He later played a significant role at the 2017 COSAFA U-20 Cup in Zambia, scoring against Malawi and Uganda in group play. He also represented the Eswatini U23s during 2015 Africa U-23 Cup of Nations qualification, netting a goal against Zimbabwe.

Tsabedze was called up to the senior national team ahead of 2021 Africa Cup of Nations qualification. He made his debut in a Group I fixture against Congo on 12 November 2020, replacing Phiwayinkhosi Dlamini during the 2–0 loss.

== Career statistics ==
=== International ===
As of 16 June 2026

Eswatini
Year	Apps	Goals
2020	1	0
2022	2	0
2025	2	0
Total	5	0

== Honours ==
=== Club ===
Manzini Sea Birds

- National First Division: 2017–18

=== Individual ===
- National First Division player of the season: 2017–18
- National First Division top scorer: 2017–18 (shared)
- 8Bet Trade Fair Cup top scorer: 2025
