= Chris Tembo =

Zambian footballer and coach

Personal information
- Full name: Christopher Tembo
- Place of birth: Zambia
- Position: Defender

Senior career*
Years	Team	Apps	(Gls)
- Zanaco F.C.

International career
1990–1993	Zambia		

Managerial career
- Nakambala Leopards F.C.
- –2014: Nakambala Leopards F.C. (assistant)
- Zanaco F.C.
- 2014: Mbabane Swallows F.C.
- 2017–: Malanti Chiefs F.C.
- * Club domestic league appearances and goals

Chris 'Gazza' Tembo is a Zambian football coach who manages Malanti Chiefs of the Swazi Premier League as of 2017.

== Coaching career ==
He was announced as head coach of 2012-13 Swazi Premier League winners Mbabane Swallows in January 2014, Tembo's first match in charge would be a 2014 CAF Champions League qualifier facing Zambian team Nkana, whose coach Masauso Mwale accepted his appointment with equanimity. Tembo then lead the Swallows to a 2–0 victory in the first leg, before losing to them 5–2 in the second leg even though he expressed determination for his team to hold onto their lead. Later, in April that year, despite former Swallows manager Jani Simulambo advising him to be patient with the club early on, the Zambian coach was fired with immediate effect by the board.

Going back to Swaziland to coach Malanti Chiefs in 2017, the Zambian former footballer's first fixture in charge was a domestic league game opposing Moneni Pirates.
