= Emmanuel Owusu =

Ghanaian footballer (born 2001)

Personal information
- Date of birth: 15 January 2001 (age 25)
- Place of birth: Ho, Ghana
- Position: Midfielder

Team information
- Current team: Sfîntul Gheorghe
- Number: 14

Senior career*
Years	Team	Apps	(Gls)
2019–2021	Ashanti Gold	22	(4)
2021	Sfîntul Gheorghe	0	(0)
2022	Hungry Lions F.C.	4	(0)
2022-2024	Mbabane Highlanders		
2024	Mbabane Swallows	0	(0)
- * Club domestic league appearances and goals as of 14 September 2021

Emmanuel Owusu (born 15 January 2001) is a Ghanaian professional footballer, who plays as a midfielder for Moldovan club FC Sfîntul Gheorghe. He previously played for Ghanaian Premier League side Ashanti Gold.

== Career ==
=== Ashanti Gold ===
Owusu started his professional career with Obuasi-based team Ashanti Gold in the Ghana Premier League in 2019. On 5 May 2019, during the 2019 GFA Normalization Committee Competition, he was included in the match day line-up squad in against Berekum Chelsea. He was chosen to start the game, and marked his first-team debut with a goal in the second half, contributing to a 2–1 win. On 15 May 2019, he made two assists, with one in the 4th minute to Mumuni Shafiu and the other to Amos Kofi Nkrumah in the 84th minute during a 4–1 win against Aduana Stars.

The following week, Owusu scored a second half brace in an away match against Techiman Eleven Wonders to push Ash Gold to a 3–0 victory. He played his first match of the 2020–21 season when he came on as a late substitute for Eric Esso in a 5–1 victory over King Faisal Babes.

=== Sfîntul Gheorghe ===
Owusu joined Moldovan side FC Sfîntul Gheorghe on a free transfer, signing a one-year deal with club with a chance of signing a long-term contract based on his performance.

=== Return Africa ===
After his time in Moldova, returned to Africa and played 2022 a half year in 4 games for the Hungry Lions F.C. in the National First Division, before moved to Eswatini to play for the Mbabane Highlanders F.C. and Mbabane Swallows F.C.
