= Swazi Cup =

- Founded: 1980

The Swazi Cup is the top knockout tournament of the Swazi football. It was created in 1980.

== Winners ==
- 1969 : Mbabane Highlanders
- 1976 : Mbabane Highlanders
- 1977 : ?
- 1978 : ?
- 1978 : ?
- 1980 : Bulembu Young Aces
- 1982 : Bulembu Young Aces
- 1983 : Mbabane Highlanders
- 1984 : Manzini Wanderers
- 1985 : Mbabane Highlanders
- 1986 : Mbabane Swallows
- 1988 : Denver Sundowns
- 1989 : Moneni Pirates FC
- 1990 : Mbabane Highlanders
- 1991 : Denver Sundowns
- 1992 : Denver Sundowns 2–0 Royal Leopards
- 1993 : Eleven Men in Flight 2–1 Denver Sundowns
- 1994 : Juventus Kwaluseni
- 1995 : Mhlambanyatsi Rovers
- 1997 : Mbabane Highlanders
- 1998 : ?
- 1999 : Mbabane Highlanders
- 2000 : Mhlume United
- 2001 : Eleven Men in Flight 1–1 (4–3 p) Mbabane Swallows
- 2004 : Green Mamba 5–1 Denver Sundowns
- 2005 : Hub Sundowns 2–0 Malanti Chiefs
- 2006 : Mbabane Swallows 1–0 (a.p.) Malanti Chiefs
- 2007 : Royal Leopards 1–0 Manzini Sundowns
- 2008 : Malanti Chiefs 2–1 Royal Leopards
- 2009 : Mbabane Highlanders 2–1 Manzini Wanderers
- 2010 : Mbabane Highlanders 1–0 Umbelebele Jomo Cosmos
- 2011 : Royal Leopards 4–3 (aet) Mhlambanyatsi Rovers
- 2012 : Green Mamba 3–1 Mbabane Highlanders
- 2013 : Mbabane Swallows 5–3 (a.e.t.) Malanti Chiefs
- 2014 : Royal Leopards 3–1 Young Buffaloes
- 2015 : Moneni Pirates 2–0 Manzini Wanderers
- 2016 : Mbabane Swallows 2–1 Green Mamba
- 2017 : Young Buffaloes 2–0 Matsapha United
- 2018 : Young Buffaloes 2–1 Manzini Wanderers
- 2019 : Young Buffaloes 1–0 Royal Leopards
- 2020 : Abandoned
