= Swazi football league system =

The Swazi football league system is the national football competition system in Eswatini. It is organized by the Eswatini Football Association.

The Premier League of Eswatini is the top-flight of football in Eswatini. Clubs earn promotion from and relegation to the second-tier National First Division. Below the second tier, the clubs are grouped into leagues based upon their geographic location within the regions of Eswatini. Each of Eswatini's four regions has its own local association under the EFA. Each regional association organizes its league at the third through fifth tiers to determine who will compete in the tier-1 and 2 national divisions.

The four regional associations are the:

- Hhohho Regional Football Association
- Lubombo Regional Football Association
- Manzini Regional Football Association
- Shiselweni Regional Football Association

== League structure ==
Level	League(s)/Division(s)			
1	Premier League of Eswatini; 16 clubs			
2	National First Division; 14 clubs			
3	Hhohho Regional Super League; Northern Stream & Southern Stream	Lubombo Regional Super League; 1 stream only	Manzini Regional Super League; 1 stream only	Shiselweni Regional Super League; Northern Stream & Southern Stream
4	Hhohho Regional Promotion Leagues; 2 divisions (A, B)	Lubombo Regional Promotion Leagues; 8 leagues	Manzini Regional Promotion Leagues (Mafutseni)	Shiselweni Regional Promotion Leagues; 2 leagues (Nhlangano, Hlatikulu)
5	Hhohho Zonal Leagues	Lubombo Zonal Leagues	Manzini Zonal Leagues	Shiselweni Zonal Leagues

== See also ==
- Football in Eswatini
