= Alois Ngwerume =

Zimbabwean footballer (born 1983)

Personal information
- Date of birth: 21 August 1983 (age 43)
- Place of birth: Zimbabwe
- Height: 1.75 m (5 ft 9 in)
- Positions: Midfielder; forward

Youth career
- CAPS United F.C.

Senior career*
Years	Team	Apps	(Gls)
–2003	Highdon Raylton		
2003–2005	Moroka Swallows F.C.		
20??–2010	Dynamos Harare		
2011–2013	Jomo Cosmos F.C.	3	(0)
2014	Mbabane Swallows F.C.		

International career
- Zimbabwe U20
- * Club domestic league appearances and goals

Alois Ngwerume (born 21 August 1983) is a Zimbabwean former footballer who last played for Mbabane Swallows of the Swazi Premier League in 2014.

== Career ==
=== South Africa ===
Netting 6 goals during his first season with Moroka Swallows of the South African Premier Division in 2003, Ngwerume aimed to top the scorers' chart in 2004/05 The Zimbabwean next returned to South Africa in 2011, where he adapted to the role of central midfielder with Jomo Cosmos.

=== Mbabane Swallows ===
Joining 2012-13 Swazi Premier League champions Mbabane Swallows after their 2014 Swazi Charity Cup success, Ngwerume was forced to leave in December that year, much to the annoyance of local fans. Following his stint there, Ngwerume was inexorable that he would never return to Swaziland.
