= Manqoba Kunene =

Swaziland footballer

Personal information
- Full name: Manqoba Kunene
- Date of birth: 22 October 1982 (age 44)
- Place of birth: Swaziland
- Position: Midfielder

Senior career*
Years	Team	Apps	(Gls)
2002–2003	Mhlambanyatsi Rovers		
2003–2005	Silver Stars		
2005–	Mbabane Swallows		

International career
2003–	Swaziland	11	(0)
- * Club domestic league appearances and goals

Manqoba Kunene (born 22 October 1982) is a Swazi professional footballer who plays as a midfielder. As of February 2010, he plays for Mbabane Swallows in the Swazi Premier League and has won 11 caps for his country.
