= Eswatini Promotion Leagues =

Promotion Leagues
- Organising body: Eswatini Football Association
- Country: Eswatini
- Confederation: CAF
- Level on pyramid: 4
- Promotion to: Regional Super Leagues
- Relegation to: Zonal Leagues
- Website: Website

The Promotion Leagues are the fourth-tier leagues of football in Eswatini, operating under the auspices of the Eswatini Football Association.

== Organization ==
Each of the Promotion Leagues falls under one of Eswatini's four Regional Super Leagues. The three lowest-ranked teams in each Super League are relegated to the Promotion League which fall under the respective Regional Super League. The top three clubs from each Promotion League are likewise promoted to the corresponding Stream of its respective Super League the following season.
