= Cheick Cissé =

Malian footballer

Personal information
- Full name: Cheick Bongouta Cissé
- Date of birth: 25 October 1987 (age 39)
- Place of birth: Mali
- Position: Striker

Senior career*
Years	Team	Apps	(Gls)
–2008	CSK		
2008–2009	Mbabane Highlanders F.C.		
–2011	Mbabane Swallows F.C.		
2011–2013	Moroka Swallows F.C.	18	(1)

International career
2006	Mali U23		
- * Club domestic league appearances and goals

Cheick Bongouta Cissé (born 25 October 1987 in Mali) is a Malian footballer who is last known to have played for Moroka Swallows of the South African National First Division.

== Career ==
=== Mbabane Highlanders ===
Transferring to Swazi Premier League title contenders Mbabane Highlanders in 2008 and scoring a goal on his cup debut opposing Eleven Men, Cissé threatened to leave the club after not being paid for the six weeks since his arrival.

=== Moroka Swallows ===
On trial with Moroka Swallows of the South African top division, the Malian striker officially penned a two-year deal with them in January 2011. However, after getting cleared to play, Cissé put in a torpid performance for the club despite being given 11 starts by coach Gordon Igesund in his first six months with the Swallows. This was coupled with injury, which caused him to be finally released by the South African outfit in 2013.
