= Mzwandile Mamba =

Swazi footballer

Mzwandile Sisonkhe Mamba (16 July 1981 – 18 September 2010) was a Swazi footballer with the Royal Leopards of the Swazi Premier League. He won the footballer of the year in Swaziland for 2006–2007. He was also a key member of the Swaziland national football team.

His previous clubs include Mbabane Swallows.

== Sources ==
- Angola Just A Point Away MTN African Football News, 15 June 2007
