= Tambankulu Stadium =

Football stadium in Eswatini

- The Slaughterhouse
- Interactive map of Tambankulu Stadium
- Location: Tambankulu, Eswatini
- Coordinates: 26.1283°S 31.9302°E
- Capacity: 2,000
- Surface: Grass

Tenant
- Tambankulu Callies FC

Tambankulu Stadium is a 2,000-seat association football stadium in Tambankulu, Eswatini. It is home to Tambankulu Callies FC of the Premier League of Eswatini.
