= Jocial Tchakounte =

Cameroonian footballer

Personal information
- Full name: Jocial Tchakounte Tchuilen
- Date of birth: 11 August 1989 (age 37)
- Place of birth: Cameroon
- Position: Defender

Senior career*
Years	Team	Apps	(Gls)
- Mbabane Swallows F.C.
2015–2016	Ağrı Gençlerbirliği Spor Kulübü		
2016	Kurtalanspor		
2016–20xx	Ağrı 1970 Spor		
2017	Lapsekispor		
2018–	Ayeyawady United F.C.		
- * Club domestic league appearances and goals

Jocial Tchakounte (born 11 August 1989 in Cameroon) is a Cameroonian professional footballer who is currently a member of Ayeyawady United of the Myanmar National League as of 2018.

== Career ==
=== Swaziland ===
A member of Mbabane Swallows squad in 2013, Tchakounte had to go to South Africa for personal reasons in January that year before arriving back in Swaziland in time for the league fixture confronting Malanti Chiefs. The Cameroonian then parted ways with the Swallows in July, with the Times of Swaziland maligning him as 'Arguably the least popular player' in the lineup. This was followed by Mbabane Swallows recalling the defender in early 2014, but he had still not returned by late January and was still in South Africa.

=== Turkey ===
Brought in by Ağrı Gençlerbirliği in 2015 with Cameroonian Guillaume N'Kendo in 2015, Tchakounte said he enjoyed the city and its residents upon arrival.

Completed a move to Lapsekispor in 2017.
