= EZU =

EZU may refer to:

- EZU, rapper who collaborated on multiple tracks with Bangs
- Ekstremnim zimskim uslovima (rescue, evacuation and care in extreme winter conditions), part of the disaster response of the Red Cross of Serbia
- EZU, abbreviation of Ezulwini United F.C., team that played in the 2024–25 Premier League of Eswatini
- EZU, NYSE Arca code for iShares MSCI EMU Index, an American exchange-traded fund
