= Mayaluka Stadium =

Stadium in Big Bend, Eswatini

- Interactive map of Mayaluka Stadium
- Location: Big Bend, Eswatini
- Coordinates: 26.7901°S 31.9374°E
- Capacity: 1,000
- Surface: Grass

Tenant
- Ubombo Sugar FC (1998–present)

The Mayaluka Stadium is an association football stadium in Big Bend in the Lubombo Region of Eswatini. The stadium is the home venue of Premier League of Eswatini club Ubombo Sugar FC and is fully owned by the club and its owners, Ubombo Sugar. The stadium is located in Mayaluka on Ubombo Sugar's estate.

== Events ==
The stadium has hosted matches of the Eswatini national football team. In 2024, the stadium was the venue for the semi-finals of Eswatini's national Schools Soccer Tournament.
