= Mfanafuthi =

Mfanafuthi is a masculine given name. Notable people with the name include:

- Johnstone Mfanafuthi Makatini (1932–1988), South African politician and anti-apartheid activist
- Mfanafuthi Bhembe (born 1982), Liswati footballer
- Mfanafuthi Prince Nxumalo (born 1990), South African footballer
