= Mfanfuthi Bhembe =

Liswati footballer (born 1982)

Mfanafuthi Bhembe
Personal information
- Full name: Mfanafuthi Taribo Bhembe
- Date of birth: 9 October 1982 (age 44)
- Place of birth: Mbabane, Swaziland
- Height: 5 ft 11 in (1.80 m)
- Position: Forward

Team information
- Current team: Mbabane Swallows

Youth career
- 1993–2000: Midas City FC

College career
Years	Team	Apps	(Gls)
2005–2008	Alabama A&M University	63	(24)

Senior career*
Years	Team	Apps	(Gls)
1998–2000	Nkomazi Sundowns F.C.	19	(10)
2000–2005	Mbabane Swallows	28	(21)
2009	Mbabane Swallows	5	(1)
2009–2011	Jomo Cosmos	8	(0)
2011–	Mbabane Swallows		

International career^{‡}
2005–2011	Swaziland	35	(8)
- * Club domestic league appearances and goals ‡ National team caps and goals as of 16:40, 17 December 2017 (UTC)

Mfanafuthi Taribo Bhembe (born 9 October 1982) is a Liswati footballer who played for Mbabane Swallows.

== Career ==
Bhembe began his career at Nkomazi Sundowns F.C. and one year later in 2000 joined Mbabane Swallows, before he attended in July 2006 by Alabama A&M University.

=== United States ===
He notched 14 goals in 16 appearances during a surprise senior season in 2008 for Alabama A&M University of the SWAC Conference, helping the side to a 9–5–3 record last fall. The resulting 1.94 points per game were tied for the fifth most in Division I last season, while his 14 goals ranked tied for 10th overall.

Lagerwey says: "Futhi was the fifth leading goal scorer in Division I this season. He's a quick attacking player that got things done at the collegiate level, so we're anxious to see if that can translate to the pros."

=== Draft ===
Selected by Real Salt Lake in the fourth round (57th overall) of the 2009 MLS SuperDraft.

He then joined to Real Salt Lake in January 2009 and was released on Mid 2009.

=== Return to Africa ===
He returned to Mbabane Swallows on 10 February 2009 and signed on 10 July 2009 for South African club Jomo Cosmos.

== Clubs ==
- 2003–2004: Royal Leopards F.C.
- 2004–2006: Mbabane Swallows
- 2006–2008: Alabama A&M University
- 2009: Mbabane Swallows
- 2009–2010: Jomo Cosmos

== International ==
Bhembe was from 2005 to 2006 regular member of the Swaziland national football team and is currently on attention.
