= Ubombo Sugar F.C. =

Eswatini football club

Ubombo Sugar FC
- Full name: Ubombo Sugar Football Club
- Founded: 1998
- Ground: Mayaluka Stadium
- Capacity: 1,000
- Chairman: Gcina Ndwandwe
- Manager: Bongani Mdluli
- League: Premier League of Eswatini
- 2025-26: Premier League of Eswatini, 12th of 16
- Website: Website

Ubombo Sugar FC is a Eswatini association football club based in Big Bend in the Lubombo Region that currently competes in the Premier League of Eswatini.

== History ==
Ubombo Sugar FC was established in 1998 as Illovo FC. It was founded and fully sponsored by Illovo Sugar, a major sugar producer in Eswatini and the largest in Africa. The club was relegated from the Premier League of Eswatini following the 2007–2008 season.

Following a poor 2010 season, Illovo was relegated again, this time to the Super Leagues, which prompted a major overhaul at the club in the off-season. The club finished second in the National First Division in 2023 to earn promotion back to the top fight for the first time in 15 years.

Ahead of the 2025–26 Premier League season, it was announced that the club had formally requested to rebrand to Ubombo Sugar FC with the Eswatini Football Association. The change was requested after Illovo Sugar ceased to exist and was delisted from the Johannesburg Stock Exchange. Illovo's previous assets, including the football club, then fell under the umbrella of Ubombo Sugar Limited. The new, rebranded identity was revealed at an event on 23 July 2025 and included the public unveiling of the club's new logo and kits for the upcoming season. At that time the club also announced a three-year kit sponsorship deal with Primo Sportswear worth a total of E873 000.

== Stadium ==
The club plays its home matches at the Mayaluka Stadium which is also fully owned by the club and Ubombo Sugar. The stadium is located in Mayaluka on the company's estate.

== Domestic results ==
Key

Champion Runners-up 3rd Place

Season	League							Notes
Season	Div.	Pos.	Pl.	W	D	L	Pts.	Notes
2022–23	2nd	2nd	26	16	5	5	54	promoted to Premier League
2023–24	1st	7th	26	8	10	8	34	
2024–25	1st	7th	26	9	8	9	35	
2025–26	1st	12th	30	9	8	13	35	
