= Jani Simulambo =

Zambian footballer and coach (born 1953)

Personal information
- Full name: Jani Liabwa Simulambo
- Date of birth: 9 November 1953 (age 72)
- Place of birth: Livingstone, Northern Rhodesia
- Position: Defender

Youth career
- –1968: Maramba Dynamos
- 1968–1972: Livingstone Jets FC

Senior career*
Years	Team	Apps	(Gls)
1972–1973	Lusaka Tigers		
1973–1980	Green Buffaloes		
1980–1982	Kabwe Warriors		
1982–1983	Profund Warriors		
1983–1989	Mbabane Highlanders		

International career
1971–1981	Zambia	75	(7)

Managerial career
- 1983–1989: Mbabane Highlanders
- 1990–1993: Mhlume FC
- 1991: Swaziland
- 1993–1996: Eleven Men in Flight F.C.
- 1997–1998: Moneni Pirates FC
- 1997: Swaziland
- 1998–2000: Bush Bucks
- 2000–2001: Black Leopards
- 2001–2002: Golden Arrows
- 2002: Tembisa Classic
- * Club domestic league appearances and goals

Jani Liabwa Simulambo (born 9 November 1953) is a former Zambian footballer and coach. Nicknamed Be Good, Simulambo had an outstanding career and played at the heart of Zambia’s midfield for close to ten years, representing the country at the 1974 and 1978 African Cup of Nations and was named Zambian captain in 1980.

== Early life ==
Simulambo was born in Livingstone in a family of ten of which nine were boys. Two of his brothers would also go on to play football, Victor for Zamcoal Diggers in Maamba and Christopher for Nchanga Rangers. He lost his father at the age of ten and was a keen student who also loved playing soccer. He attended Church of Christ School before proceeding to Hillcrest Secondary School.

== Playing career ==
Simulambo first featured for amateur side Livingstone Jets and played in the Zambia Schools squad leading to a call-up to the Zambia Olympic team, where he was spotted by First Division side Lusaka Tigers and when he completed school he moved to Lusaka and joined them in January 1972.

At Tigers, Simulambo formed a good partnership with Stanley Phiri, Leonard Mwiinde and Joseph Njuka and in his first season, the team finished in a comfortable mid-table position. In October 1972, Simulambo's former school master organised a trip to England where he spent six weeks training with Division I side Leeds United’s youth team and according to Simulambo, he impressed Leeds coach Don Revie whose recommendation that the club should sign him was turned down by the team’s board.

Soon afterwards, he was snapped up by Zambia Army FC who were only in their second season in Zambia’s top flight and he helped the team to its first ever league title ahead of established teams like Mufulira Wanderers, Roan United and Kabwe Warriors. The team, which would later change its name to Green Buffaloes, had the likes of Dick Chama, Obby Kapita, Milton Muke, Francis Kajiya, Emmy Musonda, Felix Chalwe, Donwell Yobe and Pele Kaimana, and was a force to reckon with, winning the league three times in a row including 1974 when they ended the season unbeaten. It was here that Simulambo earned the nickname ‘Minister of the midfield’ due to his usual dominance in the middle of the pitch.

Simulambo also won the Shell Challenge Cup in 1975, 1977 and 1979, the Champion of Champions Cup in 1975 and 1979, the 1978 Heroes & Unity Cup, and the Charity Shield in 1974, 1978 and 1980.

After eight seasons and five league titles with Buffaloes, Simulambo's services with the army were terminated for undisclosed reasons in September 1980 and despite being told he was no longer with the army, he still went ahead to play his last game, an Independence Cup quarterfinal match against Red Arrows which Buffaloes won 3-1 due to his ‘love for the club,’ while the team's management said they would miss him and wished him well.

He joined Kabwe Warriors and scored twice on his debut, a 3–1 win over Mufulira Wanderers in a league match on 1 October 1980, which came about two weeks after leaving the army. He did not stay at Warriors for long as he left to join promotion side Profund Warriors in February 1982.

At the end of the season, he was on the move again, moving to Mbabane Highlanders in Swaziland and is believed to be the first foreign player to have played there. He won several titles with Highlanders and his skillful play earned him the nickname ‘Be Good,’ with the fans willing him to not get sent off or show way ward discipline as the team benefited greatly with him on the field of play. Simulambo also opened the way for his former teammates at Profund Warriors Texan Phiri, Ronald Chinku, Fred Kunda and Chola Mulundu to play in Swaziland.

== National team ==
Simulambo was first selected to the Zambian Olympic team that faced Ethiopia in May 1971, when he was a student at Hillcrest Secondary School though the inexperienced team lost 7–3 on aggregate.

Later that year in November, Simulambo was in the Zambia B’’ team that travelled to Tanzania for a tournament to mark that country’s 10th independence anniversary. He made his full international debut when Zambia eclipsed Nigeria 5-1 in a 1974 CAN qualifier in Lusaka, on their way to a 7-4 aggregate victory that qualified them to the CAN 1974. He featured for the ‘B’ side again at ECA 1973 in Uganda as well as World Cup qualifiers against Zaire and Morocco and did enough to get a call-up to the CAN squad where he played in all the matches as Zambia went all the way to the final.

He also featured at CAN 1978 where Zambia failed to make it out of their group and further represented Zambia in Olympics qualifiers and several CECAFA Cup tournaments. He succeeded Ackim Musenge as Zambian captain in January 1980 but his stint as captain was short-lived for after Zambia lost to the hosts in Zimbabwe’s independence tournament in April of that year, he was left out of the squad after injury and subsequent loss of form. As a result, he missed out on the Summer Olympic Games in Moscow.

In March 1981, he was recalled to the Zambian squad by coach Ted Dumitru who expressed surprise that a player of his calibre was not in the team and it was only fair for him and football fans to give him another chance in the team.

He featured in the two legged CAN qualifier against Morocco and played a key role in a 3-2 aggregate victory as Zambia grabbed their ticket to CAN 1982. He was however dropped from the travelling party for reporting late to camp in February 1982 and that marked the end of his international career.

== Coaching career ==
During his time at Highlanders where he was player-coach, Simulambo won five titles after which he left to join Mhlume FC in 1990. He was also attached to the Swaziland national team and one of his biggest achievements was beating Zambia 2–1 in a CAN qualifier in April 1991 in Mbabane, their first ever win over Zambia.

He then coached Eleven Men in Flight where he won the BP Challenge Cup and had a stint with Moneni Pirates before being re-appointed Swaziland national team coach. He then crossed over to South African side Bush Bucks in 1998. Two years later, his contract was not renewed so he signed up with Black Leopards on a one-year contract. He was then engaged by Golden Arrows as Technical Director for two seasons and then replaced Louis Mabotsa as First Division Tembisa Classic Head Coach where he stayed for one season. When his contract was not renewed, he was hired by University of KwaZulu to drill the football team.

It was during this period that he joined the Bay United Technical bench headed by Vladislav Heric and helped the team win promotion to the PSL. But when the team was demoted the following season, Simulambo was put in charge of the developmental side where he trained his three sons, Desmond, Brazil and Sizwe.

== Personal life ==
Simulambo married Victoria Tembo in February 1980 and they have seven children. Due to his love of Brazilian football, Simulambo gave his second born son the unusual first name of Brazil.

While in the Zambia Army, he rose to the rank of Captain and he is also a UK qualified accountant. When his mother died in 2011, Simulambo returned to Zambia and settled in Lusaka.

== Honours ==
=== Player ===
==== Green Buffaloes ====
- Zambian League Championship: 1973, 1974, 1975, 1977, 1979
- Shell Challenge Cup: 1975, 1977, 1979
- Heroes & Unity Cup: 1978
- Champion of Champions Cup: 1975, 1979
- Charity Shield: 1974, 1978, 1980

==== Mbabane Highlanders ====
- Swazi Premier League: 1984, 1986, 1988
- Swazi Cup: 1983, 1985

=== Manager ===
==== Mbabane Highlanders ====
- Swazi Premier League: 1984, 1986, 1988
- Swazi Cup: 1983, 1985

==== Eleven Men in Flight ====
- Swazi Cup: 1994
