= Ndzinisa =

Ndzinisa is an African surname. Notable people with the surname include:

- Phumlile Ndzinisa (born 1992), Swazi runner
- Sabelo Ndzinisa (born 1991), Swazi football player
