= 2018 Swazi Cup =

Tournament details
- Country: Swaziland

Final positions
- Champions: Young Buffaloes

The 2018 Swazi Bank Cup is the 15th edition of the Swazi Bank Cup (37th edition including earlier cup competitions), the knockout football competition of Swaziland.

== Round of 16 ==
[Mar 10]

Manzini Wanderers 1-0 Vovovo

Royal Leopards 2-0 Tambuti

Tambankulu Callies 2-2 Young Buffaloes [6-7 pen]

Malanti Chiefs 5-1 Moneni Pirates

Manzini Sundowns 1-0 Sikhalo seAfrika

[Mar 11]

Green Mamba 1-0 Mbabane Swallows

Zibonele Vultures 1-1 Matsapha United [1-4 pen]

Mbabane Highlanders 3-0 Midas City

== Quarterfinals ==
[all matches at Somhlolo National Stadium]

[Apr 7]

Malanti Chiefs 1-3 Green Mamba

Young Buffaloes 0-1 Royal Leopards

[Apr 8]

Manzini Wanderers 0-0 Manzini Sundowns [aet, 9-8 pen]

Mbabane Highlanders 1-1 Matsapha United [aet, 5-4 pen]

== Semifinals ==
[Apr 15, King Sobhuza Stadium]

Young Buffaloes 2-2 Green Mamba [aet, 5-3 pen]

[Apr 16, Somhlolo National Stadium]

Mbabane Highlanders 0-2 Manzini Wanderers

== Final ==
[May 6, Somhlolo National Stadium]

Manzini Wanderers 1-2 Young Buffaloes

[Kola Aledeonkun 5; Phiwa Dlamini 28, 85]

== See also ==
- 2017–18 Swazi Premier League
