= Seagulls at papal events =

Seagulls have been seen near the Sistine Chapel's chimney during conclaves twice during the 2013 and 2025 conclaves. The seagulls' time near the chimney has been the subject of general attention from social media and claims of religious symbolism. Seagulls have also been seen attacking doves released by popes.

== History ==
On the second day of the 2013 conclave, people saw a seagull near the Sistine Chapel's chimney. Two Twitter accounts were quickly made to the imitate the seagulls. After white smoke came out of chimney, the bird flew away.

In 2013, Pope Benedict XVI released two doves for the Caravan for Peace. After being released, the second dove was attacked by a seagull, but the dove was able to escape. A similar thing happened when Pope Francis released two doves in 2014.

The seagulls were seen during the 2025 conclave. The seagulls received attention from social media during the conclave, many of which were excited that there was a seagull chick.

== Reception ==
Edward-Isaac Dovere described the 2013 bird as symbolism, comparing the seagull to a phoenix. Michael Peppard, writing for commonweal, had a similar view, stating he believed the bird was meant to be "associate[d] this with the most famous bird omen in papal history, the election of Pope Fabian". Frank Mazzaglia, writing for MetroWest Daily News, called the seagull prophetic due to Pope Francis's namesake, Saint Francis, connection with birds.

In 2025, Katie McGrady, a Vatican analyst for CNN, called the seagulls the mascots of the conclave. A group of people baptized the birds as "Sistine".
