= Eswatini Regional Super Leagues =

Regional Super Leagues
- Organising body: Eswatini Football Association
- Country: Eswatini
- Confederation: CAF
- Level on pyramid: 3
- Promotion to: National First Division
- Relegation to: Promotion Leagues
- Website: Website

The Regional Super Leagues are the third-tier leagues of football in Eswatini, operating under the auspices of the Eswatini Football Association.

== Organization ==
There are four Regional Super Leagues, one for each of the regions of Eswatini. They are the:

- Hhohho Regional Super League
- Lubombo Regional Super League
- Manzini Regional Super League
- Shiselweni Regional Super League

The winner of each Regional Super League is determined via a play-off among winners of each stream within the Super League. For example, the Hhohho Regional Football Association (HRFA) Super League consists of a Southern and Northern Stream. As of the 2024/2025 season, the four lowest-ranked teams in the National First Division are automatically relegated to their Regional Super Leagues while the champion of each Super League joins the National First Division the following season.

The three lowest-ranked teams in each Super League are relegated to the Promotion Leagues which fall under the respective Regional Super Leagues.
