= Dennis Fakudze =

Liswati footballer

Personal information
- Date of birth: 13 June 1983 (age 43)
- Place of birth: Swaziland
- Positions: Right-back; centre-back

Senior career*
Years	Team	Apps	(Gls)
2005–2008	Mbabane Swallows		
2008–	Royal Leopards		

International career
2007–	Swaziland	20	(0)
- * Club domestic league appearances and goals

Dennis Fakudze (born 13 June 1983) is a Liswati former footballer who played as a defender. He has won 20 caps for his country.
