= Olayeni Fashina =

Nigerian footballer

Personal information
- Full name: Olayeni Fashina Abiodun
- Date of birth: 10 October 1990 (age 35)
- Place of birth: Lagos, Nigeria
- Position: Forward

Senior career*
| Years | Team | Apps | (Gls) |
| –2008 | Mbabane Swallows | | |
| 2008–2009 | Malanti Chiefs F.C. | | |
| 2009–2010 | Curepipe Starlight SC | | |
| 2010–2011 | Jiul Petroșani | | |
| 2011–2012 | CSM Școlar Reșița | | |
| 2013 | Flacăra Făget | | |
| 2013 | CS Vladimirescu | | |
| 2015 | Kisvárda-Master Good | | |
| 2016 | Heartland FC | 1+ | |
- * Club domestic league appearances and goals

Olayeni Fashina Abiodun (born 10 October 1990) is a Nigerian professional footballer who plays as a forward.

== Career ==
Fashina was born in Lagos, Nigeria. Donning Swazi team Malanti Chiefs' colors in 2008–09, Fashina left the club to CSSC of the Mauritian Premier League when he was still registered with them and without international clearance, leaving coach Dumsani Gimedze annoyed. Gimedze stated that before going to Mauritius, Fashina sent him a letter, fabricating that he was trialling for a French club and stopping in Mauritius only to get a visa. As a consequence, Gimedze messaged the Confederation of African Football to notify them about the incident, turning down an offer from CSSC amounting 70000 Swazi lilangenis to legally buy the player which resulted in Fashina being dropped from CSSC's squad. Despite this, however, the Nigerian returned to ply his trade with them in 2010, signing with Jiul Petroșani of the Romanian Fourth Division until the end of the 2010–11 season after a two-week trial with FC Astra Giurgiu. There, he stated his ambition to play in a higher level of the Romanian football league system, netting three goals in his first seven games. Next, the striker moved to another Romanian team, Flacăra Făget, in 2013, but was assaulted by their director after being stubborn in leaving the club.

== Personal life ==
Fashina is a practicer of Islam.
