= Red Rhinos FC =

Eswatini football club

- Full name: Red Rhinos Football Club
- Ground: Tambankulu Stadium
- Capacity: 2,000
- Chairman: (Eswatini) Sithembiso Mamba
- Manager: (Zimbabwe) Ikarbart Macocha
- League: Premier League of Eswatini
- 2025–26: Eswatini National First Division, 1st of 16 (champions)
- Website: Website

Red Rhinos FC is a Eswatini association football club based in Tambankulu in the Lubombo Region that currently competes in the Premier League of Eswatini.

== History ==
Founded as Tambankulu Callies FC, the club has existed since at least the year 2000. In 2024 the club was rebranded to Red Rhinos FC as it tried to earn promotion back to the Premier League of Eswatini.

== Domestic results ==
Key

Champion Runners-up 3rd Place

Season	League							Notes
Season	Div.	Pos.	Pl.	W	D	L	Pts.	Notes
2020–21	1st	12th	30	7	7	16	28	
2021–22	1st	5th	30	12	8	10	44	
2022–23	1st	14th	26	2	9	15	15	Relegated to National First Division
2023–24	2nd	10th	26	10	4	12	34	
2024–25	2nd	8th	24	9	6	9	33	
2025–26	2nd	1st	30	17	5	8	56	Promoted to Premier League

== Women's team ==
Red Rhinos FC also fields a team in the Eswatini Women's League, the top flight women's league in the country.
