= Caravan for Peace =

- Location: Monaco
- Fields: Peace, Sport, Development
- Founder and President: Marlene Harnois
- Key people: Didier Drogba, Prince Albert II

The Caravan for Peace was founded in 2017 by the French-Canadian Olympic medalist, Marlene Harnois in Monaco, in partnership with Peace and Sport, under the High Patronage of Prince Albert II of Monaco and presided over by Joel Bouzou. The annual event is supported by the international football player Didier Drogba and over 80 Olympians.

Convince that sport has the power to change the world, inspire younger generations and unite populations worldwide, the Caravan for Peace aims to unite Champions in order to lead all together, a humanitarian action to promote sport as a tool for Development and Peace.

Carried by the universal values of sport, friendship and solidarity, the Champions for Peace gather to support populations in disadvantage areas and to:

- Promote Sport
- Fight against HIV/AIDS
- Facilitate water access
- Promote health, education and gender equity

== History ==
The first edition of the Caravan for Peace was held in Senegal, November 16 to 19, 2017 with the participation of Olympians and World Champions, Ladji Doucouré, Marlene Harnois, Balla Dieye et Daba Modibo Keita. A water fountain was also donated to the village of Walo Keur Massamba and a ton of sporting equipment were donated to populations.

== Field actions ==
The mission of the Caravan for Peace is to:

- Promote Sport for Development and Peace
- Fight against HIV/AIDS
- Sustainable development and water access
- Education, health and gender equity

== Ambassadors ==
- Marlene Harnois, Olympic medalist & 2x European Champion Champion for Peace et founding member of the Fondation Heart Angel
- Didier Drogba, Soccer player, Goodwill Ambassador to the United Nations et President of the Didier Drogba Foundation
- Ladji Doucouré, 2x World Champion and President of Golden Blocks
- Daba Modibo Keita, 2x World Champion, Ambassador of Sports and fight against HIV/AIDS in Mali
- Balla Dieye, Olympian & 2x World medalist
- Cheick Cissé, Olympic Champion and Ambassador of the Fondation Heart Angel
- Ruth Gbagbi, Olympic medalist, World Champion and Ambassador of the Fondation Heart Angel

== Official website ==
- Official website
