= 2017 COSAFA U-20 Cup =

2017 Mopani Copper Mines COSAFA Under-20 Championship

Tournament details
- Host country: Zambia
- Dates: 6–16 December 2017
- Teams: 12 (from 1 association)

Tournament statistics
- Top scorer: (South Africa) Luvuyo Mkatshana (South Africa) Lyle Foster (Egypt) A. Amir (3 goals)
- Best player: (South Africa) Luvuyo Mkatshana

The Mopani Copper Mines COSAFA Under-20 Championship will be the 24th edition of the COSAFA U20 Cup, an international youth competition open to national associations of the COSAFA region.

The competition is open to players born on or before 1 January 1998.

== Participants ==
The following teams are expected to participate:

- Angola
- Egypt (Invitee)
- Lesotho
- Malawi
- Mauritius
- Mozambique
- Namibia
- South Africa
- Swaziland
- Uganda (Invitee)
- Zambia (Host)
- Zimbabwe

== Draw ==
The group stage draw was held on 9 November 2017 in Johannesburg, South Africa.

== Venues ==
Kitwe		Ndola
Nkana Stadium	Arthur Davies Stadium	Levy Mwanawasa Stadium
Capacity: 10,000	Capacity: 15,500	Capacity: 49,800

== Group stage ==
=== Group A ===
Pos	Team	Pld	W	D	L	GF	GA	GD	Pts	Qualification
1	Uganda (G)	3	1	2	0	5	3	+2	5	Advance to knockout stage
2	Malawi	3	1	2	0	4	3	+1	5	
3	Zambia (H)	3	1	1	1	2	2	0	4	
4	Swaziland	3	0	1	2	4	7	−3	1	

First match(es) will be played: 16 December 2017. Source:
(G) Guests; (H) Hosts
6 December 2017
11:30

Swaziland	2–3	Malawi
Tsabedze 58'; Gamedze Saviola 64' (pen.)	Report	Peter Banda 14'; Patrick Phiri 58', 68'

Arthur Davies Stadium, Kitwe
Referee: Omphile Phutego (Botswana)
6 December 2017
17:30

Zambia	0–2	Uganda
	Report	Muhammad Shaban 52', 56'

Arthur Davies Stadium, Kitwe
Referee: Nomore Musundire (Zimbabwe)
8 December 2017
14:30

Uganda	2–2	Swaziland
M. Shaban 30'; A. Okello 52'	Report	Tsabedze 24'; O. Mamba 90'

Arthur Davies Stadium, Kitwe
Referee: Joao Amado Goma (Angola)
8 December 2017
17:30

Malawi	0–0	Zambia
	Report

Arthur Davies Stadium, Kitwe
Referee: Abdoul Kanoso (Madagascar)
11 December 2017
12:00

Zambia	2–0	Swaziland
F. Mwepu 50', 90'

Nkana Stadium, Kitwe
Referee: Thando Helpus Ndzandzeka (South Africa)
11 December 2017
12:00

Malawi	1–1	Uganda
F. Madinga 70'		S. Mukwala 81'

Arthur Davies Stadium, Kitwe
Referee: Nomore Musundire (Zimbabwe)

=== Group B ===
Pos	Team	Pld	W	D	L	GF	GA	GD	Pts	Qualification
1	South Africa	3	3	0	0	5	1	+4	9	Advance to knockout stage
2	Egypt (G)	3	2	0	1	4	2	+2	6	Advance to knockout stage
3	Mozambique	3	1	0	2	2	2	0	3	
4	Mauritius	3	0	0	3	0	6	−6	0	

First match(es) will be played: 16 December 2017. Source:
(G) Guests
6 December 2017
14:30

Mozambique	0–1	Egypt
		H. Feasal 86'

Arthur Davies Stadium, Kitwe
Referee: Thando Helpus Ndzandzeka (South Africa)
7 December 2017
15:00

South Africa	2–0	Mauritius
Lyle Foster 73', 90+4'	Report

Nkana Stadium, Kitwe
Referee: Chelangat Ali Sabilla (Uganda)
9 December 2017
11:30

Egypt	2–0	Mauritius
A. Amr 17', 88'

Nkana Stadium, Kitwe
Referee: Nomore Musundire (Zimbabwe)
9 December 2017
14:30

Mozambique	0–1	South Africa
		Mkatshana 45+1'

Nkana Stadium, Kitwe
Referee: Stanley Hachiwa (Zambia)
11 December 2017
15:00

South Africa	2–1	Egypt
Ngcobo 59' L. Mkatshana. 72'		M. Karem 18'

Nkana Stadium, Kitwe
Referee: Joao Amado Goma (Angola)
11 December 2017
15:00

Mauritius	0–2	Mozambique
		21' 50'

Arthur Davies Stadium, Kitwe
Referee: Thulani Sibandze (Lesotho)

=== Group C ===
Pos	Team	Pld	W	D	L	GF	GA	GD	Pts	Qualification
1	Lesotho	3	1	2	0	2	1	+1	5	Advance to knockout stage
2	Zimbabwe	3	1	2	0	1	0	+1	5	
3	Namibia	3	1	1	1	2	2	0	4	
4	Angola	3	0	1	2	0	2	−2	1	

First match(es) will be played: 16 December 2017. Source:
7 December 2017
12:00

Lesotho	0–0	Zimbabwe
	Report

Nkana Stadium, Kitwe
Referee: Christopher Harrison (South Africa)
8 December 2017
11:30

Angola	0–1	Namibia
	Report	E. Mungendje 14'

Arthur Davies Stadium, Kitwe
Referee: Thulani Sibandze (Lesotho)
10 December 2017
12:00

Namibia	1–2	Lesotho
R. Hawiseb 64'		K. Roboama 70', 76'

Nkana Stadium, Kitwe
Referee: Omphile Phutego (Botswana)
10 December 2017
15:00

Zimbabwe	1–0	Angola
K. Nasama 90+2'

Nkana Stadium, Kitwe
Referee: Abdoul Kanoso (Madagascar)
12 December 2017
15:00

Lesotho	0–0	Angola

Arthur Davies Stadium, Kitwe
Referee: Chelangat Ali Sabilla (Uganda)
12 December 2017
15:00

Namibia	0–0	Zimbabwe

Nkana Stadium, Kitwe
Referee: Christopher Harrison (South Africa)

== Knockout stage ==
=== Semi-finals ===
14 December 2017
13:00

South Africa	1–0	Egypt
L. Mkatshana 36'	Report

Arthur Davies Stadium, Kitwe (Note: Both matches were originally scheduled to take place at Nkana Stadium. The venue was changed due to a "sodden pitch".)
Referee: Nomore Musundire (Zimbabwe)

14 December 2017
16:00

Uganda	0–0 (a.e.t.)	Lesotho
Penalties
G. Wasswa (penalty scored); K. Kagimu (penalty scored); J. Poloto (penalty scored); P. Obuya (penalty scored); A. Okello (penalty scored); M. Ogama (penalty missed)	5–6	(penalty scored) R. Mokokoane; (penalty scored) R. Mobane; (penalty scored) L. Nkune; (penalty scored) S. Tanki; (penalty scored) B. Mokhele; (penalty scored) R. Monaheng

Arthur Davies Stadium, Kitwe
Referee: Thando Helpus Ndzandzeka (South Africa)

=== Bronze medal match ===
16 December 2017

Egypt	3–1	Uganda
R. Ashraf 19', 59' A. Amir 90+1'		M. Shaban 44'

Arthur Davies Stadium, Kitwe
Referee: Stanley Hachiwa (Zambie)

=== Final ===
16 December 2017

South Africa	2–1	Lesotho
Lyle Foster 5' S. Sambo 40'		R. Mokokoane 59'

Arthur Davies Stadium, Kitwe
Referee: Abdoul Kanoso (Madagascar)
