= Swazi Charity Cup =

The Swazi Charity Cup or Swazi Telecom Charity Cup is the supercup tournament of the Swazi football.

== Winners ==
- 1992 : Denver Sundowns

=== Swazi Paper Mills Champion of Champions ===
- 1993 : Mbabane Swallows 5–0 Manzini Wanderers

=== Charity Cup ===
- 1996 : Eleven Men in Flight
- 1998 : Mbabane Highlanders 2–0 Mbabane Swallows
- 1999 : Mbabane Swallows (played in league format)
- 2000 : Denver Sundowns

=== Baphalali Charity Cup ===
- 2001 : Nkomazi Sundowns 2–0 Young Buffaloes FC

=== Swazi Telecom Charity Cup ===
- 2002 : Manzini Wanderers 1–1 Royal Leopards (aet, 5–3 pen.)
- 2003 : Manzini Wanderers 2–0 Mbabane Swallows
- 2004 : Mbabane Swallows 1–0 Mbabane Highlanders
- 2005 : Manzini Wanderers 1–0 Mbabane Highlanders
- 2006 : Royal Leopards 3–1 Mbabane Swallows
- 2007 : Mbabane Highlanders and Manzini Wanderers (abandoned at 2–0 in 75')
- 2008 : Mbabane Highlanders 0–0 Mbabane Swallows (aet, 5–4 pen.)
- 2009 : Moneni Pirates FC 2–1 Mbabane Highlanders
- 2010 : Mbabane Highlanders 1–0 Manzini Wanderers
- 2011 : Manzini Sundowns 2–1 Manzini Wanderers
- 2012 : Manzini Sundowns 1–0 Young Buffaloes FC
- 2013 : Royal Leopards 0–0 Young Buffaloes FC (aet, 4–1 pen.)
- 2014 : Mbabane Swallows 0–0 Royal Leopards (aet, 5–4 pen.)
- 2015 : Royal Leopards 1–0 Mbabane Swallows
- 2016 : Royal Leopards 2–0 Manzini Wanderers
- 2017: Mbabane Swallows 1–1 Royal Leopards (5–4 pen)
- 2018: Mbabane Swallows 2–1 Mbabane Highlanders
- 2019:
