= 2025 Africa Cup of Nations qualification Group I =

2025 AFCON qualifying group I

Group I of the 2025 Africa Cup of Nations qualification was one of twelve groups that decided the teams which qualified for the 2025 Africa Cup of Nations final tournament in Morocco. The group consisted of four teams: Mali, Mozambique, Guinea-Bissau and Eswatini.

The teams played against each other in a home-and-away round-robin format between September and November 2024.

Mali and Mozambique, the group winners and runners-up respectively, qualified for the 2025 Africa Cup of Nations.

== Standings ==
Pos	Team	Pld	W	D	L	GF	GA	GD	Pts	Qualification	Mali	Mozambique	Guinea-Bissau	Eswatini
1	Mali	6	4	2	0	10	1	+9	14	Final tournament	—	1–1	1–0	6–0
2	Mozambique	6	3	2	1	9	5	+4	11	Final tournament	0–1	—	2–1	1–1
3	Guinea-Bissau	6	1	2	3	4	6	−2	5		0–0	1–2	—	1–0
4	Eswatini	6	0	2	4	2	13	−11	2		0–1	0–3	1–1	—

Source: CAF
Rules for classification: Tiebreakers

== Matches ==
5 September 2024
16:00 UTC+0

Guinea-Bissau	1–0	Eswatini
Burá 14'	Report

Estádio 24 de Setembro, Bissau
Referee: Raphiou Ligali (Benin)
6 September 2024
19:00 UTC+0

Mali	1–1	Mozambique
Bissouma 52'	Report	Catamo 37'

Stade du 26 Mars, Bamako
Attendance: 49,000
Referee: Alhadi Allaou Mahamat (Chad)

10 September 2024
15:00 UTC+2

Eswatini	0–1	Mali
	Report	Bissouma 7'

Mbombela Stadium, Mbombela (South Africa)
Attendance: 406
Referee: Rulisa Patience Fidele (Rwanda)
10 September 2024
15:00 UTC+2

Mozambique	2–1	Guinea-Bissau
Guima 5'; Elias 73'	Report	Mam. Baldé 24'

Estádio do Zimpeto, Maputo
Referee: Mohamed Diraneh Guedi (Djibouti)

11 October 2024
15:00 UTC+2

Mozambique	1–1	Eswatini
Ratifo 73'	Report	Mavuso 80'

Estádio do Zimpeto, Maputo
Referee: Pierre Jean Nguiene (Congo)
11 October 2024
19:00 UTC+0

Mali	1–0	Guinea-Bissau
Touré 62'	Report

Stade du 26 Mars, Bamako
Referee: Samuel Uwikunda (Rwanda)

14 October 2024
21:00 UTC+2

Eswatini	0–3	Mozambique
	Report	Domingues 11'; Ratifo 41'; Catamo 59'

Mbombela Stadium, Mbombela (South Africa)
Referee: Ring Nyier (South Sudan)
15 October 2024
16:00 UTC+0

Guinea-Bissau	0–0	Mali
	Report

Estádio 24 de Setembro, Bissau
Referee: Jean Ouattara (Burkina Faso)

15 November 2024
17:00 UTC+2

Eswatini	1–1	Guinea-Bissau
Mkhonta 81' (pen.)	Report	Mané 87'

Mbombela Stadium, Mbombela (South Africa)
Referee: Abdou Abdel Mefire (Cameroon)
15 November 2024
17:00 UTC+2

Mozambique	0–1	Mali
	Report	K. Doumbia 19'

Estádio do Zimpeto, Maputo
Referee: Dickens Mimisa (Kenya)

19 November 2024
15:00 UTC+0

Mali	6–0	Eswatini
Touré 7'; Nene 17', 23', 76'; K. Doumbia 42'; M. Doumbia 89'	Report

Stade du 26 Mars, Bamako
Referee: Mohamed Ali Moussa (Niger)
19 November 2024
15:00 UTC+0

Guinea-Bissau	1–2	Mozambique
Beto 42'	Report	Langa 9'; Ratifo 52'

Estádio 24 de Setembro, Bissau
Referee: Joseph Odey Ogabor (Nigeria)

== Goalscorers ==
There were 25 goals scored in 12 matches, for an average of 2.08 goals per match.

3 goals

- (Mali) Dorgeles Nene
- (Mozambique) Stanley Ratifo

2 goals

- (Mali) Yves Bissouma
- (Mali) Kamory Doumbia
- (Mali) El Bilal Touré
- (Mozambique) Geny Catamo

1 goal

- (Eswatini) Thubelihle Mavuso
- (Eswatini) Lindo Mkhonta
- (Guinea-Bissau) Mama Baldé
- (Guinea-Bissau) Beto
- (Guinea-Bissau) Burá
- (Guinea-Bissau) Carlos Mané
- (Mali) Mamadou Doumbia
- (Mozambique) Domingues
- (Mozambique) Elias
- (Mozambique) Guima
- (Mozambique) Bruno Langa
