= 2025–26 Premier League of Eswatini =

Premier League of Eswatini
- Season: 2025–26
- Champions: Nsingizini Hotspurs
- Matches: 124
- Goals: 275 (2.22 per match)
- Biggest home win: Royal Leopards 4-0 Sisonkhe
- Biggest away win: Amawele 0-4 Royal Leopards; Sisonkhe 0-4 Mbabane Highlanders
- Highest scoring: Manzini Wanderers 1-4 Young Buffaloes; Royal Leopards 2-3 Moneni Pirates
- Longest winning run: Moneni Pirates (5 matches)
- Longest unbeaten run: Moneni Pirates (9 matches)
- Longest winless run: Manzini Wanderers (8 matches)
- Longest losing run: Sisonkhe (4 matches)
- All statistics correct as of 17 March 2026.

The 2025–26 Premier League of Eswatini is the 2025–26 season of the Premier League of Eswatini, the top-tier football league in Eswatini It was won by Nsingizini Hotspurs, who defended their title from the previous season.

The season started on 3 October 2025 and will conclude in May 2026.

The top scorer was Royal Leopard's Hleliso 'Muah' Gamedze, who scored 18 goals and earned E14 000 in prize money.

The bottom three clubs will be relegated, and the club finishing fourth-bottom will enter the playoffs.

== Teams ==
Prior to the start of the season, Illovo rebranded as Ubombo Sugar.

== League table ==
Pos	Team	Pld	W	D	L	GF	GA	GD	Pts	Qualification or relegation
1	Nsingizini Hotspurs (C, Q)	30	20	5	5	44	14	+30	65	Qualification for CAF Champions League
2	Manzini Sea Birds	30	17	5	8	48	28	+20	56	Qualification for CAF Confederation Cup
3	Young Buffaloes	30	16	6	8	43	23	+20	54	
4	Green Mamba	30	12	12	6	30	22	+8	48	
5	Mbabane Highlanders	30	12	10	8	40	29	+11	46	
6	Royal Leopards	30	11	11	8	51	37	+14	44	
7	Moneni Pirates	30	11	11	8	31	22	+9	44	
8	Mbabane Swallows	30	12	8	10	33	27	+6	44	
9	Tabankulu Celtics	30	12	5	13	34	32	+2	41	
10	Rangers	30	10	10	10	29	28	+1	40	
11	Ezulwini United	30	10	9	11	32	33	−1	39	
12	Ubombo Sugar	30	9	8	13	25	38	−13	35	
13	Amawele	30	8	8	14	24	37	−13	32	Qualification for National First Division play-offs
14	Malanti Chiefs (R)	30	7	9	14	20	37	−17	30	Relegation to National First Division
15	Sisonkhe (R)	30	7	6	17	21	48	−27	27	Relegation to National First Division
16	Manzini Wanderers (R)	30	2	5	23	17	67	−50	11	Relegation to National First Division

Source: Soccerway
Rules for classification: 1) Points; 2) Head-to-head points; 3) Head-to-head goal difference; 4) Head-to-head goals scored; 5) Goal difference; 6) Goals scored; 7) Play-off.
(C) Champions; (Q) Qualified for the phase indicated; (R) Relegated
