= Ingwenyama Cup =

- Founded: 2016
- Current champions: Royal Leopards

The Ingwenyama Cup is soccer tournament in Eswatini. The winner qualifies for the following season's CAF Confederation Cup. As of 2026, the winner received E1.45 million. As of 2025, sponsorship is E5 million annually, making it the country's richest club tournament. As of 2023–24, the top goalscorer earns E10 000

The cup is intended to celebrate the cultural heritage of Eswatini as well as showcase local football talent.

It was founded in 2019, but was not held from 2021 to 2023 due to the COVID-19 pandemic in Eswatini and its after-effects.

== Qualification ==
Prior to the 2025-26 season, the 32 teams in the Premier League of Eswatini and Eswatini National First Division qualified automatically. From the 2025-26 season, four regional representatives from the SMVAF Ingwenyama Cup Regionals are to be included, and the bottom eight National First Division teams will play in a preliminary playoff to qualify.

== Results ==
Finals
| Season | Winners | Score | Runners-up |
|---|---|---|---|
| 2016 | Mbabane Swallows | 2-0 | Royal Leopards |
| 2017 | Mbabane Swallows | 1-0 | Young Buffaloes |
| 2018 | Mbabane Swallows | 2-1 | Royal Leopards |
| 2019 | Young Buffaloes | 4-1 | Mbabane Highlanders |
| 2020 | Green Mamba | 2-0 | Mbabane Highlanders |
| 2024 | Green Mamba | 1-0 | Mbabane Swallows |
| 2025 | Royal Leopards | 1-0 | Moneni Pirates |
| 2026 | Nsingizini Hotspurs | 1-0 | Green Mamba |

=== Results by team ===
Results by team
| Club | Wins | First final won | Last final won | Runners-up | Last final lost | Total final appearances |
|---|---|---|---|---|---|---|
| Mbabane Swallows | 3 | 2016 | 2018 | 1 | 2024 | 4 |
| Green Mamba | 2 | 2020 | 2024 | 1 | 2026 | 3 |
| Royal Leopards | 1 | 2025 | 2025 | 2 | 2018 | 3 |
| Young Buffaloes | 1 | 2019 | 2019 | 1 | 2017 | 2 |
| Nsingizini Hotspurs | 1 | 2026 | 2026 | 0 | - | 1 |
| Mbabane Highlanders | 0 | - | - | 2 | 2020 | 2 |
| Moneni Pirates | 0 | - | - | 1 | 2025 | 1 |
