= Lucky Mhlathe =

South African soccer player (born 1980)

Personal information
- Full name: Josiah Lucky Mhlathe
- Date of birth: 16 February 1980 (age 46)
- Place of birth: Sebokeng, South Africa
- Height: 1.78 m (5 ft 10 in)
- Position: Midfielder

Senior career*
Years	Team	Apps	(Gls)
- Jomo Cosmos
- * Club domestic league appearances and goals

Josiah Lucky Mhlathe (born 16 February 1980) is a South African former professional soccer player who played as a midfielder for Jomo Cosmos.
