= Thibault Tchicaya =

Gabonese footballer

Personal information
- Full name: Thibault Charles Tchicaya
- Date of birth: 17 July 1983 (age 43)
- Place of birth: Makokou, Gabon
- Height: 1.72 m (5 ft 7 1/2 in)
- Position: Defender

Senior career*
Years	Team	Apps	(Gls)
2002–2003	Tout Puissant Akwembe	?	(?)
2004–2006	Delta Téléstar	?	(?)
2006–2008	Sogéa	?	(?)
2009	Mbabane Swallows		(?)
2010	Missile	9	(1)
2011	AGMK	25	(1)

International career
2003–2007	Gabon	10	(0)
- * Club domestic league appearances and goals

Thibault Tchicaya (born 17 July 1983) is a Gabon international footballer who plays as a defender who plays for Missile.

== Career ==
Born in Makokou, Tchicaya has played in his native Gabon for Tout Puissant Akwembe, Delta Téléstar, Sogéa FC and Missile FC. At age 30, he signed with Mbabane Swallows F.C. of Swaziland on a six-month contract in January 2009.

Tchicaya has made several appearances for the Gabon national football team. He played for the side the finished third at the 2005 CEMAC Cup.
