= Salam Atilola =

Nigerian footballer (born 1996)

Salami Atilola
Personal information
- Full name: Atilola Abdulsalam Tunde
- Date of birth: February 2, 1996 (age 30)
- Place of birth: Saki, Nigeria
- Height: 1.80 m (5 ft 11 in)
- Position: Striker

Youth career
- 2008-2012: Karamone

Senior career*
Years	Team	Apps	(Gls)
2012–2013	Crown	13	(2)
2013–2014	Shooting Stars F.C.	19	(0)
2014–2015	MFM FC	25	(1)
2016–2018	Manzini Sundowns F.C.	29	(3)
2019–	Abia Warriors F.C.	26	(3)
- * Club domestic league appearances and goals as of 17 February 2020

Salam Atilola(born 2 February 1996) who has short playing time with Crown, Shooting Stars F.C., MFM FC all in Nigeria National League except Abia Warriors F.C. in the Nigeria First division who later sacked him on poor performance. Atilola Abdulsalam Tunde who joined Abia Warriors in the Nigeria Premier League season February 2019 mid-season window transfer registered only 3 goals from 8 games in 2018/19 season. He was sacked the following season 2019/20 from Abia Warriors F.C. in January after un-impressive performance playing 15 games without a goal as a striker.

== Career ==
Salam Atilola is a natural left footed striker. He was discovered by Karamone. He started his professional league football debut with Crown in 2012/13 season but later sacked and then signed by Shooting Stars in 2013/14 after he was sacked. He also played for MFM in the Nigeria Second division league 2014–15 season and was later also sacked after average performance.
