= Mhlambanyatsi Rovers F.C. =

Football club in western Eswatini

Mhlambanyatsi Rovers FC
- Full name: Mhlambanyatsi Rovers Football Club
- Nickname: Sibaya Esikhulu
- Ground: Bhunya Stadium (capacity 2,000) Mhlambanyatsi, Eswatini
Home colours	Away colours

Mhlambanyatsi Rovers is an Eswatinian association football club based in Mhlambanyatsi, which last played in the Swazi Premier League in the 2010–11 season.

== Achievements ==
- Swazi Premier League: 1

2004

- Swazi Cup: 1

1995

== Performance in CAF competitions ==
- CAF Champions League: 1 appearance

2005 – Preliminary Round

- CAF Cup: 1 appearance

1996 – First Round
