= Nsingizini Hotspurs F.C. =

Nsingizini Hotspurs FC
- Full name: Nsingizini Hotspurs Football Club
- Nicknames: Insingizi Yezulu; Umgugudla Lomkhulu
- Founded: 1984
- Ground: King Sobhuza II Memorial Stadium
- Capacity: 2,000
- Manager: Mandla David Qhogi
- League: Premier League of Eswatini
- 2025–26: Premier League of Eswatini, 1st of 16 (champions)
- Website: https://www.facebook.com/p/Nsingizini-Hotspurs-FC-100067953977567/
Home colours	Away colours	Third colours

Nsingizini Hotspurs is an Eswatini association football club based in the Shiselweni Region, Hluthi, Nsingizini near the Lavumisa border that connects Eswatini to KwaZulu-Natal in South Africa. The club competes in the Premier League of Eswatini, the top flight of Eswatini football. Formed in 1984 by the community of Nsingizini, the club was originally playing stokvels (community tournaments) and used to develop and promote talent for Premier League of Eswatini teams. The club’s nickname ‘Insingizi Yezulu’ originates from the name of a bird ‘Southern ground-hornbill’. The club currently plays its matches at the 2,000-seat King Sobhuza II Memorial Stadium.

== History ==
Hotspurs won the league title for the first time in 2024–25 under interim coach Simon Ngomane, and appointed Mandla David Qhogi for the new season.

In 2026, Hotspurs won the treble, winning the Trade Fair Cup, the Ingwenyama Cup for the first time, defeating Green Mamba 1-0 in the final, and retaining their league title, winning the 2025–26 Premier League.

== Honours ==
Premier League of Eswatini

- Champions: 2024–25, 2025–26

Ingwenyama Cup

- Winners: 2026

MTN Momo Cup

- Winners: 2023–24

Trade Fair Cup

- Winners: 2025–26

== International competitions ==
The following is a list of results for Nsingizini Hotspurs FC in international competitions. Nsingizini Hotspurs FC’s scores are listed first.

Year	Tournament	Round	Opponent	Home	Away	Agg.
2024–25	CAF Confederation Cup	Qualifying Rounds	(South Africa) Stellenbosch	0–3	0–5	0–8
2025–26	CAF Champions League	Qualifying Rounds	Simba S.C.	0-3	0-0	0-3

Kit suppliers and shirt sponsors
Period	Kit supplier	Shirt sponsor (chest)	Shirt sponsor (sleeve)
2023–2024	Primo	Embiveni Meats	No Sponsor
2024–present	Primo	Embiveni Meats	Macsteel Eswatini

=== League record ===
==== Premier League ====
- 2022–23 – 6th
- 2023–24 – 3rd
- 2024–25 – 1st (champions)
- 2025–26 – 1st (champions)
