= Football in Eswatini =

- Country: Eswatini
- Governing body: Eswatini Football Association
- National team: Men's national team
- Clubs: Swazi Premier League

International competitions
- Champions League; CAF Confederation Cup; Super Cup; FIFA Club World Cup; FIFA World Cup(National Team); African Cup of Nations(National Team)

The sport of football (soccer) in the country of Eswatini (formerly Swaziland) is run by the Eswatini Football Association. The association administers the national football team, as well as the Premier League. Soccer is the most popular sport in the country.

League competitions include the top tier Premier League of Eswatini, and cup competitions include the Ingwenyama Cup (the richest club competition in the country), the MoMo Cup and the Swazibank Cup.

== Eswatini stadiums ==
Stadium	Capacity	City
Somhlolo National Stadium	<10,000	Lobamba

== Attendances ==
The average attendance per top-flight football league season and the club with the highest average attendance:

Season	League average	Best club	Best club average
2024-25	508	Mbabane Swallows	1,105

Source: League page on Wikipedia
