= Mhlambanyatsi =

Coordinates: 26°27′S 31°01′E

Mhlambanyatsi is a town in western Eswatini. It is located 18 kilometres southwest of the capital, Mbabane.
