= Mhlume United F.C. =

Mhlume United FC
- Full name: Mhlume United Football Club
- Dissolved: 2005
- Ground: Mhlume Stadium; Mhlume, Eswatini
- Capacity: 10,000

Mhlume United Football Club is a defunct Eswatinii soccer club based in Mhlume. It played in the Premier League of Eswatini.

== History ==
The team was founded by merging two teams Mhlume Peacemakers and Mhlume FC. In 1981 Mhlume Peacemakers has won the Swazi Premier League. In 2005 the club was dissolved by merging with Simunye FC to create a new club RSSC United FC.

== Stadium ==
Currently the team plays at the Mhlume Stadium.

== Honours ==
- Swazi Premier League

Champion (1): 1981

- Swazi Cup

Winner (1): 2000
