= Vovovo FC =

Liswati football club

- Full name: Vovovo Football Club
- Ground: Killarney Sports Field
- Capacity: 1,500
- League: National First Division
- Website: https://www.facebook.com/Vovovo-FC-103593868303823/

Vovovo FC is a Liswati football club based in Piggs Peak which currently plays in the National First Division, the second-tier competition in the country. The team plays its home matches at the 1,500-capacity Killarney Sports Field.

== History ==
Vovovo FC played in the Premier League of Eswatini through the 2018–19 season, following which the team was relegated to the National First Division.
