= Eleven Men in Flight F.C. =

Association football club in Eswatini

Eleven Men in Flight FC
- Full name: Eleven Men in Flight Football Club
- Nickname: Easy By Night
- Founded: 1965; 61 years ago
- Ground: Mhlume Stadium; Siteki, Eswatini
- Capacity: 10,000
- Manager: Frank Maziya
- League: Premier League of Eswatini
Home colours	Away colours

Eleven Men in Flight is an Eswatini soccer club based in Siteki.

== Achievements ==
- Premier League of Eswatini: 2

1994, 1996

- Swazi Cup: 2

1993, 2001

- Swazi Charity Cup: 1

1996

- Swazi Challenge Cup: 3

1993, 1996, 2001

== Performance in CAF competitions ==
- African Cup of Champions Clubs: 1 appearance

1995 – First Round

- CAF Cup: 1 appearance

1996 – Preliminary Round

- CAF Cup Winners' Cup: 2 appearances

1994 – Second Round
1997 – First Round
