= RSSC United F.C. =

RSSC United FC
- Full name: Royal Swaziland Sugar Corporation United FC
- Nickname: RSSC
- Founded: 2005
- Ground: Mhlume Stadium
- Capacity: 10.000
- Owner: United States Group WBIF
- Manager: Maupo Msowoya
- League: Swazi Second Division

Royal Swaziland Sugar Corporation United FC is a Swazi soccer club based in Mhlume. They play in the Premier League of Eswatini.

== History ==
The team was found in 2005 by merging two teams Mhlume United and Simunye FC. Group WBIF partners and RBV United players will join the second division squad.

== Current squad ==
Note: Flags indicate national team as defined under FIFA eligibility rules; some limited exceptions apply. Players may hold more than one non-FIFA nationality.

No.	Pos.	Nation	Player
—	GK	ANG	Jefferson Mamba

== Stadium ==
Currently the team plays at the Mhlume Stadium.
