= Midas Mbabane City F.C. =

Midas
- Full name: Midas City FC
- Ground: Somhlolo National Stadium; Lobamba, Eswatini
- Capacity: 20,000
- League: Premier League of Eswatini
- 2017–2018: 14th

Midas Mbabane City FC is an Eswatini soccer club based in Mbabane. They were relegated from the Premier League of Eswatini in 2017–18.

== Stadium ==
Currently the team plays at the 20000 capacity Somhlolo National Stadium.
