= Umbelebele Jomo Cosmos F.C. =

Umbelebele
- Full name: Umbelebele Jomo Cosmos FC
- Ground: Prince of Wales Stadium
- Capacity: 1,000
- League: Swazi First Division

Umbelebele Jomo Cosmos FC is a Swazi soccer club based in Mbabane. They play in the Swazi First Division.

== Stadium ==
Currently the team plays at the 1000 capacity Prince of Wales Stadium.
