= Mavuso Sports Centre =

Stadium in Manzini, Eswatini

Coordinates: 26°29′27″S 31°22′27″E

- Interactive map of Mavuso Sports Centre
- Full name: Mavuso Sports Centre
- Location: Manzini, Eswatini
- Capacity: 5,000

Tenants
- Moneni Pirates; Eswatini national football team

Mavuso Sports Centre is a multi-use stadium in Manzini, Eswatini. It is currently used mostly for football matches.

The stadium has a capacity of 5,000 spectators. Also known as Trade Fair Ground, it is also used for traditional events such as king's birthday ceremonies. A new stadium has been proposed to replace it soon. Once the new stadium is completed, Trade Fair Ground will be demolished.
