= Eswatini National First Division =

National First Division
- Organising body: Eswatini Football Association
- Country: Eswatini
- Confederation: CAF
- Number of clubs: 16
- Level on pyramid: 2
- Promotion to: Premier League of Eswatini
- Relegation to: Regional Super Leagues
- Domestic cup: Ingwenyama Cup
- Current champions: Red Rhinos (2025–26)
- Website: Website

The National First Division, also known as the MTN National First Division for sponsorship reasons, is the second-tier league of football in Eswatini, operating under the auspices of the Eswatini Football Association.

== Organization ==
From the 2025–26 Premier League of Eswatini, the top two performing clubs in the National First Division earn automatic spots in the Premier League of Eswatini the following season while the bottom three performers in the top flight are automatically relegated. The third, fourth and fifth best clubs in the First Division compete in a play-off against the fourth lowest performers of the Premier League, with the top two competing in the following season's Premier League. This format was expanded when the Premier League increased to sixteen teams prior to the 2025–26 season. Prior to an October 2021 rule amendment, there were no play-offs and the top and bottom two clubs were automatically promoted/relegated only.

Previously, the four lowest-ranked teams in the league were automatically relegated to their Regional Super Leagues while the champion of each Super League joined the National First Division the following season.

== Sponsorship ==
Until the end of 2024–25 season, the league was sponsored by the MTN Group which also sponsored the Premier League. As of 2024, the league winners after the first round earn a prize of E50 000. That year, it was announced that the league was searching for a new sponsor, or another joint-sponsor, so that the prize money could be increased after a public outcry over the existing amount of E180 000 for the season winners.

From the 2025-26 season, MulaSport sponsored the league, committing E4.5 million over the following three years.

== List of winners ==
This list is incomplete.

Season	Champions	Ref.
2024–25	Malanti Chiefs	
2025–26	Red Rhinos	
