= Manzini Sea Birds F.C. =

Sea Birds
- Full name: Manzini Sea Birds Football Club
- Nickname: Birds
- Founded: 1987
- Ground: Mavuso Sports Centre; Manzini, Eswatini
- Capacity: 5,000
- Chairman: Peter Simelane (2013)
- League: Premier League of Eswatini
- 2025–26: Premier League of Eswatini, 2nd of 16

Manzini Sea Birds FC is an Eswatini association football club based in Manzini.

== History ==
The club was founded 1987. For most of its history, the Seabirds played in the Swazi First Division, but was promoted to the Premier League of Eswatini in 2012.

In 2018, they won the First Division title to earn another top-flight promotion. Star forward Muzi Tsabedze tied for the league's top scorer and earned player of the year honors.

The team finished second in the 2025–26 season, their highest league finish to date.

== Stadium ==
The team plays its home matches at the 5000 capacity Mavuso Sports Centre.

== Notable players ==
Below is a list of notable players who have earned international caps while playing with the club.

- Victor Khoza
- Banele Mdluli
- Ndumiso Shongwe
- Muzi Tsabedze

== Notable coaches ==
- Van Royen Magagula (2013)
- Sihle Mavimbela (2013)
- Zenzele 'Ace' Dlamini (2014)

== Youth academy ==
Since 2011 the club holds with the Ishibobo Soccer Academy (ISA), a talent scouting sports academy in Manzini. ISA serves as the under-20 football team of the club. Ishibobo plays its home matches at the Zakhele Sports Ground.
