= Eswatini Football Association =

Governing body of football in Eswatini

CAF
- Short name: EFA
- Founded: 1968
- Headquarters: Mbabane
- FIFA affiliation: 1978
- CAF affiliation: 1976
- President: Peter Simelane
- Website: www.nfas.org.sz

The Eswatini Football Association (EFA), formerly known as the National Football Association of Swaziland (NFAS), is the governing body of football in Eswatini. It was founded in 1968, and affiliated to FIFA in 1978 and to CAF in 1976. It organizes the national football league and the national team.

The EFA adopted its current name on 1 July 2018, during the ordinary general assembly of the national football association at the Sibane Hotel. On 11 September, the EFA announced that it will hold an event to unveil its new branding, including a new logo.
