= Manzini Wanderers F.C. =

Manzini Wanderers FC
- Full name: Manzini Wanderers Football Club
- Nickname: Liweseli
- Founded: 1957
- Ground: Manzini Trade Fair Sports Ground; Manzini, Eswatini
- Capacity: 5000
- Manager: Gcina Dlamini
- League: Eswatini National First Division
- 2025-26: Premier League of Eswatini, 16th of 16 (relegated)
Home colours	Away colours

Manzini Wanderers is a Eswatini association football club based in Manzini. It is one of the oldest premier league teams in the kingdom of Eswatini, that competes in the Eswatini National First Division, the second tier of Liswati football. The club has won the league six times, Swazi Cup once, six times the Swazi Trade fair Cup and 3 times the Swazi Charity Cup. The club has been a mainstay of Swazi football for a long time and it is considered amongst the biggest teams in the country.

== History ==
The football club was founded in 1957 and was called Shooting Stars by the founding members, all players at the time, including Raphael 'Four-four' Nxumalo, Bruno Magongo, Sihhodlane Dlamini, Pat Fakudze and Sam Dlamini. In 1959, the name of the football club was changed to Manzini Wanderers due to the influence of England-based Wolverhampton Wanderers F.C. The football club wears a maroon and white outfit.

The club was relegated at the end of the 2023–24 season. However, the club contested the relegation on the grounds that rivals Denver Sundowns had fielded an invalid player. With legal proceedings underway, the club did not play at all in the following season before being reinstated in the 2025–26 season.

== Achievements ==
- Swazi Premier League: 6

1983, 1985, 1987, 1999, 2002, 2003.

- Swazi Cup: 1

1984.

- Swazi Charity Cup: 3

2002, 2003, 2005.

- Swazi Trade Fair Cup: 6

1984, 1985, 1986, 1993, 1996, 2000.

== Performance in CAF competitions ==
- African Cup of Champions Clubs: 3 appearances

1984 – Preliminary Round
1986 – Preliminary Round
1988 – First Round

- CAF Cup Winners' Cup: 1 appearance

1985 – First Round
