= Denver Sundowns F.C. =

Eswatini football club

Manzini Sundowns FC
- Full name: Manzini Sundowns Football Club
- Founded: 1985
- Ground: Manzini Trade Fair Sports Ground; Manzini, Eswatini
- Capacity: 5,000
- Chairman: Henry DuPont
- Manager: Rodwell Dhlakama
- League: Eswatini National First Division
- 2024-2025: 5th
Home colours	Away colours

Denver Sundowns is an Eswatini soccer club based in Manzini. From 2005 to 2020, the team was known as Manzini Sundowns.

== Achievements ==
- Swazi Premier League: 2

1989, 1990.

- Swazi Cup: 3

1988, 1991, 1992.

- Swazi Charity Cup: 4

1992, 2000, 2011, 2012.

- Swazi Trade Fair Cup: 4

1990, 1992, 1998, 2006.

== Current squad ==
Note: Flags indicate national team as defined under FIFA eligibility rules; some limited exceptions apply. Players may hold more than one non-FIFA nationality.

No.	Pos.	Nation	Player
-	GK	SWZ	Linoh Magagula
-	GK	SWZ	Mkhulisi Thokozani
18	DF	SWZ	Phumlani Dlamini
13	FW	NGA	Atilola Abdulsalam Tunde
