= Young Buffaloes F.C. =

Young Buffalos FC
- Full name: Young Buffalos Football Club
- Founded: 1982; 44 years ago
- Ground: Trade Fair Ground, Manzini
- Capacity: 5,000
- League: Premier League of Eswatini
- 2025–26: Premier League of Eswatini, 3rd of 16
Home colours	Away colours

Young Buffalos FC is a Swazi association football club based in Matsapha.

== Achievements ==
- Premier League of Eswatini: 2

2010, 2020

- Ingwenyama Cup:

2019

- Swazi Cup: 3

2017, 2018, 2019

- Swazi Charity Cup: 0

Runners-up 2001, 2012, 2013

== Performance in CAF competitions ==
- CAF Champions League: 1 appearance

2011 – First Round

- CAF Confederation Cup: 5 appearances

2018 – Preliminary Round
2019 – Preliminary Round
2020 – First Round
2021 – Play-off Round
2022 – First Round
