= Malanti Chiefs F.C. =

Malanti Chiefs FC
- Full name: Malanti Chiefs Football Club
- Ground: Rocklands Stadium, Piggs Peak, Eswatini
- Chairman: Dumisani Gumede
- League: Eswatini National First Division
- 2025-26: Premier League of Eswatini, 14th of 16 (relegated)
Home colours	Away colours

Malanti Chiefs is a Eswatini association football club based in Piggs Peak.

== Achievements ==
- Swazi Cup: 1

2008

== Performance in CAF competitions ==
- CAF Confederation Cup: 1 appearance

2009 – First Round
