= Premier League of Eswatini =

Top football division in Eswatini

- Founded: 1971; 55 years ago
- Country: Eswatini
- Confederation: CAF
- Number of clubs: 16 teams
- Level on pyramid: 1
- Relegation to: National First Division
- Domestic cup(s): Swazibank Cup, MoMo Cup, Ingwenyama Cup
- International cup(s): Champions League; Confederation Cup
- Current champions: Nsingizini Hotspurs (2025–26)
- Most championships: Mbabane Highlanders (13)
- Top scorer: (Eswatini) Felix Badenhorst (101 goals)
- Website: www.pls.co.sz
- Current: 2026–27 Premier League of Eswatini

The Premier League of Eswatini, also known as the MTN Premier League for sponsorship reasons, is the top division of the Eswatini Football Association. It consists of 16 teams.

It was created in 1971. In 2014, the league adopted "Vision 2022" and planned to be a fully professional entity by 2022. However, the COVID-19 pandemic in Eswatini impacted the 2019–20 and 2020–21 seasons.

== Previous winners ==
- 1971 : Milling Hotspurs
- 1972 : Milling Hotspurs
- 1973 : not known
- 1974 : Mbabane Highlanders
- 1976 : Mbabane Highlanders
- 1977 : Juventus Kvaluseni (Mhlume)
- 1980 : Mbabane Highlanders
- 1981 : Mhlume Peacemakers (Mhlume)
- 1982 : Mbabane Highlanders
- 1983 : Manzini Wanderers
- 1984 : Mbabane Highlanders
- 1985 : Manzini Wanderers
- 1986 : Mbabane Highlanders
- 1987 : Manzini Wanderers
- 1988 : Mbabane Highlanders
- 1989 : Denver Sundowns (Manzini)
- 1990 : Denver Sundowns (Manzini)
- 1991 : Mbabane Highlanders
- 1992 : Mbabane Highlanders
- 1993 : Mbabane Swallows
- 1994 : Eleven Men in Flight (Siteki)
- 1995 : Mbabane Highlanders
- 1996 : Eleven Men in Flight (Siteki)
- 1997 : Mbabane Highlanders
- 1998 : no championship
- 1998–99 : Manzini Wanderers
- 1999–00 : Mbabane Highlanders
- 2000–01 : Mbabane Highlanders
- 2001–02 : Manzini Wanderers
- 2002–03 : Manzini Wanderers
- 2003–04 : Mhlambanyatsi Rovers
- 2004–05 : Mbabane Swallows
- 2005–06 : Royal Leopards
- 2006–07 : Royal Leopards
- 2007–08 : Royal Leopards
- 2008–09 : Mbabane Swallows
- 2009–10 : Young Buffaloes
- 2010–11 : Green Mamba
- 2011–12 : Mbabane Swallows
- 2012–13 : Mbabane Swallows
- 2013–14 : Royal Leopards
- 2014–15 : Royal Leopards
- 2015–16 : Royal Leopards
- 2016–17 : Mbabane Swallows
- 2017–18 : Mbabane Swallows
- 2018–19 : Green Mamba
- 2019–20 : Young Buffaloes
- 2020–21 : Royal Leopards
- 2021–22 : Royal Leopards
- 2022–23 : Green Mamba
- 2023–24 : Mbabane Swallows
- 2024–25 : Nsingizini Hotspurs
- 2025–26 : Nsingizini Hotspurs

== Qualification for CAF competitions ==
=== Association ranking for the 2025–26 CAF club season ===
The association ranking for the 2025–26 CAF Champions League and the 2025–26 CAF Confederation Cup will be based on results from each CAF club competition from 2020–21 to the 2024–25 season.

Legend

- CL: CAF Champions League
- CC: CAF Confederation Cup
- ≥: Associations points might increase on basis of its clubs performance in 2024–25 CAF club competitions
- Associations ranked 1–12 are eligible to enter two teams in each CAF club competition.

Rank			Association	2020–21 (× 1)		2021–22 (× 2)		2022–23 (× 3)		2023–24 (× 4)		2024–25 (× 5)		Total
2025	2024	Mvt	Association	CL	CC	CL	CC	CL	CC	CL	CC	CL	CC	Total
1	1	—	Egypt	8	3	7	4	8	2.5	7	7	10	4	190.5
2	2	—	Morocco	4	6	9	5	8	2	2	4	5	5	142
3	4	+1	South Africa	8	2	5	4	4	3	4	1.5	9	3	131
4	3	-1	Algeria	6	5	7	1	6	5	2	3	5	5	130
5	6	+1	Tanzania	3	0.5	0	2	3	4	6	0	2	4	82.5
6	5	-1	Tunisia	4	3	5	1	4	2	6	1	3	0.5	82.5
7	8	+1	Angola	1	0	5	0	2	0	3	1.5	2	2	55
8	7	-1	DR Congo	4	0	0	3	1	2	4	0	2	0	45
9	9	—	Sudan	3	0	3	0	3	0	2	0	3	0	41
10	11	+1	Ivory Coast	0	0	0	1	0	3	3	0	1	2	38
11	10	-1	Libya	0	0.5	0	5	0	0.5	0	3	0	0	24
12	12	—	Nigeria	0	2	0	0	0	2	0	2	0	1	21
13	15	+2	Mali	0	0	0	0	0	1	0	2	1	0.5	18.5
14	14	—	Ghana	0	0	0	0	0	0	1	3	0	0	16
15	13	-2	Guinea	2	0	1	0	2	0	0	0.5	0	0	12
16	19	+3	Botswana	0	0	1	0	0	0	1	0	0	0.5	8.5
17	21	+4	Senegal	1	2	0	0	0	0	0	0	0	1	8
18	17	-1	Mauritania	0	0	0	0	0	0	2	0	0	0	8
19	18	-1	Congo	0	0	0	1	0	1	0	0.5	0	0	7
20	16	-4	Cameroon	0	3	0	0.5	1	0	0	0	0	0	7
21	22	+1	Togo	0	0	0	0	0	1	0	0	0	0	3
22	22	—	Uganda	0	0	0	0	1	0	0	0	0	0	3
23	-	new	Mozambique	0	0	0	0	0	0	0	0	0	0.5	2.5
24	20	-4	Zambia	0	1.5	0	0.5	0	0	0	0	0	0	2.5
25	24	-1	Eswatini	0	0	0	0.5	0	0	0	0	0	0	1
25	24	-1	Niger	0	0	0	0.5	0	0	0	0	0	0	1
27	26	-1	Burkina Faso	0	0.5	0	0	0	0	0	0	0	0	0.5

== Performance by club ==
Club	City	Titles	Last title
Mbabane Highlanders	Mbabane	13	2000–01
Royal Leopards	Matsapha	8	2021-22
Mbabane Swallows	Mbabane	8	2023–24
Manzini Wanderers	Manzini	6	2002–03
Green Mamba	Matsapha	3	2022–23
Manzini Sundowns (as Denver Sundowns)	Manzini	2	1990
Eleven Men in Flight	Siteki	2	1996
Milling Hotspurs	Manzini	2	1972
Nsingizini Hotspurs	Hluti	2	2025–26
Young Buffaloes	Matsapha	2	2019–20
Juventus Kvaluseni	Mhlume	1	1977
Mhlume Peacemakers	Mhlume	1	1981
Mhlambanyatsi Rovers	Mhlambanyatsi	1	2003–04

== Top goalscorers ==
Season	Top scorer	Team	Goals
2000–01	Fritz Junior Seilbea	Mbabane Swallows	13
2002–03	(Eswatini) Patrick "Nkola" Mkhwanazi	Manzini Wanderers	13
2003–04	(Eswatini) Salebona "Salas" Jele	Young Buffaloes	11
2004–05	(Eswatini) Mzwandile "Zoo" Mamba	Mbabane Swallows	12
2005–06	(Eswatini) Mzwandile "Zoo" Mamba (Eswatini) Mduduzi "Aghahowa" Mdluli	Royal Leopards; Mbabane Highlanders	11
2011–12	(Eswatini) Nhlanhla "Mshengu" Kunene	Malanti Chiefs	17
2012–13	(Eswatini) Nhlanhla "Mshengu" Kunene	Malanti Chiefs	14
2013–14	(Eswatini) Sandile Hlatshwako	Malanti Chiefs	14
2021-22	(Eswatini) Sandile Gamedze	Young Buffaloes	23
2022-23	(Eswatini) Felix Badenhorst	Mbabane Swallows	20
2023-24	(Eswatini) Sabelo Ndzinisa	Green Mamba	20
2024-25	(Eswatini) Sabelo Ndzinisa	Green Mamba	18
2025-26	(Eswatini) Hleliso 'Muah' Gamedze	Royal Leopards	18

== Sponsorship and prize money ==
As of 2025, the league is sponsored by MTN Eswatini, with a first prize of E1.1 million. This is the fifth highest in the Southern African region.
