= Royal Leopards F.C. =

Royal Leopards FC
- Full name: Royal Leopards Football Club
- Nickname: Ingwe Mabalabala
- Founded: 1979
- Ground: Police Camp; Matsapha, Eswatini
- Capacity: 5,000
- League: Premier League of Eswatini
- 2025–26: Premier League of Eswatini, 6th of 16
Home colours	Away colours

Royal Leopards Football Club is an Eswatini association football club based in Simunye. It is the Royal Eswatini Police team.

Leopards won the Ingwenyama Cup for the first time in 2025.

== Achievements ==
- Premier League of Eswatini: 8

2006, 2007, 2008, 2014, 2015, 2016, 2020-21, 2021-22.

- Ingwenyama Cup

2025

- Swazi Cup: 3

2007, 2011, 2014.

- Swazi Charity Cup: 4

2006, 2013, 2015, 2016.

- Swazi Trade Fair Cup: 1

2004.

== Performance in CAF competitions ==
- CAF Champions League: 4 appearances

2007 – Preliminary Round
2008 – Preliminary Round
2009 – Preliminary Round
2022 - Second Round

- CAF Confederation Cup: 3 appearances

2012 – Second Round
2015 - Second Round
2022 - Group Stage

- CAF Cup: 1 appearance

1999 – First Round
