= Green Mamba F.C. =

Green Mamba FC
- Full name: Green Mamba Football Club
- Nickname: "Mabonahlonishwe"
- Founded: 1987; 39 years ago
- League: Premier League of Eswatini
- 2025–26: Premier League of Eswatini, 4th of 16
Home colours	Away colours

Green Mamba is a association football club based in Manzini-Matsapha, Eswatini. They have appeared in the CAF Champions league twice, 2001 against Zanaco and Ferraviaro and in 2012 in Zimbabwe against FC Platinum.

== History ==
Green Mamba qualified for the 2026–27 CAF Confederation Cup by finishing runners-up in the 2026 Ingwenyama Cup. The club was forced to play their first-round tie against C.D. Primeiro de Agosto as one of five games in four days at the start of the season.

== Achievements ==
- Trade Fair Cup-2001/2003/2004
- Premier League of Eswatini: 3

2011, 2019, 2023

- Ingwenyama Cup:

2020, 2024

- Swazi Bank Cup: 2

2004, 2012

== Performance in CAF competitions ==
- CAF Champions League: 2 appearances

2012 –
2020 – Preliminary round

- CAF Confederation Cup: 1 appearance

2026–27 – First round
