= Moneni Pirates F.C. =

Moneni Pirates FC
- Full name: Moneni Pirates Football Club
- Nicknames: Buccaneers, Bhakajuju
- Founded: 16 September 1967
- Ground: Mavuso Sports Centre; Manzini, Eswatini
- Capacity: 5 000
- Chairman: Thulani Xaba
- League: Premier League of Eswatini
- 2025–26: Premier League of Eswatini, 7th of 16
Home colours	Away colours

Moneni Pirates FC is an Eswatini association football club based in Manzini. They play in the top division in Swazi football, the Premier League of Eswatini. The team plays in white and black colours.

== History ==
The club was established by Ngungunyane Matsenjwa, with an aim of bringing together youths of Moneni township in the outskirts of Manzini.

Prior to the club being taken over by Matsenjwa, it was known as The Blue Birds Football Club. In 1967, the club's name changed to Moneni Pirates FC, inspired by Soweto giants Orlando Pirates.

Many clubs in Eswatini are named after popular South African clubs because Swazi football fans follow South African leagues and local clubs aim to export talent to the more professional Premier Soccer League.

The club has been relegated from the highest league in then-Swaziland three times – in the 1998–99, 2005–06, and 2014–15 seasons. It quickly regained promotion each time, including a 2nd position finish in the National First Division in the 2016/17 season.

Following a tough 2023/24 season, Moneni Pirates announced major leadership changes, with businessman Thulani Xaba taking over as club president. He succeeded legal practitioner Osborne Nzima, who had led the club for over five years.

== Stadium ==
Currently the team plays at the 5,000 capacity Mavuso Sports Centre in Manzini.

== Performance in Caf competitions ==
- 1989 African Cup Winners' Cup: first round

== Honours ==
- Swazi Bank Cup: 2015
- Swazi Telecom Charity Cup: 2009
- Trade Fair Cup: 2001
- Inyatsi Top-8: 1995
- BP Cup: 1992
- Interboard (Trade Fair) Cup: 1992
- BP Cup: 1989

== Managers ==
- Christopher Ennin (Aug 2024 - Dec 2024)
- Gcina Dlamini (2019/20)
- Zenzele Dlamini (2016/17)
- Mlamuli Zwane (2015/16 & 2016/17)
- Happy Simfukwe (2014/15)
- Golding Dube (2014/15)
- Van Rooyen Magagula (2013/14)
- Zenzele Dlamini (2005/06, 2012/13 – last 5 games; 2013/14 – first round & 2014–15 – Assistant Coach from January 2015)
- Harries Bulunga (2012/13)
- Dumisa Mahlalela (2003, 2006/07 & 2011/12)
- Mlamuli Zwane (2008/09 – 2010/11)
- Sipho Sibandze (2002/03 – 2003/04)
- Christopher Khoza (1999/2000 & 2001/2002)
- David "Botsotso" Manyatsi (2000/01)
- Jan Simulambo (1998/99)
- Mandla Dlamini (1997/98)
- Nino Mahel (1996/97)
