= Mbabane Swallows F.C. =

Mbabane Swallows
- Full name: Mbabane Swallows Football Club
- Nickname: Umkhonto Kashaka
- Founded: 1948
- Ground: Somhlolo National Stadium, Lobamba, Eswatini
- Capacity: 20,000
- Chairman: Lloyd Maziya
- League: Premier League of Eswatini
- 2025–26: Premier League of Eswatini, 8th of 16
Home colours	Away colours

Mbabane Swallows Football Club is a Eswatini association football club based in Mbabane. The club was established in 1948. It was the first Eswatini club to participate in the CAF Champions League, when they did it in 2018. Mbabane Swallows regularly play home games in front of thousands of spectators.

== Achievements ==
- Premier League of Eswatini: 8

1993, 2005, 2009, 2012, 2012–13, 2016–17, 2017–18, 2023–24.

- Ingwenyama Cup:

2016, 2017, 2018

- Swazi Cup: 4

1986, 2006, 2013, 2016.

- Swazi Charity Cup: 6

1993, 1999, 2004, 2014, 2017, 2018

- Swazi League Cup: 6

1997, 1999, 2007, 2016, 2017, 2018

- Swazi top 8 Cup:

2013,2015,2016

- PLS Ultimate Cup: 1

2012

- King Mswati III Cup: 1

2015

- Mbabane Mayoral Cup (Town Century celebration): 1

2002

== Performance in CAF competitions ==
- CAF Champions League: 10 appearances

1998 – Preliminary round
2006 – Preliminary round
2010 – Preliminary round
2013 – Preliminary round
2014 – Preliminary round
2015 – Preliminary round
2016 – Preliminary round
2018 – Group stage
2018–19 – Preliminary round
2024–25 – Second round

- African Cup of Champions Clubs: 1 appearance

1994 – Preliminary round

- CAF Confederation Cup: 2 appearances

2017 - Group stage
2021 - withdrew in preliminary round

- CAF Cup: 1 appearance

1995 – First Round

- CAF Cup Winners' Cup: 1 appearance

1987 – Preliminary round

=== African record ===
Year	Competition	Round	Opponent	Home	Away	Aggregate
1987	African Cup Winners' Cup	PR	Royal Lesotho Defence Force	1–1	1–1	2–2
1994	African Cup of Champions Clubs	PR	(Réunion) JS Saint-Pierroise	4–0	2–2	6–2
1995	CAF Cup	1R	(Tanzania) Malindi FC	0–1	2–0	0–3
1998	CAF Champions League	PR	Royal Lesotho Defence Force	1–4	0–2	1–6
2006	CAF Champions League	PR	(South Africa) Orlando Pirates	0–5	2–2	2–7
2010	CAF Champions League	PR	(South Africa) Supersport United	1–3	2–2	3–5
2013	CAF Champions League	PR	(Zambia) Zanaco	0–0	2–3	2–3
2014	CAF Champions League	PR	(Zambia) Nkana	2–0	5–2	4–5
2015	CAF Champions League	PR	(Zambia) ZESCO United	1–1	1–0	1–2
2016	CAF Champions League	PR	(Rwanda) APR	1–0	1–4	2–4
2017	CAF Confederation Cup	PR	(Botswana) Orapa United	3–2	1–0	4–2
2017	CAF Confederation Cup	1R	(Tanzania) Azam	3–0	0–1	3–1
2017	CAF Confederation Cup	PO	(Republic of the Congo) AC Léopards	4–2	0–1	4–3
2017	CAF Confederation Cup	Group B	(Tunisia) CS Sfaxien	1–3	0–1	3rd
2017	CAF Confederation Cup	Group B	(South Africa) Platinum Stars	4–2	2–2	3rd
2017	CAF Confederation Cup	Group B	(Algeria) MC Alger	0–0	1–2	3rd
2018	CAF Champions League	PR	(Lesotho) Bantu	1–3	2–4	5–5
2018	CAF Champions League	1R	(Zambia) Zanaco	2–1	0–1	3–1
2018	CAF Champions League	Group D	(Zambia) ZESCO United	0–3	1–1	4th
2018	CAF Champions League	Group D	(Angola) 1º de Agosto	1–0	1–2	4th
2018	CAF Champions League	Group D	(Tunisia) Étoile du Sahel	0–3	0–2	4th
2018–19	CAF Champions League	PR	(Tanzania) Simba	0–4	1–4	1–8
2020–21	CAF Confederation Cup	PR	(Angola) Sagrada Esperança	–	–	w/o
2024–25	CAF Champions League	1R	(Mozambique) Ferroviário da Beira	1–0	0–0	1–0
2024–25	CAF Champions League	2R	(South Africa) Mamelodi Sundowns	0–4	0–4	0–8

== Staff ==
Management

Chairman:

- Victor Gamedze (The late-2018)

CEO:

- Sibusiso Manana (The late-2017)

General manager:

- Sandile Zwane

Sports

Head coach:

- Sindiso Gama

Assistant coach:

- Mduduzi Nxumalo

== Notable coaches ==
- (Austria) Walter Rautmann
- (Mali) Alou Badara
- (Zambia) Jani Simulambo
- Nyanga 'Crooks' Hlophe (2013)
- (Zambia) Chris Tembo (2014)
- Siyabonga Bhembe

== Crest ==
Old crest

Present crest

== Notable former players ==
All players presented during his career the nationalside of his homeland.

(Bonaire)

- Berry Sonnenschein

(Cameroon)

- Jocial Chakunte

(Gabon)

- Thibault Tchicaya

(The Gambia)

- Demba Senyang

(Ghana)

- Sumalia John Uyin

(Nigeria)

- Ifeanyi Ezewudo
- Olayeni Fashina
- Jimoh Moses

(South Africa)

- Thabiso Maharala
- Kingsley Ncongo

(Eswatini)

- Mfanafuthi Taribo Bhembe
- Musa Dlamini
- Dennis Fakudze
- Menzi Gamedze
- Sipho Gumbi
- Manqoba Kunene
- Sifiso Mabila
- Mzwandile Mamba
- Sifiso Maseko
- Civil Matsebula
- Wandile Mazibuko
- Sandile Mdlovu
- Sidell Mgonodi
- Sandile Humphrey Motsa
- Mfanufikile Ndzimande

(Eswatini)

- Mlungisi Ngubane
- Bongiswa Nhlabatsi
- Gcina Joe Simelane
- Bright Zondo

(Zimbabwe)

- Ephraim Mazarura
- Stanford Ncube
