= Mbabane Highlanders F.C. =

Association football club in Eswatini

Mbabane Highlanders FC
- Full name: Mbabane Highlanders Football Club
- Nickname: Ezimnyama Ngenkani
- Founded: 1952; 74 years ago
- Ground: Somhlolo National Stadium; Lobamba, Eswatini
- Capacity: 20,000
- League: Premier League of Eswatini
- 2025–26: Premier League of Eswatini, 5th of 16
Home colours	Away colours

Mbabane Highlanders is a association football club based in Mbabane. They have won more national titles than any other club, although their most recent league title was in 2001.

In July 2025, Shauwn Mkhize was unveiled as club president, and the club was rebranded as Mbabane Highlanders AM, AM standing for the initials of Mkhize's son, Andile Mpisane. Mkhize previously owned South African Premiership club Royal AM, which was expelled from the league after the South African Revenue Service issued a preservation order against the club for unpaid tax debt.

As part of Mkhize's unveiling, the club changed its colours from black and white, to black and gold, and unveiled a new logo.

In August 2025, Mkhize's ownership of the club was confirmed.

== Fan violence ==
Following the concession of a goal against Nsingizini Hotspurs in the 2026 Ingwenyama Cup, fans invaded the field and beat up the referee.

The club was found guilty of causing the abandonment of the match, was expelled from the competition, and subsequently fined E50 000.

== Achievements ==
- Swazi Premier League: 13

1974, 1976, 1980, 1982, 1984, 1986, 1988, 1991, 1992, 1995, 1997, 2000, 2001.

- Swazibank Cup: 7

1983, 1985, 1990, 1997, 1999, 2009, 2010.

- Swazi Charity Cup: 5

1998, 2007, 2008, 2010, 2019.

- Swazi Trade Fair Cup: 1

1999.

- Bible Cup: 2

2022
2023

== Performance in CAF competitions ==
- CAF Champions League: 1 appearance

2001 – Preliminary Round

- African Cup of Champions Clubs: 7 appearances

1977 – withdraw
1981 – First Round
1983 – First Round
1985 – First Round
1987 – First Round
1993 – Preliminary Round
1996 – First Round

- CAF Confederation Cup: 4 appearances

2010 – Preliminary Round
2011 – Preliminary Round
2013 - Preliminary Round
2022–23 - Preliminary round

- CAF Cup Winners' Cup: 3 appearances

1981 – withdraw
1984 – First Round
1991 – First Round
