= 2021–22 Orlando Pirates F.C. season =

Orlando Pirates F.C.
2021–22 season
- Chairman: Irvin Khoza
- Manager: Mandla Ncikazi & Fadlu Davids
- DStv Premiership: 5th
- MTN 8: Quarter-finals
- Nedbank Cup: Last 16
- CAF Confederation Cup: Final (runners-up)
- Top goalscorer: League: Deon Hotto(6); All: Bandile Shandu; Deon Hotto; Kwame Peprah (7 each)
- Highest home attendance: 200 000
- Lowest home attendance: 13 478
- Biggest win: Stellenbosch F.C. vs 0–3 ( 24 November 2021 ) Royal Leopards F.C. vs 2–6 ( 27 February 2022) Orlando Pirates 4 -1 (24 May 2022)
| Home colours | Away colours |

The 2021–22 season is Orlando Pirates's 26th consecutive season in the South African Premier Division, the top tier of South African soccer. They will also participate in the Nedbank Cup, the MTN 8 and the CAF Confederation Cup.

== Review and events ==
Orlando Pirates F.C. started the 2021–22 Season in the MTN 8 as defending champions but were eliminated by Swallows F.C. in the Quarter-finals. Josef Zinnbauer stepped down 24 hours after the lose as Orlando Pirates F.C. manager.

== Players ==
Statistics correct as of : 17 April 2022

List of squad players, including number of appearances by competition

| No. | Pos | Nat | Player | Total | | DStv Premiership | | MTN 8 Cup | | Nedbank Cup | | CAF Confederation Cup | |
| No. | Pos | Nat | Player | Apps | Goals | Apps | Goals | Apps | Goals | Apps | Goals | Apps | Goals |
|---|---|---|---|---|---|---|---|---|---|---|---|---|---|
| 30 | GK | (South Africa) RSA | Wayne Sandilands | 0 | 0 | 0 | 0 | 0 | 0 | 0 | 0 | 0 | 0 |
| 31 | GK | (Ghana) GHA | Richard Ofori | 12 | 0 | 5 | 0 | 1 | 0 | 1 | 0 | 5 | 0 |
| 40 | GK | (South Africa) RSA | Siyabonga Mpontshane | 25 | 0 | 18 | 0 | 0 | 0 | 1 | 0 | 6 | 0 |
| 4 | DF | (South Africa) RSA | Happy Jele (Captain) | 22 | 4 | 13 | 1 | 1 | 0 | 1 | 0 | 7 | 3 |
| 2 | DF | (South Africa) RSA | James Monyane | 2 | 0 | 0 | 0 | 0 | 0 | 0 | 0 | 2 | 0 |
| 5 | DF | (South Africa) RSA | Ntsikelelo Nyauza | 21 | 1 | 13 | 0 | 1 | 0 | 1 | 0 | 6 | 1 |
| 39 | DF | (South Africa) RSA | Sandile Mthethwa | 1 | 0 | 1 | 0 | 0 | 0 | 0 | 0 | 0 | 0 |
| 14 | DF | (South Africa) RSA | Thulani Hlatshwayo | 15 | 0 | 10 | 0 | 1 | 0 | 0 | 0 | 4 | 0 |
| 17 | DF | (South Africa) RSA | Wayde Jooste | 9 | 0 | 3 | 0 | 1 | 0 | 0 | 0 | 5 | 0 |
| 19 | DF | (South Africa) RSA | Bongani Sam | 12 | 0 | 7 | 0 | 1 | 0 | 0 | 0 | 4 | 0 |
| 23 | DF | (South Africa) RSA | Innocent Maela | 14 | 0 | 5 | 0 | 1 | 0 | 1 | 0 | 7 | 0 |
| 29 | DF | (South Africa) RSA | Paseka Mako | 30 | 0 | 21 | 0 | 1 | 0 | 1 | 0 | 7 | 0 |
| 26 | DF | (South Africa) RSA | Bandile Shandu | 33 | 7 | 21 | 2 | 1 | 0 | 2 | 1 | 9 | 4 |
| 36 | DF | (South Africa) RSA | Thabiso Sesane | 0 | 0 | 0 | 0 | 0 | 0 | 0 | 0 | 0 | 0 |
| 38 | DF | (South Africa) RSA | Kwanda Mngonyama | 8 | 0 | 5 | 0 | 0 | 0 | 0 | 0 | 3 | 0 |
| 49 | DF | (Nigeria) NGR | Olisa Ndah | 24 | 0 | 16 | 0 | 0 | 0 | 2 | 0 | 6 | 0 |
| 12 | MF | (South Africa) RSA | Collins Makgaka | 13 | 2 | 9 | 2 | 0 | 0 | 0 | 0 | 4 | 0 |
| 34 | MF | (South Africa) RSA | Azola Tshobeni | 0 | 0 | 0 | 0 | 0 | 0 | 0 | 0 | 0 | 0 |
| 27 | MF | (South Africa) RSA | Katlego Cwinyane | 0 | 0 | 0 | 0 | 0 | 0 | 0 | 0 | 0 | 0 |
| 28 | MF | (South Africa) RSA | Ntsako Makhubela | 17 | 0 | 13 | 0 | 0 | 0 | 1 | 0 | 3 | 0 |
| 3 | MF | (South Africa) RSA | Thembinkosi Lorch | 18 | 0 | 10 | 0 | 0 | 0 | 2 | 0 | 6 | 0 |
| 6 | MF | (South Africa) RSA | Ben Motshwari | 21 | 0 | 13 | 0 | 0 | 0 | 2 | 0 | 6 | 0 |
| 8 | MF | (South Africa) RSA | Siphesihle Ndlovu | 9 | 0 | 4 | 0 | 0 | 0 | 0 | 0 | 5 | 0 |
| 11 | MF | (Namibia) NAM | Deon Hotto | 35 | 7 | 22 | 6 | 1 | 0 | 2 | 1 | 10 | 0 |
| 15 | MF | (South Africa) RSA | Fortune Makaringe | 33 | 3 | 20 | 1 | 1 | 0 | 2 | 0 | 10 | 2 |
| 16 | MF | (South Africa) RSA | Thabang Monare | 23 | 0 | 12 | 0 | 1 | 0 | 2 | 0 | 8 | 0 |
| 18 | MF | (South Africa) RSA | Kabelo Dlamini | 27 | 5 | 16 | 1 | 1 | 1 | 1 | 0 | 9 | 3 |
| 21 | MF | (South Africa) RSA | Nkanyiso Zungu | 2 | 0 | 0 | 0 | 0 | 0 | 0 | 0 | 2 | 0 |
| 32 | MF | (South Africa) RSA | Linda Mntambo | 11 | 3 | 6 | 3 | 0 | 0 | 0 | 0 | 5 | 0 |
| 44 | MF | (South Africa) RSA | Abel Mabaso | 21 | 1 | 14 | 1 | 1 | 0 | 1 | 0 | 5 | 0 |
| 45 | MF | (South Africa) RSA | Vincent Pule | 7 | 0 | 6 | 0 | 1 | 0 | 0 | 0 | 0 | 0 |
| 20 | MF | (South Africa) RSA | Goodman Mosele | 24 | 3 | 14 | 3 | 0 | 0 | 2 | 0 | 8 | 0 |
| 7 | FW | (Malawi) MAW | Gabadinho Mhango | 9 | 0 | 3 | 0 | 0 | 0 | 0 | 0 | 6 | 0 |
| 9 | FW | (South Africa) RSA | Tshegofatso Mabasa | 17 | 3 | 12 | 2 | 0 | 0 | 0 | 0 | 5 | 1 |
| 25 | FW | (South Africa) RSA | Zakhele Lepasa | 14 | 0 | 6 | 0 | 0 | 0 | 2 | 0 | 6 | 0 |
| 37 | FW | (Zimbabwe) ZIM | Terrence Dzvukamanja | 25 | 2 | 16 | 0 | 0 | 0 | 1 | 0 | 8 | 2 |
| 24 | FW | (South Africa) RSA | Tebogo Tlolane | 3 | 0 | 2 | 0 | 1 | 0 | 0 | 0 | 0 | 0 |
| 42 | FW | (South Africa) RSA | Boitumelo Radiopane | 3 | 0 | 3 | 0 | 0 | 0 | 0 | 0 | 0 | 0 |
| 46 | FW | (Ghana) GHA | Kwame Peprah | 30 | 7 | 20 | 5 | 0 | 0 | 2 | 0 | 8 | 2 |
| 43 | FW | (South Africa) RSA | Simo Bophela | 1 | 0 | 1 | 0 | 0 | 0 | 0 | 0 | 0 | 0 |

== Preseason friendlies ==
Orlando Pirates F.C. play Kaizer Chiefs F.C. on a preseason friendly since 2011 except for 2018 (due to FIFA World Cup Qualifications) and 2020 (due to COVID-19 virus).

=== Carling Black Label Cup ===
The 2021 Carling Black Label Cup was the ninth edition of the Carling Black Label Cup to be held.

1 August 2021

| Kaizer Chiefs | 0–0 | Orlando Pirates |
Penalties
| | 4–3 |

Orlando Stadium, Soweto

== League ==
=== DStv Premiership Log ===
| Pos | Team | Pld | W | D | L | GF | GA | GD | Pts | Qualification or relegation |
|---|---|---|---|---|---|---|---|---|---|---|
| 4 | Stellenbosch | 30 | 11 | 14 | 5 | 32 | 23 | +9 | 47 | Qualification for Confederation Cup |
| 5 | Kaizer Chiefs | 30 | 13 | 8 | 9 | 34 | 26 | +8 | 47 | |
| 6 | Orlando Pirates | 30 | 10 | 14 | 6 | 34 | 28 | +6 | 44 | |
| 7 | AmaZulu | 30 | 8 | 17 | 5 | 24 | 22 | +2 | 41 | |
| 8 | SuperSport United | 30 | 10 | 10 | 10 | 36 | 32 | +4 | 40 | |

Source: Premier Soccer League

=== Results by matchday ===
| Matchday | 1 | 2 | 3 | 4 | 5 | 6 | 7 | 8 | 9 | 10 | 11 | 12 | 13 | 14 | 15 | 16 | 17 | 18 | 19 | 20 | 21 | 22 | 23 | 24 | 25 | 26 | 27 | 28 |
|---|---|---|---|---|---|---|---|---|---|---|---|---|---|---|---|---|---|---|---|---|---|---|---|---|---|---|---|---|
| Ground | H | A | H | A | H | A | A | H | H | A | A | A | H | A | H | A | A | H | H | H | H | H | H | A | A | A | A | H |
| Results | D | D | W | W | L | D | D | D | W | L | D | W | D | D | W | D | L | W | W | D | D | L | W | W | D | D | L | W |
| Position | 5 | 11 | 4 | 4 | 5 | 6 | 7 | 7 | 6 | 7 | 7 | 7 | 7 | 7 | 3 | 3 | 5 | 5 | 2 | 2 | 4 | 4 | 4 | 4 | 5 | 6 | 6 | 5 |

Updated to match(es) played on 24 May 2022. Source:
A = Away; H = Home; W = Win; D = Draw; L = Loss

=== DStv Premiership ===
| 21 August 2021 | Orlando Pirates | 2–2 | Stellenbosch | Johannesburg, Soweto |
| 15:00 SAST | Hotto 18'; Mosele 49' | Report | Isaacs 2'; Moseamedi 55' | Stadium: Orlando Stadium |

| 24 August 2021 | Marumo Gallants | 0–0 | Orlando Pirates | Polokwane |
| 17:00 SAST | | | | Stadium: Peter Mokaba Stadium |

| 13 September 2021 | Orlando Pirates | 1–0 | Swallows F.C. | Johannesburg, Soweto |
| 15:00 SAST | Mabasa 78' | | | Stadium: Orlando Stadium |

| 18 September 2021 | Chippa United | 1–3 | Orlando Pirates | Port Elizabeth |
| 15:00 SAST | Mahlambi 12' | Report | Mabasa 29'; Mabaso 58'; Mosele 78' | Stadium: Nelson Mandela Bay Stadium |

| 25 September 2021 | Orlando Pirates | 0–2 | Mamelodi Sundowns | Johannesburg, Soweto |
| 15:00 SAST | | Report | Shalulile 54', 72' | Stadium: Orlando Stadium |

| 2 October 2021 | Cape Town City | 1–1 | Orlando Pirates | Cape Town |
| 17:30 SAST | Mdantsane 51' (pen.) | Report | Jele 13' | Stadium: Cape Town Stadium |

| 20 October 2021 | Maritzburg United | 0–0 | Orlando Pirates | Harry Gwala Stadium |
| 17:30 SAST | | Report |

| 29 October 2021 | Orlando Pirates | 1–1 | Royal AM | Soweto, Johannesburg |
| 17:30 SAST | Mntambo 45' | Report | Mashiane 33' | Stadium: Orlando Stadium |

| 2 November 2021 | Orlando Pirates | 2–1 | Sekhukhune | Soweto, Johannesburg |
| 17:30 SAST | Mntambo 76' (pen.); Dlamini 77' | | Parusnath 41' | Stadium: Orlando Stadium |

| 6 November 2021 | Kaizer Chiefs | 2–1 | Orlando Pirates | Johannesburg |
| 15:30 SAST | Dolly 49', 90+1' (pen.) | | Mntambo 87' | Stadium: FNB Stadium |

| 20 November 2021 | Golden Arrows | 0–0 | Orlando Pirates | Kwamashu, Durban |
| 15:30 SAST | | Report | | Stadium: Princess Magogo Stadium |

| 24 November 2021 | Stellenbosch | 0–3 | Orlando Pirates | Stellenbosch |
| 17:30 SAST | | Report | Makgaka 20'; Hotto 22', 48' | Stadium: Danie Craven Stadium |

| 2 December 2021 | Orlando Pirates | 0–0 | Baroka | Soweto, Johannesburg |
| 19:30 SAST | | | | Stadium: Orlando Stadium |

| 8 December 2021 | AmaZulu | 1–1 | Orlando Pirates | Durban |
| 17:30 SAST | Moremi 45' | Report | Hotto 29' | Stadium: Jonsson Kings Park |

| 11 December 2021 | Orlando Pirates | 2–0 | TS Galaxy | Soweto, Johannesburg |
| 17:30 SAST | Shandu 14'; Makgaka 50' | Report | | Stadium: Orlando Stadium |

| 14 December 2021 | Swallows F.C. | 1–1 | Orlando Pirates | Soweto, Johannesburg |
| 19:30 SAST | Gamaldien 10' (pen.) | Report | Shandu 3' | Stadium: Dobsonville Stadium |

| 17 December 2021 | Mamelodi Sundowns | 4–1 | Orlando Pirates | Pretoria |
| 19:30 SAST | Zwane 51'; Šafranko 61' 73'; Shalulile 76' | Report | Makaringe 90+2' | Stadium: Loftus Versfeld Stadium |

| 20 December 2021 | Orlando Pirates | 2–1 | Marumo Gallants | Soweto, Johannesburg |
| 19:30 SAST | Peprah 24', 26' | Report | Ntshangase 12' | Stadium: Orlando Stadium |

| 23 December 2021 | Orlando Pirates | 2–1 | AmaZulu | Soweto, Johannesburg |
| 19:30 SAST | Peprah 37', 48' | Report | Memela 3' | Stadium: Orlando Stadium |

| 16 February 2022 | Orlando Pirates | 0–0 | Golden Arrows | Soweto, Johannesburg |
| 19:30 SAST | | Report | | Stadium: Orlando Stadium |

| 2 March 2022 | Orlando Pirates | 0–0 | Cape Town City | Soweto, Johannesburg |
| 17:30 SAST | | | | Stadium: Orlando Stadium |

| 5 March 2022 | Orlando Pirates | 1–2 | Kaizer Chiefs | Soweto, Johannesburg |
| 15:30 SAST | Peprah 54' | | Frosler 18'; Mathoho 81' | Stadium: Orlando Stadium |

| 16 March 2022 | Orlando Pirates | 3–2 | SuperSport United | Soweto, Johannesburg |
| 19:30 SAST | Hotto 45', 48'; Mosele 90+4' | | Johannes 7'; Lungu 18' | Stadium: Orlando Stadium |

| 6 April 2022 | Sekhukhune United | 0–1 | Orlando Pirates | Johannesburg |
| 17:30 SAST | | | Makaringe 82' | Stadium: Emirates Airline Park |

| 12 April 2022 | Baroka | 0–0 | Orlando Pirates | Polokwane |
| SAST | | | | Stadium: Peter Mokaba Stadium |

| 27 April 2022 | Orlando Pirates | 0–0 | Chippa United | Soweto, Johannesburg |
| SAST | | | | Stadium: Orlando Stadium |

| 2 May 2022 | TS Galaxy | 1–0 | Orlando Pirates | Mbombela |
| SAST | Hlongwane 33' | | | Stadium: Mbombela Stadium |

| 24 May 2022 | Orlando Pirates | 4–1 | Maritzburg United | Soweto, Johannesburg |
| 19:00 SAST | Lorch 21'; Peprah 42'; Hotto 60'; Dlamini 69' | | Samu 63' | Stadium: Orlando Stadium |

| 27 May 2022 | Royal AM | 2–2 | Orlando Pirates | Durban |
| SAST | Matlaba 79'; Thikazi 90+3' | Report | 3' Hotto; 7' Peprah | Stadium: Chatsworth Stadium |

| 30 May 2022 | SuperSport United | 2–0 | Orlando Pirates | Atteridgeville |
| SAST | Makaringe 19' (o.g.); Lungu 69' (pen.) | Report | | Stadium: Lucas Moripe Stadium |

== Competitions ==
=== MTN 8 Cup ===
Quarter-finals

14 August 2021
18:00

| Orlando Pirates | 1–2 | Swallows F.C. |
|---|---|---|
| K.Dlamini 30' | Report | R.Gamaldien 16' 23' |

Orlando Stadium, Soweto, Johannesburg
Attendance: 0

Orlando Pirates F.C. title defence came to an end after the defeat.

=== Nedbank Cup ===
Last 32 (second round)

6 February 2022
15:00 SAST

| Orlando Pirates | 1–0 | AmaZulu F.C. |
|---|---|---|
| Hotto 53' | Report |

Orlando Stadium, Soweto, Johannesburg

Last 16 (third round)

9 March 2022
18:00 SAST

| Marumo Gallants | 1–1 Orlando Pirates Lose 5 -4 on Penalties | Orlando Pirates |
|---|---|---|
| Ndlondlo 20' | | Shandu 30' |

Peter Mokaba Stadium, Polokwane

Orlando Pirates F.C. Cup Journey Ended Here

== International competitions ==
=== CAF Confederation Cup ===
Second round

15 October 2021
16:30 SAST

| CSMD Diables Noirs (Republic of the Congo) | 0–0 | (South Africa) Orlando Pirates |
|---|---|---|
| | Report |

Stade Alphonse Massemba-Débat
23 October 2021
16:30 SAST

| Orlando Pirates (South Africa) | 1–0 | (Republic of the Congo) CSMD Diables Noirs |
|---|---|---|
| Jele 17' |

Orlando Stadium, Johannesburg, Soweto

Orlando Pirates Win By 1–0 On Aggregate

Play Off Round

28 November 2021
18:00 SAST

| (Liberia) LPRC Oilers | 0–2 | (South Africa) Orlando Pirates |
|---|---|---|
| | | Mabasa 44'; Makaringe 90+4' |

Samuel Kanyon Doe Sports Complex, Paynesville, Liberia
Attendance: 3000
November 2021
SAST

| Orlando Pirates (South Africa) | w/o | LPRC Oilers (Liberia) |

Orlando Stadium, Johannesburg, Soweto

Orlando Pirates F.C. progress to the Group Stage following a forfeit by LPRC Oilers

=== Group B ===
| Pos | Team | Pld | W | D | L | GF | GA | GD | Pts | Qualification | ORL | ITT | JSS | ROL |
|---|---|---|---|---|---|---|---|---|---|---|---|---|---|---|
| 1 | (South Africa) Orlando Pirates | 6 | 4 | 1 | 1 | 15 | 5 | +10 | 13 | Advance to knockout stage | — | 0–0 | 2–0 | 3–0 |
| 2 | (Libya) Al Ittihad | 6 | 3 | 2 | 1 | 9 | 7 | +2 | 11 | Advance to knockout stage | 3–2 | — | 1–1 | 3–2 |
| 3 | (Algeria) JS Saoura | 6 | 3 | 1 | 2 | 6 | 5 | +1 | 10 | | 0–2 | 1–0 | — | 2–0 |
| 4 | (Eswatini) Royal Leopards | 6 | 0 | 0 | 6 | 5 | 18 | −13 | 0 | | 2–6 | 1–2 | 0–2 | — |

Source: CAF
Rules for classification: Group stage tiebreakers
13 February 2022
18:00 UTC+2

| Orlando Pirates (South Africa) | 2–0 | (Algeria) JS Saoura |
|---|---|---|
| Jele 3'; Shandu 66' | Report |

Orlando Stadium, Johannesburg
Referee: Mahmood Ismail (Sudan)
6 March 2022 (Note: The Royal Leopards v Al Ittihad match, originally scheduled to be played on 13 February 2022, was rescheduled to be played on 6 March 2022 due to Royal Leopards late qualification.)
16:00 UTC+2

| Royal Leopards (Eswatini) | 1–2 | (Libya) Al Ittihad |
|---|---|---|
| bin Ali 52' (o.g.) | Report | Eisay 2'; Al Khouja 35' |

Mbombela Stadium, Mbombela (South Africa) (Note: Royal Leopards F.C. play their group stage home matches at Mbombela Stadium, Mbombela (South Africa), instead of their regular home stadium Simunye Park, Simunye, which did not meet CAF requirements.)
Referee: Celso Alvação (Mozambique)

20 February 2022
18:00 UTC+2

| Al Ittihad (Libya) | 3–2 | (South Africa) Orlando Pirates |
|---|---|---|
| Al Warfali 14'; Eisay 28'; Al Khouja 53' | Report | Shandu 26', 45+1' |

Benina Martyrs Stadium, Benghazi
Referee: Al Hadi Mahamat (Chad)
20 February 2022
20:00 UTC+1

| JS Saoura (Algeria) | 2–0 | (Eswatini) Royal Leopards |
|---|---|---|
| Hamidi 9' (pen.); Hammia 90+3' (pen.) | Report |

Stade du 5 Juillet, Algiers (Note: JS Saoura play their group stage home matches at Stade du 5 Juillet, Algiers, instead of their regular home stadium Stade 20 Août 1955, Béchar, which did not meet CAF requirements.)
Referee: Djindo Louis Houngnandandé (Benin)

27 February 2022
18:00 UTC+2

| Al Ittihad (Libya) | 1–1 | (Algeria) JS Saoura |
|---|---|---|
| Zubya 22' | Report | Ouis 30' |

Benina Martyrs Stadium, Benghazi
Referee: Daouda Gueye (Senegal)
27 February 2022
18:00 UTC+2

| Royal Leopards (Eswatini) | 2–6 | (South Africa) Orlando Pirates |
|---|---|---|
| Mabelesa 6'; Mokenkoane 8' | Report | M. Dlamini 20' (o.g.); Shandu 38'; Peprah 45+1'; Jele 57'; K. Dlamini 60'; Dzvukamanja 80' |

Mbombela Stadium, Mbombela (South Africa)
Referee: Messie Nkounkou (Congo)

13 March 2022
18:00 UTC+2

| Orlando Pirates (South Africa) | 3–0 | (Eswatini) Royal Leopards |
|---|---|---|
| Makaringe 48'; K. Dlamini 56'; Dzvukamanja 70' | Report |

Orlando Stadium, Johannesburg
Referee: Mohamed Athoumani (Comoros)
13 March 2022
20:00 UTC+1

| JS Saoura (Algeria) | 1–0 | (Libya) Al Ittihad |
|---|---|---|
| Bellatreche 1' | Report |

Stade du 5 Juillet, Algiers
Referee: Mahmoud El Banna (Egypt)

20 March 2022
18:00 UTC+2

| Al Ittihad (Libya) | 3–2 | (Eswatini) Royal Leopards |
|---|---|---|
| Al Warfali 45+2' (pen.), 90+3'; Al-Misrati 70' | Report | Mokenkoane 58'; B. C. Dlamini 66' |

Benina Martyrs Stadium, Benghazi
Referee: Fabricio Duarte (Cape Verde)
20 March 2022
20:00 UTC+1

| JS Saoura (Algeria) | 0–2 | (South Africa) Orlando Pirates |
|---|---|---|
| | Report | Nyauza 48'; K. Dlamini 51' |

Stade du 5 Juillet, Algiers
Referee: Mahamadou Kéïta (Mali)

3 April 2022
18:00 UTC+2

| Royal Leopards (Eswatini) | 0–2 | (Algeria) JS Saoura |
|---|---|---|
| | Report | Saâdi 51'; Bellatreche 54' |

Mbombela Stadium, Mbombela (South Africa)
Referee: Patrice Milazar (Mauritius)
3 April 2022
18:00 UTC+2

| Orlando Pirates (South Africa) | 0–0 | (Libya) Al Ittihad |
|---|---|---|
| | Report |

Orlando Stadium, Johannesburg
Referee: Samuel Uwikunda (Rwanda)

=== Knockout stage ===
Quarter-finals

1st Leg

17 April 2022
19:00 UTC+3

| Simba (Tanzania) | 1–0 | (South Africa) Orlando Pirates |
|---|---|---|
| Kapombe 68' (pen.) | Report |

National Stadium, Dar es Salaam

2nd Leg

24 April 2022
18:00 UTC+2

| Orlando Pirates (South Africa) | 1–0 | (Tanzania) Simba |
|---|---|---|
| Peprah 60' | Report |

Orlando Stadium, Johannesburg
Referee: Bernard Camille (Seychelles)

1–1 on aggregate. Orlando Pirates won 4–3 on penalties.

Semi-finals

1st Leg

8 May 2022
18:00 UTC+2

| Al Ahli Tripoli (Libya) | v | (South Africa) Orlando Pirates |
|---|---|---|
| | Report |

Benina Martyrs Stadium, Benghazi
Referee: Redouane Jiyed (Morocco)

2nd Leg

15 May 2022
18:00 UTC+2

| Orlando Pirates (South Africa) | v | (Libya) Al Ahli Tripoli |
|---|---|---|
| | Report |

Orlando Stadium, Johannesburg
Referee: Bakary Gassama (Gambia)
