= 2020–21 Orlando Pirates F.C. season =

Orlando Pirates F.C.
2020–21 season
- Chairman: Irvin Khoza
- Manager: Josef Zinnbauer
- DStv Premiership: 3rd (CAF Confederation Cup)
- MTN 8: Winners
- Nedbank Cup: Quarter-finals
- CAF Confederation Cup: Quarter-finals
- Top goalscorer: League: Vincent Pule (6); All: Vincent Pule (9)
- Highest home attendance: None
- Lowest home attendance: None
Home colours	Away colours

The 2020–21 season was Orlando Pirates F.C. 25th season in the South African Premier Division, the highest division of South African football league system. Orlando Pirates F.C. participated in the MTN 8 Cup, CAF Confederation Cup and the Nedbank Cup.

== Review and events ==
Orlando Pirates F.C. won the MTN 8 cup and finished 3rd in the 2020–21 DStv Premiership and Qualified for the 2021-22 CAF Confederation Cup following Kaizer Chiefs loss to Egyptian Club Al Ahly SC in the 2020-21 CAF Champions League final. The team also reached the quarter-finals of the 2020-21 CAF Confederation Cup but were knocked out by Moroccan Club Raja Casablanca and eventual winners of the 2020-21 CAF Confederation Cup. In the Nedbank Cup, Orlando Pirates F.C. was knocked out by Mamelodi Sundowns F.C. The MTN 8 Triumph ended Orlando Pirates F.C. almost 6 year trophy drought since last winning a major cup in 2014, by winning the 2013–14 Nedbank Cup.

== Players ==
=== First team squad ===
As of 16 October 2020

Note: Flags indicate national team as defined under FIFA eligibility rules; some limited exceptions apply. Players may hold more than one non-FIFA nationality.

No.	Pos.	Nation	Player
2	DF	RSA	James Monyane
3	MF	RSA	Thembinkosi Lorch
4	DF	RSA	Happy Jele (captain)
5	DF	RSA	Ntsikelelo Nyauza
6	MF	RSA	Ben Motshwari
7	FW	MAW	Gabadinho Mhango
8	MF	RSA	Siphesihle Ndlovu
9	FW	RSA	Tshegofatso Mabasa
11	MF	NAM	Deon Hotto
12	MF	RSA	Collins Makgaka
14	DF	RSA	Thulani Hlatshwayo
15	MF	RSA	Fortune Makaringe
16	MF	RSA	Thabang Monare
17	DF	RSA	Wayde Jooste
18	MF	RSA	Kabelo Dlamini
19	DF	RSA	Bongani Sam
21	MF	RSA	Nkanyiso Zungu
23	DF	RSA	Innocent Maela
25	FW	RSA	Zakhele Lepasa
26	FW	ZAM	Austin Muwowo
29	DF	RSA	Paseka Mako
30	GK	RSA	Wayne Sandilands

No.	Pos.	Nation	Player
31	GK	GHA	Richard Ofori
32	MF	RSA	Linda Mntambo
37	FW	ZIM	Terrence Dzvukamanja
39	FW	COD	Jean-Marc Makusu Mundele
40	GK	RSA	Siyabonga Mpontshane
44	MF	RSA	Abel Mabaso
45	FW	RSA	Vincent Pule

== Competitions ==
=== DStv Premiership ===
Pos	Team	Pld	W	D	L	GF	GA	GD	Pts	Qualification or relegation
1	Mamelodi Sundowns (C)	30	19	10	1	49	14	+35	67	Qualification for Champions League
2	AmaZulu	30	15	9	6	38	23	+15	54	Qualification for Champions League
3	Orlando Pirates	30	13	11	6	33	22	+11	50	Qualification for Confederation Cup
4	Lamontville Golden Arrows	30	11	14	5	40	28	+12	47	
5	SuperSport United	30	11	12	7	37	31	+6	45	

Updated to match(es) played on 5 June 2021. Source: Premier Soccer League
(C) Champions

Orlando Pirates F.C. finished the season 3rd, and qualified for the 2021-22 CAF Confederation Cup .

=== MTN 8 Cup ===
Quarter-finals

17 October 2020
18:00

Orlando Pirates	1–0	Cape Town City
Dzvukamanja 23'	Report

Orlando Stadium, Soweto, Johannesburg
Attendance: 0

Semi-finals

1st Leg

31 August 2020
15:00

Orlando Pirates	3–0	Kaizer Chiefs
Z.Lepasa 26'; V.Pule 66'; T.Lorch 81'

Orlando Stadium, Soweto, Johannesburg
Attendance: 0
Referee: Eugene Ndluli

2nd Leg

8 November 2020
15:00

Kaizer Chiefs	0–2	Orlando Pirates
	Report	59' F.Makaringe; 80' L.Mntambo

FNB Stadium, Johannesburg

Orlando Pirates won 5–0 on aggregate

Final

Bloemfontein Celtic	1–2	Orlando Pirates
Luthuli 4'	Report	Hotto 32'; Lorch 53'

Moses Mabhida Stadium, Durban, KZN
Referee: Luxolo Badi

Luthuli scores his goal after a corner kick for Bloemfontein Celtic in the 4th minute. Orlando Pirates player Thabang Monare received an injury and was replaced by Thembinkosi lorch. In the 32nd minute, Hotto levels the matter for Orlando Pirates and the score was 1–1. After half time Thembinkosi lorch was fouled in the box and the referee called for a penalty in which was taken by lorch and made it 2–1 for Pirates scoring his second goal in the competition. The match ended in 2–1 and Pirates took the trophy ending their six-year trophy drought.

=== Nedbank Cup ===
Second round

Orlando Pirates F.C. entered the second Round as by competitions rules that all 16 Premier Soccer League (PSL) clubs start the competition at the second round.

Orlando Pirates was drawn with National First Division (NFD) club Uthongathi F.C.

6 February 2021	Orlando Pirates	1–0	Uthongathi	Soweto, Johannesburg
14:00	Mhango 63'			Stadium: Orlando Stadium

Third round

27 February 2021	Maritzburg United	1–3	Orlando Pirates	Pietermaritzburg
18:00	Kutumela 9'		Dlamini 56'; Hotto 57'; Pule 78'	Stadium: Harry Gwala Stadium

Quarter-finals

15 April 2021	Mamelodi Sundowns	4–1	Orlando Pirates	Arcadia, Pretoria
17:30	Shalulile 12'; Zwane 49'; Kapinga 78'; Kekana 86'		Mabaso 33'	Stadium: Loftus Versfeld Stadium

Orlando Pirates journey came to an end as they were eliminated by Mamelodi Sundowns.

== International Competitions ==
=== CAF Confederation Cup ===
Orlando Pirates F.C. entered the 2020-21 CAF Confederation Cup first round, as they had 8pts from the 2018-19 CAF Champions League run.

=== First round ===
22 December 2020	Sagrada Esperança (Angola)	0–1	(South Africa) Orlando Pirates	Estádio dos Coqueiros, Luanda
15:00 UTC+1		Report	Lorch 73'	Referee: Audrick Nkole (Zambia)

6 January 2021	Orlando Pirates (South Africa)	Cancelled	(Angola) Sagrada Esperança	Johannesburg Stadium, Johannesburg
19:00 UTC+2		Report

Orlando Pirates won on walkover after Sagrada Esperança withdrew from the second leg in South Africa citing health concerns caused due to the new COVID-19 variant.

=== Play-off round ===
14 February 2021	Jwaneng Galaxy (Botswana)	0–3	(South Africa) Orlando Pirates	Botswana National Stadium, Gaborone
15:00 UTC+2		Report	Hlatshwayo 32'; Mntambo 77'; Mundele 84'	Referee: Mathews Hamalila (Zambia)

21 February 2021	Orlando Pirates (South Africa)	1–0	(Botswana) Jwaneng Galaxy	Orlando Stadium, Soweto
17:00 UTC+2	Mntambo 55'	Report		Referee: Norman Matemera (Zimbabwe)

Orlando Pirates won 4–0 on aggregate

=== Group stage ===
Orlando Pirates F.C. were drawn into group A, after securing a slot from the play-off round.

=== Group A ===
Orlando Pirates F.C. finished the group as Runners-up.

Pos	Team	Pld	W	D	L	GF	GA	GD	Pts	Qualification	ENY	ORL	ESS	AHL
1	(Nigeria) Enyimba	6	3	0	3	6	8	−2	9 (Note: Tied on head-to-head points (3), on head-to-head goal difference (0) and on head-to-head goals scored (2). Head-to-head away goals scored: Enyimba 1, Orlando Pirates 0.)	Advance to knockout stage	—	1–0	2–1	2–1
2	(South Africa) Orlando Pirates	6	2	3	1	5	2	+3	9	Advance to knockout stage	2–1	—	0–0	3–0
3	(Algeria) ES Sétif	6	2	2	2	5	3	+2	8		3–0	0–0	—	1–0
4	(Libya) Al Ahly Benghazi	6	2	1	3	3	6	−3	7		1–0	0–0	1–0	—

Source: Soccerway
Rules for classification: Group stage tiebreakers
Notes:

10 March 2021	ES Sétif (Algeria)	0–0	(South Africa) Orlando Pirates	Accra Sports Stadium, Accra (Ghana) (Note: The ES Sétif v Orlando Pirates match, originally scheduled to be played at Stade 8 Mai 1945, Sétif, was played outside Algeria at Accra Sports Stadium, Accra (Ghana) due to restrictions related to the COVID-19 pandemic imposed by Algeria on travelers from South Africa out of concern of the variant 501.V2.)
19:00 (19:00 UTC+0)		Report		Referee: Bakary Gassama (Gambia)

17 March 2021	Orlando Pirates (South Africa)	2–1	(Nigeria) Enyimba	Orlando Stadium, Johannesburg
16:00 (18:00 UTC+2)	Hotto 27'; Mabasa 89'	Report	Oladapo 45+2' (pen.)	Referee: Blaise Yuven Ngwa (Cameroon)

4 April 2021	Al Ahly Benghazi (Libya)	0–0	(South Africa) Orlando Pirates	Benina Martyrs Stadium, Benghazi
19:00 (21:00 UTC+2)		Report		Referee: Mahmood Ismail (Sudan)

11 April 2021	Orlando Pirates (South Africa)	3–0	(Libya) Al Ahly Benghazi	Orlando Stadium, Johannesburg
16:00 (18:00 UTC+2)	Nyauza 26'; Mabasa 41'; Dlamini 69'	Report		Referee: Kalilou Traoré (Ivory Coast)

21 April 2021	Orlando Pirates (South Africa)	0–0	(Algeria) ES Sétif	Orlando Stadium, Johannesburg
13:00 (15:00 UTC+2)		Report		Referee: Celso Alvação (Mozambique)

28 April 2021	Enyimba (Nigeria)	1–0	(South Africa) Orlando Pirates	Enyimba International Stadium, Aba
21:00 (22:00 UTC+1)	Olisema 90+5'	Report		Referee: Helder Martins de Carvalho (Angola)

=== Quarter-finals ===
16 May 2021	Orlando Pirates (South Africa)	1–1	(Morocco) Raja Casablanca	Orlando Stadium, Johannesburg
13:00 (15:00 UTC+2)	Pule 39'	Report	Malango 60'	Referee: Peter Waweru (Kenya)

23 May 2021	Raja Casablanca (Morocco)	4–0	(South Africa) Orlando Pirates	Stade Mohammed V, Casablanca
16:00 (17:00 UTC+1)	Malango 6', 36'; El Wardi 22'; Rahimi 31'	Report		Referee: Mustapha Ghorbal (Algeria)

Raja Casablanca won 5–1 on aggregate.

=== Summary ===
Orlando Pirates F.C. CAF Confederation Cup run came to an end after being eliminated by Moroccan Club Raja Casablanca.

== Club awards ==
Orlando Pirates F.C. Season Awards :

Player of the Season - Deon Hotto and Vincent Pule (Tie)

Fan's player of the season - Deon Hotto and Vincent Pule (Tie)

Golden Boot Winner - Vincent Pule (9 goals in all competitions )

Prospect of the Season - Boitumelo Radiopane (MDC)

Goal of the Season - Vincent Pule on the turn vs Kaizer Chiefs F.C.

Save of the Season - Last minute save by Richard Ofori vs Bloemfontein Celtic F.C.
