= 2018–19 CAF Champions League qualifying rounds =

- Dates: 27 November – 23 December 2018

The 2018–19 CAF Champions League qualifying rounds were played from 27 November to 23 December 2018. A total of 56 teams competed in the qualifying rounds to decide 15 of the 16 places in the group stage of the 2018–19 CAF Champions League.

== Draw ==
The draw for the preliminary round and first round was held on 3 November 2018 in Rabat, Morocco, and was officially announced by the CAF on 9 November due to a special situation with the transitional calendar.

The entry round of the 56 teams entered into the draw was determined by their performances in the CAF competitions for the previous five seasons (CAF 5-year ranking points shown in parentheses).

| Entry round | First round (4 teams) | Preliminary round (52 teams) |
|---|---|---|
| Teams | (Democratic Republic of the Congo) TP Mazembe (66 pts); (Egypt) Al-Ahly (Note: At the time of the qualifying round draw, the 2018 CAF Champions League Final had not been completed, and thus the identity of the Champions League runners-up which were given a bye to the first round was not known (the Champions League winners were given a bye to the group stage due to their participation in the 2018 FIFA Club World Cup).) (62 pts); (Morocco) Wydad AC (51 pts); (Democratic Republic of the Congo) AS Vita Club (Note: AS Vita Club were given a bye to the first round due to their participation in the 2018 CAF Confederation Cup Final.) (29 pts) | (South Africa) Mamelodi Sundowns (40 pts); (Zambia) ZESCO United (30 pts); (Angola) 1º de Agosto (20 pts); (Guinea) Horoya (19 pts); (Sudan) Al-Hilal (16.5 pts); (Sudan) Al-Merrikh (16 pts); (Tunisia) Club Africain (12 pts); (Eswatini) Mbabane Swallows (9 pts); (Ivory Coast) ASEC Mimosas (8.5 pts); (South Africa) Orlando Pirates (8 pts); (Cameroon) Coton Sport (7 pts); (Botswana) Township Rollers (5 pts); (Kenya) Gor Mahia (5 pts); (Mozambique) UD Songo (5 pts); (Mali) Stade Malien (2 pts); (Libya) Al-Ahly Benghazi (1 pt); (Zambia) Nkana (1 pt); (Egypt) Ismaily; (Morocco) Ittihad Tanger; (Algeria) CS Constantine; (Algeria) JS Saoura; (Libya) Al-Nasr; (Cameroon) UMS de Loum; (Ivory Coast) SC Gagnoa; (Ethiopia) Jimma Aba Jifar; (Nigeria) Lobi Stars; (Republic of the Congo) AS Otohô; (Uganda) Vipers; (Zimbabwe) FC Platinum; (Tanzania) Simba; (Burundi) Le Messager Ngozi; (Burkina Faso) ASF Bobo Dioulasso; (Central African Republic) Stade Centrafricaine; (Chad) Elect-Sport; (Comoros) Volcan Club; ASAS Djibouti Télécom; (Equatorial Guinea) Leones Vegetarianos; (Gabon) AS Mangasport; (The Gambia) GAMTEL; (Lesotho) Bantu; (Liberia) Barrack Young Controllers; (Madagascar) CNaPS Sport; (Malawi) Nyasa Big Bullets; (Mauritania) FC Nouadhibou; (Namibia) African Stars; (Niger) AS SONIDEP; (Rwanda) APR; (Senegal) ASC Diaraf; (Seychelles) Light Stars; (South Sudan) Al-Hilal Wau; (Togo) US Koroki; (Zanzibar) JKU |

== Format ==
In the qualifying rounds, each tie was played on a home-and-away two-legged basis. If the aggregate score was tied after the second leg, the away goals rule would be applied, and if still tied, extra time would not be played, and the penalty shoot-out would be used to determine the winner (Regulations III. 13 & 14).

== Schedule ==
The schedule of each round was as follows (matches scheduled in midweek in italics).

| Round | First leg | Second leg |
|---|---|---|
| Preliminary round | 27–28 November 2018 | 4–5 December 2018 |
| First round | 14–16 December 2018 | 21–23 December 2018 |

== Bracket ==
The bracket of the draw was announced by the CAF on 9 November 2018. The 15 winners of the first round advanced to the group stage to join Espérance de Tunis, who received a bye to the group stage as the title holders, while the 15 losers of the first round entered the Confederation Cup play-off round.

Preliminary round
1 | (Morocco) Wydad AC | Bye
4
3 | (Senegal) ASC Diaraf | 1 | 0 | 1 (4 p)
2 | (Togo) US Koroki | 0 | 1 | 1 (2 p)

First round
(Morocco) Wydad AC | 2 | 1 | 3 (a)
(Senegal) ASC Diaraf | 0 | 3 | 3

Preliminary round
1 | (Algeria) JS Saoura | 2 | 0 | 2
4 | (Ivory Coast) SC Gagnoa | 0 | 0 | 0
3 | (Morocco) Ittihad Tanger | 1 | 0 | 1
2 | (Chad) Elect-Sport | 0 | 0 | 0

First round
(Algeria) JS Saoura | 2 | 0 | 2
(Morocco) Ittihad Tanger | 0 | 1 | 1

Preliminary round
1 | (Burundi) Le Messager Ngozi | 0 | 1 | 1
4 | (Egypt) Ismaily | 1 | 2 | 3
3 | (Burkina Faso) ASF Bobo Dioulasso | 3 | 1 | 4 (3 p)
2 | (Cameroon) Coton Sport | 1 | 3 | 4 (5 p)

First round
(Egypt) Ismaily | 2 | 1 | 3
(Cameroon) Coton Sport | 0 | 2 | 2

Preliminary round
1 | (Democratic Republic of the Congo) TP Mazembe | Bye
4
3 | (Niger) AS SONIDEP | 1 | 0 | 1
2 | (Zambia) ZESCO United | 2 | 3 | 5

First round
(Democratic Republic of the Congo) TP Mazembe | 1 | 1 | 2
(Zambia) ZESCO United | 0 | 1 | 1

Preliminary round
1 | (South Africa) Orlando Pirates | 5 | 3 | 8
4 | (Seychelles) Light Stars | 1 | 1 | 2
3 | (Comoros) Volcan Club | 0 | 1 | 1
2 | (Namibia) African Stars | 0 | 2 | 2

First round
(South Africa) Orlando Pirates | 0 | 1 | 1
(Namibia) African Stars | 0 | 0 | 0

Preliminary round
1 | (Mauritania) FC Nouadhibou | 2 | 0 | 2
4 | (Libya) Al-Ahly Benghazi | 1 | 2 | 3
3 | (Equatorial Guinea) Leones Vegetarianos | 0 | 1 | 1
2 | (South Africa) Mamelodi Sundowns | 2 | 5 | 7

First round
(Libya) Al-Ahly Benghazi | 0 | 0 | 0
(South Africa) Mamelodi Sundowns | 0 | 4 | 4

Preliminary round
1 | (Kenya) Gor Mahia | 1 | 0 | 1 (4 p)
4 | (Malawi) Big Bullets | 0 | 1 | 1 (3 p)
3 | (Cameroon) UMS de Loum | 1 | 0 | 1
2 | (Nigeria) Lobi Stars | 0 | 2 | 2

First round
(Kenya) Gor Mahia | 3 | 0 | 3
(Nigeria) Lobi Stars | 1 | 2 | 3 (a)

Preliminary round
1 | (Mozambique) UD Songo | 1 | 0 | 1
4 | (Zambia) Nkana | 2 | 1 | 3
3 | (Tanzania) Simba | 4 | 4 | 8
2 | (Eswatini) Mbabane Swallows | 1 | 0 | 1

First round
(Zambia) Nkana | 2 | 1 | 3
(Tanzania) Simba | 1 | 3 | 4

Preliminary round
1 | (Egypt) Al-Ahly | Bye
4
3 | ASAS Djibouti Télécom | 1 | 2 | 3
2 | (Ethiopia) Jimma Aba Jifar | 3 | 2 | 5

First round
(Egypt) Al-Ahly | 2 | 0 | 2
(Ethiopia) Jimma Aba Jifar | 0 | 1 | 1

Preliminary round
1 | (Algeria) CS Constantine | 0 | 1 | 1
4 | (The Gambia) GAMTEL | 0 | 0 | 0
3 | (Sudan) Al-Merrikh | 2 | 0 | 2
2 | (Uganda) Vipers | 1 | 1 | 2 (a)

First round
(Algeria) CS Constantine | 1 | 2 | 3
(Uganda) Vipers | 0 | 0 | 0

Preliminary round
1 | (Central African Republic) Stade Centrafricaine | 0 | 0 | 0
4 | (Mali) Stade Malien | 1 | 4 | 5
3 | (Ivory Coast) ASEC Mimosas | 1 | 0 | 1
2 | (Gabon) AS Mangasport | 0 | 0 | 0

First round
(Mali) Stade Malien | 0 | 0 | 0
(Ivory Coast) ASEC Mimosas | 1 | 1 | 2

Preliminary round
1 | (Democratic Republic of the Congo) AS Vita Club | Bye
4
3 | (Botswana) Township Rollers | 1 | 1 | 2 (2 p)
2 | (Lesotho) Bantu | 1 | 1 | 2 (4 p)

First round
(Democratic Republic of the Congo) AS Vita Club | 4 | 1 | 5
(Lesotho) Bantu | 1 | 1 | 2

Preliminary round
1 | (Rwanda) APR | 0 | 1 | 1
4 | (Tunisia) Club Africain | 0 | 3 | 3
3 | (Sudan) Al-Hilal | 4 | 2 | 6
2 | (Zanzibar) JKU | 0 | 0 | 0

First round
(Tunisia) Club Africain | 3 | 0 | 3
(Sudan) Al-Hilal | 1 | 1 | 2

Preliminary round
1 | (Libya) Al-Nasr | 5 | 4 | 9
4 | (South Sudan) Al-Hilal Wau | 1 | 2 | 3
3 | (Guinea) Horoya | 1 | 1 | 2
2 | (Liberia) Barrack Young Controllers | 0 | 0 | 0

First round
(Libya) Al-Nasr | 3 | 2 | 5
(Guinea) Horoya | 0 | 6 | 6

Preliminary round
1 | (Angola) 1º de Agosto | 4 | 0 | 4
4 | (Republic of the Congo) AS Otohô | 2 | 2 | 4 (a)
3 | (Madagascar) CNaPS Sport | 1 | 0 | 1
2 | (Zimbabwe) FC Platinum | 1 | 1 | 2

First round
(Republic of the Congo) AS Otohô | 1 | 0 | 1
(Zimbabwe) FC Platinum | 1 | 0 | 1 (a)

== Preliminary round ==
The preliminary round included the 54 teams that did not receive byes to the first round.

| Team 1 | Agg. | Team 2 | 1st leg | 2nd leg |
|---|---|---|---|---|
| ASC Diaraf (Senegal) | 1–1 (4–2 p) | (Togo) US Koroki | 1–0 | 0–1 |
| JS Saoura (Algeria) | 2–0 | (Ivory Coast) SC Gagnoa | 2–0 | 0–0 |
| Ittihad Tanger (Morocco) | 1–0 | (Chad) Elect-Sport | 1–0 | 0–0 |
| Le Messager Ngozi (Burundi) | 1–3 | (Egypt) Ismaily | 0–1 | 1–2 |
| ASF Bobo Dioulasso (Burkina Faso) | 4–4 (3–5 p) | (Cameroon) Coton Sport | 3–1 | 1–3 |
| AS SONIDEP (Niger) | 1–5 | (Zambia) ZESCO United | 1–2 | 0–3 |
| Orlando Pirates (South Africa) | 8–2 | (Seychelles) Light Stars | 5–1 | 3–1 |
| Volcan Club (Comoros) | 1–2 | (Namibia) African Stars | 0–0 | 1–2 |
| FC Nouadhibou (Mauritania) | 2–3 | (Libya) Al-Ahly Benghazi | 2–1 | 0–2 |
| Leones Vegetarianos (Equatorial Guinea) | 1–7 | (South Africa) Mamelodi Sundowns | 0–2 | 1–5 |
| Gor Mahia (Kenya) | 1–1 (4–3 p) | (Malawi) Nyasa Big Bullets | 1–0 | 0–1 |
| UMS de Loum (Cameroon) | 1–2 | (Nigeria) Lobi Stars | 1–0 | 0–2 |
| UD Songo (Mozambique) | 1–3 | (Zambia) Nkana | 1–2 | 0–1 |
| Simba (Tanzania) | 8–1 | (Eswatini) Mbabane Swallows | 4–1 | 4–0 |
| ASAS Djibouti Télécom | 3–5 | (Ethiopia) Jimma Aba Jifar | 1–3 | 2–2 |
| CS Constantine (Algeria) | 1–0 | (The Gambia) GAMTEL | 0–0 | 1–0 |
| Al-Merrikh (Sudan) | 2–2 (a) | (Uganda) Vipers | 2–1 | 0–1 |
| Stade Centrafricaine (Central African Republic) | 0–5 | (Mali) Stade Malien | 0–1 | 0–4 |
| ASEC Mimosas (Ivory Coast) | 1–0 | (Gabon) AS Mangasport | 1–0 | 0–0 |
| Township Rollers (Botswana) | 2–2 (2–4 p) | (Lesotho) Bantu | 1–1 | 1–1 |
| APR (Rwanda) | 1–3 | (Tunisia) Club Africain | 0–0 | 1–3 |
| Al-Hilal (Sudan) | 6–0 | (Zanzibar) JKU | 4–0 | 2–0 |
| Al-Nasr (Libya) | 9–3 | (South Sudan) Al-Hilal Wau | 5–1 | 4–2 |
| Horoya (Guinea) | 2–0 | (Liberia) Barrack Young Controllers | 1–0 | 1–0 |
| 1º de Agosto (Angola) | 4–4 (a) | (Republic of the Congo) AS Otohô | 4–2 | 0–2 |
| CNaPS Sport (Madagascar) | 1–2 | (Zimbabwe) FC Platinum | 1–1 | 0–1 |

27 November 2018
17:00 UTC+0

| ASC Diaraf (Senegal) | 1–0 | (Togo) US Koroki |
|---|---|---|
| O. Guèye 2' | Report |

Stade Léopold Sédar Senghor, Dakar
Referee: Bangaly Konaté (Guinea)
4 December 2018
15:00 UTC+0

| US Koroki (Togo) | 1–0 | (Senegal) ASC Diaraf |
|---|---|---|
| Fofana 67' | Report |
Penalties
| Boukari (penalty missed); Oke (penalty missed) | 2–4 | Penalty scored |

Stade Municipal, Lomé
Referee: Ousmane Sidibé (Mali)

1–1 on aggregate. ASC Diaraf won 4–2 on penalties.

27 November 2018
17:45 UTC+1

| JS Saoura (Algeria) | 2–0 | (Ivory Coast) SC Gagnoa |
|---|---|---|
| Hammia 9' (pen.); Boulaouidet 51' (pen.) | Report |

Stade 20 Août 1955, Béchar
Referee: Haithem Kossaï (Tunisia)
5 December 2018
16:00 UTC+0

| SC Gagnoa (Ivory Coast) | 0–0 | (Algeria) JS Saoura |
|---|---|---|
| | Report |

Stade Robert Champroux, Abidjan
Referee: Boureima Sanogo (Burkina Faso)

JS Saoura won 2–0 on aggregate.

27 November 2018
20:00 UTC+1

| Ittihad Tanger (Morocco) | 1–0 | (Chad) Elect-Sport |
|---|---|---|
| Arjoune 45' (pen.) | Report |

Stade Ibn Batouta, Tangier
Referee: Mohamed Adel (Egypt)
5 December 2018
15:00 UTC+1

| Elect-Sport (Chad) | 0–0 | (Morocco) Ittihad Tanger |
|---|---|---|
| | Report |

Stade Omnisports Idriss Mahamat Ouya, N'Djamena
Referee: Douglas Kouete Lemouchele (Cameroon)

Ittihad Tanger won 1–0 on aggregate.

28 November 2018
15:00 UTC+2

| Le Messager Ngozi (Burundi) | 0–1 | (Egypt) Ismaily |
|---|---|---|
| | Report | Taha 55' |

Stade Urukundo, Ngozi
Referee: Sabri Mohamed Fadul (Sudan)
5 December 2018
17:00 UTC+2

| Ismaily (Egypt) | 2–1 | (Burundi) Le Messager Ngozi |
|---|---|---|
| Hamdy 32'; A. Magdy 64' | Report | Urasenga 44' (pen.) |

Ismailia Stadium, Ismailia
Referee: Abdulwahid Huraywidah (Libya)

Ismaily won 3–1 on aggregate.

27 November 2018
15:30 UTC+0

| ASF Bobo Dioulasso (Burkina Faso) | 3–1 | (Cameroon) Coton Sport |
|---|---|---|
| Hien 36', 63'; Sanou 69' | Report | Kalamou 33' |

Stade Général Aboubacar Sangoulé Lamizana, Bobo-Dioulasso
Referee: Issa Sy (Senegal)
4 December 2018
15:30 UTC+1

| Coton Sport (Cameroon) | 3–1 | (Burkina Faso) ASF Bobo Dioulasso |
|---|---|---|
| Daouda 21', 45'; Elimbi 82' | Report | Hien 75' |
Penalties
| Penalty scored | 5–3 | (penalty missed) Ouattara |

Stade Militaire, Yaoundé
Referee: David Ndong (Equatorial Guinea)

4–4 on aggregate. Coton Sport won 5–3 on penalties.

27 November 2018
16:30 UTC+1

| AS SONIDEP (Niger) | 1–2 | (Zambia) ZESCO United |
|---|---|---|
| Dognon 77' | Report | Osumanu 73'; Kambole 90+1' |

Stade Général Seyni Kountché, Niamey
Referee: Daniel Laryea (Ghana)
4 December 2018
15:00 UTC+2

| ZESCO United (Zambia) | 3–0 | (Niger) AS SONIDEP |
|---|---|---|
| Were 1', 55'; Kambole 25' | Report |

Levy Mwanawasa Stadium, Ndola
Referee: António Caluassi Dungula (Angola)

ZESCO United won 5–1 on aggregate.

28 November 2018
19:30 UTC+2

| Orlando Pirates (South Africa) | 5–1 | (Seychelles) Light Stars |
|---|---|---|
| Qalinge 25'; Mulenga 37'; Makola 41'; Shonga 87'; Mntambo 89' | Report | Ravo 17' |

Orlando Stadium, Johannesburg
Referee: Tirelo Mositwane (Botswana)
5 December 2018
16:00 UTC+4

| Light Stars (Seychelles) | 1–3 | (South Africa) Orlando Pirates |
|---|---|---|
| Esther 76' | Report | Mntambo 11'; Gabuza 58'; Mabaso 63' |

Stade d’Amitié, Praslin
Referee: Abdoul Kanoso (Madagascar)

Orlando Pirates won 8–2 on aggregate.

27 November 2018
15:00 UTC+3

| Volcan Club (Comoros) | 0–0 | (Namibia) African Stars |
|---|---|---|
| | Report |

Stade de Moroni, Moroni
Referee: Bilal Abdallah Ismael (Djibouti)
5 December 2018
19:00 UTC+2

| African Stars (Namibia) | 2–1 | (Comoros) Volcan Club |
|---|---|---|
| Mbewe 6'; Isaak 43' | Report | Solonaina 13' |

Sam Nujoma Stadium, Windhoek
Referee: Tinyiko Hlungwani (South Africa)

African Stars won 2–1 on aggregate.

28 November 2018
17:00 UTC+0

| FC Nouadhibou (Mauritania) | 2–1 | (Libya) Al-Ahly Benghazi |
|---|---|---|
| Voulany 5' (pen.); Ba 89' | Report | Daho 52' |

Stade Cheikha Ould Boïdiya, Nouakchott
Referee: Walid Djeridi (Tunisia)
5 December 2018
17:00 UTC+2

| Al-Ahly Benghazi (Libya) | 2–0 | (Mauritania) FC Nouadhibou |
|---|---|---|
| Kaboré 28'; Al-Wadawi 90' | Report |

Petro Sport Stadium, Cairo (Egypt) (Note: Teams from Libya are not allowed to host their home matches in their country due to security concerns.)
Referee: Karim Sabry (Morocco)

Al-Ahly Benghazi won 3–2 on aggregate.

28 November 2018
15:00 UTC+1

| Leones Vegetarianos (Equatorial Guinea) | 0–2 | (South Africa) Mamelodi Sundowns |
|---|---|---|
| | Report | Brockie 11'; Zwane 78' |

Estadio de Ebibeyin, Ebibeyin
Referee: André Kolissala (Central Africa Republic)
5 December 2018
19:30 UTC+2

| Mamelodi Sundowns (South Africa) | 5–1 | (Equatorial Guinea) Leones Vegetarianos |
|---|---|---|
| Brockie 4'; Sirino 18' (pen.); Kekana 56'; Meza 61'; Lakay 88' | Report | Sall 47' |

Loftus Versfeld Stadium, Pretoria
Referee: Nomore Murambiwa Musundire (Zimbabwe)

Mamelodi Sundowns won 7–1 on aggregate.

28 November 2018
19:00 UTC+3

| Gor Mahia (Kenya) | 1–0 | (Malawi) Nyasa Big Bullets |
|---|---|---|
| Ondiek 90' | Report |

Moi International Sports Centre, Kasarani
Referee: Adel Mukhtar Adam (Sudan)
5 December 2018
14:30 UTC+2

| Nyasa Big Bullets (Malawi) | 1–0 | (Kenya) Gor Mahia |
|---|---|---|
| Msowoya 55' | Report |
Penalties
| Msowoya (penalty scored); Gabeya (penalty missed); Lanjesi (penalty scored); Fodya (penalty scored); Zonda (penalty missed) | 3–4 | (penalty scored) Ondiek; (penalty scored) Mieno; (penalty scored) Omondi; (penalty scored) Shakava |

Kamuzu Stadium, Blantyre
Referee: Tewodros Mitiku (Ethiopia)

1–1 on aggregate. Gor Mahia won 4–3 on penalties.

28 November 2018
15:30 UTC+1

| UMS de Loum (Cameroon) | 1–0 | (Nigeria) Lobi Stars |
|---|---|---|
| Koa 63' | Report |

Stade Militaire, Yaoundé
Referee: Pousri Armi Alfred (Chad)
5 December 2018
16:00 UTC+1

| Lobi Stars (Nigeria) | 2–0 | (Cameroon) UMS de Loum |
|---|---|---|
| Sikiru 10'; Koné 68' (pen.) | Report |

Aper Aku Stadium, Makurdi
Referee: Kokou Ognankotan Ntale (Togo)

Lobi Stars won 2–1 on aggregate.

28 November 2018
15:00 UTC+2

| UD Songo (Mozambique) | 1–2 | (Zambia) Nkana |
|---|---|---|
| Awasa 89' | Report | Chisala 34'; Mbewe 80' |

Estádio do Ferroviário, Beira
Referee: Osiase Koto (Lesotho)
5 December 2018
15:00 UTC+2

| Nkana (Zambia) | 1–0 | (Mozambique) UD Songo |
|---|---|---|
| K. Kampamba 45+2' (pen.) | Report |

Nkana Stadium, Kitwe
Referee: Thando Ndzandzeka (South Africa)

Nkana won 3–1 on aggregate.

28 November 2018
16:00 UTC+3

| Simba (Tanzania) | 4–1 | (Eswatini) Mbabane Swallows |
|---|---|---|
| Bocco 8', 33' (pen.); Kagere 84'; Chama 90+1' | Report | Nzambé 24' |

National Stadium, Dar es Salaam
Referee: Pacifique Ndabihawenimana (Burundi)
4 December 2018
15:30 UTC+2

| Mbabane Swallows (Eswatini) | 0–4 | (Tanzania) Simba |
|---|---|---|
| | Report | Chama 28', 32'; Okwi 51'; Kagere 62' |

Mavuso Sports Centre, Manzini
Referee: Nelson Fred (Seychelles)

Simba won 8–1 on aggregate.

27 November 2018
18:00 UTC+3

| ASAS Djibouti Télécom | 1–3 | (Ethiopia) Jimma Aba Jifar |
|---|---|---|
| Odutola 53' | Report | Girma 2'; Sidibé 7', 75' |

El Hadj Hassan Gouled Aptidon Stadium, Djibouti
Referee: Tsegay Mogos Teklu (Eritrea)
4 December 2018
16:00 UTC+3

| Jimma Aba Jifar (Ethiopia) | 2–2 | ASAS Djibouti Télécom |
|---|---|---|
| Sidibé 18'; Lebri 54' | Report | Mahabeh 2'; Odutola 69' |

Addis Ababa Stadium, Addis Ababa
Referee: Peter Waweru (Kenya)

Jimma Aba Jifar won 5–3 on aggregate.

27 November 2018
17:00 UTC+1

| CS Constantine (Algeria) | 0–0 | (The Gambia) GAMTEL |
|---|---|---|
| | Report |

Mohamed Hamlaoui Stadium, Constantine
Referee: Babacar Sarr (Mauritania)
5 December 2018
16:00 UTC+0

| GAMTEL (The Gambia) | 0–1 | (Algeria) CS Constantine |
|---|---|---|
| | Report | Belkacemi 2' |

Independence Stadium, Bakau
Referee: Fabricio Duarte (Cape Verde)

CS Constantine won 1–0 on aggregate.

28 November 2018
19:30 UTC+2

| Al-Merrikh (Sudan) | 2–1 | (Uganda) Vipers |
|---|---|---|
| Al-Madina 86' (pen.); Tajeldin 87' | Report | Sserunkuma 89' |

Al-Merrikh Stadium, Omdurman
Referee: Abderazzek Arab (Algeria)
5 December 2018
16:00 UTC+3

| Vipers (Uganda) | 1–0 | (Sudan) Al-Merrikh |
|---|---|---|
| Ndugwa 46' | Report |

St Mary's Stadium, Wakiso Town
Referee: Abdoul Karim Twagirumukiza (Rwanda)

2–2 on aggregate. Vipers won on away goals.

27 November 2018
15:00 UTC+1

| Stade Centrafricaine (Central African Republic) | 0–1 | (Mali) Stade Malien |
|---|---|---|
| | Report | O. Traoré 52' |

Barthélemy Boganda Stadium, Bangui
Referee: Fitial Charel Just Kokolo (Congo)
5 December 2018
17:00 UTC+0

| Stade Malien (Mali) | 4–0 | (Central African Republic) Stade Centrafricaine |
|---|---|---|
| O. Traoré 10'; Samaké 35' (pen.); Gassama 54'; Koné 55' | Report |

Stade Modibo Kéïta, Bamako
Referee: George Rogers (Liberia)

Stade Malien won 5–0 on aggregate.

28 November 2018
16:00 UTC+0

| ASEC Mimosas (Ivory Coast) | 1–0 | (Gabon) AS Mangasport |
|---|---|---|
| Tapsoba 5' | Report |

Stade Robert Champroux, Abidjan
Referee: Hassane Abdou (Niger)
5 December 2018
15:30 UTC+1

| AS Mangasport (Gabon) | 0–0 | (Ivory Coast) ASEC Mimosas |
|---|---|---|
| | Report |

Stade d'Angondjé, Libreville
Referee: Jean Pierre Tshiamala Kabangu (DR Congo)

ASEC Mimosas won 1–0 on aggregate.

27 November 2018
19:30 UTC+2

| Township Rollers (Botswana) | 1–1 | (Lesotho) Bantu |
|---|---|---|
| Ditlhokwe 58' | Report | L. Marabe 60' |

Lobatse Stadium, Lobatse
Referee: Audrick Nkole (Zambia)
4 December 2018
18:00 UTC+2

| Bantu (Lesotho) | 1–1 | (Botswana) Township Rollers |
|---|---|---|
| Kalake 30' | Report | Tshireletso 16' |
Penalties
| Kalake (penalty scored); Phungulwa (penalty scored); Khooa (penalty scored); L. Marabe (penalty scored) | 4–2 | (penalty scored) Boy; (penalty missed) Gaolaolwe; (penalty scored) Mogorosi; (penalty missed) Cooper |

Setsoto Stadium, Maseru
Referee: Ali Adelaïd (Comoros)

2–2 on aggregate. Bantu won 4–2 on penalties.

28 November 2018
15:30 UTC+2

| APR (Rwanda) | 0–0 | (Tunisia) Club Africain |
|---|---|---|
| | Report |

Stade Régional Nyamirambo, Kigali
Referee: Thulani Sibandze (Eswatini)
4 December 2018
18:00 UTC+1

| Club Africain (Tunisia) | 3–1 | (Rwanda) APR |
|---|---|---|
| Khefifi 13'; Sasraku 64'; Imanishimwe 69' (o.g.) | Report | Hakizimana 27' (pen.) |

Stade Olympique de Radès, Tunis
Referee: Hicham Tiazi (Morocco)

Club Africain won 3–1 on aggregate.

27 November 2018
19:00 UTC+2

| Al-Hilal (Sudan) | 4–0 | (Zanzibar) JKU |
|---|---|---|
| Geovane 18'; Diarra 25'; Mbombo 44'; Boya 90+3' | Report |

Al-Hilal Stadium, Omdurman
Referee: Alex Muhabi (Uganda)
5 December 2018
16:00 UTC+3

| JKU (Zanzibar) | 0–2 | (Sudan) Al-Hilal |
|---|---|---|
| | Report | Shiboub 80' (pen.); Geovane 90+2' |

Amaan Stadium, Zanzibar City
Referee: Alier Michael James (South Sudan)

Al-Hilal won 6–0 on aggregate.

27 November 2018
18:00 UTC+2

| Al-Nasr (Libya) | 5–1 | (South Sudan) Al-Hilal Wau |
|---|---|---|
| A. Al-Haram 11'; Al-Mehdi 24', 35'; Abdelrhman 57'; Eisay 71' | Report | Bago 37' |

Petro Sport Stadium, Cairo (Egypt)
Referee: Lemma Nigussie (Ethiopia)
4 December 2018
16:00 UTC+3

| Al-Hilal Wau (South Sudan) | 2–4 | (Libya) Al-Nasr |
|---|---|---|
| Dehiya 64'; Manyuat 90' | Report | Al-Mehdi 5', 23'; Al-Duweekh 6'; Magdi 89' |

Juba Stadium, Juba
Referee: Mohamed Maarouf (Egypt)

Al-Nasr won 9–3 on aggregate.

28 November 2018
17:00 UTC+0

| Horoya (Guinea) | 1–0 | (Liberia) Barrack Young Controllers |
|---|---|---|
| Nikièma 75' | Report |

Stade du 28 Septembre, Conakry
Referee: Omar Sallah (Gambia)
4 December 2018
16:00 UTC+0

| Barrack Young Controllers (Liberia) | 0–1 | (Guinea) Horoya |
|---|---|---|
| | Report | Sakin 74' |

Antoinette Tubman Stadium, Monrovia
Referee: Gilberto dos Santos (Guinea-Bissau)

Horoya won 2–0 on aggregate.

28 November 2018
16:00 UTC+1

| 1º de Agosto (Angola) | 4–2 | (Republic of the Congo) AS Otohô |
|---|---|---|
| Bokamba 29'; Geraldo 38' (pen.), 60'; Bitumba 88' | Report | Kivutuka 21'; Konté 25' |

Estádio 11 de Novembro, Luanda
Referee: Ganesh Chutooree (Mauritius)
5 December 2018
15:30 UTC+1

| AS Otohô (Republic of the Congo) | 2–0 | (Angola) 1º de Agosto |
|---|---|---|
| Bagayoko 45+2' (pen.); Mbenza 90+2' | Report |

Stade Omnisport Marien Ngouabi d'Owando, Owando
Referee: Pierre Atcho (Gabon)

4–4 on aggregate. AS Otohô won on away goals.

28 November 2018
14:30 UTC+3

| CNaPS Sport (Madagascar) | 1–1 | (Zimbabwe) FC Platinum |
|---|---|---|
| Rakotondrazaka 64' (pen.) | Report | Madhanaga 69' |

Vontovorona Stadium, Antananarivo
Referee: Jonas Shongedi (Namibia)
5 December 2018
15:00 UTC+2

| FC Platinum (Zimbabwe) | 1–0 | (Madagascar) CNaPS Sport |
|---|---|---|
| Chinyengetere 61' | Report |

Mandava Stadium, Zvishavane
Referee: Lemma Nigussie (Ethiopia)

FC Platinum won 2–1 on aggregate.

== First round ==
The first round included 30 teams: the 4 teams that received byes to this round, and the 26 winners of the preliminary round.

| Team 1 | Agg. | Team 2 | 1st leg | 2nd leg |
|---|---|---|---|---|
| Wydad AC (Morocco) | 3–3 (a) | (Senegal) ASC Diaraf | 2–0 | 1–3 |
| JS Saoura (Algeria) | 2–1 | (Morocco) Ittihad Tanger | 2–0 | 0–1 |
| Ismaily (Egypt) | 3–2 | (Cameroon) Coton Sport | 2–0 | 1–2 |
| TP Mazembe (Democratic Republic of the Congo) | 2–1 | (Zambia) ZESCO United | 1–0 | 1–1 |
| Orlando Pirates (South Africa) | 1–0 | (Namibia) African Stars | 0–0 | 1–0 |
| Al-Ahly Benghazi (Libya) | 0–4 | (South Africa) Mamelodi Sundowns | 0–0 | 0–4 |
| Gor Mahia (Kenya) | 3–3 (a) | (Nigeria) Lobi Stars | 3–1 | 0–2 |
| Nkana (Zambia) | 3–4 | (Tanzania) Simba | 2–1 | 1–3 |
| Al-Ahly (Egypt) | 2–1 | (Ethiopia) Jimma Aba Jifar | 2–0 | 0–1 |
| CS Constantine (Algeria) | 3–0 | (Uganda) Vipers | 1–0 | 2–0 |
| Stade Malien (Mali) | 0–2 | (Ivory Coast) ASEC Mimosas | 0–1 | 0–1 |
| AS Vita Club (Democratic Republic of the Congo) | 5–2 | (Lesotho) Bantu | 4–1 | 1–1 |
| Club Africain (Tunisia) | 3–2 | (Sudan) Al-Hilal | 3–1 | 0–1 |
| Al-Nasr (Libya) | 5–6 | (Guinea) Horoya | 3–0 | 2–6 |
| AS Otohô (Republic of the Congo) | 1–1 (a) | (Zimbabwe) FC Platinum | 1–1 | 0–0 |

15 December 2018
19:00 UTC+1

| Wydad AC (Morocco) | 2–0 | (Senegal) ASC Diaraf |
|---|---|---|
| Jebor 18'; Nahiri 86' | Report |

Stade Mohammed V, Casablanca
Referee: Daniel Laryea (Ghana)
22 December 2018
17:00 UTC+0

| ASC Diaraf (Senegal) | 3–1 | (Morocco) Wydad AC |
|---|---|---|
| O. Guèye 18'; Diène 47'; Ba 88' | Report | Ounajem 54' (pen.) |

Stade Léopold Sédar Senghor, Dakar
Referee: Juste Ephrem Zio (Burkina Faso)

3–3 on aggregate. Wydad AC won on away goals.

15 December 2018
17:45 UTC+1

| JS Saoura (Algeria) | 2–0 | (Morocco) Ittihad Tanger |
|---|---|---|
| Hammia 68' (pen.); Konaté 79' | Report |

Stade 20 Août 1955, Béchar
Referee: Boubou Traoré (Mali)
23 December 2018
16:00 UTC+1

| Ittihad Tanger (Morocco) | 1–0 | (Algeria) JS Saoura |
|---|---|---|
| El Ouadi 47' | Report |

Stade Ibn Batouta, Tangier
Referee: Sékou Ahmed Touré (Guinea)

JS Saoura won 2–1 on aggregate.

16 December 2018
17:00 UTC+2

| Ismaily (Egypt) | 2–0 | (Cameroon) Coton Sport |
|---|---|---|
| El Mohamady 45'; Bambo 59' | Report |

Ismailia Stadium, Ismailia
Referee: Noureddine El Jaafari (Morocco)
22 December 2018
15:30 UTC+1

| Coton Sport (Cameroon) | 2–1 | (Egypt) Ismaily |
|---|---|---|
| Foé 43'; Daouda 64' (pen.) | Report | El Mohamady 3' (pen.) |

Stade Militaire, Yaoundé
Referee: Maudo Jallow (Gambia)

Ismaily won 3–2 on aggregate.

16 December 2018
15:30 UTC+2

| TP Mazembe (Democratic Republic of the Congo) | 1–0 | (Zambia) ZESCO United |
|---|---|---|
| Muleka 19' | Report |

Stade TP Mazembe, Lubumbashi
Referee: El Fadil Mohamed (Sudan)
22 December 2018
15:00 UTC+2

| ZESCO United (Zambia) | 1–1 | (Democratic Republic of the Congo) TP Mazembe |
|---|---|---|
| Kambole 13' | Report | Mputu 49' |

Levy Mwanawasa Stadium, Ndola
Referee: Louis Hakizimana (Rwanda)

TP Mazembe won 2–1 on aggregate.

15 December 2018
18:00 UTC+2

| Orlando Pirates (South Africa) | 0–0 | (Namibia) African Stars |
|---|---|---|
| | Report |

Orlando Stadium, Johannesburg
Referee: Nelson Fred (Seychelles)
22 December 2018
16:00 UTC+2

| African Stars (Namibia) | 0–1 | (South Africa) Orlando Pirates |
|---|---|---|
| | Report | Shonga 55' |

Sam Nujoma Stadium, Windhoek
Referee: Ahmad Imtehaz Heeralall (Mauritius)

Orlando Pirates won 1–0 on aggregate.

16 December 2018
17:00 UTC+2

| Al-Ahly Benghazi (Libya) | 0–0 | (South Africa) Mamelodi Sundowns |
|---|---|---|
| | Report |

Petro Sport Stadium, Cairo (Egypt)
Referee: Rédouane Jiyed (Morocco)
22 December 2018
15:00 UTC+2

| Mamelodi Sundowns (South Africa) | 4–0 | (Libya) Al-Ahly Benghazi |
|---|---|---|
| Sirino 34'; Brockie 43'; Laffor 50'; Meza 79' | Report |

Loftus Versfeld Stadium, Pretoria
Referee: Joshua Bondo (Botswana)

Mamelodi Sundowns won 4–0 on aggregate.

16 December 2018
16:00 UTC+3

| Gor Mahia (Kenya) | 3–1 | (Nigeria) Lobi Stars |
|---|---|---|
| Tuyisenge 7'; Onyango 22', 33' | Report | Mathias 30' |

Moi International Sports Centre, Kasarani
Referee: Slim Belkhouas (Tunisia)
22 December 2018
15:00 UTC+1

| Lobi Stars (Nigeria) | 2–0 | (Kenya) Gor Mahia |
|---|---|---|
| Sikiru 70', 87' | Report |

Nnamdi Azikiwe Stadium, Enugu
Referee: Tinyiko Hlungwani (South Africa)

3–3 on aggregate. Lobi Stars won on away goals.

16 December 2018
15:00 UTC+2

| Nkana (Zambia) | 2–1 | (Tanzania) Simba |
|---|---|---|
| R. Kampamba 29'; K. Kampamba 57' | Report | Bocco 75' (pen.) |

Nkana Stadium, Kitwe
Referee: Salisu Basheer (Nigeria)
23 December 2018
16:00 UTC+3

| Simba (Tanzania) | 3–1 | (Zambia) Nkana |
|---|---|---|
| Mkude 29'; Kagere 45+1'; Chama 89' | Report | Bwalya 17' |

National Stadium, Dar es Salaam
Referee: Peter Waweru (Kenya)

Simba won 4–3 on aggregate.

14 December 2018
18:00 UTC+2

| Al-Ahly (Egypt) | 2–0 | (Ethiopia) Jimma Aba Jifar |
|---|---|---|
| Maher 7'; M. Mohsen 38' | Report |

Borg El Arab Stadium, Alexandria
Attendance: 10,000
Referee: Sadok Selmi (Tunisia)
23 December 2018
16:00 UTC+3

| Jimma Aba Jifar (Ethiopia) | 1–0 | (Egypt) Al-Ahly |
|---|---|---|
| Lebri 45' | Report |

Addis Ababa Stadium, Addis Ababa
Referee: Hassan Mohamed Hagi (Somalia)

Al-Ahly won 2–1 on aggregate.

14 December 2018
19:00 UTC+1

| CS Constantine (Algeria) | 1–0 | (Uganda) Vipers |
|---|---|---|
| Beldjilali 14' | Report |

Mohamed Hamlaoui Stadium, Constantine
Referee: Maguette N'Diaye (Senegal)
22 December 2018
16:00 UTC+3

| Vipers (Uganda) | 0–2 | (Algeria) CS Constantine |
|---|---|---|
| | Report | Djabout 64'; Bencherifa 70' |

St Mary's Stadium, Wakiso Town
Referee: Amin Mohamed Omar (Egypt)

CS Constantine won 3–0 on aggregate.

15 December 2018
17:00 UTC+0

| Stade Malien (Mali) | 0–1 | (Ivory Coast) ASEC Mimosas |
|---|---|---|
| | Report | Touré 90' |

Stade Modibo Kéïta, Bamako
Referee: Youssef Essrayri (Tunisia)
23 December 2018
16:00 UTC+0

| ASEC Mimosas (Ivory Coast) | 1–0 | (Mali) Stade Malien |
|---|---|---|
| Tapsoba 38' | Report |

Stade Félix Houphouët-Boigny, Abidjan
Referee: Antoine Effa (Cameroon)

ASEC Mimosas won 2–0 on aggregate.

16 December 2018
15:30 UTC+1

| AS Vita Club (Democratic Republic of the Congo) | 4–1 | (Lesotho) Bantu |
|---|---|---|
| Kasengu 25'; Mundele 36', 53'; Lukombe 62' | Report | Molapo 58' |

Stade des Martyrs, Kinshasa
Referee: Hélder Martins de Carvalho (Angola)
23 December 2018
16:00 UTC+2

| Bantu (Lesotho) | 1–1 | (Democratic Republic of the Congo) AS Vita Club |
|---|---|---|
| Kalake 90+4' | Report | Muzinga 3' |

Setsoto Stadium, Maseru
Referee: Norman Matemera (Zimbabwe)

AS Vita Club won 5–2 on aggregate.

16 December 2018
17:00 UTC+1

| Club Africain (Tunisia) | 3–1 | (Sudan) Al-Hilal |
|---|---|---|
| Chamakhi 21' (pen.); Khefifi 60'; Darragi 90+1' | Report | Aldai 18' |

Stade Olympique de Radès, Tunis
Referee: Mustapha Ghorbal (Algeria)
23 December 2018
19:00 UTC+2

| Al-Hilal (Sudan) | 1–0 | (Tunisia) Club Africain |
|---|---|---|
| Shiboub 90+5' (pen.) | Report |

Al-Hilal Stadium, Omdurman
Referee: Pacifique Ndabihawenimana (Burundi)

Club Africain won 3–2 on aggregate.

14 December 2018
18:00 UTC+2

| Al-Nasr (Libya) | 3–0 | (Guinea) Horoya |
|---|---|---|
| Al-Mehdi 26', 85'; Assoko 65' (o.g.) | Report |

Osman Ahmed Osman Stadium, Cairo (Egypt)
Referee: Mahamadou Keita (Mali)
23 December 2018
17:00 UTC+0

| Horoya (Guinea) | 6–2 | (Libya) Al-Nasr |
|---|---|---|
| Wonkoye 4'; Sakin 41', 57'; Mandela 50'; Assoko 62'; Haba 90+3' | Report | Elajail 39'; Al-Mehdi 86' |

Stade du 28 Septembre, Conakry
Referee: Sidi Alioum (Cameroon)

Horoya won 6–5 on aggregate.

16 December 2018
15:30 UTC+1

| AS Otohô (Republic of the Congo) | 1–1 | (Zimbabwe) FC Platinum |
|---|---|---|
| Mbenza 18' | Report | Stima 47' |

Stade Omnisport Marien Ngouabi d'Owando, Owando
Referee: Kokou Ognankotan Ntale (Togo)
22 December 2018
15:00 UTC+2

| FC Platinum (Zimbabwe) | 0–0 | (Republic of the Congo) AS Otohô |
|---|---|---|
| | Report |

Mandava Stadium, Zvishavane
Referee: Souleiman Ahmed Djama (Djibouti)

1–1 on aggregate. FC Platinum won on away goals.
