= 2020 MTN 8 =

Tournament details
- Country: South Africa
- Dates: 17 October 2020 – 12 December 2020
- Teams: 8

Final positions
- Champions: Orlando Pirates (10th title)
- Runners-up: Bloemfontein Celtic

Tournament statistics
- Matches played: 9
- Goals scored: 20 (2.22 per match)
- Top goal scorer(s): (2 goals); Mogakolodi Ngele; Yagan Sasman; Ghampani Lungu; Thembinkosi Lorch

The 2020 MTN 8 was the 46th edition of South Africa's annual soccer cup competition, the MTN 8. It featured the top eight teams of the Premier Soccer League at the end of the 2019–20 season.

Supersport United were defending champions, but were eliminated in the Semifinal by Bloemfontein Celtic.

The competition was won by Orlando Pirates, ending a six-year trophy drought.

== Teams ==
The eight teams competing in the MTN 8 knockout competition are (listed according to their finishing position in the 2019/2020 Premier Soccer League Season):

1. Mamelodi Sundowns
2. Kaizer Chiefs
3. Orlando Pirates
4. Tshakhuma Tsha Madzivhandila (purchased the position from Bidvest Wits)
5. SuperSport United
6. Cape Town City
7. Maritzburg
8. Bloemfontein Celtic

== Quarter-finals ==
17 October 2020
15:00

Tshakhuma Tsha Madzivhandila	2–3	SuperSport United
Ngele 44', 56'	Report	8' Grobler; 28' Rayners; 33' Lungu

Thohoyandou Stadium, Thohoyandou
Attendance: 0
17 October 2020
18:00

Orlando Pirates	1–0	Cape Town City
Dzvukamanja 23'	Report

Orlando Stadium, Soweto, Johannesburg
Attendance: 0
18 October 2020
15:00

Kaizer Chiefs	2–1	Maritzburg United
Sasman 73', 75'	Report	32' Kutumela

FNB Stadium, Soweto, Johannesburg
Attendance: 0
Referee: Luxolo Badi
18 October 2020
18:00

Mamelodi Sundowns	0–1	Bloemfontein Celtic
	Report	69' Letsoalo

Lucas Moripe Stadium, Pretoria
Attendance: 0

== Semi-finals ==
31 October 2020
15:00

Orlando Pirates	3–0	Kaizer Chiefs
Z.Lepasa 26'; V.Pule 66'; T.Lorch 81'

Orlando Stadium, Soweto, Johannesburg
Attendance: 0(due to Covid-19)
Referee: Eugene Ndluli
1 November 2020
15:00

SuperSport United	1–1	Bloemfontein Celtic
G.Lungu 50'		14' N.Mabena

Lucas Masterpieces Moripe Stadium , Mamelodi
Attendance: 0

7 November 2020
15:00

Bloemfontein Celtic	1–0	Supersport United
V.Letsoalo 49'

Referee: Thando Nzanzeka

Bloemfontein Celtic won 2–1 on aggregate

8 November 2020
15:00

Kaizer Chiefs	0–2	Orlando Pirates
	Report	59' F.Makaringe; 80' L.Mntambo

FNB Stadium, Johannesburg

Orlando Pirates won 5–0 on aggregate

== Final ==
Bloemfontein Celtic	1-2	Orlando Pirates
Luthuli 4'	Report	Hotto 32'; Lorch 53'

Moses Mabhida Stadium, Durban, KZN
Referee: Luxolo Badi

Luthuli scores his goal after a corner kick for Bloemfontein Celtic in the 4th minute. Orlando Pirates player Thabang Monare received an injury and was replaced by Thembinkosi lorch. In the 32nd minutes, Hotto levels the matter for Orlando Pirates and the score was 1–1. After half time Thembinkosi lorch was fouled in the box and the referee called for a penalty in which was taken by lorch and made it 2–1 for Pirates scoring his second goal in the competition. The match ended in 2–1 and Pirates took the trophy ending their six-year trophy drought.

== Statistics ==
No	Player	Club	Goals
1	(Botswana) Mogakolodi Ngele	Tshakhuma	2
1	(South Africa) Victor Letsoalo	Bloem Celtic	2
1	(South Africa) Ghampani Lungu	Supersport United	2
1	(South Africa) Yagan Sasman	Kaizer Chiefs	2
1	(South Africa) Thembinkosi Lorch	Orlando Pirates	2
2	(Zimbabwe) Terrence Dzvukamanja	Orlando Pirates	1
2	(South Africa) Linda Mntambo	Orlando Pirates	1
2	(South Africa) Fortune Makaringe	Orlando Pirates	1
2	(South Africa) Vincent Pule	Orlando Pirates	1
2	(Namibia) Deon Hotto	Orlando Pirates	1
2	(South Africa) Zakhele Lepasa	Orlando Pirates	1
2	(South Africa) Iqraam Rayners	Supersport United	1
2	(South Africa) Bradley Grobler	Supersport United	1
2	(South Africa) Thabiso Kutumela	Maritzburg United	1
2	(South Africa) Ndumiso Mabena	Bloemfontein Celtic	1
