= Mntambo =

Mntambo is a South African surname. Notable people with the surname include:

- Linda Mntambo (born 1989), South African soccer player
- Nandipha Mntambo (born 1982), South African artist
