= Kwame Peprah =

Ghanaian footballer (born 2000)

Personal information
- Full name: Kwame Peprah
- Date of birth: 16 December 2000 (age 25)
- Place of birth: Kumasi, Ghana
- Height: 1.81 m (5 ft 11 in)
- Position: Forward

Team information
- Current team: Preah Khan Reach Svay Rieng
- Number: 46

Senior career*
Years	Team	Apps	(Gls)
2019–2021	King Faisal	43	(14)
2021–2023	Orlando Pirates	30	(7)
2023	→ Maritzburg United (loan)	9	(1)
2023	Hapoel Hadera	0	(0)
2023–2025	Kerala Blasters	35	(8)
2025–	Preah Khan Reach Svay Rieng	34	(29)

International career
2021	Ghana U23	4	(3)
- * Club domestic league appearances and goals as of 9 November 2026

Kwame Peprah (born 16 December 2000) is a Ghanaian professional footballer who plays as a forward for Cambodian Premier League club Preah Khan Reach Svay Rieng.

== Club career ==
=== King Faisal ===
Peprah started his professional career with Kumasi-based Ghana Premier League club King Faisal in 2019. In his first season with the club, he scored twice in 13 games. The following season, he became the club's main striker and gained prominence. Peprah became club's leading goal-scorer with 12 goals and also the league's second-highest goal-scorer during the 2020–21 season.

=== Orlando Pirates ===
On 26 August 2021, it was announced that Peprah had signed for South African Premier Division club Orlando Pirates. He was shortlisted for the league's Young Player of the Season award and was named as the Pirates' player of the season, after scoring 7 goals in his debut season.

==== Maritzburg United (loan) ====
In January 2023, he was sent on loan to Maritzburg United. On 3 February 2023, he scored on his debut against AmaZulu.

=== Hapoel Hadera ===
On 3 August 2023, Peprah signed for Israeli Premier League club Hapoel Hadera. He made his debut for the club on 6 August in a Toto Cup match against Maccabi Bnei Reineh, where he scored a goal. It was reported that Peprah only signed a short-term agreement with the club to be registered for the domestic cup with the option to leave on mutual consent, with a deadline set on 15 August 2023.

=== Kerala Blasters ===
On 20 August 2023, Indian Super League club Kerala Blasters announced the signing of Peprah on a two-year contract. He made his debut for the club on 21 September, in the season opener against Bengaluru FC at home, which the Blasters won 2–1. On 29 November, Peprah scored his debut goal for the Blasters in a 3–3 draw against Chennaiyin FC in the 38th minute. His next league goal would come on 24 December against Mumbai City, where he scored a goal and provided an assist to Diamantakos in a 2–0 win. He was subsequently chosen as the player of the match for his performance. Peprah would score a brace in his last match of the 2023–24 season in the 2024 Super Cup match against Shillong Lajong on 10 January 2024 in a 3–1 win. In the next cup match against Jamshedpur FC, Peprah suffered a groin injury, which ruled him out for the rest of the season.

Peprah made his return to the pitch in the following season in the club's first competitive match of season on 1 August in the 2024 Durand Cup match against MumbaI City FC, where Peprah, along with Noah Sadaoui, completed his hat-trick with three goals in 38th, 45th, and 53rd minutes, as the Blasters won the match with a record-breaking score of 8–0. He would score his fourth goal of the tournament in the Blasters' 7–0 win against CISF Protectors on 10 August. Peprah scored his first league goal of the season against East Bengal on 22 September, where he scored the winner for the Blasters as they won the match 2–1 at full-time. He scored his second goal of the season against Mohammedan SC on 20 August, where he came in as a substitute and scored the equalizer as the Blasters won the match by the score of 1–2. At the end of his two year spell, he had registered 14 goals and 5 assists in 43 appearances across all competitions.

=== Preah Khan Reach Svay Rieng ===
On 3 July 2025, Peprah signed a two‑year contract with Cambodian Premier League champions Preah Khan Reach Svay Rieng.

In August 2025, Peprah was instrumental in Preah Khan Reach Svay Rieng's triumph in the Cambodian Super Cup, scoring two goals in the final against Phnom Penh Crown to force a 2–2 draw. Svay Rieng went on to secure the trophy by winning 5–3 in the penalty shoot-out. His outstanding performance in the match earned him the Player of the Competition award.

During the 2025–26 Cambodian Premier League season, Peprah finished as the league's top scorers with 24 goals and helped Svay Rieng secure domestic success by winning the league. At the end of the season, he was named the Cambodian Premier League Best Player and was also included in the league's Best XI of the season.

Peprah also impressed in continental competition during the 2025–26 AFC Challenge League, where he played a key role in Svay Rieng's run to the final. He finished as the tournament's top scorer with eight goals. Svay Rieng eventually finished runners-up after losing 4–3 after extra time to Al-Kuwait in the final. His performances in both domestic and continental competitions earned widespread recognition in Cambodia and Ghana.

On 30 August 2026, Peprah scored the opening goal in Preah Khan Reach Svay Rieng's 2–1 victory over Visakha at Morodok Techo National Stadium to help the club win its third consecutive Cambodian Super Cup.

== International career ==
Peprah is a former Ghana U23 international. He was called up for friendlies against South Korea U23 and Japan U23 in 2021.

== Career statistics ==
=== Club ===
As of 26 October 2026

Club	Season	League			National Cup (Note: Includes Nedbank Cup, Super Cup)		Continental		Other		Total	
Club	Season	Division	Apps	Goals	Apps	Goals	Apps	Goals	Apps	Goals	Apps	Goal
King Faisal	2019–20	Ghana Premier League	13	2	—		—		—		13	2
King Faisal	2020–21	Ghana Premier League	30	12	—		—		—		30	12
King Faisal	Total		43	14	—		—		—		43	14
Orlando Pirates	2021–22	Premier Division	25	7	2	0	11 (Note: Appearance(s) in CAF Confederation Cup)	2	—		38	9
Orlando Pirates	2022–23	Premier Division	5	0	0	0	—		1 (Note: Appearance(s) in MTN 8)	0	6	0
Orlando Pirates	Total		30	7	2	0	11	2	1	0	44	9
Maritzburg United (loan)	2022–23	Premier Division	9	1	1	0	—		4 (Note: Appearance(s) in Play-offs)	0	14	1
Hapoel Hadera	2023–24	Israeli Premier League	0	0	0	0	—		2 (Note: Appearance(s) in Toto Cup)	1	2	1
Kerala Blasters	2023–24	Indian Super League	12	2	2	2	—		0	0	14	4
Kerala Blasters	2024–25	Indian Super League	23	6	2	0	—		4 (Note: Appearance(s) in Durand Cup)	4	29	10
Kerala Blasters	Total		35	8	4	2	—		4	4	43	14
Preah Khan Reach Svay Rieng	2025–26	Cambodian Premier League	28	24	—		8 (Note: Appearance(s) in AFC Challenge League)	8	1 (Note: Appearance(s) in Cambodian Super Cup)	2	42	35
Preah Khan Reach Svay Rieng	2026–27	Cambodian Premier League	5	3	0	0	3	1	1	1	10	5
Preah Khan Reach Svay Rieng	Total		33	27	0	0	11	9	2	3	52	40
Career total			150	57	7	2	22	11	13	8	198	79

== Honours ==
Orlando Pirates

- MTN 8: 2022
- CAF Confederation Cup runner-up: 2021–22
- Carling Black Label Cup runner-up: 2022

Preah Khan Reach Svay Rieng

- Cambodian Premier League: 2025–26
- Cambodian Super Cup: 2025, 2026
- AFC Challenge League runner up: 2025–26

Individual

- Cambodian Premier League Player of the season: 2025–26
- Cambodian Premier League Top scorer: 2025–26
- AFC Challenge League Top scorer: 2025–26
- Cambodian Premier League Player of the Month: August 2025
- Cambodian Super Cup Player of the Tournament: 2025
- Cambodian Premier League Best 11: 2025–26
