= Tshegofatso Mabaso =

South African soccer player

Tshegofatso Mabasa
Personal information
- Full name: Tshegofatso John Mabasa
- Date of birth: 1 October 1996 (age 30)
- Place of birth: Bloemfontein, South Africa
- Height: 1.79 m (5 ft 10 in)
- Position: Forward

Youth career
- Bloemfontein Celtic

Senior career*
Years	Team	Apps	(Gls)
2014–2019	Bloemfontein Celtic	49	(9)
2019–2026	Orlando Pirates	91	(50)
2022–2023	→ Sekhukhune United (loan)	18	(2)
2023–2024	→ Moroka Swallows (loan)	13	(6)
2026–2026	→ Stellenbosch (loan)	12	(4)
2026–	MAS		

International career^{‡}
- South Africa U23
2017–	South Africa	6	(3)
- * Club domestic league appearances and goals as of 04 August 2026 ‡ National team caps and goals as of 7 July 2023

Tshegofatso John Mabasa (born 1 October 1996) is a South African professional soccer player who plays as a forward for Botola Pro side Maghreb of Fez.

== Career ==
=== Club ===
Born in Bloemfontein, Mabasa's first career club was Bloemfontein Celtic. He made his first-team debut during a 2014 Telkom Knockout encounter with AmaZulu on 4 October, which was followed by his professional league debut in the South African Premier Division in May 2015 versus Free State Stars. In total, he made thirty-one appearances for the club in his first four seasons, during which time he also scored his first senior goals, netting in Telkom Knockout ties with Platinum Stars and Polokwane City in November 2017. His first goal in league action arrived on 5 August 2018 in a 2–0 win over Chippa United.

In the 2023/24 season he finished as a top goal scorer in the league while playing for Orlando Pirates.

Mabasa scored his Orlando Pirates's 2nd hat-trick, on 24 December 2024 against Marumo Gallants. This made him the second all-time scorer of Orlando Pirates with 50 goals for the club.

Mabasa was on loan to Stellenbosch F.C. from January 2026.

=== Maghreb of Fez ===
In August 2026 he signed with Botola Pro side Maghreb of Fez.

== International career ==
Mabasa has represented South Africa at senior level, winning his first cap during a 2018 African Nations Championship qualifier with Zambia on 19 August 2017. He had previously featured for the South Africa under-23s.

== Career statistics ==
=== Club ===
As of 17 September 2018.

Club statistics
Club	Season	League			Cup (Note: Includes the Nedbank Cup)		League Cup (Note: Includes the Telkom Knockout)		Continental		Other (Note: Includes the MTN 8)		Total	
Club	Season	Division	Apps	Goals	Apps	Goals	Apps	Goals	Apps	Goals	Apps	Goals	Apps	Goals
Bloemfontein Celtic	2014–15	Premier Division	1	0	0	0	1	0	—		0	0	2	0
Bloemfontein Celtic	2015–16	Premier Division	1	0	0	0	0	0	—		0	0	1	0
Bloemfontein Celtic	2016–17	Premier Division	12	0	1	0	0	0	—		0	0	13	0
Bloemfontein Celtic	2017–18	Premier Division	12	0	1	0	2	2	—		0	0	15	2
Bloemfontein Celtic	2018–19	Premier Division	23	9	3	1	1	0	—		0	0	27	10
Orlando Pirates	2019-20	Premier Division	22	7	0	0	1	0	-	-	2	0	25	7
Orlando Pirates	2020-21	Premier Division	11	5	1	1	1	0	6	2	-	-	19	8
Orlando Pirates	2021-22	Premier Division	16	2	1	0	0	0	5	1	-	-	22	3
Orlando Pirates	2023-24	Premier Division	13	10	5	3	-	-	-	-	-	-	18	13
Sekhukhune United (loan)	2022-23	Premier Division	18	2	2	0	-	-	-	-	-	-	20	2
Moroka Swallows (loan)	2023-24	Premier Division	13	6	-	-	1	0	-	-	1	0	16	6
Career total			142	41	11	4	7	2	11 3		3	0	178	51

=== International ===
As of match played 16 July 2023

Appearances and goals by national team and year
National team	Year	Apps	Goals
South Africa	2017	1	0
South Africa	2021	1	0
South Africa	2023	5	3
Total		7	3

Scores and results list South Africa's goal tally first, score column indicates score after each Mabasa goal.

List of international goals scored by Tshegofatso Mabasa
No.	Date	Venue	Opponent	Score	Result	Competition	Ref.
1	11 July 2023	Princess Magogo Stadium, KwaMashu, South Africa	Eswatini	1–1	2–1	2023 COSAFA Cup	
2	11 July 2023	Princess Magogo Stadium, KwaMashu, South Africa	Eswatini	2–1	2–1	2023 COSAFA Cup	
3	14 July 2023	King Zwelithini Stadium, Umlazi, South Africa	Zambia	1–0	1–2	2023 COSAFA Cup	
