= Bilel Khefifi =

Tunisian footballer

Personal information
- Date of birth: 2 September 1991 (age 35)
- Place of birth: Sfax, Tunisia
- Position: Forward

Team information
- Current team: US Ben Guerdane

Senior career*
Years	Team	Apps	(Gls)
2010–2023	CS Sfaxien		
2013–2015	AS Gabès	22	(0)
2015–2016	Olympique Béja		
2016–2017	US Ben Guerdane	20	(2)
2017–2020	Club Africain	59	(3)
2020–2021	CS Hammam-Lif		
2021–2022	Al-Salt		
2022	Jeddah		
2022–	US Ben Guerdane		
- * Club domestic league appearances and goals as of 17:10, 24 January 2022 (UTC)

Bilel Khefifi (Arabic: بلال الخفيفي; born 2 September 1991) is a Tunisian professional footballer who plays as a forward for US Ben Guerdane.

== Career ==
Khefifi previously played domestically for CS Sfaxien, AS Gabès, Olympique Béja, US Ben Guerdane and Club Africain.

He scored his first goal in CAF Champions League on 4 December 2018, against APR in 2018–19 qualifying rounds.

On 15 January 2022, Khefifi joined Saudi Arabian club Jeddah.

== Honours ==
Club Africain

- Tunisian Cup: 2017–18

CS Hammam-Lif

- Tunisian Ligue Professionnelle 2: 2020–21
