= F.C. Hunters =

Zimbabwean football club

- Ground: Rufaro Stadium
- Coach: Nesbert “Yabo” Saruchera
- League: Zimbabwe Premier Soccer League (ZPSL)
- 2025: 1st (champions, Zimbabwe Division One Eastern Region)

F.C. Hunters is a professional football club from Marondera that competes in the Zimbabwe Premier Soccer League (ZPSL).

The club was promoted to the ZPSL after winning the 2025 Eastern Region.

== Promotion ==
Following promotion to the ZPSL, a deal by another club, N'ombeyawora, to purchase Hunters' ZPSL license was considered. However, the deal was scuppered by the ZPSL, which invoked regulations barring individuals from owning multiple top-tier clubs. N'ombeyawora is owned by Scottland owner Scott Sakupwanya.

== Honours ==
- Eastern Region Soccer League
  - Champions (1): 2025
