= Mfundo Thikazi =

South African soccer player (born 1999)

Personal information
- Full name: Mfundo Langa Thikazi
- Date of birth: 23 June 1999 (age 27)
- Place of birth: KwaMashu, South Africa
- Height: 1.75 m (5 ft 9 in)
- Positions: Striker; winger

Team information
- Current team: Richards Bay
- Number: 34

Youth career
- TTM

Senior career*
| Years | Team | Apps | (Gls) |
| 2018–2019 | Royal Eagles | 1 | (0) |
| 2020–2025 | Royal AM | 95 | (14) |
| 2025– | Richards Bay | 11 | (0) |

International career^{‡}
| 2024– | South Africa | 2 | (0) |
- * Club domestic league appearances and goals as of 4 January 2026 ‡ National team caps and goals as of 4 July 2024

Mfundo Thikazi (born 23 June 1999) is a South African professional soccer player who plays as a striker or winger for Premier Soccer League club Richards Bay and the South Africa national team.

== Career ==
Thikazi came through the youth academy at Royal Eagles F.C., however had only just broken through to the first team when the club was relegated from the PSL due to breaches in COVID-19 protocols. Thikazi, amongst the rest of the playing squad and coaching staff would face a period of uncertainty around the club as owners Shauwn Mkhize and her husband Sbu Mpisane went through a messy divorce process, leaving Mpisane as the sole owner of the club which saw players not receive payment, or meals at the club as stated in their contract. This culminated in Thikazi's contract being terminated along with several other players.

Following his release, Thikazi signed for Royal AM F.C., a new start-up club founded by former Royal Eagles owner Shauwn Mkhize, having bought the license off former Premier Soccer League foundation club Bloemfontein Celtic, and relocated the license from Bloemfontein, to Durban, in a manner which was seen as highly controversial. Thikazi emerged as one of the clubs most talented young players during the 2022–23 South African Premier Division season, scoring six goals from the wing throughout the season and being used as an impactful player off the bench.

He was called up for South Africa for the 2024 COSAFA Cup, where he made his international debut against Botswana.
