= Ntshangase =

Ntshangase is a South African surname. Notable people with the surname include:

- Luyanda Ntshangase (1997–2018), South African football player
- Phumlani Ntshangase (born 1994), South African football player
- Siphelele Ntshangase (born 1993), South African football player
- Bridget Ntshangase (died 2021), South African politician
