= Moataz Al-Mehdi =

Libyan footballer (born 1990)

Personal information
- Full name: Moataz Al-Mehdi Fadel
- Date of birth: 9 August 1990 (age 36)
- Place of birth: Bayda, Libya
- Height: 1.80 m (5 ft 11 in)
- Position: Forward

Team information
- Current team: Al-Ahli Tripoli

Senior career*
Years	Team	Apps	(Gls)
2009–2010	Al-Najma		
2010–2011	Al-Ahly Benghazi		
2012	Salalah SC		
2012–2016	Al-Ahly Benghazi		
2017–2018	Al-Fahaheel		
2018–2019	Al-Nasr Benghazi		(4)
2020–2022	Al-Ahl Tripoli		
2020–2022	Al-Ahly Benghazi		
2020–2022	Al-Ittihad Club (Tripoli)		

International career^{‡}
2012–	Libya	14	(1)
Medal record
Men's football
Representing Libya
African Nations Championship
Winner	2014 South Africa
- * Club domestic league appearances and goals ‡ National team caps and goals as of 17:04, 22 January 2021 (UTC)

Moataz Al-Mehdi (Arabic: معتز المهدي; born 9 August 1990), is a Libyan footballer who plays for Libyan Premier League side Al-Ahli Tripoli and the Libyan national team as a forward.

== Club career ==
Al-Mehdi scored 7 goals for Al-Nasr Benghazi in its 2018–19 CAF Champions League campaign and finished as the competition's top goalscorer despite his side failing to reach the group stage.

== International career ==
=== International goals ===
Scores and results list Libya's goal tally first.

No.	Date	Venue	Opponent	Score	Result	Competition
1.	21 January 2021	Japoma Stadium, Douala, Cameroon	DR Congo	1–0	1–1	2020 African Nations Championship

== Honours ==
Libya

- African Nations Championship: 2014
