= Jonas Mkude =

Tanzanian footballer

Personal information
- Full name: Jonas Gerard Mkude
- Date of birth: 3 December 1992 (age 33)
- Place of birth: Tanzania
- Position: Midfielder

Team information
- Current team: Young Africans SC
- Number: 20

Senior career*
Years	Team	Apps	(Gls)
2011–2023	Simba SC	28	(1)
2023-2025	Young Africans	4	(0)

International career^{‡}
2012–	Tanzania	34	(0)
- * Club domestic league appearances and goals as of 26/6/25 @ 18:27 ‡ National team caps and goals as of 15:27, 7 January 2021 (UTC)

Jonas Gerard Mkude (born 3 December 1992) is a Tanzanian footballer who plays as a midfielder for Tanzanian club Yanga SC and the Tanzania national team. He made his international debut on 23 February 2012 against the Democratic Republic of the Congo.
