= Gustav Isaak =

Namibian footballer (born 1989)

Personal information
- Date of birth: 8 March 1989 (age 37)
- Place of birth: Berseba, South West Africa
- Position: Midfielder

Team information
- Current team: African Stars

Senior career*
Years	Team	Apps	(Gls)
2009–2010	SK Windhoek		
2014–2015	Orlando Pirates		
2015–2018	United Africa Tigers		
2018–2022	African Stars		

International career
2018–2020	Namibia	3	(0)
- * Club domestic league appearances and goals

Gustav Isaak (born 8 March 1989) is a Namibian former footballer who played as a midfielder for the Namibia national football team.
