= Paseka Mako =

South African soccer player

Personal information
- Full name: Paseka Yaya Mako
- Date of birth: 1 April 1994 (age 32)
- Place of birth: Limpopo, South Africa
- Height: 1.63 m (5 ft 4 in)
- Position: Defender

Team information
- Current team: Kaizer Chiefs
- Number: 29

Youth career
- –2015: Mamelodi Sundowns

Senior career*
Years	Team	Apps	(Gls)
2015–2016	Cape Town All Stars	50	(2)
2016–2018	Chippa United	52	(1)
2018–2025	Orlando Pirates	115	(2)
2025–	Kaizer Chiefs	7	(0)

International career^{‡}
2015	South Africa U23	1	(0)
2018–	South Africa	3	(0)
- * Club domestic league appearances and goals as of 4 January 2026 ‡ National team caps and goals as of 10:05, 3 October 2020 (UTC)

Paseka Matsobane Godfrey Mako (born 1 April 1994) is a South African soccer player who plays as a defender for South African Premiership club Kaizer Chiefs.
