= Ben Motshwari =

South African soccer player

Personal information
- Full name: Ben Motshwari
- Date of birth: 21 March 1991 (age 35)
- Place of birth: Randfontein, South Africa
- Height: 1.74 m (5 ft 9 in)
- Position: Midfielder

Team information
- Current team: AmaZulu
- Number: 8

Senior career*
Years	Team	Apps	(Gls)
2014–2018	Bidvest Wits	66	(5)
2018–2023	Orlando Pirates	97	(5)
2023–	AmaZulu	54	(1)

International career^{‡}
2021	South Africa	2	(0)
- * Club domestic league appearances and goals as of 4 January 2026 ‡ National team caps and goals as of 27 March 2024

Ben Motshwari (born 21 March 1991) is a South African professional soccer player who plays as a midfielder for AmaZulu. He has been capped for the South Africa national team.

== Professional career ==
Motshwari made his professional debut with Bidvest Wits in a 3–0 South African Premier Division win over Moroka Swallows F.C. on 29 August 2014. He signed with Orlando Pirates in 2018.

== International career ==
Motshwari debuted with the South Africa national team in a 1–1 2021 Africa Cup of Nations qualification tie with Ghana on 25 March 2021.
