= Thembinkosi Lorch =

South African soccer player (born 1993)

Personal information
- Full name: Thembinkosi Lorch
- Date of birth: 22 July 1993 (age 33)
- Place of birth: Ficksburg, Free State, South Africa
- Height: 1.68 m (5 ft 6 in)
- Position: Attacking midfielder

Team information
- Current team: Al Ittihad Tripoli
- Number: 11

Senior career*
| Years | Team | Apps | (Gls) |
| 2013–2015 | Maluti FET College | 100 | (9) |
| 2015–2024 | Orlando Pirates | 120 | (18) |
| 2015–2016 | → Cape Town All Stars (loan) | 23 | (5) |
| 2016–2017 | → Chippa United (loan) | 13 | (3) |
| 2023–2025 | Mamelodi Sundowns | 26 | (7) |
| 2025 | → Wydad (loan) | 18 | (5) |
| 2025–2026 | Wydad | 11 | (6) |
| 2026- | Al Ittihad Tripoli | 5 | (1) |

International career^{‡}
| 2016–2022 | South Africa | 9 | (1) |
- * Club domestic league appearances and goals as of 2 March 2026 ‡ National team caps and goals as of 27 March 2024

Thembinkosi Christopher Lorch (born 22 July 1993) is a South African professional soccer player who plays as an attacking midfielder for Al Ittihad Tripoli and the South African national team.

He was named the "South African Player of the Season and Players' Player" of the Season in 2019. He is regarded as one of the best players of his generation in the South African topflight division.

== Career ==
Thembinkosi Lorch nicknamed "Nyoso" started his career at Katlehong Young Stars based at QwaQwa before joining Maluti FET College. And after a game against Jomo Cosmos, got a call from Screamer Tshabalala who told him that Orlando Pirates were interested in him. His first PSL game was against Free State Stars. He later played for NFD outfit Cape Town All Stars on loan from Orlando Pirates in the 2015–16 season. He was also loaned out to Chippa United in the 2016–17. In January 2024, he signed for Mamelodi Sundowns, before joining Moroccan side Wydad AC on loan in February 2025. In August 2025,Lorch was announced officially as Wydad AC player after his impressive performance at the FIFA Club World Cup where he even scored a goal.

== Personal life ==
DJ Maphorisa and Kabza De Small's 2019 song, titled Lorch, was inspired by and named after him, following a stellar season he enjoyed with Orlando Pirates

In the early morning of 7 September 2020, Lorch was arrested for allegedly assaulting his then-girlfriend, Nokuphiwa Mathithibala. This came after she had opened a case of assault against him at Midrand Police station indicating that Lorch had strangled her after she had asked about his whereabouts. In January 2021, the assault case was provisionally withdrawn with the prosecutor instructing police to investigate further.

Lorch briefly dated actress Natasha Thahane from June to September 2021, with whom he allegedly shares a son.

== Career statistics ==
As of matches played on 9 June 2022

Appearances and goals by national team and year
| National team | Year | Apps | Goals |
|---|---|---|---|
| South Africa | 2016 | 2 | 0 |
| South Africa | 2017 | 0 | 0 |
| South Africa | 2018 | 1 | 0 |
| South Africa | 2019 | 5 | 1 |
| South Africa | 2022 | 1 | 0 |
| Total | | 9 | 1 |

Scores and results list South Africa's goal tally first, score column indicates score after each Lorch goal.

List of international goals scored by Thembinkosi Lorch
| No. | Date | Venue | Opponent | Score | Result | Competition |
|---|---|---|---|---|---|---|
| 1 | 6 July 2019 | Cairo International Stadium, Cairo, Egypt | Egypt | 1–0 | 1–0 | 2019 Africa Cup of Nations |

== Honours ==
Orlando Pirates

- Nedbank Cup: 2022–23
- MTN 8: 2020, 2022, 2023
- CAF Confederation Cup runner-up: 2021–22

Mamelodi Sundowns

- South African Premiership: 2023–24

Individual

- PSL Footballer of the Year: 2018–19
- PSL Player of the Season: 2018–19
- PSL Players' Player of the Season: 2018–19
