= Terrence Dzvukamanja =

Zimbabwean footballer (born 1994)

Personal information
- Full name: Terrence Mudauzi Dzvukamanja
- Date of birth: 5 May 1994 (age 32)
- Place of birth: Chegutu, Zimbabwe
- Height: 1.78 m (5 ft 10 in)
- Position: Attacking midfielder

Team information
- Current team: Scottland

Senior career*
Years	Team	Apps	(Gls)
2016–2018	Ngezi Platinum		
2018–2020	Bidvest Wits	44	(7)
2020–2023	Orlando Pirates	54	(8)
2023–2025	SuperSport United	44	(6)
2025–2026	Scottland		
2026–	Hunters		

International career^{‡}
2017–	Zimbabwe	22	(1)
- * Club domestic league appearances and goals as of 1 August 2024 ‡ National team caps and goals as of 19 November 2024

Terrence Dzvukamanja (born 5 May 1994) is a Zimbabwean professional footballer who plays as an attacking midfielder for Zimbabwe Premier Soccer League club Hunters and the Zimbabwe national team.

Dzvukamanja played several seasons for Orlando Pirates. After scoring the winning goal in the 2022–23 Nedbank Cup, he was surprisingly signed by SuperSport United.
