= Nkanyiso Zungu =

South African soccer player

Personal information
- Date of birth: 23 January 1996 (age 30)
- Height: 1.82 m (6 ft 0 in)
- Position: Midfielder

Team information
- Current team: Pretoria Callies

Youth career
- Kwamashu Arsenal

Senior career*
Years	Team	Apps	(Gls)
2015–2018	Amazulu	47	(2)
2018	→ Jomo Cosmos (loan)	13	(1)
2018–2020	Stellenbosch	46	(0)
2020–2023	Orlando Pirates	17	(0)
2022	→ Moroka Swallows (loan)	0	(0)
2022–2023	→ Richards Bay (loan)	11	(0)
2024	Platinum City Rovers	5	(0)
2024–	Pretoria Callies	7	(0)
- * Club domestic league appearances and goals as of 18 November 2024

Nkanyiso Zungu (born 23 January 1996) is a South African professional soccer player who plays as a forward for Pretoria Callies.

In 2022 he was embroiled in a police investigation and suspended from soccer. In 2022–23 he was loaned out to Richards Bay, but the club chose to terminate his loan following disciplinary issues. He was released in 2023, and subsequently trained with Royal AM—who could not sign him due to a transfer ban—and AmaZulu. He was only able to find a new club in the second tier, joining Platinum City Rovers in March 2024. After their relegation he went on to Pretoria Callies.
