= Innocent Maela =

South African soccer player

Personal information
- Full name: Sakhile Innocent Maela
- Date of birth: 14 August 1992 (age 34)
- Place of birth: Witbank, South Africa
- Height: 1.76 m (5 ft 9 1/2 in)
- Position: Defender

Team information
- Current team: Orlando Pirates
- Number: 23

Youth career
- 2008-2012: Orlando Pirates

Senior career*
Years	Team	Apps	(Gls)
2012–2014	Witbank Spurs	35	(4)
2014–2017	Thanda Royal Zulu	82	(5)
2017–2025	Orlando Pirates	144	(5)

International career^{‡}
2017–2024	South Africa	11	(0)
- * Club domestic league appearances and goals as of 30 June 2024 ‡ National team caps and goals as of 20:00, 28 March 2023 (UTC)

Innocent Maela (born 14 August 1992) is a retired South African professional football player who played as a defender for Orlando Pirates, which he captained, and the South Africa national team.

== Personal ==
He is the son of footballer Eric Maela and he is also paternal half-brother of Tsepo Masilela. He married Zenande Funani on 21 March 2025 in Maclear, Eastern Cape.
