= Ntsikelelo Nyauza =

South African soccer player

Personal information
- Date of birth: 10 May 1990 (age 36)
- Place of birth: Matatiele, South Africa
- Height: 1.76 m (5 ft 9 in)
- Position: Defender

Team information
- Current team: Moroka Swallows
- Number: 50

Senior career*
Years	Team	Apps	(Gls)
2010–2013	Platinum Stars	28	(0)
2013–2014	Roses United	1	(0)
2014–2022	Orlando Pirates	154	(4)
2022–2023	Richards Bay	22	(1)
2024–	Moroka Swallows	2	(0)
- * Club domestic league appearances and goals as of 20 March 2024

Ntsikelelo Nyauza (born 10 May 1990) is a South African professional soccer player who plays for Moroka Swallows as a defender.

== Career ==
Nyauza has played for Platinum Stars, Roses United and Orlando Pirates. He spent 2022–23 with Richards Bay.

In February 2024, he was a part of a sizeable influx at Moroka Swallows after the club sacked large parts of its previous team.

== Career statistics ==
As of 30 January 2018

Appearances and goals by club, season and competition
Club	Season	League			Cup		League Cup		Other		Total	
Club	Season	Division	Apps	Goals	Apps	Goals	Apps	Goals	Apps	Goals	Apps	Goals
Platinum Stars	2010–11	Premier Soccer League	9	0	0	0	0	0	0	0	9	0
Platinum Stars	2011–12	Premier Soccer League	15	0	0	0	0	0	0	0	15	0
Platinum Stars	2012–13	Premier Soccer League	4	0	0	0	1	0	0	0	5	0
Platinum Stars	Total		28	0	0	0	1	0	0	0	29	0
Roses United	2013–14	National First Division	1	0	0	0	0	0	0	0	1	0
Orlando Pirates	2013–14	Premier Soccer League	8	0	3	0	0	0	0	0	11	0
Orlando Pirates	2014–15	Premier Soccer League	18	0	0	0	1	0	2 (Note: Appearances in MTN 8)	0	21	0
Orlando Pirates	2015–16	Premier Soccer League	20	0	5	0	1	0	1	0	27	0
Orlando Pirates	2016–17	Premier Soccer League	12	0	0	0	1	0	0	0	13	0
Orlando Pirates	2017–18	Premier Soccer League	17	2	0	0	2	1	0	0	19	3
Orlando Pirates	Total		75	2	8	0	5	1	3	0	91	3
Career totals			103	2	8	0	6	1	3	0	120	3
