= Wayne Sandilands =

South African soccer player (born 1983)

Personal information
- Full name: Wayne Sandilands
- Date of birth: 23 August 1983 (age 43)
- Place of birth: Benoni, South Africa
- Height: 1.80 m (5 ft 11 in)
- Position: Goalkeeper

Youth career
- Benoni Northerns
- Supersport United

Senior career*
| Years | Team | Apps | (Gls) |
| 2004–2005 | Supersport United | 0 | (0) |
| 2005–2009 | Platinum Stars | 62 | (0) |
| 2009–2017 | Mamelodi Sundowns | 94 | (0) |
| 2017–2022 | Orlando Pirates | 91 | (0) |

International career^{‡}
| 2011–2013 | South Africa | 9 | (0) |
- * Club domestic league appearances and goals as of 13:32, 24 April 2021 (UTC) ‡ National team caps and goals as of 25 December 2013

Wayne Sandilands (born 23 August 1983 in Benoni, Gauteng) is a former South African professional soccer player who last played as a goalkeeper for Orlando Pirates in the Dstv Premier Soccer League.

== Honours ==
Supersport United

• MTN 8

Winners : 2004

• Nedbank Cup

Winners : 2005

Platinum Stars

• Premier Soccer League

Runners up :2006/2007

• Telkom Knockout

Winners: 2006

Mamelodi Sundowns:

- Premier Soccer League : 2013/14, 2015/16
- Nedbank Cup : 2014/15
- Telkom Knockout : 2015
- CAF Champions League : 2016
- CAF Super Cup : 2017

Orlando pirates

• Premier Soccer League

Runners up : 2017/2018, 2018/2019

• Telkom knockout

Runners up : 2018

• MTN 8

Winners : 2020
