= Collins Makgaka =

South African soccer player

Personal information
- Date of birth: 28 June 1996 (age 30)
- Place of birth: Marble Hall, South Africa
- Position: Midfielder

Team information
- Current team: Baroka

Senior career*
Years	Team	Apps	(Gls)
2015–2020	Baroka	60	(3)
2020–2023	Orlando Pirates	17	(2)
2023–2024	Sekhukhune United	0	(0)
2024–	Baroka	4	(0)
- * Club domestic league appearances and goals as of 12 October 2024

Collins Makgaka (born 28 June 1996) is a South African soccer player who plays as a midfielder for National First Division side Baroka.

== Career ==
Magkaka was born in Marble Hall.

After 5 years at Baroka, he left the club in the summer of 2020 after his contract was not renewed.

He joined Orlando Pirates on a three-year deal in September 2020. He was released in July 2023, and trained with Stellenbosch without being able to get a contract offer from them. New trials with Polokwane City and Sekhukhune United followed.
