= Siyabonga Mpontshane =

South African footballer (born 1986)

Personal information
- Date of birth: 17 April 1986 (age 40)
- Place of birth: Ndumo, Ingwavuma, South Africa
- Position: Goalkeeper

Team information
- Current team: Orlando Pirates
- Number: 40

Senior career*
Years	Team	Apps	(Gls)
2005–2010	Nathi Lions		
2010–2015	Platinum Stars	76	(0)
2015–	Orlando Pirates	89	(0)
- * Club domestic league appearances and goals as of 3 April 2016

Siyabonga Mpontshane (born 17 April 1986) is a South African former professional soccer player who played as a goalkeeper for Orlando Pirates.

== Playing career ==
Mpontshane was signed from the National First Division side Nathi Lions in 2010 and made his debut in a 3–2 win over Mpumalanga Black Aces on 29 August 2010.
