= Siphelele Luthuli =

South African soccer player

Personal information
- Date of birth: 1 February 1995 (age 31)
- Place of birth: Cato Manor, South Africa
- Position: Midfielder

Team information
- Current team: Chippa United
- Number: 36

Senior career*
Years	Team	Apps	(Gls)
2015–2017	University of Pretoria	7	(0)
2017–2018	Highlands Park	21	(0)
2018–2019	Ubuntu Cape Town	21	(1)
2019–	Bloemfontein Celtic	42	(6)
2021–2022	Royal AM	1	(0)
2022–	Chippa United	21	(2)
- * Club domestic league appearances and goals as of 30 October 2022

Siphelele Luthuli (born 1 February 1995) is a South African professional soccer player who plays as a midfielder for South African Premier Division side Chippa United.

== Club career ==
Luthuli is from Cato Manor, Durban. Having first joined their academy in 2009, He made his debut in the South African Premier Division with University of Pretoria in 2015, but they were relegated to the National First Division shortly after. In August 2017, he signed a one-year deal with Highlands Park, before signing for Ubuntu Cape Town in July 2018. After a trial spell with South African Premier Division side Bloemfontein Celtic, he signed for the club in summer 2019.

== International career ==
In November 2013, Luthuli received a call-up to the South Africa national under-20 team.
