= Vincent Pule =

South African soccer player

Personal information
- Full name: Maliele Vincent Pule
- Date of birth: 10 March 1992 (age 34)
- Place of birth: Bloemfontein, South Africa
- Height: 1.76 m (5 ft 9 in)
- Position: Forward

Team information
- Current team: Siwelele FC
- Number: 10

Youth career
- Lekoeneha Mighty Spurs

Senior career*
Years	Team	Apps	(Gls)
2012–2014	African Warriors	43	(9)
2014–2018	Bidvest Wits	39	(7)
2018–2024	Orlando Pirates	106	(18)
2024–2025	SuperSport United	2	(2)
2025	Siwelele FC	1	(1)

International career
2018–2021	South Africa	3	(0)
- * Club domestic league appearances and goals as of 30 September 2024

Maliele Vincent Pule (born 10 March 1992) is a South African soccer player who plays for Siwelele FC. He has been capped for South Africa.

He left Orlando Pirates at the end of the 2023-24 season after 146 appearances, 14 assists and 24 goals in all competitions.

He joined Siwelele FC before the start of the 2024-25 season. He currently plays for the newly purchased Siwelele FC which also competes in the betway premiership
