= Fortune Makaringe =

South African soccer player

Personal information
- Date of birth: 13 May 1993 (age 33)
- Place of birth: Johannesburg, South Africa
- Height: 1.81 m (5 ft 11 1/2 in)
- Position: Midfielder

Team information
- Current team: Cape Town City
- Number: 93

Youth career
- Moroka Swallows

Senior career*
Years	Team	Apps	(Gls)
2015–2019	Maritzburg United	73	(5)
2019–2023	Orlando Pirates	105	(6)
2024–	Cape Town City	4	(0)

International career^{‡}
2018	South Africa	3	(0)
- * Club domestic league appearances and goals as of 17 November 2024 ‡ National team caps and goals as of 17 November 2024

Fortune Makaringe (born 13 May 1993) is a South African professional soccer player who plays as a midfielder for South African Premier Division side Cape Town City. He also plays for the South Africa national football team. He previously played for Maritzburg United.

== Club career ==
Born in Johannesburg, Makaringe started his career at Moroka Swallows before joining Maritzburg United. Makaringe signed for Orlando Pirates in the summer of 2019. Makaringe shortly left the Club after 5 years at the Buccaneers.

== International career ==
Makaringe made his debut for South Africa on 3 June 2018 in a 0–0 draw against Madagascar, though South Africa went on to lose 4–3 on penalties. He was part of South Africa's preliminary 28-man squad for the 2019 Africa Cup of Nations but as not part of their final 23-man squad.
