= Abel Mabaso =

South African soccer player

Personal information
- Full name: Abel Ntuthuko Mabaso
- Date of birth: 15 May 1991 (age 35)
- Place of birth: Durban, South Africa
- Height: 1.73 m (5 ft 8 in)
- Position: Defender

Team information
- Current team: Richards Bay
- Number: 6

Youth career
- Durban Metro Academy
- Westville United Football Academy
- M Tigers
- Mamelodi Sundowns

Senior career*
Years	Team	Apps	(Gls)
2012–2017	Mamelodi Sundowns	17	(1)
2013–2014	→ Mpumalanga Black Aces (loan)	26	(0)
2014–2015	→ Maritzburg United (loan)	28	(1)
2015–2016	→ Ajax Cape Town (loan)	19	(0)
2016–2017	→ Ajax Cape Town (loan)	7	(0)
2017–2018	Chippa United	28	(4)
2018–2022	Orlando Pirates	45	(1)
2022–	Richards Bay	24	(1)
- * Club domestic league appearances and goals as of 4 May 2023

Abel Ntuthuko Mabaso (born 15 May 1991) is a South African soccer player who plays as a defender for Premier Soccer League club Richards Bay.
