= Linda Mntambo =

South African soccer player

Personal information
- Full name: Onassis Linda Mntambo
- Date of birth: 3 June 1989 (age 37)
- Place of birth: Johannesburg, South Africa
- Height: 1.80 m (5 ft 11 in)
- Positions: Midfielder; winger

Team information
- Current team: Sekhukhune United
- Number: 32

Senior career*
Years	Team	Apps	(Gls)
2013–2014	Roses United	18	(0)
2013–2018	Jomo Cosmos	90	(12)
2018	Chippa United	12	(3)
2018–2022	Orlando Pirates	71	(8)
2022–	Sekhukhune United	52	(11)

International career^{‡}
2017	South Africa	1	(0)
- * Club domestic league appearances and goals as of 4 January 2026 ‡ National team caps and goals as of 23 June 2022

Onassis Linda Mntambo (born 3 June 1989) is a South African professional soccer player who plays as a midfielder for Sekhukhune United. He has been capped once for the South African national team. In 2023 he modelled on the Soweto Fashion Week runway for fashion brand N.O.T.E.
