= 2020–21 ES Sétif season =

ES Sétif
2020–21 season
- President: Kamel Lafi (from 15 November 2020)
- Head coach: Nabil Kouki
- Stadium: Stade 8 Mai 1945
- Ligue 1: Runners-up
- League Cup: Round of 16
- Confederation Cup: Group stage
- Top goalscorer: League: Mohamed El Amine Amoura (15 goals); All: Mohamed El Amine Amoura (17 goals)
- Highest home attendance: 0 (Note: no one can attend games due to the COVID-19 pandemic)
- Lowest home attendance: 0 (Note: no one can attend games due to the COVID-19 pandemic)
- Average home league attendance: 0 (Note: no one can attend games due to the COVID-19 pandemic)
Home colours	Away colours	Third colours

In the 2020–21 season, ES Sétif is competing in the Ligue 1 for the 51st season, as well as the Algerian Cup. It is their 25th consecutive season in the top flight of Algerian football. They will be competing in Ligue 1 and the Confederation Cup.

== Squad list ==
Players and squad numbers last updated on 15 November 2020.
Note: Flags indicate national team as has been defined under FIFA eligibility rules. Players may hold more than one non-FIFA nationality.

No.	Nat.	Position	Name	Date of birth (age)	Signed from
Goalkeepers
1	(Algeria)	GK	Sofiane Khedairia	1 April 1989 (aged 31)	(Algeria) USM Bel Abbès
16	(Algeria)	GK	Said Daas	15 May 1999 (aged 21)	(Algeria) Youth system
23	(Algeria)	GK	Khairi Barki	12 December 1990 (aged 30)	(Algeria) CR Belouizdad
Defenders
4	(Algeria)	CB	Amine Biaz	22 March 1999 (aged 21)	(Algeria) Youth system
5	(Algeria)	CB	Halim Meddour	11 February 1997 (aged 23)	(Luxembourg) Jeunesse Esch
8	(Algeria)	LB	Houari Ferhani	11 February 1993 (aged 27)	(Algeria) JS Kabylie
13	(Algeria)	RB	Abdelkrim Nemdil	3 October 1989 (aged 31)	(Algeria) USM El Harrach
18	(Algeria)	CB	Hocine Laribi	17 November 1991 (aged 29)	(Algeria) NA Hussein Dey
20	(Algeria)	RB	Abdelhak Debbari	6 January 1993 (aged 27)	(Algeria) MO Béjaïa
21	(Algeria)	RB	Amir Laidouni	20 September 1999 (aged 21)	(Algeria) JSM Skikda
22	(Algeria)	CB	Ibrahim Bekakchi	10 January 1992 (aged 28)	(Algeria) JS Saoura
44	(Algeria)	CB	Ibrahim Hachoud	5 March 2000 (aged 20)	(Algeria) Youth system
Midfielders
3	(Algeria)	DM	Messala Merbah	22 July 1994 (aged 26)	(Tunisia) CS Chebba
6	(Algeria)	DM	Ahmed Kendouci	22 June 1999 (aged 21)	(Algeria) Youth system
7	(Algeria)	AM	Akram Djahnit	3 April 1991 (aged 29)	(Kuwait) Al-Arabi
12	(Algeria)	AM	Bassem Nedjmeddine Charama	21 March 1998 (aged 22)	(Algeria) Youth system
14	(Algeria)	DM	Amir Karaoui	3 August 1987 (aged 33)	(Algeria) MC Alger
15	(Algeria)	AM	Abderrahim Deghmoum	2 December 1998 (aged 22)	(Algeria) Youth system
19	(Algeria)		Youcef Dali	26 February 1999 (aged 21)	(Algeria) Youth system
25	(Algeria)		Mohamed Djahli	10 November 1998 (aged 22)	(Algeria) Youth system
Forwards
9	(Algeria)	ST	Habib Bouguelmouna	12 December 1988 (aged 32)	(Algeria) USM Bel Abbès
11	(Algeria)	LW	Youcef Laouafi	1 March 1996 (aged 24)	(Algeria) MC El Eulma
10	(Mali)	LW	Malick Touré	22 September 1995 (aged 25)	(Algeria) MO Béjaïa
17	(Algeria)		Khier-Anes Belaid	24 June 1999 (aged 21)	(Algeria) Youth system
24	(Algeria)	ST	Yasser Berbache	8 February 1996 (aged 24)	(Algeria) MC El Eulma
26	(Algeria)	LW	Ismaïl Saïdi	4 April 1997 (aged 23)	(Algeria) WA Tlemcen
27	(Algeria)	RW	Houssam Ghacha	22 October 1995 (aged 25)	(Algeria) USM Blida
42	(Algeria)		Youcef Fellahi	11 April 2002 (aged 18)	(Algeria) Youth system
47	(Algeria)	LW	Mohamed El Amine Amoura	9 May 2000 (aged 20)	(Algeria) Youth system
72	(Algeria)		Khalil Darfalou	21 June 2001 (aged 19)	(Algeria) Youth system
88	(Algeria)		Monsef Bakrar	13 January 2001 (aged 19)	(Algeria) Youth system

== Competitions ==
=== Overview ===
Competition	Record								Started round	Final position / round	First match	Last match
Competition	G	W	D	L	GF	GA	GD	Win %	Started round	Final position / round	First match	Last match
Ligue 1	38	21	9	8	69	32	+37	55.26	—N/a	Runners-up	28 November 2020	24 August 2021
League Cup	1	0	0	1	1	2	−1	0.00	Round of 16		8 May 2021	
Confederation Cup	8	3	3	2	7	4	+3	37.50	Preliminary round	Group stage	14 February 2021	28 April 2021
Total	47	24	12	11	77	38	+39	51.06				

Updated to match played 24 August 2021
Source: Competitions

== League table ==
Pos	Team	Pld	W	D	L	GF	GA	GD	Pts	Qualification or relegation
1	CR Belouizdad (C)	38	22	13	3	69	27	+42	79	Qualification for Champions League
2	ES Sétif	38	21	9	8	69	32	+37	71 (Note: On May 16, 2021 after not respecting Covid-19 tests regulation before RC Relizane match, ES Sétif Lost the match 2–0.)	Qualification for Champions League
3	JS Saoura	38	20	9	9	60	30	+30	69 (Note: On March 13, 2021 after the participation of a penalized player Oussama Meddahi against Paradou AC, JS Saoura Lost the match 3–0.)	Qualification for Confederation Cup
4	USM Alger	38	19	8	11	62	39	+23	65	
5	JS Kabylie	38	17	10	11	44	33	+11	61	Qualification for Confederation Cup

Updated to match(es) played on 28 August 2021. Source: dzfoot.com
Rules for classification: 1) points; 2) head-to-head points; 3) head-to-head goal difference; 4) goal difference; 5) total goals; 6) fairplay ranking; 7) playoff.
(C) Champions

=== Results summary ===
Overall								Home						Away					
Pld	W	D	L	GF	GA	GD	Pts	W	D	L	GF	GA	GD	W	D	L	GF	GA	GD
37	21	8	8	73	34	+39	71	13	5	1	45	11	+34	8	3	7	28	23	+5

Last updated: 24 August 2021.
Source: Competitive matches

=== Results by round ===
Round	1	2	3	4	5	6	7	8	9	10	11	12	13	14	15	16	17	18	19	20	21	22	23	24	25	26	27	28	29	30	31	32	33	34	35	36	37	38
Ground	A	H	A	H	A	H	A	H	A	H	A	H	A	H	H	A	H	A	H	H	A	H	A	H	A	H	A	H	A	H	A	H	A	A	H	A	H	A
Result	W	D	W	W	W	W	W	L	W	D	D	W	L	W	W	L	W	W	W	D	D	W	D	W	W	W	L	W	L	D	L	D	L	D	W	W	W	L
Position	1	1	1	1	1	1	1	1	1	1	1	1	1	1	1	1	1	1	1	1	1	1	1	1	1	1	1	1	1	1	2	2	2	2	2	2	2	2

Updated to match(es) played on 24 August 2021. Source: Competitive matches
A = Away; H = Home; W = Win; D = Draw; L = Loss

=== Matches ===
On 22 October 2020, the Algerian Ligue Professionnelle 1 fixtures were announced.

28 November 2020 Round 1	USM Alger	0–2	ES Sétif	Bologhine
16:00		Soccerway report	Amoura 87', 90+2'	Stadium: Omar Hamadi Stadium; Attendance: 0 (close doors); Referee: Lahlou Benbraham

5 December 2020 Round 2	ES Sétif	1–1	RC Relizane	Sétif
15:00	Saadi 54'	Soccerway report	Hitala 44' (pen.)	Stadium: Stade 8 Mai 1945; Attendance: 0 (close doors); Referee: Amine Hansal

12 December 2020 Round 3	USM Bel Abbès	0–2	ES Sétif	Sidi Bel Abbès
14:00		Soccerway report	Ghacha 14'; Laouafi 62'	Stadium: Stade 24 Fevrier 1956; Attendance: 0 (close doors); Referee: Amine Sekhraoui

17 December 2020 Round 4	ES Sétif	2–0	NC Magra	Sétif
15:00	Laouafi 24'; Saïdi 36'	Soccerway report		Stadium: Stade 8 Mai 1945; Attendance: 0 (close doors); Referee: Mustapha Bessiri

27 December 2020 Round 6	ES Sétif	1–0	Paradou AC	Sétif
15:00	Amoura 81'	Soccerway report		Stadium: Stade 8 Mai 1945; Attendance: 0 (close doors); Referee: Mohamed Boutaraa

1 January 2021 Round 5	NA Hussein Dey	0–1	ES Sétif	Belouizdad
14:30		Soccerway report	Amoura 66'	Stadium: Stade 20 Août 1955; Attendance: 0 (close doors); Referee: Ahmed Bouzrar

9 January 2021 Round 7	CA Bordj Bou Arreridj	1–5	ES Sétif	Bordj Bou Arréridj
14:30	Rahba 52'	Soccerway report	Laouafi 16' (pen.); Ghacha 40', 48' (pen.); Amoura 45'; Touré 84'	Stadium: Stade 20 Août 1955; Attendance: 0 (close doors); Referee: Lotfi Bekouassa

16 January 2021 Round 8	ES Sétif	0–1	MC Alger	Sétif
14:30		Soccerway report	Lamara 75'	Stadium: Stade 8 Mai 1945; Attendance: 0 (close doors); Referee: Mustapha Ghorbal

22 January 2021 Round 9	CS Constantine	0–1	ES Sétif	El Khroub
14:30		Soccerway report	Kendouci 17'	Stadium: Stade Abed Hamdani; Attendance: 0 (close doors); Referee: Nabil Boukhalfa

26 January 2021 Round 10	ES Sétif	0–0	Olympique de Médéa	Sétif
15:00		Soccerway report		Stadium: Stade 8 Mai 1945; Attendance: 0 (close doors); Referee: Redouane Necib

30 January 2021 Round 11	CR Belouizdad	1–1	ES Sétif	Belouizdad
14:30	Sayoud 77' (pen.)	Soccerway report	Debbari 35'	Stadium: Stade 20 Août 1955; Attendance: 0 (close doors); Referee: Mohamed Saïdi

6 February 2021 Round 12	ES Sétif	4–1	MC Oran	Sétif
14:30	Touré 27'; Ferhani 42'; Kendouci 76'; Bakrar 78'	Soccerway report	Belkaroui 30'	Stadium: Stade 8 Mai 1945; Attendance: 0 (close doors); Referee: Lyés Bekouassa

27 February 2021 Round 15	ES Sétif	3–0	ASO Chlef	Sétif
15:00	Kendouci 17', 60'; Amoura 66'	Soccerway report		Stadium: Stade 8 Mai 1945; Attendance: 0 (close doors); Referee: Lahlou Benbraham

5 March 2021 Round 16	US Biskra	1–0	ES Sétif	Biskra
15:00	Harrari 86'	Soccerway report		Stadium: Stade du 18 Février; Attendance: 0 (close doors); Referee: Farouk Mial

21 March 2021 Round 19	ES Sétif	4–1	WA Tlemcen	Sétif
15:00	Bakrar 17'; Deghmoum 30'; Amoura 35'; Kendouci 77'	Soccerway report	Zermane 48' (pen.)	Stadium: Stade 8 Mai 1945; Attendance: 0 (close doors); Referee: Hamza Bouslimani

26 March 2021 Round 13	JS Saoura	1–0	ES Sétif	Béchar
15:00	Messaoudi 54'	Soccerway report		Stadium: Stade 20 Août 1955; Attendance: 0 (close doors); Referee: Ahmed Bouzrar

30 March 2021 Round 14	ES Sétif	4–0	AS Ain M'lila	Sétif
15:00	Djahnit 5' (pen.); Amoura 17', 45+3'; Berbache 74'	Soccerway report		Stadium: Stade 8 Mai 1945; Attendance: 0 (close doors); Referee: Lotfi Bekouassa

15 April 2021 Round 17	ES Sétif	1–0	JS Kabylie	Sétif
22:30	Bekakchi 60'	Soccerway report		Stadium: Stade 8 Mai 1945; Attendance: 0 (close doors); Referee: Abderrezzak Arab

1 May 2021 Round 18	JSM Skikda	0–1	ES Sétif	Skikda
16:00		Soccerway report	Berbache 19'	Stadium: Stade 20 Août 1955; Attendance: 0 (close doors); Referee: Lahlou Benbraham

4 May 2021 Round 20	ES Sétif	1–1	USM Alger	Sétif
22:30	Ghacha 80' (pen.)	Soccerway report	Benhammouda 55'	Stadium: Stade 8 Mai 1945; Attendance: 0 (close doors); Referee: Nabil Boukhalfa

16 May 2021 Round 21	RC Relizane	2–2	ES Sétif	Relizane
16:00	Feham 52' (pen.); Elmenaouer 58'	Soccerway report	Ghacha 7' (pen.), 63'	Stadium: Stade Tahar Zoughari; Attendance: 0 (close doors); Referee: Malek Ait Ameur

22 May 2021 Round 22	ES Sétif	8–0	USM Bel Abbès	Sétif
17:00	Djahnit 11' (pen.); Amoura 21', 33'; Kendouci 23'; Laouafi 63'; Berbache 82'; Ghacha 90+1'; Saâdi 90+4'	Soccerway report		Stadium: Stade 8 Mai 1945; Attendance: 0 (close doors); Referee: Abdelkader Belhabib

26 May 2021 Round 23	NC Magra	2–2	ES Sétif	Magra
17:00	Fegas 74', 90' (pen.)	Soccerway report	Deghmoum 51'; Berbache 85'	Stadium: Boucheligue Brothers Stadium; Attendance: 0 (close doors); Referee: Farouk Mial

30 May 2021 Round 24	ES Sétif	3–2	NA Hussein Dey	Sétif
17:00	Kendouci 8'; Amoura 42'; Debbari 86'	Soccerway report	Chouiter 78', 90+3'	Stadium: Stade 8 Mai 1945; Attendance: 0 (close doors); Referee: Walid Lahrache

10 June 2021 Round 25	Paradou AC	0–3	ES Sétif	Dar El Beïda
17:00		Soccerway report	Deghmoum 14'; Ghacha 40'; Amoura 58' (pen.)	Stadium: Omar Benrabah Stadium; Attendance: 0 (close doors); Referee: Lahlou Benbraham

20 June 2021 Round 26	ES Sétif	2–0	CA Bordj Bou Arreridj	Sétif
17:45	Ghacha 45' (pen.); Djahnit 80' (pen.)	Soccerway report		Stadium: Stade 8 Mai 1945; Attendance: 0 (close doors); Referee: Lotfi Bekouassa

28 June 2021 Round 27	MC Alger	3–2	ES Sétif	Algiers
17:45	Lamara 38'; Hachoud 68'; Esso 87'	Soccerway report	Amoura 17', 27'	Stadium: Stade du 5 Juillet; Attendance: 0 (close doors); Referee: Nabil Boukhalfa

1 July 2021 Round 28	ES Sétif	1–0	CS Constantine	Sétif
17:45	Kendouci 58'	Soccerway report		Stadium: Stade 8 Mai 1945; Attendance: 0 (close doors); Referee: Said Aouina

4 July 2021 Round 29	Olympique de Médéa	3–1	ES Sétif	Médéa
17:10	Dadache 4', 31'; Baâli 5'	Soccerway report	Ghacha 90'	Stadium: Stade Imam Lyes; Attendance: 0 (close doors); Referee: Houssam Benyahia

8 July 2021 Round 30	ES Sétif	0–0	CR Belouizdad	Sétif
21:00		Soccerway report		Stadium: Stade 8 Mai 1945; Attendance: 0 (close doors); Referee: Mehdi Abid Charef

13 July 2021 Round 31	MC Oran	4–0	ES Sétif	Oran
21:00	Motrani 19', 69'; Benhamou 43'; Khettab 90'	Soccerway report		Stadium: Ahmed Zabana Stadium; Attendance: 0 (close doors); Referee: Lyés Bekouassa

17 July 2021 Round 32	ES Sétif	2–2	JS Saoura	Sétif
21:00	Djabou 50'; Kendouci 90+6'	Soccerway report	Saâd 45'; Amrane 69'	Stadium: Stade 8 Mai 1945; Attendance: 0 (close doors); Referee: Hamza Bouslimani

23 July 2021 Round 33	AS Ain M'lila	2–1	ES Sétif	Aïn M'lila
21:00	Djabout 9'; Debbih 75'	Soccerway report	Laribi 35'	Stadium: Touhami Zoubir Khelifi Stadium; Attendance: 0 (close doors); Referee: Abderrezzak Arab

27 July 2021 Round 34	ASO Chlef	1–1	ES Sétif	Chlef
21:00	Ouis 6'	Soccerway report	Merbah 53'	Stadium: Stade Mohamed Boumezrag; Attendance: 0 (close doors); Referee: Ali Nader

9 August 2021 Round 35	ES Sétif	4–0	US Biskra	Sétif
21:00	Djahnit 11' (pen.); Djabou 32', 69'; Lomotey 90'	Soccerway report		Stadium: Stade 8 Mai 1945; Attendance: 0 (close doors); Referee: Redouane Necib

18 August 2021 Round 36	JS Kabylie	1–3	ES Sétif	Tizi Ouzou
21:00	Nezla 66'	Soccerway report	Kendouci 49'; Djabou 57'; Bakrar 82'	Stadium: Stade 1er Novembre 1954; Attendance: 0 (close doors); Referee: Youcef Taieb Bouderbal

21 August 2021 Round 37	ES Sétif	2–0	JSM Skikda	Sétif
21:00	Djahnit 45+1'; Lomotey 58'	Soccerway report		Stadium: Stade 8 Mai 1945; Attendance: 0 (close doors); Referee: Elhadj Chihaoui

24 August 2021 Round 38	WA Tlemcen	1–0	ES Sétif	Tlemcen
17:30	Touil 66'	Soccerway report		Stadium: Stade Akid Lotfi; Attendance: 0 (close doors); Referee: Lyés Bekouassa

== Algerian League Cup ==
8 May 2021 Round of 16	ES Setif	1–2	WA Tlemcen	Sétif
22:30	Ghacha 6'		Zermane 32'; Lakehal 73'	Stadium: Stade 8 Mai 1945; Attendance: 0 (close doors); Referee: Hamza Bouslimani
Note: Lineup for ES Sétif - Khedairia, Debbari, Laouafi, Laribi (Fellahi, 81'), Bekakchi, Karaoui (Laidouni, 81'), Merbah (Dali, 69'), Kendouci, Deghmoum, Lomotey (Amoura, 57'), Ghacha.

== Confederation Cup ==
=== First round ===
23 December 2020 First leg	Renaissance (Chad)	Cancelled (Note: Renaissance failed to appear for the first leg in N'Djamena following disputes between the Ministry of Youth and Sports in the country and the Chadian Football Federation, which prevented the club from playing the match in their home country. A decision will be made by CAF regarding this incident.)	(Algeria) ES Sétif	N'Djamena
15:00 UTC+1		Report		Stadium: Stade Omnisports Idriss Mahamat Ouya; Attendance: 0 (close doors); Referee: André Kolissala (Central African Republic)

5 January 2021 Second leg	ES Sétif (Algeria)	Cancelled	(Chad) Renaissance	Sétif
18:00 UTC+1		Report		Stadium: Stade 8 Mai 1945; Attendance: 0 (close doors)

=== Play-off round ===
14 February 2021 First leg	Asante Kotoko (Ghana)	1–2	(Algeria) ES Sétif	Kumasi
16:00 UTC+0	Opoku 70'	Report	Amoura 74'; Kendouci 81'	Stadium: Baba Yara Stadium; Referee: Antoine Effa Essouma (Cameroon)

21 February 2021 Second leg	ES Sétif (Algeria)	0–0 (2–1 agg.)	(Ghana) Asante Kotoko	Sétif
18:00 UTC+1		Report		Stadium: Stade 8 Mai 1945; Attendance: 0 (close doors); Referee: Haythem Guirat (Tunisia)

=== Group stage ===
==== Group A ====
Pos	Team	Pld	W	D	L	GF	GA	GD	Pts	Qualification	ENY	ORL	ESS	AHL
1	(Nigeria) Enyimba	6	3	0	3	6	8	−2	9 (Note: Tied on head-to-head points (3), on head-to-head goal difference (0) and on head-to-head goals scored (2). Head-to-head away goals scored: Enyimba 1, Orlando Pirates 0.)	Advance to knockout stage	—	1–0	2–1	2–1
2	(South Africa) Orlando Pirates	6	2	3	1	5	2	+3	9	Advance to knockout stage	2–1	—	0–0	3–0
3	(Algeria) ES Sétif	6	2	2	2	5	3	+2	8		3–0	0–0	—	1–0
4	(Libya) Al Ahly Benghazi	6	2	1	3	3	6	−3	7		1–0	0–0	1–0	—

Source: Soccerway
Notes:

10 March 2021 Matchday 1	ES Sétif (Algeria)	0–0	(South Africa) Orlando Pirates	Accra (Ghana) (Note: The ES Sétif v Orlando Pirates match, originally scheduled to be played at Stade 8 Mai 1945, Sétif, was played outside Algeria at Accra Sports Stadium, Accra (Ghana) due to restrictions related to the COVID-19 pandemic imposed by Algeria on travelers from South Africa out of concern of the variant 501.V2.)
19:00 (19:00 UTC+0)		Report		Stadium: Accra Sports Stadium; Attendance: 0 (close doors); Referee: Bakary Gassama (Gambia)

17 March 2021 Matchday 2	Al Ahly Benghazi (Libya)	1–0	(Algeria) ES Sétif	Cairo (Egypt) (Note: The Al Ahly Benghazi v ES Sétif match, originally scheduled to be played at Benina Martyrs Stadium, Benghazi, was played outside Libya at Petro Sport Stadium, Cairo (Egypt) due to unavailability.)
19:00 (21:00 UTC+2)	Alwadawi 3'	Report		Stadium: Petro Sport Stadium; Attendance: 0 (close doors); Referee: Adil Zourak (Morocco)

4 April 2021 Matchday 3	Enyimba (Nigeria)	2–1	(Algeria) ES Sétif	Aba
13:00 (14:00 UTC+1)	Oladapo 40'; Omoyele 60'	Report	Bakrar 13'	Stadium: Enyimba International Stadium; Attendance: 0 (close doors); Referee: Souleiman Ahmed Djama (Djibouti)

11 April 2021 Matchday 4	ES Sétif (Algeria)	3–0	(Nigeria) Enyimba	Sétif
19:00 (20:00 UTC+1)	Karaoui 31'; Amoura 45+2'; Djahnit 65' (pen.)	Report		Stadium: Stade 8 Mai 1945; Attendance: 0 (close doors); Referee: Amin Omar (Egypt)

21 April 2021 Matchday 5	Orlando Pirates (South Africa)	0–0	(Algeria) ES Sétif	Johannesburg
13:00 (15:00 UTC+2)		Report		Stadium: Orlando Stadium; Attendance: 0 (close doors); Referee: Celso Alvação (Mozambique)

28 April 2021 Matchday 6	ES Sétif (Algeria)	1–0	(Libya) Al Ahly Benghazi	Sétif
21:00 (22:00 UTC+1)	Alqmati 2' (o.g.)	Report		Stadium: Stade 8 Mai 1945; Attendance: 0 (close doors); Referee: Youssef Essrayri (Tunisia)

== Squad information ==
=== Playing statistics ===
No.	Pos	Player	Nat	Ligue 1			League Cup			Conf. Cup			Total		
No.	Pos	Player	Nat	App	St	G	App	St	G	App	St	G	App	St	G
Goalkeepers
1	GK	Sofiane Khedairia	(Algeria)	34	0	0	1	0	0	8	0	0	43	0	0
16	GK	Said Daas	(Algeria)	0	0	0	0	0	0	0	0	0	0	0	0
23	GK	Khairi Barki	(Algeria)	4	0	0	0	0	0	0	0	0	4	0	0
Defenders
4	CB	Amine Biaz	(Algeria)	1	0	0	0	0	0	0	0	0	1	0	0
5	CB	Halim Meddour	(Algeria)	0	0	0	0	0	0	2	0	0	2	0	0
8	LB	Houari Ferhani	(Algeria)	12	0	1	0	0	0	2	0	0	14	0	1
13	RB	Abdelkrim Nemdil	(Algeria)	37	0	0	0	0	0	8	0	0	45	0	0
18	CB	Hocine Laribi	(Algeria)	15	0	1	1	0	0	4	0	0	20	0	1
20	RB	Abdelhak Debbari	(Algeria)	36	0	2	1	0	0	7	0	0	44	0	2
21	RB	Amir Laidouni	(Algeria)	17	0	0	1	0	0	3	0	0	21	0	0
22	CB	Ibrahim Bekakchi	(Algeria)	32	0	1	1	0	0	4	0	0	37	0	1
44	CB	Ibrahim Hachoud	(Algeria)	14	0	0	0	0	0	4	0	0	18	0	0
Midfielders
3	DM	Messala Merbah	(Algeria)	26	0	1	1	0	0	5	0	0	32	0	1
6	DM	Ahmed Kendouci	(Algeria)	34	0	10	1	0	0	8	0	1	43	0	11
7	AM	Akram Djahnit	(Algeria)	18	0	5	0	0	0	6	0	1	24	0	6
12	AM	Houdail Bassem Charama	(Algeria)	0	0	0	0	0	0	0	0	0	0	0	0
14	DM	Amir Karaoui	(Algeria)	31	0	0	1	0	0	8	0	1	40	0	1
15	AM	Abderrahim Deghmoum	(Algeria)	27	0	3	1	0	0	7	0	0	35	0	3
19	MF	Youcef Dali	(Algeria)	26	0	0	1	0	0	6	0	0	33	0	0
25	MF	Mohamed Djahli	(Algeria)	0	0	0	0	0	0	0	0	0	0	0	0
47	LW	Mohamed El Amine Amoura	(Algeria)	35	0	15	1	0	0	8	0	2	44	0	17
	AM	Abdelmoumene Djabou	(Algeria)	13	0	4	0	0	0	0	0	0	13	0	4
Forwards
9	ST	Habib Bouguelmouna	(Algeria)	0	0	0	0	0	0	0	0	0	0	0	0
10	LW	Malick Touré	(Mali)	8	0	2	0	0	0	4	0	0	12	0	2
11	LW	Youcef Laouafi	(Algeria)	23	0	4	1	0	0	5	0	0	29	0	4
17	FW	Khier Anes Belaïd	(Algeria)	0	0	0	0	0	0	0	0	0	0	0	0
24	ST	Yasser Berbache	(Algeria)	19	0	4	0	0	0	3	0	0	22	0	4
26	LW	Ismaïl Saadi	(Algeria)	18	0	3	0	0	0	7	0	0	25	0	3
27	RW	Houssam Ghacha	(Algeria)	25	0	10	1	0	1	4	0	0	30	0	11
28	FW	Daniel Lomotey	(Ghana)	9	0	2	1	0	0	2	0	0	12	0	2
42	FW	Youcef Fellahi	(Algeria)	13	0	0	1	0	0	1	0	0	15	0	0
88	FW	Monsef Bakrar	(Algeria)	17	0	3	0	0	0	3	0	1	20	0	4
	FW	Aymen Belbey	(Algeria)	4	0	0	0	0	0	1	0	0	5	0	0
Total				38		69	1		1	8		7	47		77

=== Goalscorers ===
Includes all competitive matches. The list is sorted alphabetically by surname when total goals are equal.

No.	Nat.	Player	Pos.	L 1	LC	CC 3	TOTAL
47	(Algeria)	Mohamed El Amine Amoura	MF	15	0	2	17
27	(Algeria)	Houssam Ghacha	FW	10	1	0	11
6	(Algeria)	Ahmed Kendouci	MF	8	0	1	9
11	(Algeria)	Youcef Laouafi	DF	4	0	0	4
24	(Algeria)	Yasser Berbache	FW	4	0	0	4
15	(Algeria)	Abderrahim Deghmoum	MF	3	0	0	3
7	(Algeria)	Akram Djahnit	MF	3	0	0	3
26	(Algeria)	Ismaïl Saadi	FW	3	0	0	3
10	(Mali)	Malick Touré	FW	2	0	0	2
88	(Algeria)	Monsef Bakrar	FW	2	0	1	2
20	(Algeria)	Abdelhak Debbari	DF	2	0	0	2
8	(Algeria)	Houari Ferhani	DF	1	0	0	1
14	(Algeria)	Amir Karaoui	MF	0	0	1	1
22	(Algeria)	Ibrahim Bekakchi	DF	1	0	0	1
Own Goals				0	0	1	1
Totals				56	1	7	64

== Transfers ==
=== In ===
Date	Pos	Player	From club	Transfer fee	Source
5 October 2020	GK	(Algeria) Khairi Barki	CR Belouizdad	Free transfer	
15 October 2020	MF	(Algeria) Messala Merbah	(Tunisia) CS Chebba	Free transfer	
29 January 2021	FW	(Ghana) Daniel Lomotey	(Ghana) WAFA	118,000 $	
8 April 2021	MF	(Algeria) Abdelmoumene Djabou	MC Alger	Free transfer	
8 April 2021	DF	(Algeria) Nasreddine Benlebna	USM Bel Abbès	Free transfer	
11 April 2021	DF	(Algeria) Mohamed Khoutir Ziti	(Libya) Nasr Benghazi	Free transfer	

=== Out ===
Date	Pos	Player	To club	Transfer fee	Source
10 July 2020	FW	(Algeria) Ishak Talal Boussouf	(Belgium) Kortrijk	800,000 €	
6 August 2020	MF	(Algeria) Zakaria Draoui	CR Belouizdad	Free transfer	
17 August 2020	DF	(Algeria) Saâdi Radouani	USM Alger	Free transfer	

== New contracts ==
No.	Pos	Player	Contract length	Contract end	Date	Source
1	GK	(Algeria) Sofiane Khedairia	1 years	2022	23 August 2020	
9	FW	(Algeria) Habib Bouguelmouna	2 years	2022	13 September 2020	
14	DM	(Algeria) Amir Karaoui	2 years	2022	14 September 2020	
