= 2021 CAF Confederation Cup final =

African football tournament final

- Event: 2020–21 CAF Confederation Cup
Raja CA	JS Kabylie
(Morocco)	(Algeria)
2	1
- Date: 10 July 2021
- Venue: Stade de l'Amitié, Cotonou, Benin
- Man of the Match: Soufiane Rahimi (Raja CA)
- Referee: Victor Gomes (South Africa)
- Weather: Partly cloudy 26 °C (79 °F); 83% humidity

The 2021 CAF Confederation Cup final was the final match of the 2020–21 CAF Confederation Cup, the 18th season of Africa's premier club football tournament organised by CAF under the CAF Confederation Cup title after the merger of CAF Cup and African Cup Winners' Cup. It was played at the Stade de l'Amitié in Cotonou, Benin on 10 July 2021.

Raja CA defeated JS Kabylie 2–1 to secure their second ever CAF Confederation Cup title. They also earned the right to play against Al Ahly S.C the CAF Champions league winner in the 2021–22 CAF Super Cup.

== Teams ==
Team	Zone	Previous finals appearances (bold indicates winners)
(Morocco) Raja CA	UNAF (North Africa)	1 (**2018**)
(Algeria) JS Kabylie	UNAF (North Africa)	None

== Venue ==
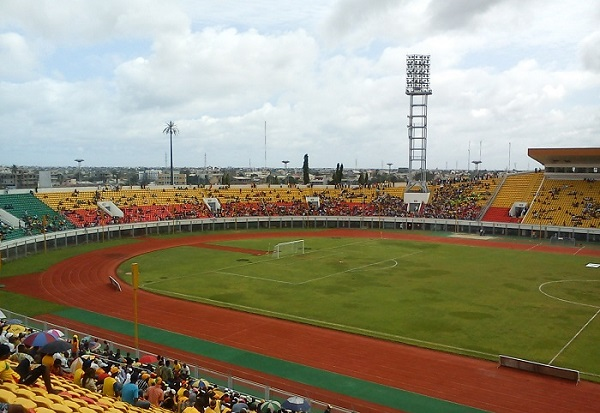
Stade de l'Amitié in Cotonou, Benin hosted the match.

For the second consecutive year, the final was played as a single match at a pre-selected venue by CAF instead of a two-legged fixtures format, which was being used in the competition since 1966.

On 16 May 2021, Stade de l'Amitié in Cotonou, Benin was chosen by a CAF Executive Committee to host the final during a meeting in Kigali, Rwanda.

== Road to the final ==
Note: In all results below, the score of the finalist is given first (H: home; A: away).

(Morocco) Raja CA				Round	(Algeria) JS Kabylie			
**Champions League**					**Confederation Cup**			
Opponent	Agg.	1st leg	2nd leg	Qualifying rounds (CL, CC)	Opponent	Agg.	1st leg	2nd leg
(Senegal) Teungueth	0–0 (1–3 p)	0–0 (A)	0–0 (H)	First round	(Niger) USGN	4–1	2–1 (A)	2–0 (H)
**Confederation Cup**								
(Tunisia) US Monastir	1–1 (6–5 p)	1–0 (H)	0–1 (A)	Play-off round	(Mali) Stade Malien	2–2 (a)	1–2 (A)	1–0 (H)
Opponent	Result			Group stage	Opponent	Result		
(Tanzania) Namungo	1–0 (H)			Matchday 1	(Cameroon) Coton Sport	1–0 (H)		
(Zambia) Nkana	2–0 (A)			Matchday 2	(Zambia) NAPSA Stars	2–2 (A)		
(Egypt) Pyramids	2–0 (H)			Matchday 3	(Morocco) RS Berkane	0–0 (A)		
(Egypt) Pyramids	3–0 (A)			Matchday 4	(Morocco) RS Berkane	0–0 (H)		
(Tanzania) Namungo	3–0 (A)			Matchday 5	(Cameroon) Coton Sport	2–1 (A)		
(Zambia) Nkana	2–0 (H)			Matchday 6	(Zambia) NAPSA Stars	2–1 (H)		
**Group D winners**: Pos / Team / Pld / Pts; **1** / (Morocco) Raja CA / **6** / **18**; 2 / (Egypt) Pyramids / 6 / **12**; 3 / (Zambia) Nkana / 6 / **6**; 4 / (Tanzania) Namungo / 6 / **0**; Source: Soccerway				Final standings	**Group B winners**: Pos / Team / Pld / Pts; **1** / (Algeria) JS Kabylie / **6** / **12**; 2 / (Cameroon) Coton Sport / 6 / **9**; 3 / (Morocco) RS Berkane / 6 / **8**; 4 / (Zambia) NAPSA Stars / 6 / **4**; Source: Soccerway			
Opponent	Agg.	1st leg	2nd leg	Knockout stage	Opponent	Agg.	1st leg	2nd leg
(South Africa) Orlando Pirates	5–1	1–1 (A)	4–0 (H)	Quarter-finals	(Tunisia) CS Sfaxien	2–1	1–0 (A)	1–1 (H)
(Egypt) Pyramids	0–0 (5–4 p)	0–0 (A)	0–0 (H)	Semi-finals	(Cameroon) Coton Sport	5–1	2–1 (A)	3–0 (H)

== Format ==
The final was played as a single match at a pre-selected venue, with the winner of semi-final 1 according to the knockout stage draw designated as the "home" team for administrative purposes. If scores were level after full time, extra time would not to be played and the winner would be decided by a penalty shoot-out (Regulations Article III. 28).

== Match ==
10 July 2021
19:00 GMT
(20:00 UTC+1)

Raja CA (Morocco)	2–1	(Algeria) JS Kabylie
Rahimi 5'; Malango 14'	Report	Zaka 46'

Stade de l'Amitié, Cotonou
Referee: Victor Gomes (South Africa)

**Raja CA**	**JS Kabylie**

GK	1	(Morocco) Anas Zniti (c)
CB	24	(Morocco) Marouane Hadhoudi
CB	15	(Netherlands) Ilias Haddad
RB	29	(Morocco) Abdelilah Madkour	(yellow card) 90+4'
LB	27	(Morocco) Oussama Soukhane
CM	16	(Morocco) Omar Arjoune	(red card) 63'
CM	17	(Morocco) Zakaria El Wardi
RW	10	(Morocco) Mahmoud Benhalib		(substituted off) 58'
AM	18	(Morocco) Abdelilah Hafidi		(substituted off) 71'
LW	21	(Morocco) Soufiane Rahimi		(substituted off) 90+1'
CF	28	(Democratic Republic of the Congo) Ben Malango		(substituted off) 90+1'
Substitutes:
GK	22	(Morocco) Mohamed Bouamira
DF	3	(Morocco) Mohamed Souboul
DF	20	(Morocco) Abdeljalil Jbira
MF	6	(Democratic Republic of the Congo) Fabrice Ngoma		(substituted on) 71'
MF	19	(Morocco) Mohamed Zrida		(substituted on) 58'
MF	23	(Morocco) Mohamed Al Makaazi		(substituted on) 90+1'
MF	26	(Morocco) Riad Idbouiguiguine
FW	14	(Morocco) Zakaria Habti
FW	30	(Morocco) Ayoub Nanah		(substituted on) 90+1'
Manager:
(Tunisia) Lassaad Chabbi

GK	25	(Algeria) Oussama Benbot
CB	31	(Algeria) Ahmed Kerroum	(yellow card) 84'
CB	2	(Algeria) Ahmed Ait Abdessalem
CB	5	(Algeria) Badreddine Souyad
RM	22	(Algeria) Walid Bencherifa
CM	13	(Algeria) Aziz Benabdi
CM	8	(Algeria) Juba Oukaci		(substituted off) 69'
LM	21	(Algeria) Malik Raiah		(substituted off) 46'
AM	7	(Algeria) Mohamed Benchaira
CF	17	(Algeria) Rédha Bensayah (c)	(yellow card) 34'	(substituted off) 76'
CF	9	(Algeria) Zaka		(substituted off) 76'
Substitutes:
GK	1	(Algeria) Mohamed Idir Hadid
DF	3	(Algeria) Abdelmoumen Chikhi
DF	4	(Algeria) Bilal Tizi Bouali
DF	37	(Algeria) Fares Djabri
MF	6	(Algeria) Ammar El Orfi
MF	14	(Libya) Abdussalam Tubal		(substituted on) 76'
MF	38	(Algeria) Kouceila Boualia		(substituted on) 69'
FW	11	(Algeria) Rezki Hamroune		(substituted on) 46'
FW	34	(Algeria) Massinissa Nezla		(substituted on) 76'
Manager:
(France) Denis Lavagne

Man of the Match:
Soufiane Rahimi
(Raja CA)

Assistant referees:
Zakhele Siwela (South Africa)
Souru Phatsoane (Lesotho)
Fourth official:
Jean-Jacques Ndala (DR Congo)
Video assistant referee:
Janny Sikazwe (Zambia)
Assistant video assistant referees:
Gerson Emiliano dos Santos (Angola)
Pacifique Ndabihawenimana (Burundi)

**Match rules**

- 90 minutes.
- Penalty shoot-out if scores level.
- Nine named substitutes, of which up to five may be used. (Note: Each team was only given three opportunities to make substitutions, excluding substitutions made at half-time.)

== See also ==
- 2021 CAF Champions League Final
- 2021–22 CAF Super Cup
