= 2020–21 CAF Confederation Cup knockout stage =

- Dates: 16 May – 10 July 2021

The 2020–21 CAF Confederation Cup knockout stage started on 16 May with the quarter-finals and will conclude on 10 July 2021 with the final to decide the champions of the 2020–21 CAF Confederation Cup. A total of eight teams are competing in the knockout stage.

Times are GMT as listed by CAF (local times, even if not different, are in parentheses).

== Round and draw dates ==
The schedule is as follows.

Round	Draw date	First leg	Second leg
Quarter-finals	30 April 2021	16 May 2021	23 May 2021
Semi-finals	30 April 2021	20 June 2021	27 June 2021
Final	30 April 2021	10 July 2021	

== Format ==
Each tie in the knockout stage, apart from the final, is played over two legs, with each team playing one leg at home. The team that scores more goals on aggregate over the two legs advances to the next round. If the aggregate score is level, the away goals rule is applied, i.e. the team that scores more goals away from home over the two legs advances. If away goals are also equal, then extra time is not played and the winners are decided by a penalty shoot-out. In the final, which is played as a single match, if the score is level at the end of normal time, extra time won't also be played and the winners will be decided by a penalty shoot-out. The mechanism of the draws for each round is as follows:

- In the draw for the quarter-finals, the four group winners are seeded, and the four group runners-up are unseeded. The seeded teams are drawn against the unseeded teams, with the seeded teams hosting the second leg. Teams from the same group cannot be drawn against each other, while teams from the same association can be drawn against each other.
- In the draws for semi-finals, there are no seedings, and teams from the same group or the same association can be drawn against each other. As the draws for the quarter-finals and semi-finals are held together before the quarter-finals are played, the identity of the quarter-final winners is not known at the time of the semi-final draw.

== Qualified teams ==
The knockout stage involves the 8 teams which qualify as winners and runners-up of each of the eight groups in the group stage.

Group	Winners	Runners-up
A	(Nigeria) Enyimba	(South Africa) Orlando Pirates
B	(Algeria) JS Kabylie	(Cameroon) Coton Sport
C	(Senegal) ASC Jaraaf	(Tunisia) CS Sfaxien
D	(Morocco) Raja Casablanca	(Egypt) Pyramids

== Bracket ==
The bracket of the knockout stage is determined as follows:

Round	Matchups
Quarter-finals	(Group winners host second leg, matchups decided by draw, teams from same group cannot play each other): QF1; QF2; QF3; QF4
Semi-finals	(Matchups and order of legs decided by draw, between winners QF1, QF2, QF3, QF4): SF1; SF2
Final	Winners SF1 and SF2 will face each other to decide the champions

The bracket was decided after the draw for the knockout stage (quarter-finals and semi-finals), which was held on 30 April 2021, 14:00 CAT (UTC+2), at the CAF headquarters in Cairo, Egypt.

Quarter-finals
1	(Egypt) Pyramids	4	1	5
8	(Nigeria) Enyimba	1	1	2
4	(South Africa) Orlando Pirates	1	0	1
5	(Morocco) Raja Casablanca	1	4	5
2	(Cameroon) Coton Sport (a)	1	1	2
7	(Senegal) ASC Jaraaf	0	2	2
3	(Tunisia) CS Sfaxien	0	1	1
6	(Algeria) JS Kabylie	1	1	2

Semi-finals
(Egypt) Pyramids	0	0	0 (4)
(Morocco) Raja Casablanca	0	0	0 (5)
(Cameroon) Coton Sport	1	0	1
(Algeria) JS Kabylie	2	3	5

Final
(Morocco) Raja Casablanca	2
(Algeria) JS Kabylie	1

== Quarter-finals ==
The draw for the quarter-finals was held on 30 April 2021.

=== Summary ===
The first legs were played on 16 May, and the second legs were played on 23 May 2021.

Team 1	Agg.	Team 2	1st leg	2nd leg
CS Sfaxien (Tunisia)	1–2	(Algeria) JS Kabylie	0–1	1–1
Orlando Pirates (South Africa)	1–5	(Morocco) Raja Casablanca	1–1	0–4
Pyramids (Egypt)	5–2	(Nigeria) Enyimba	4–1	1–1
Coton Sport (Cameroon)	2–2 (a)	(Senegal) ASC Jaraaf	1–0	1–2

=== Matches ===
16 May 2021
16:00 (17:00 UTC+1)

CS Sfaxien (Tunisia)	0–1	(Algeria) JS Kabylie
	Report	Bensayah 61' (pen.)

Stade Taïeb Mhiri, Sfax
Referee: Mahmoud El Banna (Egypt)
23 May 2021
16:00 (17:00 UTC+1)

JS Kabylie (Algeria)	1–1	(Tunisia) CS Sfaxien
Bensayah 39' (pen.)	Report	Harzi 82' (pen.)

Stade du 1er Novembre 1954, Tizi Ouzou
Referee: Rédouane Jiyed (Morocco)

JS Kabylie won 2–1 on aggregate.

16 May 2021
13:00 (15:00 UTC+2)

Orlando Pirates (South Africa)	1–1	(Morocco) Raja Casablanca
Pule 39'	Report	Malango 60'

Orlando Stadium, Johannesburg
Referee: Peter Waweru (Kenya)
23 May 2021
16:00 (17:00 UTC+1)

Raja Casablanca (Morocco)	4–0	(South Africa) Orlando Pirates
Malango 6', 36'; El Wardi 22'; Rahimi 31'	Report

Stade Mohammed V, Casablanca
Referee: Mustapha Ghorbal (Algeria)

Raja Casablanca won 5–1 on aggregate.

16 May 2021
16:00 (18:00 UTC+2)

Pyramids (Egypt)	4–1	(Nigeria) Enyimba
Ramadan 15'; El Said 49'; Adel 58', 67'	Report	Mbaoma 1'

30 June Stadium, Cairo
Referee: Victor Gomes (South Africa)
23 May 2021
13:00 (14:00 UTC+1)

Enyimba (Nigeria)	1–1	(Egypt) Pyramids
Iwuala 40'	Report	Adel 32'

Enyimba International Stadium, Aba
Referee: Sadok Selmi (Tunisia)

Pyramids won 5–2 on aggregate.

16 May 2021
13:00 (14:00 UTC+1)

Coton Sport (Cameroon)	1–0	(Senegal) ASC Jaraaf
Araina 89'	Report

Roumdé Adjia Stadium, Garoua
Referee: Eric Otogo-Castane (Gabon)
23 May 2021
16:00 (16:00 UTC+0)

ASC Jaraaf (Senegal)	2–1	(Cameroon) Coton Sport
Diène 34'; N'Diaye 55'	Report	Sanou 21'

Stade Lat-Dior, Thiès
Referee: Boubou Traoré (Mali)

2–2 on aggregate. Coton Sport won on away goals.

== Semi-finals ==
The draw for the semi-finals was held on 30 April 2021 (after the quarter-finals draw).

=== Summary ===
The first legs were played on 20 June, and the second legs were played on 27 June 2021.

Team 1	Agg.	Team 2	1st leg	2nd leg
Pyramids (Egypt)	0–0 (4–5 p)	(Morocco) Raja Casablanca	0–0	0–0
Coton Sport (Cameroon)	1–5	(Algeria) JS Kabylie	1–2	0–3

=== Matches ===
20 June 2021
19:00 (21:00 UTC+2)

Pyramids (Egypt)	0–0	(Morocco) Raja Casablanca
	Report

30 June Stadium, Cairo
Referee: Pacifique Ndabihawenimana (Burundi)
27 June 2021
19:00 (20:00 UTC+1)

Raja Casablanca (Morocco)	0–0	(Egypt) Pyramids
	Report
Penalties
Rahimi (penalty scored); Malango (penalty missed); Al Warfali (penalty missed); El Wardi (penalty scored); Benhalib (penalty scored); Zrida (penalty scored); Ngoma (penalty missed); Madkour (penalty scored)	5–4	(penalty scored) El Said; (penalty missed) Ramadan; (penalty scored) Wadi; (penalty scored) Samy; (penalty missed) Farouk; (penalty scored) Galal; (penalty missed) Tawfik; (penalty missed) Hamdy

Stade Mohammed V, Casablanca
Referee: Janny Sikazwe (Zambia)

0–0 on aggregate. Raja Casablanca won 5–4 on penalties.

20 June 2021
16:00 (17:00 UTC+1)

Coton Sport (Cameroon)	1–2	(Algeria) JS Kabylie
Araina 29'	Report	Kerroum 45+2'; Etame 62' (o.g.)

Roumdé Adjia Stadium, Garoua
Referee: Amin Omar (Egypt)
27 June 2021
19:00 (20:00 UTC+1)

JS Kabylie (Algeria)	3–0	(Cameroon) Coton Sport
Zaka 6', 45+1'; Souyad 37' (pen.)	Report

Stade du 5 Juillet, Algiers (Note: JS Kabylie played their home match against Coton Sport at Stade du 5 Juillet, Algiers, instead of their regular home stadium Stade du 1er Novembre 1954, Tizi Ouzou.)
Referee: Sadok Selmi (Tunisia)

JS Kabylie won 5–1 on aggregate.

== Final ==
The final was played on 10 July 2021 at Stade de l'Amitié, Cotonou.

10 July 2021
19:00 (20:00 UTC+1)

Raja CA (Morocco)	2–1	(Algeria) JS Kabylie
Rahimi 5'; Malango 14'	Report	Zaka 46'

Stade de l'Amitié, Cotonou
Referee: Victor Gomes (South Africa)
