= 2020–21 CAF Confederation Cup group stage =

- Dates: 10 March – 28 April 2021

Tournament statistics
- Matches played: 48
- Goals scored: 86 (1.79 per match)

The 2020–21 CAF Confederation Cup group stage started on 10 March and ended on 28 April 2021. A total of 16 teams competed in the group stage to decide the eight places in the knockout stage of the 2020–21 CAF Confederation Cup.

== Draw ==
The draw for the group stage was held on 22 February 2021, 13:00 GMT (15:00 local time, UTC+2), at the CAF headquarters in Cairo, Egypt. The 16 teams, which consist of the 15 winners of the play-off round of qualifying and defending champions RS Berkane, were drawn into four groups of four.

The teams were seeded by their performances in the CAF competitions for the previous five seasons (CAF 5-year ranking points shown in parentheses). Each group contained one team from each of Pot 1, Pot 2, Pot 3, and Pot 4, and each team was allocated to the positions in their group according to their pot:

Pot	Pot 1	Pot 2	Pot 3	Pot 4
Teams	(Morocco) RS Berkane (47 pts); (Tunisia) Étoile du Sahel (47 pts); (Morocco) Raja CA (39 pts); (Nigeria) Enyimba (21 pts)	(Egypt) Pyramids (20 pts); (Tunisia) CS Sfaxien (16 pts); (Algeria) ES Sétif (12 pts); (Algeria) JS Kabylie (10 pts)	(South Africa) Orlando Pirates (8 pts); (Zambia) Nkana (8 pts); (Burkina Faso) Salitas (2 pts); (Cameroon) Coton Sport (2 pts)	(Tanzania) Namungo; (Libya) Al Ahly Benghazi; (Senegal) ASC Jaraaf; (Zambia) NAPSA Stars

Notes

1. ^{†} Winners of the play-off round, whose identity was not known at the time of draw.

== Format ==
In each group, teams play against each other home-and-away in a round-robin format. The winners and runners-up of each group will advance to the quarter-finals of the knockout stage.

=== Tiebreakers ===
Teams are ranked according to points (3 points for a win, 1 point for a draw, 0 points for a loss). If tied on points, tiebreakers are applied in the following order (Regulations III. 20 & 21):

1. Points in head-to-head matches among tied teams;
2. Goal difference in head-to-head matches among tied teams;
3. Goals scored in head-to-head matches among tied teams;
4. Away goals scored in head-to-head matches among tied teams;
5. If more than two teams are tied, and after applying all head-to-head criteria above, a subset of teams are still tied, all head-to-head criteria above are reapplied exclusively to this subset of teams;
6. Goal difference in all group matches;
7. Goals scored in all group matches;
8. Away goals scored in all group matches;
9. Drawing of lots.

== Schedule ==
The schedule of each matchday is as follows. Kick-off times are fixed at 13:00, 16:00 and 19:00 GMT.

During the Islamic holy month Ramadan (12 April – 12 May), CAF gave clubs the option to play their home matches late in the day to avoid having large number of players fasting during matches.

Matchday	Dates	Matches
Matchday 1	10 March 2021	Team 1 vs. Team 4, Team 2 vs. Team 3
Matchday 2	17 March 2021	Team 3 vs. Team 1, Team 4 vs. Team 2
Matchday 3	4 April 2021	Team 4 vs. Team 3, Team 1 vs. Team 2
Matchday 4	11 April 2021	Team 3 vs. Team 4, Team 2 vs. Team 1
Matchday 5	21 April 2021	Team 4 vs. Team 1, Team 3 vs. Team 2
Matchday 6	28 April 2021	Team 1 vs. Team 3, Team 2 vs. Team 4

== Groups ==
=== Group A ===
Pos	Team	Pld	W	D	L	GF	GA	GD	Pts	Qualification	ENY	ORL	ESS	AHL
1	(Nigeria) Enyimba	6	3	0	3	6	8	−2	9 (Note: Tied on head-to-head points (3), on head-to-head goal difference (0) and on head-to-head goals scored (2). Head-to-head away goals scored: Enyimba 1, Orlando Pirates 0.)	Advance to knockout stage	—	1–0	2–1	2–1
2	(South Africa) Orlando Pirates	6	2	3	1	5	2	+3	9	Advance to knockout stage	2–1	—	0–0	3–0
3	(Algeria) ES Sétif	6	2	2	2	5	3	+2	8		3–0	0–0	—	1–0
4	(Libya) Al Ahly Benghazi	6	2	1	3	3	6	−3	7		1–0	0–0	1–0	—

Source: Soccerway
Rules for classification: Group stage tiebreakers
Notes:
10 March 2021
13:00 (14:00 UTC+1)

Enyimba (Nigeria)	2–1	(Libya) Al Ahly Benghazi
Oladapo 10'; Mbaoma 43'	Report	Imhamed 18' (pen.)

Enyimba International Stadium, Aba
Referee: Jean Claude Ishimwe (Rwanda)
10 March 2021
19:00 (19:00 UTC+0)

ES Sétif (Algeria)	0–0	(South Africa) Orlando Pirates
	Report

Accra Sports Stadium, Accra (Ghana) (Note: The ES Sétif v Orlando Pirates match, originally scheduled to be played at Stade 8 Mai 1945, Sétif, was played outside Algeria at Accra Sports Stadium, Accra (Ghana) due to restrictions related to the COVID-19 pandemic imposed by Algeria on travelers from South Africa out of concern of the variant 501.V2.)
Referee: Bakary Gassama (Gambia)

17 March 2021
16:00 (18:00 UTC+2)

Orlando Pirates (South Africa)	2–1	(Nigeria) Enyimba
Hotto 27'; Mabasa 89'	Report	Oladapo 45+2' (pen.)

Orlando Stadium, Johannesburg
Referee: Blaise Yuven Ngwa (Cameroon)
17 March 2021
19:00 (21:00 UTC+2)

Al Ahly Benghazi (Libya)	1–0	(Algeria) ES Sétif
Alwadawi 3'	Report

Petro Sport Stadium, Cairo (Egypt) (Note: The Al Ahly Benghazi v ES Sétif match, originally scheduled to be played at Benina Martyrs Stadium, Benghazi, was played outside Libya at Petro Sport Stadium, Cairo (Egypt) due to unavailability.)
Referee: Adil Zourak (Morocco)

4 April 2021
13:00 (14:00 UTC+1)

Enyimba (Nigeria)	2–1	(Algeria) ES Sétif
Oladapo 40'; Omoyele 60'	Report	Bakrar 13'

Enyimba International Stadium, Aba
Referee: Souleiman Ahmed Djama (Djibouti)
4 April 2021
19:00 (21:00 UTC+2)

Al Ahly Benghazi (Libya)	0–0	(South Africa) Orlando Pirates
	Report

Benina Martyrs Stadium, Benghazi
Referee: Mahmood Ismail (Sudan)

11 April 2021
16:00 (18:00 UTC+2)

Orlando Pirates (South Africa)	3–0	(Libya) Al Ahly Benghazi
Nyauza 26'; Mabasa 41'; Dlamini 69'	Report

Orlando Stadium, Johannesburg
Referee: Kalilou Traoré (Ivory Coast)
11 April 2021
19:00 (20:00 UTC+1)

ES Sétif (Algeria)	3–0	(Nigeria) Enyimba
Karaoui 31'; Amoura 45+2'; Djahnit 65' (pen.)	Report

Stade 8 Mai 1945, Sétif
Referee: Amin Omar (Egypt)

21 April 2021
13:00 (15:00 UTC+2)

Orlando Pirates (South Africa)	0–0	(Algeria) ES Sétif
	Report

Orlando Stadium, Johannesburg
Referee: Celso Alvação (Mozambique)
22 April 2021 (Note: The Al Ahly Benghazi v Enyimba match, originally scheduled to be played on 21 April 2021 at 21:00 local time (UTC+2), was postponed for 24 hours due to unavailability of direct flights from Nigeria to Libya, which prevented Enyimba from appearing for the match in time.)
21:00 (23:00 UTC+2)

Al Ahly Benghazi (Libya)	1–0	(Nigeria) Enyimba
El Taib 40'	Report

Benina Martyrs Stadium, Benghazi
Referee: Adalbert Diouf (Senegal)

28 April 2021
21:00 (22:00 UTC+1)

Enyimba (Nigeria)	1–0	(South Africa) Orlando Pirates
Olisema 90+5'	Report

Enyimba International Stadium, Aba
Referee: Helder Martins de Carvalho (Angola)
28 April 2021
21:00 (22:00 UTC+1)

ES Sétif (Algeria)	1–0	(Libya) Al Ahly Benghazi
Alqmati 2' (o.g.)	Report

Stade 8 Mai 1945, Sétif
Referee: Youssef Essrayri (Tunisia)

=== Group B ===
Pos	Team	Pld	W	D	L	GF	GA	GD	Pts	Qualification	JSK	COT	RSB	NAP
1	(Algeria) JS Kabylie	6	3	3	0	7	4	+3	12	Advance to knockout stage	—	1–0	0–0	2–1
2	(Cameroon) Coton Sport	6	3	0	3	10	6	+4	9	Advance to knockout stage	1–2	—	2–0	5–1
3	(Morocco) RS Berkane	6	2	2	2	4	4	0	8		0–0	2–1	—	2–0
4	(Zambia) NAPSA Stars	6	1	1	4	5	12	−7	4		2–2	0–1	1–0	—

Source: Soccerway
Rules for classification: Group stage tiebreakers
10 March 2021
19:00 (20:00 UTC+1)

RS Berkane (Morocco)	2–0	(Zambia) NAPSA Stars
Regragui 12'; Iajour 45'	Report

Stade Municipal de Berkane, Berkane
Referee: Sekou Ahmed Touré (Guinea)
10 March 2021
19:00 (20:00 UTC+1)

JS Kabylie (Algeria)	1–0	(Cameroon) Coton Sport
Souyad 88'	Report

Stade du 1er Novembre 1954, Tizi Ouzou
Referee: Mutaz Ibrahim (Libya)

17 March 2021
13:00 (14:00 UTC+1)

Coton Sport (Cameroon)	2–0	(Morocco) RS Berkane
Marou 54'; Sanou 72'	Report

Roumdé Adjia Stadium, Garoua
Referee: Sadok Selmi (Tunisia)
17 March 2021
13:00 (15:00 UTC+2)

NAPSA Stars (Zambia)	2–2	(Algeria) JS Kabylie
Mukeya 12'; Soko 63'	Report	Simwanza 82' (o.g.); Nezla 90'

National Heroes Stadium, Lusaka
Referee: Kalilou Traoré (Ivory Coast)

4 April 2021
13:00 (15:00 UTC+2)

NAPSA Stars (Zambia)	0–1	(Cameroon) Coton Sport
	Report	Daman 16'

National Heroes Stadium, Lusaka
Referee: Samuel Uwikunda (Rwanda)
4 April 2021
19:00 (20:00 UTC+1)

RS Berkane (Morocco)	0–0	(Algeria) JS Kabylie
	Report

Stade Municipal de Berkane, Berkane
Referee: Issa Sy (Senegal)

11 April 2021
13:00 (14:00 UTC+1)

Coton Sport (Cameroon)	5–1	(Zambia) NAPSA Stars
Araina 21'; Marou 35'; Sanou 70'; Ebandza Dzo 87'; Alemi 90+1'	Report	Soko 90+3'

Roumdé Adjia Stadium, Garoua
Referee: Peter Waweru (Kenya)
11 April 2021
19:00 (20:00 UTC+1)

JS Kabylie (Algeria)	0–0	(Morocco) RS Berkane
	Report

Stade du 1er Novembre 1954, Tizi Ouzou
Referee: Norman Matemera (Zimbabwe)

21 April 2021
13:00 (14:00 UTC+1)

Coton Sport (Cameroon)	1–2	(Algeria) JS Kabylie
Alemi 89' (pen.)	Report	Bensayah 63'; Bencherifa 68'

Roumdé Adjia Stadium, Garoua
Referee: Mohamed Maarouf (Egypt)
21 April 2021
16:00 (18:00 UTC+2)

NAPSA Stars (Zambia)	1–0	(Morocco) RS Berkane
Soko 53'	Report

National Heroes Stadium, Lusaka
Referee: Georges Gatogato (Burundi)

28 April 2021
22:00 (23:00 UTC+1)

RS Berkane (Morocco)	2–1	(Cameroon) Coton Sport
Namsaoui 9'; Laachir 52'	Report	Araina 87'

Stade Municipal de Berkane, Berkane
Referee: Daniel Laryea (Ghana)
28 April 2021
22:00 (23:00 UTC+1)

JS Kabylie (Algeria)	2–1	(Zambia) NAPSA Stars
Bencherifa 29'; Boualia 57'	Report	Mayuka 90'

Stade du 1er Novembre 1954, Tizi Ouzou
Referee: Mohamed Ali Moussa (Niger)

=== Group C ===
Pos	Team	Pld	W	D	L	GF	GA	GD	Pts	Qualification	JAR	CSS	ETS	SAL
1	(Senegal) ASC Jaraaf	6	3	2	1	5	3	+2	11	Advance to knockout stage	—	1–1	1–0	2–0
2	(Tunisia) CS Sfaxien	6	2	4	0	6	3	+3	10	Advance to knockout stage	0–0	—	2–2	1–0
3	(Tunisia) Étoile du Sahel	6	2	2	2	6	5	+1	8		2–0	0–0	—	2–1
4	(Burkina Faso) Salitas	6	1	0	5	2	8	−6	3		0–1	0–2	1–0	—

Source: Soccerway
Rules for classification: Group stage tiebreakers
10 March 2021
13:00 (14:00 UTC+1)

CS Sfaxien (Tunisia)	1–0	(Burkina Faso) Salitas
Harzi 77' (pen.)	Report

Stade Taïeb Mhiri, Sfax
Referee: Sabri Mohamed Fadul (Sudan)
10 March 2021
16:00 (17:00 UTC+1)

Étoile du Sahel (Tunisia)	2–0	(Senegal) ASC Jaraaf
Lahmar 65', 90+3' (pen.)	Report

Stade Olympique de Radès, Tunis (Note: Étoile du Sahel played their home matches at Stade Olympique de Radès, Tunis, instead of their regular home stadium Stade Olympique de Sousse, Sousse, which was undergoing renovation.)
Referee: Ahmed El Ghandour (Egypt)

17 March 2021
16:00 (16:00 UTC+0)

Salitas (Burkina Faso)	1–0	(Tunisia) Étoile du Sahel
Boissy 82'	Report

Stade du 4 Août, Ouagadougou
Referee: Messie Nkounkou (Congo)
17 March 2021
16:00 (16:00 UTC+0)

ASC Jaraaf (Senegal)	1–1	(Tunisia) CS Sfaxien
Sylla 90+2'	Report	Sokari 70'

Stade Lat-Dior, Thiès
Referee: Al Hadi Mahamat (Chad)

4 April 2021
16:00 (16:00 UTC+0)

ASC Jaraaf (Senegal)	2–0	(Burkina Faso) Salitas
Diène 12'; Paye 44'	Report

Stade Lat-Dior, Thiès
Referee: Hassan Corneh (Liberia)
4 April 2021
16:00 (17:00 UTC+1)

Étoile du Sahel (Tunisia)	0–0	(Tunisia) CS Sfaxien
	Report

Stade Olympique de Radès, Tunis
Referee: Nabil Boukhalfa (Algeria)

11 April 2021
16:00 (17:00 UTC+1)

CS Sfaxien (Tunisia)	2–2	(Tunisia) Étoile du Sahel
Ghouma 68'; Chaouat 90+3' (pen.)	Report	Sfaxi 10'; Kechrida 32'

Stade Taïeb Mhiri, Sfax
Referee: Samir Guezzaz (Morocco)
12 April 2021 (Note: The Salitas v ASC Jaraaf match, originally scheduled to be played on 11 April 2021, was postponed for 24 hours due to the 2021 Beninese presidential election.)
13:00 (14:00 UTC+1)

Salitas (Burkina Faso)	0–1	(Senegal) ASC Jaraaf
	Report	Paye 10'

Stade Charles de Gaulle, Porto-Novo (Benin) (Note: Starting from their second group stage home fixture, Salitas played their home matches at Stade Charles de Gaulle, Porto-Novo (Benin), instead of their regular home stadium Stade du 4 Août, Ouagadougou, which was undergoing renovation.)
Referee: Djindo Louis Houngnandande (Benin)

21 April 2021
16:00 (16:00 UTC+0)

ASC Jaraaf (Senegal)	1–0	(Tunisia) Étoile du Sahel
Paye 25'	Report

Stade Lat-Dior, Thiès
Referee: Fabricio Duarte (Cape Verde)
21 April 2021
16:00 (17:00 UTC+1)

Salitas (Burkina Faso)	0–2	(Tunisia) CS Sfaxien
	Report	Chaouat 7' (pen.); Eduwo 51'

Stade Charles de Gaulle, Porto-Novo (Benin)
Referee: Hassan Mohamed Hagi (Somalia)

28 April 2021
21:00 (22:00 UTC+1)

Étoile du Sahel (Tunisia)	2–1	(Burkina Faso) Salitas
Lahmar 6'; Coulibaly 47'	Report	Dramé 72'

Stade Olympique de Radès, Tunis
Referee: Abdulrazg Ahmed (Libya)
28 April 2021
21:00 (22:00 UTC+1)

CS Sfaxien (Tunisia)	0–0	(Senegal) ASC Jaraaf
	Report

Stade Taïeb Mhiri, Sfax
Referee: Samuel Uwikunda (Rwanda)

=== Group D ===
Pos	Team	Pld	W	D	L	GF	GA	GD	Pts	Qualification	RCA	PYR	NKA	NAM
1	(Morocco) Raja CA	6	6	0	0	13	0	+13	18	Advance to knockout stage	—	2–0	2–0	1–0
2	(Egypt) Pyramids	6	4	0	2	7	5	+2	12	Advance to knockout stage	0–3	—	3–0	1–0
3	(Zambia) Nkana	6	2	0	4	2	8	−6	6		0–2	0–1	—	1–0
4	(Tanzania) Namungo	6	0	0	6	0	9	−9	0		0–3	0–2	0–1	—

Source: Soccerway
Rules for classification: Group stage tiebreakers
10 March 2021
16:00 (17:00 UTC+1)

Raja CA (Morocco)	1–0	(Tanzania) Namungo
Rahimi 54' (pen.)	Report

Stade Mohammed V, Casablanca
Referee: Hassan Corneh (Liberia)
10 March 2021
16:00 (18:00 UTC+2)

Pyramids (Egypt)	3–0	(Zambia) Nkana
Wadi 2'; Issa 9'; Farouk 90+1'	Report

30 June Stadium, Cairo
Referee: Thierry Nkurunziza (Burundi)

17 March 2021
13:00 (16:00 UTC+3)

Namungo (Tanzania)	0–2	(Egypt) Pyramids
	Report	Ramadan 71' (pen.); Gaber 84'

National Stadium, Dar es Salaam (Note: Namungo played their home matches at National Stadium, Dar es Salaam, instead of their regular home stadium Majaliwa Stadium, Lindi, which did not meet CAF requirements.)
Referee: Mohamed Ali Moussa (Niger)
17 March 2021
16:00 (18:00 UTC+2)

Nkana (Zambia)	0–2	(Morocco) Raja CA
	Report	Rahimi 47' (pen.); Sadaoui 87'

Levy Mwanawasa Stadium, Ndola (Note: Nkana played their home matches at Levy Mwanawasa Stadium, Ndola, instead of their regular home stadium Nkana Stadium, Kitwe, due to unavailability.)
Referee: Ali Mohamed Adelaide (Comoros)

4 April 2021
14:00 (17:00 UTC+3) (Note: The Namungo v Nkana match, originally scheduled to be played at 16:00 local time (UTC+3), was postponed for one hour due to unconfirmed reasons.)

Namungo (Tanzania)	0–1	(Zambia) Nkana
	Report	Chikwekwe 69'

National Stadium, Dar es Salaam
Referee: Omar Abdulkadir Artan (Somalia)
4 April 2021
16:00 (17:00 UTC+1)

Raja CA (Morocco)	2–0	(Egypt) Pyramids
Ekramy 15' (o.g.); Malango 21'	Report

Stade Mohammed V, Casablanca
Referee: Sekou Ahmed Touré (Guinea)

11 April 2021
13:00 (15:00 UTC+2)

Nkana (Zambia)	1–0	(Tanzania) Namungo
Tshimenga 71'	Report

Levy Mwanawasa Stadium, Ndola
Referee: Brighton Chimene (Zimbabwe)
11 April 2021
19:00 (21:00 UTC+2)

Pyramids (Egypt)	0–3	(Morocco) Raja CA
	Report	Ngoma 15'; Malango 42'; Rahimi 77'

30 June Stadium, Cairo
Referee: Helder Martins de Carvalho (Angola)

21 April 2021
13:00 (15:00 UTC+2)

Nkana (Zambia)	0–1	(Egypt) Pyramids
	Report	El Said 78'

Levy Mwanawasa Stadium, Ndola
Referee: Joseph Ogabor (Nigeria)
21 April 2021
13:00 (16:00 UTC+3)

Namungo (Tanzania)	0–3	(Morocco) Raja CA
	Report	Haddad 8'; Ngoma 14'; Habti 36'

National Stadium, Dar es Salaam
Referee: Chelanget Sabila (Uganda)

28 April 2021
19:00 (21:00 UTC+2)

Pyramids (Egypt)	1–0	(Tanzania) Namungo
Adel 65'	Report

30 June Stadium, Cairo
Referee: Jean Ouattara (Burkina Faso)
28 April 2021
21:00 (22:00 UTC+1)

Raja CA (Morocco)	2–0	(Zambia) Nkana
Idbouiguiguine 18'; Sadaoui 42'	Report

Stade Mohammed V, Casablanca
Referee: Sabri Mohamed Fadul (Sudan)
