= 2020–21 CAF Confederation Cup =

International football competition in Africa

2020–21 Total CAF Confederation Cup
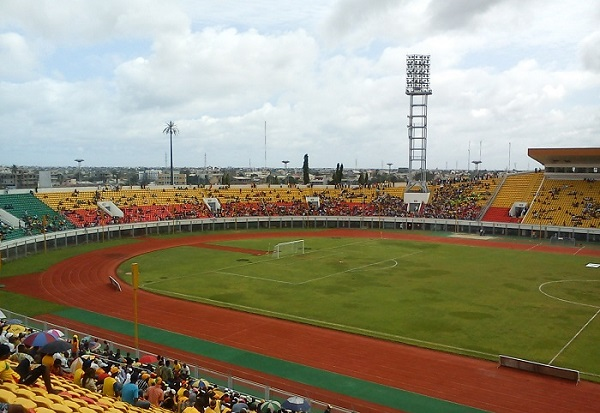
- Stade de l'Amitié in Cotonou, Benin, hosted the final

Tournament details
- Dates: Qualifying: 27 November 2020 – 19 February 2021; Competition proper: 10 March – 10 July 2021
- Teams: Competition proper: 16; Total: 51+16 (from 39 associations)

Final positions
- Champions: (Morocco) Raja Casablanca (2nd title)
- Runners-up: (Algeria) JS Kabylie

Tournament statistics
- Matches played: 61
- Goals scored: 114 (1.87 per match)
- Top scorer(s): (Democratic Republic of the Congo) Ben Malango (6 goals)

The 2020–21 CAF Confederation Cup (officially the 2020–21 Total CAF Confederation Cup for sponsorship reasons) was the 18th edition of Africa's secondary club football tournament organized by the Confederation of African Football (CAF), under the current CAF Confederation Cup title after the merger of CAF Cup and African Cup Winners' Cup.

The winners of the 2020–21 CAF Confederation Cup will earn the right to play against the winners of the 2020–21 CAF Champions League in the 2021–22 CAF Super Cup.

RS Berkane were the defending champions, but were eliminated in the group stage.

== Association team allocation ==
All 56 CAF member associations may enter the CAF Confederation Cup, with the 12 highest ranked associations according to their CAF 5-year ranking eligible to enter two teams in the competition. As a result, theoretically a maximum of 68 teams could enter the tournament (plus 16 teams eliminated from the CAF Champions League which enter the play-off round) – although this level has never been reached.

For the 2020–21 CAF Confederation Cup, the CAF uses the 2016–2020 CAF 5-year ranking, which calculates points for each entrant association based on their clubs' performance over those 5 years in the CAF Champions League and CAF Confederation Cup. The criteria for points are the following:

	CAF Champions League	CAF Confederation Cup
Winners	6 points	5 points
Runners-up	5 points	4 points
Losing semi-finalists	4 points	3 points
Losing quarter-finalists (from 2017)	3 points	2 points
3rd place in groups	2 points	1 point
4th place in groups	1 point	0.5 point

The points are multiplied by a coefficient according to the year as follows:

- 2019–20: × 5
- 2018–19: × 4
- 2018: × 3
- 2017: × 2
- 2016: × 1

== Teams ==
Due to the COVID-19 pandemic, associations may abandon their domestic competitions and select the representatives in CAF club competitions. Associations may register their representatives during the engagement window between 1 September and 20 October 2020. All engaged teams must respect the Club Licensing procedure and cooperate with their respective Associations, as non-licensed clubs would be refused participation.

The following 51 teams from 39 associations entered the competition.

- Teams in **bold** received a bye to the first round.
- The other teams entered the preliminary round.

Associations are shown according to their 2016–2020 CAF 5-year ranking – those with a ranking score have their rank and score (in parentheses) indicated.

Associations eligible to enter two teams (Top 12 associations)
Association	Rank (Pts)	Team	Qualifying method
Morocco	1 (190)	**RS Berkane**	Title holders (2019–20 CAF Confederation Cup winners); 2019–20 Botola third place
Morocco	1 (190)	TAS Casablanca	2018–19 Moroccan Throne Cup winners
Egypt	2 (167)	**Pyramids**	2019–20 Egyptian Premier League third place
Egypt	2 (167)	Al Mokawloon Al Arab	2019–20 Egyptian Premier League fourth place
Tunisia	3 (140)	US Monastir	2019–20 Tunisian Ligue Professionnelle 1 third place
Tunisia	3 (140)	**Étoile du Sahel**	2019–20 Tunisian Ligue Professionnelle 1 fourth place
DR Congo	4 (83)	AS Maniema Union	2019–20 Linafoot third place
DR Congo	4 (83)	**DC Motema Pembe**	2019–20 Linafoot fourth place
Algeria	5 (81)	**ES Sétif**	2019–20 Algerian Ligue Professionnelle 1 third place
Algeria	5 (81)	**JS Kabylie**	2019–20 Algerian Ligue Professionnelle 1 fourth place
South Africa	6 (68.5)	**Orlando Pirates**	2019–20 South African Premier Division third place
South Africa	6 (68.5)	Bloemfontein Celtic	2019–20 Nedbank Cup runners-up
Zambia	7 (43)	Green Eagles	2019–20 Zambian Super League third place
Zambia	7 (43)	NAPSA Stars	2019–20 Zambian Super League fourth place
Nigeria	8 (39)	Rivers United	2019–20 Nigeria Professional Football League third place by points per game at time of abandonment
Nigeria	8 (39)	Kano Pillars	2019 Nigeria FA Cup
Guinea	9 (38)	AS Kaloum Star	2019–20 Guinée Championnat National third place after 13 rounds
Guinea	9 (38)	CI Kamsar	2019 Guinée Coupe Nationale runners-up
Angola	10 (36)	Bravos do Maquis	2019–20 Girabola third place at time of abandonment
Angola	10 (36)	Sagrada Esperança	2019–20 Angola Cup semi-finalists
Sudan	11 (29.5)	**El Hilal El Obeid**	2019–20 Sudan Premier League third place
Sudan	11 (29.5)	Al Amal Atbara	2019–20 Sudan Premier League fourth place
Libya	12 (16.5)	**Al Ahli Tripoli**	2017–18 Libyan Premier League third place
Libya	12 (16.5)	Al Ittihad	2018 Libyan Cup winners

Associations eligible to enter one team
Association	Rank (Pts)	Team	Qualifying method
Tanzania	13 (14)	Namungo	2019–20 Tanzania FA Cup runners-up
Ivory Coast	14 (13)	**FC San Pédro**	2019–20 Côte d'Ivoire Ligue 1 runners-up
Mozambique	17 (9)	**UD Songo**	2019 Taça de Moçambique winners
Congo	18 (8)	Étoile du Congo	2019 Coupe du Congo winners
Uganda	18 (8)	**KCCA**	2019–20 Uganda Premier League runners-up
Ghana	20 (6.5)	Ashanti Gold	2019 GFA Normalization Committee Special Competition Tier 2 winners
Mali	20 (6.5)	Yeelen Olympique	2019–20 Malian Première Division runners-up
Rwanda	22 (6)	AS Kigali	2019 Rwandan Cup winners
Eswatini	23 (5)	~~Mbabane Swallows~~	2019–20 Eswatini Premier League runners-up
Ethiopia	24 (4)	Fasil Kenema	2019 Ethiopian Cup winners
Botswana	25 (3)	Orapa United	2019–20 Mascom Top 8 Cup winners
Togo	25 (3)	UFC Sokodé	2019–20 Togolese Championnat National runners-up
Benin	27 (2.5)	**ESAE**	2019 Benin Cup winners
Mauritania	27 (2.5)	Tevragh-Zeina	2020 Coupe du Président de la République winners
Burkina Faso	29 (2)	Salitas	2018–19 Burkinabé Premier League runners-up
Cameroon	29 (2)	Coton Sport	2019–20 Elite One runners-up
Burundi	—	Musongati	2020 Burundian Cup winners
Chad	—	Renaissance	2020 Chad Premier League runners-up
Comoros	—	Ngazi Sport	2020 Comoros Cup runners-up
Djibouti	—	Arta/Solar7	2020 Djibouti Cup winners
Equatorial Guinea	—	Futuro Kings	2019–20 Equatoguinean Primera División Región Continental second place at time of abandonment
Gambia	—	GAMTEL	2019–20 GFA League First Division third place at time of abandonment
Niger	—	USGN	2019 Niger Cup runners-up
Senegal	—	ASC Jaraaf	2019–20 Senegal Premier League second place at time of abandonment
Somalia	—	Horseed	2019 Somalia Cup winners
South Sudan	—	Al Rabita	2020 South Sudan National Cup winners
Zanzibar	—	KVZ	2020 Zanzibari Cup winners

A further 16 teams eliminated from the 2020–21 CAF Champions League enter the play-off round.

Losers of 2020–21 CAF Champions League first round
(Mali) Stade Malien	(Morocco) Raja Casablanca	(Ivory Coast) RC Abidjan	(Niger) AS SONIDEP
(Libya) Al Ahly Benghazi	(Chad) ~~Gazelle~~	(Gabon) AS Bouenguidi	(Botswana) Jwaneng Galaxy
(Eswatini) Young Buffaloes	(Angola) 1º de Agosto	(Nigeria) Enyimba	(Ghana) Asante Kotoko
(Tunisia) CS Sfaxien	(Zambia) Nkana	(Zimbabwe) FC Platinum	(Kenya) Gor Mahia

Associations which did not enter a team

- Cape Verde
- Central African Republic
- Eritrea
- Guinea-Bissau
- Lesotho
- Liberia
- Madagascar
- Malawi
- Mauritius
- Namibia
- Réunion
- São Tomé and Príncipe
- Seychelles
- Sierra Leone

Associations which did not enter a team initially, but had a team transferred from Champions League

- Gabon (Rank: 31 (1))
- Kenya (Rank: 15 (11))
- Zimbabwe (Rank: 15 (11))

Notes

1. Algeria (ALG): The 2019–20 Algerian Ligue Professionnelle 1 and the 2019–20 Algerian Cup were abandoned by the Algerian Football Federation due to the COVID-19 pandemic in Algeria. ES Sétif and JS Kabylie, who were at third and fourth place of the 2019–20 Algerian Ligue Professionnelle 1 by points per game at the time of abandonment (table considered final), will represent Algeria in the 2020–21 CAF Confederation Cup.
2. Angola (ANG): The 2019–20 Girabola and the 2019–20 Angola Cup were abandoned by the Angolan Football Federation due to the COVID-19 pandemic in Angola. Bravos do Maquis, who were at third place of the 2019–20 Girabola at the time of abandonment, and Sagrada Esperança, who were one of the two cup semi-finalists who had not yet qualified for African club competitions, will represent Angola in the 2020–21 CAF Confederation Cup, since Interclube, who were the other cup semi-finalists who had not yet qualified for African club competitions, declined to enter.
3. Benin (BEN): The 2020 Benin Cup was abandoned by the Benin Football Federation due to the COVID-19 pandemic in Benin. ESAE, who were the 2019 Benin Cup winners, will represent Benin in the 2020–21 CAF Confederation Cup.
4. Botswana (BOT): The 2020 Botswana FA Cup was abandoned by the Botswana Football Association due to the COVID-19 pandemic in Botswana. Orapa United, who were the 2019–20 Mascom Top 8 Cup winners, will represent Botswana in the 2020–21 CAF Confederation Cup.
5. Burkina Faso (BFA): The 2020 Coupe du Faso was abandoned by the Burkinabé Football Federation due to the COVID-19 pandemic in Burkina Faso. Salitas, who were the 2018–19 Burkinabé Premier League runners-up, will represent Burkina Faso in the 2020–21 CAF Confederation Cup.
6. Cameroon (CMR): The 2020 Cameroonian Cup was abandoned by the Cameroonian Football Federation due to the COVID-19 pandemic in Cameroon. Coton Sport, who were at second place of the 2019–20 Elite One at the time of abandonment (table considered final), will represent Cameroon in the 2020–21 CAF Confederation Cup.
7. Cape Verde (CPV): The 2020 Taça Nacional de Cabo Verde was abandoned by the Cape Verdean Football Federation due to the COVID-19 pandemic in Cape Verde. No team will represent Cape Verde in the 2020–21 CAF Confederation Cup.
8. Central African Republic (CTA): The 2020 Central African Republic Coupe Nationale was abandoned by the Central African Football Federation due to the COVID-19 pandemic in the Central African Republic. No team will represent the Central African Republic in the 2020–21 CAF Confederation Cup.
9. Congo (CGO): The 2020 Coupe du Congo was abandoned by the Congolese Football Federation due to the COVID-19 pandemic in Congo. Étoile du Congo, who were the 2019 Coupe du Congo winners, will represent Congo in the 2020–21 CAF Confederation Cup.
10. DR Congo (COD): The 2019–20 Linafoot and 2020 Coupe du Congo DR were abandoned by the Congolese Association Football Federation due to the COVID-19 pandemic in DR Congo. AS Maniema Union and DC Motema Pembe, who were at third and fourth place of the 2019–20 Linafoot at the time of abandonment (table considered final), will represent DR Congo in the 2020–21 CAF Confederation Cup.
11. Equatorial Guinea (EQG): The 2020 Equatoguinean Cup was abandoned by the Equatoguinean Football Federation due to the COVID-19 pandemic in Equatorial Guinea. Futuro Kings, who were at Región Continental second place (better ranked second place between two regions) of the 2019–20 Equatoguinean Primera División at the time of abandonment, will represent Equatorial Guinea in the 2020–21 CAF Confederation Cup, since Leones Vegetarianos, who were at Región Insular first place (worse ranked first place between two regions) at the time of abandonment, declined to enter.
12. Eswatini (ESW): The 2020 Eswatini Cup was abandoned by the Eswatini Football Association due to the COVID-19 pandemic in Eswatini. Mbabane Swallows, who were at second place of the 2019–20 Eswatini Premier League at the time of abandonment (table considered final), were supposed to represent Eswatini in the 2020–21 CAF Confederation Cup. However, the Eswatini Football Association was not able to confirm the engagement of Mbabane Swallows by the CAF deadline.
13. Ethiopia (ETH): The 2020 Ethiopian Cup was abandoned by the Ethiopian Football Federation due to the COVID-19 pandemic in Ethiopia. Fasil Kenema, the 2019 Ethiopian Cup winners, will represent Ethiopia in the 2020–21 CAF Confederation Cup.
14. Gabon (GAB): The 2020 Coupe du Gabon Interclubs was abandoned by the Gabonese Football Federation due to the COVID-19 pandemic in Gabon. No team will represent Gabon in the 2020–21 CAF Confederation Cup, since AS Mangasport, who were at Group B first place (worse ranked first place between two groups) of the 2019–20 Gabon Championnat National D1 at the time of abandonment, declined to enter.
15. Gambia (GAM): The 2020 Gambian Cup was abandoned by the Gambia Football Federation due to the COVID-19 pandemic in the Gambia. Gamtel, who were at third place of the 2019–20 GFA League First Division at the time of abandonment, will represent Gambia in the 2020–21 CAF Confederation Cup.
16. Ghana (GHA): The 2020 Ghanaian FA Cup was abandoned by the Ghana Football Association due to the COVID-19 pandemic in Ghana. Ashanti Gold, who were the 2019 GFA Normalization Committee Special Competition Tier 2 winners, will represent Ghana in the 2020–21 CAF Confederation Cup.
17. Guinea (GUI): The 2019–20 Guinée Championnat National and the 2020 Guinée Coupe Nationale were abandoned by the Guinean Football Federation due to the COVID-19 pandemic in Guinea. Wakriya, who were at third place of the 2019–20 Guinée Championnat National after 13 rounds (last completed round at the time of abandonment), and CI Kamsar, who were the 2019 Guinée Coupe Nationale runners-up, will represent Guinea in the 2020–21 CAF Confederation Cup. Later, it was announced that AS Kaloum Star will replace Wakriya in the 2020–21 CAF Confederation Cup after the latter declined to enter the competition.
18. Ivory Coast (CIV): The 2020 Coupe de Côte d'Ivoire was abandoned by the Ivorian Football Federation due to the COVID-19 pandemic in Ivory Coast. FC San Pédro, who were at second place of the 2019–20 Côte d'Ivoire Ligue 1 at the time of abandonment (table considered final), will represent Ivory Coast in the 2020–21 CAF Confederation Cup.
19. Kenya (KEN): The 2020 FKF President's Cup was abandoned by the Football Kenya Federation due to the COVID-19 pandemic in Kenya. No team will represent Kenya in the 2020–21 CAF Confederation Cup.
20. Liberia (LBR): The 2020 Liberian FA Cup was abandoned by the Liberia Football Association due to the COVID-19 pandemic in Liberia. No team will represent Liberia in the 2020–21 CAF Confederation Cup.
21. Libya (LBY): Al Ahli Tripoli, the 2017–18 Libyan Premier League third place, and Al Ittihad, the 2018 Libyan Cup winners, will represent Libya in the 2020–21 CAF Confederation Cup, since the Libyan Premier League and Libyan Cup had been suspended by the Libyan Football Federation for two consecutive years due to the Libyan Civil War.
22. Madagascar (MAD): The 2020 Coupe de Madagascar was abandoned by the Malagasy Football Federation due to the COVID-19 pandemic in Madagascar. No team will represent Madagascar in the 2020–21 CAF Confederation Cup, since CNaPS Sport, who were the 2019 Coupe de Madagascar runners-up, declined to enter.
23. Malawi (MWI): No team will represent Malawi in the 2020–21 CAF Champions League, since Blue Eagles, who were the 2019 FISD Challenge Cup winners, declined to enter.
24. Mali (MLI): The 2020 Malian Cup was abandoned by the Malian Football Federation due to the COVID-19 pandemic in Mali. Yeelen Olympique, who were the 2019–20 Malian Première Division runners-up, will represent Mali in the 2020–21 CAF Confederation Cup.
25. Mauritius (MRI): The 2020 Mauritian Cup was abandoned by the Mauritius Football Association due to the COVID-19 pandemic in Mauritius. No team will represent Mauritius in the 2020–21 CAF Confederation Cup.
26. Niger (NIG): The 2020 Niger Cup was abandoned by the Nigerien Football Federation due to the COVID-19 pandemic in Niger. USGN, who were the 2019 Niger Cup runners-up, will represent Niger in the 2020–21 CAF Confederation Cup.
27. Nigeria (NGA): The 2019–20 Nigeria Professional Football League and the 2020 Nigeria Federation Cup were abandoned by the Nigeria Football Federation due to the COVID-19 pandemic in Nigeria. Rivers United, who were at third place of the 2019–20 Nigeria Professional Football League by points per game at the time of abandonment, and Kano Pillars, who were the 2019 Nigeria Federation Cup, will represent Nigeria in the 2020–21 CAF Confederation Cup.
28. Rwanda (RWA): The 2020 Rwandan Cup was abandoned by the Rwanda Football Federation due to the COVID-19 pandemic in Rwanda. AS Kigali, who were the 2019 Rwandan Cup winners, will represent Rwanda in the 2020–21 CAF Confederation Cup.
29. Senegal (SEN): The 2020 Senegal FA Cup was abandoned by the Senegalese Football Federation due to the COVID-19 pandemic in Senegal. ASC Jaraaf, who were at second place of the 2019–20 Senegal Premier League at the time of abandonment, will represent Senegal in the 2020–21 CAF Confederation Cup.
30. Sierra Leone (SLE): The 2020 Sierra Leonean FA Cup was abandoned by the Sierra Leone Football Association due to the COVID-19 pandemic in Sierra Leone. No team will represent Sierra Leone in the 2020–21 CAF Confederation Cup.
31. Togo (TOG): The 2020 Coupe du Togo was abandoned by the Togolese Football Federation due to the COVID-19 pandemic in Togo. Unisport de Sokodé, who were at second place of the 2019–20 Togolese Championnat National at the time of abandonment (table considered final), will represent Togo in the 2020–21 CAF Confederation Cup.
32. Uganda (UGA): The 2020 Uganda Cup was abandoned by the Federation of Uganda Football Associations due to the COVID-19 pandemic in Uganda. KCCA, who were at second place of the 2019–20 Uganda Premier League at the time of abandonment (table considered final), will represent Uganda in the 2020–21 CAF Confederation Cup.
33. Zimbabwe (ZIM): Highlanders, who were the 2019 Cup of Zimbabwe winners, declined to enter. No team will represent Zimbabwe in the 2020–21 CAF Confederation Cup.

== Schedule ==
The start of the competition was delayed due to the COVID-19 pandemic. On 1 September 2020, the CAF announced the new schedule. On 10 September 2020, the CAF decided to further delay the preliminary round, originally scheduled for 20–22 November (first legs) and 27–29 November (second legs), and the first round, originally scheduled for 11–13 December (first legs) and 18–20 December (second legs).

Schedule for 2020–21 CAF Confederation Cup
Phase	Round	Draw date	First leg	Second leg
Qualifying	Preliminary round	9 November 2020	27–29 November 2020	4–6 December 2020
Qualifying	First round	9 November 2020	22–23 December 2020	5–6 January 2021
Qualifying	Play-off round	8 January 2021	14 February 2021	21 February 2021
Group stage	Matchday 1	22 February 2021	10 March 2021	
Group stage	Matchday 2	22 February 2021	17 March 2021	
Group stage	Matchday 3	22 February 2021	4 April 2021	
Group stage	Matchday 4	22 February 2021	11 April 2021	
Group stage	Matchday 5	22 February 2021	21 April 2021	
Group stage	Matchday 6	22 February 2021	28 April 2021	
Knockout stage	Quarter-finals	30 April 2021	16 May 2021	23 May 2021
Knockout stage	Semi-finals	30 April 2021	20 June 2021	27 June 2021
Knockout stage	Final	30 April 2021	10 July 2021	

The original schedule of the competition, as planned before the pandemic, was as follows.

Original schedule for 2020–21 CAF Confederation Cup
Phase	Round	Draw date	First leg	Second leg
Qualifying	Preliminary round	TBD 2020	7–9 August 2020	21–23 August 2020
Qualifying	First round	TBD 2020	11–13 September 2020	25–27 September 2020
Qualifying	Play-off round	7 October 2020	25 October 2020	1 November 2020
Group stage	Matchday 1	4 November 2020	27–29 November 2020	
Group stage	Matchday 2	4 November 2020	4–6 December 2020	
Group stage	Matchday 3	4 November 2020	8–10 January 2021	
Group stage	Matchday 4	4 November 2020	22–24 January 2021	
Group stage	Matchday 5	4 November 2020	5–7 February 2021	
Group stage	Matchday 6	4 November 2020	12–14 February 2021	
Knockout stage	Quarter-finals	17 February 2021	5–7 March 2021	19–21 March 2021
Knockout stage	Semi-finals	17 February 2021	9–11 April 2021	23–25 April 2021
Knockout stage	Final	17 February 2021	23 May 2021	

== Qualifying rounds ==
The draw for the qualifying rounds was held on 9 November 2020 at the CAF headquarters in Cairo, Egypt. In the qualifying rounds, each tie will be played on a home-and-away two-legged basis. If the aggregate score is tied after the second leg, the away goals rule will be applied, and if still tied, extra time will not be played, and the penalty shoot-out will be used to determine the winner (Regulations III. 13 & 14).

=== Preliminary round ===
Team 1	Agg.	Team 2	1st leg	2nd leg
AS Kaloum Star (Guinea)	1–2	(Mauritania) Tevragh-Zeina	1–1	0–1
CI Kamsar (Guinea)	0–1	(Chad) Renaissance	0–0	0–1
Yeelen Olympique (Mali)	1–2	(Niger) USGN	0–1	1–1
GAMTEL (The Gambia)	w/o (Note: TAS Casablanca won on a walkover after GAMTEL withdrew from the second leg in Morocco citing financial constraints.)	(Morocco) TAS Casablanca	0–1	—
ASC Jaraaf (Senegal)	3–1	(Nigeria) Kano Pillars	3–1	0–0
Arta/Solar7 (Djibouti)	1–10	(Egypt) Al Mokawloon Al Arab	0–1	1–9
Al Ittihad (Libya)	7–1	(Somalia) Horseed	4–1	3–0
US Monastir (Tunisia)	3–2	(Ethiopia) Fasil Kenema	2–0	1–2
Namungo (Tanzania)	w/o (Note: Namungo won on walkover after Al Rabita were disqualified by CAF due to violation of regulations from the club and the South Sudan Football Association.)	(South Sudan) Al Rabita	3–0	—
Sagrada Esperança (Angola)	w/o (Note: Sagrada Esperança won on walkover after the Eswatini Football Association was not able to confirm the engagement of their representative in the CAF Confederation Cup by the CAF deadline.)	(Eswatini) Mbabane Swallows	—	—
Orapa United (Botswana)	2–2 (a)	(Rwanda) AS Kigali	2–1	0–1
Ngazi Sport (Comoros)	2–9	(Zambia) NAPSA Stars	1–5	1–4
Étoile du Congo (Republic of the Congo)	1–1 (a)	(Angola) Bravos do Maquis	1–1	0–0
Al Amal Atbara (Sudan)	4–0	(Zanzibar) KVZ	1–0	3–0
Ashanti Gold (Ghana)	1–2	(Burkina Faso) Salitas	0–0	1–2
Musongati (Burundi)	3–4	(Zambia) Green Eagles	2–2	1–2
UFC Sokodé (Togo)	1–2	(Cameroon) Coton Sport	0–2	1–0
AS Maniema Union (Democratic Republic of the Congo)	2–2 (2–3 p)	(South Africa) Bloemfontein Celtic	0–2	2–0
Futuro Kings (Equatorial Guinea)	3–3 (0–2 p)	(Nigeria) Rivers United	2–1	1–2

=== First round ===
The 16 winners of the first round advance to the play-off round, where they will be joined by the 16 losers of the Champions League first round.

Team 1	Agg.	Team 2	1st leg	2nd leg
Tevragh-Zeina (Mauritania)	0–2	(Morocco) RS Berkane	0–0	0–2
Renaissance (Chad)	w/o (Note: Renaissance failed to appear for the first leg in N'Djamena following disputes between the Ministry of Youth and Sports in the country and the Chadian Football Federation, which prevented the club from playing the match in their home country. As a result, Renaissance were disqualified from the competition by CAF, and ES Sétif won on walkover.)	(Algeria) ES Sétif	—	—
USGN (Niger)	1–4	(Algeria) JS Kabylie	1–2	0–2
TAS Casablanca (Morocco)	5–1	(Benin) ESAE	4–0	1–1
ASC Jaraaf (Senegal)	2–2 (a)	(Ivory Coast) FC San Pédro	0–1	2–1
Al Mokawloon Al Arab (Egypt)	1–2	(Tunisia) Étoile du Sahel	0–0	1–2
Al Ittihad (Libya)	2–4	(Egypt) Pyramids	0–1	2–3
US Monastir (Tunisia)	2–0	(Libya) Al Ahli Tripoli	2–0	0–0
Namungo (Tanzania)	5–3	(Sudan) El Hilal El Obeid	2–0	3–3
Sagrada Esperança (Angola)	w/o (Note: Orlando Pirates won on a walkover after Sagrada Esperança withdrew from the second leg in South Africa citing health concerns caused due to the new COVID-19 variant.)	(South Africa) Orlando Pirates	0–1	—
AS Kigali (Rwanda)	3–3 (a)	(Uganda) KCCA	2–0 (awd.) (Note: The first round first leg match between AS Kigali and KCCA could not be played after 2 of the 15 players from KCCA tested positive for COVID-19. Thus, KCCA were not able to name the required 15 players for holding the match, and subsequently, AS Kigali were awarded a technical 2–0 victory for the first leg by CAF in accordance with the regulations related to COVID-19.)	1–3
NAPSA Stars (Zambia)	1–1 (a)	(Mozambique) UD Songo	0–0	1–1
Bravos do Maquis (Angola)	1–3	(Democratic Republic of the Congo) DC Motema Pembe	0–1	1–2
Al Amal Atbara (Sudan)	0–3	(Burkina Faso) Salitas	0–1	0–2
Green Eagles (Zambia)	0–3	(Cameroon) Coton Sport	0–2	0–1
Bloemfontein Celtic (South Africa)	0–5	(Nigeria) Rivers United	0–2	0–3

=== Play-off round ===
The 15 winners of the play-off round will advance to the group stage to join RS Berkane, who advanced directly to the group stage as the winners of the first round with the best CAF 5-year ranking following Gazelle withdrawal from the competition after being transferred from the Champions League.

Team 1	Agg.	Team 2	1st leg	2nd leg
Enyimba (Nigeria)	1–1 (5–4 p)	(Nigeria) Rivers United	1–0	0–1
1º de Agosto (Angola)	5–7	(Tanzania) Namungo	2–6	3–1
FC Platinum (Zimbabwe)	0–2	(Senegal) ASC Jaraaf	0–1	0–1
CS Sfaxien (Tunisia)	5–2	(Rwanda) AS Kigali	4–1	1–1
Raja Casablanca (Morocco)	1–1 (6–5 p)	(Tunisia) US Monastir	1–0	0–1
Nkana (Zambia)	3–2	(Morocco) TAS Casablanca	2–0	1–2
Gor Mahia (Kenya)	2–3	(Zambia) NAPSA Stars	0–1	2–2
AS Bouenguidi (Gabon)	2–3	(Burkina Faso) Salitas	1–0	1–3
Asante Kotoko (Ghana)	1–2	(Algeria) ES Sétif	1–2	0–0
Young Buffaloes (Eswatini)	1–4	(Tunisia) Étoile du Sahel	1–2	0–2
AS SONIDEP (Niger)	0–2	(Cameroon) Coton Sport	0–1	0–1
Al Ahly Benghazi (Libya)	2–2 (8–7 p)	(Democratic Republic of the Congo) DC Motema Pembe	1–1	1–1
Stade Malien (Mali)	2–2 (a)	(Algeria) JS Kabylie	2–1	0–1
RC Abidjan (Ivory Coast)	0–4	(Egypt) Pyramids	0–2	0–2
Jwaneng Galaxy (Botswana)	0–4	(South Africa) Orlando Pirates	0–3	0–1

== Group stage ==
The draw for the group stage was held on 22 February 2021, 13:00 GMT (15:00 local time, UTC+2), at the CAF headquarters in Cairo, Egypt. The 16 teams, which consist of the 15 winners of the play-off round of qualifying and defending champions RS Berkane, were drawn into four groups of four.

The teams were seeded by their performances in the CAF competitions for the previous five seasons (CAF 5-year ranking points shown in parentheses). Each group contained one team from each of Pot 1, Pot 2, Pot 3, and Pot 4, and each team was allocated to the positions in their group according to their pot:

Pot	Pot 1	Pot 2	Pot 3	Pot 4
Teams	(Morocco) RS Berkane (47 pts); (Tunisia) Étoile du Sahel (47 pts); (Morocco) Raja CA (39 pts); (Nigeria) Enyimba (21 pts)	(Egypt) Pyramids (20 pts); (Tunisia) CS Sfaxien (16 pts); (Algeria) ES Sétif (12 pts); (Algeria) JS Kabylie (10 pts)	(South Africa) Orlando Pirates (8 pts); (Zambia) Nkana (8 pts); (Burkina Faso) Salitas (2 pts); (Cameroon) Coton Sport (2 pts)	(Tanzania) Namungo; (Libya) Al Ahly Benghazi; (Senegal) ASC Jaraaf; (Zambia) NAPSA Stars

Notes

1. ^{†} Winners of the play-off round, whose identity was not known at the time of draw.

In each group, teams play against each other home-and-away in a round-robin format. The winners and runners-up of each group will advance to the quarter-finals of the knockout stage.

Tiebreakers
Teams are ranked according to points (3 points for a win, 1 point for a draw, 0 points for a loss). If tied on points, tiebreakers are applied in the following order (Regulations III. 20 & 21):
1. Points in head-to-head matches among tied teams;
2. Goal difference in head-to-head matches among tied teams;
3. Goals scored in head-to-head matches among tied teams;
4. Away goals scored in head-to-head matches among tied teams;
5. If more than two teams are tied, and after applying all head-to-head criteria above, a subset of teams are still tied, all head-to-head criteria above are reapplied exclusively to this subset of teams;
6. Goal difference in all group matches;
7. Goals scored in all group matches;
8. Away goals scored in all group matches;
9. Drawing of lots.

=== Group A ===
Pos	Team	Pld	W	D	L	GF	GA	GD	Pts	Qualification	ENY	ORL	ESS	AHL
1	(Nigeria) Enyimba	6	3	0	3	6	8	−2	9 (Note: Tied on head-to-head points (3), on head-to-head goal difference (0) and on head-to-head goals scored (2). Head-to-head away goals scored: Enyimba 1, Orlando Pirates 0.)	Advance to knockout stage	—	1–0	2–1	2–1
2	(South Africa) Orlando Pirates	6	2	3	1	5	2	+3	9	Advance to knockout stage	2–1	—	0–0	3–0
3	(Algeria) ES Sétif	6	2	2	2	5	3	+2	8		3–0	0–0	—	1–0
4	(Libya) Al Ahly Benghazi	6	2	1	3	3	6	−3	7		1–0	0–0	1–0	—

Source: Soccerway

=== Group B ===
Pos	Team	Pld	W	D	L	GF	GA	GD	Pts	Qualification	JSK	COT	RSB	NAP
1	(Algeria) JS Kabylie	6	3	3	0	7	4	+3	12	Advance to knockout stage	—	1–0	0–0	2–1
2	(Cameroon) Coton Sport	6	3	0	3	10	6	+4	9	Advance to knockout stage	1–2	—	2–0	5–1
3	(Morocco) RS Berkane	6	2	2	2	4	4	0	8		0–0	2–1	—	2–0
4	(Zambia) NAPSA Stars	6	1	1	4	5	12	−7	4		2–2	0–1	1–0	—

Source: Soccerway

=== Group C ===
Pos	Team	Pld	W	D	L	GF	GA	GD	Pts	Qualification	JAR	CSS	ETS	SAL
1	(Senegal) ASC Jaraaf	6	3	2	1	5	3	+2	11	Advance to knockout stage	—	1–1	1–0	2–0
2	(Tunisia) CS Sfaxien	6	2	4	0	6	3	+3	10	Advance to knockout stage	0–0	—	2–2	1–0
3	(Tunisia) Étoile du Sahel	6	2	2	2	6	5	+1	8		2–0	0–0	—	2–1
4	(Burkina Faso) Salitas	6	1	0	5	2	8	−6	3		0–1	0–2	1–0	—

Source: Soccerway

=== Group D ===
Pos	Team	Pld	W	D	L	GF	GA	GD	Pts	Qualification	RCA	PYR	NKA	NAM
1	(Morocco) Raja CA	6	6	0	0	13	0	+13	18	Advance to knockout stage	—	2–0	2–0	1–0
2	(Egypt) Pyramids	6	4	0	2	7	5	+2	12	Advance to knockout stage	0–3	—	3–0	1–0
3	(Zambia) Nkana	6	2	0	4	2	8	−6	6		0–2	0–1	—	1–0
4	(Tanzania) Namungo	6	0	0	6	0	9	−9	0		0–3	0–2	0–1	—

Source: Soccerway

== Knockout stage ==
The mechanism of the draws for each round is as follows:

- In the draw for the quarter-finals, the four group winners are seeded, and the four group runners-up are unseeded. The seeded teams are drawn against the unseeded teams, with the seeded teams hosting the second leg. Teams from the same group cannot be drawn against each other, while teams from the same association can be drawn against each other.
- In the draws for semi-finals, there are no seedings, and teams from the same group or the same association can be drawn against each other. As the draws for the quarter-finals and semi-finals are held together before the quarter-finals are played, the identity of the quarter-final winners is not known at the time of the semi-final draw.

=== Bracket ===
The bracket was decided after the draw for the knockout stage (quarter-finals and semi-finals), which was held on 30 April 2021, 14:00 CAT (UTC+2), at the CAF headquarters in Cairo, Egypt.

Quarter-finals
1	(Egypt) Pyramids	4	1	5
8	(Nigeria) Enyimba	1	1	2
4	(South Africa) Orlando Pirates	1	0	1
5	(Morocco) Raja Casablanca	1	4	5
2	(Cameroon) Coton Sport (a)	1	1	2
7	(Senegal) ASC Jaraaf	0	2	2
3	(Tunisia) CS Sfaxien	0	1	1
6	(Algeria) JS Kabylie	1	1	2

Semi-finals
(Egypt) Pyramids	0	0	0 (4)
(Morocco) Raja Casablanca	0	0	0 (5)
(Cameroon) Coton Sport	1	0	1
(Algeria) JS Kabylie	2	3	5

Final
(Morocco) Raja Casablanca	2
(Algeria) JS Kabylie	1

=== Quarter-finals ===
Team 1	Agg.	Team 2	1st leg	2nd leg
CS Sfaxien (Tunisia)	1–2	(Algeria) JS Kabylie	0–1	1–1
Orlando Pirates (South Africa)	1–5	(Morocco) Raja Casablanca	1–1	0–4
Pyramids (Egypt)	5–2	(Nigeria) Enyimba	4–1	1–1
Coton Sport (Cameroon)	2–2 (a)	(Senegal) ASC Jaraaf	1–0	1–2

=== Semi-finals ===
Team 1	Agg.	Team 2	1st leg	2nd leg
Pyramids (Egypt)	0–0 (4–5 p)	(Morocco) Raja Casablanca	0–0	0–0
Coton Sport (Cameroon)	1–5	(Algeria) JS Kabylie	1–2	0–3

=== Final ===
The final was played on 10 July 2021 at Stade de l'Amitié, Cotonou.

10 July 2021
19:00 (20:00 UTC+1)

Raja CA (Morocco)	2–1	(Algeria) JS Kabylie
Rahimi 5'; Malango 14'	Report	Zaka 46'

Stade de l'Amitié, Cotonou
Referee: Victor Gomes (South Africa)

== Top goalscorers ==
Team eliminated / inactive for this round.

Rank	Player	Team	MD1	MD2	MD3	MD4	MD5	MD6	QF1	QF2	SF1	SF2	F	Total
1	(Democratic Republic of the Congo) Ben Malango	(Morocco) Raja Casablanca			1	1			1	2			1	6
2	(Morocco) Soufiane Rahimi	(Morocco) Raja Casablanca	1	1		1				1			1	5
3	(Cameroon) Lambert Araina	(Cameroon) Coton Sport				1		1	1		1			4
3	(Egypt) Ibrahim Adel	(Egypt) Pyramids						1	2	1				4
5	(Algeria) Zaka	(Algeria) JS Kabylie										2	1	3
5	(Algeria) Rédha Bensayah	(Algeria) JS Kabylie					1		1	1				3
5	(Burkina Faso) Sibiri Sanou	(Cameroon) Coton Sport		1		1				1				3
5	(Tunisia) Hamza Lahmar	(Tunisia) Étoile du Sahel	2					1						3
5	(Zambia) Doisy Soko	(Zambia) NAPSA Stars		1		1	1							3
5	(Senegal) Papa Youssou Paye	(Senegal) ASC Jaraaf			1	1	1							3
5	(Nigeria) Augustine Oladapo	(Nigeria) Enyimba	1	1	1									3

== See also ==
- 2020–21 CAF Champions League
- 2022 CAF Super Cup
