= Mohamed Amoura =

Algerian footballer (born 2000)

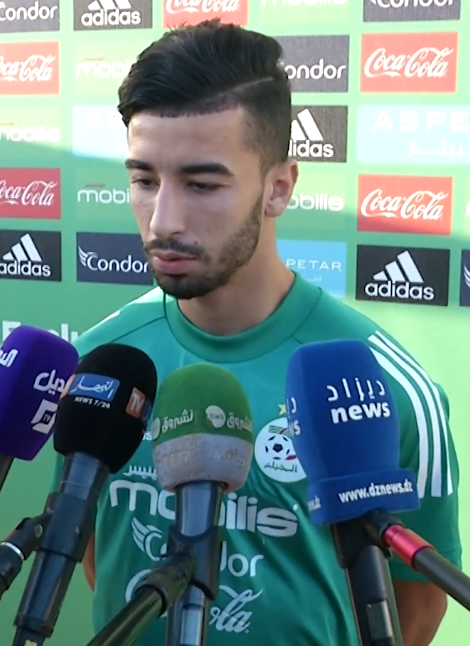
- Amoura with Algeria in 2021

Personal information
- Full name: Mohamed El Amine Amoura
- Date of birth: 9 May 2000 (age 26)
- Place of birth: Taher, Algeria
- Height: 1.70 m (5 ft 7 in)
- Position: Striker

Team information
- Current team: Nice (on loan from VfL Wolfsburg)
- Number: 9

Youth career
- 2013–2018: JS Djijel
- 2018–2020: ES Sétif

Senior career*
Years	Team	Apps	(Gls)
2020–2021	ES Sétif	36	(16)
2021–2023	Lugano	57	(14)
2023–2025	Union SG	32	(18)
2024–2025	→ VfL Wolfsburg (loan)	31	(10)
2025–	VfL Wolfsburg	30	(8)
2026–	→ Nice (loan)	5	(1)

International career^{‡}
2021	Algeria A'	1	(4)
2021–	Algeria	51	(19)
- * Club domestic league appearances and goals as of 18 October 2026 ‡ National team caps and goals as of 6 October 2026

Mohamed El Amine Amoura (Arabic: محمد الأمين عمورة; born 9 May 2000) is an Algerian professional footballer who plays as a striker for Ligue 1 club Nice, on loan from 2. Bundesliga club VfL Wolfsburg, and the Algeria national team.

== Club career ==
=== ES Setif ===
Amoura made his professional debut with ES Sétif in a 3–0 Algerian Ligue Professionnelle 1 win over CA Bordj Bou Arréridj on 17 February 2020, scoring his side's third goal after coming on as a late sub. He was in blistering form in the 2020–21 season, finishing with 13 goals in 25 games.

=== Lugano ===
On 29 August 2021, Amoura joined Swiss Super League club Lugano on a four-year contract.

=== Union SG ===
On 17 August 2023, Amoura joined Belgian Pro League club Union SG on a four-year contract with an option for another season.

=== VfL Wolfsburg (loan) ===
On 8 July 2024, Amoura moved to VfL Wolfsburg in Germany.

== International career ==
Amoura is eligible to represent Algeria (country of birth) and France (through his parents). Amoura holds both Algerian and French nationalities from his parents. Amoura was called up to represent the Algeria A' national team for a friendly on 17 June 2021. and scored four goals in a 5–1 win over Liberia.

That same year he was called up to the senior team. In December 2023, he was named in Algeria's squad for the 2023 Africa Cup of Nations. On March 25, 2025, he scored his first hat-trick for the Algeria national team.

On 31 May 2026, Amoura was named in Vladimir Petković's 26-man Algeria squad for the 2026 FIFA World Cup.

== Career statistics ==
=== Club ===
As of match played 18 October 2026

Appearances and goals by club, season and competition
Club	Season	League			National cup (Note: Includes Swiss Cup, Belgian Cup, DFB-Pokal)		Continental		Other		Total	
Club	Season	Division	Apps	Goals	Apps	Goals	Apps	Goals	Apps	Goals	Apps	Goals
ES Sétif	2019–20	Algerian Ligue 1	1	0	—		—		—		1	0
ES Sétif	2020–21	Algerian Ligue 1	35	15	—		8 (Note: Appearances in CAF Champions League)	2	1 (Note: Appearance in Algerian League Cup)	0	44	17
ES Sétif	Total		36	15	—		8	2	1	0	45	17
Lugano	2021–22	Swiss Super League	23	5	4	1	—		—		27	6
Lugano	2022–23	Swiss Super League	31	8	4	2	1 (Note: Appearance in UEFA Europa Conference League)	0	—		36	10
Lugano	2023–24	Swiss Super League	3	1	—		—		—		3	1
Lugano	Total		57	14	8	3	1	0	—		66	17
Union SG	2023–24	Belgian Pro League	32	18	4	2	9 (Note: Appearances in UEFA Europa League)	2	—		45	22
VfL Wolfsburg (loan)	2024–25	Bundesliga	31	10	3	0	—		—		34	10
VfL Wolfsburg	2025–26	Bundesliga	30	8	1	0	—		2 (Note: Appearances in Bundesliga relegation play-offs)	0	33	8
Nice	2026–27	Ligue 1	5	1	0	0	—		—		5	1
Career total			191	66	16	5	18	4	3	0	228	75

=== International ===
As of match played 6 October 2026

Appearances and goals by national team and year
National team	Year	Apps	Goals
Algeria	2021	2	0
Algeria	2022	7	2
Algeria	2023	10	3
Algeria	2024	12	3
Algeria	2025	10	11
Algeria	2026	10	0
Total		51	19

Scores and results list Algeria's goal tally first, score column indicates score after each Amoura goal.

List of international goals scored by Mohamed Amoura
No.	Date	Venue	Opponent	Score	Result	Competition	Ref.
1	8 June 2022	Benjamin Mkapa Stadium, Dar es Salaam, Tanzania	Tanzania	2–0	2–0	2023 Africa Cup of Nations qualification	
2	12 June 2022	Suheim bin Hamad Stadium, Doha, Qatar	Iran	2–1	2–1	Friendly	
3	18 June 2023	Japoma Stadium, Douala, Cameroon	Uganda	1–0	2–1	2023 Africa Cup of Nations qualification	
4	18 June 2023	Japoma Stadium, Douala, Cameroon	Uganda	2–0	2–1	2023 Africa Cup of Nations qualification	
5	12 October 2023	Chahid Hamlaoui Stadium, Constantine, Algeria	Cape Verde	1–0	5–1	Friendly	
6	9 January 2024	Stade de Kégué, Lomé, Togo	Burundi	4–0	4–0	Friendly	
7	10 October 2024	19 May 1956 Stadium, Annaba, Algeria	Togo	5–1	5–1	2025 Africa Cup of Nations qualification	
8	17 November 2024	Hocine Aït Ahmed Stadium, Tizi Ouzou, Algeria	Liberia	5–1	5–1	2025 Africa Cup of Nations qualification	
9	21 March 2025	Obed Itani Chilume Stadium, Francistown, Botswana	Botswana	2–0	3–1	2026 FIFA World Cup qualification	
10	21 March 2025	Obed Itani Chilume Stadium, Francistown, Botswana	Botswana	3–1	3–1	2026 FIFA World Cup qualification	
11	25 March 2025	Hocine Aït Ahmed Stadium, Tizi Ouzou, Algeria	Mozambique	1–0	5–1	2026 FIFA World Cup qualification	
12	25 March 2025	Hocine Aït Ahmed Stadium, Tizi Ouzou, Algeria	Mozambique	3–0	5–1	2026 FIFA World Cup qualification	
13	25 March 2025	Hocine Aït Ahmed Stadium, Tizi Ouzou, Algeria	Mozambique	5–1	5–1	2026 FIFA World Cup qualification	
14	4 September 2025	Hocine Aït Ahmed Stadium, Tizi Ouzou, Algeria	Botswana	1–0	3–1	2026 FIFA World Cup qualification	
15	9 October 2025	Miloud Hadefi Stadium, Oran, Algeria	Somalia	1–0	3–0	2026 FIFA World Cup qualification	
16	9 October 2025	Miloud Hadefi Stadium, Oran, Algeria	Somalia	3–0	3–0	2026 FIFA World Cup qualification	
17	14 October 2025	Hocine Aït Ahmed Stadium, Tizi Ouzou, Algeria	Uganda	1–1	2–1	2026 FIFA World Cup qualification	
18	14 October 2025	Hocine Aït Ahmed Stadium, Tizi Ouzou, Algeria	Uganda	2–1	2–1	2026 FIFA World Cup qualification	
19	13 November 2025	Prince Abdullah Al-Faisal Sports City Stadium, Jeddah, Saudi Arabia	Zimbabwe	2–0	3–1	Friendly	

== Honours ==
Lugano

- Swiss Cup: 2021–22

Union SG

- Belgian Cup: 2023–24

=== Individual ===
- Belgian Lion: 2024
- Belgian Golden Shoe: third place, 2023
- Ebony Shoe: runner-up, 2024
- Belgian Pro League Team of the Season: 2023–24
- Fennec d'Or: 2024
