= Sibiri Sanou =

Burkinabé footballer (born 1998)

Personal information
- Full name: Sibiri Arnaud Sanou
- Date of birth: 5 June 1998 (age 28) (Note: Some sources claim Sanou's date of birth is 5 September 1998.)
- Place of birth: Bobo-Dioulasso, Burkina Faso
- Height: 1.70 m (5 ft 7 in)
- Position: Midfielder

Team information
- Current team: ZESCO United

Senior career*
Years	Team	Apps	(Gls)
2015–2019	ASF Bobo Dioulasso		
2019–2021	Coton Sport		
2021–2023	Al-Naft		
2023–2024	Requins de l'Atlantique		
2025–	ZESCO United		

International career
2016–2021	Burkina Faso	3	(0)
- * Club domestic league appearances and goals

Sibiri Arnaud Sanou (born 5 June 1998) is a Burkinabé professional footballer who plays as a midfielder for Zambia Super League club ZESCO United.

== Club career ==
Sanou began his career at ASF Bobo Dioulasso, a club in his hometown of Bobo-Dioulasso. He signed for Coton Sport in 2019. Sanou scored three goals and provided two assists in fifteen matches in the 2020–21 CAF Confederation Cup.

In March 2025, Sanou signed for Zambian club ZESCO United.

== International career ==
Sanou made his debut for the Burkina Faso national team in a 1–0 friendly loss to Uzbekistan on 24 August 2016. After four years with no appearances, he made his return to play for the national team in 2021.

== Honours ==
ASF Bobo Dioulasso

- Burkinabé Premier League: 2017–18

Coton Sport

- Elite One: 2020–21
