= Zakaria Boulahia =

Algerian footballer (born 1997)

Personal information
- Full name: Mohamed Zakaria Boulahia
- Date of birth: 1 June 1997 (age 29)
- Place of birth: Aïn Témouchent, Algeria
- Height: 1.77 m (5 ft 10 in)
- Position: Winger

Team information
- Current team: Siracusa
- Number: 19

Youth career
- Huracán Valencia
- Atlético Madrid

Senior career*
Years	Team	Apps	(Gls)
2015–2017	Atlético Madrid B	37	(18)
2017	Atlético Madrid	0	(0)
2018	Atlético Levante	13	(1)
2018	Real Murcia	2	(0)
2019–2020	Atlético Albacete	30	(3)
2020–2021	JS Kabylie	23	(3)
2021–2023	Emirates	13	(2)
2023	MC El Bayadh	6	(0)
2024	San Roque de Lepe	14	(2)
2025–2026	Paternò	14	(3)
2026	Acireale	8	(1)
2026–	Siracusa	0	(0)
- * Club domestic league appearances and goals as of 26 September 2026

Mohamed Zakaria Boulahia (Arabic: محمد زكريا بولحية; born 1 June 1997), sometimes known as just Zaka, is an Algerian professional footballer who plays as a winger for Siracusa. He also holds Spanish citizenship.

== Career ==
As a youth player, Boulahia joined the youth academy of Atlético Madrid, one of Spain's most successful clubs from the youth academy of Huracán Valencia in the Spanish third division.

He started his career with the reserves of Atlético Madrid, helping them achieve promotion from the Spanish fourth division to the third division.

In 2018, Zaka signed for Real Murcia in the Spanish third division.

Before the second half of 2018/19, he signed for Spanish fourth division side Atlético Albacete.

In 2020, he signed for JS Kabylie in Algeria.

In 2021, he signed for Emirates Club in UAE. In 2023, he joined MC El Bayadh.
