= Augustine Oladapo =

Nigerian footballer

Personal information
- Full name: Augustine Tunde Oladapo
- Date of birth: 27 July 1995 (age 31)
- Height: 1.75 m (5 ft 9 in)
- Position: Midfielder

Senior career*
Years	Team	Apps	(Gls)
2015	Ifeanyi Ubah		
2016	Kwara United		
2017	Gombe United		
2018–2022	Enyimba		
2022–2024	TP Mazembe		
2024–2025	ES Sétif	26	(0)
2025–2026	Al-Wehda	15	(0)

International career^{‡}
2018–	Nigeria	5	(0)
- * Club domestic league appearances and goals as of 1:13, 17 January 2023 (UTC) ‡ National team caps and goals as of 16:34, 25 February 2018 (UTC)

Augustine Tunde Oladapo (born 27 July 1995) is a Nigerian professional footballer who plays as a midfielder.

== Career ==
He has played club football for Ifeanyi Ubah, Kwara United, Gombe United and Enyimba. He signed for TP Mazembe in August 2022.

On 5 August 2025, Oladapo joined Al Wehda.

He made his international debut for Nigeria in 2018.
