= Sudden cardiac death of athletes =

Natural, unexpected death from cardiac arrest of athletes

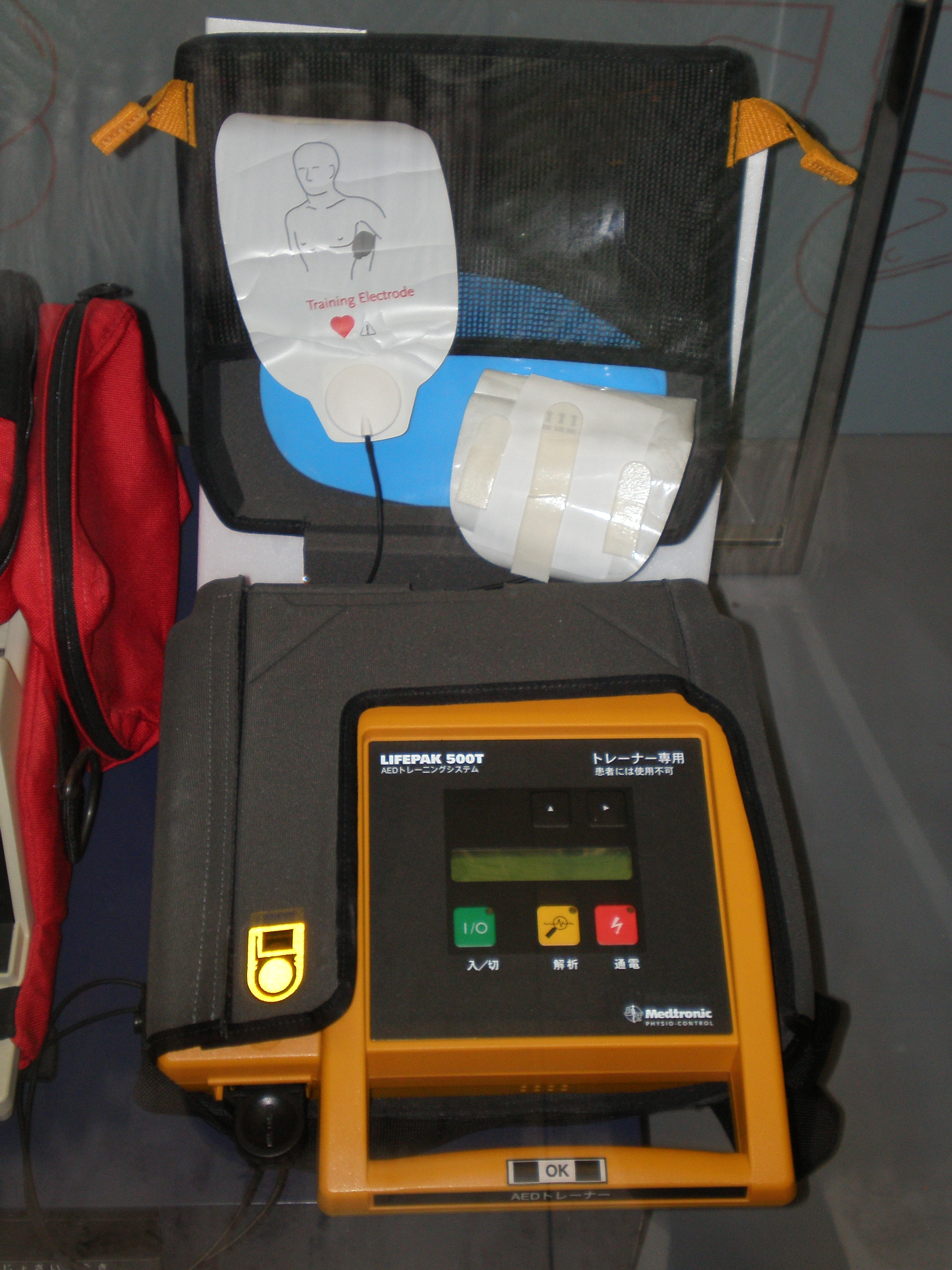
Defibrillator training kit

The sudden cardiac death of athletes is typically defined as natural, unexpected death from cardiac arrest within one hour of the onset of collapse symptoms, excluding additional time on mechanical life support. (Wider definitions of sudden death are also in use, but not usually applied to the athletic situation.) Most causes relate to congenital or acquired cardiovascular disease with no symptoms noted before the fatal event.

The prevalence of any single, associated condition is low, with the most common affecting nearly 0.5% of the general population, and the sensitivity and specificity of common screening tests leave much to be desired. The single most important predictor is fainting or near-fainting during exercise, which should require detailed explanation and investigation.

The victims include many well-known names, especially in professional association football, and close relatives are often at risk for similar cardiac problems.

== Causes ==
The sudden cardiac deaths of 387 young American athletes (under age 35) were analyzed in a 2003 medical review:

Cause	Incidence	
Hypertrophic cardiomyopathy	26%	Genetically determined
Commotio cordis	20%	Structurally normal heart, disrupted electrically by a blow to the chest
Coronary artery anomalies	14%	Exact mechanisms unknown; some association with other congenital CVS abnormalities
Left ventricular hypertrophy of undetermined origin	7%	Probable variant of hypertrophic cardiomyopathy
Myocarditis	5%	Acute inflammation
Ruptured aortic aneurysm (Marfan syndrome)	3%	Genetically determined; also associated with unusual height
Arrhythmogenic right ventricular cardiomyopathy	3%	Genetically determined
Tunneled coronary artery	3%	Congenital abnormality
Aortic valve stenosis	3%	Multiple causes
Atherosclerotic coronary artery disease	3%	Mainly acquired; dominant cause in older adults
Other diagnosis	13%	

While most causes of sudden cardiac death relate to congenital or acquired cardiovascular disease, an exception is commotio cordis, in which the heart is structurally normal but a potentially fatal loss of rhythm occurs because of the accident of timing of a blow to the chest. Its fatality rate is about 65% even with prompt CPR and defibrillation, and more than 80% without.

=== Before age 35 ===
Age 35 serves as an approximate borderline for the likely cause of sudden cardiac death. Before age 35, congenital abnormalities of the heart and blood vessels predominate. These are usually asymptomatic prior to the fatal event, although not invariably so. Congenital cardiovascular deaths are reported to occur disproportionately in African-American athletes.

=== After age 35 ===
After age 35, acquired coronary artery disease predominates (80%), and this is true regardless of the athlete's former level of fitness.

Various performance-enhancing drugs can increase cardiac risk, though evidence has been inconclusive about their involvement in sudden cardiac deaths.

== Genetics ==
=== Cardiomyopathies ===
Cardiomyopathies are generally inherited as autosomal dominants, although recessive forms have been described, and dilated cardiomyopathy can also be inherited in an X-linked pattern. Consequently, in addition to tragedy involving an athlete who succumbs, there are medical implications for close relatives. Among family members of index cases, more than 300 causative mutations have been identified. However, not all mutations have the same potential for severe outcomes, and there is not yet a clear understanding of how these mutations (which affect the same myosin protein molecule) can lead to the dramatically different clinical characteristics and outcomes associated with hypertrophic cardiomyopathy (HCM) and dilated cardiomyopathy (DCM).

Since HCM, as an example, is typically an autosomal dominant trait, each child of an HCM parent has a 50% chance of inheriting the mutation. In individuals without a family history, also known as sporadic cases, a common cause of the disease may be a "de novo" mutation of the gene that produces the β-myosin heavy chain, with two out of seven tested patients falling into this category.

=== Channelopathies ===
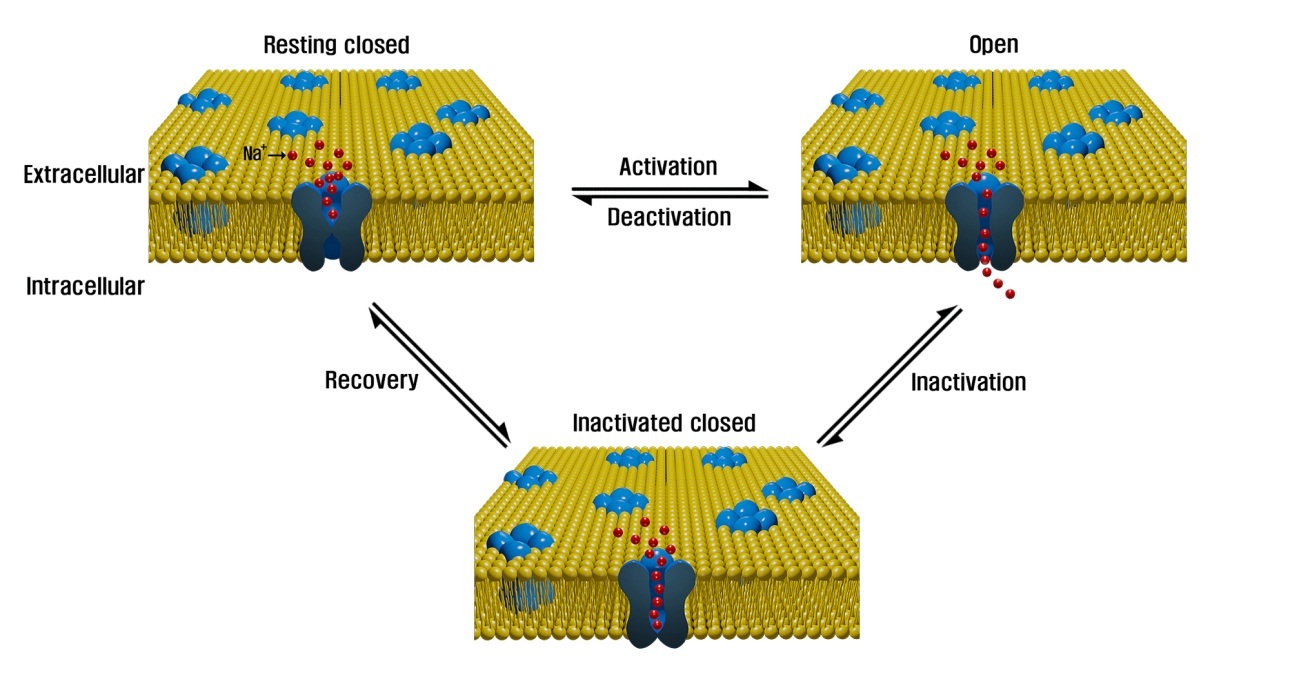
Sodium channel, implicated in ion channelopathies including Brugada syndrome, Long QT syndrome, Dravet syndrome, Paramyotonia congenita

Sudden cardiac death can usually be attributed to cardiovascular disease or commotio cordis, but about 20% of cases show no obvious cause and remain undiagnosed after autopsy. Interest in these "autopsy-negative" deaths has centered around the "ion channelopathies". These electrolyte channels are pores regulating the movement of sodium, potassium and calcium ions into cardiac cells, collectively responsible for creating and controlling the electrical signals that govern the heart's rhythm. Abnormalities in this system occur in relatively rare genetic diseases such as Long QT syndrome, Brugada syndrome, and Catecholaminergic polymorphic ventricular tachycardia, all associated with sudden death. Consequently, autopsy-negative sudden cardiac deaths (no physical abnormalities identified) may comprise a larger part of the channelopathies than previously anticipated.

=== Heritable connective tissue diseases ===
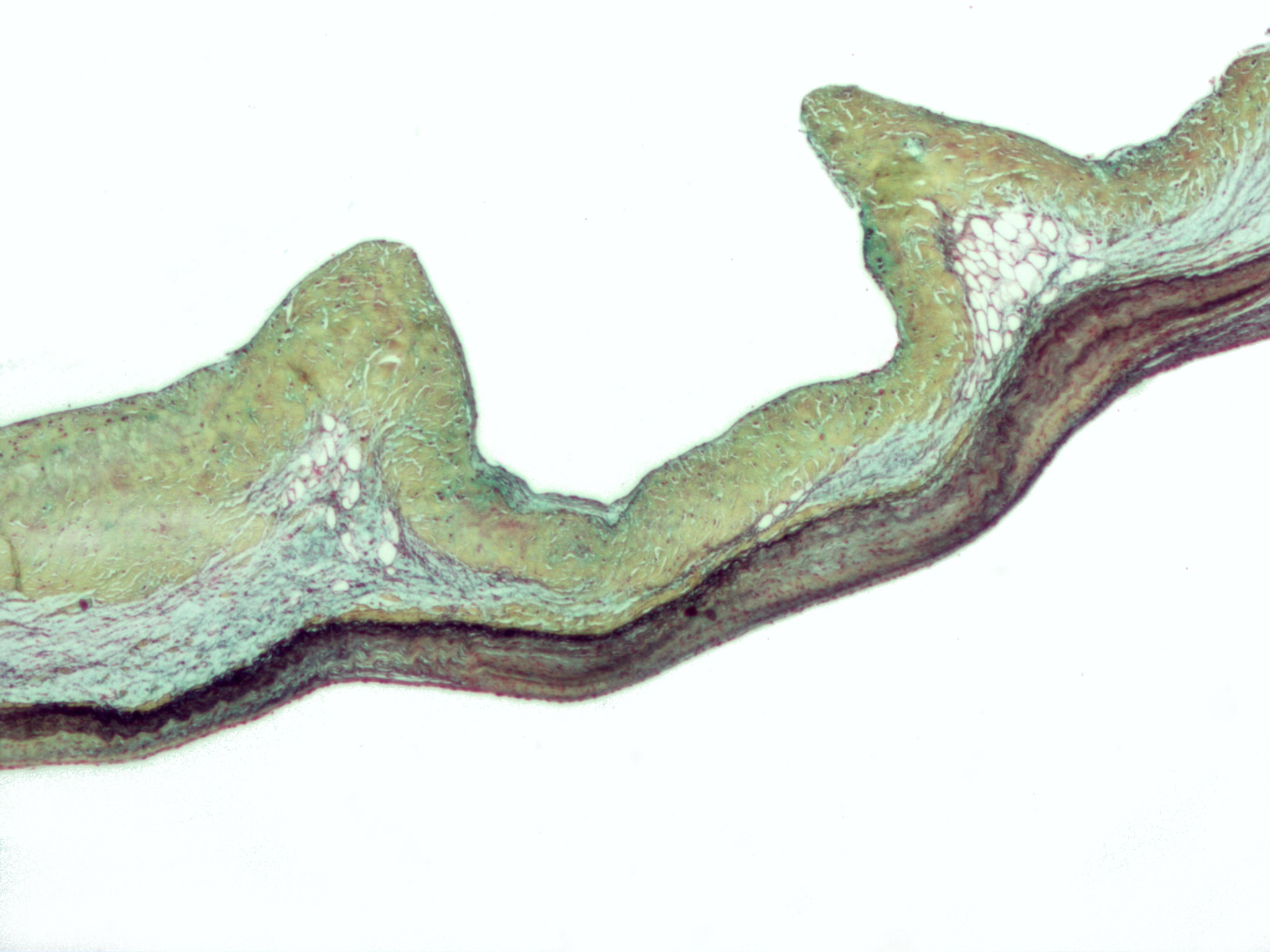
Myxomatous degeneration of the aortic valve, common in Marfan syndrome

Heritable connective tissue diseases are rare, each disorder estimated at one to ten per 100,000, of which Marfan syndrome is the most common. It is carried by the FBN1 gene on chromosome 15, which encodes the connective protein fibrillin-1, inherited as a dominant trait. This protein is essential for synthesis and maintenance of elastic fibers. Since these fibers are particularly abundant in the aorta, ligaments, and the ciliary zonules of the eye, these areas are among the worst affected. Everyone has a pair of FBN1 genes and, because transmission is dominant, those who have inherited one affected FBN1 gene from either parent will have Marfan syndrome. Although it is most frequently inherited as an autosomal dominant, there is no family history in 25% of cases.

Recruiting practices aimed at attracting athletes who are unusually tall or who have an unusually wide arm span (characteristics of Marfan syndrome) can increase the prevalence of the syndrome within sports such as basketball and volleyball.

=== DNA testing ===
After a disease-causing mutation has been identified in an index case (which is not always accomplished conclusively), the main task is genetic identification of carriers within a pedigree, a sequential process known as "cascade testing". Family members with the same mutation may show different severities of disease, a phenomenon known as "variable penetrance". As a result, some may remain asymptomatic, with little lifelong evidence of disease. Nevertheless, their children remain at risk of inheriting the disorder and potentially being more severely affected.

== Screening ==
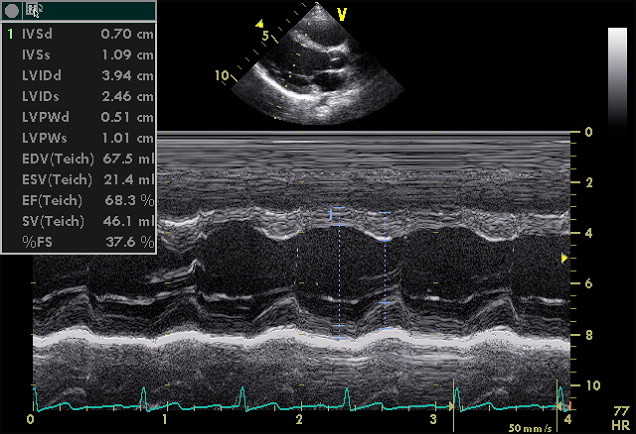
Echocardiogram showing left ventricle

Screening athletes for cardiac disease can be problematic because of low prevalence and inconclusive performance of various tests that have been used. Nevertheless, sudden death among seemingly healthy individuals attracts much public and legislator attention because of its visible and tragic nature.

As an example, the Texas Legislature appropriated US$1 million for a pilot study of statewide athlete screening in 2007. The study employed a combination of questionnaire, examination and electrocardiography for 2,506 student athletes, followed by echocardiography for 2,051 of them, including any students with abnormal findings from the first three steps. The questionnaire alone flagged 35% of the students as potentially at risk, but there were many false positive results, with actual disease being confirmed in less than 2%. Further, a substantial number of screen-positive students declined repeated recommendations for follow-up evaluation. (Individuals who are conclusively diagnosed with cardiac disease are usually told to avoid competitive sports.) It should be stressed that this was a single pilot program, but it was indicative of the problems associated with large-scale screening, and consistent with experience in other locations with low prevalence of sudden death in athletes.

== Incidence ==
Sudden cardiac death occurs in approximately one per 200,000 young athletes per year, usually triggered during competition or practice. The victim is usually male and associated with association football, basketball, ice hockey, or American football, reflecting the large number of athletes participating in these sustained and strenuous sports. For a normally healthy age group, the risk appears to be particularly magnified in competitive basketball, with sudden cardiac death rates as high as one per 3,000 annually for male basketball players in NCAA Division I. This is still far below the rate for the general population, estimated as one per 1,300–1,600 and dominated by the elderly. However, a population as large as the United States will experience the sudden cardiac death of a competitive athlete at the average rate of one every three days, often with significant local media coverage heightening public attention.

In the United States approximately 8 to 10 deaths per year can be attributed to sudden cardiac death in NCAA with overall rate of 1 per 43,000.

== Notable cases ==
These athletes, with notable careers, experienced sudden cardiac death by age 40.

- Mohamed Abdelwahab, 22 (2006), football
- Gaines Adams, 26 (2010), American football
- Jaouad Akaddar, 28 (2012), football
- Davide Astori, 31 (2018), football
- Víctor Hugo Ávalos, 37 (2009), football
- Heath Benedict, 24 (2008), American football
- Hédi Berkhissa, 24 (1997), football
- Pedro Berruezo, 27 (1973), football
- Viktor Blinov, 22 (1968), ice hockey
- Gilbert Bulawan, 29 (2016), basketball
- J. V. Cain, 28 (1979), American football
- Sékou Camara, 27 (2013), football
- Quévin Castro, 25 (2026), football
- Alexei Cherepanov, 19 (2008), ice hockey
- Mitchell Cole, 27 (2012), football
- Jason Collier, 28 (2005), basketball
- Hugo Cunha, 28 (2005), football
- Renato Curi, 24 (1977), football
- Alexander Dale Oen, 26 (2012), swimming
- Frankie de la Cruz, 37 (2021), baseball
- Shane del Rosario, 30 (2013), MMA
- Ben Idrissa Dermé, 34 (2016), football
- Lyle Downs, 24 (1921), Australian football
- Raphael Dwamena, 28 (2023), football
- Patrick Ekeng, 26 (2016), football
- Bobsam Elejiko, 30 (2011), football
- Derrick Faison, 36 (2004), American football
- Sebastian Faisst, 20 (2009), handball
- Miklós Fehér, 24 (2004), football
- Neil Fingleton, 36 (2017), basketball
- Marc-Vivien Foé, 28 (2003), football
- Matt Gadsby, 27 (2006), football
- Hank Gathers, 23 (1990), basketball
- Cristian Gómez, 27 (2015), football
- Michael Goolaerts, 23 (2018), cycling
- Larry Gordon, 28 (1983), American football
- Herb Gorman, 28 (1953), baseball
- Rasmus Green, 26 (2006), football
- Sergei Grinkov, 28 (1995), figure skating
- Eddie Guerrero, 38 (2005), wrestling
- Frank Hayes, 22 (1923), horse racing
- Thomas Herrion, 23 (2005), American football
- Cătălin Hîldan, 24 (2000), football
- Dixie Howell, 40 (1960), baseball
- Chuck Hughes, 28 (1971), American football
- Flo Hyman, 31 (1986), volleyball
- Endurance Idahor, 25 (2010), football
- Robbie James, 40 (1998), football
- Daniel Jarque, 26 (2009), football
- Jacoby Jones, 40 (2024), American football
- Cristiano Júnior, 25 (2004), football
- Joe Kennedy, 28 (2007), baseball
- Darryl Kile, 33 (2002), baseball
- John Kirkby, 23 (1953), football
- Michael Klein, 33 (1993), football
- György Kolonics, 36 (2008), canoeing
- Wayne Larkin, 29 (1968), ice hockey
- Rauli Levonen, 28 (1981), ice hockey
- Reggie Lewis, 27 (1993), basketball
- José Lima, 37 (2010), baseball
- David Longhurst, 25 (1990), football
- Nikola Mantov, 23 (1973), football
- Pete Maravich, 40 (1988), basketball
- Alex Marques, 20 (2013), football
- Jesse Marunde, 27 (2007), weightlifting
- Scott Mason, 28 (2005), cricket
- Naoki Matsuda, 34 (2011), football
- Stan Mauldin, 27 (1948), American football
- Cormac McAnallen, 24 (2004), Gaelic football
- Conrad McRae, 29 (2000), basketball
- Fab Melo, 26 (2017), basketball
- Nilton Pereira Mendes, 30 (2006), football
- Igor Misko, 23 (2010), ice hockey
- Stéphane Morin, 29 (1998), ice hockey
- Piermario Morosini, 25 (2012), football
- Carl Morton, 39 (1983), baseball
- Allan Nascimento, 34 (2026), MMA
- Damien Nash, 24 (2007), American football
- Frederiek Nolf, 21 (2009), cycling
- Chaswe Nsofwa, 28 (2007), football
- Gábor Ocskay, 33 (2009), ice hockey
- Phil O'Donnell, 35 (2007), football
- Samuel Okwaraji, 25 (1989), football
- David Oniya, 30 (2015), football
- Alen Pamić, 23 (2013), football
- Pavão, 26 (1973), football
- Bruno Pezzey, 39 (1994), football
- Antonio Puerta, 22 (2007), football
- Petar Radaković, 29 (1966), football
- Mickey Renaud, 19 (2008), ice hockey
- Bernardo Ribeiro, 26 (2016), football
- Darcy Robinson, 26 (2007), ice hockey
- Brad Rone, 34 (2003), boxing
- Omar Sahnoun, 24 (1980), football
- Matija Sarkic, 26 (2024), football
- Serginho, 30 (2004), football
- Ryan Shay, 28 (2007), marathon
- Dave Sparks, 26 (1954), American football
- Marvin Stone, 26 (2008), basketball
- Cheick Tioté, 30 (2017), football
- Robert Traylor, 34 (2011), basketball
- Zeke Upshaw, 26 (2018), basketball
- Luciano Vendemini, 24 (1977), basketball
- Ginty Vrede, 22 (2008), kickboxing
- Frank Warfield, 35 (1932), baseball
- Chandler Williams, 27 (2013), American football
- David "Soldier" Wilson, 23 (1906), football
- Sergejs Žoltoks, 31 (2004), ice hockey

== See also ==
- Cardiac Risk in the Young (UK charity)
- Lists of sportspeople who died during their careers
- List of marathon fatalities
- List of premature professional wrestling deaths
