= List of association footballers who died after on-field incidents =

This is a list of association footballers who died due to football-related incidents.

The primary causes of on-field deaths have evolved over time. Improvements in infection control and emergency surgery since the early days of organised soccer have mostly eliminated the fatal complications that were once common after routine sporting injuries. Squad rotation and substitutes have also reduced the need for seriously ill players to start, or remain in, games, and lifestyle factors are now tightly controlled.

However, sudden cardiac deaths have increased as the intense pace of the modern game has placed higher demands on players' aerobic conditioning. Following an increase in heart-related deaths, both during matches and training, in 2007 the International Federation of Association Football (FIFA) considered mandatory cardiac testing, already in place for years in some countries, such as Italy. By 2009, FIFA pre-competition medical assessment included family history, heart rhythm, sounds, and electrocardiogram results. The Union of European Football Associations (UEFA) required extensive medical tests, including electrocardiogram and echocardiogram for players in the Europa League 2011–12. Constant monitoring has been advised.

The FIFA Sudden Death Report (FIFA-SDR) was carried out by Saarland University and published in 2020. The report recorded worldwide deaths attributed to sudden cardiac arrest or other unexplained sudden death while playing (or shortly after playing) football from 2014 to 2018. There were 617 cases during the five-year period. In the majority of cases where an autopsy was carried out, the cause of death was coronary heart disease.

Most non-cardiac deaths are the result of blunt trauma to the head or torso, resulting in life-threatening conditions such as intracerebral hemorrhage and peritonitis, caused by colliding with other players, goalposts or stadium architecture. Challenging another player by targeting their body, an important part of soccer for most of the 20th century, is penalised automatically under modern refereeing guidelines, as is "dangerous play" such as playing the ball with a foot above shoulder height. The death of Billy Vigar in 2025, from a collision with a concrete perimeter wall at a non-league ground in London, prompted an English FA review of pitch perimeters at "more than 900" clubs, resulting in an update to the English ground grading criteria to ban "solid brick, breeze block or concrete barriers around pitches".

As with other forms of outdoor recreation, fatal lightning strikes are a rare but persistent problem, especially at training grounds where there is no stadium structure to draw the lightning away.

== List ==
The list includes players who died either during matches or training, or as the result of incidents during matches or training for various reasons, such as injuries, cardiac arrest, natural death, and sometimes for unknown reasons. Death may occur immediately or several days after the injury or fall, but is still directly attributable to football-related activities.

It does not include players who suffered cardiac "death" on the pitch but were successfully resuscitated and survived, such as Fabrice Muamba and Christian Eriksen.

=== Pre-1900 ===
Date	Name	Age	Team	Notes
22 August 1874	Robert Atherley (SCO) [ cs ]	19	(Scotland) Star of Leven	Died of a ruptured stomach, after receiving a kick in a match against the Lily club of Renton.
8 December 1877	Henry Smith (ENG)	23	(England) Preston Rovers	During a match against Blackburn Rovers at the latter's Pleasington Cricket Ground, Smith, playing on the right wing, collapsed while running after the ball. Was taken into the Butler's Arms (where the players had their facilities) but expired almost immediately afterwards. An inquest found he had died of natural causes.
25 December 1877	George Beamont (ENG)	23	(England) Owlerton	In a friendly against St Philip's in Sheffield, a clearance sent the ball over a stone fence running alongside Dark Lane. Beaumont jumped onto the fence to retrieve the ball, but some stones gave way, causing Beaumont to fall 60 feet to his death into a quarry below.
19 January 1878	George Cornish (WAL)	18	(Wales) Newtown	Died of a cold contracted in a match against Wrexham.
25 October 1879	Harry Rogers (ENG)	25	(England) Reading	Captain of the Reading side which faced Pilgrims at the Reading Cricket Ground. 15 minutes into the game, Rogers called for medical help, stating that he felt "bilious"; while someone was fetching brandy for him, he intercepted an attack, praised goalkeeper George Fuller for a save, lay down in the area, convulsed, and died. His death was put down to an epileptic fit.
28 August 1883	James Gordon (SCO)	23	(Scotland) Arbroath	Gordon, playing in goal for Arbroath against South Western of Glasgow on 25 August, took an accidental kick to the stomach late in the game. He died of a rupture of the liver three days later.
28 May 1885	Charles Bache (ENG)	23	(England) Birmingham Southfield	Took a knee to the thigh in a match against Aston Trafalgar at Bournbrook. The day after he sought medical assistance, but the doctors found nothing wrong; four days later, he was admitted to hospital with acute blood poisoning, and died. An inquest found the blood poisoning was a result of his footballing injury and returned a verdict of accidental death.
11 October 1885	Thomas Anderson (SCO)	20	(Scotland) Dalmuir Thistle	Kneed in the abdomen by M'Aulay of Glen Rangers during a friendly match on 10 October 1885. Medical treatment was not instantly applied in the belief that Anderson was exaggerating his injury. He died "in great agony" at 4 pm the next day.
29 July 1886	Alfred Turner (ENG)	23	(England) Farnworth Standard	On 28 July 1886, playing for Standard in a friendly at Little Hulton F.C., Turner injured himself when charging at Samuel Blakeley of the home side; Turner died the next night of internal injuries. Before dying, Turner made a statement exonerating Blakeley of all blame.
13 November 1886	Daniel Houghney (SCO) (Note: Name also rendered Haughney)	27	(Scotland) Mearns Athletic	Kneed in the stomach by Hattrick of Howwood during a Renfrewshire Cup tie on 12 November 1886, and died of the injury the next day.
21 November 1886	William Colsey (ENG)	20	(England) Kidderminster Harriers	Took an accidental kick to the stomach in a match at Langley Green Victoria on 20 November, and died of an abdominal injury the next day. An inquest jury returned a verdict of accidental death.
1 October 1887	Joseph Dean (ENG)	19	(England) Barrow (Manchester)	During a home match with Peel Bank Rovers, Dean took an accidental kick to the stomach from a team-mate, and was carried off in great agony; he died the next day of the effects of a ruptured bowel.
1 January 1888	James Harkins (ENG)	32	(England) Heaton Park	Injured in a match against Darwen Old Wanderers on 22 October 1887 when an opponent's knee struck his thigh; the injury turned into an abscess which caused his death two months later.
13 January 1889	William Cropper (ENG)	26	(England) Staveley	Ruptured bowel in a match against Grimsby Town led to his death the next day.
26 February 1889	Robert Whyte (SCO)	23	(Scotland) Redding Athletic	Abdominal injury from a kick to the stomach in a friendly against Southfield of Slamannan led to his death three days later.
9 September 1889	Thomas Spittle (ENG)	20	(England) Packington	Suffered a blow to the stomach in a match for Packington at Fentham Road against Small Heath reserves on 7 September 1889, when he collided with Richard Hall as both men went for a 50/50 ball. Despite no external sign of injury, Spittle was struck with continual vomiting, and was removed to hospital, where he died on the Monday morning. An inquest returned a verdict of accidental death as no foul had been committed.
5 March 1890	Jack Keys (ENG)	24	(England) Everton Athletic	Received an injury during a home match against Wigan Central on 22 February 1890; it exacerbated an existing illness, and it caused his death at his mother's home two weeks later.
11 January 1892	James Dunlop (SCO)	21	(Scotland) St Mirren	Tetanus from fall on piece of glass in a friendly game against Abercorn led to his death ten days later.
9 October 1892	William Wallace (SCO)	23	(Scotland) Culter	On 8 October 1892, playing in a friendly against Victoria Rangers of Aberdeen, Wallace collided with an opposing player and fell awkwardly on his knee; he shrugged off the collision and briefly played on, before leaving the pitch and walking home. His condition deteriorated overnight and he died the next morning. Wallace, a paper-maker, was survived by his widow and child.
12 November 1893	John Henry Morris (ENG)	26	(England) Shrewsbury Town	Internal hemorrhage following a bad tackle in a bad tempered match. A verdict of accidental death was returned.
23 November 1893	Walter Bannister (ENG)	24	(England) Chesterfield Town	Rupture of the kidney from a tackle in game against Derby Junction; he died almost three weeks later.
28 March 1894	Teddy Smith (ENG)	27	(England) Bedminster	Suffered severe concussion following a clash of heads in the Gloucestershire Cup semi-final against Eastville Rovers. He continued playing initially, but was eventually forced to leave the game and died from his injury the next morning.
16 February 1895	William Henworth (ENG)	23	(England) Astley Bridge Wanderers	Injured playing as half-back for Astley Bridge Wanderers in a match against Cox Green on 9 February. He returned to work as a piecer in a cotton mill, but his injury grew worse, and on 16 February he died, the cause of death being put down to "periostitis or exhaustion".
25 May 1896	James Logan (SCO)	25	(England) Loughborough	Pneumonia while playing.
29 November 1896	Joe Powell (ENG)	25	(England) Woolwich Arsenal	Blood poisoning and tetanus after breaking his arm in game against Kettering Town.
20 November 1897	John Fisher (ENG)	19	(England) Workington	Fisher was part of the Workington team which had won the Cumberland Senior Cup by beating Carlisle City 4–2 in Carlisle on 27 March 1897. As the trophy was being presented, Carlisle supporters threw stones at the Workington side, one of which struck Fisher on the temple, and rendered him bedridden. He died of his injuries 8 months later and a verdict of manslaughter was returned.

=== 1900–1949 ===
Date	Name	Age	Team	Notes
January 1900	James Collins (ENG)	27 or 28	(England) Chatham	Tetanus caused by on-field injury after being cut by piece of flint.
6 December 1901	D. Menzies Emery (SCO)	18	(Scotland) Scone	Died of pneumonia contracted in a match the previous week against Perth Black Watch
27 August 1902	Di Jones (WAL)	35	Manchester City (ENG)	Gashed knee turned septic leading to death.
27 October 1906	Soldier Wilson (SCO)	23	(England) Leeds City	Heart attack while playing against Burnley, probably from heavy smoking. He attempted to return to the field of play even when in great pain.
8 April 1907	Tommy Blackstock (SCO)	25	Manchester United (ENG)	Collapsed after heading a ball in a game against St Helens Town and died.
29 December 1909	James Main (SCO)	23	(Scotland) Hibernian	Sustained stomach injuries after colliding with a Partick Thistle player during a Christmas Day match at Firhill on a frostbound pitch and died four days later.
30 March 1911	Frederick Lindsay (ENG)	19	(England) Loftus Albion	On 25 March 1911, 20 minutes into a game against Lingdale Mines, Albions right half Frederick Lindsay suffered a broken leg, after Richard Stockdale blocked an attempt at a pass. Dirt entered the wound, and Lindsay died of tetanus on the following Thursday; a jury returned a verdict of accidental death. Lindsay's last words were reported to be to ask his family to forgive Stockdale.
19 February 1916	Bob Benson (ENG)	33	(England) Arsenal	Burst blood vessel following a wartime game against Reading.
30 May 1919	Roberto Chery (URU)	23	Uruguay / Peñarol	Died while playing for Uruguay against Chile in the 1919 South American Championship during his debut (and subsequently his only game) with the national team after coach Severino Castillo decided he would replace Cayetano Saporiti. Although he suffered severe pain after making a save during the match, Chery was not replaced and continued playing. 13 days after the injury, Chery was operated at Casa da Saúde in Brazil but he did not survive the surgery and died. A tournament in honor of the athlete was held between Brazil and Argentina. Brazil played wearing Peñarol's uniforms while Argentina wore a shirt similar to Uruguay national team.
7 January 1921	Horace Fairhurst (ENG)	27	(England) Blackpool	Head injury in a league game at Barnsley in December 1920; died as a result of his injury early in the new year.
14 November 1921	Joshua Wilkinson (SCO)	24	(Scotland) Dumbarton	Goalkeeper who died from peritonitis two days after a game against Rangers.
6 August 1922	Jacobo Urso (ARG)	23	(Argentina) San Lorenzo de Almagro	He broke two ribs when he collided with another player. The fragments punctured a kidney. He refused to be replaced and played the rest of the match until he fainted. He died a week later.
14 September 1922	Jock Hutchinson (SCO)	24	(England) Whitby Whitehall	While playing for Whitby Whitehall against Loftus Albion on 13 September, he headed away a shot, and just missed heading away a follow-up shot; he remarked "I would have got that one but the other one stunned me", and collapsed. He died in the early hours of the following morning in hospital of a brain haemorrhage.
11 November 1923	Tom Butler (ENG)		(England) Port Vale	Died from tetanus eight days after fracturing his arm in a match.
13 March 1927	Jean Le Bidois (FRA)	26	(France) Stade Olympique de l'Est	During a season-ending match of the Ligue Île-de-France, the goalkeeper received a violent kick at his carotid from Aron Pollitz of US Suisse Paris, from which he succumbed in the locker room. Upon the announcement of his death, the game was called off.
4 April 1927	Albert Van Coile (BEL)	27	(Belgium) Cercle Brugge	Died from Perforated bowel after a collision with an opponent a day before.
30 April 1927	Sam Wynne (ENG)	30	(England) Bury	Collapsed and died on the field of pneumonia during a match against Sheffield United, although Bury claimed it was a cerebral haemorrhage.
3 May 1927	David Arellano (CHI)	24	(Chile) Colo-Colo	Peritonitis after being hit by an opposing player during the match. Shortly after the incident he was brought to a nearby clinic where he ultimately died.
5 September 1931	John Thomson (SCO)	22	(Scotland) Celtic	Injured during an Old Firm match when he dived for the ball and suffered a fractured skull in an accidental collision with Rangers' Sam English. He died that evening.
25 December 1932	Robert Halliday (SCO)	20	(Scotland) Jed Arts	Goalkeeper playing his first match of the season (against Chirnside United) who suffered a kick in the kidneys late in the game. Died in Edinburgh Royal Infirmary following an operation the day after the accident.
17 June 1933	Jón Kristbjörnsson (ISL)	22	(Iceland) Valur	Goalkeeper who collided with a striker from KR Reykjavik and suffered a head injury in the last game of the Icelandic League on 13 June 1933. Was taken to hospital, where he died from his injuries four days later.
1 December 1934	Sim Raleigh (ENG)	25	(England) Gillingham	Died after a clash of heads with Brighton & Hove Albion's Paul Mooney in a game, who subsequently retired.
3 December 1934	Pfeiferlik (TCH)		(Czechoslovakia) Union Žižkov	Fell and suffered a concussion in a game against Viktoria Žižkov. Died on the way to hospital.
10 February 1935	Samuel Beattie (IRL)	28	(Republic of Ireland) Distillery F.C.	Died after a clash of heads after a corner in the 1934–35 FAI Cup quarter-final against Dundalk. Finished the game and went home. Became delirious the same night and was rushed to hospital due to cerebral haemorrhage. An inquest returned a verdict of accidental death, with a rider specifically exculpating the other player involved.
5 February 1936	Jimmy Thorpe (ENG)	22	(England) Sunderland	When playing as goalkeeper, Thorpe, a diabetic, collapsed into a coma from which he never recovered, attributed to the rough treatment he received on the pitch in a game against Chelsea. His death led to the rule that players were no longer able to kick the ball out of the goalkeeper's arms.
12 November 1936	Jorge Chávez Boza (PER)		(Peru) Atlético Chalaco	Playing in a friendly match for Atlético Chalaco, he had his femoral artery injured by Víctor Guarderas Lavalle from Alianza Lima. His limb was amputated which later led to his death since having diabetes.
17 August 1937	James Keenan (SCO)	38	(Scotland) Duns F.C.	Goalkeeper who collapsed with a heart attack during an Edinburgh City cup tie with Leith Athletic F.C. at the Meadowbank ground in Edinburgh after straining for a high ball. Was taken by ambulance to the Royal Infirmary but had already died.
15 May 1941	Law Adam (NED) (Note: Also played for Switzerland)	32	(Netherlands) Thor	After retirement at the age of 24 due to heart problems in 1933, Adam was playing for Thor against Anasher in Surabaya in the Dutch East Indies, during which he suffered a heart attack which led to his death.
22 March 1946	Issac Angulo (PER)		(Peru) Alianza Lima	Collapsed during a friendly match against a saltpeter workers team in Antofagasta, Chile. He died from a possible cardiac arrest.
19 April 1948	Bertram Boardley (ENG)	18	(England) 121st Training Regiment	Struck by lightning during the Army Cup Final at Aldershot. Boardley had signed as a professional for Barrow before being called up.
19 April 1948	Kenneth Hill (ENG)	25	(England) Royal Armoured Corps	Struck by lightning during the Army Cup Final at Aldershot.
20 February 1949	Gustav Fähland (FRG)		(West Germany) TSV Braunschweig	Internal bleeding a few days after a collision with an opposing player in a match between his club TSV Braunschweig (a temporary name for Eintracht Braunschweig) and SV Werder Bremen on 13 February 1949.

=== 1950–1999 ===
Date	Name	Age	Team	Notes
August 1950	John Bickerstaffe (NIR)	22–23	(Northern Ireland) Glenavon	Collapsed during a trial match for Glenavon. Death ruled as accidental, and attributed to a broken neck.
1 April 1951	Mitotônio (BRA)	35	(Brazil) Ceará	Collapsed during a match. Death attributed to stomach congestion.
4 April 1953	John Kirkby (USA)	23	Wrexham (WAL)	Collapsed during a match. Death attributed to a cardiac arrest.
22 August 1954	Walter (BRA)	26	(Brazil) Portuguesa	Collapsed during a match shortly after being fouled by an opposing player. Death attributed to a stroke.
14 July 1963	Constantin Tabarcea (ROM)	26	(Romania) Petrolul Ploieşti	Collapsed during a match. Death attributed to unusual activity of the thymus gland.
1 November 1966	Petar Radaković (YUG)	29	(Socialist Federal Republic of Yugoslavia) NK Rijeka	Collapsed during a training session due to a heart ailment and died on the way to the hospital.
25 February 1967	Tony Allden (ENG)	23	(England) Highgate United	Seriously injured by a lightning strike on the pitch just in front of him during FA Amateur Cup quarter-final at home to Enfield, died the following day.
14 October 1968	Paul Shardlow (ENG)	25	(England) Stoke City	Died of a heart attack while on a training ground.
7 January 1973	Pedro Berruezo (SPA)	27	(Spain) Sevilla F.C.	Heart attack during a Segunda División match against Pontevedra. He had collapsed in previous matches against Alicante, Sabadell, and Barakaldo. He had received treatment for his condition, but collapsed for the last time at the Estadio Municipal de Pasarón, without ever regaining consciousness.
30 July 1973	Haukur Birgir Hauksson (ISL)	26	(Iceland) Ármann	Suffered serious internal injuries after colliding with an opponent during a game against Valur and died from them a month later.
17 September 1973	Vanderlei (BRA)	29	(Brazil) Operário-MS	Felt health-related problems while celebrating a goal in a match against Madureira, in Rio de Janeiro. He was taken to hospital but was pronounced dead.
16 December 1973	Pavão (POR)	26	(Portugal) F.C. Porto	Heart attack during a league game.
14 December 1975	Ángel Avilés (PER)		(Peru) Deportivo Junín	Collapsed on the field after a run with the ball, playing against Atlético Chalaco at the Estadio Nacional del Perú, he previously had heart complications since playing for Colegio Nacional Iquitos. A stadium in Moyobamba was named after him.
18 May 1977	Tony Aveyard (ENG)	21	(England) Scarborough	Head injuries received during a Northern Premier League match vs Boston United.
27 August 1977	Michel Soulier (BEL)	27	(Belgium) Namur	Suffered a heart attack during a Belgian Cup away match against Anderlecht at Parc Astrid, shortly after being hit by the ball in the chest. Stade Michel-Soulier in Namur was named in his honor.
30 October 1977	Renato Curi (ITA)	24	(Italy) Perugia	Heart attack while playing in a Serie A match against Juventus. Perugia's ground is named after him.
17 September 1978	Valtencir (BRA)	31	(Brazil) Colorado	Suffered a complete spinal cord rupture after taking a knee in the back, dying while still on the field, at the Willie Davids Stadium, Maringá.
21 April 1980	Omar Sahnoun (FRA)	24	(France) Bordeaux	Died from a heart attack during a club training.
5 November 1981	Hocine Benmiloudi (ALG)	26	(Algeria) CR Belouizdad	Died during a Ligue 1 match against USM Aïn Beïda in Stade 20 Août 1955 (Algiers), from severe food poisoning.
7 March 1982	Carlos Alberto Barbosa (BRA)	28	(Brazil) Sport	Died from infarction after fainting in a match against XV de Jaú.
23 September 1984	Erik Jongbloed (NED)	21	(Netherlands) DWS	Struck by lightning during an exhibition game. Son of Jan Jongbloed, goalkeeper of the Dutch national team in both the 1974 and 1978 FIFA World Cup Final.
18 November 1985	Colin Mathurin (ENG)	21	(England) Vauxhall Motors (Luton)	During an Isthmian League match against Stevenage Borough, Motors' forward Mathurin and Boro defender Dave Watkins clashed heads in trying to meet a cross; both players received treatment but both continued. Six minutes later, Mathurin collapsed, and was taken to hospital, where he was declared dead on arrival.
15 January 1987	José Antonio Gallardo (SPA)	25	(Spain) CD Málaga	Collided with an opponent on 21 December away to Celta de Vigo, underwent emergency surgery and returned home. Relapsed on 7 January with a cerebral haemorrhage and fell into an eight-day coma before dying.
23 August 1987	Paulo Navalho (POR)	20	Atlético Clube de Portugal	Acute myocardial infarction during a friendly match between Atletico and the UAE's Al-Jazira Club.
9 December 1987	Dursin Özbek (TUR)	17	(Turkey) Galatasaray	Died from a heart attack in a training match in Florya.
7 February 1989	Sixto Rovina (AHO)	27	Groningen (NED)	Collapsed at the moment he wanted to take a throw-in while playing against VV Hoogezand. He died of a heart attack.
12 August 1989	Samuel Okwaraji (NGR)	24	Nigeria	Collapsed and died while playing against Angola in a World Cup Qualifier. An autopsy showed that he had an enlarged heart and high blood pressure.
20 April 1990	Vágner Bacharel (BRA)	35	(Brazil) Paraná	Died on hospital, after a head trauma occurred in the game Paraná x SC Campo Mourão at the Campeonato Paranaense six days before, which resulted in a 180mm fracture of the left parieto-occipital bone of his skull, and later in severe cerebral edema.
8 September 1990	David Longhurst (ENG)	25	(England) York City	Suspected heart attack on the pitch while playing against Lincoln City. The cause of death was ruled to be cardiomyopathy at the later inquest. He was pronounced dead on arrival at the hospital.
2 February 1993	Michael Klein (ROM)	33	Bayer Uerdingen (GER)	Heart attack during a training session.
25 August 1995	Michael Goddard (NIR)		(Northern Ireland) Dundela	Died during a game against Dungannon Swifts at Stangmore Park after being struck in the chest by the ball.
29 October 1995	Amir Angwe (NGR)	29	(Nigeria) Julius Berger F.C.	Collapsed and died on the pitch of a heart attack.
4 January 1997	Hédi Berkhissa (TUN)	24	(Tunisia) Esperance Sportive de Tunis	Heart attack in a friendly game against Olympique Lyonnais at Stade Chedli Zouiten
4 April 1997	Waheeb Jabara (ISR)	23	(Israel) Hapoel Taibe	Heart attack while playing against Bnei Yehuda.
18 February 1998	Robbie James (WAL)	40	(Wales) Llanelli A.F.C.	Cardiomyopathy.
28 April 1998	Axel Jüptner (GER)	29	(Germany) Carl Zeiss Jena	Died suddenly of a heart attack during training.
24 July 1999	Ștefan Vrăbioru (ROM)	23	(Romania) Astra Ploieşti	Undetected heart defect that led to his collapse.

=== 2000–2009 ===
Date	Name	Age	Team	Notes
February 2000	John Ikoroma (NGR)	17	Al-Wahda S.C.C. (UAE)	Collapsed on the pitch and later died in hospital.
2 April 2000	Eri Irianto (INA)	26	(Indonesia) Persebaya Surabaya	Died in hospital due to heart failure after a match against PSIM Yogyakarta.
6 May 2000	Robert Mitwerandu (POL)	30	(Poland) Raków Częstochowa	Died from a heart attack in his bathroom, at the same night when his team lost 1–3 to Polar Wrocław.
21 May 2000	Hocine Gacemi (ALG)	24	(Algeria) JS Kabylie	Died in a hospital in Paris from a fractured skull after clash of heads suffered two days earlier
30 May 2000	Ivan Krstić (FRY)	19	(Federal Republic of Yugoslavia) Radnički Niš	Struck by lightning during a training session and killed instantly.
5 October 2000	Cătălin Hîldan (ROM)	24	(Romania) Dinamo București	Died during a friendly game against Olteniţa; in the 74th minute, Hîldan had a heart attack, and fell to the ground. The North Stand of Dinamo Stadium is named in his honour.
14 February 2001	Roman Pavelka (CZE)	33	(Czech Republic) SK Uničov	Collapsed during physical training and died from a heart condition.
29 August 2001	Serhiy Perkhun (UKR)	23	CSKA Moscow (RUS)	Injured in a collision with Budun Budunov who also sustained serious head trauma. He had a brain haemorrhage and died eight days later.
20 November 2001	Cédric Lestic (FRA)	26	(France) AS Cherbourg	Died during a training session at André-Picquenot Stadium in Tourlaville as a result of a heart attack.
20 February 2002	Cristian Neamțu (ROM)	21	(Romania) Universitatea Craiova	Accidentally struck in the mandible by a teammate charging towards goal. Internal bleeding was discovered, before he died one week later.
October 2002	Márcio dos Santos (BRA) (es)	28	Deportivo Wanka (PER)	Had a heart attack after a match against Alianza Lima.
24 October 2002	Hernán Gaviria (COL)	32	(Colombia) Deportivo Cali	Struck by lightning during a training session and killed instantly.
27 October 2002	Giovanni Córdoba (COL)	24	(Colombia) Deportivo Cali	Struck by the same lightning that killed Gaviria and died three days later from the injuries.
12 December 2002	Stefan Toleski (MKD)	23	(North Macedonia) FK Napredok	Collapsed during a match and later died in a hospital.
9 March 2003	Marvin Lee (TTO)	21	Trinidad and Tobago U20	Sustained neck and spinal injuries in a collision with Landon Donovan during the 2001 CONCACAF U-20 Tournament on 20 March 2001. Paralysed, he died two years later on 9 March 2003.
26 June 2003	Marc-Vivien Foé (CMR)	28	Cameroon	Collapsed while playing in the 2003 FIFA Confederations Cup semi-final against Colombia, and died shortly afterward in hospital. An autopsy later revealed the cause of death was hypertrophic cardiomyopathy.
25 January 2004	Miklós Fehér (HUN)	24	Benfica (POR)	Cardiac arrest caused by hypertrophic cardiomyopathy while playing against Vitória.
29 February 2004	Danny Ortiz (GUA)	27	(Guatemala) CSD Municipal	Torn pericardium during a match against CSD Comunicaciones when he collided with Mario Rafael Rodríguez. He died later in a hospital.
27 October 2004	Serginho (BRA)	30	(Brazil) São Caetano	Sudden cardiac death during a Campeonato Brasileiro Série A match against São Paulo. His death motivated a revamping of practices in medical assistance from clubs and stricter preventive measures in sports grounds in Brazil.
5 December 2004	Cristiano Júnior (BRA)	24	Dempo Sports Club (IND)	Collided with Mohun Bagan goalkeeper Subrata Paul in the 78th minute of the Federation Cup finals while scoring his second goal. He staggered away, then collapsed. Attempts to revive him were unsuccessful and he was pronounced dead upon arrival at Hosmat Hospital.
12 April 2005	Paul Sykes (ENG)	28	(England) Folkestone Invicta	Collapsed on the pitch 30 minutes into the game against Margate F.C. in the Kent Senior Cup semi-final. An undiagnosed heart defect was identified as the cause of his death.
25 June 2005	Hugo Cunha (POR)	28	(Portugal) U.D. Leiria	Died suddenly from a cardiac arrest during a football match played with friends in Montemor-o-Novo.
6 December 2005	Alessandro (BRA)	23	(Brazil) Ferroviário	Died of a myocardial infarction, after a physical indisposition followed by a faint, during a training at Vila Olímpica Elzir Cabral. He had suffered from similar health problems during other trainings sessions, a week before his death.
11 April 2006	Victor Alfonso Guerrero (COL)	17	(Colombia) Envigado F.C.	Lost consciousness during a training match and died en route to hospital.
12 June 2006	Rasmus Green (DEN)	26	(Denmark) Næstved BK	Suffered a heart attack during a training session and was, despite revival attempts from teammates and a doctor, declared dead upon arrival at the hospital. The number 7 was afterwards retired in his honor.
10 August 2006	Gökmen Yıldıran (TUR)	28	(Turkey) Elazığspor	Suffered a heart attack during training and died before being taken to the hospital.
30 August 2006	Mohamed Abdelwahab (EGY)	23	(Egypt) Al Ahly	Died from undetected heart defect during a training match.
9 September 2006	Matt Gadsby (ENG)	27	(England) Hinckley United	Collapsed on the pitch during a Conference North game against Harrogate Town and died soon afterwards at Harrogate District Hospital. Medical tests revealed he died from a heart condition known as arrhythmogenic right ventricular cardiomyopathy.
18 September 2006	Nilton Mendes (BRA)	30	FC Shakhter Karagandy (KAZ)	Collapsed on the pitch during a training session and died in the ambulance on the way to the hospital. He was a former top scorer and best player for the Kazakhstan Premier League.
27 March 2007	Ivan Karačić (BIH)	19	(Bosnia and Herzegovina) NK Široki Brijeg	Heart attack and died during a training match in Široki Brijeg.
19 August 2007	Anton Reid (ENG)	16	(England) Walsall	Collapsed and died during youth team pre-season training. An inquest recorded a verdict of natural causes.
28 August 2007	Antonio Puerta (ESP)	22	(Spain) Sevilla	Collapsed during a match against Getafe. He died later in hospital after several cardiac arrests. Autopsy revealed arrhythmogenic right ventricular cardiomyopathy.
29 August 2007	Chaswe Nsofwa (ZAM)	28	Hapoel Be'er Sheva (ISR)	Sudden heart failure during a training match against Maccabi Be'er Sheva.
29 December 2007	Phil O'Donnell (SCO)	35	(Scotland) Motherwell	Collapsed during his team's 5–3 win against Dundee United with what was later confirmed as left ventricular failure. He died on the way to the hospital.
9 February 2008	Guy Tchingoma (GAB)	22	(Gabon) FC 105 Libreville	Died shortly after a league game against Union Sportive O'Mbila. During the match, he collided with an opponent. He managed to finish the game, but collapsed shortly after and medics were unable to revive him.
16 February 2008	Hervé King (ENG)	27	(England) Ringmer	Collapsed 17 minutes into a game against Three Bridges of an undetermined cause (heart attack suspected).
3 April 2008	Hrvoje Ćustić (CRO)	24	(Croatia) NK Zadar	Collided with a concrete wall during a game against Cibalia and died in a hospital 5 days later of severe head injuries
31 May 2008	Rustem Bulatov (RUS)	34	(Russia) Torpedo SDYuSShOR Kaluga	Felt ill during a game, died later that day in a hospital.
15 March 2009	Jumadi Abdi (INA)	26	(Indonesia) PKT Bontang	Collapsed after an incident with Denny Tarkas during a match against Persela Lamongan. Denny kicked Jumadi's stomach when he was trying to get the ball. Jumadi died in a hospital 8 days later of severe infection.
2 April 2009	Víctor Hugo Ávalos (PAR)	37	(Paraguay) Villa Florida	Heart attack during a match against Salesianito. He died the next day.
26 May 2009	Orobosan Adun (NGR)	28	(Nigeria) Warri Wolves FC	Before an away match with Enugu Rangers, the goalkeeper was assaulted by thugs suspected to be fans of the opposition team. He died 3 days later from internal haemorrhage during a training session.
8 August 2009	Daniel Jarque (ESP)	26	(Spain) RCD Espanyol	Cardiac arrest following a training session.
2 September 2009	Alexandru Iatan (ROM)	19	(Romania) Dunărea Giurgiu	Goalkeeper was hit in the abdominal area with a ball while trying to defend a penalty kick during team training. He continued his training but a few moments later he collapsed and died of cardiac arrest.
15 November 2009	Maurizio Greco (ITA)	25	TuS Güldenstern Stade (GER)	Collapsed during a match against Lupo Martini Wolfsburg at Campers Höhe and died later in the hospital.
18 November 2009	Salem Saad (UAE)	31	(United Arab Emirates) Al-Nasr	Died of a heart attack during a training session.

=== 2010–2019 ===
Date	Name	Age	Team	Notes
24 January 2010	Yannick Dago (CMR)	17	Arras Football (FRA)	Collapsed during a match against Etoile Sportive Anzin Saint Aubin and died later on a heart attack.
6 March 2010	Endurance Idahor (NGR)	25	Al-Merreikh (SUD)	Collapsed during a match against Alamal Atbara and died in the ambulance. Autopsy report revealed that he suffered a circulatory collapse from a heart attack.
8 March 2010	Bartholomew Opoku (GHA)	19	(Ghana) Kessben F.C.	Collapsed the day before while playing against league side Liberty. He was quickly taken to hospital and is understood to have stabilized overnight. His death was announced the next day.
9 April 2010	Daniel Robert (BRA)	28	Irtysh Pavlodar (KAZ)	Suffered a heart attack during the warmup prior to a Kazakhstan Premier League fixture against FC Kairat.
2 May 2010	Ambrose Wreh (LBR)	24	(Liberia) Invincible Eleven	Heart failure in a match against Mighty Barrolle. He came on as a substitute in the second half before collapsing in the center circle with no other players near him. He died shortly afterwards upon arrival to a hospital in Monrovia.
8 May 2010	Frederico da Costa Pinheiro (BRA)	26	(Brazil) Mesquita	Suffered cardiac arrest during a Carioca Championship match against Cabofriense and was pronounced dead on arrival at hospital.
18 August 2010	Victor Omogbehin (NGR)	22	Ilford F.C. (ENG)	Collapsed during a league match. He played in the Isthmian Football League game against Lowestoft Town FC.
10 November 2010	Benjamin Owusu (GHA)	21	Cavaliers FC Parakou (BEN)	Collapsed while playing in Benin.
12 December 2010	Emmanuel Ogoli (NGR)	21	(Nigeria) Ocean Boys F.C.	Collapsed on the pitch while playing a league match, and died later in a hospital.
4 August 2011	Naoki Matsuda (JPN)	34	(Japan) Matsumoto Yamaga F.C.	Collapsed during training on 2 August 2011 due to a cardiac arrest after finishing a 15-minute warmup run, and doctors diagnosed his condition as "extremely severe". After two days, he died.
13 November 2011	Bobsam Elejiko (NGR)	30	K. Merksem S.C. (BEL)	Collapsed and died while playing a 5th tier match against F.C. Exc. Kaart
14 April 2012	Piermario Morosini (ITA)	25	(Italy) Livorno	Collapsed during a Serie B game against Pescara. The cause of death was cardiac arrest. Autopsy revealed arrhythmogenic cardiomyopathy with myocardial scar.
5 May 2012	Mohamed Lemine Ould M'Boye (MTN)		(Mauritania) ASC Nasr Zem Zem	Collapsed twenty minutes into a game against FC Legwareb-FC Trarza in a Mauritanian Premier League match. Died on arrival at a hospital due to cardiac arrest. The game was postponed and replayed on 26 May, with Zem Zem winning 2–1.
12 June 2012	Gerome Graham (CAY)	20	(Cayman Islands) Bodden Town	Collapsed during a training session. The cause of death was determined to be hypertrophic cardiomyopathy.
7 July 2012	Arjuna Luiz Venutto Ramos (BRA)	17	(Brazil) São Bernardo	Collapsed during an under-17 championship match against Portuguesa Santista and died from cardiac arrest.
5 August 2012	Chinonso Ihelwere Henry (NGR)	21	Delta Tulcea (ROU)	Collapsed during a friendly game against CS Balotești in the 86th minute, after having been brought on for only 10 minutes. With the temperature being 40 °C, doctors tried reviving him for 30 minutes before declaring him dead. Supposedly, he underwent health tests a week before his death with no signs of problems detected. The cause of his death was heart failure.
2 September 2012	Victor Brännström (SWE)	29	(Sweden) Piteå IF	Collapsed shortly after scoring during a meeting in the Division 2, in which he suffered a cardiac arrest and died after arriving at hospital.
20 October 2012	Jaouad Akaddar (MAR)	28	(Morocco) Hassania Agadir	Suffered a heart attack immediately after the end of a match.
2 April 2013	Quentin Margueritte (FRA)	25	(France) USON Mondeville	Collapsed during a training session. The cause of death was cardiac arrest.
20 April 2013	Dominik Rupp (DEU)	23	(Germany) FSV Hemmersdorf	Collapsed during a Saarlandliga game against Saar 05 Saarbrücken. The cause of death was cardiac arrest.
17 June 2013	Mohammad Fahad (KUW)	32	(Kuwait) Al-Sulaibikhat	In a non-official match played in May 2013, Fahad collided with another player, causing him a severe bleeding in the brain and coma until 17 June, when he died.
21 June 2013	Alen Pamić (CRO)	23	(Croatia) NK Istra 1961	Collapsed during a retreat game for MNK Maružini of a heart attack.
21 July 2013	Yair Clavijo (PER)	18	(Peru) Sporting Cristal	Died during a reserve match against Real Garcilaso. The autopsy determined he died from a cerebral edema with brain herniation caused by hypertrophic cardiomyopathy.
27 July 2013	Sékou Camara (MLI)	27	Pelita Bandung Raya (IDN)	Collapsed on the field during his a practice session in Bandung. He was rushed to the nearest hospital, but died on the way there. The cause of death was a heart attack.
27 August 2013	Héctor Sanabria (ARG)	27	(Argentina) Deportivo Laferrere	Suffered a heart attack in the 29th minute of a league match against General Lamadrid and died before reaching hospital.
17 November 2013	Alex Marques (POR)	20	(Portugal) G.D. Tourizense	Cardiac arrest after seven minutes of the match against Carapinheirense.
23 December 2013	Jamie Skinner (SCO)	13	(Scotland) Tynecastle	Cardiac arrest during a game in the Saughton Park in Edinburgh.
28 February 2014	Kevon Carter (TTO)	30	(Trinidad and Tobago) Defence Force	Died of a heart attack after feeling chest pains during a training session in the morning.
3 May 2014	Kodjo Etonan Adjassou (TGO)	24	Bankstown City FC (AUS)	Collapsed after 10 minutes of the National Premier League NSW Division Two match against Spirit FC.
19 May 2014	Akli Fairuz (IDN)	27	(Indonesia) Persiraja	Died after colliding with opposition goalkeeper during a match in the Indonesian Premier League. He was substituted and admitted to hospital but died due to internal bleeding the next day.
3 September 2014	Carlos Barra (CHL)	23	(Chile) Deportes Maipo Quilicura	Collapsed from cardiac arrest after 20 minutes of a friendly match against Palestino and could not be resuscitated.
19 October 2014	Peter Biaksangzuala (IND)	23	(India) Bethlehem Vengthlang FC	Died from injuries sustained performing a back-flip while celebrating a goal he scored during a match.
10 November 2014	Dipak Adhikari (NPL)		Abu Dhabi Police Force Team (ARE)	Died after collapsing during a match.
30 April 2015	Gregory Mertens (BEL)	24	(Belgium) Sporting Lokeren	Died of heart failure three days after collapsing during a reserve team match against Genk, having never regained consciousness after receiving CPR during the first half.
14 May 2015	Emanuel Ortega (ARG)	21	(Argentina) San Martín de Burzaco	Died after sustaining fatal head injury against a perimeter wall during a Primera C match. All football activities under the Argentine Football Association were suspended the following week, and cushioning protection was made mandatory for such structures.
24 May 2015	Cristian Gómez (ARG)	27	(Argentina) Club Atlético Paraná	Died of heart failure during a Primera B Nacional match.
31 May 2015	Shetemi Ayetigbo (NGA)	16	Belvedere (IRL)	During a Dublin & District Schoolboy League game against St Kevin's Boys, Ayetigbo collapsed and died.
13 June 2015	David Oniya (NGA)	30	T-Team (MYS)	Collapsed three minutes after kick-off in a friendly match against Kelantan and died less than one hour later in hospital.
7 July 2015	Junior Dian (ENG)	23	(England) Tonbridge Angels	Collapsed in a pre-season friendly game at Whyteleafe.
2 September 2015	Stelios Markousis (GRC)	18	(Greece) Veria	Suffered a heart attack during a training session and died shortly afterwards.
6 December 2015	Abdul Haruna (NGA)	27	(Nigeria) Kano Pillars F.C.	Collapsed and died on the pitch playing in a friendly match between professional and amateur select sides in Kano.
1 May 2016	(Australia) Stefan Petrovski	18	(Malaysia) Melaka United	Struck by lightning while training on 5 April, died in hospital.
6 May 2016	(Cameroon) Patrick Ekeng	26	(Romania) Dinamo București	Collapsed in a match against FC Viitorul Constanța seven minutes after he came on from the bench and was taken to hospital, where he died less than two hours later.
7 May 2016	(Brazil) Bernardo Ribeiro	26	(Brazil) Friburguense	Collapsed during a friendly match before being taken to a hospital, where he died of a suspected heart attack.
9 May 2016	(Cameroon) Jeanine Christelle Djomnang	26	Cameroon	Goalkeeper collapsed during her warm-up before a match and died of a suspected heart attack.
15 August 2016	(Nigeria) Michael Umanika	20	(Azerbaijan) Zagatala	Midfielder collapsed during a team training session in Zagatala. He died of a suspected heart attack.
11 September 2016	(Burkina Faso) Ben Idrissa Dermé	34	(France) AJ Biguglia	Died of a heart attack during a French cup match.
13 September 2016	(England) Dan Wilkinson	26	(England) Shaw Lane	Suffered a cardiac arrest on the pitch in an Integro League Cup match against Brighouse Town. He died hours later in hospital.
19 September 2016	(Jamaica) Dominic James	18	(Jamaica) Waterhouse F.C.	Collapsed after five minutes of the Manning Cup match between St George's College and Excelsior High, and was pronounced dead on arrival at the hospital.
13 November 2016	(England) Jack Atkinson	18	(England) Holland FC	Collapsed on the pitch after suffering a heart attack during an under-18s match.
4 December 2016	(Tanzania) Ismail Mrisho Khalfan	19	(Tanzania) Mbao F.C.	After struggling to get off the ground when tackled by an opponent during the Tanzania Under-20 League match against Mwadui, the striker collapsed and died of a heart attack.
26 April 2017	(Gabon) Moïse Brou Apanga	35	(Gabon) FC 105 Libreville	Defender died after suffering a heart attack during team training.
27 April 2017	(Botswana) Gofaone Tiro	26	(Botswana) Township Rollers	Winger collapsed from a heart attack during team training session and was pronounced dead upon arrival at hospital.
5 June 2017	(Ivory Coast) Cheick Tioté	30	(China) Beijing Enterprises	Defensive midfielder; collapsed and lost consciousness during a training session and was pronounced dead later that day from a suspected heart attack.
17 September 2017	(Netherlands) Luc Jacobs	26	(Netherlands) SC Helmondia	Collapsed early in the second half of the match against SPV Vlierden. His heart was restarted using a defibrillator and CPR was attempted for half an hour, but he died in hospital that night.
1 October 2017	(Georgia (country)) Shota Maminashvili	31	(Georgia (country)) FC Zugdidi	Goalkeeper collapsed during his warmup routine ahead of the Erovnuli Liga 2 match against FC WIT Georgia and died in hospital.
15 October 2017	(Indonesia) Choirul Huda	38	(Indonesia) Persela Lamongan	Goalkeeper; while trying to retrieve the match ball from an opponent during a match against Semen Padang, he collided with his teammate Ramon Mesquita and suffered injuries to his lower jaw and head. He was briefly conscious immediately after the collision, but later died from his injuries in a hospital.
2 November 2017	(Belgium) Joel Lobanzo	17	(Belgium) Royal Antwerp U19	Collapsed in training with the U-19 team on 31 October. He died a day later. It is believed that a heart attack was the cause of death.
12 December 2017	(Republic of Ireland) Izzy Dezu	17	(Republic of Ireland) Shelbourne U16	Fell ill during a league match in the Athletic Union League Complex against St. Kevin's Boys. He died later in the day at a hospital in Dublin.
3 February 2018	(Spain) Nacho Barbera	15	(Spain) UD Alzira	Collapsed on the field during a youth team match against Ontinyent.
13 February 2018	(Brazil) Danilinho	32	(Brazil) Juazeirense	Suffered a heart attack during training.
24 March 2018	(Croatia) Bruno Boban	25	(Croatia) Marsonia 1909	Winger collapsed during a match against Požega Slavonia. After several minutes of attempted resuscitation by medical staff and a retired doctor who was spectating, he was pronounced dead.
4 May 2018	(South Africa) Luyanda Ntshangase	21	(South Africa) Maritzburg United	Midfielder who was struck by lightning during a friendly game on 1 May 2018. He died three days later from his injuries.
14 September 2018	(France) Mamadou Camara	26	(France) USON Mondeville	Collapsed from a heart attack during training.
6 October 2018	(Brazil) Ramon Neto da Costa	31	(Brazil) Araranguá Esporte Clube	Attacker who died during a friendly game.
4 November 2018	(Nigeria) Ekundayo Ebenezer Mawoyeka	23	(Turkey) Sarayköyspor	Collapsed in the 35th minute of the match against Yesilkoyspor at the Servergazi Stadium. He was confirmed to have died of a heart attack upon arrival at the Denizli State Hospital.
22 January 2019	(Ivory Coast) Fodé Sidibé		(Ivory Coast) ASC Bouaké	Defender collapsed during a training session.
2 March 2019	(Gabon) Herman Tsinga	30	(Gabon) Akanda FC	Collapsed after challenging for a header in a Championnat National 1 match against Missile. Received cardiac massage on the field for twenty minutes but died en route to hospital.
25 April 2019	(Burundi) Faty Papy	28	(Eswatini) Malanti Chiefs	Midfielder had a heart attack while playing in a match in Eswatini.
17 June 2019	(Liberia) Edwin Boakai		(Liberia) National Port Authority Anchors	Goalkeeper collapsed and died during a training session.
26 September 2019	(Uruguay) Agustín Martínez	17	(Uruguay) Boston River	After being substituted in a league match against Cerro with a knee injury, he suffered cardiac arrest on the bench. He was transferred to hospital but died three days later.
7 November 2019	(Brazil) Renan Henrique Santos	16	(Brazil) Água Santa U17	Collapsed during a training session due to cardiac arrest.

=== 2020–present ===
Date	Name	Age	Team	Notes
8 March 2020	(Nigeria) Chineme Martins	22	(Nigeria) Nasarawa United F.C.	Collapsed and died during a league game
27 November 2020	(Iraq) Sajjad Ali		(Iraq) Al-Sulaikh	Died of a heart attack while playing a league match against Bismayah.
7 January 2021	(Brazil) Alex Apolinário	24	(Portugal) Alverca	On 3 January 2021, went into cardiac arrest at the 27th minute of a league match. He was revived after several attempts and taken to the hospital, where he was put in an induced coma and died four days later.
10 January 2021	(France) Christopher Maboulou	30	(France) Thonon Evian	Collapsed while playing football in Paris, and despite being rushed to the hospital he died later that day.
18 April 2021	(Jamaica) Tremaine Stewart	33	(Jamaica) Portmore United	Collapsed while playing football in Spanish Town, and despite being rushed to the hospital he died later that day.
13 May 2021	(Paraguay) Jhomar Morales	22	(England) Wilmington FC	Collapsed and died after a heart attack.
1 June 2021	(Italy) Giuseppe Perrino	29	(Italy) Parma	Died of a heart attack during a memorial match for his late brother
22 June 2021	(Hungary) Viktor Marcell Hegedüs	18	(Hungary) Andráshida SC	Collapsed during a training warmup.
22 December 2021	(Egypt) Ahmed Amin	23	(Egypt) Al Rebat & Al Anwar SC	Goalkeeper collapsed in the team locker room following a sudden cardiac arrest after a training session. Immediate attempts to resuscitate him failed. He was then rushed to a hospital nearby but was reported to have died along the way.
22 December 2021	(Indonesia) Taufik Ramsyah	20	(Indonesia) Tornado FC	Goalkeeper suffered a fractured skull after colliding with a Wahana FC player in a Liga 3 Riau game. He died from his injuries after being in a coma for several days as well as undergoing surgery for his fractured skull.
23 December 2021	(Oman) Mukhaled Al-Raqadi	29	(Oman) Muscat Club	Collapsed during the warm up for a game against Suwaiq Club in the Omantel Elite League.
23 December 2021	(Croatia) Marin Ćaćić	23	(Croatia) NK Nehaj	Died in hospital after a cardiac arrest two days prior during training.
25 December 2021	(Algeria) Sofiane Loukar	30	(Algeria) MC Saïda	Collapsed in the middle of a match and died instantly.
3 January 2022	(Guatemala) Marcos Menaldo	25	(Guatemala) Marquense	According to various reports, the central defender was participating in training with his teammates when he fainted, for which he was transferred to a medical center where his death was confirmed.
2 February 2022	(Greece) Alexandros Lampis	21	(Greece) GS Ilioupoli	Collapsed on the field after five minutes after suffering a cardiac arrest. There was no defibrillator available in the stadium and it took an ambulance 20 minutes to reach the stadium. The match against Ermionida was abandoned following the incident.
15 July 2022	(Russia) Aleksandr Kozlov	29	(Russia) Zorkiy Krasnogorsk	Reportedly suffered a blood clot during training.
14 September 2022	(Equatorial Guinea) Mariano Ondo	23	(Equatorial Guinea) Cano Sport Academy	Right back; collapsed and lost consciousness during a training session and was pronounced dead later that day from a suspected heart attack.
30 September 2022	(Romania) Alexandru Vagner	33	(Romania) Inter Cristian	Had a heart attack during training in his team's sports facility, he was subsequently transported by emergency to Brasov County Emergency Hospital but could not be resuscitated.
29 November 2022	(Colombia) Andrés Balanta	22	(Argentina) Atlético Tucumán	Collapsed to the ground due to cardiorespiratory arrest during training. Despite ambulances arriving to try to revive him, he was pronounced dead after 40 minutes.
3 December 2022	(Kosovo) Erion Kajtazi	17	(Kosovo) Trepça '89	Collapsed to the ground due to cardiorespiratory arrest during a match.
7 March 2023	(South Africa) Siphamandla Mtolo	29	(South Africa) Richards Bay	Midfielder collapsed and died during training. No official cause of death was provided.
27 March 2023	(Philippines) Andrew Sarakinis	14	(Philippines) Kaya and San Agustin Golden Eagles	Collapsed during a Rizal Football Association match for Colegio de San Agustin against Xavier School and rushed to Cardinal Hospital where he died.
12 April 2023	(Croatia) Martin Filipčić	15	(Croatia) Samobor	In the 60th minute of a youth league match against Dugo Selo, he informed the referee he was not feeling well and then collapsed while receiving medical attention. He was reportedly alive when the ambulance arrived but was pronounced dead soon after. According to other people, he had felt weak throughout the day and had a headache before the match began.
9 August 2023	(Brazil) Deon	36	(Brazil) Bahia de Feira	Collapsed during a training section, resuscitation was attempted while he was still on site, but his death was confirmed by paramedics.
11 November 2023	(Ghana) Raphael Dwamena	28	(Albania) KF Egnatia	Collapsed during the Kategoria Superiore match against FK Partizani Tirana after suffering a cardiac arrest.
28 November 2023	(Germany) Agyemang Diawusie	25	(Germany) SSV Jahn Regensburg	On 4 November 2023 he was substituted early in a 3. Liga match against TSV 1860 Munich with breathing problems and died nearly two weeks later from a heart disease.
31 December 2023	(Angola) Pedro Banga	20	(Portugal) Marítimo B	While playing in a match in Angola on vacation, Banga suffered a cardiac arrest and collapsed on the pitch. He was taken to a nearby hospital, but died shortly after.
4 February 2024	(England) Adam Ankers	17	(England) Wycombe Wanderers U19	On 31 January 2024, Ankers collapsed on field after suffering a cardiac arrest playing for Wycombe Wanderers' U19 team. He died in hospital on 4 February 2024 as a result of brain damage. It was later found he had suffered from undiagnosed arrhythmogenic cardiomyopathy which had resulted in his cardiac arrest.
18 May 2024	(Brazil) Afonso Rossa	19	(Brazil) Águia de Marabá U20	Suffered a heart attack during the team's warm-up, in a qualifying match for the local U20 competition.
31 May 2024	(Costa Rica) Emmanuel Hidalgo	15	(Costa Rica) Cartaginés U15	He collapsed after suffering a cardiac arrest during a training. He was taken by ambulance to a hospital, where he died shortly after arriving.
5 July 2024	(Egypt) Ahmed Refaat	31	(Egypt) Modern Sport FC	Suffered a heart attack during a match against Al Ittihad Alexandria Club.
27 July 2024	(Syria) 12 players	10 to 16	(Israel) Hashalom Majdal Shams	Killed in a rocket strike on the El Shams Field in the occupied Golan Heights.
27 August 2024	(Uruguay) Juan Izquierdo	27	(Uruguay) Nacional	Fainted on the field during a round of 16 match for the 2024 Copa Libertadores against São Paulo FC on 22 August. He was taken by ambulance to the Albert Einstein Israelite Hospital in São Paulo but suffered cardio-respiratory arrest and was declared brain dead on 27 August.
11 December 2024	(England) Kaylen Dennis	17	(England) Walthamstow	Dennis suffered a cardiac arrest after a tackle during the game of the U 23 of Walthamstow in the middle of the game at Barnet College.
12 December 2024	(Kosovo) Erion Morina	22	(Kosovo) Vushtrria	On 27 October 2024, he suffered a cardiac arrest during a training session with the club, where he fell into a coma and died several weeks later.
19 March 2025	(China) Guo Jiaxuan	18	(China) Beijing Guoan	On 6 February 2025, he suffered a fatal head injury after colliding with another player in a training match with a Spanish club.
9 April 2025	(Peru) Helar Gonzales	21	(Peru) Real Titan NC	On 7 April 2025, he collided with the goalkeeper during a 2025 Copa Perú match and suffered a fatal head injury.
25 September 2025	(England) Billy Vigar	21	(England) Chichester City	On 20 September 2025, Vigar was injured in an Isthmian League match at Wingate & Finchley, after colliding with a concrete wall, and was put into an induced coma. On the morning of 25 September, Vigar died as a result of the injury.
29 September 2025	(Spain) Raúl Ramírez	19	(Spain) Colindres	On 27 September 2025, Ramírez collided with an opponent during a league match against Revilla and suffered a cardiac arrest. He was initially treated by his coach and a nurse from the crowd, but suffered several more cardiac arrests. Ramírez died in hospital two days later.
3 November 2025	(Bosnia and Herzegovina) Mladen Žižović	44	(Serbia) Radnički 1923	Former player, the Radnički coach Mladen Žižović suffered a heart attack and died on the sidelines during a match against FK Mladost Lučani.
22 January 2026	(Angola) Nassur Bacem	27	(Portugal) Moncarapachense	Suffered a collapse during an Algarve Cup match. His death was confirmed during transport to the hospital.
8 February 2026	(England) Amelia Aplin	15	(England) Oxford United W.F.C.	Collapsed while playing in goal for Oxford United in an academy match at home to Fulham F.C. Women's academy side on 7 February.
4 August 2026	(Thailand) Sofwan Awae	24	(Thailand) Yala United F.C.	A lightning struck the field during a match, injuring other players. Was transported to the hospital, but died because of the injuries.
22 August 2026	(England) (Portugal) Quévin Castro	25	(Portugal) Real Sport Clube	Collapsed in the first half of a friendly match of his club Real Sport Clube against C.F. Estrela da Amadora in Portugal.
3 November 2026	(Spain) Jesús de Miguel	30	(Spain) CD Tenerife	On 2 November 2026, he collided with FC Andorra goalkeeper Jesús Owono and suffered a cardiac arrest, dying the following day.
15 November 2026	(Argentina) Abel Núñez	18	(Argentina) FC Ezeiza	Died following a collision during an AFA youth tournament.

== See also ==
- Sudden cardiac death of athletes
- Sudden arrhythmic death syndrome
- List of premature professional wrestling deaths
- List of marathon fatalities
- List of accidents involving sports teams
