= Idahor =

Idahor is a surname. Notable people with the surname include:

- Endurance Idahor (1984–2010), Nigerian footballer
- Lucky Idahor (born 1980), Nigerian footballer
