= Gökmen =

Gökmen is a Turkish surname and a masculine given name. Notable people with the surname include:

== Given name ==
- Gökmen Özdenak (1947–2025), Turkish football player
- Gökmen Yıldıran (1978–2006), Turkish football player

== Surname ==
- Bedriye Tahir Gökmen, Turkish pilot
- Fatin Gökmen (1877–1955), Turkish astronomer
- Jennifer Eaton Gökmen (born 1971), American writer and editor
- Oğuz Gökmen (1916–2007), Turkish writer and diplomat
- Rengim Gökmen (born 1955), Turkish conductor
