= Héctor Sanabria =

Héctor Sanabria might refer to:

- Héctor Sanabria (footballer, born 1945), Mexican footballer
- Héctor Sanabria (footballer, born 1985), Argentine footballer
