= Gofaone Tiro =

Motswana footballer

- Tiro with Township Rollers F.C.

Personal information
- Full name: Gofaone Tiro
- Date of birth: 21 January 1991
- Place of birth: Gulubane, Botswana
- Date of death: 27 April 2017 (aged 26)
- Place of death: Tlokweng, Botswana
- Height: 1.76 m (5 ft 9 in)
- Position: Winger

Youth career
- Chiefs Botswana Development Team

Senior career*
Years	Team	Apps	(Gls)
2000–2004	Chiefs Botswana		
2004–2006	Flamengo Desportos		
2006-2013	Uniao Flamengo Santos		
2013-2017	Township Rollers		
- * Club domestic league appearances and goals

Gofaone Tiro (21 January 1991 – 27 April 2017) was a Motswana professional footballer who played as a winger. Tiro played for several teams including Uniao Flamengo Santos and Township Rollers over a career spanning seventeen years but was never chosen to represent the Botswana national football team at any level.

== Club career ==
He started his career with Chiefs Botswana and stayed for four years before moving to Gabane-based club Flamengo Desportos. When the club merged with Gabane Santos to form Uniao Flamengo Santos he was one of the players that were retained, winning the club top goalscorer award and being named the man of the match in the 2012 FA Cup before leaving for Township Rollers in 2013.

At Rollers Tiro quickly asserted himself as one of the best young players in the country, helping the Premier League giants to two league titles. However, he never won the Mascom Top 8 Cup and was a losing finalist three consecutive seasons. Tiro died of a heart attack on 27 April 2017 after collapsing during a training session. He was rushed to hospital but was declared dead on arrival. Rollers would go on to win the 2017 league title a month after his death.

== Style of play ==
Although predominantly a right winger, Tiro could play on either flank. He was known for his terrifying pace down the flank coupled with a technical reading of the game which gave him essentially the same function as a wide playmaker. He liked cutting back penetrative passes for forward running from behind but could also get into the box himself and take on the defenders with his impressive dribbling skills. Tiro's uncanny ability to control the game endeared him to the Rollers faithful as 'the President', though sometimes he shared the nickname 'the Principal' with midfield stalwart Lawrence Majawa.

== Death and tributes ==
According to the official Township Rollers statement Tiro collapsed during a training session on 27 April 2017. He was rushed to the nearest hospital by team manager Motshegetsi Mafa and team medic Patrick Rachaba but was declared dead on arrival. An early report speculated that his heart was swollen. Later a post-mortem report confirmed a heart attack as the cause of death. He was buried in his home village of Gulubane.

Tiro's death prompted the Botswana Football Association to start a systematic heart defect scanning programme after Santa Green player Leatile Setabosigo also died under similar circumstances. Furthermore, steps were taken to mandate the inclusion of a qualified doctor as part of a club's staff in Botswana's club licensing regulations.

== Honours ==
=== Club ===
Township Rollers

- Botswana Premier League: 2013-14, 2015-16

== See also ==
- List of association footballers who died while playing
