= Mitotônio =

Brazilian footballer (1916–1951)

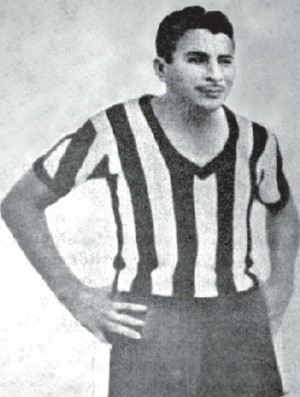
- Mitotônio in 1948

Personal information
- Full name: Antônio Edgard da Silveira
- Date of birth: 22 February 1916
- Place of birth: Granja, Ceará
- Date of death: 1 April 1951 (aged 35)
- Place of death: Fortaleza, Ceará
- Position: Left winger

Senior career*
Years	Team	Apps	(Gls)
1938–1941	Fortaleza		
1941–1951	Ceará	215	(151)
1945	→ Náutico (loan)		
- * Club domestic league appearances and goals

Antônio Edgard da Silveira, commonly known as Mitotônio, (22 February 1916 – 1 April 1951) was a Brazilian footballer who played as a left winger for Ceará Sporting Club.

== Career ==
Born in Granja, Ceará, Mitotônio began playing club football for Fortaleza in 1938. He became Ceará state championships winner with Fortaleza in 1938 while appearing sparingly.

In 1941 Fortaleza's coach Valdemar Santos moved to Ceará, taking players with him including Mitotônio. During Mitotônio's 10 years with Ceará, he won Ceará state championships in 1941, 1942 and 1948. He was part of a Ceará team which beat Sussex Traders, a club from England which toured Brazil in 1949, 16–0. In total, he scored 151 goals in 215 appearances for the club.

Mitotônio also had a brief spell with Náutico in 1945, winning the Pernambuco state championship.

== Death ==
On 31 March 1951, Mitotônio scored the opening goal for Ceará in the first half of Ceará's Campeonato Cearense match against Gentilândia at Estádio Presidente Vargas before becoming ill. He was sent to hospital where he was diagnosed with acute stomach congestion. On 1 April, after he had returned home, he died from a stroke.

In folklore, Mitotônio's death was falsely directly attributed to the fact that he had eaten panelada, a heavy dish of Ceará cuisine, for lunch before the football match.

== Honours ==
Fortaleza

- Campeonato Cearense: 1938

Ceará

- Campeonato Cearense: 1941, 1942, 1948

Náutico

- Campeonato Pernambucano: 1945
