= Luyanda Ntshangase =

South African footballer

- Ntshangase with Maritzburg United

Personal information
- Date of birth: 25 January 1997
- Place of birth: Imbali, South Africa
- Date of death: 4 May 2018 (aged 21)
- Place of death: KwaZulu-Natal, South Africa
- Height: 1.85 m (6 ft 1 in)
- Position: Midfielder

Youth career
- –2016: KZN Academy

Senior career*
Years	Team	Apps	(Gls)
2016–2018	Maritzburg United	4	(0)
- * Club domestic league appearances and goals

Luyanda Ntshangase (25 January 1997 – 4 May 2018) was a South African soccer player who played in the South African Premier Division for Maritzburg United.

== Death ==
During a friendly game on 1 March 2018, Ntshangase was struck by lightning, suffering burns to his chest. Despite being taken to hospital and placed in an induced coma, he succumbed to his injuries and was pronounced dead on 4 May 2018.

== Career statistics ==
=== Club ===
Club	Season	League			Cup		Continental		Other		Total	
Club	Season	Division	Apps	Goals	Apps	Goals	Apps	Goals	Apps	Goals	Apps	Goals
Maritzburg United	2016–17	ABSA Premiership	2	0	1 (Note: Appearances in the Telkom Knockout)	0	0	0	–		3	0
Maritzburg United	2017–18	ABSA Premiership	2	0	0	0	0	0	–		2	0
Career total			4	0	1	0	0	0	–		5	0

== See also ==
- List of association footballers who died while playing
