= Bartholomew Opoku =

Ghanaian footballer

Personal information
- Date of birth: 1990
- Date of death: 9 March 2010 (aged 19)

Senior career*
Years	Team	Apps	(Gls)
–2010	Kessben		
- * Club domestic league appearances and goals

Bartholomew Opoku (1990 – 9 March 2010) was a Ghanaian footballer who played in the Ghanaian top flight with Kessben. He died after collapsing in a game against Liberty Professionals.

== See also ==
- List of association footballers who died while playing
