= Jumadi Abdi =

Indonesian footballer (1983–2009)

Personal information
- Full name: Jumadi Abdi
- Date of birth: 14 March 1983
- Place of birth: Balikpapan, Indonesia
- Date of death: 15 March 2009 (aged 26)
- Place of death: Bontang, Indonesia
- Position: Midfielder

Senior career*
Years	Team	Apps	(Gls)
2001–2002	Persiba Balikpapan		
- Pelita Krakatau Steel
- Persikota Tangerang
2007–2009	PKT Bontang		
- * Club domestic league appearances and goals

Jumadi Abdi (14 March 1983 – 15 March 2009) was an Indonesian footballer who played as a midfielder. He last played for PKT Bontang. He died eight days after a collision with Persela's player on 7 March 2009.

== Club ==
Abdi made a debut career while playing for Persiba Balikpapan in Premier Division. He played in 2001–2002. After Persiba promoted he moved to Pelita Krakatau Steel for two seasons. Then, he moved to Persikota. Last, he played for PKT Bontang.

== National team ==
Abdi had played for Indonesia national under-23 football team in 2005 SEA Games. He also played for Indonesia national under-20 football team, though he had yet to make his full senior debut.

== Death ==
Abdi was sent to hospital after having a collision with Persela's player Deny Tarkas on 7 March 2009 at Mulawarman Stadium. He suffered an injury to the stomach and had surgery on his intestines on 10 March. He died on 15 March 2009 at PT Pupuk Kalimantan Timur Hospital, Bontang. He was buried at Taman Merdeka Public Cemetery.

== Personal life ==
Abdi was born on 14 Maret 1983. He was the last child of seven siblings. He planned to marry Robiyatul Adawiyah, his high school friend on 5 April 2009.

== See also ==
- List of association footballers who died while playing
