= Bruno Boban =

Croatian footballer

- Boban with NK Zagreb

Personal information
- Date of birth: 12 August 1992
- Place of birth: Požega, Croatia
- Date of death: 24 March 2018 (aged 25)
- Place of death: Slavonski Brod, Croatia
- Cause of death: Heart failure
- Position: Midfielder

Senior career*
Years	Team	Apps	(Gls)
–2014	Slavonija Požega		
2014–2016	Zagreb	21	(3)
2016–2018	Slavonija Požega		
2018	Marsonia		
- * Club domestic league appearances and goals

Bruno Boban (12 August 1992 – 24 March 2018) was a Croatian footballer who played professionally for NK Zagreb. He died while representing Marsonia, after collapsing in a game against Slavonija Požega.

== Career statistics ==
=== Club ===
Club	Season	League			Cup		Other		Total	
Club	Season	Division	Apps	Goals	Apps	Goals	Apps	Goals	Apps	Goals
Zagreb	2013–14	2. HNL	3	3	0	0	0	0	3	3
Zagreb	2014–15	1. HNL	11	0	0	0	0	0	11	0
Zagreb	2015–16	1. HNL	7	0	1 (Note: Appearances in the Croatian Cup)	0	0	0	8	0
Career total			21	3	1	0	0	0	22	3

== See also ==
- List of association footballers who died while playing
