= Siphamandla Mtolo =

South African soccer player

Siphamandla "Spepe" Mtolo
- Mtolo with Richards Bay

Personal information
- Full name: Siphamandla Themba Mtolo
- Date of birth: 28 November 1993
- Date of death: 7 March 2023 (aged 29)
- Positions: Defender; midfielder

Senior career*
Years	Team	Apps	(Gls)
2017–2020	Uthongathi	77	(0)
2020–2023	Richards Bay	66	(0)
- * Club domestic league appearances and goals

Siphamandla Mtolo (28 November 1993 – 7 March 2023) was a South African soccer player who played as a midfielder. He last served as captain for Richards Bay in the Premier Soccer League, before fatally collapsing during a training session.

== Career ==
Mtolo became captain of Richards Bay and helped the team win the 2021-22 National First Division and thus promotion to the 2022-23 South African Premier Division. He missed the start of that season because of a knee injury requiring surgery. Despite prospects of return being in February 2023, Mtolo surpassed expectations and made his Premier Division debut in December 2022 as a substitute. His last game was on 4 March 2023 against Kaizer Chiefs.

On 7 March, Mtolo collapsed during the team's training session. It was an ordinary training with 15 minutes left. When assisted by teammates and the club's physiotherapist, Mtolo struggled to breathe. He was rushed towards a hospital in a private car belonging to Richards Bay's general manager, but died underway.

== Personal life ==
Siphamandla Mtolo was nicknamed Spepe. He was buried in his hometown of Shakaskraal. His funeral service took place on Nkobongo Sports Ground, and several teammates were casket-bearers.

== See also ==
- List of association footballers who died while playing
