= Marius Șuleap =

Romanian footballer

Personal information
- Full name: Marius Mircea Șuleap
- Date of birth: 11 September 1979 (age 47)
- Place of birth: Dorohoi, Romania
- Height: 1.80 m (5 ft 11 in)
- Position: Defensive midfielder

Senior career*
Years	Team	Apps	(Gls)
1998–2000	FC Baia Mare (Note: The statistics for the 1999–2000 Divizia C season are unavailable.)	11	(0)
2000–2001	Rocar București	19	(2)
2001	Universitatea Craiova	1	(0)
2002	Petrolul Ploiești	6	(0)
2002–2004	Politehnica Timișoara	35	(2)
2005	FC Baku	23	(2)
2006	Inter Baku	5	(0)
2007	Unirea Urziceni	1	(0)
2007–2008	Gloria Buzău	12	(0)
2008	FC Snagov	11	(0)
2009	OFI	7	(0)
2009–2010	FC Botoșani	10	(2)
2010	FC Snagov	1	(0)
Total		142	(8)
- * Club domestic league appearances and goals

Marius Mircea Șuleap (born 11 September 1979) is a Romanian former footballer who played as a midfielder. In 2002, during a training session in Cyprus with Universitatea Craiova, Șuleap involuntarily hit the goalkeeper Cristian Neamțu's head with his knee, after which Neamțu went into a coma and died one week later in a hospital.

== Honours ==
FC Baia Mare

- Divizia C: 1999–2000

Rocar București

- Cupa României runner-up: 2000–01

FC Baku

- Azerbaijan League: 2005–06
