= Yair Clavijo =

Peruvian footballer (1995-2013)

- Clavijo with Sporting Cristal in 2012

Personal information
- Date of birth: 4 January 1995
- Place of birth: Lima, Peru
- Date of death: 21 July 2013 (aged 18)
- Place of death: Cuzco, Peru
- Height: 1.83 m (6 ft 0 in)
- Position: Central defender

Senior career*
Years	Team	Apps	(Gls)
2012–2013	Sporting Cristal	0	(0)
- * Club domestic league appearances and goals

Yair Clavijo (4 January 1995 – 21 July 2013) was a Peruvian footballer who played as central defender for Sporting Cristal and the Peru national under-18 football team (a preparatory squad for the Peru national under-20 football team).

== Death ==
Clavijo died of a cerebral edema caused by underlying cardiac condition during a game on 21 July 2013 at the age of 18.

=== Response ===
Clavijo's death sparked discussions on the safety of high-altitude football games. Some, including footballer Roberto Palacios, expressed opposition to games played in high-altitude stadiums. Others, such as footballer Luis Guadalupe, claimed that adaptation to high-altitude locations was possible and that health risks should be evaluated through proper medical screenings from the clubs on their players.

In 2018, the Lima, Peru Superior Court ruled Sporting Cristal had to pay Clavijo's family an indemnification of US$160,000.

== See also ==
- List of association footballers who died while playing
