= Benjamin Owusu =

Ghanaian footballer (1989–2010)

Personal information
- Date of birth: 20 July 1989
- Place of birth: Accra, Ghana
- Date of death: 10 November 2010 (aged 21)
- Height: 1.84 m (6 ft 0 in)
- Position: Defender

Youth career
- 2003–2007: Berekum Arsenal
- 2007–2008: Brescia

Senior career*
| Years | Team | Apps | (Gls) |
| 2008 | Brescia | 1 | (0) |
| 2009 | → Caravaggese (loan) | 9 | (0) |
| 2009–2010 | → U.S. Villazzano (loan) | 12 | (0) |
| 2010 | → Azzurra (loan) | 7 | (1) |
| Total | | 29 | (1) |
- * Club domestic league appearances and goals

Benjamin Owusu (20 July 1989 – 10 November 2010) was a Ghanaian professional footballer who played as a defender.

== Career ==
Born in Accra, Owusu began his career with Berekum Arsenal and joined the primavera team from Brescia, who earned his first professional match in the Serie B on 21 October 2008 against Rimini. On 24 July 2009, he was linked with a possible move to Scafatese. He did not sign a contract and returned to the primavera team of Brescia. He died in 2010 of an illness.

== See also ==
- List of association footballers who died while playing
