= Valtencir =

Brazilian footballer

Personal information
- Full name: Valtencir Pereira Senra
- Date of birth: 11 November 1946
- Place of birth: Juiz de Fora, Brazil
- Date of death: 17 September 1978 (aged 31)
- Place of death: Maringá, Brazil
- Height: 1.90 m (6 ft 3 in)
- Position: Defender

Senior career*
Years	Team	Apps	(Gls)
1967–1976	Botafogo	453	(6)
1976–1978	Colorado-PR		

International career
1968	Brazil	1	(1)
- * Club domestic league appearances and goals as of 19 February 2024

Valtencir Pereira Senra (11 November 1946 – 17 September 1978), simply known as Valtencir (sometimes spelled as Waltencir), was a Brazilian professional footballer who played as a defender.

== Career ==
Capable of playing both as a defender and as a left-back, Valtencir played most of his career at Botafogo, where he made 453 appearances and reached the Brazil national team, playing in a friendly against Argentina on 7 August 1968 and scoring a goal. He was champion of the Taça Brasil and two-time state champion. Some sources claim that he spent time in Venezuelan football in 1976, and in the same year he played for Colorado-PR, the team he played for until 1978.

== Death ==
Valtencir died on 17 September 1978, aged 31, at the Estádio Willie Davids, during the Colorado EC vs. Grêmio Maringá match, after suffering a complete cervical rupture following a knee from player Nivaldo. The knee was accidental and Nivaldo despaired over the move, having to be admitted to a sanatorium.

== Honours ==
Botafogo

- Taça Brasil: 1968
- Campeonato Carioca: 1967, 1968
- Taça Guanabara: 1967, 1968

== See also ==
- List of association footballers who died after on-field incidents
