= Giuseppe Perrino =

Italian footballer (1992–2021)

- Perrino in 2013 with Vigor Lamezia

Personal information
- Date of birth: 3 January 1992
- Place of birth: Italy
- Date of death: 2 June 2021 (aged 29)
- Place of death: Poggiomarino, Italy
- Position: Midfielder

Senior career*
Years	Team	Apps	(Gls)
2011–2012	Ebolitana	31	(0)
2012–2021	Parma	0	(0)
2012–2013	→ Bellaria Igea Marina (loan)	14	(0)
2013–2014	Vigor Lamezia (loan)	7	(0)
- * Club domestic league appearances and goals

Giuseppe Perrino (3 January 1992 – 2 June 2021) was an Italian footballer who played as a midfielder.

== Career ==
Perrino joined Parma from Ebolitana in the summer of 2012 and immediately moved to Bellaria Igea Marina on loan.

He died of a heart attack on 2 June 2021, while playing in a match in honour of his brother, Rocco, who had died from a heart attack three years earlier.

== See also ==
- List of association footballers who died while playing
