= Robert Mitwerandu =

Polish footballer (1970-2000)

- Mitwerandu with GKS Katowice

Personal information
- Date of birth: 27 February 1970
- Place of birth: Chorzów, Poland
- Date of death: 7 May 2000 (aged 30)
- Place of death: Katowice, Poland
- Height: 1.80 m (5 ft 11 in)
- Position: Midfielder

Senior career*
Years	Team	Apps	(Gls)
1987–1988	Stadion Śląski Chorzów		
1988–1991	GKS Katowice	7	(0)
1991–1992	Górnik Katowice		
1992–1996	Naprzód Rydułtowy		
1996–1998	Krisbut Myszków		
1998–2000	Raków Częstochowa		

International career
1985–1986	Poland U16	4	(0)
1986	Poland U18		
- * Club domestic league appearances and goals

Robert Mitwerandu (27 February 1970 – 7 May 2000) was a Polish footballer who played as a midfielder.

== Club career ==
At the age of 17, Mitwerandu signed for Stadion Śląski Chorzów. In 1988, after a season at Stadion Śląski Chorzów, Mitwerandu signed for Ekstraklasa club GKS Katowice. On 20 November 1988, Mitwerandu made history, becoming the first black player to play in the top flight of Polish football, playing 73 minutes in a 3–0 win against Stal Mielec. During the remainder of his time at Katowice, Mitwerandu would fail to make another start, making six more appearances for the club from the bench.

Following his time at GKS Katowice, Mitwerandu signed for third tier side Górnik Katowice. After a single season at Górnik Katowice, Mitwerandu signed for second division side Naprzód Rydułtowy, staying at the club for four years, before signing for Krisbut Myszków in 1998.

In 1998, Mitwerandu signed for Raków Częstochowa. In the 1999–2000 season, Mitwerandu missed a portion of the campaign due to injury. On 6 May 2000, with Raków Częstochowa fighting to stay in the second division, Mitwerandu started in an eventual 3–1 loss against Polar Wrocław in his final game for the club.

== International career ==
Mitwerandu was the first black player to represent Poland at any age level, making his debut for the under-16's on 30 September 1985, coming on as a 63rd minute substitute against Bulgaria. Mitwerandu made four appearances in total for Poland's under-16's.

== Personal life and death ==
Mitwerandu was born in Chorzów, Poland to a Polish mother and a Zimbabwean father who had arrived in Poland as a student. He moved to Katowice at a young age, growing up in the Dąbrówka Mała area of the city. Growing up, Mitwerandu spoke Silesian and Polish fluently.

Mitwerandu's parents met at the Jagiellonian University in Kraków. Mitwerandu's father was Kenyan and Mitwerandu lived in Nairobi for a portion of his childhood, before returning to Poland.

During the early hours on 7 May 2000, Mitwerandu died at his home in Katowice after suffering a heart attack at the age of 30.

== Career statistics ==
Appearances and goals by club, season and competition
Club	Season	League			Polish Cup		Continental		Other		Total	
Club	Season	Division	Apps	Goals	Apps	Goals	Apps	Goals	Apps	Goals	Apps	Goals
GKS Katowice	1988–89	Ekstraklasa	5	0	0	0	—		0	0	5	0
GKS Katowice	1989–90	Ekstraklasa	2	0	0	0	—		0	0	2	0
GKS Katowice	1990–91	Ekstraklasa	0	0	0	0	—		0	0	0	0
Career total			7	0	0	0	0	0	0	0	7	0

== See also ==
- List of association footballers who died after on-field incidents
