= Guy Tchingoma =

Gabonese footballer

Personal information
- Full name: Guy Tchingoma Ngoma
- Date of birth: 3 January 1986
- Place of birth: Pointe-Noire, Congo
- Date of death: 9 February 2008 (aged 22)
- Place of death: Libreville, Gabon
- Position: Midfielder

Senior career*
Years	Team	Apps	(Gls)
2004–2008	FC 105 Libreville	?	(?)

International career
2007	Gabon	2	(?)
- * Club domestic league appearances and goals

Guy Tchingoma Ngoma (3 January 1986 – 9 February 2008) was a footballer who played as a midfielder for Gabonese club FC 105 Libreville. Born in the Republic of the Congo, he represented Gabon internationally.

== International career ==
Tchingoma was born in Pointe-Noire, Republic of the Congo, but given Gabonese citizenship, allowing him to make his debut in an African Nations Cup qualifier against Côte d'Ivoire in Libreville on 8 September 2007.

== Death ==
On 9 February 2008, Tchingoma collapsed after contact with an opposing player late in the match between his club and US Mbiliandzami at the Mondedang de Sibang stadium in the capital. He was later reported dead. There were no medics on call at the game.

== See also ==
- List of association footballers who died while playing
