= Cristian Neamțu =

Romanian footballer

Cristian Neamțu (22 August 1980 – 20 February 2002) was a Romanian football player.

Neamțu was the reserve goalkeeper of the Romanian First Division club FCU Craiova and was considered one of the country's most promising young keepers.

The goalkeeper was pronounced dead after suffering a massive brain bleeding during a training session in Cyprus. Universitatea had been training in Larnaca, Cyprus, ahead of the restart of the Romanian league schedule.

Neamțu had been on a life-support machine at a Nicosia hospital after clashing violently with team-mate Marius Șuleap as he rushed out of his goal to clear from the midfielder. Șuleap's knee accidentally struck the keeper's head, knocking him out. He played first for Universitatea Craiova from 1998 until 2000, later for Electroputere Craiova from 2000 until 2001, next at Rocar București from 2001 until 2002 and in the final he returned to Universitatea Craiova in 2002.

== See also ==
- List of footballers who died while playing
