= Guo Jiaxuan =

Chinese footballer (2006–2025)

Guo Jiaxuan 郭嘉璇
- Guo with Bayern Munich in 2023

Personal information
- Date of birth: 20 March 2006
- Place of birth: Beijing, China
- Date of death: 19 March 2025 (aged 18)
- Place of death: Beijing, China
- Height: 1.87 m (6 ft 2 in)
- Position: Centre-back

Youth career
- 2018–2025: Beijing Guoan

International career
| Years | Team | Apps | (Gls) |
| 2022–2023 | China U17 | | |

Guo Jiaxuan (Chinese: 郭嘉璇; pinyin: Guō Jiāxuán; 20 March 2006 – 19 March 2025) was a Chinese footballer who played as a centre-back. He was a member of the Beijing Guoan youth academy.

== Early and personal life ==
Guo was born in Beijing on 20 March 2006. His parents, Guo Yongbin and Hou Yuemin, came from Jieshou, a rural city in Fuyang, Anhui. He had an older brother named Guo Jiale.

He started playing football at the age of nine, when he joined the local primary school team in Haidian District. In primary school, Guo was above average academically, and won awards at school in mathematics. During that time, Guo practiced football after school each day near Guang'anmen.

In an interview, Guo cited Matthijs de Ligt as a player he liked the playing style of.

== Club career ==
=== Beijing Guoan ===
In 2018, Guo Jiaxuan chose to pursue a career in professional football over attending a prestigious junior high school, and joined the youth team of Beijing Guoan. While in the Beijing Guoan youth setup, Guo attended junior high school in the Shunyi District of Beijing. During his time at Beijing Guoan, Guo has suffered from one patella fracture and two broken toes. After he turned eighteen years old, several China League Two clubs inquired about bringing him in to play first-team football, however Guo wanted to stay at Beijing Guoan and break through to their first-team instead. According to his teammates, he was one of the hardest-working players in the youth side.

=== Bayern Munich World Squad ===
In June 2023, Guo was selected as part of the 2023 Bayern Munich World Squad, and trained with the Bayern Munich U19 team. He joined the team in Germany on 3 July and returned to China on 17 July.

== International career ==
In January 2023, Guo was called up to the China under-17 national team for a training camp in March and April of the same year.

== Injury and death ==
On 6 February 2025, while with the Beijing Football Association U20 squad in Spain in preparation for the 2025 National Games of China, Guo sustained a severe head injury in a training match against Rayo Ciudad Alcobendas CF. Guo went for a tackle and his head impacted an opposition player's knee. After the incident, a helicopter landed on the pitch and carried him to the Hospital Universitario 12 de Octubre. After four hours at the hospital, he was declared brain dead. On 13 February, he was transported back to Beijing for medical care from Madrid. He never regained consciousness.

On 19 March 2025, Guo died at Beijing's Tiantan Hospital, one day before what would have been his nineteenth birthday. Beijing Guoan and Bayern Munich both released statements mourning Guo's death. On 26 March, the video of Guo's tackle was, for the first time, shown to his family, and was also publicly released by the Beijing Football Association. His memorial service was held at Babaoshan Crematorium in Beijing on 30 March.

The Beijing Football Association team, whose training session led to Guo's death, failed to qualify for the main football event of the 2025 National Games of China, as the team was eliminated during the qualification stage on 6 June 2025.

== See also ==
- List of association footballers who died after on-field incidents
