= Alex Apolinário =

Brazilian footballer (1996–2021)

Personal information
- Full name: Alex Sandro dos Santos Apolinário
- Date of birth: 7 November 1996
- Place of birth: Ribeirão Preto, Brazil
- Date of death: 7 January 2021 (aged 24)
- Place of death: Vila Franca de Xira, Portugal
- Height: 1.85 m (6 ft 1 in)
- Position: Attacking midfielder

Youth career
- Botafogo SP
- 2015–2016: Cruzeiro

Senior career*
Years	Team	Apps	(Gls)
2016–2018	Cruzeiro	7	(0)
2018	→ Athletico Paranaense (loan)	5	(1)
2019–2021	Alverca	40	(8)
Total		52	(9)
- * Club domestic league appearances and goals

Alex Sandro dos Santos Apolinário (7 November 1996 – 7 January 2021) was a Brazilian professional footballer who played as an attacking midfielder. On 7 January 2021, he died due to a cardiac arrest suffered during a match.

== Career ==
Born in Ribeirão Preto, São Paulo, Apolinário started his career at Botafogo Futebol Clube (SP) in his native city before signing with Cruzeiro Esporte Clube in 2015. In 2016, he was promoted to their senior team, and on 9 March he made his professional debut in the Primeira Liga in a 2–1 home win over Club Athletico Paranaense, as a 64th-minute substitute for Matías Pisano.

In January 2018, Apolinário transferred to Paranaense on a one-year loan deal. The team won the Campeonato Paranaense, though he was not a regular. On 10 March as a first-half substitute for João Pedro Heinen, he scored his only goal to conclude a 7–1 home win over Rio Branco Sport Club.

Apolinário moved abroad for the first time in January 2019, joining F.C. Alverca of the Campeonato de Portugal, the third tier of the country's football league system. On 17 October that year, he opened the scoring as the club eliminated holders Sporting CP from the third round of the Taça de Portugal with a 2–0 home win; it was only the second time in its history that team was eliminated by a third-tier club.

== Death ==
On 3 January 2021, in a Campeonato de Portugal match against Almeirim in Alverca do Ribatejo, Apolinário went into cardiac arrest in the 27th minute of the match. He was revived after several attempts and stayed at the Vila Franca de Xira Hospital, where he was put in an induced coma. He died four days later; he was 24.

== See also ==
- List of association footballers who died while playing
