= Vágner Bacharel =

Brazilian footballer

Personal information
- Full name: Vágner Araújo Antunes
- Date of birth: 11 December 1954
- Place of birth: Rio de Janeiro, Brazil
- Date of death: 20 April 1990 (aged 35)
- Place of death: Curitiba, Brazil
- Height: 1.82 m (6 ft 0 in)
- Position: Centre-back

Senior career*
Years	Team	Apps	(Gls)
1975–1976	Madureira		
1976	Volta Redonda		
1977–1978	Madureira		
1978–1980	Joinville		
1981	Internacional		
1981	Cruzeiro		
1982–1983	Joinville		
1983–1987	Palmeiras	261	(22)
1987	Botafogo		
1988	Guarani		
1988	Botafogo		
1989	Sport Recife		
1989	Vila Nova		
1989	Fluminense		
1990	Paraná		
- * Club domestic league appearances and goals

Vágner Araújo Antunes (11 December 1954 – 20 April 1990), better known as Vágner Bacharel, was a Brazilian professional footballer who played as a centre-back.

== Career ==
Vágner turned professional at Madureira EC in 1975, being the revelation of the Caricoa championship that season. He had a spell at Volta Redonda in 1976, and in 1978 he arrived at Joinville, where he was champion of the state league three times in a row.

After quick spells at SC Internacional and Cruzeiro EC, he returned to Joinville, becoming champion again in 1982. In 1983 he transferred to Palmeiras, the club where he became an idol and accumulated 261 appearances with 22 goals scored.

Also played for Botafogo, Guarani, Sport, Vila Nova-GO and Fluminense until arriving at Paraná Clube in 1990, being part of the first squad in the club's history.

== Death ==
On 14 April 1990, in the match Paraná Clube vs. Sport Campo Mourão, valid for 1990 Campeonato Paranaense, suffered a severe head collision during a ball dispute, causing him to leave the field immobilized and directly to the Hospital Evangélico, Curitiba. The diagnosis was cervical trauma and treatment was initiated. Two days later, he was medically discharged. Vágner returned to hospital a day later, feeling severe pain and vomiting. He was transferred directly to the ICU where he was diagnosed with cerebral ischemia. On 20 April 1990 Vágner died after multiple organ failure. The necrological examination pointed to a 180mm fracture of the left parieto-occipital bone of his skull, which resulted in severe cerebral edema.

== Honours ==
Joinville

- Campeonato Catarinense: 1978, 1979, 1980, 1982

== See also ==
- List of association football players who died during their careers
