= Roman Pavelka =

Czech footballer

- Pavelka with Atlantic Lázně Bohdaneč in 1996

Personal information
- Date of birth: 4 January 1968
- Date of death: 14 February 2001 (aged 33)
- Place of death: Uničov, Czech Republic
- Position: Midfielder

Senior career*
Years	Team	Apps	(Gls)
1988–1989	VTJ Tábor	6	(0)
1989–1992	FC Baník Ostrava	26	(6)
1993–1996	FC Petra Drnovice	29	(1)
1996–1999	AFK Atlantic Lázně Bohdaneč	70	(4)
1999–2001	SK Uničov		
- * Club domestic league appearances and goals

Roman Pavelka (4 January 1968 – 14 February 2001) was a Czech football midfielder. He had joined lower-league SK Uničov when collapsing during training and dying from a heart condition.

== See also ==
- List of association footballers who died while playing
