= Gulubane =

Coordinates: 20°55′S 27°19′E

Gulubane is a village in the northern part of Botswana in North East District.

The village has five wards:being Chume, Nkau, Nkhwa, Madwala, and Matshingitsi. It was founded in 1911. According to the Guide to the Villages of Botswana Gulubane had 123 dwellings and a population of 609. In 2013, it had a population of 897.
