= Héctor Sanabria (footballer, born 1985) =

Argentine footballer

Personal information
- Full name: Héctor Arnaldo Sanabria
- Date of birth: 29 August 1985
- Date of death: 27 August 2013 (aged 27)
- Position: Striker

Senior career*
Years	Team	Apps	(Gls)
2003–2005	Nueva Chicago		
2006	Flandria		
2007–2008	Deportivo Merlo		
2008–2010	Fénix		
2010–2011	Argentino		
2011–2012	Pérez Zeledón	37	(10)
2012–2013	Malacateco	31	(4)
2013	Laferrere		
- * Club domestic league appearances and goals

Héctor Arnaldo Sanabria (29 August 1985 – 27 August 2013) was an Argentine professional footballer who played as a striker.

== Career ==
Sanabria played for Nueva Chicago, Flandria, Deportivo Merlo, Fénix, Argentino, Pérez Zeledón, Malacateco and Laferrere.

== Later life and death ==
Sanabria died on 27 August 2013, at the age of 27, following a heart attack during a match.

== See also ==
- List of association footballers who died while playing
