= Cristian Gómez (footballer, born 1987) =

Argentine footballer

- Gómez with Deportivo Armenio

Personal information
- Full name: Cristian César Gómez
- Date of birth: 4 November 1987
- Date of death: 24 May 2015 (aged 27)
- Position: Defender

Senior career*
Years	Team	Apps	(Gls)
2009–2011	9 de Julio de Rafaela		
2012–2014	Deportivo Armenio	48	(1)
2014–2015	Sportivo Patria	14	(0)
2015	Atlético Paraná	14	(1)
Total		76	(2)
- * Club domestic league appearances and goals

Cristian César Gómez (4 November 1987 – 24 May 2015) was an Argentine professional footballer who played as a defender for 9 de Julio de Rafaela, Deportivo Armenio, Sportivo Patria and Atlético Paraná. He died during a game in May 2015 at the age of 27.
