= Gökmen Yıldıran =

Turkish footballer

Personal information
- Date of birth: 31 August 1978
- Place of birth: Istanbul, Turkey
- Date of death: 9 August 2006 (aged 27)
- Place of death: Elazığ, Turkey
- Position: Forward

Senior career*
Years	Team	Apps	(Gls)
1996–2000	MKE Ankaragücü	25	(0)
1997–1998	→ Diyarbakirspor (loan)	27	(5)
1998–1999	→ Vanspor (loan)	22	(8)
2000	→ Konya Endüstri (loan)	4	(1)
2000–2001	Saran Keskinspor	1	(1)
2000–2001	→ Altay (loan)	19	(3)
2001–2002	Altay	0	(0)
2001–2002	→ Adanaspor (loan)	26	(12)
2002–2004	Adanaspor	28	(5)
2004–2005	İstanbulspor	11	(0)
2005–2006	Elazığspor	20	(1)
Total		183	(36)

International career
1995–1996	Turkey U17	4	(4)
1996	Turkey U18	18	(6)
1999	Turkey U21	1	(1)
- * Club domestic league appearances and goals

Gökmen Yıldıran (31 August 1978 – 9 August 2006) was a Turkish footballer who played professionally in Turkey. He died after suffering a heart attack during training.

== Career statistics ==
=== Club ===
Nerdteam	Season	League			Cuplol		Continental		Other		Total	
Nerdteam	Season	Division	Apps	Goals	Apps	Goals	Apps	Goals	Apps	Goals	Apps	Goals
MKE Ankaragücü	1995–96	1.Lig	2	0	0	0	0	0	0	0	2	0
MKE Ankaragücü	1996–97	1.Lig	8	0	0	0	0	0	0	0	8	0
MKE Ankaragücü	1997–98	1.Lig	0	0	0	0	0	0	0	0	0	0
MKE Ankaragücü	1998–99	1.Lig	5	0	0	0	0	0	0	0	5	0
MKE Ankaragücü	1999–00	1.Lig	7	0	1 (Note: Appearances in the Turkish Cup)	0	0	0	0	0	8	0
MKE Ankaragücü	2000–01	1.Lig	3	0	0	0	0	0	0	0	3	0
MKE Ankaragücü	Total		25	0	1	0	0	0	0	0	26	0
Diyarbakirspor (loan)	1997–98	2.Lig	27	5	1	0	0	0	0	0	28	5
Vanspor (loan)	1998–99	2.Lig	22	8	0	0	0	0	0	0	22	8
Konya Endüstri (loan)	1999–00	2.Lig	4	1	0	0	0	0	0	0	4	1
Saran Keskinspor	2000–01	3.Lig	1	1	0	0	0	0	0	0	1	1
Altay (loan)	2000–01	2.Lig	19	3	1	0	0	0	0	0	20	3
Altay	2001–02	2.Lig	0	0	0	0	0	0	0	0	0	0
Adanaspor (loan)	2001–02	1.Lig	26	12	4	3	0	0	0	0	30	15
Adanaspor	2002–03	Süper Lig	16	4	1	0	0	0	0	0	17	4
Adanaspor	2003–04	Süper Lig	12	1	0	0	0	0	0	0	12	1
Adanaspor	Total		54	17	5	3	0	0	0	0	59	20
İstanbulspor	2004–05	Süper Lig	11	0	1	0	0	0	0	0	12	0
Elazığspor	2005–06	1.Lig	20	1	0	0	0	0	0	0	20	1
Career total			183	36	9	3	0	0	0	0	192	39

== See also ==
- List of association footballers who died while playing
