= Stefan Toleski =

Macedonian footballer

Personal information
- Date of birth: 13 August 1979
- Date of death: 12 December 2002 (aged 23)
- Height: 1.90 m (6 ft 3 in)
- Position: Defender

Senior career*
Years	Team	Apps	(Gls)
–2000	Sileks		
2000	Nagykanizsa	12	(1)
2000–2002	Napredok		
Total		12	(1)

International career
1996–1997	Macedonia U18	6	(0)
1998–1999	Macedonia U21	4	(0)
- * Club domestic league appearances and goals

Stefan Toleski (13 August 1979 – 12 December 2002) was a Macedonian footballer who played professionally for Hungarian side Nagykanizsa in 2000. He was a Macedonia youth international footballer. In December 2002, he suffered a fatal heart attack during a match against KF Milano Kumanovë.

== Career statistics ==
=== Club ===
Club	Season	League			Cup		Other		Total	
Club	Season	Division	Apps	Goals	Apps	Goals	Apps	Goals	Apps	Goals
Nagykanizsa	2000–01	Nemzeti Bajnokság I	12	1	0	0	0	0	12	1
Career total			12	1	0	0	0	0	12	1
