= David Oniya =

Nigerian footballer

David Faramola Oniya
- Oniya with FC Bukhara in 2012

Personal information
- Date of birth: 5 June 1985
- Place of birth: Lagos, Nigeria
- Date of death: 13 June 2015 (aged 30)
- Place of death: Kota Bharu, Kelantan, Malaysia
- Height: 5 ft 11 in (1.80 m)
- Position: Defender

Senior career*
Years	Team	Apps	(Gls)
2007–2011	Dinamo Samarqand	107	(6)
2011–2012	Bunyodkor	0	(0)
2012	Sogdiana Jizzakh		
2012–2013	Buxoro	37	(2)
2014	Neftchi Fergana	0	(0)
2014–2015	T–Team		
- * Club domestic league appearances and goals as of 18 September 2017 (UTC)

David Faramola Oniya (5 June 1985 – 13 June 2015) was a Nigerian footballer who played as a defender.

== Club career ==
In mid-2007, Oniya moved to Uzbekistan, signing a contract with Dinamo Samarqand. Oniya played for Dinamo Samarqand for 4 seasons, becoming the team's captain before signing for Bunyodkor in December 2011. Oniya left Bunyodkor in February 2012 before the start of the season, signing for Sogdiana Jizzakh for the first half of the year and then joined Buxoro in the summer of 2012.

In early 2014, Oniya signed for Neftchi Fergana, but did not pass a medical examination and therefore was not allowed to be registered by the Uzbekistan Football Federation. Oniya's contract with Neftchi Fergana was terminated in the summer of 2014. In the autumn of 2014 Oniya moved to Malaysia signing for T–Team.

== Death ==
On 13 June 2015, Oniya died after collapsing on the pitch in Malaysia during a friendly between his club T-Team and Kelantan. His body was laid to rest at a Christian cemetery in Seremban, Negeri Sembilan two weeks later.

== See also ==
- List of association footballers who died while playing
