= Billy Vigar =

English footballer (2003–2025)

- Vigar with Chichester City in 2025

Personal information
- Full name: William Joseph Vigar
- Date of birth: 22 October 2003
- Place of birth: Worthing, West Sussex, England
- Date of death: 25 September 2025 (aged 21)
- Place of death: England
- Position: Forward

Youth career
- 2017–2023: Arsenal
- 2023: → Derby County (loan)

Senior career*
Years	Team	Apps	(Gls)
2023–2024	Arsenal	0	(0)
2023–2024	→ Eastbourne Borough (loan)	32	(2)
2024–2025	Hastings United	10	(1)
2025	Chichester City	3	(2)
Total		45	(5)
- * Club domestic league appearances and goals

William Joseph Vigar (22 October 2003 – 25 September 2025) was an English professional footballer who played as a forward.

He began his football career with Hove Rivervale, a grassroots club based in Hove, Sussex, before joining Arsenal's youth academy. He also played at the youth level for Derby County. His senior career started in 2022, featuring spells with Eastbourne Borough and Hastings United before signing with Chichester City in 2025.

Vigar died on 25 September after suffering a wall collision by accident during an Isthmian League match on 20 September 2025.

== Early life and club career ==
=== Early life ===
William Joseph Vigar was born in Worthing, in 2003. He began his youth career with the grassroots club Hove Rivervale FC, after being scouted in his hometown in Hove, Sussex, scoring 17 goals in his first season. His performances led to a scholarship with Arsenal. He joined Arsenal's academy in December 2017, at the age of 14, during the 2020/21 season, alongside Charles Sagoe Jr., Remy Mitchell, and others including Omari Hutchinson, Charlie Patino, and Brook Norton-Cuffy. scoring four goals in 18 appearances. Billy went on to appear for the club in the PL2 and EFL Trophy.

In July 2022 he signed his first professional contract with the club but did not make a senior appearance.

=== Senior career ===
Vigar spent time on loan with Derby County's under-21s and Eastbourne Borough during his Arsenal spell. He scored his first senior goal on his loan debut for Eastbourne in the National League South on 5 August 2023, netting a diving header in a 1–0 home victory against Hampton & Richmond Borough. He made 37 appearances for Eastbourne in total.

After leaving Arsenal in 2024, he joined Hastings United and made 13 appearances in all competitions. Vigar moved to Chichester City in 2025 and made five appearances, scoring twice.

== Death ==
On 20 September 2025, Vigar accidentally collided with a concrete wall during an Isthmian League match against Wingate & Finchley and sustained a life-threatening brain injury. He was placed into a induced coma and received surgery, but died on 25 September.

=== Reaction and tributes ===
Vigar's death sparked widespread debate among fans and supporters in English football. The Professional Footballers' Association (PFA) called for an urgent review of ground safety standards in non-league football, focusing on brick and concrete structures near pitches, and pressed governing bodies to ensure such features do not create "unnecessary or avoidable risk" to players. Fans started a petition, known informally as "Vigar's Law", to ban hard walls and barriers next to touchlines at lower-league venues. Omari Hutchinson, Brooke Norton-Cuffy and Charlie Patino, his former teammates, also paid tribute to Vigar.

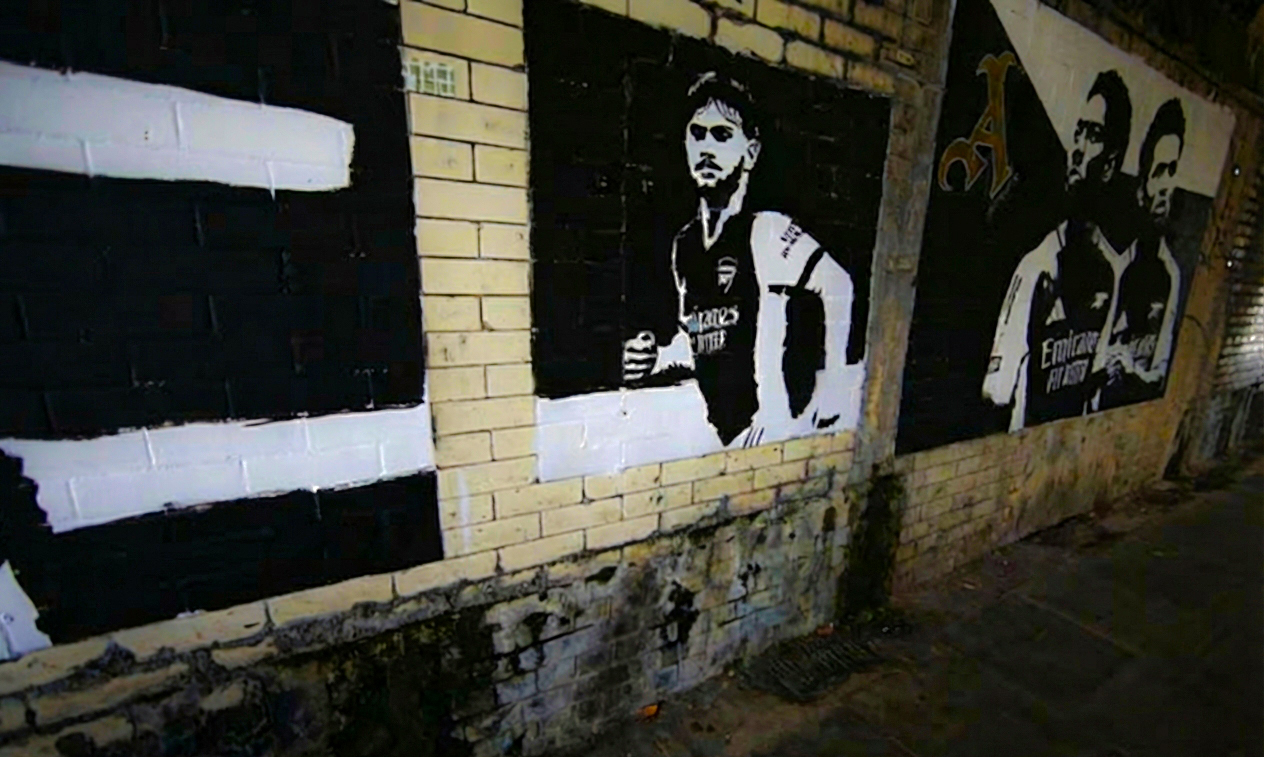
Tribute to Vigar outside of the Emirates Stadium.

Arsenal described him as "quick, powerful and fiercely determined". Chichester City postponed their next fixture, and tributes were paid across English football. Arsenal manager Mikel Arteta paid tribute, describing the news as "shocking" and stating that his immediate thoughts were with Vigar's family. Worthing, Horsham, Brighton & Hove Albion, Portsmouth, Havant & Waterlooville and several other football clubs posted tributes to Vigar. On 1 October 2025, Arsenal paid tribute to Vigar during their UEFA Champions League group stage match against Olympiacos, with players wearing black armbands in his honour. Martin Ødegaard, Arsenal player and captain, stated "Vigar will always remain part of the Arsenal family."

On 26 September 2025, the Isthmian League paid tribute to Vigar, announcing that a minute's silence would be observed before matches that weekend, with players also wearing black armbands in his memory.

The Football Association expressed its condolences and faced calls to conduct a broader safety review following the incident. On 26 September, it announced that it would undertake a review of pitch perimeter safety. The Secretary of State for Culture, Media and Sport Lisa Nandy said that a safety review would be carried out. A review was previously advocated for. Following a previous similar incident, in 2023 the PFA and Stuart Andrew, the Parliamentary Under-Secretary of State for Sport, Media, Civil Society and Youth, wrote to the Premier League, the EFL and the National League calling on them to proactively review pitch perimeter safety but this did not take place.

Sholing FC called on the Football Association to establish a dedicated fund to enable clubs to carry out “urgent” safety work at their grounds following the death of Vigar, stating that unsafe perimeter walls and fences were present at many non-league stadiums.

In October 2025, Chichester City manager, Miles Rutherford said that following Vigar's death he had considered ending his football career but that Vigar's family had made everyone come together and persevere as a team. Later in October, Wingate & Finchley said that the concrete wall with which Vigar had collided had since been demolished.

Eastbourne Borough announced in October that the gate receipts from their Sussex Senior Cup game against Chichester City on 28 October would be donated to the London Air Ambulance who had airlifted Vigar to hospital following his injury.

=== Aftermath ===
On 7 August 2026, the English Football Association announced a ban on solid perimeter walls surrounding pitches, following a review by independent health and safety experts. The ban applies from the start of the 2026–27 season in the National League and Women's National League systems. Funding for the removal of banned walls will be provided by the FA and Premier League.

== Career statistics ==
Appearances and goals by club, season and competition
Club	Season	League			National cup		League cup		Total	
Club	Season	Division	Apps	Goals	Apps	Goals	Apps	Goals	Apps	Goals
Arsenal	2022–23	Premier League	0	0	0	0	0	0	0	0
Eastbourne Borough (loan)	2023–24	National League South	32	2	0	0	0	0	32	2
Hastings United	2024–25	Isthmian League	10	1	0	0	0	0	10	1
Chichester City	2025–26	Isthmian League	3	2	0	0	0	0	3	2
Career total			45	5	5	3	0	0	45	5
