= Jaouad Akaddar =

Moroccan footballer (1984–2012)

Personal information
- Full name: Jaouad Akaddar
- Date of birth: 9 September 1984
- Place of birth: Khouribga, Morocco
- Date of death: 20 October 2012 (aged 28)
- Place of death: Agadir, Morocco
- Position: Forward

Youth career
- ?–2003: Olympique Khouribga

Senior career*
Years	Team	Apps	(Gls)
2003–2006	Olympique Khouribga		
2006–2007	Al-Ahli		
2007–2009	FAR Rabat		
2009–2010	Moghreb Tétouan		
2010	Ahly Tripoli		
2010–2012	Al-Raed		
2012	FAR Rabat		
2012	Hassania Agadir		

International career^{‡}
2003	Morocco	1	(0)
- * Club domestic league appearances and goals as of April 16, 2009 ‡ National team caps and goals as of 22 November 2020

Jaouad Akaddar (Arabic: جواد أقدار; September 9, 1984 – October 20, 2012) was a Moroccan footballer. Jaouad died on 20 October 2012 after a heart attack immediately after the end of a match.

== Club career ==
Akaddar played for Olympique Khouribga, FAR Rabat and Moghreb Tétouan before going abroad with Ahly Tripoli and Al-Raed.

== International career ==
Akaddar represented the Morocco national team once in a 1-0 2004 African Cup of Nations qualification win over Equatorial Guinea on 6 July 2003.

== See also ==
- List of association footballers who died while playing
