= Mohamed Abdelwahab =

Egyptian footballer (1983–2006)

- Abdelwahab with the Egypt national football team

Personal information
- Date of birth: 1 October 1983
- Place of birth: Faiyum, Egypt
- Date of death: 31 August 2006 (aged 22)
- Place of death: Cairo, Egypt
- Height: 1.74 m (5 ft 9 in)
- Position: Left back

Senior career*
Years	Team	Apps	(Gls)
2001–2003	Aluminium Nag Hammâdi		
2003	Al Dhafra Club		
2003–2004	ENPPI		
2004–2006	Al Ahly	26	(3)

International career
2004–2006	Egypt	19	(1)
- * Club domestic league appearances and goals

Mohamed Mohamed Abdelwahab (Arabic: مُحَمَّد مُحَمَّد عَبْد الْوَهَّاب, 1 October 1983 – 31 August 2006) was an Egyptian footballer. He played in the defensive left back position. He was an important part of the Egyptian squad that went on to win the 2006 African Cup of Nations. He died during training with his club Al Ahly on 31 August 2006.

== Early life and career ==
Abdelwahab was born in the rural town of Faiyum. He began his professional career with Aluminium Nag Hammâdi and whilst there caught the eye of then national youth team coach Hassan Shehata, who included him in his squad. Abdelwahab went on to be part of the Egyptian youth team that won the 2003 African Cup of Nations in Mali.

His excellent form in the World Youth Championship in the United Arab Emirates encouraged UAE side Al Dhafra Club to sign him on a four-year-contract. However, Abdelwahab did not make any appearances at Al Dhafra Club and spent his first year on-loan to ENPPI. Whilst there, he was called up to the Egyptian national team by Italian coach Marco Tardelli. Abdelwahab scored on his debut in the national team's opening 2006 World Cup qualifier against Sudan.

He then joined El Ahly on a two-year loan but failed to secure a starting place in his first season with the club since coach Manuel José depended mainly on Angolan international Gilberto. Abdelwahab's break came in the 2005 African Champions League final against Etoile Sahel of Tunisia when Gilberto left the pitch injured after ten minutes. Abdelwahab was brought on and went on to set up Osama Hosny for El-Ahly's second goal in the 3–0 win that saw the club crowned African champions.

Abdelwahab became a pivotal member of Hassan Shehata's national squad and helped Egypt win the 2006 African Cup of Nations on home soil by scoring the second penalty in the penalty shootout against Ivory Coast. His steady performances helped Al Ahly secure their second consecutive local title, the Egyptian Cup and CAF Super Cup in the same season.

Ahly then moved to land Abdelwahab on a permanent basis from Al Dhafra Club, who turned down the offer. However, a clause in the player's contract with the UAE side allowed him to annul it and sign for Ahly, triggering a tug-of-war between Al Ahly and Al Dhafra and leaving the player inactive for the entire summer, causing him to lose his place in the national side. FIFA had still not determined the outcome of the disagreement when he died on 31 August 2006.

== Death ==
Abdelwahab collapsed during Ahly's morning training session on 31 August 2006. He was rushed to 'Egypt International Hospital' in Dokki, Cairo, but the 22-year-old winger died before he could be revived. According to Egyptian doctors, the cause of Abdelwhab's death was a heart defect. National coach Hassan Shehata and the players traveled to Abdelwahab's hometown, Faiyum, to attend the funeral proceedings.

== See also ==
- List of association footballers who died while playing
