= Jacobo Urso =

Argentinian footballer (1899–1922)

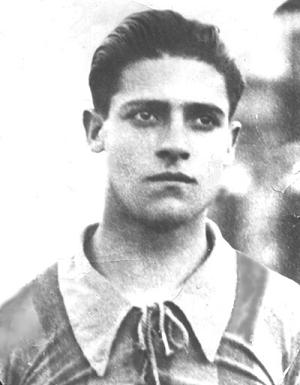

Personal information
- Date of birth: 17 April 1899
- Place of birth: Dolores, Argentina
- Date of death: 6 August 1922 (aged 23)
- Place of death: Buenos Aires, Argentina
- Position: Midfielder

Youth career
- 1915: San Lorenzo

Senior career*
Years	Team	Apps	(Gls)
1916–1922	San Lorenzo	136	(8)

International career
1919	Argentina		
- * Club domestic league appearances and goals

Jacobo Urso (17 April 1899 – 6 August 1922) was an Argentine footballer who played as left midfielder. He died from an injury suffered in a match with San Lorenzo de Almagro, the only club where he played during his short career.

Despite his short career and not having won any titles with his club, Urso is regarded by San Lorenzo supporters as one of the greatest players in the history of the club. He was also the first San Lorenzo player to be called up for the Argentina national team.

== Club career ==
Son (out of 12) of Italian immigrants, Urso was born in Dolores, a town in Buenos Aires Province in 1899. He moved to the capital city at an early age. He joined club Alba at 12 years old, and joined San Lorenzo (that had promoted to Primera División one year before) in 1915 to play in the third division, debuting in the upper division one year later, on 7 May 1916 in a match against Estudiantes de La Plata. That day was also the first match held in Estadio Gasómetro on Avenida La Plata.

Some of Urso's teammates were also founders of the club (such as Federico Monti and Luis Gianella) during his first years in San Lorenzo, and other players that would become key footballers such as Luis Monti and Alfredo Carricaberry.

On Sunday 30 July 1922 in the 13th round of the 1922 Argentine Primera División organised by dissident Asociación Amateurs, San Lorenzo played against Estudiantes de Buenos Aires in Palermo. In the 55th. minute, Urso and Estudiantes player Comolli went for the ball in the midfield zone, where Comolli poked Urso on his side. The collision caused Urso to lay on the field with visible signs of pain.

Nevertheless, Urso refused to leave the field, since substitutions were not allowed at that time, and keep playing. Despite the situation he did not want to abandon the match, playing the rest of the game until the referee ended the match. After the match, Urso was hospitalized in Hospital Ramos Mejía. The doctors diagnosed he had two broken ribs and a kidney drilled by one of the ribs. The kidney was so damaged that it had to be removed via surgery. Urso was operated on twice during his stay at the hospital.

Despite the seriousness of the injury, Urso did not blame Comolli, stating that "the injuries were accidental and unintentional as ill-intentioned people want to make out", words during an interview with local newspepers conducted on 4 August.

After a brief improvement in his health, on Sunday 6 Urso's condition worsened, and he died at 18:05.

== International career ==
Urso was the first San Lorenzo player to be called for the Argentina national team (represented by players from Asociación Amateurs) in 1919.

== Legacy ==
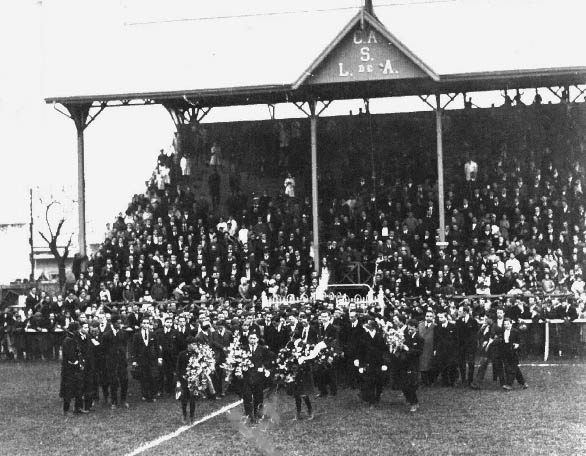
The coffin with Urso's body being honored at Viejo Gasómetro Stadium before being carried to Chacarita Cemetery

Once Urso's death was made public, the executive committee of San Lorenzo decided to pay for the burial and funeral, which was carried out at the club's headquarters.

His body laid for viewing in his house on 811 Beauchef street, then the coffin was taken to the stadium where his teammates, executives, and players of Czechoslovak team Teplitzer FK (which was then touring South America) honored him on the field. After that, near 5,000 people escorted the coffin to Cementerio del Oeste where it was buried.

Urso's body was exhumed and cremated years later, and the ashes were carried to the San Lorenzo Museum (named after him), located at Estadio Pedro Bidegain, following his family’s wishes. Aside from his mortal remains, Urso's member card and the flag that covered his coffin during the funeral are also exhibited at the museum.

Three months after his death, on 8 November 1922, "Club Atlético Jacobo Urso" was established in Saladillo, after receiving permission from San Lorenzo. The club participated in the foundations of both football leagues in the city (1926 and 1931) and is still active.

Urso has been regarded as a sort of "martyr" by San Lorenzo supporters, who praised his love for the team and his having literally "died for the club" on the field, a metaphorical expression frequently used in Argentine football, which in this case became real.
