= Granja, Ceará =

Municipality in Ceará, Brazil

Granja
- Flag Coat of arms

- Location of Granja in Ceará
- Coordinates: 03°07′12″S 40°49′33″W
- Country: Brazil
- Region: Northeast
- State: Ceará
- Founded: 1776

Government
  - Mayor: Francisco Geovane da Rocha Brito

Area
  - Total: 2,697.202 km^{2} (1,041.396 sq mi)
- Elevation: 10 m (33 ft)

Population (2020)
  - Total: 54,962
  - Density: 19.9/km^{2} (52/sq mi)
- Time zone: UTC−3 (BRT)
- HDI (2000): 0.554 – medium

Granja is the westernmost municipality in the Brazilian state of Ceará.

The municipality contains part of the 1,592,550 hectares (3,935,300 acres) Serra da Ibiapaba Environmental Protection Area, created in 1996.
