= Hugo Cunha =

Portuguese footballer

- Cunha with União Leiria in 2004

Personal information
- Full name: Hugo Filipe da Silva Cunha
- Date of birth: 18 February 1977
- Place of birth: Barreiro, Portugal
- Date of death: 25 June 2005 (aged 28)
- Place of death: Montemor-o-Novo, Portugal
- Height: 1.78 m (5 ft 10 in)
- Position: Midfielder

Youth career
- 1988–1991: Barreirense
- 1991–1992: Quimigal
- 1992–1995: Barreirense

Senior career*
| Years | Team | Apps | (Gls) |
| 1995–1999 | Barreirense | 98 | (21) |
| 1999–2000 | Campomaiorense | 25 | (2) |
| 2000–2004 | Vitória Guimarães | 85 | (5) |
| 2004–2005 | União Leiria | 15 | (0) |
| Total | | 223 | (28) |
- * Club domestic league appearances and goals

Hugo Filipe da Silva Cunha (18 February 1977 – 25 June 2005) was a Portuguese professional footballer who played as a midfielder.

Over the course of six seasons, he amassed Primeira Liga totals of 125 games and seven goals. He died at the age of 28 due to cardiac arrest.

== Club career ==
Born in Barreiro, Setúbal District, Cunha began his career at local club F.C. Barreirense, as a youth and an early senior. He made his professional debut with modest S.C. Campomaiorense in the Primeira Liga, moving to Vitória de Guimarães at the end of a sole season.

After four years in Minho being regularly used by the first team, although rarely as a starter, Cunha signed with fellow top-division U.D. Leiria for 2004–05. In the following off-season, he died suddenly during a football match played with friends in Montemor-o-Novo, aged 28.

== See also ==
- List of association footballers who died while playing
