= Pedro Berruezo =

Spanish footballer

Personal information
- Full name: Pedro Berruezo Martín
- Date of birth: 22 May 1945
- Place of birth: Melilla, Spain
- Date of death: 7 January 1973 (aged 27)
- Place of death: Clínica Domínguez, Pontevedra, Spain
- Height: 1.69 m (5 ft 7 in)
- Position: Forward

Senior career*
Years	Team	Apps	(Gls)
1964–1968	CD Málaga	44	(18)
1968–1973	Sevilla	122	(34)
Total		166	(52)

International career
	Spain U23	2	
- * Club domestic league appearances and goals

Pedro Berruezo Martín (22 May 1945 – 7 January 1973) was a Spanish footballer who represented CD Málaga and Sevilla. Having already collapsed in games against Alicante, Sabadell and Barakaldo, Berruezo suffered a fatal heart attack during a match against Pontevedra on 7 January 1973.

== Career statistics ==
=== Club ===
Club	Season	League			Cup		Continental		Other		Total	
Club	Season	Division	Apps	Goals	Apps	Goals	Apps	Goals	Apps	Goals	Apps	Goals
CD Málaga	1964–65	Segunda División	10	4	1	0	–		1 (Note: Appearances in the Segunda División promotion playoffs)	1	12	5
CD Málaga	1965–66	La Liga	1	0	4	3	–		1 (Note: Appearances in the La Liga relegation playoffs)	0	6	3
CD Málaga	1966–67	Segunda División	16	9	3	1	–		0	0	19	10
CD Málaga	1967–68	La Liga	17	5	0	0	–		0	0	17	5
CD Málaga	Total		44	18	8	4	0	0	2	1	54	23
Sevilla	1967–68	La Liga	0	0	2	4	–		0	0	2	4
Sevilla	1968–69	Segunda División	25	11	0	0	–		0	0	25	11
Sevilla	1969–70	La Liga	28	9	2	0	–		0	0	30	9
Sevilla	1970–71	La Liga	24	1	5	1	2 (Note: Appearances in the Inter-Cities Fairs Cup)	0	0	0	31	2
Sevilla	1971–72	La Liga	28	5	2	0	–		0	0	30	5
Sevilla	1972–73	Segunda División	17	8	0	0	–		0	0	17	8
Sevilla	Total		122	34	11	5	2	0	0	0	135	39
Career total			166	52	19	9	2	0	2	1	189	62
