= John Kirkby (soccer) =

American soccer player (1929–1953)

Personal information
- Full name: John Kirkby
- Date of birth: 29 November 1929
- Place of birth: Chicago, Illinois, U.S.
- Date of death: 4 April 1953 (aged 23)
- Place of death: Wrexham, Wales
- Position: Defender

Senior career*
Years	Team	Apps	(Gls)
1948–1949	Stoke City	1	(0)
1951–1953	Wrexham	5	(0)
- * Club domestic league appearances and goals

John Kirkby (29 November 1929 – 4 April 1953) was an American soccer player who played in the Football League for Stoke City and Wrexham.

== Career ==
Kirkby became Stoke City's first overseas player, having been born in the United States, when he played his only game for Stoke against Middlesbrough in April 1949. He joined Wrexham in 1951. In a Cheshire County League match versus Crewe Alexandra Reserves on 4 April 1953, Kirkby collapsed in the 65th minute and was declared dead upon arrival in the hospital.

== Career statistics ==
Club	Season	Division	League		FA Cup		Total	
Club	Season	Division	Apps	Goals	Apps	Goals	Apps	Goals
Stoke City	1948–49	First Division	1	0	0	0	1	0
Wrexham	1951–52	Third Division North	2	0	0	0	2	0
Wrexham	1952–53	Third Division North	3	0	0	0	3	0
Career Total			6	0	0	0	6	0
