= Rasmus Green =

Danish footballer (1980–2006)

- Green with Næstved in 2006

Personal information
- Date of birth: 9 April 1980
- Place of birth: Denmark
- Date of death: 12 June 2006 (aged 26)
- Place of death: Næstved, Denmark
- Height: 1.79 m (5 ft 10 1/2 in)
- Position: Midfielder

Youth career
- Brøndby
- AB

Senior career*
Years	Team	Apps	(Gls)
2000–2003	AB	37	(1)
2003–2005	Ølstykke	65	(10)
2005–2006	Næstved	4	(0)
Total		106	(11)
- * Club domestic league appearances and goals

Rasmus Green (9 April 1980 – 12 June 2006) was a Danish professional footballer who played for Brøndby, AB, Ølstykke FC and Næstved BK. Green died on 12 June 2006 on the Næstved training pitch.
