= Endurance Idahor =

Nigerian footballer

- Endurance Idahor with Al Merrikh SC

Personal information
- Full name: Endurance Idahor
- Date of birth: 4 August 1984
- Place of birth: Edo, Nigeria
- Date of death: 6 March 2010 (aged 25)
- Place of death: Omdurman, Sudan
- Height: 1.75 m (5 ft 9 in)
- Position: Striker

Senior career*
Years	Team	Apps	(Gls)
2001–2003	Igbino Babes		
2003–2004	Julius Berger		
2004	Gạch Đồng Tâm Long An		
2004–2005	Dolphins		
2006–2010	Al-Merreikh	62	(46)
2008	→ Al Nasr (loan)	11	(5)

International career^{‡}
2003-2005	Nigeria U23		
- * Club domestic league appearances and goals as of 14:59, 7 March 2010 (UTC) ‡ National team caps and goals as of 14:59, 7 March 2010 (UTC)

Endurance Idahor (4 August 1984 – 6 March 2010) was a Nigerian professional football player who played for Sudanese club Al-Merreikh. On 6 March 2010, Idahor collapsed during a league game and later died on his way to the hospital.

== Career ==
In 2003, Idahor tied for the Nigeria Premier League scoring title with 12 goals for Julius Berger and moved in 2005 to Dolphins FC. On 23 February 2006, Idahor left Dolphins and moved to Sudanese club Al-Merrikh, he was sent out on loan to Emirati club Al Nasr in January 2008 for 7 months. During his return he became a key player in the first team squad, becoming the top scorer and leading the club to their first CAF Confederation Cup final since 1989. Idahor has also played for the U-23 Nigeria national football team.

He collapsed in a match after a minor collision with other player and died on the way to a hospital.

== See also ==
- List of footballers who died while playing
