= Bobsam Elejiko =

Nigerian footballer

Bob Elejiko
- Bobsam Elejiko with Westerlo

Personal information
- Full name: Bobsam Elejiko
- Date of birth: 18 August 1981
- Place of birth: Lagos, Nigeria
- Date of death: 13 November 2011 (aged 30)
- Place of death: Merksem, Belgium
- Height: 1.89 m (6 ft 2 in)
- Position: Centre back

Youth career
- Stationary Stores
- 1999–2000: Málaga

Senior career*
Years	Team	Apps	(Gls)
2000–2001	Wacker Nordhausen		
2001–2003	Turnhout	42	(0)
2003–2007	Westerlo	71	(2)
2007–2008	Royal Antwerp	32	(0)
2008	S.C. Beira-Mar		
2009	Deinze		
2009–2010	Red Star Waasland		
2011	K. Merksem S.C.		
- * Club domestic league appearances and goals as of 16:00, 18 August 2007 (UTC)

Bobsam 'Bob' Elejiko (18 August 1981 – 13 November 2011) was a Nigerian footballer. He played as a central defender for several domestic teams between 2000 and 2011 before his death on the field during a football match.

== Career ==
During his career, spent almost exclusively in Belgium, Elejiko represented FSV Wacker 90 Nordhausen, K.V. Turnhout, K.V.C. Westerlo, Royal Antwerp FC, S.C. Beira-Mar, K.M.S.K. Deinze, K.V. Red Star Waasland and K. Merksem S.C..

In 2008, he had trials with FC Carl Zeiss Jena, Crewe Alexandra, Gillingham and RBC Roosendaal, but did not gain a contract with any club.

== Death ==
Elejiko collapsed while playing a fifth-tier match with his team K. Merksem S.C. against F.C. Kaart, a team from Merksem, Antwerp, on 13 November 2011. Despite resuscitation attempts pitch side, Elejiko was pronounced dead and the match was abandoned. The cause was later determined to be a traumatic rupture of the aorta.
