= Trackday trophy =

The Trackday Trophy was created by MotorSport Vision to specifically cater for trackday enthusiasts wanting to go racing. It was launched in early 2010, and was run as a series with trophies being awarded at each round, rather than a championship with trophies awarded at the end of the season.

== Organisers ==
Club MSV is one of the largest trackday operators in the UK. It offers various car and bike trackdays, for a range of experience levels, at parent company MotorSport Vision's circuits: Brands Hatch, Oulton Park, Snetterton and Cadwell Park.

== The Series ==
The Trackday Trophy is a novice race series that originated in 2010 to give trackday drivers the opportunity to go racing.

Cars must be fully compliant with MSA regulations (roll cage, fire extinguisher and cut off switches) but the relaxed regulations allow drivers who have already developed cars for trackdays to take part. Races are designed for teams of two drivers and classes are determined on a power-to-weight ratio. Each event consists of 30 minutes practice/qualifying, followed by a 45-minute race both of which will take place on one day. Teams must contain at least one novice driver who has competed in less than six races before. Experienced racers are permitted to race with a novice co-driver and solo entries are also acceptable from novices.

== First year ==
Following its launch, the Trackday Trophy targeted key media outlets to help promote the new series. Autosport's Marcus Pye gave the series a glowing tribute. Such articles helped the series build a small but strong following, with its end of season finale at Brands Hatch seeing grids of more than 20 cars.

== 2011 ==
For 2011, the Trackday Trophy continued its media push, with Evo Magazine running a competition to compete in the series. The series also drew excitement after confirming it would be one of the first categories to run on the new Snetterton 300 circuit.
