= High Performance Driver Education =

High Performance Driver Education (HPDE) refers to driving schools held on dedicated race tracks designed to teach drivers proper high-speed driving techniques. HPDE events are held by various automobile enthusiasts' clubs at some of the most renowned road-course tracks around the world. Participants include both students and instructors. Students are grouped according to their ability and experience, with "Novice Group" students being the least experienced, "Intermediate Group" being more experienced and "Advanced Group" drivers being the most experienced. Some organizations permit advanced students to drive the racetrack without a ride-along instructor. Mandatory classroom instruction contributes to the overall learning experience and allows peer-group discussions of event logistics, on-track performance and track characteristics.

HPDE events are not racing. Cars on-track operate under strict "rules of engagement" which minimize the likelihood of dangerous encounters with other cars. Occasional off-track excursions into the grass are normally controlled stops, with track personnel and on-board instructors supervising a safe re-entry onto the track. Passing among participants is facilitated only within defined "passing zones", and then only with clear hand signals and instructor confirmation. Many organizations increase the number of passing zones or eliminate the requirement for signals in groups with more experienced students to reduce traffic on track.

HPDEs encourage participants to drive within their ability and improve their car-control skills with each event. Instructors and staff evaluate each student's progress throughout the weekend, and make recommendations on the student's advancement through higher skilled driver groups. It is important for Novice drivers to learn the basic safety measures of the sport first such as entering the track, flags, corner worker functions and emergency procedures.

Some basic things for all novice drivers to learn include:

- Track Safety
- HPDE terminology
- Proper seat and hand position
- Looking ahead
- Straight line braking
- Brake point
- Turn in point
- Apex
- Track out point
- Understeer and oversteer

Although the majority of participants utilize a performance vehicle, students are allowed to drive virtually any vehicle that has been deemed safe by a qualified mechanic and is known to have adequate handling characteristics for track use. Most schools require convertibles to have an approved rollbar. Some factory installed rollbars are not approved for track use. Factory-installed 3-point seatbelts and approved helmets are the minimum safety restraint system allowed. Safety Helmets with a Snell Memorial Foundation rating of "M" (motorcycle - not fire retardant) are required for some schools but most will require "SA" (speciality application - fire retardant) ratings, with the helmet specification being no older than 10 years (example: Rating SA-2000 helmets would normally be valid for HPDE events through the year 2010). The Snell Foundation normally releases upgraded helmet standards every five years.

Some HPDE events also include a "Time Trial" segment where experienced students who have been "signed off" to drive without an instructor compete for fastest lap times. Time Trials are also conducted under strict rules which maximize safety and in many cases require additional safety equipment such as roll bars or fire extinguishers.

Requirements for HPDE events vary greatly from organization to organization, some being more strict than others regarding safety equipment, evaluation of driver skill, and vehicles allowed to participate.

== See also ==
- Track day
- Auto racing

== Bibliography ==
- Tips and Info for your first HPDE Event by Chin Motorsports
- NOVICE Driver Tips and Recommendations by William Neal
- High Performance Driving Event
- Watkins Glen Int'l Niagara PCA HPDE Experience
