= Auto racing =

Motorsport involving the racing of cars for competition

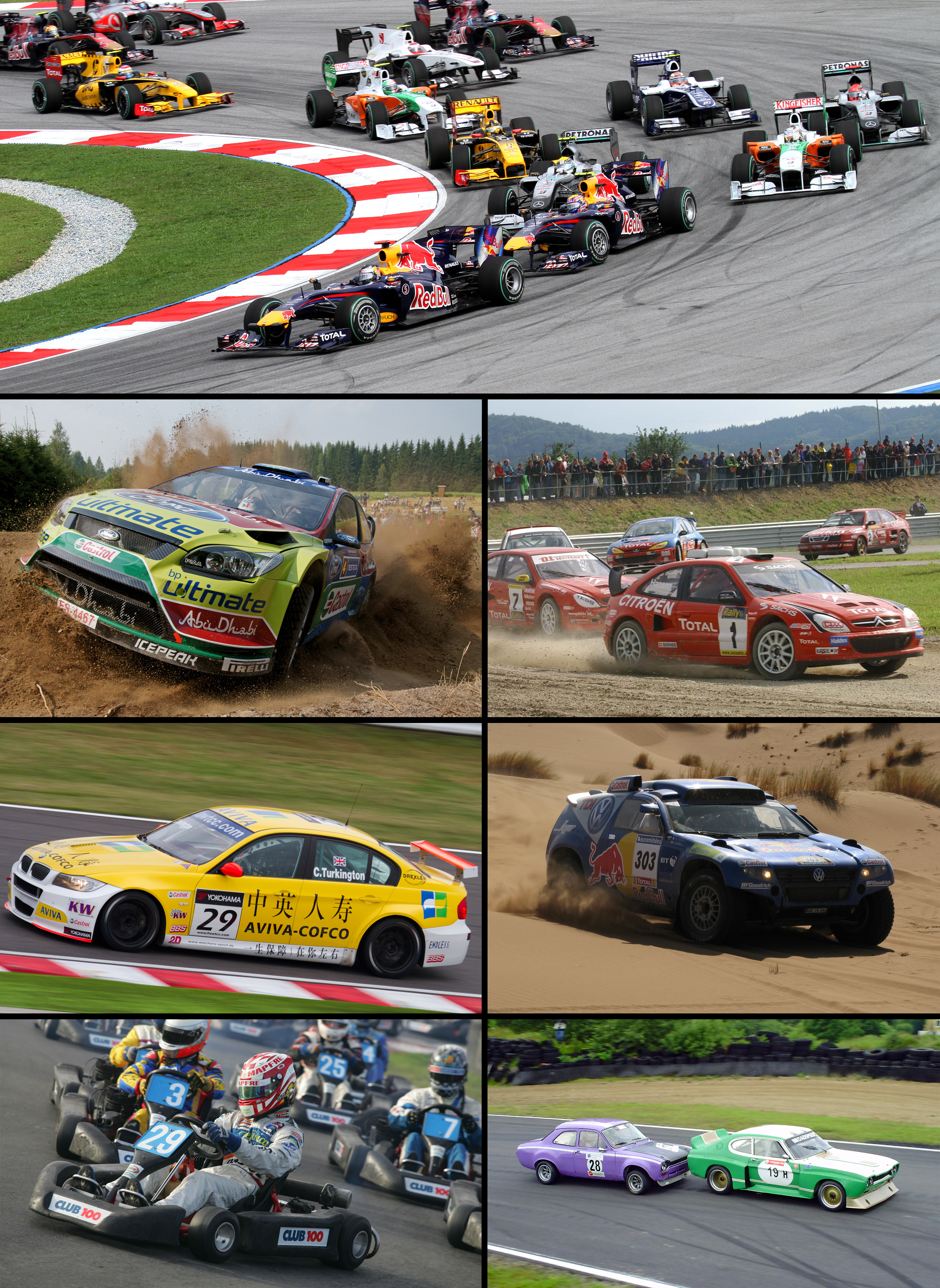
- Modalities of auto racing
- Highest governing body: FIA
- First contested: August 30, 1867; 159 years ago

Characteristics
- Mixed-sex: Yes
- Type: Outdoor and indoor

Presence
- Olympic: 1900 Summer Olympics (demonstration only)

Auto racing (also known as car racing, motor racing, or automobile racing) is a motorsport involving the racing of automobiles for competition. In North America, the term is commonly used to describe all forms of automobile sport including non-racing disciplines.

Auto racing has existed since the invention of the automobile. Races of various types were organized, with the first recorded as early as 1867. Many of the earliest events were effectively reliability trials, aimed at proving these new machines were a practical mode of transport, but soon became an important way for automobile makers to demonstrate their machines. By the 1930s, specialist racing cars had developed.

There are now numerous different categories, each with different rules and regulations.

== History ==
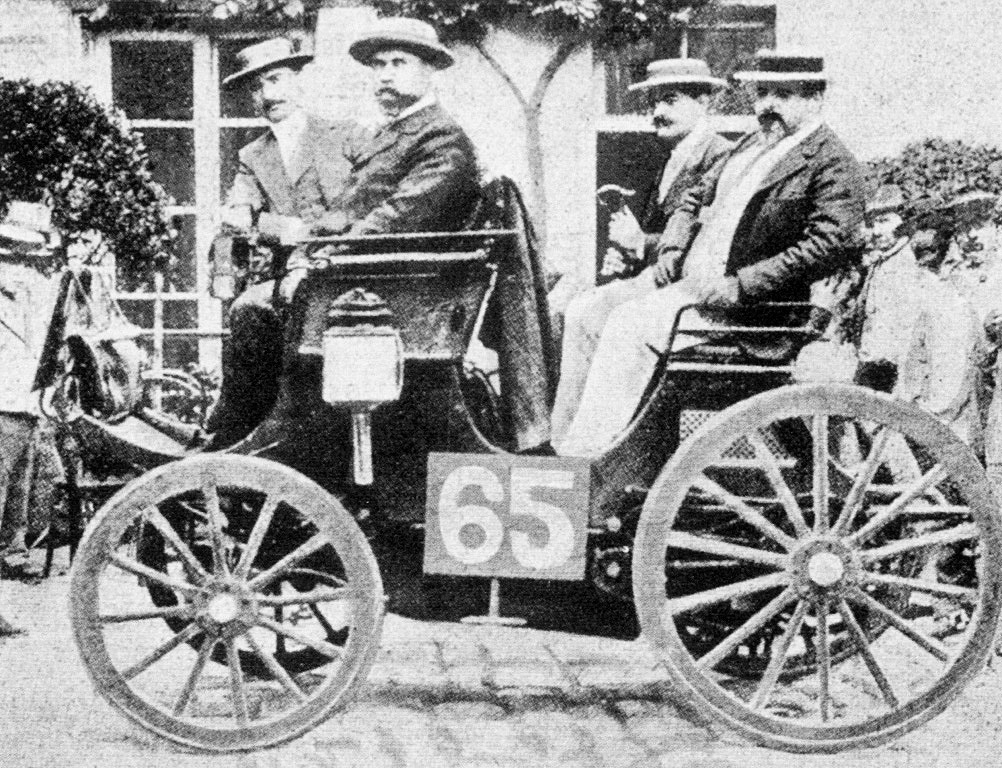
Albert Lemaître classified first in his Peugeot Type 5 3hp in the Paris–Rouen.

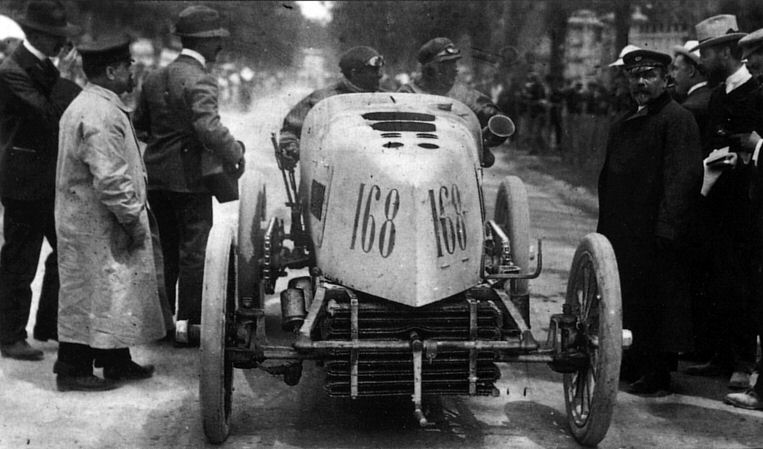
Fernand Gabriel driving a Mors in Paris-Madrid 1903

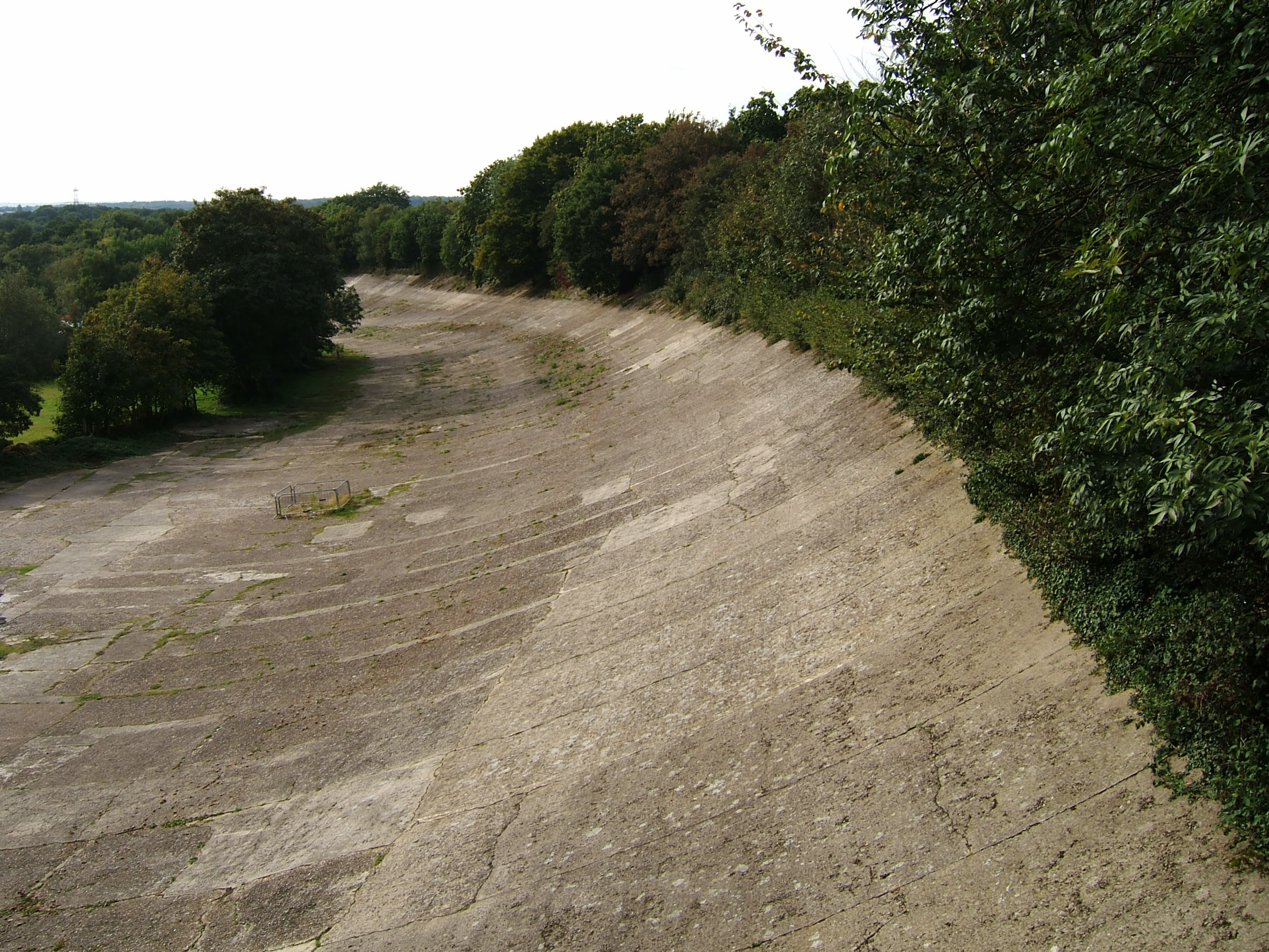
A remaining section of the Brooklands track in 2007

The first prearranged match race of two self-powered road vehicles over a prescribed route occurred at 4:30 A.M. on August 30, 1867, between Ashton-under-Lyne and Old Trafford, England, a distance of 8 mi (13 km). It was won by the carriage of Isaac Watt Boulton.

Internal combustion auto racing events began soon after the construction of the first successful gasoline-fueled automobiles. The first organized contest was on April 28, 1887, by the chief editor of Paris publication Le Vélocipède, Monsieur Fossier. It ran 2 kilometres (1.2 mi) from Neuilly Bridge to the Bois de Boulogne.

On July 22, 1894, the Parisian magazine Le Petit Journal organized what is considered to be the world's first motoring competition, from Paris to Rouen. One hundred and two competitors paid a 10-franc entrance fee.

The first American automobile race is generally considered to be the Thanksgiving Day Chicago Times-Herald race of November 28, 1895. Press coverage of the event first aroused significant American interest in the automobile.

The Targa Florio was an open road endurance automobile race held in the mountains of Sicily, Italy near the island's capital of Palermo. Founded in 1906, it was the oldest sports car racing event, part of the World Sportscar Championship between 1955 and 1973, and it was discontinued in 1977.

The oldest surviving sports car racing event is the 24 Hours of Le Mans, begun in 1923. It is run by the Automobile Club of the West (ACO). Team Ferrari won the race in 2023.

With auto construction and racing dominated by France, the French automobile club ACF staged a number of major international races, usually from or to Paris, connecting with another major city, in France or elsewhere in Europe.

Aspendale Racecourse, in Australia, was the world's first purpose-built motor racing circuit, opening in January 1906. The pear-shaped track was close to a mile in length, with slightly banked curves and a gravel surface of crushed cement.

Brooklands, in Surrey, England, was the first purpose-built 'banked' motor racing venue, opening in June 1907. It featured a 4.43 km (2.75 mi) concrete track with high-speed banked corners.

One of the oldest existing purpose-built and still in use automobile race course in the United States is the 2.5-mile-long (4.0 km) Indianapolis Motor Speedway in Speedway, Indiana. It is the largest capacity sports venue of any variety worldwide, with a top capacity of some 257,000+ seated spectators.

NASCAR was founded by Bill France Sr. on February 21, 1948, with the help of several other drivers. The first NASCAR "Strictly Stock" race was held on June 19, 1949, at Daytona Beach, Florida, U.S..

From 1962, sports cars temporarily took a back seat to GT cars, with the Fédération Internationale de l'Automobile (FIA) replacing the World Championship for Sports Cars with the International Championship for GT Manufacturers.

From 1962 through 2003, NASCAR's premier series was called the Winston Cup Series, sponsored by R. J. Reynolds Tobacco Company cigarette brand Winston. The changes that resulted from RJR's involvement, as well as the reduction of the schedule from 56 to 34 races a year, established 1972 as the beginning of NASCAR's "modern era".

The IMSA GT Series evolved into the American Le Mans Series, which ran its first season in 1998. The European races eventually became the closely related European Le Mans Series, both of which mix prototypes and GTs.

Turismo Carretera (TC) is a popular touring car racing series in Argentina, and one of the oldest car racing series still active in the world. The first TC competition took place in 1931 with 12 races, each in a different province. Future Formula One star Juan Manuel Fangio (Chevrolet) won the 1940 and 1941 editions of the TC. It was during this time that the series' Chevrolet-Ford rivalry began, with Ford acquiring most of its historical victories.

The industry, much like the cars it champions, has had to navigate through a global pandemic and a persistent chip shortage, each threatening to derail production schedules. There is also a growing number of events for electric racing cars, such as the Formula E, the Eco Grand Prix or the Electric GT Championship.

== Categories ==
=== Open-wheel racing ===
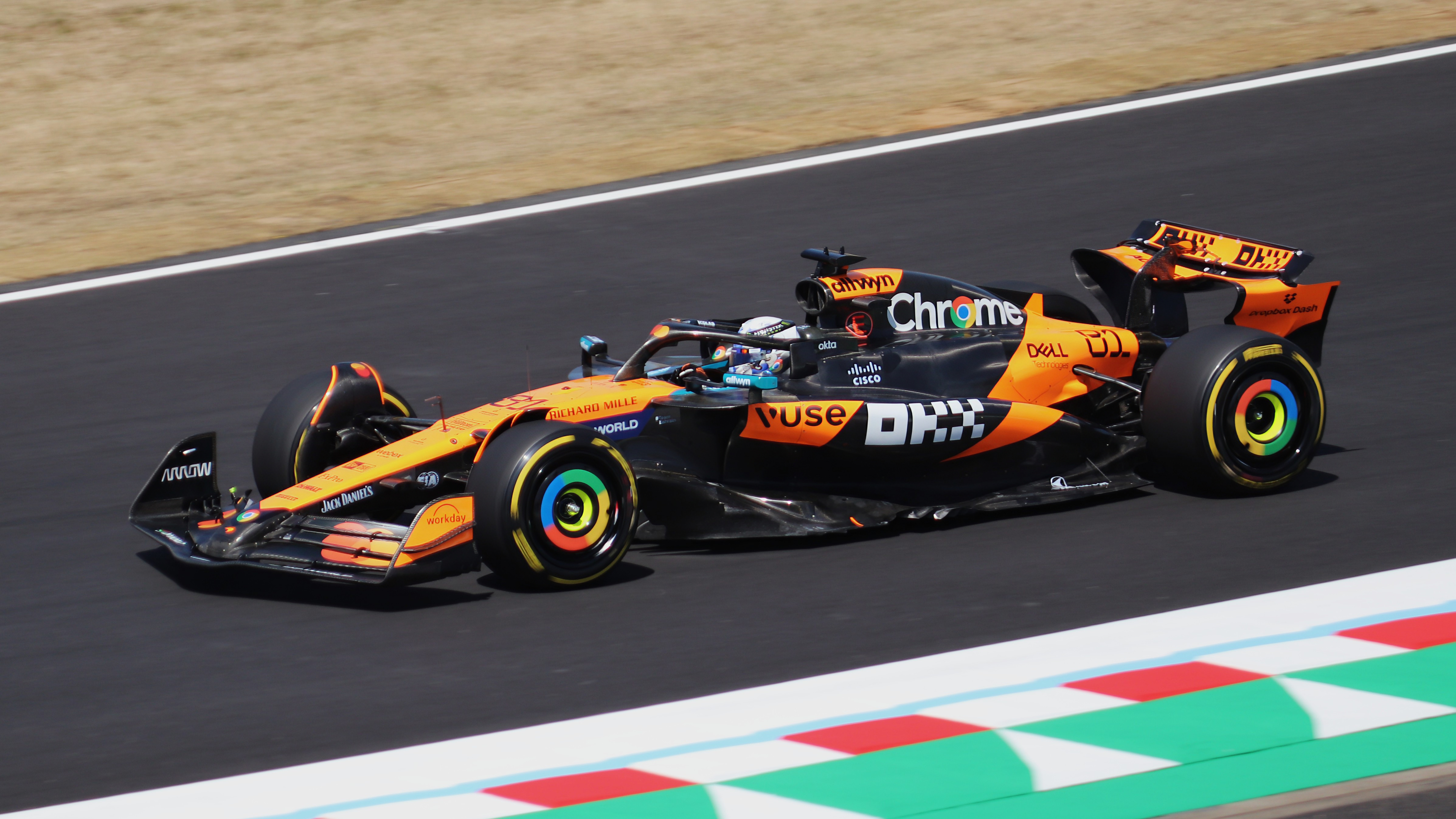
A McLaren MCL39 driven by Oscar Piastri during the Japanese Grand Prix

In single-seater (open-wheel) racing, the wheels are not covered, and the cars often have aerofoil wings front and rear to produce downforce and enhance adhesion to the track. The most popular varieties of open-wheel road racing are Formula One, IndyCar Series and Super Formula. In Europe and Asia, open-wheeled racing is commonly referred to as 'Formula', with appropriate hierarchical suffixes. In North America, the 'Formula' terminology is not followed (with the exception of Formula One). The sport is usually arranged to follow an international format (such as Formula One), a regional format (such as the Formula 3 Euro Series), or a domestic or country-specific format (such as the German Formula 3 championship or the British Formula Ford).

Formula One is a worldwide series that runs only street circuit and race tracks. These cars are heavily based on technology and their aerodynamics. The speed record was set in 2016 by Valtteri Bottas hitting 372.5 km/h (231 mph). Some of the most prominent races are the Monaco Grand Prix, the Italian Grand Prix, and the British Grand Prix. The season ends with the crowning of the World Championship for drivers and constructors.

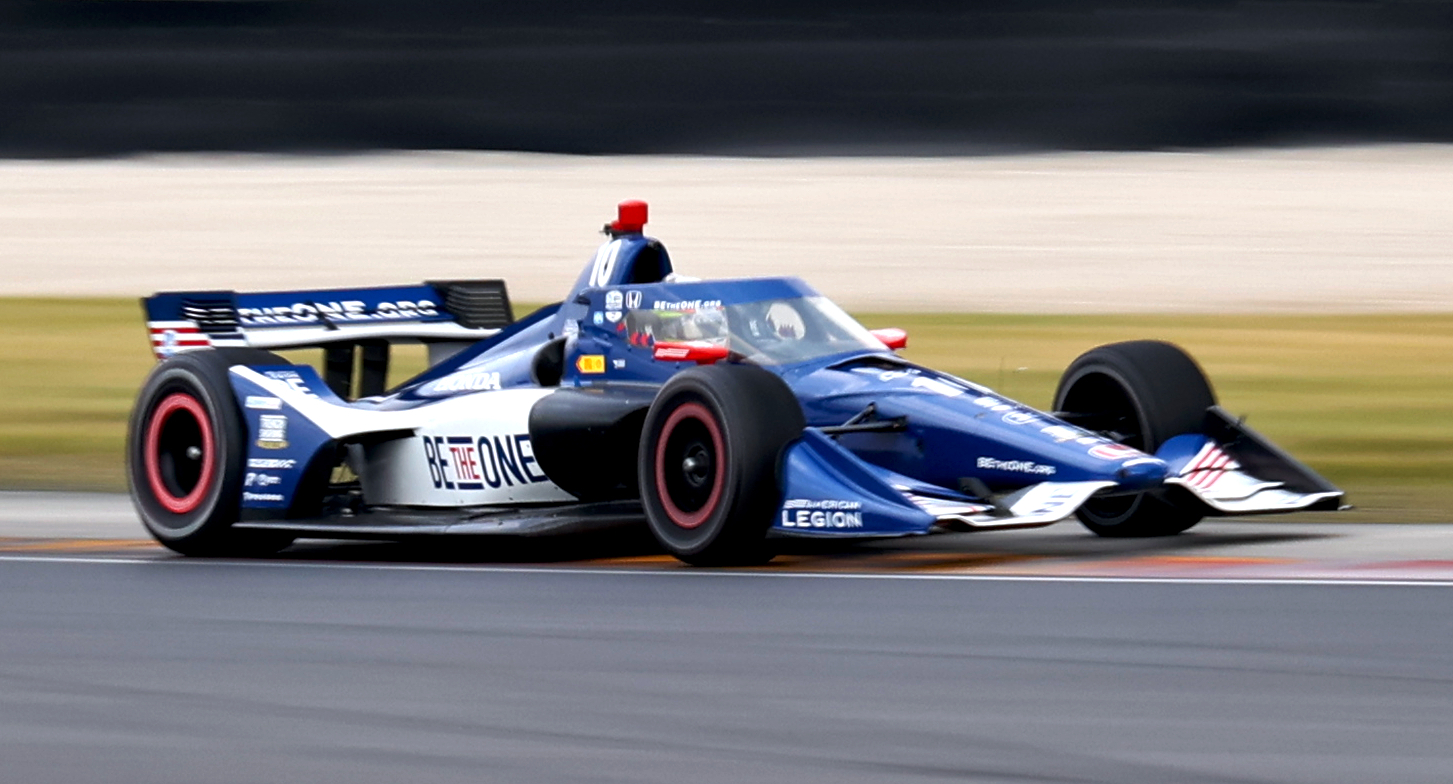
A Dallara DW12 IndyCar driven by Álex Palou during the 2023 Sonsio Grand Prix at Road America

In the United States, the most popular series is the IndyCar Series. The cars have traditionally been similar to, though less technologically sophisticated than, F1 cars, with more restrictions on technology aimed at controlling costs. While these cars are not as technologically advanced, they are faster, in part due to their lower downforce compared to Formula One cars, and also because they compete on oval race tracks, being able to average a lap at 388 km/h (241 mph). The series' biggest race is the Indianapolis 500, which is commonly referred to as "The Greatest Spectacle in Racing" due to being the longest continuously run race in the series and having the largest crowd for a single-day sporting event (350,000+).

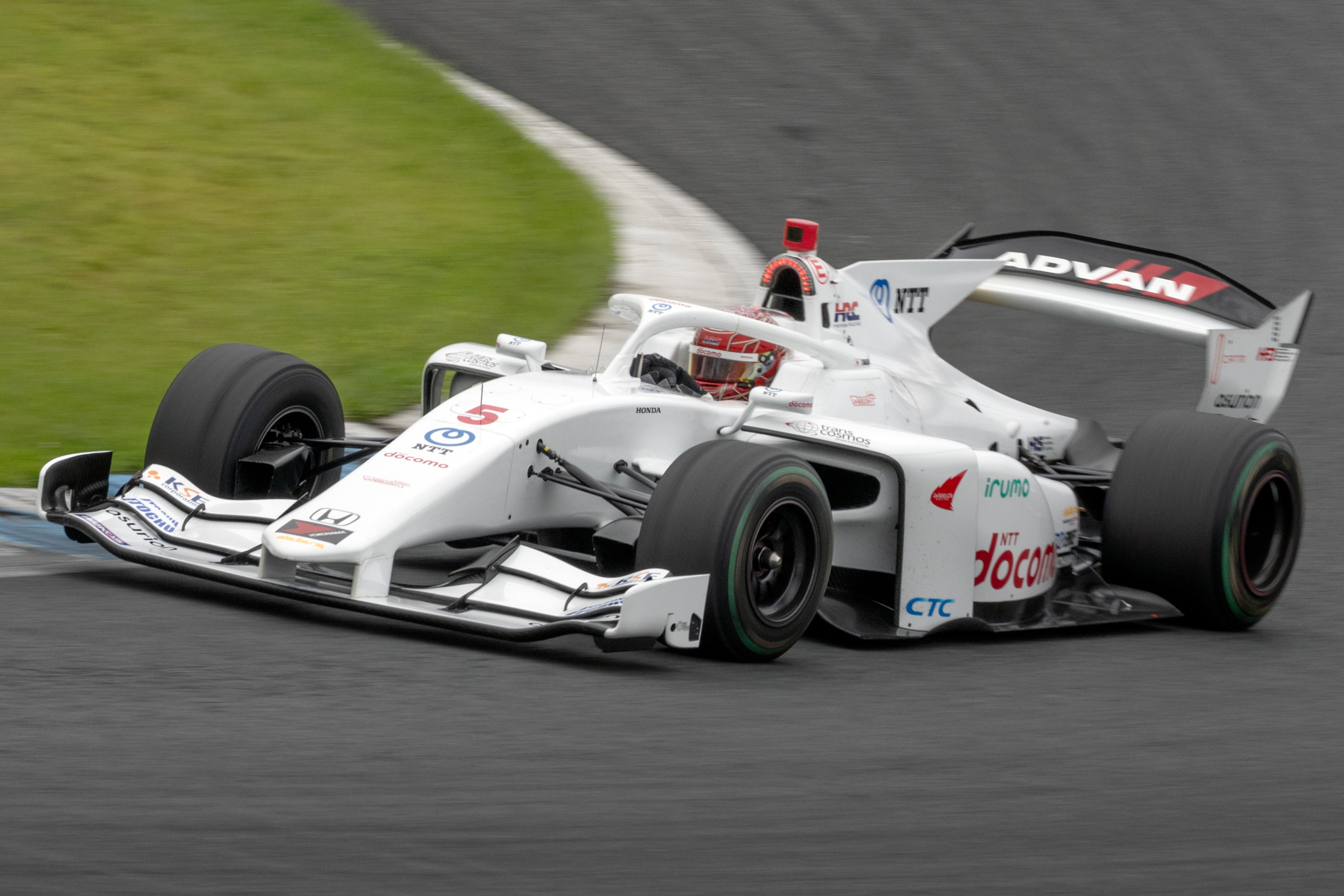
A Dallara SF23 driven by Tadasuke Makino at the 2024 Super Formula Motegi round

The other major international single-seater racing series is Formula 2 (formerly known as Formula 3000 and GP2 Series). Regional series include Super Formula and Formula V6 Asia (specifically in Asia), Formula Renault 3.5 (also known as the World Series by Renault, succession series of World Series by Nissan), Formula Three, Formula Palmer Audi and Formula Atlantic. In 2009, the FIA Formula Two Championship brought about the revival of the F2 series. Domestic, or country-specific, series include Formula Three and Formula Renault, with the leading introductory series being Formula Ford.

Single-seater racing is not limited merely to professional teams and drivers. There exist many amateur racing clubs. In the UK, the major club series are the Monoposto Racing Club, BRSCC F3 (formerly ClubF3, formerly ARP F3), Formula Vee, Club Formula Ford and Formula 4. Each series caters to a section of the market, with some primarily providing low-cost racing, while others aim for an authentic experience using the same regulations as the professional series (BRSCC F3). The SCCA is also responsible for sanctioning single-seater racing in much of North America.

There are other categories of single-seater racing, including kart racing, which employs a small, low-cost machine on small tracks. Many of the current top drivers began their careers in karts. Formula Ford represents the most popular first open-wheel category for up-and-coming drivers stepping up from karts. The series is still the preferred option, as it has introduced an aero package and slicks, allowing the junior drivers to gain experience in a race car with dynamics closer to Formula One. The Star Mazda Series is another entry-level series. Indy NXT represent the last step on the Road to Indy, being less powerful and lighter than an IndyCar racer.

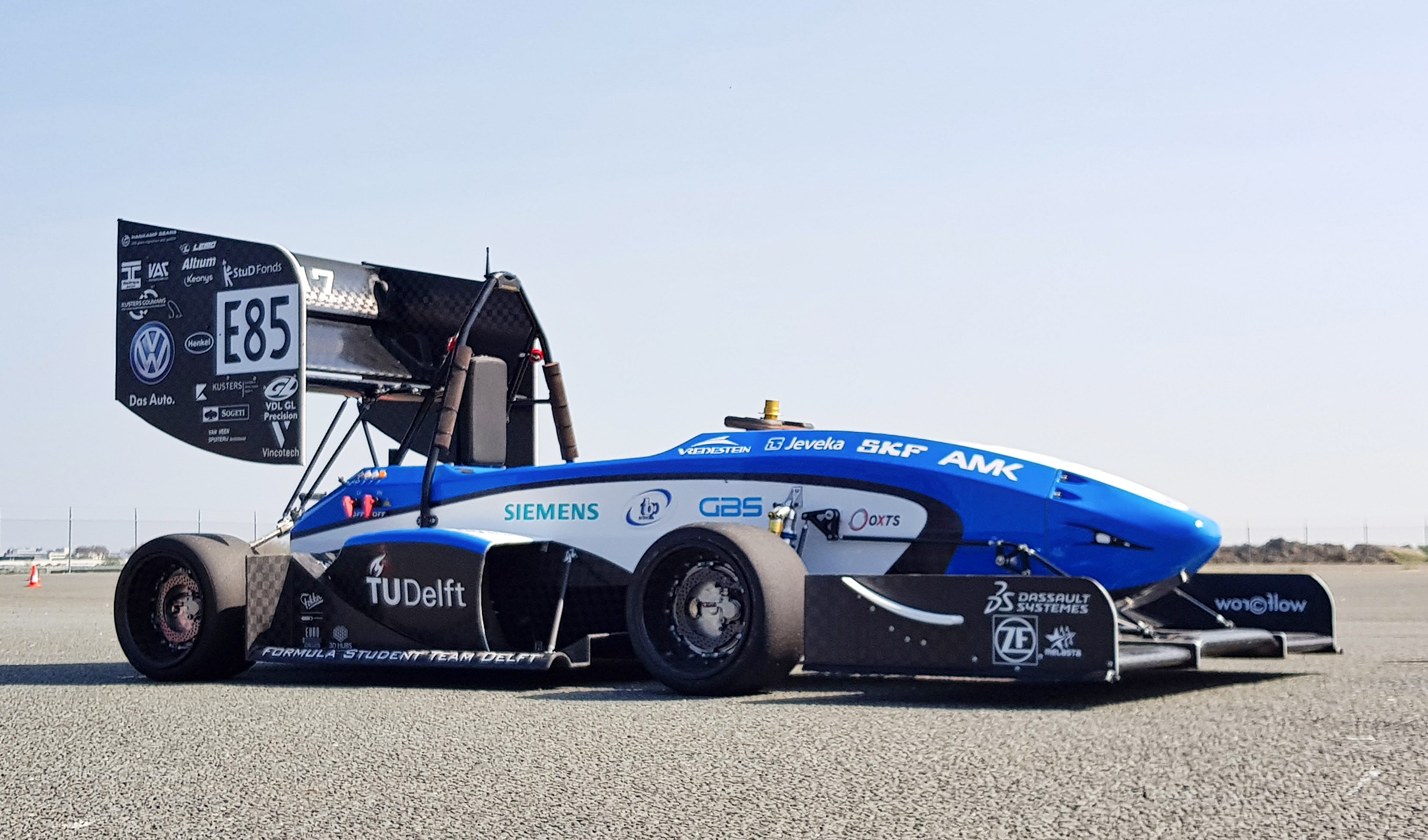
The 2017 Formula Student electric race-car of the Delft University of Technology

Students at colleges and universities can also take part in single-seater racing through the Formula SAE competition, which involves designing and building a single-seater car in a multidisciplinary team and racing it at the competition. This also develops other soft skills, such as teamwork, while promoting motorsport and engineering.

The world's first all-female Formula racing team was created in 2006. The group was an assemblage of drivers from different racing disciplines and formed for an MTV reality pilot, which was shot at Mazda Raceway Laguna Seca.

In December 2005, the FIA gave approval to Superleague Formula racing, which debuted in 2008, whereby the racing teams are owned and run by prominent sports clubs such as A.C. Milan and Liverpool F.C.

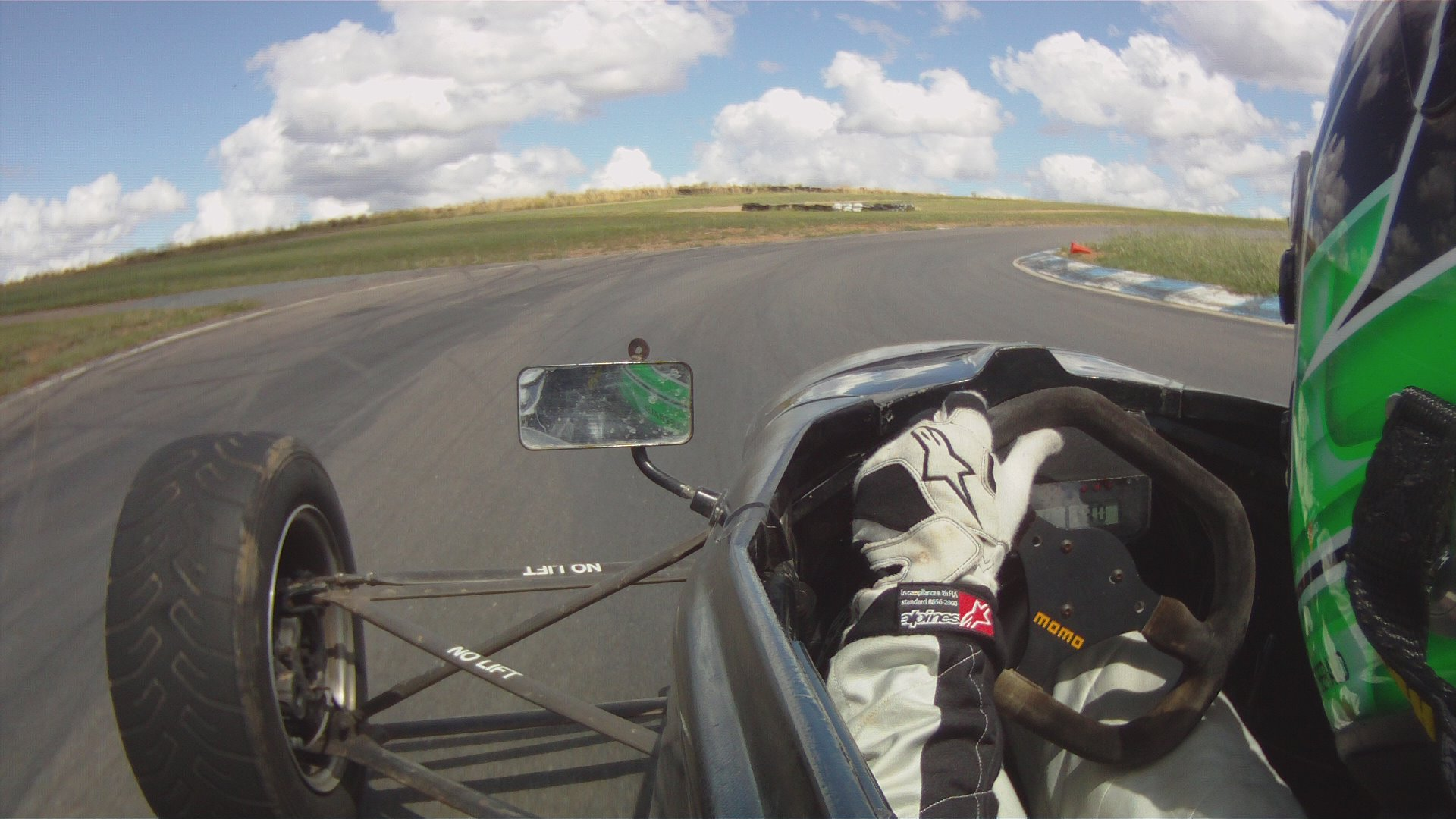
Racing driver's view

After 25 years away from the sport, former Formula 2 champion Jonathan Palmer reopened the F2 category again; most drivers have graduated from the Formula Palmer Audi series. The category is officially registered as the FIA Formula Two championship. Most rounds have two races and are support races to the FIA World Touring Car Championship.

=== Touring car racing ===
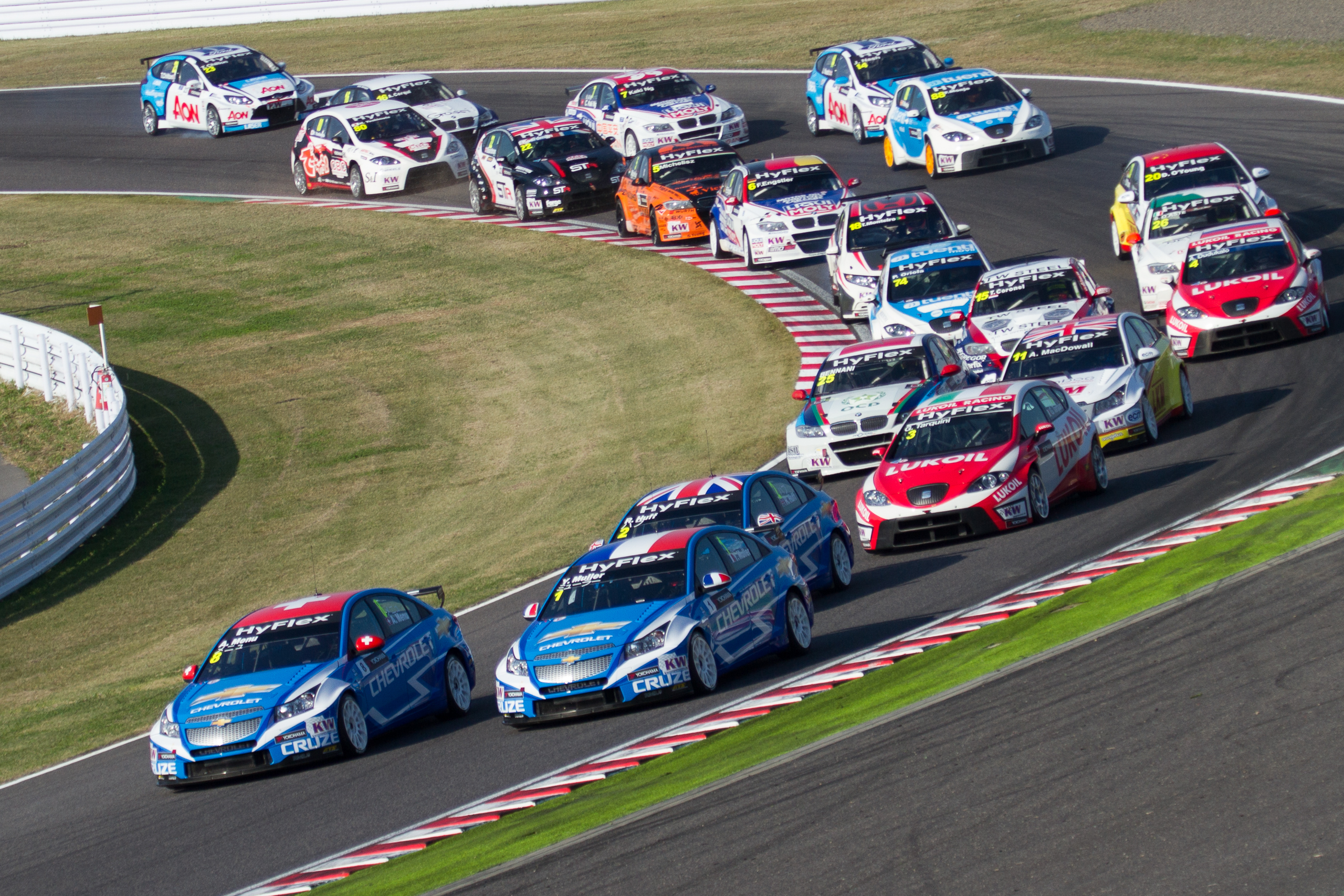
World Touring Car Championship 2012 Race of Japan: Opening lap of Race 1.

Touring car racing is a style of road racing that is run with production-derived four-seat race cars. The lesser use of aerodynamics means following cars have a much easier time following and passing than in open-wheel racing. It often features full-contact racing with subtle bumping and nudging due to the small speed differentials and large grids.

The major touring car championships conducted worldwide are the Supercars Championship (Australia), British Touring Car Championship, and Deutsche Tourenwagen Masters (DTM). World Touring Car Championship and the World Touring Car Cup are proper World-level Touring Car series sanctioned by FIA with various regulations until both championships folded. The European Touring Car Cup is a one-day event open to Super 2000 specification touring cars from Europe's many national championships. While Super GT traces its lineage to the now-defunct JGTC, the cars are much more similar to GT3 race cars than proper touring cars, and also have much more aggressive aerodynamics.

The Sports Car Club of America's SPEED World Challenge Touring Car and GT championships are dominant in North America. America's historic Trans-Am Series is undergoing a period of transition, but is still the longest-running road racing series in the U.S. The National Auto Sport Association also provides a venue for amateurs to compete in home-built factory-derived vehicles on various local circuits.

=== Sports car racing ===
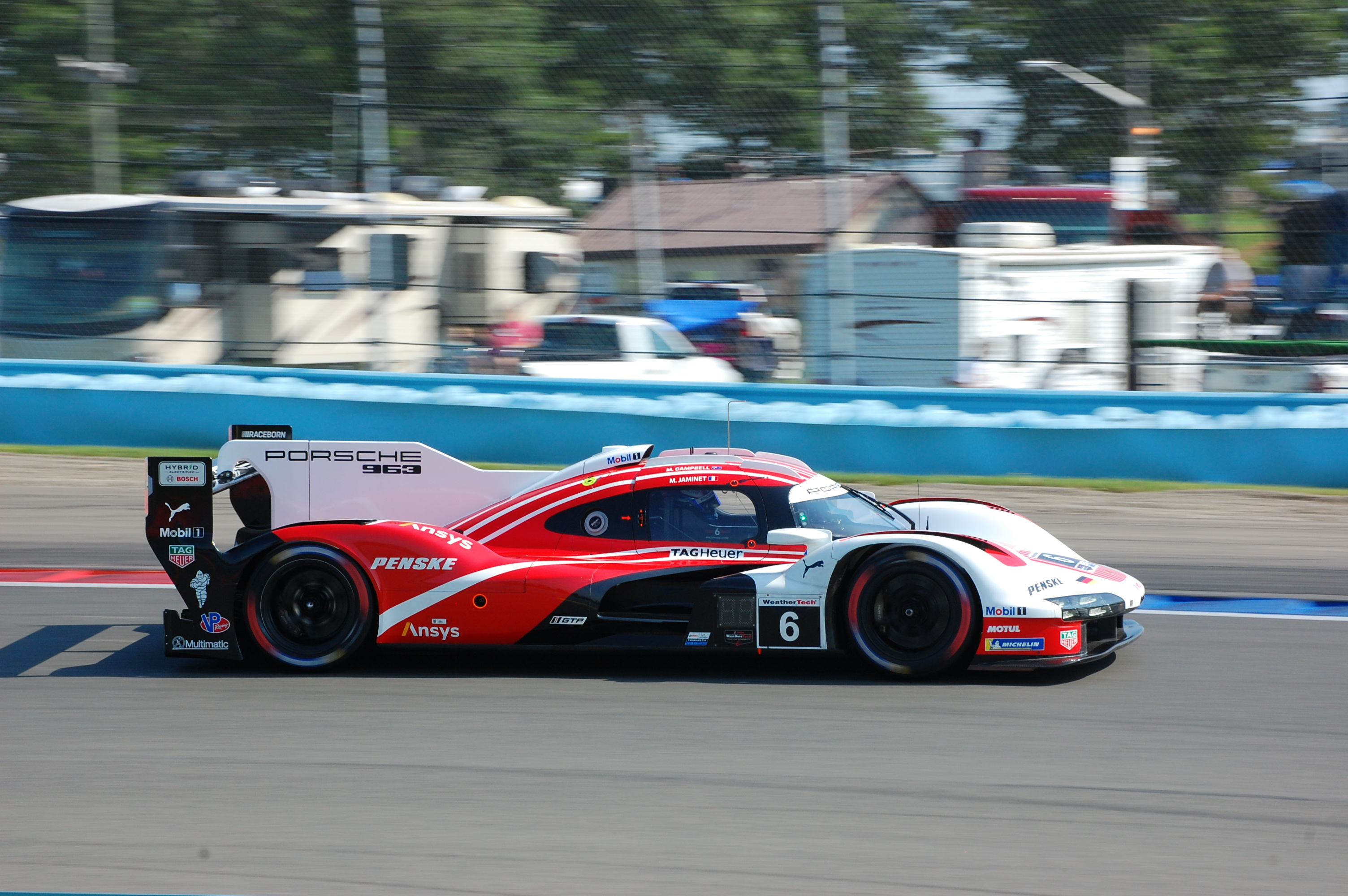
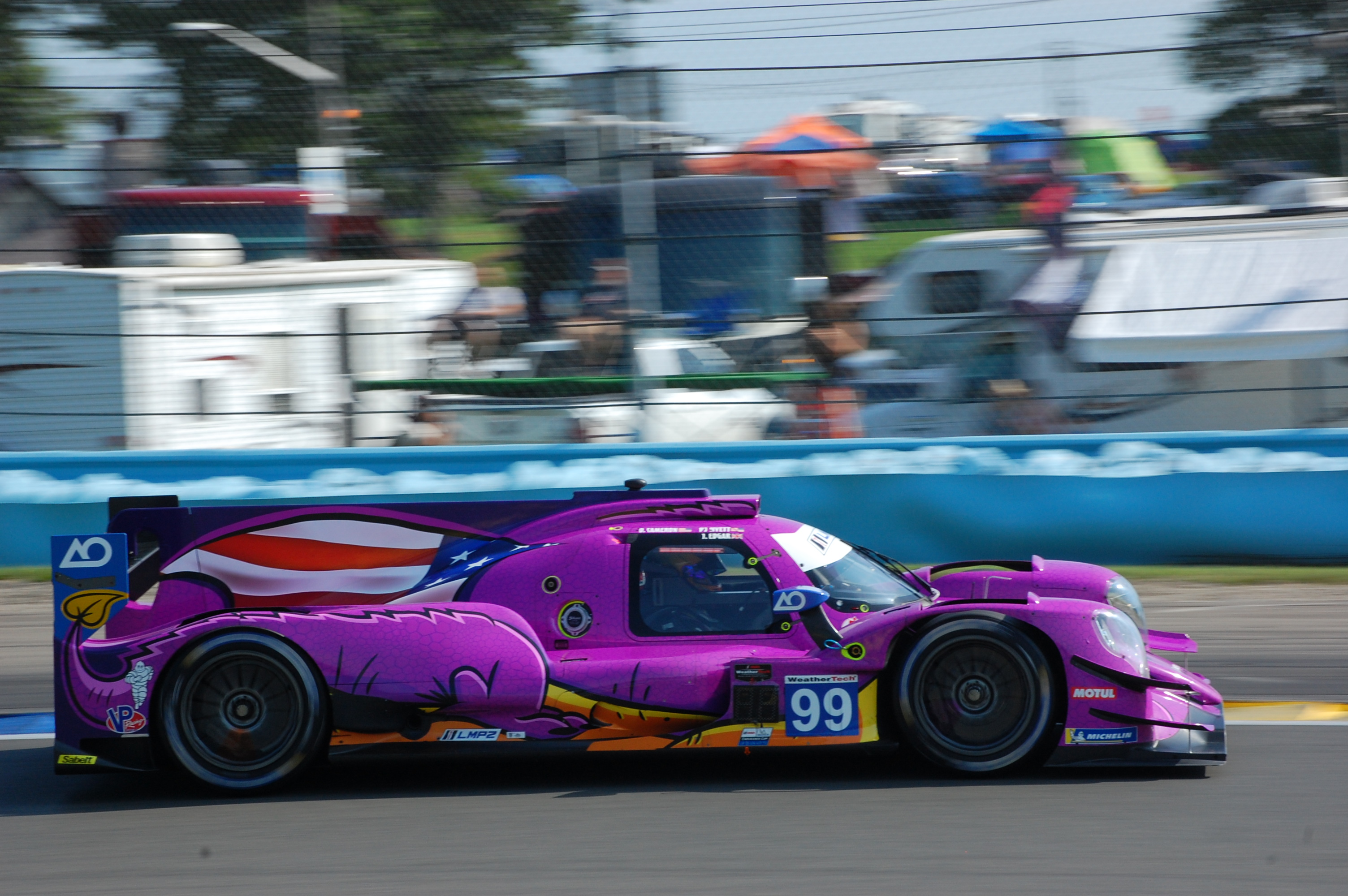
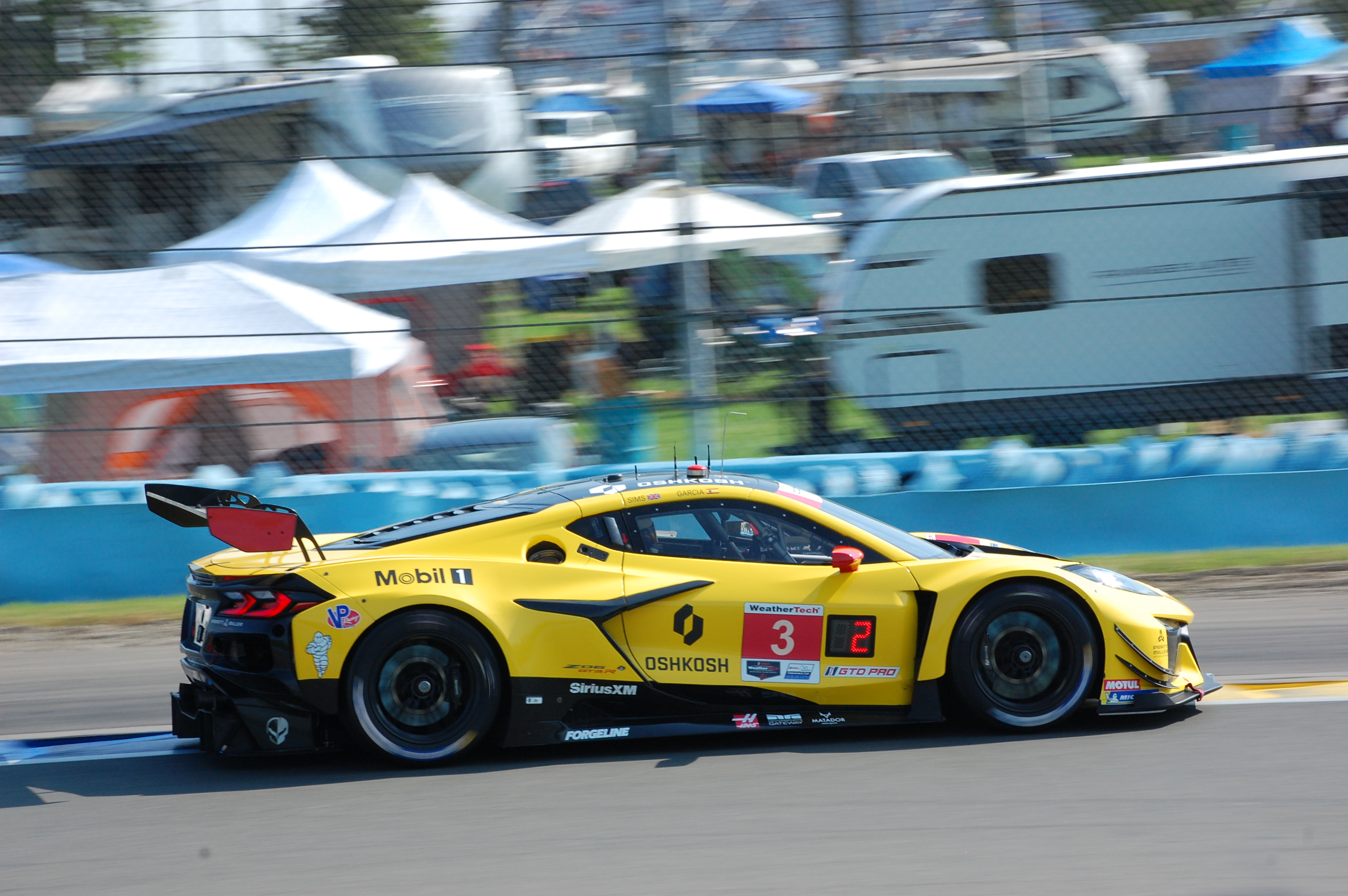
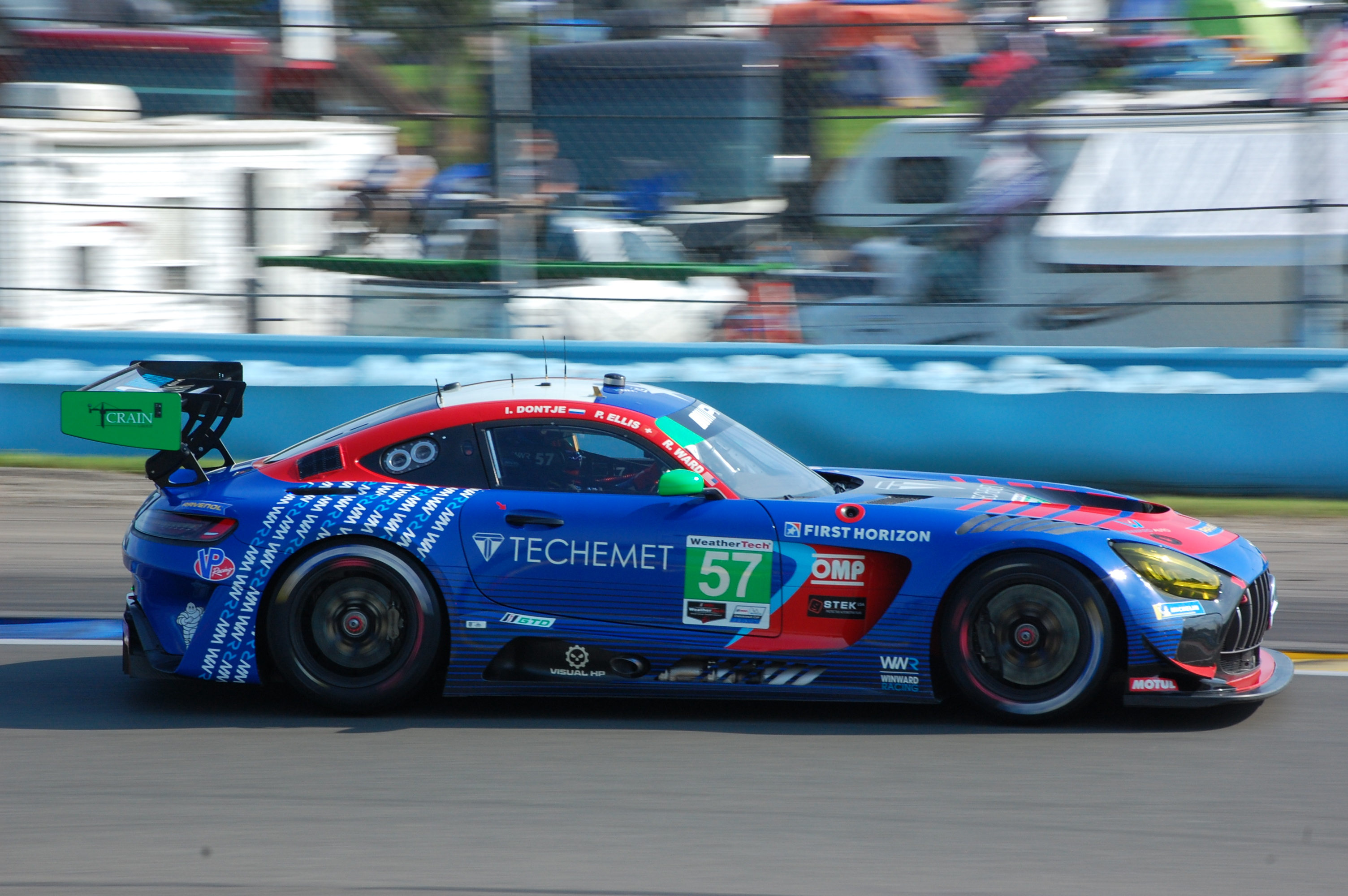
A Grand Touring Prototype (Upper Left) Le Mans Prototype 2 (Upper Right) GT Daytona Pro (Bottom Left) and GT Daytona (Bottom Right) competing in the 2025 IMSA SportsCar Championship

In sports car racing, production-derived versions of two-seat sports cars, also known as grand tourers (GTs), and purpose-built sports prototype cars compete within their respective classes on closed circuits. The premier championship series of sports car racing is the FIA World Endurance Championship. The main series for GT car racing is the GT World Challenge Europe, divided into two separate championships: the GT World Challenge Europe Sprint Cup and the GT World Challenge Europe Endurance Cup. This series has formed after the folding of the various FIA GT championships.

The prevailing classes of GT cars are GT3, GT4 and GT2 class cars. GT2 cars have powerful engines, often exceeding 600 horsepower. However, they have less downforce than GT3 cars and also have less driver aids. GT3 cars are far and away the most popular class of GT cars, with premier racing series such as the FIA World Endurance Championship and IMSA both using GT3 as their top class of GT car. GT3 cars have more significant aero than a GT2 car, but also have less horsepower, typically falling in between 500 and 550 horsepower. GT4 class cars have very little aerodynamics and less horsepower than GT3 machinery, typically around 450 horsepower. GT4 typically serves as the last step up to premier GT-class racing.

Other major GT championships include the GT World Challenge America, GT World Challenge Asia, Super GT, and the International GT Open. There are minor regional and national GT series using mainly GT4 and GT3 cars featuring both amateur and professional drivers.

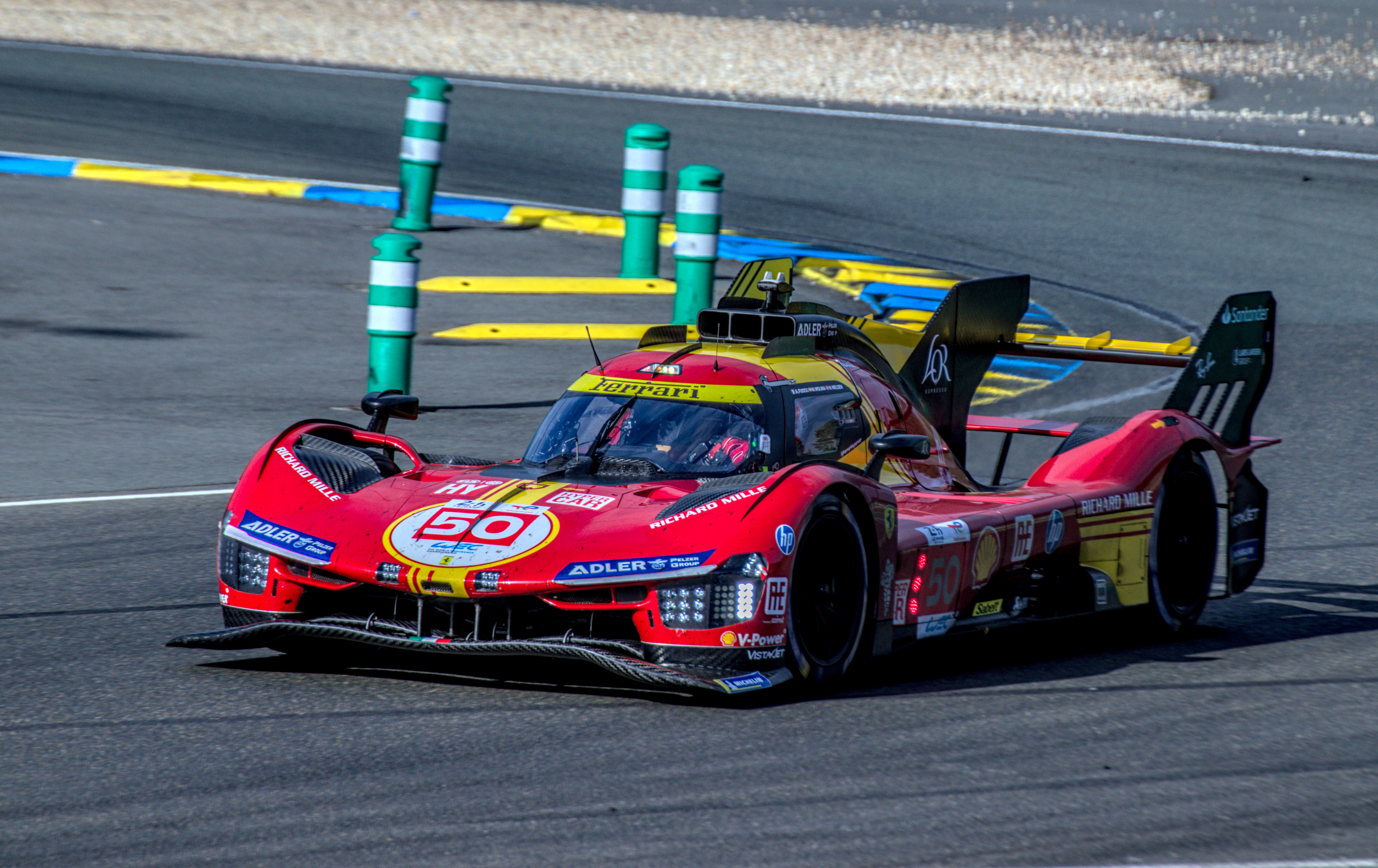
The Ferrari 499P that took the overall victory at the 2024 24 Hours of Le Mans

Sports prototypes, unlike GT cars, do not rely on road-legal cars as a base. They are closed-wheel and often closed-cockpit purpose-built race cars intended mainly for endurance racing. They have much lower weight, more horsepower and more downforce compared to GT cars, making them much faster. They are raced in the 24 hours of Le Mans (held annually since 1923) and in the (European) Le Mans series, Asian Le Mans Series and the WeatherTech SportsCar Championship. These cars are referred to as LMP (Le Mans prototype) cars with LMH and LMDh cars being run mainly by manufacturers and the slightly less powerful LMP2 cars run by privateer teams. All three Le Mans Series run GT cars in addition to Le Mans Prototypes; these cars have different restrictions than the FIA GT cars.

Another prototype and GT racing championship exists in the United States; the Grand-Am, which began in 2000, sanctions its own endurance series, the Rolex Sports Car Series, which consists of slower and lower-cost Daytona Prototype race cars compared to LMP and FIA GT cars. The Rolex Sports Car Series and American Le Mans Series announced a merger between the two series forming the WeatherTech SportsCar Championship starting in 2014.

These races are often conducted over long distances, at least 1,000 km (621 mi), and cars are driven by teams of two or more drivers, switching every few hours. Due to the performance difference between production-based sports cars and purpose-built sports prototypes, one race usually involves several racing classes, each fighting for its own championship. Famous sports car races include the 24 Hours of Le Mans, the Rolex 24 at Daytona, 24 Hours of Spa-Franchorchamps, the 12 Hours of Sebring, the 6 Hours of Watkins Glen, and the 1,000-mile (1,600 km) Petit Le Mans at Road Atlanta. There is also the 24 Hours of the Nürburgring on the famed Nordschleife track, the Bathurst 12 Hour on the Mount Panorama Circuit, the Suzuka 1000 km is the International Summer Endurance Race at East Asia, and the Dubai 24 Hour, which is aimed at GT3 and below cars with a mixture of professional and pro-am drivers.

=== Production-car racing ===
Production-car racing, otherwise known as "showroom stock" in the US, is an economical and rules-restricted version of touring-car racing, mainly used to restrict costs. Numerous production racing categories are based on particular makes of cars.

Most series, with a few exceptions, follow the Group N regulation. There are several different series that are run all over the world, most notably, Japan's Super Taikyu and IMSA's Firehawk Series, which ran in the 1980s and 1990s all over the United States.

=== Stock car racing ===
NASCAR green flag start at Daytona International Speedway for the 2015 Daytona 500

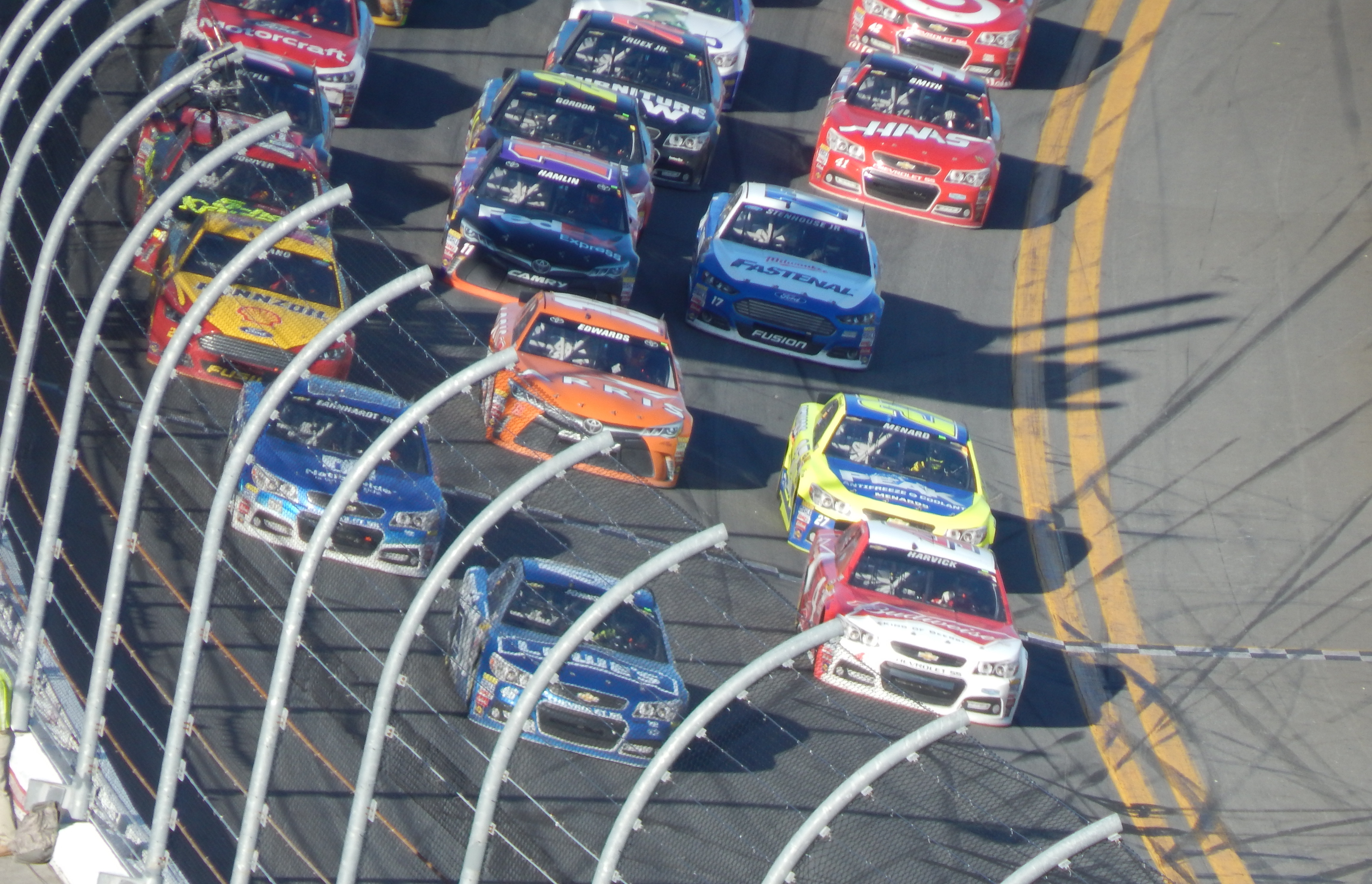
Jimmie Johnson leads the field racing three-wide multiple rows back at Daytona International Speedway in the 2015 Daytona 500.

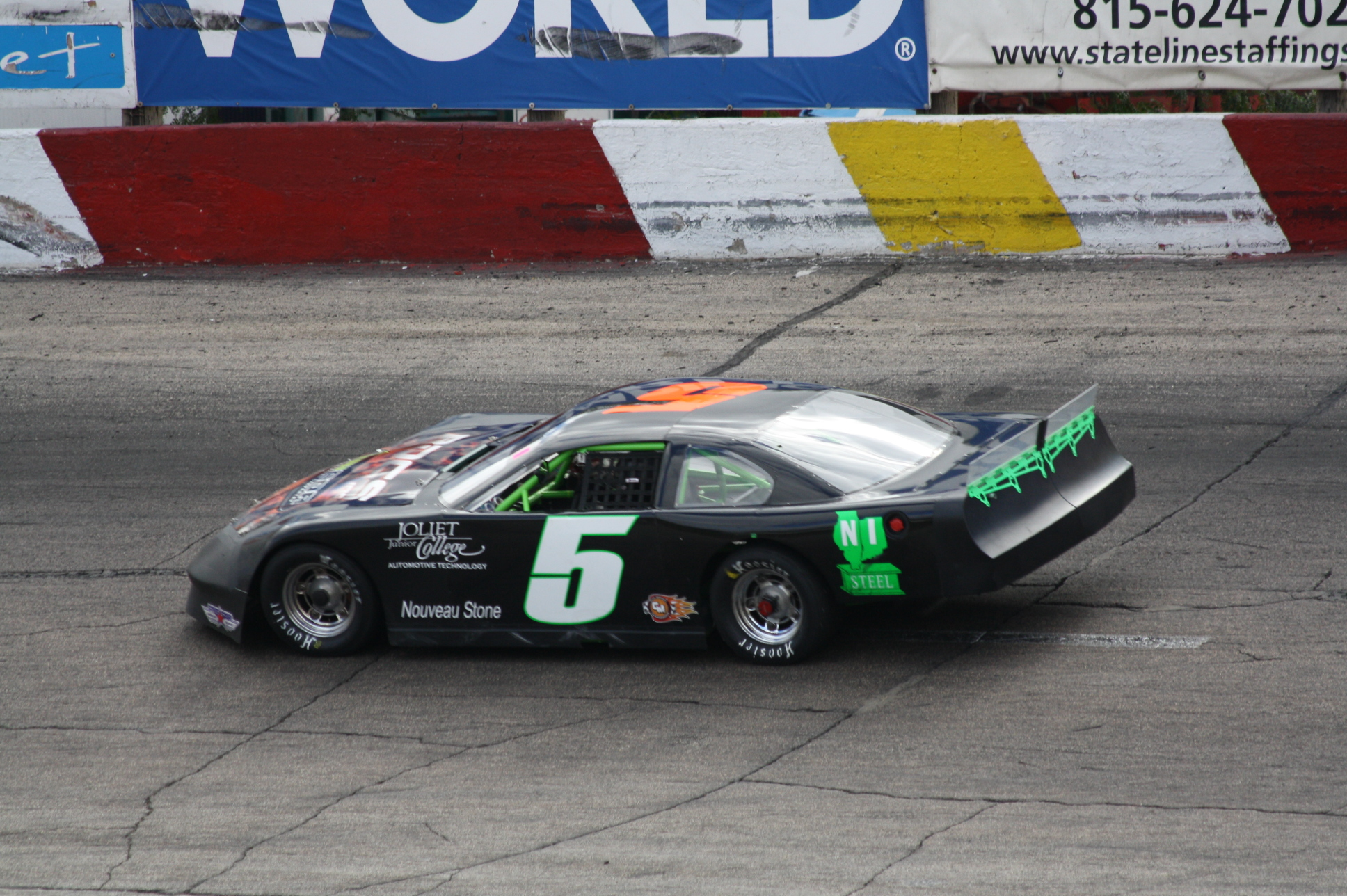
An ASA Late Model Series stock car on an asphalt track

In North America, stock car racing is the most popular form of auto racing. Primarily raced on oval tracks, stock cars vaguely resemble production cars, but are in fact purpose-built racing machines that are built to tight specifications and, together with touring cars, also called Silhouette racing cars.

The largest stock car racing governing body is NASCAR (National Association for Stock Car Auto Racing). NASCAR's premier series is the NASCAR Cup Series, its most famous races being the Daytona 500, the Southern 500, the Coca-Cola 600, and the Brickyard 400. NASCAR also runs several feeder series, including the Xfinity Series and Craftsman Truck Series (a pickup truck racing series). The series conduct races across the entire continental United States. NASCAR also sanctions series outside of the United States, including the NASCAR Canada Series, NASCAR Mexico Series, NASCAR Whelen Euro Series, and NASCAR Brasil Sprint Race.

NASCAR also governs several smaller regional series, such as the Whelen Modified Tour. Modified cars are best described as open-wheel cars. Modified cars have no parts related to the stock vehicle for which they are named after. A number of modified cars display a "manufacturer's" logo and "vehicle name", yet use components produced by another automobile manufacturer.

There are also other stock car governing bodies, most notably the Automobile Racing Club of America (ARCA).

In the UK, British Stock car racing is also referred to as "Short Circuit Racing". UK Stock car racing started in the 1950s and grew rapidly through the 1960s and 1970s. Events take place on shale or tarmac tracks – usually around 1/4 mile long. There are around 35 tracks in the UK and upwards of 7000 active drivers. The sport is split into three basic divisions – distinguished by the rules regarding car contact during racing. The most famous championship are the BriSCA F1 Stock Cars.

Full-contact formulas include Bangers, Bombers, and Rookie Bangers – and racing features Demolition Derbies, Figure of Eight, and Oval Racing.

Semi Contact Formulas include BriSCA F1, F2, and Superstox – where bumpers are used tactically.

Non-contact formulas include National Hot Rods, Stock Rods, and Lightning Rods.

=== One-make racing ===
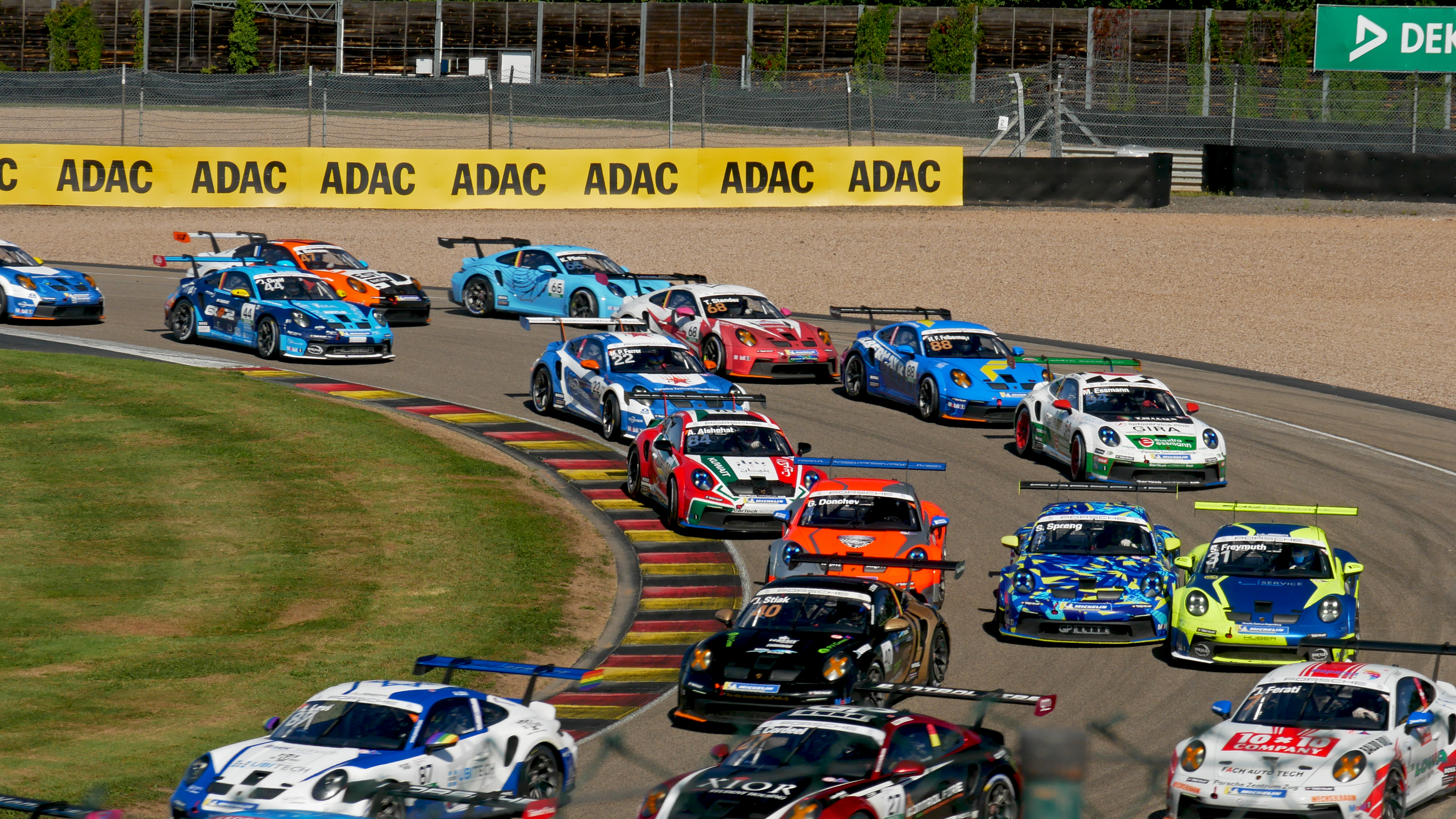
2023 Porsche Carrera Cup Germany field at the Sachsenring.

One-make, or single marque, championships often employ production-based sports cars from a single manufacturer, or even a single model from a manufacturer's range. There are numerous notable one-make series from various countries and regions such as the Porsche Carrera Cup and, previously the International Race of Champions have fostered many distinct national championships. Single marque series are often found at the club level, where production-based cars, limited modifications, and close parity in performance make them well-suited for competitive racing.

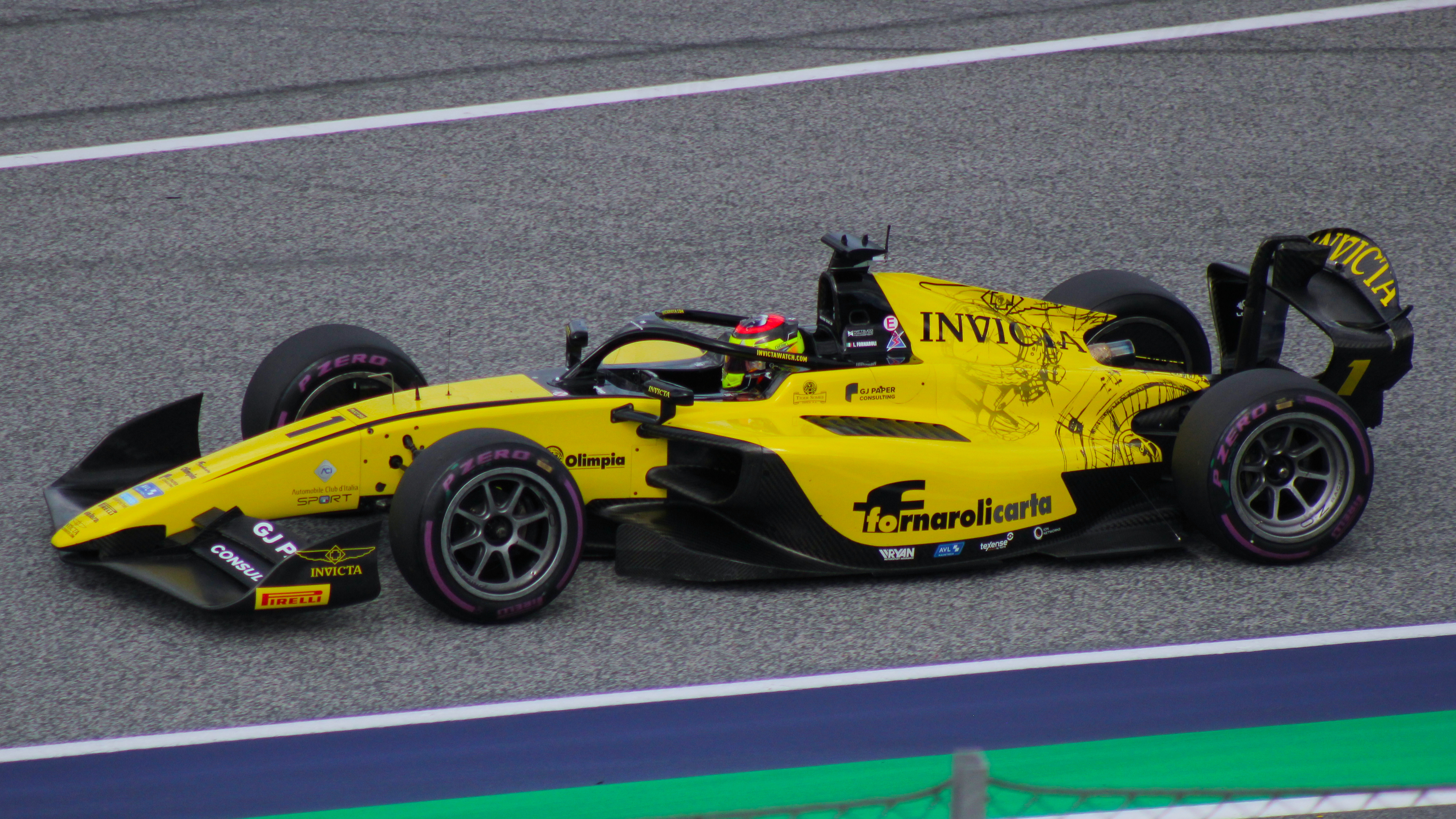
A Dallara F2 2024 driven by 2025 Formula 2 Championship winner Leonardo Fornaroli.

There are also open-wheel, single-make chassis series, such as Formula BMW, Formula Renault, and GP2, which are now defunct. These series were primarily designed to develop young driving talent and prepare them for premier championships such as Formula One. Currently, the most well-known lower-tier single-seater championships that use spec cars are Formula 2 and Indy NXT, where all teams compete with standardized chassis and engines. These series maintain close competition while emphasizing driver skill and providing a clear pathway for progression to top-level motorsport.

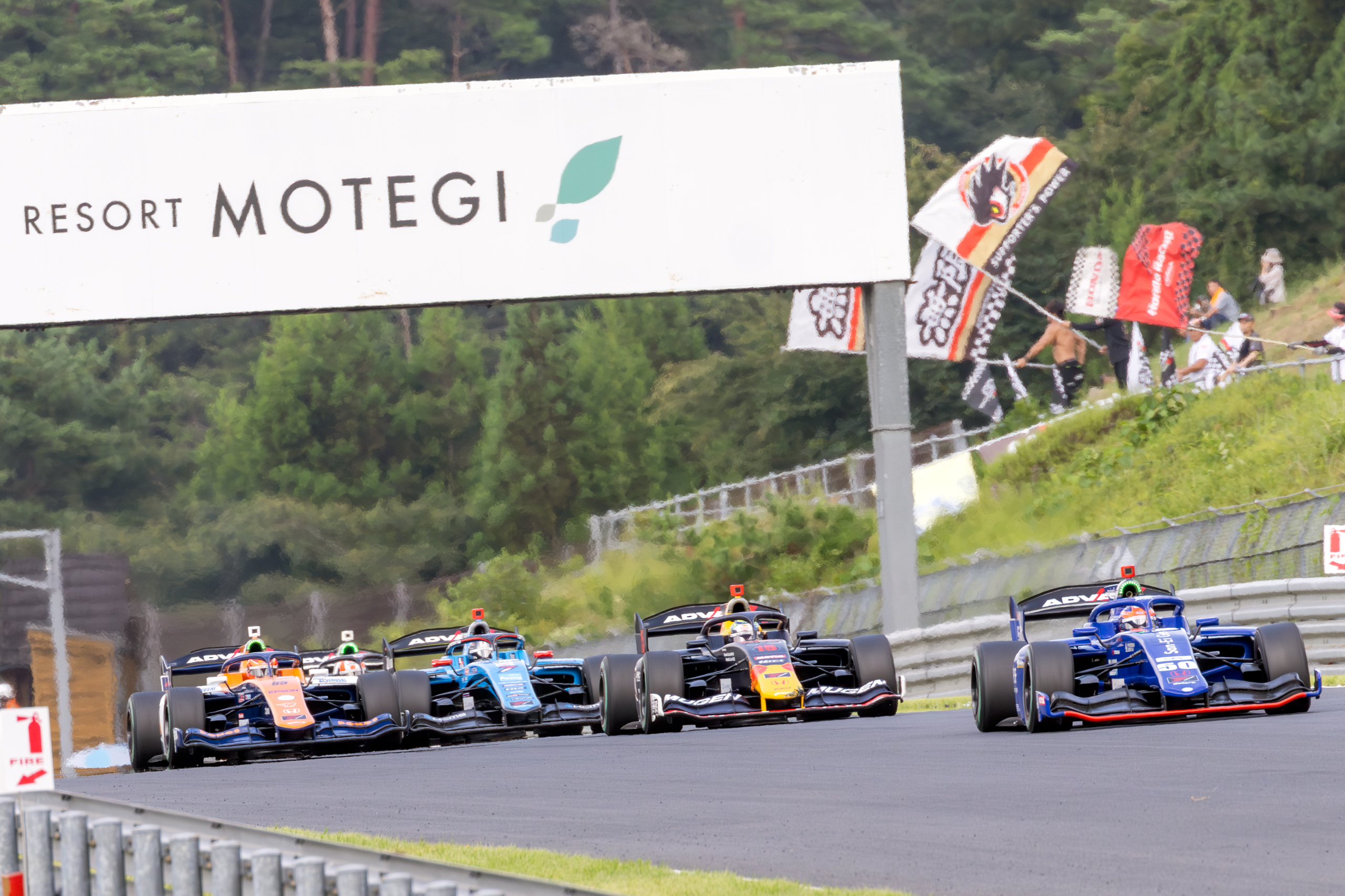
Start of a Super Formula race at the 2024 Motegi round using Dallara SF23s.

However, not all one-make racing series use identical engines or powertrains. While some series are strictly single-make with standardized engines, others allow multiple manufacturers to compete, creating technical diversity within a standardized chassis. Series such as Super Formula, Formula E, and IndyCar feature multiple engine suppliers even when the chassis is standardized. In the 2025 Super Formula season, all teams use the Dallara SF23 as the spec chassis, ensuring parity in aerodynamics and overall car design. However, teams can select between engines developed by Toyota and Honda, each offering distinct performance characteristics, reliability, and tuning potential. This combination of standardized chassis with multiple engine options allows for competitive racing while still promoting manufacturer involvement and engineering innovation.

=== Drag racing ===
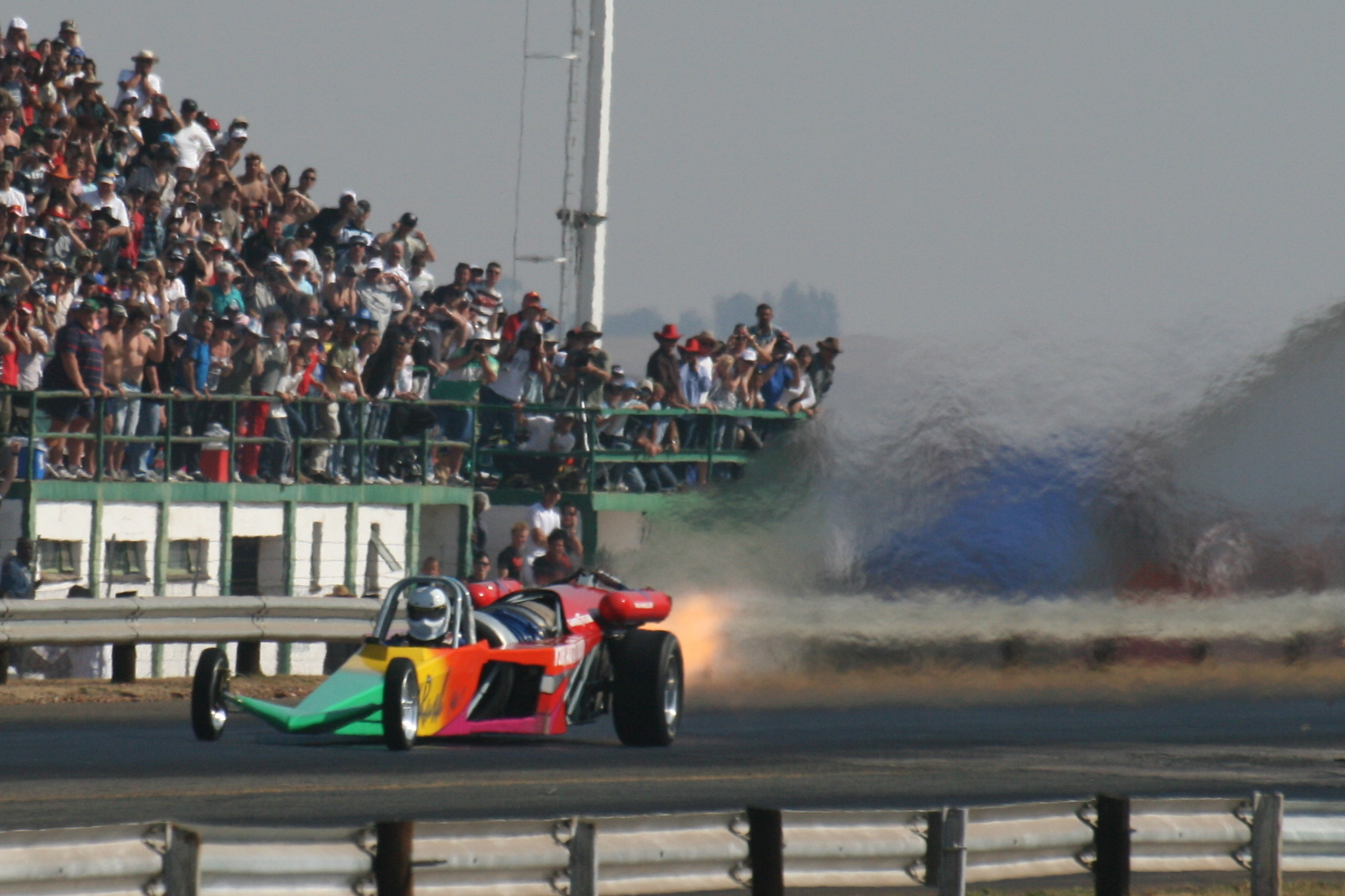
Jet-propelled dragster in Tarlton, Gauteng, South Africa

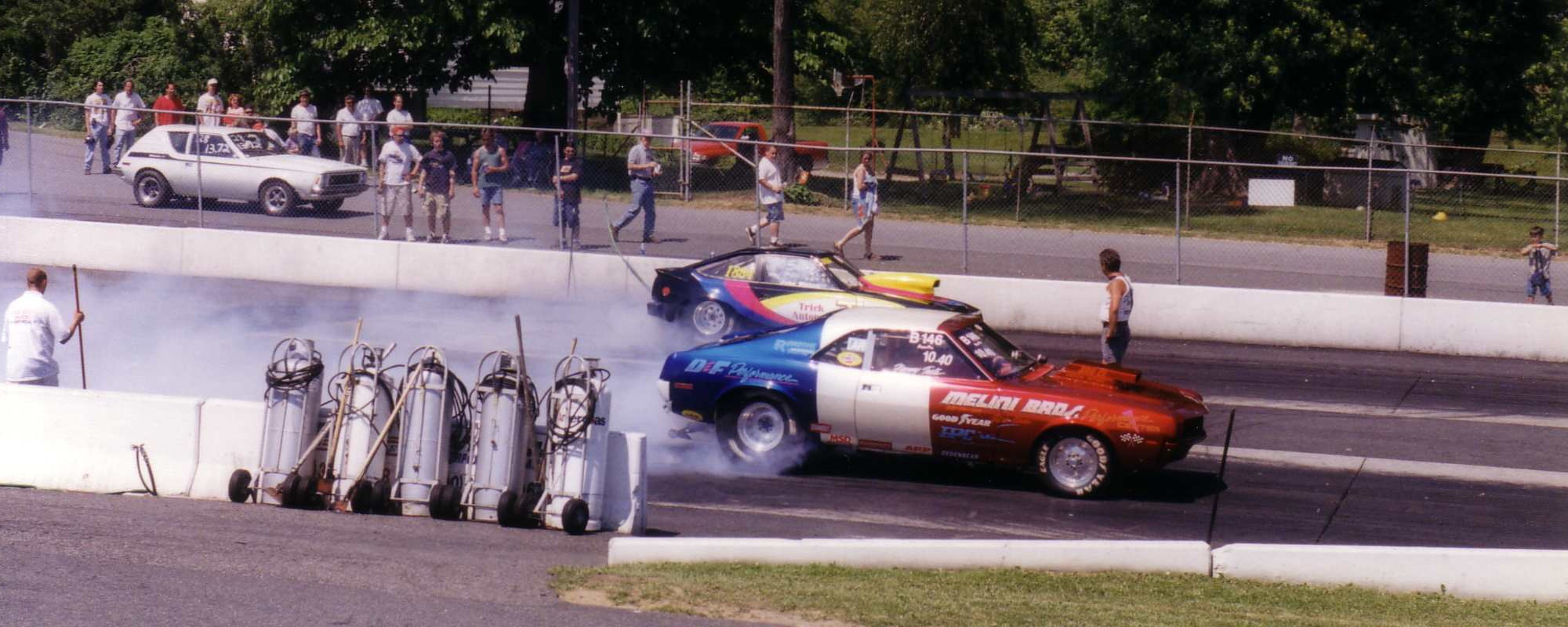
Two modified AMCs launching at a dragstrip

In drag racing, the objective is to complete a given straight-line distance, from a standing start, ahead of a vehicle in a parallel lane. This distance is traditionally 1/4 mile (400 m), though 1,000 feet (300 m) and 1/8 mile (200 m) are also common. The vehicles may or may not be given the signal to start at the same time, depending on the class of racing. Vehicles range from the everyday car to the purpose-built dragster. Speeds and elapsed time differ from class to class. Average street cars cover the 1/4 mile in 12 to 16 seconds, whereas a top fuel dragster takes 4.5 seconds or less, reaching speeds of up to 530 km/h (329 mph). Drag racing was organized as a sport by Wally Parks in the early 1950s through the National Hot Rod Association (NHRA). The NHRA was formed to discourage street racing.

When launching, a top fuel dragster will accelerate at 3.4 g (33 m/s^{2}), and when braking parachutes are deployed the deceleration is 4 g (39 m/s^{2}), more than the Space Shuttle experiences. A top fuel car can be heard over 8 miles (13 km) away and can generate a reading equivalent to a magnitude 1.5 to 3.9 earthquake.

Drag racing is two cars head-to-head, the winner proceeding to the next round. Professional classes are all first to the finish line wins. Sportsman racing is handicapped (slower car getting a head start) using an index (a lowest e.t. allowed), and cars running under (quicker than) their index "break out" and lose. The slowest cars, bracket racers, are also handicapped, but rather than an index, they use a dial-in.

=== Off-road racing ===
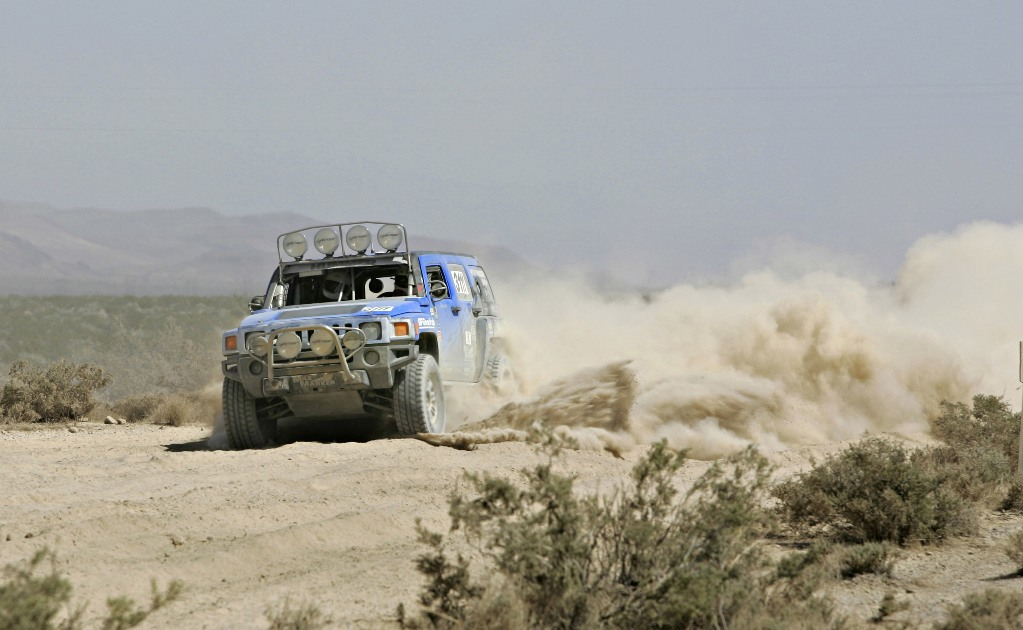
Rod Hall in a Hummer H3 during a Best in the Desert race

In off-road racing, various classes of specially modified vehicles, including cars, compete in races through off-road environments. In North America these races often take place in the desert, such as the famous Baja 1000. Another format for off-road racing happens on closed-course short course tracks such as Crandon International Off-Road Raceway. In the 1980s and 1990s, the short course was extended to racing inside stadiums in the Mickey Thompson Entertainment Group; this format was revived by Robby Gordon in 2013 with his Stadium Super Trucks series.

In Europe, "offroad" refers to events such as autocross or rallycross, while desert races and rally-raids such as the Paris-Dakar, Master Rallye or European "bajas" are called "cross-country rallies".

=== Kart racing ===
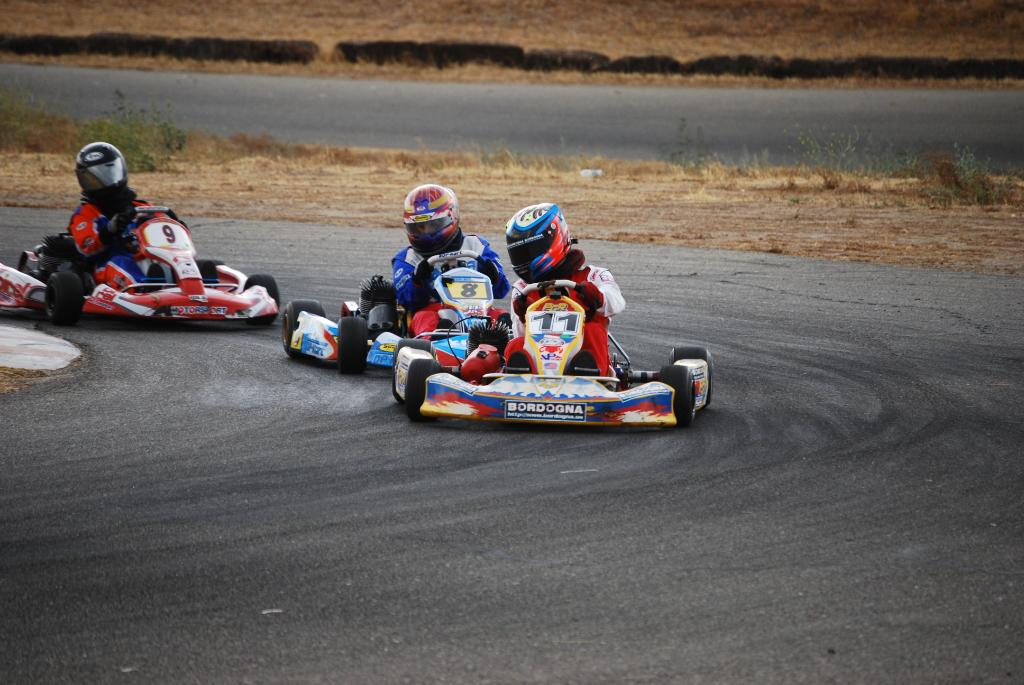
A sprint kart race in Atwater California hosted by the International Karting Federation

The modern kart was invented by Art Ingels, a fabricator at the Indianapolis-car manufacturer Kurtis-Kraft, in Southern California in 1956. Ingels took a small chainsaw engine and mounted it to a simple tube-frame chassis weighing less than 100 lb. Ingels, and everyone else who drove the kart, were startled at its performance capabilities. The sport soon blossomed in Southern California, and quickly spread around the world. Although often seen as the entry point for serious racers into the sport, kart racing, or karting, can be an economical way for amateurs to try racing and is also a fully-fledged international sport in its own right. A large proportion of professional racing drivers began in karts, often from a very young age, such as Michael Schumacher and Fernando Alonso. Several former motorcycle champions have also taken up the sport, notably Wayne Rainey, who was paralysed in a racing accident and now races a hand-controlled kart. As one of the cheapest ways to race, karting is seeing its popularity grow worldwide.

Despite their diminutive size, karts of the most powerful class, superkart (assuming a weight of 205 kg (452 lb), and a power output of 100 hp (75 kW)), can have a power-to-weight ratio (including the driver) of 490 hp/tonne (0.22 hp/lb). Without the driver, this figure doubles, to almost 980 hp/tonne (0.44 hp/lb).

=== Historical racing ===
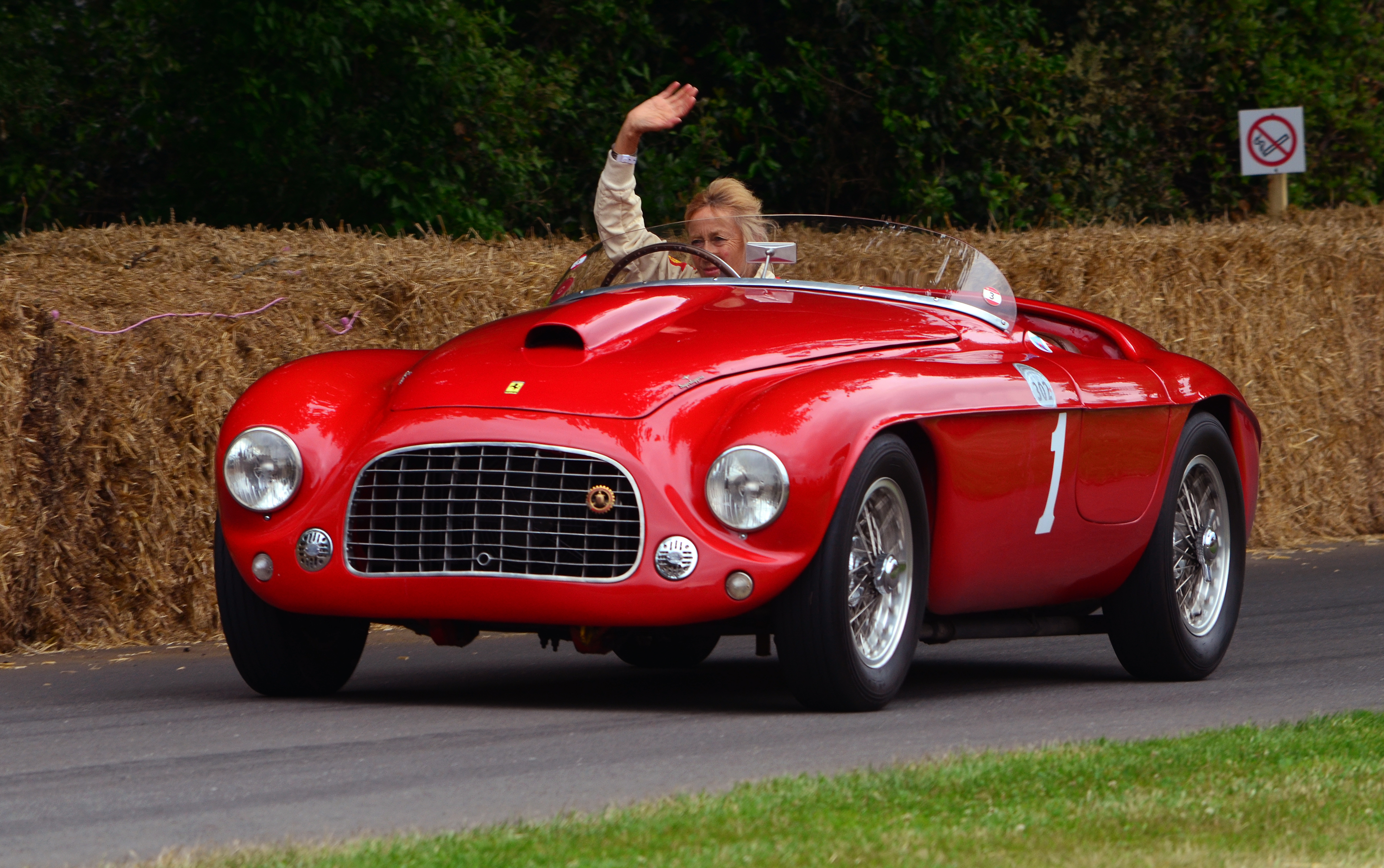
The first pairing to climb the Goodwood hill in 1993 was Sally Mason-Styrron and her Ferrari 166 MM Barchetta, seen here at the 2022 event.

Historic motorsport or vintage motorsport uses vehicles limited to a particular era. Only safety precautions are modernized in these hobbyist races. A historical event can be of various types of motorsport disciplines, from road racing to rallying. Because it is based on a particular era it is more hobbyist-oriented, reducing corporate sponsorship. The only modern equipment used is related to safety and timing. A historical event can be of a number of different motorsport disciplines.

Some of the most famous events include the Goodwood Festival of Speed and Goodwood Revival in Britain and Monterey Historic in the United States. Championships range from "grass root" Austin Seven racing to the FIA Thoroughbred Grand Prix Championship for classic Formula One chassis. While there are several professional teams and drivers in historical racing, this branch of auto sport tends to be contested by wealthy car owners and is thus more amateur and less competitive in its approach.

=== Other categories ===
- Autocross
- Autograss
- Banger racing
- Board track racing
- Demolition derby
- Dirt speedway racing
- Dirt track racing
- Drifting (motorsport)
- Eco-Marathon
- Electric motorsport
- Folkrace
- High Performance Drivers Education
- Hillclimbing
- Ice racing
- Legends car racing
- Midget car racing
- Mini Sprint
- Monster truck
- Mud bogging
- Power Wheels Racing
- Pickup truck racing
- Rallycross
- Road racing
- Short track motor racing
- Slalom
- Solar car racing
- Sprint car racing
- Street racing
- Swamp Buggy racing
- Track day
- Truck racing
- Wheelstand Competition

== Scoring ==
Each motor racing series has a points system, and a set of rules and regulations that define how points are accrued. Nearly all series award points according to the finishing position of the competitors in each race. Some series only award points for a certain number of finishing positions. In Formula One, for example, only the top ten finishers get points. Drivers may be forced to finish the race or complete a certain number of the laps in order to score points.

In some series, points are also awarded based on lap leading, lap times, overtaking and qualifying positions (in particular by achieving pole positions and fastest laps). In NASCAR, for example, besides receiving points depending on the final standings, one point is awarded for leading a lap and one point for leading the most laps in the race. In other series, such as for the National Hot Rod Association, points are awarded for attempting the race along with a podium finish in any of the four qualifying rounds, as an incentive to have drivers participate week after week to compete.

== Use of flags ==
In many types of auto races, particularly those held on closed courses, flags are displayed to indicate the general status of the track and to communicate instructions to competitors. While individual series have different rules, and the flags have changed from the first years (e.g., red used to start a race), these are generally accepted.

| Flag | Displayed from the start tower | Displayed from the observation post |
|---|---|---|
| Green flag | The session has started or resumed after a full course caution or stop. | End of the hazardous section of the track. |
| Yellow flag | Full course caution condition for ovals. On road courses, it means a local area of caution. Depending on the type of racing, either two yellow flags will be used for a full course caution or a sign with 'SC' (Safety car) will be used as the field follows the pace/safety car on track and no cars may pass. However, if the safety car gives a green light, then the cars behind can pass the safety car (lapped cars only). | Local caution condition —no cars may pass at the particular corner where being displayed. When Stationary indicates hazard off-course, when Waving indicates hazard on-course. |
| Yellow flag with red stripes | Debris, fluid, or other hazard on the track surface. | Debris, fluid, or other hazard on the track surface. |
| Black flag | The car with the indicated number must pit for consultation. | The session is halted, all cars on the course must return to the pit lane. May also be seen combined with a green flag to indicate oil on the track, typically referred to as a 'pickle' flag combination. |
| Meatball flag | The car with the indicated number has mechanical trouble and must pit. | |
| Black and white flag | The driver of the car with the indicated number has been penalized for misbehaviour. | |
| White cross flag | The driver of the car with the indicated number is disqualified or will not be scored until they report to the pits. | |
| Blue flag with yellow stripe | The car should give way to faster traffic. This may be an advisory or an order depending on the series. | A car is being advised or ordered to give way to faster traffic approaching. |
| Red flag | The session is stopped. All cars must halt on the track or return to the pit lane. | |
| White flag | Depending on the series, either one lap remains or a slow vehicle is on the track. | A slow vehicle is on the track. |
| Chequered flag | The session has concluded. | |

== Accidents ==
The worst accident in racing history is the 1955 Le Mans disaster, where more than 80 people died, including the French driver Pierre Levegh.

== Racing-car setup ==
In auto racing, the racing setup or car setup is the set of adjustments made to the vehicle to optimize its behaviour (performance, handling, reliability, etc.). Adjustments can occur in suspensions, brakes, transmissions, engines, tires, and many others.

=== Aerodynamics ===
Aerodynamics and airflow play big roles in the setup of a race car. Aerodynamic downforce improves the race car's handling by lowering the center of gravity and distributing the weight of the car equally on each tire. Once this is achieved, fuel consumption decreases and the forces against the car are significantly lowered. Many aerodynamic experiments are conducted in wind tunnels, to simulate real-life situations while measuring the various drag forces on the car. These "Rolling roads" produce many wind situations and direct air flow at certain speeds and angles. When a diffuser is installed under the car, the amount of drag force is significantly lowered, and the overall aerodynamics of the vehicle is positively adjusted. Wings and canards channel the airflow in the most efficient way to get the least amount of drag from the car. It is experimentally proven that downforce is gained and the vehicle's handling is considerably changed when aerodynamic wings on the front and rear of the vehicle are installed.

=== Suspension ===
Suspension plays a huge part in giving the race car the ability to be driven optimally. Shocks are mounted vertically or horizontally to prevent the body from rolling in the corners. The suspension is important because it makes the car stable and easier to control and keeps the tires on the road when driving on uneven terrain. It works in three different ways including vertically, longitudinally, and laterally to control movement when racing on various tracks.

=== Tires ===
Tires called R-Compounds are commonly used in motorsports for high amounts of traction. The soft rubber allows them to expand when they are heated up, making more surface area on the pavement, therefore producing the most traction. These types of tires do not have grooves on them. Tire pressure is dependent on the temperature of the tire and track when racing. Each time a driver pulls into the pits, the tire pressure and temperature should be tested for optimal performance. When the tires get too hot they will swell or inflate and need to be deflated to the correct pressure. When the tires are not warmed up they will not perform as well.

=== Brakes ===
Brakes on a race car are imperative in slowing and stopping the car at precise times and wear quickly depending on the road or track on which the car is being raced, how many laps are being run, track conditions due to weather, and how many caution runs require more braking. There are three variables to consider in racing: brake pedal displacement, brake pedal force, and vehicle deceleration. Various combinations of these variables work together to determine the stiffness, sensitivity, and pedal force of the brakes. When using the brakes effectively, the driver must go through a buildup phase and end with a modulating phase. These phases include attaining maximum deceleration and modulating the brake pressure. Brake performance is measured in bite and consistency. Bite happens when the driver first applies the brakes and they have not warmed up to the correct temperature to operate efficiently. Consistency is measured in how consistent the friction is during the entire time of braking. These two measurements determine the wear of the brakes.

=== Engine ===
The race car's engine needs a considerable amount of air to produce maximum power. The air intake manifold sucks the air from scoops on the hood and front bumper and feeds it into the engine. Many engine modifications to increase horsepower and efficiency are commonly used in many racing-sanctioning bodies. Engines are tuned on a machine called a dynamometer, which is commonly known in the racing world as a DYNO. The car is driven onto the DYNO and many gauges and sensors are hooked up to the car that are controlled by an online program to test force, torque, or power. Through the testing, the car's engine maps can be changed to get the most horsepower and ultimately speed out of the vehicle.

== Racing drivers ==
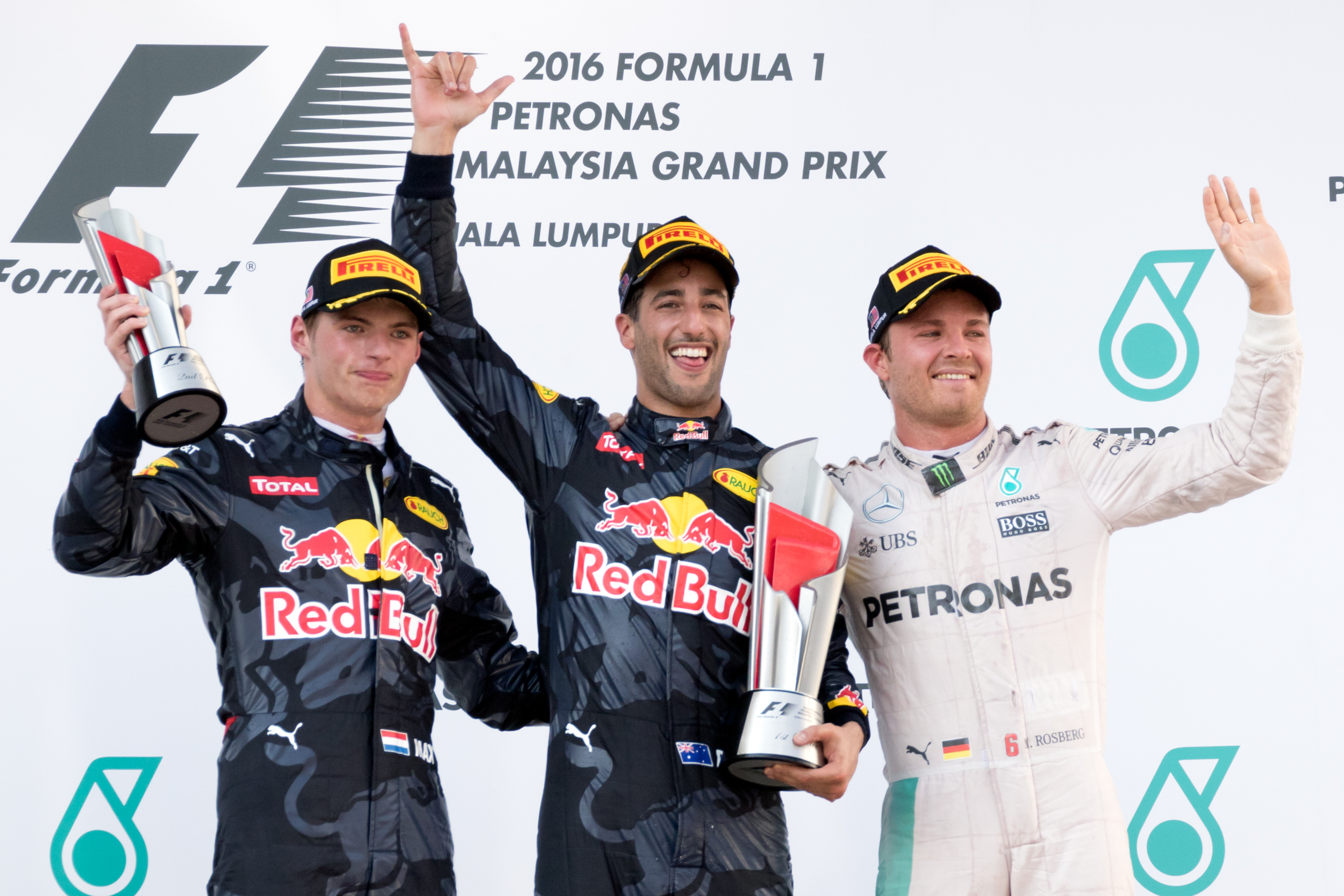
Formula One racing drivers Max Verstappen (left), Daniel Ricciardo (center), and Nico Rosberg (right) celebrate on the podium of the 2016 Malaysian Grand Prix

Racing drivers, at the highest levels, can be paid by the team, or by sponsors, and can command substantial salaries. Drivers who pay for their positions, or seats, within racing teams are typically known as pay drivers, or gentleman drivers. Drivers may also enter events as privateers.

Contrary to popular assumption, racing drivers as a group do not have unusually strong reflexes or peripheral response time. During repeated physiological and psychological evaluations of professional racing drivers, the two characteristics that stand out are racers' near-obsessive need to control their surroundings—psychological—and an unusual ability to process fast-moving information —physiological. Researchers have noted a strong correlation between racing driver psychological profiles and those of fighter pilots. In tests comparing racing drivers to the general public, the greater the complexity of the information processing matrix, the greater the speed gap between the two groups.

Due partly to the performance capabilities of modern racing cars, racing drivers require a high level of fitness, focus, and the ability to concentrate at high levels for long periods in an inherently difficult environment. They are often subject to injuries in the lumbar, shoulder, and neck regions. Racing drivers experience large g-forces due to formula cars and sports prototypes generating high levels of downforce, and being able to corner at high speeds. Formula One drivers routinely experience lateral loads in excess of 4.5 g (44 m/s^{2}; 140 ft/s^{2}), requiring drivers to commit to frequent neck training regimens.

== See also ==
- Outline of auto racing
- List of auto racing tracks
- Motorcycle racing
- Race track
- List of auto racing films
- Racing video game
- Women in motorsport
