= Outline of auto racing =

Overview of and topical guide to auto racing

The following outline is provided as an overview of and topical guide to auto racing:

Auto racing – motorsport involving the racing of cars for competition. Also known as automobile racing or car racing.

== What type of thing is auto racing? ==
Auto racing can be described as all of the following:

- A sport
  - A motorsport
  - A racing sport

== Types of auto racing ==
- Formula racing – Open-wheeled single-seater motorsport
- Touring car racing – Motorsport road racing competition
- Sports car racing – Type of motorsport road racing
- Production car racing – Type of auto racing
- One-make racing – Competition class in sailing, motor racing and gliding
- Stock car racing – Form of automobile racing
- Rallying – Form of motorsport
- Rallycross – Form of sprint style automobile racing
- Off-road racing – Format of racing
- Drag racing – Type of motor racing
- Kart racing – Motorsport using go-karts
- Historical racing – Type of motorsport with vehicles limited to a particular era}
- Shortcar – Type of car racing
- Other

== History of auto racing ==
- History of auto racing
- Driver deaths in motorsport
- Driver and co-driver deaths in rallying events

== Rules and procedures of auto racing ==
- Did not finish
- Homologation
- Hot lap
- Pacenotes
- Pole position
- Racing flags
- Rolling start
- Safety car
- Standing start

== Facilities and equipment of auto racing ==
- Race track
  - Chicane
  - Hairpin turn
  - Run-off area
  - Special stage

== Participants in auto racing ==
- Teams and drivers
  - Co-driver
  - Driver development program
  - Factory-backed
  - Pay driver
  - Privateer
  - Test driver
  - Team orders

== Science of auto racing ==
- Vehicle dynamics
  - Handbrake turn
  - Racing line
  - Grip (auto racing)
  - Understeer and oversteer
  - Racing setup
- Automotive aerodynamics
  - Downforce
  - Drafting
  - Ground effect in cars
  - Spoiler (car)

== Auto racing organizations ==
- Fédération Internationale de l'Automobile
- Fédération Internationale du Sport Automobile
- Motorsport Australia
- Deutscher Motor Sport Bund
- Fédération Française du Sport Automobile
- Automobile Club de l'Ouest
- Motor Sports Association
- NASCAR
- IndyCar
- International Motor Sports Association
- Sports Car Club of America

== Auto racing competitions ==
Formula racing

- Formula One
- Grand Prix motor racing
- Formula E
- Super Formula
- IndyCar Series
- Formula 2
- Formula 3000
- Formula 5000
- Formula 3
- Formula 4

Sports car racing

- FIA World Endurance Championship
- FIA GT Championship
- World Sportscar Championship
- IMSA SportsCar Championship
- American Le Mans Series (defunct; one of the predecessors to today's WeatherTech SportsCar Championship)
- Rolex Sports Car Series (defunct; one of the predecessors to today's WeatherTech SportsCar Championship)
- IMSA GT Championship
- Can-Am
- European Le Mans Series
- WeatherTech SportsCar Championship
- Blancpain GT Series
- Super GT

Touring car racing

- World Touring Car Championship
- European Touring Car Championship
- British Touring Car Championship
- Deutsche Tourenwagen Masters
- Stock Car Brasil
- Supercars Championship
- Turismo Carretera
- TC 2000 Championship

Rallying

- World Rally Championship
- European Rally Championship
- FIA World Rallycross Championship
- FIA Cross-Country Rally World Cup
- Global Rallycross Championship

Other

- Karting World Championship
- NASCAR series:
  - NASCAR Cup Series
  - NASCAR Xfinity Series
  - NASCAR Camping World Truck Series
  - ARCA Racing Series
  - NASCAR Pinty's Series (Canada)
  - NASCAR PEAK Mexico Series
  - NASCAR Whelen Euro Series
- NHRA Mello Yello Drag Racing Series

== Auto racing publications ==
Television

- Motorsport.tv
- Speed
- List of Formula One broadcasters
- List of Indianapolis 500 broadcasters
- NASCAR on television and radio

Radio

- Indianapolis Motor Speedway Radio Network
- Motor Racing Network
- Performance Racing Network
- Radio Le Mans

Print

- Autosport
- GP Racing
- Racer

== Persons influential in auto racing ==
Drivers

- Formula One
  - Sebastian Vettel
  - Lewis Hamilton
  - Kimi Räikkönen
  - Fernando Alonso
  - Mika Häkkinen
  - Damon Hill
  - Michael Schumacher
  - Nigel Mansell
  - Ayrton Senna
  - Alain Prost
  - Nelson Piquet
  - Niki Lauda
  - Emerson Fittipaldi
  - Jackie Stewart
  - Jim Clark
  - Jack Brabham
  - Graham Hill
  - Alberto Ascari
  - John Surtees
  - Juan Manuel Fangio
  - Stirling Moss
  - Giuseppe Farina
  - Tazio Nuvolari
  - Bernd Rosemeyer
- NASCAR
  - Bobby Allison
  - Kyle Busch
  - Dale Earnhardt
  - Jeff Gordon
  - Kevin Harvick
  - Jimmie Johnson
  - David Pearson
  - Lee Petty
  - Richard Petty
  - Tony Stewart
  - Rusty Wallace
  - Darrell Waltrip
  - Cale Yarborough
- Rallying
  - Sébastien Loeb
  - Marcus Grönholm
  - Carlos Sainz
  - Colin McRae
  - Tommi Mäkinen
  - Juha Kankkunen
  - Didier Auriol
  - Markku Alén
  - Hannu Mikkola
  - Massimo Biasion
  - Björn Waldegård
  - Walter Röhrl
  - Mikko Hirvonen
  - Petter Solberg
  - Stig Blomqvist
  - Ari Vatanen
  - Michèle Mouton
  - Stéphane Peterhansel
  - Jean-Louis Schlesser
- IndyCar
  - Mario Andretti
  - Michael Andretti
  - Hélio Castroneves
  - Scott Dixon
  - A. J. Foyt
  - Dario Franchitti
  - Rick Mears
  - Bobby Rahal
  - Johnny Rutherford
  - Al Unser
  - Al Unser Jr.
  - Bobby Unser
  - Alex Zanardi
- Sports cars
  - Derek Bell
  - Frank Biela
  - Rinaldo Capello
  - Yannick Dalmas
  - Romain Dumas
  - Jacky Ickx
  - Tom Kristensen
  - Allan McNish
  - Henri Pescarolo
  - Emanuele Pirro
  - Hans-Joachim Stuck
  - Rolf Stommelen
  - Eric van de Poele
  - Peter Gregg
  - Hurley Haywood
  - Phil Hill
  - Al Holbert
  - Scott Pruett
  - Brian Redman
- Touring cars
  - Yvan Muller
  - Laurent Aïello
  - Fabrizio Giovanardi
  - Roberto Ravaglia
  - Klaus Ludwig
  - Bernd Schneider
  - Peter Brock
  - José María López
  - Ingo Hoffmann

Team owners, directors, and engineers

- Formula One
  - Flavio Briatore
  - Ross Brawn
  - Colin Chapman
  - Giampaolo Dallara
  - Ron Dennis
  - Enzo Ferrari
  - Gordon Murray
  - Tom Walkinshaw
  - Frank Williams
- North America
  - Richard Childress
  - Chip Ganassi
  - Carl Haas
  - Gene Haas
  - Rick Hendrick
  - Roger Penske
  - Jack Roush

Executives

- Jean-Marie Balestre
- Bernie Ecclestone
- Bill France Sr.
- Tony George
- Tony Hulman
- Max Mosley
- Jean Todt

== Specific auto racing teams and constructors ==
Formula One

- Alfa Romeo
- Brabham
- Cooper Car Company
- Ferrari
- Lotus
- McLaren
- Mercedes
- Red Bull Racing
- Renault
- Williams

Sports car racing and rallying

- Citroën World Rally Team
- Ford World Rally Team
- Ford Racing
- Joest Racing
- Maserati
- Nismo
- Peugeot Sport
- Renault Sport
- Toyota Motorsport GmbH
- Porsche
- Volkswagen Motorsport

NASCAR and IndyCar

- All American Racers
- Andretti Autosport
- Chip Ganassi Racing
- Hendrick Motorsports
- Newman/Haas Racing
- Richard Childress Racing
- Roush Fenway Racing
- Team Penske
- Yates Racing

Customer chassis builders

- Cooper Car Company
- Dallara
- Kurtis Kraft
- Lola Cars
- March Engineering
- Mygale

Engine builders

- Advanced Engine Research
- Cosworth
- Coventry Climax
- Judd
- Offenhauser

== See also ==
- Outline of sports
