= Track day =

Day when non-members can use motor racing circuits

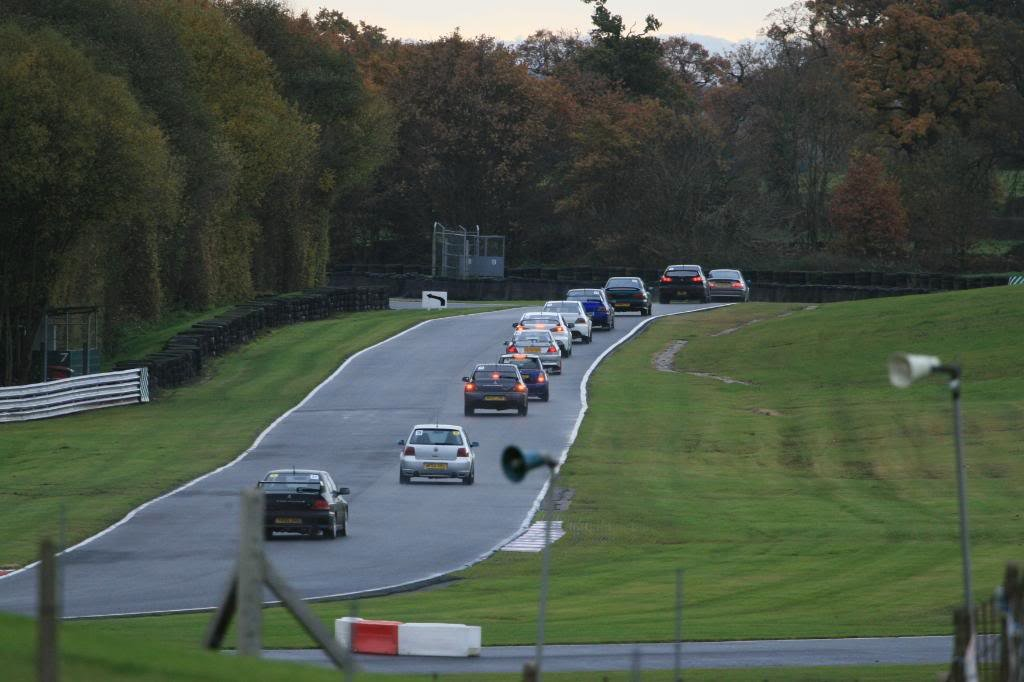
Track days using street-legal motorcycles and cars

A track day is an organised event in which non-members are allowed to drive or ride around established motor racing circuits, or alternatively (though far less common) on closed or disused airfields. Most race tracks around the world now provide this facility, where a road legal or track prepared car or motorcycle can be used without speed restriction (as if racing, though the practice of actual racing is almost exclusively forbidden at these events) by members of the public. Criteria for being eligible to participate is usually the holding of a driving licence for the vehicle in question or the appropriate racing license for the event can also be used and the payment of a fee.

== Formats ==
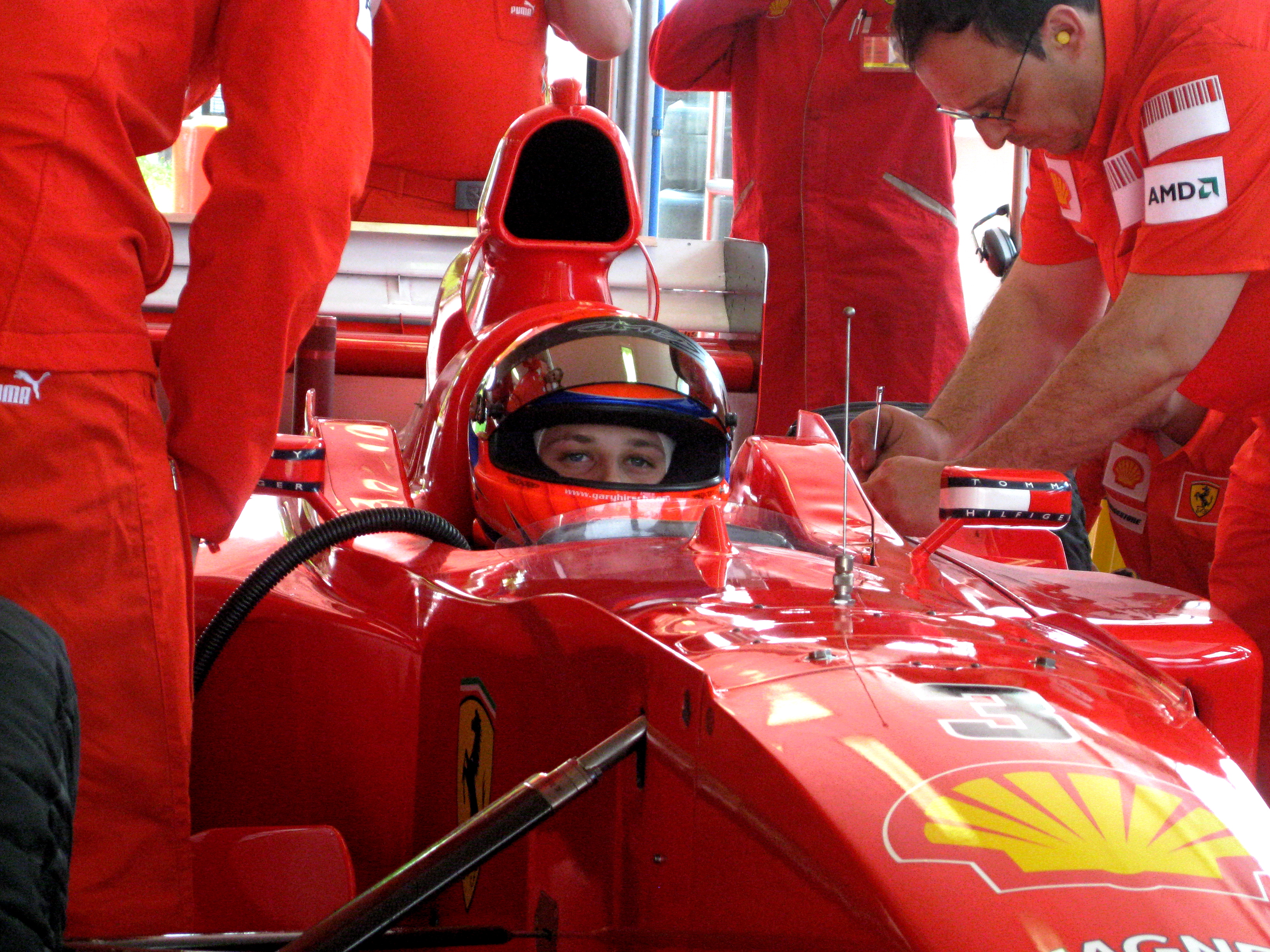
The Swiss driver Gary Hirsch testing the Ferrari F1-2000 in 2008 under the auspices of Ferrari's Corse Clienti, a company where people can pay to drive older Ferrari Formula 1 cars

There are varying formats for the proceedings, but they usually consist of two or three groups loosely corresponding to an individual's level of experience and/or how quick they are, (e.g. novice/intermediate/advanced or beginner/experienced). One group at a time will then take to the track in order that the majority on track at any given time are traveling at similar speed, and there is usually time for a varying number of these sessions throughout the event. Usually, participants use their own vehicles, however a growing number of tracks and organizers can provide hire vehicles if required, while quite often, extra facilities such as instructor guidance, tyre sales and advice and even suspension sales and set-up are available.

== Racing schools ==
Track days are also often held in the guise of racing schools where the emphasis is on nurturing the finer skills of machine control and race craft, often under the tutelage of experienced former racers. Many modern circuits feature dedicated programs, such as Academy 27 at Area 27 Motorsports Park, designed to coach drivers in high-performance vehicle dynamics prior to participating in open track environments. Whatever the interpretation, primarily track days are all about having fun, whether motorbike or car, the emphasis is on enjoyment in a controlled and suitable environment.

== Benefits ==
As the performance of vehicles (especially in relation to motorcycles) increases, the track day can prove an invaluable means of improving the skills necessary to properly control these machines at or nearing their full potential in relative safety. It is a common feedback from track day enthusiasts that it helps them define the massive distinction between road and track riding/driving styles and as a result, through improved skill levels and attitudes, can have a positive effect on their road safety.

== Open pit lane events ==
As riders and drivers become more secure with their abilities and the track environment they can progress to "Open-Pit Lane" events (more common with car track days rather than bike days). These events dispense with the groups format and participants have unlimited access to the circuit throughout the event. This is usually controlled by an organiser by populating the event with fewer participants, albeit usually at a higher price, with instructor guidance facilities usually available.

== Flags ==
Track day marshals will use a number of different colour flags to alert drivers and riders of potential dangers and penalties throughout the day, with each colour or combination of colours meaning something different:

- Yellow. A yellow flag means there is some kind of danger or hazard ahead, so one needs to be extra cautious and vigilant, and must not overtake another driver.
- Red. A red flag means there has been a serious incident and the track day session has been aborted; one must slow down and return to the pits (or where otherwise directed) without overtaking.
- Yellow/Red. A striped yellow and red flag means that either debris has been sighted on the track or that grip is poor, so one must take extra caution.
- Blue. A blue flag means that another vehicle wishes to overtake and one should take caution and let the other vehicle pass when it is safe to do so.
- Black. A black flag can signify one of two things: either the marshals have spotted a problem with one's vehicle (e.g. smoke, oil) or one's behaviour on the track is too aggressive and deemed to be a danger to oneself and/or others; in either case, if one is black-flagged, one must slow down and return to the pits immediately.

== See also ==
- High Performance Driver Education
- Auto racing
