= Deaths in March 2009 =

The following is a list of deaths in March 2009.

Entries for each day are listed alphabetically by surname. A typical entry lists information in the following sequence:

- Name, age, country of citizenship at birth, subsequent country of citizenship (if applicable), reason for notability, cause of death (if known), and reference.

== March 2009 ==
=== 1 ===
- Robert Haggiag, 95, Libyan-born Italian film producer (Candy).
- Ken Henry, 80, American Olympic gold medal-winning (1952) speed skater.
- Charles S. Lieber, 78, Belgian-born American nutritionist, stomach cancer.
- Paolo Maffei, 83, Italian astronomer and science fiction writer.
- Alf Pike, 91, Canadian ice hockey player and head coach (New York Rangers).
- Pepe Rubianes, 61, Spanish Catalan actor and theatre director, lung cancer.
- Eric Simms, 87, British ornithologist, writer and conservationist.
- Joan Turner, 86, British actress.

=== 2 ===
- Ernest Ashworth, 80, American country music singer, member of Grand Ole Opry.
- Michael Baker, 52, Canadian politician, member of the Nova Scotia House of Assembly since 1998, cancer.
- Halit Balamir, appr. 87, Turkish Olympic silver medal-winning (1948) wrestler, myocardial infarction.
- Ernst Benda, 84, German politician, Interior Minister (1968–1969) and President, Federal Constitutional Court (1971–1983).
- Andy Bowman, 74, Scottish footballer (Hearts, Newport County), after long illness.
- Robert Bruce, 65, British-born New Zealand professional wrestler and talent agent, after short illness.
- Chris Finnegan, 64, British boxer, Olympic middleweight champion (1968), complications from pneumonia.
- Joaquín Gutiérrez Cano, 88, Spanish diplomat and politician.
- Anatoliy Klimanov, 59, Ukrainian boxer.
- Alexandre Léontieff, 60, French politician, President of French Polynesia (1987–1991), heart attack.
- Ann Marie Rogers, 57, British activist, campaigner for breast cancer drug Herceptin, breast cancer.
- Jacob T. Schwartz, 79, American mathematician and computer scientist, liver cancer.
- Urban Sea, 20, French racehorse and broodmare, Prix de l'Arc de Triomphe winner (1993), complications during foaling.
- João Bernardo Vieira, 69, Guinea-Bissauan politician, Prime Minister (1978–1980) and President (1980–1999, since 2005), shot.

=== 3 ===
- Sydney Chaplin, 82, American actor.
- Frederick Conyngham, 7th Marquess Conyngham, 84, Irish nobleman, cancer.
- Sebastian Faisst, 20, German handball player, heart failure.
- Flemming Flindt, 72, Danish choreographer, after short illness.
- Frank Ford, 92, American radio talk show host, stroke.
- Åke Lindman, 81, Finnish actor and film director, after long illness.
- Luis Mena Arroyo, 88, Mexican prelate, Auxiliary Bishop of Mexico.
- Gilbert Parent, 73, Canadian politician, Speaker (1994–2001) and Member of Parliament (1974–1984, 1988–2000), colon cancer.
- Barbara Wright, 93, British translator.

=== 4 ===
- Joseph Bloch, 91, American pianist and professor, heart attack.
- John Cephas, 78, American Piedmont blues guitarist, natural causes.
- Yvon Cormier, 70, Canadian professional wrestler, bone marrow cancer.
- Horton Foote, 92, American playwright (The Trip to Bountiful) and screenwriter (To Kill a Mockingbird, Tender Mercies), Oscar winner (1963, 1984).
- Salwa Al Katrib, 55, Lebanese singer and stage actress.
- Patricia De Martelaere, 51, Belgian writer and philosopher, complications of brain tumor.
- George McAfee, 90, American Hall of Fame football player (Chicago Bears) .
- Harry Parkes, 89, British footballer (Aston Villa).
- Vasili Postnov, 46, Tajikistani footballer.
- Salvatore Samperi, 64, Italian film director.
- Triztán Vindtorn, 66, Norwegian poet.

=== 5 ===
- Mario Acuña, 68, Argentinian-born American astrophysicist, multiple myeloma.
- Valeri Broshin, 46, Russian footballer, cancer.
- Francis Essex, 79, British television producer.
- Temima Gezari, 103, American artist, natural causes.
- Thomas T. Goldsmith Jr., 99, American engineer, pioneer of television technology, complications of hip fracture.
- Janez Gradišnik, 91, Slovenian author and translator.
- Mac Henderson, 101, British rugby union player (Scotland) and businessman.
- Jitsuo Inagaki, 80, Japanese politician, illness.
- Oscar Kamau Kingara, 38, Kenyan lawyer and human rights activist, shot.
- Hung-Chang Lin, 89, Chinese-born American inventor, lung cancer.
- John Paul Oulu, Kenyan human rights activist, shot.
- Dave Pureifory, 59, American football player (Detroit Lions), prostate cancer.

=== 6 ===
- Jim Bellows, 86, American newspaper editor, Alzheimer's disease.
- Silvio Cesare Bonicelli, 76, Italian Bishop of Parma.
- James Clyde, Baron Clyde, 77, British judge, Lord of Appeal in Ordinary (1996–2001), cancer.
- Colleen Howe, 76, American sports agent, wife of Gordie Howe, Pick's disease.
- George Keverian, 77, American politician, member (1967–1991) and Speaker (1985–1991) of the Massachusetts House.
- Francis Magalona, 44, Filipino actor and rapper, leukemia.
- Kennedy McIntosh, 60, American basketball player, stroke.
- Vivian Murray, 76, Irish businessman, chairman of An Post and Bord Iascaigh Mhara, after long illness.
- Henri Pousseur, 79, Belgian composer.
- Eduardo Rodríguez, 57, Puerto Rican baseball player, septic shock.
- Christon Tembo, 64, Zambian politician, Vice President (1997–2001).
- Susan Tsvangirai, 50, Zimbabwean wife of Prime Minister Morgan Tsvangirai, car collision.

=== 7 ===
- Steve Bernard, 61, American businessman, founder of Cape Cod Potato Chips, pancreatic cancer.
- Michael Bowen, 71, American artist, complications of poliomyelitis.
- Jimmy Boyd, 70, American actor and singer ("I Saw Mommy Kissing Santa Claus"), cancer.
- Daniel E. Button, 91, American politician, member of the House of Representatives for New York (1967–1971), after long illness.
- Chan Yun, 93, Taiwanese Buddhist monk and teacher of meditation.
- Schuyler Chapin, 86, American general manager of the Metropolitan Opera (1972–1975).
- David Gaiman, 75, British businessman, public relations director for the Church of Scientology, heart attack.
- Jang Ja-yeon, 29, South Korean actress (Boys Over Flowers), suicide by hanging.
- Dmitri Kozlov, 89, Russian aerospace engineer, founder of Progress State Research and Production Space Center.
- Barbara Parker, 62, American novelist, after long illness.
- Tullio Pinelli, 100, Italian screenwriter (La strada).
- Anton Shokh, 49, Ukrainian football player and coach.

=== 8 ===
- Girdhari Lal Bhargava, 73, Indian politician, heart attack.
- Ali Bongo, 79, Indian-born British magician, pneumonia.
- James Allen Keast, 86, Australian ornithologist.
- Willie King, 65, American blues musician, heart attack.
- Hank Locklin, 91, American country music singer, member of Grand Ole Opry.
- Anna Manahan, 84, Irish actress, multiple organ failure.
- Zbigniew Religa, 70, Polish cardiac surgeon and politician, Minister of Health (2005–2007), cancer.
- Robert Soost, 88, American botanist, heart attack.
- Ernest Trova, 82, American artist, heart failure.
- Mary Warburg, 100, American philanthropist.

=== 9 ===
- Timothy Abell, 78, English cricketer and field hockey player.
- Adiele Afigbo, 71, Nigerian historian.
- Hanne Darboven, 68, German artist, lymphoma.
- Rafiqul Islam, 53, Bangladeshi army major general, helicopter crash.
- Eddie Lowe, 83, British footballer and manager.
- Joseph Martin, 84, American Roman Catholic priest, addiction counselor and author, heart disease.
- Larry Regan, 78, Canadian ice hockey player and general manager (Los Angeles Kings), Parkinson's disease.
- Russell Spears, 92, American stonemason, elder of the Narragansett tribe.
- Frank Stockwell, 80, Irish footballer.
- Guillermo Thorndike, 69, Peruvian journalist, writer and editor, co-founder of La República, heart attack.

=== 10 ===
- Brian Barry, 73, British philosopher.
- Denis Begbie, 94, South African cricketer.
- Derek Benfield, 82, British actor.
- Jack Capper, 77, British footballer.
- Dick Daugherty, 79, American football player (Los Angeles Rams).
- Nancy Eiesland, 44, American theologian and author, lung cancer.
- Jack Grimes, 82, American actor and voice actor (Speed Racer).
- Aaron Gural, 91, American real estate executive, pneumonia.
- Tom Hanson, 41, Canadian photojournalist, heart attack.
- George Hedges, 57, American lawyer and archaeologist, melanoma.
- Ralph Mercado, 67, American music promoter (RMM Records & Video), cancer.
- Anel Omar Rodríguez, 47, Panamanian politician, Minister of Culture, shot.
- Michael Shannon, 55, American pediatrician.

=== 11 ===
- Paul W. Airey, 85, American Chief Master Sergeant of the Air Force (1967–1969), complications from heart failure.
- Péter Bacsó, 81, Hungarian film director, after long illness.
- Frances Blaisdell, 97, American flautist.
- Arthur Code, 85, American astronomer, complications of lung condition.
- María Luisa Dehesa Gómez Farías, 96, Mexican architect.
- Izaac Hindom, 74, Indonesian bureaucrat and politician, pulmonary embolism.
- Charles Lewis Jr., 45, American businessman, co-founder of mixed martial arts apparel company Tapout, car accident.
- Grady Lewis, 91, American basketball player, executive with Converse.
- Liang Baozhu, 77, Singaporean actor, pneumonia.
- Harvey Lowe, 90, Canadian broadcaster and yo-yo world champion, after long illness.

=== 12 ===
- Leonore Annenberg, 91, American philanthropist, Chief of Protocol of the United States (1981–1982), natural causes.
- Kalman Bloch, 95, American clarinetist.
- Yann Brekilien, 88, French author, Breton language advocate.
- Jesús Elizondo, 78, Mexican Olympic shooter.
- Martin Knowlton, 88, American adult education innovator, founder of Elderhostel.
- Reginald C. Lindsay, 63, American jurist, member of the District Court for Massachusetts since 1993, after long illness.
- Milan Stitt, 68, American playwright.
- Ferenc Szabó, 88, Hungarian footballer (Ferencvárosi TC).
- Huw Thomas, 81, Welsh broadcaster.
- Blanca Varela, 82, Peruvian poet.
- David Wood, 86, British Army officer, last surviving platoon commander of the Pegasus Bridge operation during World War II.

=== 13 ===
- Medferiashwork Abebe, 84, Ethiopian royal.
- Claude Black, 92, American civil rights advocate, after long illness.
- Betsy Blair, 85, American actress (Marty), cancer.
- Claude Brinegar, 82, American politician, United States Secretary of Transportation (1973–1975), natural causes.
- Anne Brown, 96, American-born Norwegian opera singer.
- William Davidson, 86, American businessman, owner of the Detroit Pistons, Tampa Bay Lightning.
- Milou Ebb, 74, French Polynesian politician.
- Endal, 13, British service dog, stroke.
- Keith Herber, 60, American role-playing game designer.
- Alan W. Livingston, 91, American music executive, President of Capitol Records, creator of Bozo the clown.
- James Purdy, 94, American novelist, poet and playwright.
- Medet Sadyrkulov, 55, Kyrgyz politician, car crash.
- Andrew Saunders, 77, British civil servant.
- Test, 33, Canadian professional wrestler (WWE), accidental overdose.

=== 14 ===
- Alain Bashung, 61, French singer, composer and actor, lung cancer.
- Edith Lucie Bongo, 45, Congolese wife of Gabon President Omar Bongo, after long illness.
- Altovise Davis, 65, American actress and dancer, widow of Sammy Davis Jr., stroke.
- Terence Edmond, 69, British actor (Z-Cars), bronchiectasis.
- Ronald Max Hartwell, 88, Australian economic historian.
- Citizen Kafka, 61, American broadcaster and musician.
- Millard Kaufman, 92, American screenwriter (Bad Day at Black Rock), co-creator of Mr. Magoo.
- Abdul Rahman Khleifawi, 78–79, Syrian politician, Prime Minister (1971–1972, 1976–1978).
- Patrick Kinna, 95, British stenographer to Winston Churchill.
- Jeff Komlo, 52, American football player, fugitive, car crash.
- Robin Mukherjee, 65, Indian cricketer.
- Coy Watson Jr., 96, American silent film child actor, stomach cancer.

=== 15 ===
- Jumadi Abdi, 26, Indonesian footballer.
- Nikolai Afanasyev, 92, Russian firearms designer.
- Richard Aoki, 71, American civil rights activist.
- Miguel Bernad, 91, Filipino Jesuit priest, academician and writer.
- Billy C. Clark, 80, American writer.
- Edmund Hockridge, 89, Canadian singer and actor.
- Pirkle Jones, 95, American photojournalist.
- Paulo Eduardo Andrade Ponte, 77, Brazilian Roman Catholic prelate, Archbishop of São Luís do Maranhão.
- Michael Quinn, 86, American Lasallian brother and psychology professor, President of Saint Mary's College (1962–1969).
- William Schwartz, 86, American nephrologist.
- Ron Silver, 62, American actor (Ali, Timecop, The West Wing) and political activist, Tony winner (1988), esophageal cancer.
- Alan Suddick, 64, British footballer, cancer.
- Shinkichi Tajiri, 85, American-born Dutch sculptor.
- Gunnar Tjörnebo, 81, Swedish steeplechase athlete.
- Elmer Weingartner, 90, American baseball player.
- Harry Zachariah, 97, Australian cricketer.
- Lionel Ziprin, 84, American poet, chronic obstructive pulmonary disease.

=== 16 ===
- Bill Burns, 75, Australian politician.
- Roland Dantes, 67, Filipino film actor and martial arts instructor, heart failure.
- Carolyn Dezurik, 90, American country musician.
- Franz Feldinger, 80, Austrian Olympic footballer.
- Marjorie Grene, 98, American philosopher, after short illness.
- Sir Nicholas Henderson, 89, British diplomat.
- Nicholas Hughes, 47, American marine biologist, son of Sylvia Plath and Ted Hughes, suicide by hanging.
- Jack Lawrence, 96, American songwriter, complications from fall.
- Miljenko Licul, 62, Slovenian graphic designer.
- Ramón Mantilla Duarte, 83, Colombian Bishop of Ipiales (1985–1987).
- Popcorn Sutton, 62, American moonshiner, suspected suicide by carbon monoxide poisoning.

=== 17 ===
- Lester Davenport, 77, American blues musician, prostate cancer.
- Edith Hahn Beer, 95, Austrian author, Holocaust survivor, natural causes.
- Clodovil Hernandes, 71, Brazilian fashion stylist, politician and television presenter, stroke.
- Morton Lachman, 90, American television writer and producer (The Bob Hope Show, All in the Family, Gimme a Break!), complications from diabetes and heart attack.
- Whitey Lockman, 82, American baseball player (San Francisco Giants), pulmonary complications.
- Jane Mayhall, 90, American poet.
- Dale Memmelaar, 72, American football player (Cleveland Browns)
- Roi Wilson, 87, British Royal Navy officer.

=== 18 ===
- Eddie Bo, 78, American singer and pianist, heart attack.
- Ed Callahan, 79, American credit union administrator, blood complications.
- Gianni Giansanti, 52, Italian photographer, bone cancer.
- Des Healey, 81, Australian rules footballer.
- Kent Henry, 59, American guitarist.
- Lil E. Tee, 20, American racehorse, Kentucky Derby winner (1992), euthanized.
- Yeremey Parnov, 73, Russian writer.
- Moultrie Patten, 89, American actor (Northern Exposure) and jazz musician, pneumonia,
- Pocholo Ramirez, 76, Filipino race car driver and television host, cancer.
- Natasha Richardson, 45, British actress (Cabaret, The Parent Trap, Maid in Manhattan), Tony winner (1998), epidural hematoma.
- Luis Rojas Mena, 91, Mexican Roman Catholic prelate, Bishop of Culiacán (1969–1993).
- Glenn Sundby, 87, American gymnast, co-founder of USA Gymnastics, founder of International Gymnastics Hall of Fame.
- Donald Tolmie, 85, Canadian politician, MP for Welland (1965–1972).
- Earl Wood, 97, American physiologist, co-inventor of the G-suit.

=== 19 ===
- Paul Angelis, 66, English actor and writer (Z-Cars, Porridge, Yellow Submarine)
- Felipe Santiago Benítez Ávalos, 82, Paraguayan archbishop of Asunción.
- Maria Bergson, 95, American architect and designer.
- Alastair Boyd, 7th Baron Kilmarnock, 81, British aristocrat, writer and politician.
- Ion Dolănescu, 65, Romanian singer and politician, heart attack.
- Ezio Flagello, 78, American opera singer, heart failure.
- Harry Harris, 86, American television director (Fame, Falcon Crest), myelodysplasia.

=== 20 ===
- Joseph Albright, 70, American jurist, member of the West Virginia Supreme Court of Appeals, esophageal cancer.
- Roberta Alison, 65, American tennis player, injuries sustained in fire.
- Bill Bogash, 92, American roller derby skater, respiratory failure.
- Mel Brown, 69, American blues guitarist, emphysema.
- Abdellatif Filali, 81, Moroccan politician, Prime Minister (1994–1998).
- Vicente Gandía, 84, Mexican artist of Spanish origin, heart attack.
- Janet Irwin, 85, New Zealand medical practitioner.
- Karen Obediear, 46, American child actress (Fawn Story, The Texas Wheelers, Sybil), plane crash.
- Jaroslav Pitner, 83, Czech ice hockey coach.
- Vladimir Savčić, 60, Serbian singer, cancer.
- Pierre Skawinski, 96, French Olympic sprinter.
- George Weber, 47, American radio broadcaster, stabbed.
- Václav Winter, 84, Czech Olympic athlete.
- Albina Yelkina, 76, Soviet Olympic athlete.

=== 21 ===
- Bob Arbogast, 81, American radio and television personality, lung cancer.
- Beach Towel, 22, American harness racehorse, Harness Horse of the Year (1990), colic.
- John Cater, 77, British actor.
- Drummond Erskine, 89, American actor (Late Show with David Letterman).
- Winifred Foley, 94, British writer.
- John Franklyn-Robbins, 84, British actor.
- Doug Frith, 64, Canadian MP for Sudbury (1980–1988), Minister of Indian Affairs and Northern Development (1984), heart attack.
- Joseph Jasgur, 89, American photographer, natural causes.
- Vladimir Kuchmiy, 61, Russian newspaper chief editor (Sport Express).
- Genoveva Matute, 94, Filipino writer.
- Walt Poddubny, 49, Canadian ice hockey player (New York Rangers, Edmonton Oilers).
- Khadijeh Saqafi, 95, Iranian widow of religious/political leader Ruhollah Khomeini, after long illness.

=== 22 ===
- Frank Bogert, 99, American politician, Mayor of Palm Springs, California (1958–1966, 1982–1988).
- Timothy Brinton, 79, British newsreader and politician, MP (1979–1987).
- Awilda Carbia, 71, Puerto Rican actress, comedian, impersonator and television personality, pneumonia.
- Ralph Cooperman, 81, British Olympic fencer.
- Steve Doll, 48, American professional wrestler, blood clot.
- Jade Goody, 27, British television personality (Big Brother), cervical cancer.
- Archie Green, 91, Canadian-born American folklorist and musicologist, renal failure.
- John L. Harper, 73, British biologist.
- Reg Isidore, 59, Aruban drummer (Robin Trower, Peter Green), heart attack,
- Howard Komives, 67, American basketball player (New York Knicks, Detroit Pistons), natural causes.
- Guman Mal Lodha, 83, Indian judge and politician.
- Aubrey Mayhew, 81, American music producer.
- Abismo Negro, 37, Mexican lucha libre professional wrestler, drowned.
- Kanta Rao, 85, Indian actor, liver cancer.
- Geoffrey Sherman, 93, British Royal Marines officer, organised the ceremony for the Japanese surrender in 1945.
- Aldo Vagnozzi, 83, American politician, member of the Michigan House of Representatives (2002–2006), cancer.
- Leon Walker, 20, British rugby league player (Wakefield Trinity Wildcats), natural causes.

=== 23 ===
- Manuel del Rosario, 93, Filipino Bishop of Malolos (1962–1977), pneumonia.
- Geoff Holmes, 50, British cricketer.
- Raúl Macías, 74, Mexican former NBA (now WBA) world bantamweight champion boxer, cancer.
- Xavier Maniguet, 62, French intelligence agent, involved in the sinking of the Rainbow Warrior, plane crash.
- Freddie Mwila Jr., 34, Zambian footballer.
- Billy Rackard, 78, Irish hurler and Gaelic footballer.
- Lloyd Ruby, 81, American auto racing driver.
- Ronald Tavel, 72, American playwright, heart attack.
- Tonda, 50, American Sumatran-born orangutan, oldest in captivity in United States.
- Peter Wherrett, 72, Australian motoring journalist, cancer.

=== 24 ===
- Robert Delford Brown, 78, American artist, drowned (body found on this date).
- Irina Gabashvili, 48, Georgian-born American gymnast, cancer.
- Uriel Jones, 74, American drummer (The Funk Brothers), complications from heart attack.
- George Kell, 86, American baseball player (Detroit Tigers) and broadcaster, member of the Baseball Hall of Fame.
- Hans Klenk, 89, German racing driver.
- Denis Miller, 90, New Zealand airline and bomber pilot.
- Gábor Ocskay, 33, Hungarian ice hockey player, heart attack.
- Laurie Short, 93, Australian trade union leader.
- Igor Stelnov, 46, Russian ice hockey player (HC CSKA Moscow), 1986 world champions team member, after long illness.

=== 25 ===
- Frank Adams, 76, British footballer.
- Steven Bach, 70, American film producer and author, cancer.
- Johnny Blanchard, 76, American baseball player (New York Yankees), heart attack.
- Marilyn Borden, 76, American actress (I Love Lucy), heart failure.
- Bob Boucher, 68, British academic.
- David P. Cooley, 49, American test pilot and air force officer, plane crash.
- Donald W. Duncan, 79, American soldier and antiwar activist.
- Yukio Endō, 72, Japanese gymnast, esophageal cancer.
- John Hope Franklin, 94, American historian, Presidential Medal of Freedom recipient, heart failure.
- Mari Kapi, 58, Papua New Guinean judge, Chief Justice of the Supreme Court (2003–2008), kidney failure.
- Kosuke Koyama, 79, Japanese-born American theologian, pneumonia.
- Manny Oquendo, 78, American percussionist (Tito Puente, Tito Rodríguez), heart attack.
- Giovanni Parisi, 41, Italian Olympic featherweight champion boxer (1988), car accident.
- Arthur Richman, 83, American baseball executive (New York Yankees, New York Mets) and writer (New York Daily Mirror).
- Dan Seals, 61, American country music singer-songwriter (England Dan & John Ford Coley), mantle cell lymphoma.
- Michael Ward, 77, British politician, MP for Peterborough (1974–1979).
- Muhsin Yazıcıoğlu, 54, Turkish politician, founder of the Great Union Party, helicopter crash.

=== 26 ===
- Griselda Álvarez, 95, Mexican politician and writer, Governor of Colima (1979–1985), natural causes.
- Arne Bendiksen, 82, Norwegian singer, composer and record producer, heart failure.
- Kim Bradley, 53, Australian surfer.
- Gus Cifelli, 84, American football player (Detroit Lions), natural causes.
- Ed Earle, 81, American basketball player.
- Larry Glick, 87, American talk radio host (WBZ), complications from cardiac surgery.
- Edmund Lawson, 60, British barrister, stroke.
- Wayne Lewellen, 65, American film studio executive (Paramount), cancer.
- John Mayhew, 61, British drummer (Genesis), heart failure.
- Shane McConkey, 39, Canadian extreme skier, base jumping accident.
- Bob Scott, 70, British conservationist and ornithologist, cancer.
- Ivan Wyatt, 85, New Zealand cricketer.

=== 27 ===
- Alysheba, 25, American racehorse, Kentucky Derby and Preakness winner (1987), euthanized.
- Maxim Bazylev, 28, Russian nationalist militant, suicide.
- Sandra Cantu, 8, American homicide victim.
- Jack Dreyfus, 95, American financier, pioneer of mutual funds.
- Evert Grift, 86, Dutch Olympic cyclist.
- Merle Hansen, 89, American civil rights activist, founding president of the North American Farm Alliance.
- Dorothy Kelly, 79, American educator, President of the College of New Rochelle, heart attack.
- Irving R. Levine, 86, American journalist (NBC news), prostate cancer.
- Arnold Meri, 89, Estonian Red Army World War II veteran.
- Penor Rinpoche, 77, Tibetan religious leader (Nyingma Buddhist tradition).

=== 28 ===
- Earle Brucker Jr., 83, American baseball player.
- Peter F. Donnelly, 70, American arts patron, vice-chairman of Americans for the Arts, complications of pancreatic cancer.
- Inger Lise Gjørv, 70, Norwegian politician, cancer.
- Janet Jagan, 88, American-born Guyanese President (1997–1999), abdominal aortic aneurysm.
- Hugh Kelly, 85, British footballer (Blackpool), pneumonia.
- Martin J. Klein, 84, American historian and physicist.
- Helmut Noller, 89, German Olympic sprint canoer.
- Jorge Preloran, 76, Argentine filmmaker, prostate cancer.

=== 29 ===
- Bazgul Badakhshi, 107, Afghan musician and singer.
- Ivor Dent, 85, Canadian Mayor of Edmonton (1968–1974), Alzheimer's disease.
- Vladimir Fedotov, 66, Russian footballer and manager, Soviet Top League leading goalscorer (1964).
- Monte Hale, 89, American country musician and actor (Giant).
- Andy Hallett, 33, American actor (Angel), heart disease.
- Maurice Jarre, 84, French film composer (Lawrence of Arabia, Doctor Zhivago, Ghost), Oscar winner (1963, 1966, 1985), cancer.
- Helen Levitt, 95, American photographer, respiratory failure.
- Miroslav Moravec, 70, Czech actor, cancer.
- Earl Paulk, 81, American pastor, implicated in several sex scandals, cancer.
- Lou Saban, 87, American football player (Cleveland Browns) and coach (Boston Patriots, Buffalo Bills), complications from fall.
- Kanwaljit Singh, 67, Indian politician, traffic accident.
- Helvecia Viera, 80, Chilean comedian and actress, stroke.
- Gerrit Viljoen, 82, South African politician, Administrator-General of South-West Africa (1978–1980).

=== 30 ===
- Shirl Bernheim, 87, American actress.
- Burton Blumert, 80, American president of the Center for Libertarian Studies, chairman of Mises Institute, cancer.
- Eugène Drenthe, 83, Surinamese playwright and poet.
- Herman Franks, 95, American baseball manager, heart failure.
- Andrea Mead Lawrence, 76, American alpine skier, cancer.
- Eric Munoz, 61, American politician, member of the New Jersey General Assembly since 2001, complications of cardiac surgery.
- Jackie Pretorius, 74, South African racing driver, assault during home invasion.
- David Scott, 92, American art historian.
- George Stoddard, 92, American financier, natural causes.
- Loras Joseph Watters, 93, American Roman Catholic prelate, Bishop of Winona (1969–1986).
- Sulim Yamadayev, 35, Russian military commander and Chechen warlord, shot.

=== 31 ===
- Raúl Alfonsín, 82, Argentine President (1983–1989), lung cancer.
- Jarl Alfredius, 66, Swedish journalist, prostate cancer.
- John Atkins, 92, British writer.
- Marga Barbu, 80, Romanian actress.
- Michael Cox, 60, British novelist, cancer.
- Paul E. Davis, 87, American college football coach.
- Emory Elliott, 66, American academic, heart attack.
- A. F. Golam Osmani, 76, Indian politician, lung cancer.
- Hong Song-nam, 79, North Korean politician, Premier (1997–2003).
- Gordon Kerr, 91, Canadian Olympic swimmer.
- Choor Singh, 98, Singaporean jurist, member of the Supreme Court of Singapore (1963–1980).
- Sir Reresby Sitwell, 81, British aristocrat and writer.
