= 1915 in the United Kingdom =

Events from the year 1915 in the United Kingdom. The year was dominated by the First World War, which broke out in the August of the previous year.

== Incumbents ==
- Monarch – George V
- Prime Minister – H. H. Asquith (Liberal until 25 May, Coalition starting 25 May)

== Events ==
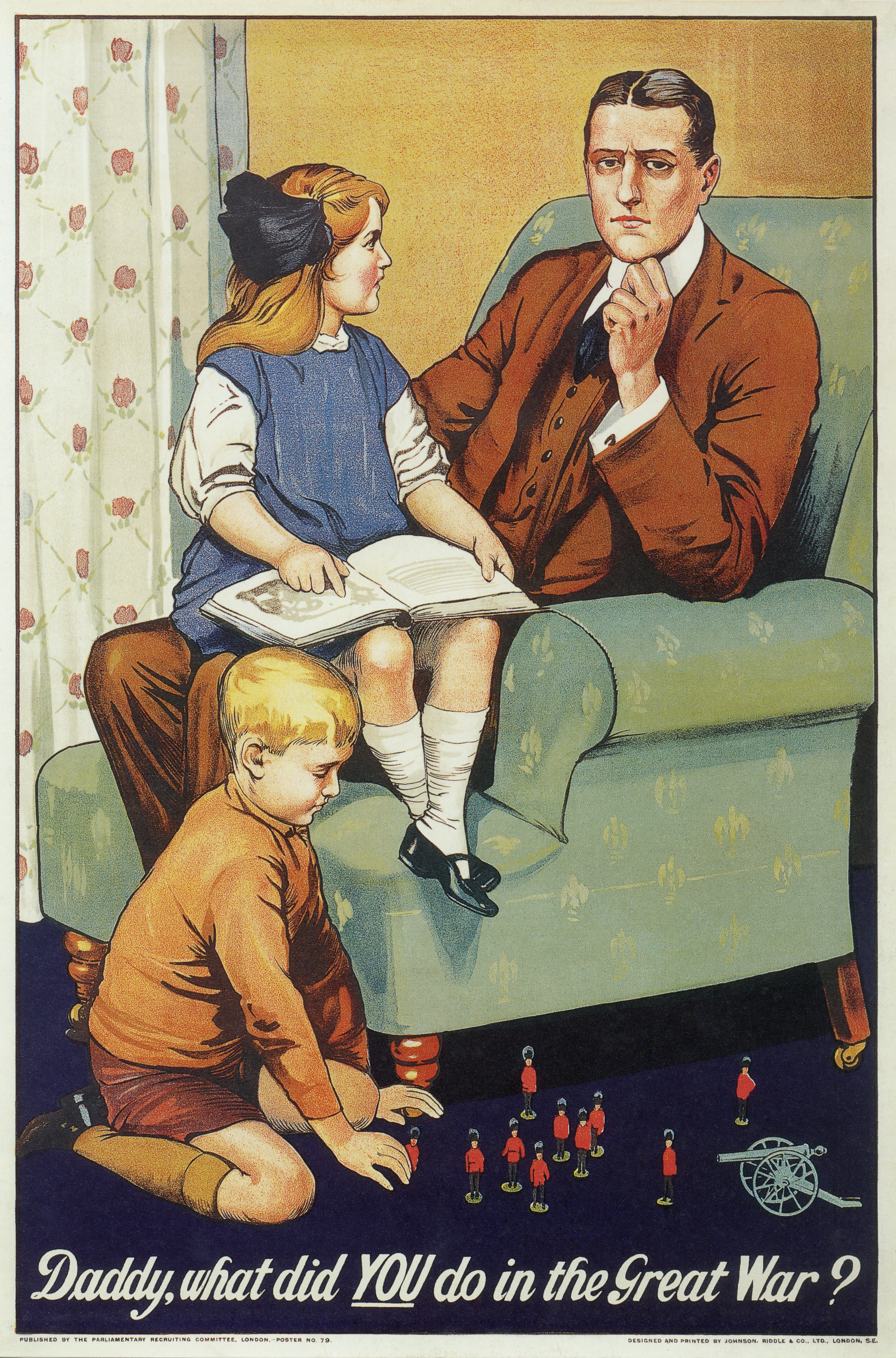
1915 propaganda poster

- 1 January – World War I: sinking of the battleship HMS Formidable, off Lyme Regis, Dorset, by an Imperial German Navy U-boat. 35 officers and 512 men are lost out of a total complement of 780.
- 19 January – World War I: German Zeppelins bomb the towns of Great Yarmouth and King's Lynn for the first time, killing more than twenty.
- 24 January – World War I: Battle of Dogger Bank: British Grand Fleet defeats the German High Seas Fleet, sinking the armoured cruiser SMS Blücher.
- January – HMS Queen Elizabeth enters service as the Royal Navy's first oil-fired battleship.
- 1 February – photographs required in British passports for the first time.
- 18 February – World War I: Germany regards waters around the British Isles to be a war zone from this date, as part of its U-boat campaign.
- March – World War I: Option to enlist in the Territorial Force for home service only is abolished and the first complete territorial division to be deployed to the Western Front arrives in France.
- 7 March – World War I: British collier SS Bengrove is torpedoed and sunk in the Bristol Channel 5 nautical miles (9.3 km) north east of Ilfracombe, Devon, by SM U-20, with all 33 crew rescued.
- 11 March – World War I: Sinking of armed merchantman HMS Bayano (1914) off Galloway by German U-boat SM U-27. Around 200 crew are lost, a number of bodies being washed up on the Isle of Man, with only 26 saved.
- 14 March – World War I:
  - Battle of Más a Tierra: Off the coast of Chile, the Royal Navy forces the German light cruiser SMS Dresden to scuttle.
  - Britain, France and the Russian Empire agree to give Constantinople and the Bosporus to Russia in case of victory (the treaty is later nullified by the Bolshevik Revolution).
- 18 March – World War I:
  - Gallipoli campaign; British naval attack on the Dardanelles fails.
  - Royal Navy battleship HMS Dreadnought (1906) sinks German submarine U-29 with all hands in the Pentland Firth by ramming her, the only time this tactic is known to have been successfully used by a battleship.
- 24 April – the FA Cup is won by Sheffield United F.C., who defeat Chelsea 3–0 in the final at Old Trafford, Manchester. The competition will now be abandoned until the war is over.
- 25 April – World War I: Gallipoli Campaign: Landing at Cape Helles by British and French forces, heavily opposed by Ottoman troops. The Lancashire Fusiliers win 'six VCs before breakfast'.
- 3 May – the oldest continually operational Royal Air Force station, RAF Northolt (on the edge of London), opens as the home to the Royal Flying Corps' No. 4 Reserve Aeroplane Squadron.
- 7 May – World War I: Sinking of the RMS Lusitania: British ocean liner RMS Lusitania is sunk by Imperial German Navy U-boat U-20 off the south-west coast of Ireland, killing 1,198 civilians en route from New York to Liverpool.
- 17 May – the last purely Liberal government ends when Prime Minister H. H. Asquith decides to form an all-party coalition, precipitated by reports in the Northcliffe press of deficiencies in the supply of shells for the army following the 9 May British defeat at the Battle of Aubers Ridge.
- 22 May – Quintinshill rail disaster near Gretna Green in Scotland: collision and fire kill 226, mostly troops, the largest number of fatalities in a rail accident in the U.K.
- 25 May – the Prime Minister forms the Asquith coalition ministry, a national wartime coalition government of twelve Liberals, eight Unionists and one Labour member (Arthur Henderson). David Lloyd George is appointed first Minister of Munitions.
- 27 May – HMS Princess Irene explodes and sinks while loading mines off Sheerness with the loss of 352 lives.

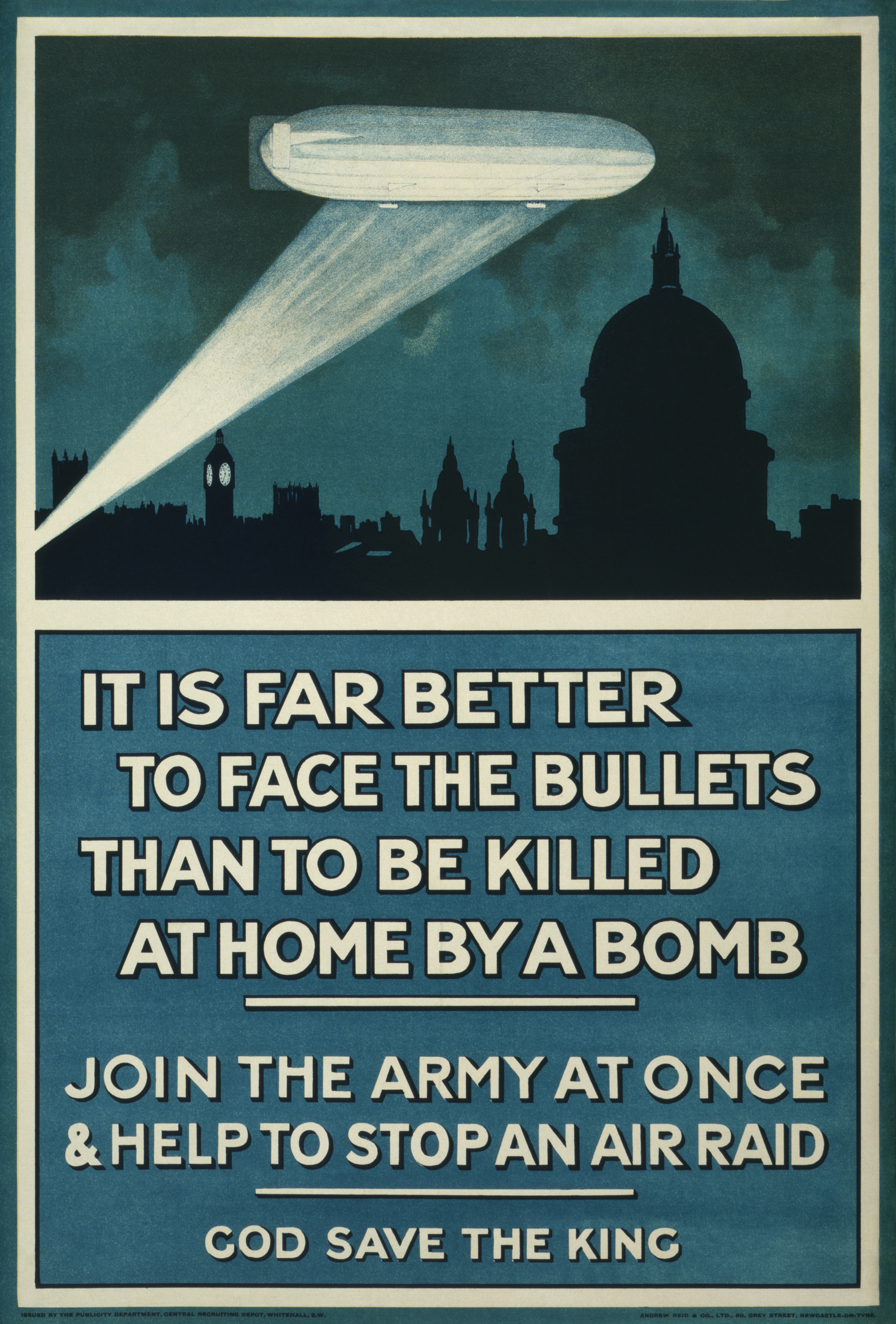
1915 propaganda poster

- 31 May – World War I: Zeppelins effectively raid London for the first time, killing seven.
- 10 June – Vorticist exhibition opens at the Doré Gallery, London.
- 16 June – Women's Institutes organisation set up in Britain.
- 4 July – German aviator Gunther Plüschow escapes from an officers' prisoner-of-war camp at Donington Hall in Leicestershire and successfully makes his way home to Germany, the only enemy combatant in either World War to do so.
- 8 July – National Registration Act: All citizens (men and women) aged 15–65 to be registered on 15 August.
- 14 July – beginning of McMahon–Hussein Correspondence in which, in exchange for assistance against the Ottoman Empire, the British offer Hussein bin Ali, Sharif of Mecca, their recognition of an independent Arab kingdom, although clear terms are never agreed.
- 17 July – the "Women's Great Procession" (also known as the "War Service Procession" or "Right to Serve March") is organised in London by the Women's Social and Political Union led by Emmeline Pankhurst to demonstrate that women should work in munitions and other areas where they could replace men.
- August
  - Munitions of War Act places munitions factories and their labour relations under control of the Minister of Munitions.
  - Edith Smith in Grantham becomes the country's first woman police officer granted full power of arrest.
- 16 August – World War I: a German U-boat shells the north-west coast of England in an attack on the chemical plant at Lowca.
- 6 September – Little Willie, the prototype military tank developed by William Foster & Co. of Lincoln, is first tested by the British Army.
- 15 September – Pommern completes the English Triple Crown by finishing first in the 2,000 Guineas, Derby and (substitute) St Leger.
- 16 September – first Women's Institute meeting held in Llanfairpwllgwyngyll, Wales. The first meeting in England is that of the Singleton Institute at Charlton, West Sussex on 9 November.
- 21 September – Cecil Chubb acquires Stonehenge at an auction for £6600.
- 25 September–14 October – World War I: Battle of Loos: British forces take the French town of Loos but with substantial casualties and are unable to press their advantage. This is the first time the British use poison gas in World War I and also the first large-scale use of 'New' or Kitchener's Army units. Three Members of Parliament are killed during the battle.
- October–November – World War I: Derby Scheme, a voluntary military recruitment scheme.
- 12 October – World War I: British nurse Edith Cavell is executed by a German firing squad for helping Allied soldiers escape from Belgium.
- 20 October – women are officially permitted to act as bus and tram conductors for the duration of the War; but have been employed in Glasgow and other places in the U.K. since April.
- 12 November – William Henry Bragg and his son William Lawrence Bragg win the Nobel Prize in Physics "For their services in the analysis of crystal structure by means of X-rays."
- 24 November – Bruce Bairnsfather's "Fragments from France" cartoon featuring "Old Bill" saying "Well, if you knows of a better 'ole, go to it" is published in the Bystander.
- 27 November – Government introduces legislation to restrict housing rents to their pre-war level following Glasgow rent strikes led by Mary Barbour.
- 10 December – World War I: Douglas Haig is appointed to succeed John French in command of the British Expeditionary Force.
- 30 December – armoured cruiser HMS Natal (1905) capsizes at anchor in the Cromarty Firth as the result of an internal explosion in her ammunition stores; 390 sailors and some civilians are killed.

== Publications ==
- Rupert Brooke's collection 1914 & Other Poems (including the sonnet "The Soldier") (posthumous).
- John Buchan's novel The Thirty-nine Steps.
- Arthur Conan Doyle's Sherlock Holmes novel The Valley of Fear.
- Ford Madox Ford's novel The Good Soldier.
- D. H. Lawrence's novel The Rainbow (suppressed after prosecution for obscenity).
- W. Somerset Maugham's novel Of Human Bondage.
- Dorothy Richardson's stream of consciousness novel Pointed Roofs.
- P. G. Wodehouse's first Blandings Castle novel, Something Fresh.

== Births ==
- 4 January – Meg Mundy, actress (died 2016)
- 6 January – Alan Watts, Zen Buddhist philosopher (died 1973)
- 12 January – Norman Cohn, historian (died 2007)
- 18 January – Sir Ralph Verney, 5th Baronet, soldier and conservationist (died 2001)
- 23 January – Arthur Lewis, economist, Nobel Prize laureate (died 1991)
- 27 January – Jack Brymer, clarinettist (died 2003)
- 30 January – John Profumo, cabinet minister (died 2006)
- 1 February – Stanley Matthews, footballer (died 2000)
- 4 February – Norman Wisdom, comedian, singer and actor (died 2010)
- 5 February – John Bridge, World War II sailor (died 2006)
- 8 February – Peter Hill-Norton, admiral (died 2004)
- 11 February
  - Patrick Leigh Fermor, travel writer and soldier (died 2011)
  - Harry Walker, rugby union player (died 2018)
- 16 February – Michael Relph, film producer and director (died 2004)
- 18 February – Phyllis Calvert, actress (died 2002)
- 19 February – John Freeman, politician and television presenter (died 2014)
- 9 March – Johnnie Johnson, fighter pilot (died 2001)
- 19 March – Nancy Evans, opera singer (died 2000)
- 23 March – Arthur Owen, racing driver (died 2002)
- 28 March – Jeremy Hutchinson, Baron Hutchinson of Lullington, defence lawyer (died 2017)
- 29 March – George Chisholm, jazz musician (died 1997)
- 31 March – Albert Hourani, historian (died 1993)
- 6 April – Geoffrey Sherman, Royal Marines officer (died 2009)
- 17 April – Bertram James, fighter pilot (died 2008)
- 23 April – Arnold Alexander Hall, aeronautical engineer and scientist (died 2000)
- 24 April – Michael Carver, Army general (died 2001)
- 25 April – John James Cowperthwaite, civil servant (died 2006)
- 27 April – Eric Kemp, theologian and Bishop of Chichester (died 2009)
- 2 May – Peggy Mount, actress (died 2001)
- 5 May – Ben Wright, actor (died 1989)
- 6 May – Sydney Carter, poet and songwriter (died 2004)
- 8 May
  - John George Macleod, doctor (died 2006)
  - Brian Pearce, Marxist historian and translator (died 2008)
- 10 May
  - John Egerton, 6th Duke of Sutherland, Scottish peer (died 2000)
  - Denis Thatcher, England businessman and married to Prime Minister Margaret Thatcher (died 2003)
- 13 May – John Habakkuk, economic historian (died 2002)
- 14 May – John Challens, scientist (died 2002)
- 15 May – Hilda Bernstein, English-born author, artist and activist (died 2006)
- 20 May – Peter Copley, actor (died 2008)
- 5 June – Lancelot Ware, barrister and biochemist (died 2000)
- 7 June – Dominic Bruce, RAF officer (died 2000)
- 8 June
  - Julian Ridsdale, politician (died 2004)
  - O. W. Wolters, academic, historian and author (died 2000)
- 17 June – Elisabeth Lambert Ortiz, food writer (died 2003)
- 22 June – Duncan Clark, hammer thrower (died 2003)
- 23 June – Robin Montgomerie-Charrington, racing driver (died 2007)
- 24 June – Fred Hoyle, astronomer (died 2001)
- 26 June – David Caminer, computer programmer (died 2008)
- 1 July
  - Bert Axell, naturalist (died 2001)
  - Philip Lever, 3rd Viscount Leverhulme, peer (died 2000)
- 2 July
  - Peggy Hubicki, composer and teacher (d. 2006)
  - Valerian Wellesley, 8th Duke of Wellington (d. 2014)
- 11 July – Leonard Goodwin, pharmacologist (d. 2008)
- 15 July
  - David Tree, actor (died 2009)
  - Charlie Wipfler, professional footballer (died 1983)
- 18 July – Louis Le Bailly, vice-admiral (died 2010)
- 21 July – Miles Fitzalan-Howard, 17th Duke of Norfolk, army general (died 2002)
- 28 July – Peter Young, military historian (died 1988)
- 9 August – Michael Young, sociologist (died 2002)
- 10 August – Ralph Thomas, film director (died 2001)
- 14 August
  - Victor Mishcon, lawyer and politician (died 2006)
  - Derek Prince, Biblical scholar (died 2003)
- 22 August – Hugh Paddick, actor (died 2000)
- 28 August – Max Robertson, sports commentator (died 2009)
- 29 August
  - Jack Agazarian, English World War II spy (died 1945)
  - Denys Hay, historian (died 1994)
- 30 August
  - Lillian May Davies, later Princess Lilian, Duchess of Halland, Welsh fashion model and Swedish princess (died 2013)
  - Jack Simmons, historian (died 2000)
- 31 August – Napier Crookenden, army general (died 2002)
- 4 September – Roland Mathias, Welsh poet (died 2007)
- 8 September – Frank Pullen, businessman and racehorse owner (died 1992)
- 19 September – Duffy Ayers, portrait painter (died 2017)
- 22 September – Arthur Lowe, actor (died 1982)
- 23 September
  - George Alfred Barnard, statistician (died 2002)
  - John Rowlands, air marshal (died 2006)
- 25 September – Betty Box, film producer (died 1999)
- 8 October – Winifred Pennington, limnologist (died 2007)
- 11 October – T. Llew Jones, Welsh-language writer (died 2009)
- 13 October
  - Joan Hunter Dunn, muse of poet John Betjeman (died 2008)
  - Terry Frost, artist (died 2003)
  - Frederick Rosier, air chief marshal (died 1998)
  - Barbara Wright, translator (died 2009)
- 27 October – Robert Alexander Rankin, mathematician (died 2001)
- 3 November – Gilbert Monckton, 2nd Viscount Monckton of Brenchley, major-general (died 2006)
- 4 November – Marguerite Patten, home economist (died 2015)
- 16 November – Maurice Oldfield, intelligence chief (died 1981)
- 19 November – Lena Jeger, politician (died 2007)
- 24 November – Helen Cherry, actress (died 2001)
- 12 December – Felicity Hill, Royal Air Force officer (died 2019)
- 14 December – Anthony Kershaw, politician (died 2008)
- 18 December – Peter Laslett, historian (died 2001)
- 22 December – Peter Elstob, soldier (died 2002)
- 28 December – Jack Milroy, comedian and actor (died 2001)

== Deaths ==
- 3 January – James Elroy Flecker, poet, novelist and dramatist (born 1884; died of tuberculosis)
- 13 January – Mary Slessor, Christian missionary (born 1848)
- 14 January – Richard Meux Benson, founder of an Anglican religious order (born 1824)
- 4 February – Mary Elizabeth Braddon, popular novelist (born 1835)
- 4 March – William Willett, promoter of daylight saving time (born 1856)
- 15 March – George Llewelyn Davies, one of the 'Lost Boys' who inspired Peter Pan (born 1893; killed in action)
- 31 March – Wyndham Halswelle, runner (born 1882; killed in action)
- 4 April – Andrew Stoddart, sportsman (born 1863)
- 23 April – Rupert Brooke, poet (born 1887; died on active service)
- 27 April – William Barnard Rhodes-Moorhouse, airman (born 1887; killed in action; awarded posthumous Victoria Cross)
- 26 May – Julian Grenfell, war poet (born 1888; killed in action)
- 26 July – Sir James Murray, Scottish-born lexicographer (born 1837)
- 10 August – Henry Moseley, physicist (born 1887; killed in action)
- 25 September – Rex Hargreaves, a son of Alice Liddell (born 1883; killed in action)
- 26 September – Keir Hardie, Scottish socialist, first chairman of the Parliamentary Labour Party and pacifist (born 1856)
- 12 October – Edith Cavell, nurse (born 1865; executed for treason)
- 13 October – Charles Sorley, Scottish-born poet (born 1895; killed in action)
- 23 October – W. G. Grace, cricketer (born 1848)
- 5 November – Thomas Trollope, 3rd Baron Kesteven, soldier (born 1891, died of wounds)
- 11 November – Robert Barker, footballer (born 1847)
- 23 December – Roland Leighton, war poet (born 1895; died of wounds)
- In fiction – Sir Harry Flashman, soldier, bully and antihero (born 1822)

== See also ==
- List of British films before 1920
