= Axell =

Axell is a surname. Notable people with the surname include:

- Axell Hodges (born 1996), motocross and X Games competitor
- Bert Axell (1915–2001), British naturalist and conservationist
- Evelyne Axell (1935–1972), Belgian painter
- Suzanne Axell (born 1955), Swedish journalist and television presenter
