= Kim Bradley =

Kim Bradley may refer to:

- Kim Bradley (surfer) (1955–2009), Australian surfer
- Kim Bradley (cricketer) (born 1967), Australian former cricket player
