= Giansanti =

Giansanti is a surname. Notable people with the surname include:

- Gianni Giansanti (1956–2009), Italian photographer
- Mirko Giansanti (1976–2023), Italian motorcycle road racer
