= David Bianco =

David Bianco is the name of:

- David Bianco (educator) (1939–2016), American educator
- David Bianco (producer) (1954–2018), American music producer
