= Bob Scott (ornithologist) =

British ornithologist and conservationist

- Born: 11 May 1938; Carshalton, Surrey, England
- Died: 26 March 2009 (aged 70); Huntingdon, Cambridgeshire, England
- Occupations: Ornithologist and RSPB staff member
- Spouse: Ann

Robert Ernest Scott (11 May 1938 – 26 March 2009) was a British ornithologist and Royal Society for the Protection of Birds (RSPB) staff member. He worked for the RSPB for close to 40 years, beginning as a warden and eventually becoming head of Reserves Management. He is credited with discovering numerous new British birds, four before his 32nd birthday. He retired from the RSPB in 1997 but continued to work in conservation in Britain and other countries, notably in Bulgaria where he had previously been awarded a medal from the government. He died of cancer in 2009.

== Early life and Dungeness ==
As a child, Scott was evacuated to a farm in Wiltshire, returning after the war to Carshalton. He attended Sutton County Grammar School, regularly visiting a sewage works in Beddington, a local birdwatching spot. Later, he would regularly cycle to Dungeness, Kent, a round trip of over 100 miles, to watch birds, falling under the influence of Bert Axell who founded Dungeness RSPB reserve in 1952. As he grew older he began to go further afield and in 1958 he was amongst the first people to spot the American northern waterthrush in St Agnes, on the Isles of Scilly.

== The RSPB ==
In 1960, following Axell's move to a different post, Scott was employed as Warden for both the bird observatory and the reserve at Dungeness. He began to gain greater notability through his work in Dungeness and also through finding three more new visiting birds to Britain. In 1960 he found the dark-eyed junco, a bird normally found in North America, and in 1968 he spotted the short-toed treecreeper, normally found in continental Europe. Both these finds were at the Dungeness reserve. He also, unknowingly, spotted the first Hume's leaf warbler in 1966, at Beachy Head, Kent. At the time it was believed to be a variant of the yellow-browed warbler, but was reclassified in 2002 and the recording of it by Scott was declared the first official one.

In 1975, Scott moved to a new position as Warden at Northward Hill RSPB reserve. He worked there for four years and during that time began running training courses for bird ringers in Rwanda, Burundi and Ghana.

In 1979, Scott again moved, this time to the RSPB headquarters in Sandy, Bedfordshire. Initially he was employed as Reserves Manager (England), moving to Senior Reserves Manager and then into Head of Reserves Management, which he held until his retirement in 1997.

== Work abroad ==
Scott often visited foreign countries, regularly leading these trips. He was able to add numerous first sightings during these trips while contributing to the education of the local people in basic conservation. It was during one of these trips that he was awarded a medal by the Bulgarian government, for the work he had done.

== British Birds journal ==
In 2000, Scott joined with other leading ornithologists to save the ailing British Birds journal. He had been a contributor to the journal for numerous years, having his first piece published in the 1950s. He was a director and member of the charitable trust that owned the journal until his death.

== Bibliography ==
- The Birdwatchers Key (Frederick Warne, 1976) ISBN 0-7232-1829-3
- The Birdwatchers Calendar (Ebury Press, 1982) ISBN 0-85223-249-7
- The Atlas of British Bird Life (Hamlyn, 1987) ISBN 0-600-33319-1

=== As contributor ===
- Bird Observatories in Britain and Ireland (edited by Roger Durman) (Poyser, 1976) ISBN 0-85661-013-5
- RSPB Nature Reserves (edited by Nicholas Hammond) (1983)
- Go Birding (by Tony Soper) (BBC Books, 1988) ISBN 0-563-20650-0
