= Charlie Wipfler =

English footballer

Personal information
- Full name: Charles John Wipfler
- Date of birth: 15 July 1915
- Place of birth: Trowbridge, England
- Date of death: 1 June 1983 (aged 67)
- Place of death: Petts Wood, England
- Position: Outside forward

Senior career*
Years	Team	Apps	(Gls)
1934–?	Bristol Rovers	18	(5)
?–1937	Heart of Midlothian		
1937–?	Watford	22	(7)
- Canterbury City
1946–?	Watford	13	(1)
- * Club domestic league appearances and goals

Charles John Wipfler (15 July 1915 – 1 June 1983) was an English professional footballer who played for Heart of Midlothian, Watford and Gravesend & Northfleet.
