= Harry Zachariah =

Australian cricketer

Personal information
- Born: 4 June 1911; Stirling, South Australia, Australia
- Died: 15 March 2009 (aged 97); Melbourne, Australia

Domestic team information
- Years: Team
- 1935-1936: Victoria
- Source: Cricinfo, 22 November 2015

Harry Zachariah (4 June 1911 – 15 March 2009) was an Australian cricketer. He played two first-class cricket matches for Victoria between 1935 and 1936.

== See also ==
- List of Victoria first-class cricketers
