= Road Scholar =

American non-profit organization

- Formerly: Elderhostel
- Type: Corporate
- Industry: Educational travel
- Founded: 1975; 51 years ago
- Headquarters: Boston, Massachusetts, United States
- Revenue: 157,086,376 United States dollar (2022)
- Total assets: 208,363,648 United States dollar (2022)
- Number of employees: 270
- Website: roadscholar.org

Road Scholar (formerly Elderhostel) is an American not-for-profit organization that provides educational travel programs primarily geared toward older adults. The organization is headquartered in Boston, Massachusetts. From its founding in 1975 until 2010, Road Scholar was known as Elderhostel. Road Scholar offers study tours throughout the United States and Canada and in approximately 150 other countries.

== History ==
Elderhostel was founded in 1975 by friends Marty Knowlton, social activist and self-described hippie, and David Bianco, director of residential life at the University of New Hampshire. Knowlton rejected the ageist belief that one's mind must fail as one ages. After four years of backpacking through Europe and staying in hostels, Knowlton, then in his 50s, returned to the United States to direct the youth hostel program at the University of New Hampshire. There, he and Bianco, the university administrator, decided that society needed "elder hostels" in addition to youth hostels.

The program started in the summer of 1975, offering older adults noncredit classes and dormitory housing on campuses in New England—a sort of "summer school for retired people." Elderhostel was officially established as a not-for-profit organization in 1977. Its program offerings expanded through the United States and Canada, and eventually internationally. By the 1990s, more than 200,000 people were learning with Elderhostel each year.

In 2010, Elderhostel changed its name to Road Scholar in order to appeal to the next wave of older travelers: Baby Boomers. CEO James Moses explained the name change to the San Francisco Chronicle: "Hostel" no longer accurately described the lodging offered on the programs and "Baby Boomers, even when they're in their 60s, don't like to think of themselves as 'elders,'" he said. For a few months during 2010, the company was called Exploritas before changing its name to Road Scholar because they were sued for infringing on the name.

== See also ==
- Topdeck
- Belmond Ltd.
