= David Bianco (educator) =

- Born: June 25, 1939
- Died: January 11, 2016 (aged 76)
- Occupation(s): dean of Brandeis University and Boston University, director of residential life at the University of New Hampshire
- Known for: co-founder of Elderhostel

David Bianco (July 25, 1939 – January 11, 2016) was the co-founder of Elderhostel, a not-for-profit organization established in the United States in 1975, which offers adults lifelong learning opportunities across North America and throughout the world.

A former dean of Brandeis University and Boston University and director of residential life at the University of New Hampshire, Bianco co-founded Elderhostel, Inc. in 1975 with Martin Knowlton.

== Elderhostel ==
In 1975, Bianco was responsible for the management of the dormitory and dining programs at the University of New Hampshire. Bianco hired Knowlton to run the youth hostel on campus. As Knowlton was a self-described aging hippie with a white beard, the idea was born to have instead of a "Youth Hostel", an "Elder Hostel".

The two devised a program in which people over age 60 could take summer courses while staying on campus in student dormitories. The program started in 1975 with 220 students ages 60 and up on five college campuses in New Hampshire, with the support of Eugene S. Mills, president of the University of New Hampshire and a grant of $7,500 from the Spaulding Potter Charitable Trust. Within five years it had grown to 20,000 students. The program was expanded internationally, to Mexico, Great Britain and Scandinavia in 1981. By 2010 more than 4 million adults had taken Elderhostel programs, and in 2010 the organization changed the name of its programs to Road Scholar.

== After Elderhostel ==
After leaving Elderhostel, Bianco joined Knowlton to manage a new organization Knowlton had created, first called Gatekeepers to the Future. It was restructured and renamed the Center for the Study of the Future in the early 1990s. Bianco resided in Ventura, California.
