= Wayne Lewellen =

American film producer

Allen Wayne Lewellen (February 16, 1944 – March 27, 2009) was an American film distribution executive and producer for Paramount Pictures.

A native Texan, Lewellen began his career in 1965, aged 21, at Warner Bros.' Dallas branch. He began heading the distribution unit for the studio's motion picture group in 1986 and added foreign distribution to his duties in 1993.

During his tenure, he was responsible for distributing such films as Forrest Gump, Titanic, Top Gun, Fatal Attraction, Beverly Hills Cop and the Star Trek film series. Lewellen left the studio at the end of 2005, after reportedly having been forced out by film executive Brad Grey.

== Death ==
Lewellen died on March 27, 2009, aged 65, following a short battle with cancer at his home in Westlake Village, California. He was survived by his wife, Rosemary Lewellen; three sons, six grandchildren, one brother (Jesse Lewellyn) and two sisters (Addie Ruth Lewellen-Poteet, Betty Lewellen-Hill).
