= Russell Spears =

Russell Spears (March 8, 1917 – March 9, 2009) was an American stonemason and Narragansett tribal elder. Spears served on the tribal council. Spears continued the stonemasonry which has been practiced by the Narragansett since the 17th century. He was well known for his stonemasonry throughout New England, which included handcrafted fireplaces, stone walls and patios.

== Personal life ==
Spears was born in Providence, Rhode Island. His hobbies included playing the guitar, hunting deer, playing the piano and singing ballads. He often wore the Native American jewelry he made and later in his life wore cowboy hats.

== Career ==
Spears initially worked at the Kenyon Piece Dye Works, but disliked working inside and told the owner he would look elsewhere for work. Most of his uncles and other relatives worked as stonemasons. He quickly learned the craft from his relatives.

Spears constructed stone structures throughout Connecticut, Rhode Island, and Massachusetts' Cape Cod throughout his long career, which spanned decades. Spears often added artistic elements to his creations, including etched images and other artistic details. His work was featured on the documentary Stories in Stone, which aired on PBS. He also taught his sons to carve and shape rocks and stones, thus continuing the family and Narragansett traditions.

== Later life ==
Spears' house burned down in 2008, forcing him to move into his son's home. A fundraising drive was underway when Spears fell ill.

Russell Spears died on March 9, 2009, at South County Hospital in Wakefield, Rhode Island, at the age of 92. His wife, Grace Babcock (Brown) Spears (1917 - June 22, 1998), Narragansett Indian Tribal member and youngest sister to 2-time Boston Marathon winner (1936, 1939) and 1936 U.S. Olympian Ellison "Tarzan" Brown, had predeceased him.
