= Anel Omar Rodríguez =

Panamanian politician

Anel Omar Rodríguez (died March 10, 2009) was a Panamanian politician, who served as Panama's Minister of Culture and deputy Minister of Labor during his career. Rodriguez was considered a prominent member of Panama's governing Democratic Revolutionary Party at the time of his death in 2009.

Rodriguez previously served as the deputy Minister of Labor, before being appointed as Culture Minister under Panamanian President Martin Torrijos. He had also served as Panama's ambassador to Cuba. Rodriguez also served as the head of Panama's National Culture Institute until his death.

Rodriguez was killed on March 10, 2009, when he was accidentally caught in the crossfire of a shootout between robbers and security guards outside the National Lottery for Charity in Panama City. He was believed to be running an errand near the lottery building when he was caught in the shootout and killed, along with a Brinks security guard. Rodriguez had just left his car in front of the lottery building when the shooting began.

President Martin Torrijos called Rodriguez, "An exemplary Panamanian, a great patriot and an excellent father." Opposition presidential candidate Balbina Herrera blamed criminals from outside the country for the shootout, saying that Mexican and Colombian nationals should have to obtain visas to enter Panama.

Anel Omar Rodríguez was 47 years old at the time of his murder. He was survived by his wife and four children.
