= Ann Marie Rogers =

British breast cancer campaigner (1952 – 2009)

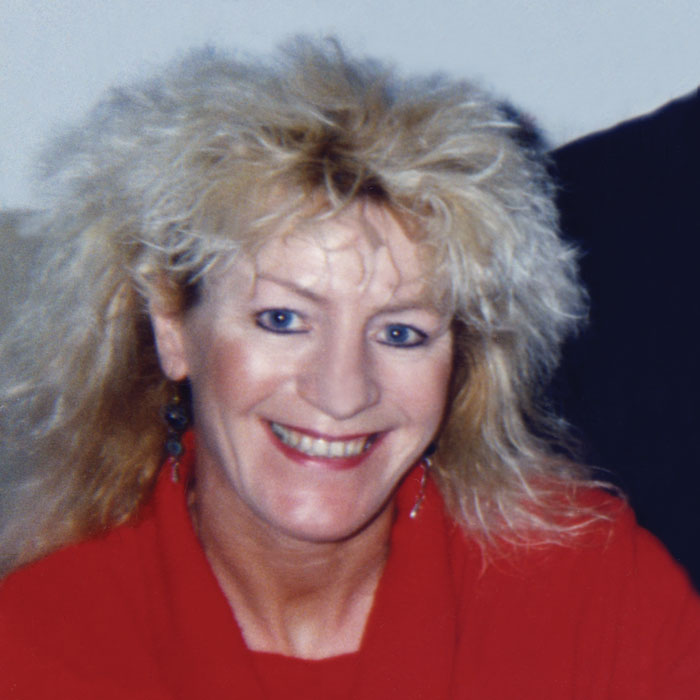
Ann Marie Rogers

Ann Marie Rogers (1952 – 2 March 2009) was a British campaigner who fought a successful landmark court battle to receive the breast cancer drug Herceptin on the National Health Service (NHS). Herceptin (Trastuzumab) is a treatment for women with breast cancer whose tumors have too much HER2 protein. This type of cancer is known as "HER2-positive", "HER2+", or "HER2 overexpressing". HER2+ tumors tend to grow and spread more quickly than tumors that are not HER2+.

== Battle with NHS ==
Rogers was born in Swindon, Wiltshire, where she worked as a waitress. Following her diagnosis with the disease, and chemotherapy and radiotherapy treatments, Swindon Primary Care Trust refused to pay for the Herceptin, which might extend her life. Rogers borrowed £5,000 to pay for the drug herself.

Rogers decided to go further and pursued legal action. She originally lost her High Court case, but carried the fight to the Court of Appeal in April 2006, which overturned the original ruling. The medication, Herceptin, was fast-tracked for use on the NHS as a result, winning approval in 2006.

== Death ==
Ann Marie Rogers died 2 March 2009, aged 57; survived by her three children.

== See also ==
- HER2/neu

== Tributes ==
- The Times tribute
- The Telegraph tribute
- Swindon Web tribute
