= Bazgul Badakhshi =

Afghan folklore singer (1902–2009)

Bazgul Badakhshi بازگل بدخشی
- Born: 1902; Takab Kambo Village, Kishim, Badakhshan, Afghanistan
- Died: March 29, 2009 (aged 106–107) Chenarganjishkan Village, Badakhshan, Afghanistan
- Genre: Folklore
- Occupations: Musician; Singer
- Instrument: Ghijak
- Years active: 1936–2009

Bazgul Badakhshi (Persian: بازگل بدخشی; c. 1902 – 29 March 2009) was an Afghan folk singer, musician, and folklorist. He is well known for the song Ay Shokh which was sung in Radio Afghanistan.

== Life and career ==
Bazgul Badakhshi was born in 1902 in Takab Kambo Village, Kishim, Badakhshan, Afghanistan. He started his singing career when he was 30 years old, which he performed for Governor of Badakhshan Province. Badakhshi spent his military service in 1957 at the Royal Palace of Afghanistan. He began to cooperate with Professor Yaqoob Qasemi and Khayal and sang in Radio Afghanistan.

== Death ==
Badakhshi died on March 29, 2009 at the age of 107. He was buried at Chenarganjishkan Village, Badakhshan, Afghanistan.
