= Michael Quinn (academic) =

American psychologist

Thomas Michael Quinn, F.S.C. (August 9, 1922 – March 15, 2009) was an American Roman Catholic Lasallian Brothers and psychology professor. Quinn served as the 25th President of Saint Mary's College of California, which was also his alma mater, from 1962 until 1969. Quinn was a 1947 graduate of the college.

Quinn died on March 15, 2009, at the age of 86. He was buried at Mont La Salle in Napa, California.
