= Joseph Martin (speaker) =

American priest

The Reverend Joseph C. Martin S.S.
- Born: October 12, 1924; Baltimore, Maryland United States
- Died: March 9, 2009 (aged 84); Havre de Grace, Maryland, United States
- Occupation: Catholic priest
- Known for: Lecturer/educator on alcoholism

Joseph Charles Martin, SS (October 12, 1924 – March 9, 2009) was an American Catholic priest, recovered alcoholic and renowned speaker and educator on the issues of alcoholism and drug addiction. He was a member of the Sulpicians.

== Background ==
Martin attended St. Thomas Aquinas Elementary School from 1930 to 1938, then completed four years of secondary education at Loyola High School. He then went on to Loyola College, graduating in 1944.

Martin entered St. Mary's Seminary in Baltimore, Maryland in 1944, where he studied philosophy and theology. On May 22, 1948, at the age of 24, Joseph C. Martin was ordained as a priest for the Archdiocese of Baltimore.

Martin's first assignment was at St. Joseph's College, a preparatory seminary serving the Archdiocese of San Francisco. In 1951, he completed the rigorous training required to become a Sulpician. His next assignment was at the Sulpician Seminary St. Charles College in Catonsville, Maryland.

During this time, Martin began drinking excessively and his behaviour became increasingly erratic. Despite repeated warnings, he was unable to get his drinking under control. Finally, the Archdiocese was forced to take action and sent Martin for intervention and treatment.

== Treatment at Guest House ==
On June 15, 1958, Martin entered Guest House in Lake Orion, Michigan, a treatment facility for the clergy that was founded and operated by Austin Ripley, a syndicated columnist.

While drinking Austin Ripley came across a copy of the Saturday Evening Post, and he discovered an article featuring Alcoholics Anonymous. The article described how this young organization helped alcoholics achieve and maintain sobriety. It also talked about their “Big Book” which had been in print for some time. As a result of this article, Austin Ripley began his journey of recovery through Alcoholics Anonymous, devoting a good deal of the ensuing year in conversations with Bill W. and Dr. Bob, the founders of AA.

Martin met Austin Ripley on his first day at Guest House. He was also introduced to Dr. Walter Green, another recovering alcoholic. Dr. Green was the first to talk to Martin about the manner in which drugs and alcohol cause the emotions to over-rule intellect.

Martin deeply admired Austin Ripley, and was so impressed with Dr. Green's lectures that he saved his notes from his conversations with them for over 14 years. They became the basis of his famous “Chalk Talks,” a series of lectures that have been heard by hundreds of thousands of people around the world. Martin always credited both men for teaching him everything he knew about alcoholism.

== Career after treatment ==
After Martin achieved sobriety and learned all he could from Austin Ripley and Dr. Green, he embarked on a campaign of spreading his message of experience and hope. He attended and completed the Rutgers Summer School of Alcohol Studies during the summer of 1971. He then worked as a lecturer and educator in the Division of Alcoholism Control for the State of Maryland and as a freelance consultant on alcoholism, a position he held from the fall of 1973 until his death. In 1972, Martin first put his lecture Chalk Talk on Alcohol on film for the US Navy. He and Mrs. Mae Abraham started Kelly Productions, Inc. to produce and distribute this and other lectures on various media. "Chalk Talk" would eventually become his signature lecture and would be widely utilized in most branches of the US Federal Government (especially the armed services), business and industry presentations, hospitals, rehabilitation centers, and many state alcohol programs. He has made many other films, tapes, CDs and DVDs on various aspects of the disease of addiction and recovery from it. He is the author of several publications including “No Laughing Matter,” published by Harper & Row in 1982. In 1983 Martin and Mrs. Mae Abraham founded Father Martin’s Ashley, a non-profit center dedicated to the treatment of the chemically addicted, located in Havre de Grace, Maryland. Martin also continued to work within the church and participated in the International Conference on Drugs and Alcohol sponsored by the Vatican in 1991.

Martin died of heart failure at his home in Havre de Grace, Maryland, on March 9, 2009. His burial Mass took place at the Baltimore Basilica on Friday, March 13, 2009, at 10:00am.

== Selected works ==
- Martin, Joseph C. (1982). No Laughing Matter : Chalk Talks on Alcohol (1st ed.). San Francisco : Harper & Row. ISBN 978-0-06-065440-5.
- Martin, Joseph C. (1989). Chalk Talks on Alcohol (2nd ed.). San Francisco : Harper & Row. ISBN 978-0-06-250593-4.
- Joseph C Martin (1976). Chalk Talk on Alcohol (DVD). Bel Air, MD: Kelly Productions Inc.
- Joseph C Martin. Am I My Brother's Keeper (DVD). Bel Air, MD: Kelly Productions Inc.
- Joseph C Martin. Enabling & Detachment (DVD). Bel Air, MD: Kelly Productions Inc.
- Joseph C Martin. Feelings (DVD). Bel Air, MD: Kelly Productions Inc.
- Joseph C Martin. Getting Back to Basics (DVD). Bel Air, MD: Kelly Productions Inc.
- Joseph C Martin. Going Home (DVD). Bel Air, MD: Kelly Productions Inc.
- Joseph C Martin. Gratitude (DVD). Bel Air, MD: Kelly Productions Inc.
- Joseph C Martin. Humor in Recovery (DVD). Bel Air, MD: Kelly Productions Inc.
- Joseph C Martin. One Day at a Time (DVD). Bel Air, MD: Kelly Productions Inc.
- Joseph C Martin. Prayer, The Path to God's Will (DVD). Bel Air, MD: Kelly Productions Inc.
- Joseph C Martin. Promises of AA (DVD). Bel Air, MD: Kelly Productions Inc.
- Joseph C Martin. Recovery and Forgiveness (DVD). Bel Air, MD: Kelly Productions Inc.
- Joseph C Martin. Recovery and the Family (DVD). Bel Air, MD: Kelly Productions Inc.
- Joseph C Martin. Recovery Talks (DVD). Bel Air, MD: Kelly Productions Inc.
- Joseph C Martin. Spiritual Aspects of Alcoholism (DVD). Bel Air, MD: Kelly Productions Inc.
- Joseph C Martin. Steps 1 thru 3 of AA (DVD). Bel Air, MD: Kelly Productions Inc.
- Joseph C Martin. Steps 4 & 5 of AA (DVD). Bel Air, MD: Kelly Productions Inc.
- Joseph C Martin. Symptoms of Alcoholism (DVD). Bel Air, MD: Kelly Productions Inc.
- Joseph C Martin. Symptoms of Sobriety (DVD). Bel Air, MD: Kelly Productions Inc.
- Joseph C Martin. Values (DVD). Bel Air, MD: Kelly Productions Inc.

== See also ==
- Disease theory of alcoholism
- E. Morton Jellinek
