= Earl Paulk =

American televangelist

- Earl Pearly Paulk, Jr.
- Born: May 30, 1927; Appling County, Georgia
- Died: March 29, 2009 (aged 81); Atlanta, Georgia
- Education: Furman University, Candler School of Theology
- Occupation: preacher
- Known for: Founder of the Cathedral of Chapel Hill
- Parent(s): Earl Pearly Paulk, Sr. Addie Mae Tomberlin Paulk

Earl Pearly Paulk, Jr. (May 30, 1927 – March 29, 2009) was an American televangelist and the founder of the Cathedral at Chapel Hill, a charismatic/Pentecostal megachurch in Decatur, Georgia, a suburb of Atlanta. Noted as "one of the country’s first great independent megachurches", Paulk's church gained an international reputation for combining liturgical arts, such as dance and drama, with social ministry. Paulk was also known for his lifelong crusade against racism.

Paulk's reputation was severely tarnished in his later years by allegations of sexual misconduct, including several illicit relationships and accusations that he had molested children.

== Early life and training ==
Earl Paulk was born on May 30, 1927, in Appling County, Georgia, near Savannah, to Earl Pearly Paulk, Sr. and Addie Mae Tomberlin Paulk. His father was a minister in the Church of God (Cleveland, Tennessee), eventually rising to assistant general overseer of the denomination. At 17, Paulk said he received a call from God to enter ministry.

Paulk graduated from Furman University in Greenville, South Carolina in the 1940s, and earned his divinity degree from Emory University's Candler School of Theology, becoming the first Pentecostal to attend the historically Methodist seminary. While at Candler, he married Norma Davis, a girl who had attended his father's church.

== Civil rights work ==
While attending Furman, Paulk served as an associate pastor at his father's church in Greenville. While at Candler, he was called to his first pulpit, a Church of God in Buford, Georgia, north of Atlanta. It was during this time that he began preaching against racism. Years later, Paulk said that he was influenced by seeing his uncle shoot a black friend in the back for cutting corners while plowing cotton. His stance was not typical for his time; it had long been common for white Southern preachers to use the Bible to justify support for racial discrimination.

In 1952, Paulk was named pastor of Atlanta's Hemphill Avenue Church of God (now Mount Paran Church of God) just as the civil rights movement was getting underway. He was one of the few white pastors who marched with Martin Luther King Jr. Not long after taking over at Hemphill, Paulk became a member of "Concerned Clergy," an interracial group of Atlanta pastors who opposed racial segregation. The group was led by King's father, Martin Luther King Sr., and met in the basement of the elder King's church, Ebenezer Baptist Church. During this time, Paulk served on a committee that observed Georgia's then-segregated schools, and determined that "separate but equal" was a fiction.

Paulk said that he signed The Atlanta Ministers' Manifesto, a statement prepared in the fall of 1957 by a group of eighty clergymen in Georgia, relating specifically to racial violence in Little Rock, Arkansas, and in general to issues of racial integration from the point of view of Christian social responsibility., but examination of that document does not include Paulk's signature. His name does, however, appear in the second Ministers' Manifesto of 1958.

Paulk resigned from Hemphill in 1960. Officially, it was due to differences of opinion with Church of God leaders regarding his stance on racial integration, as well as the fact he allowed women in his church to wear jewelry — something that the Church of God, like many Pentecostal denominations at the time, admonished against. However, it later emerged that Paulk had had an extramarital affair with a woman at Hemphill.

== Church & Ministry ==
In 1960, Paulk founded the Gospel Harvesters Evangelistic Association with his wife, his brother Don (also a former Church of God pastor), and his sister-in-law Clariece. During its early years, the church held services at St. John's Lutheran Church in the Little Five Points section of Atlanta. It later moved to its own building in nearby Inman Park.

From the first day, Paulk was committed to opening the doors of his church to all people, regardless of racial or economic background. Not surprisingly, given his opposition to segregation, he was one of the first white pastors to open the doors of his church to blacks. This stance wasn't popular even with some members of his own church; when the first blacks set foot in the church in the early 1960s, several whites walked out in protest. In response, one of the whites who remained, Ida Williams, gave a fifteen-minute sermon in which she said, "It is not the will of God that we should have prejudice." Until the end of the church's heyday, the church had a fairly large black membership for a church led by a white pastor. In later years, Paulk became one of the few mainstream Pentecostal/charismatic leaders to welcome openly gay and lesbian members.

Paulk remained active in the civil rights movement during this time. For instance, at a meeting of Concerned Clergy, he was one of the pastors who blessed the first civil rights march in Selma, Alabama. Later, he and his brother picketed a produce market which sold food to blacks at inflated prices. The resulting public outcry caused the store's closure.

In 1972, Paulk's church moved to the southern part of DeKalb County and became known as Chapel Hill Harvester Church. While there, the church experienced massive growth, enlarging the building several times, having services in a tent, then moving its services into a building known as the "K-Center." Between 1985 and 1988, the church broke ground on a large, Gothic-style building off Interstate 285 in Decatur. Dedicated in 1991, this building was known as the "Cathedral of the Holy Spirit," and eventually the church changed its name to "the Cathedral at Chapel Hill." Paulk's church population numbers exploded during the 1990s; at its height it had 12,000 members.

The Cathedral at Chapel Hill was famed for combining visual arts (particularly with the dance team) with a liturgical style. Under Paulk's sister-in-law Clariece, who headed the church's arts ministry for many years, it became known for its music ministry as well. Paulk, who had previous television and radio ministry experience, later expanded his media ministry and for many years his show aired on the Trinity Broadcasting Network (TBN). He also was a semi-regular guest on TBN's Praise the Lord.

In 1982, Paulk was ordained as a bishop in the International Communion of Charismatic Churches. His public housing ministry was named one of a "thousand points of light" by President George H. W. Bush. Paulk gave up the senior pastor's title to his brother Don, but as bishop was acknowledged as the real power.

After Paulk's death in March 2009, with the Cathedral property facing foreclosure, in August the campus was sold to another local growing church for $17.6 million. The church, now led by D. E. Paulk, changed its name to Spirit and Truth Assembly and moved to another location in Decatur.

== Sex scandals ==
=== Allegations by congregants ===
Paulk was involved with many sex scandals spanning several decades. In 1992, six women accused Paulk, his brother Don, and two other nephews who were ministers at the cathedral, of sexual manipulation. One of them was Tricia Weeks, who had ghostwritten Paulk's autobiography. The story received considerable national coverage. Paulk denied the allegations, claiming Weeks was either mentally unstable or under evil influences. However, he admitted to the adulterous affair which forced him out of Hemphill Church of God in 1960.

In 2001, Jessica Battle, a college student who had been part of the cathedral's dance group, sued Paulk, accusing him of molesting her between the ages of 7 and 11, and later of forcing himself on her when she was 17. The suit was settled out of court in 2003 for $400,000. In 2003, Cindy Hall claimed that Paulk had convinced her into a lengthy affair that also included her having sex with Don. Hall alleged that the affair began in 1983 when Paulk prayed for her, then kissed her. He then would say he intended to "make love" to her. At one point, Paulk supposedly would tell her that they had a "special gift of love outside holy matrimony". The relationship became a weekly occurrence. Hall left the church in 2003 after being convinced that Battle was telling the truth about being molested by Paulk. Hall also claims that at Paulk's request, she denied having sex with him, lying under oath at her deposition for the Battle case.

Mona Manning Brewer, a Sunday School teacher at the Cathedral who was featured regularly as a soloist on Paulk's television program, claimed that on September 11, 1989, Paulk felt "'impressed of the Lord' to get to know her better". She stopped by his office the next day, becoming a regular visitor. She alleged that a church official stated that there had been a "word of knowledge" claiming that she was about to enter a new relationship that would benefit her. That relationship became an affair that lasted fourteen years. She didn't break the relationship off until September 2003, and didn't tell anyone about the affair until hearing about Hall's allegations. She then told her husband, Cathedral minister Bobby Brewer, who bided his time until the refinancing of the cathedral was finished. In March 2004, Bobby Brewer angrily confronted Earl and Don Paulk at the Brewers' house, at one point hitting them both. The Brewers eventually sued Paulk and the Cathedral on August 31, 2005, claiming Paulk misused his position to manipulate Mona into a sexual relationship and claiming Paulk owed US$400,000 for a loan Bobby issued to settle the Battle case. Paulk denied the allegations from Brewers, but his attorney acknowledged a sexual relationship between him and Mona had taken place. Paulk claimed that the relationship was brief and that she was the initiator.

On Monday, March 5, 2007, at a pretrial hearing, the Brewers' lawyer wrote out a request for dismissal of the case by hand and handed it to lawyers for Paulk and the cathedral. This was just as a ruling was about to come on a motion by Paulk's lawyers to dismiss the allegations. By dropping the case before the ruling, the Brewers left open the possibility of filing another suit with the same allegations. The Brewers' lawyer said they had no choice to do so because "we were having difficulty even at this point getting witnesses to speak out against the acts of Bishop Paulk and the church."

The Brewers did, in fact, refile the suit with another judge. However, in February 2008, DeKalb County Judge Mark Anthony Scott threw the case into limbo when he ruled that Mona Brewer was "of sound mind" when she and Paulk began their relationship. Scott ordered the Brewers to reimburse Paulk for $1 million in legal expenses for filing a frivolous suit. Under Georgia law, the second suit they filed couldn't continue until the attorneys' fees were paid. However, in February 2009, the Georgia Court of Appeals reversed Scott's decision, citing numerous instances where Paulk himself stated under oath that he was Mona's "spiritual adviser, minister, pastor and reverend." Although Paulk's death removed him from the suit, Mona said she fully intended to continue her suit against the cathedral.

=== Donnie Earl Paulk ===
On October 14, 2007, Donnie Earl (D.E.) Paulk, who had become senior pastor of the cathedral a few months earlier, informed a shocked congregation that a paternity test had revealed he was Earl Paulk's son, and not his nephew as he had believed for all his life. D.E. Paulk had been raised as the son of Don Paulk, Earl Paulk's brother. However, the test confirmed that he was the product of an illicit relationship between Earl Paulk and his sister-in-law, Clariece Paulk, who was married to Don. Don Paulk later said that he has forgiven his brother, and said D.E.'s paternity "made no difference in my love for my brother or my son."

During the Brewer case, Earl Paulk had denied sleeping with anyone other than Mona Brewer. However, prosecutors and the Georgia Bureau of Investigation (GBI) suspected he was lying, and triggered an investigation that led to a court-ordered paternity test on D.E. Paulk. As a result, Earl Paulk was charged with perjury on January 14, 2008. Two days later, he pleaded guilty to the charges, for which he was sentenced to ten years probation and a $1,000 fine.

=== Allegations by daughter and granddaughter ===
Paulk's daughter, Beth Bonner, appeared on Atlanta station WAGA-TV on December 11, 2007, and apologized on behalf of her family for her father's misdeeds. She claimed to have confronted Paulk as far back as the 1980s about his immorality. According to her, Paulk had confessed and promised to reform, but reneged on his promise. She was not surprised when D.E. Paulk revealed he was her half-brother rather than her cousin. Interviewed on WAGA-TV the next day, Bonner's daughter, Penny White (née Penielle Brooke Bonner) went public with allegations, previously made only in court papers, that Paulk, her grandfather, had sexually abused her as a child. Paulk issued a statement through his lawyer denying the charge.

== Theological concerns ==
Paulk found his theology criticized concerning accusations of promoting Dominionism and Word of Faith teaching. Before opening his doors to the gay and lesbian community, he had close ties to the Christian Reconstructionist movement.

== Death ==
Paulk died early on the morning of March 29, 2009, at Atlanta Medical Center after a long battle with cancer.
