= Fawn Story =

- ABC Afterschool Special episode
- Episode no.: Season 4 Episode 2
- Directed by: Larry Elikann
- Written by: Tony Kayden
- Original air date: October 22, 1975
- Running time: 60 minutes

"Fawn Story" is a 1975 episode of the American television anthology series ABC Afterschool Special, directed by Larry Elikann. The story was based on real incidents from around the country. Med Flory, the actor who portrays the children's father in the special, said he was "touched by the story and it takes a lot of guts for people to stand up to authority, and when kids do it, you can't help being impressed".

== Plot ==
Farmer John McPhail allows his children Jenna and Toby to nurse a wounded deer. The children bring the doe to their farm where they inevitably become attached to it. They bring it into their bedrooms, and then run away from home with the animal because they are fearful the doe will be taken away by the authorities, due to the law that forbids private citizens from holding wild animals in captivity, regardless of the situation. Their fears are well-founded when the authorities show up to take the doe into custody, shooting it with a tranquilizer dart, which causes the animal to die. After the doe is killed, the children want to change the law, and organize a letter writing campaign urging changes to the law to allow private citizens to hold wild animals when it is in the best interest of the animal

== Cast ==
- Kristy McNichol - Jenna McPhail
- Poindexter Yothers - Toby McPhail
- Med Flory - John McPhail
- Karen Obediear - Louisa McPhail
- Gordon Jump - Trooper
