= The Texas Wheelers =

American television sitcom

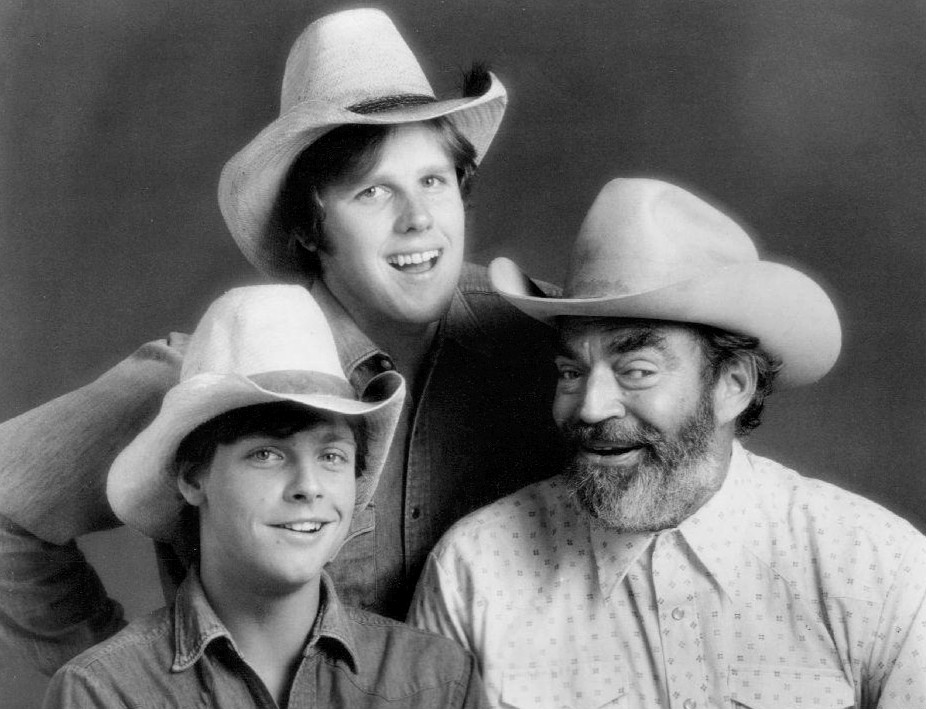
- Mark Hamill, Gary Busey and Jack Elam (1974)
- Genre: Sitcom
- Created by: Dale McRaven
- Starring: Jack Elam; Gary Busey; Mark Hamill; Karen Obediear; Tony Becker
- Theme music composer: John Prine
- Country of origin: United States
- Original language: English
- No. of seasons: 1
- No. of episodes: 13 (5 unaired)

Production
- Producer: Chris Hayward
- Running time: 22 minutes
- Production company: MTM Enterprises

Original release
- Network: ABC
- Release: September 13, 1974 – July 24, 1975

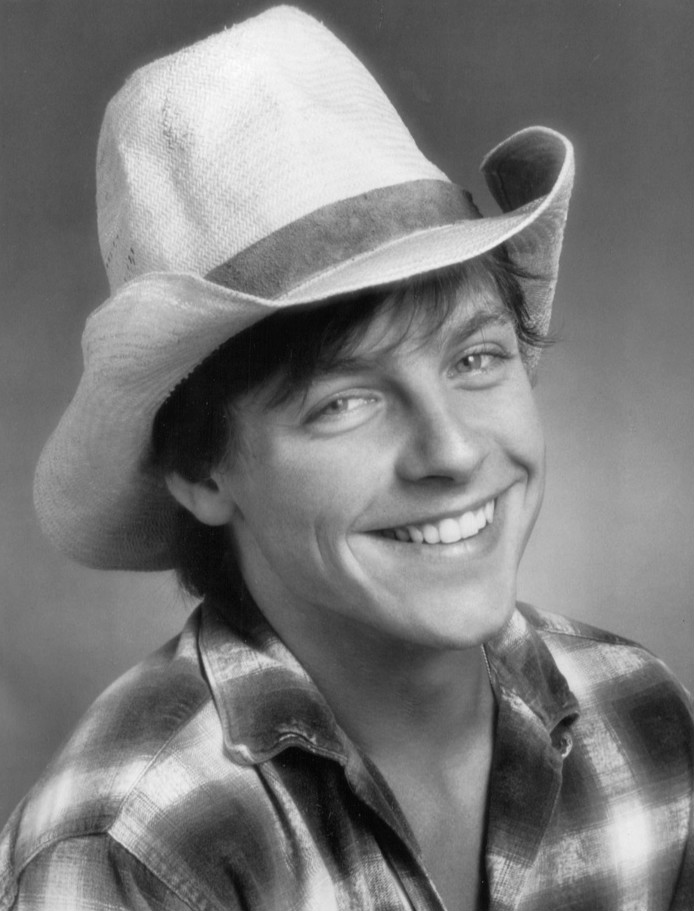
Mark Hamill in The Texas Wheelers (1975)

The Texas Wheelers is an American sitcom that aired in 1974 and 1975. The series, produced by MTM Enterprises, is about the cantankerous but lovable Zack Wheeler, a long-lost father who returns to raise his children Truckie, Doobie, Boo, and T.J. in rural Texas after their mother dies.

The show was not successful, due to being broadcast against the second half of NBC's Top 20 hit The Rockford Files, and was canceled after four episodes in the fall of 1974. An additional four episodes were aired in June and July 1975. An additional five unaired episodes were produced. The show is notable as one of MTM's few flops, and for the well-known actors in its cast, including Jack Elam as Zack, Gary Busey as Truckie, Mark Hamill as Doobie, Tony Becker as T.J., and Lisa Eilbacher as the Wheelers' friend Sally.

The theme song for the show is "Illegal Smile" by John Prine while the closing theme is "Flashback Blues."

== Cast ==
- Jack Elam as Zack Wheeler
- Gary Busey as Truckie Wheeler
- Mark Hamill as Doobie Wheeler
- Karen Obediear as Boo Wheeler
- Tony Becker as T.J. Wheeler

== Episodes ==
| No. | Title | Directed by | Written by | Original release date |
|---|---|---|---|---|
| 1 | "Wailin' Wheeler Is Dead" | Unknown | Dale McRaven | September 13, 1974 |
Truckie Wheeler, oldest brother and chief provider for his younger brothers and sisters, is faced with a school mutiny and the return of "irresponsible but lovable daddy."
| 2 | "The X-Rated Movie" | Unknown | Dale McRaven | September 20, 1974 |
Doobie watches an X-rated movie to get ready for a date, is repulsed by it and seeks advice from older brother Truckie.
| 3 | "The Accident" | Unknown | George Atkins | September 27, 1974 |
When Truckie discovers a dent in his truck, Zack denies doing it, although he used it the night before.
| 4 | "The Twister" | Unknown | Dale McRaven | October 4, 1974 |
As a tornado approaches Lamont, Truckie takes the kids to safety while Zack and Doobie are trapped together in the Wheeler basement.
| 5 | "The Bookmobile" | Unknown | Dale McRaven | July 3, 1975 |
Truckie falls hard for a pretty librarian, but he has a difficult time reconciling his feelings for her with her "wanderlust" spirit.
| 6 | "The Music Box" | Stuart Margolin | Jerry Belson | July 10, 1975 |
Zack has an antique sale when he discovers the pile of junk in his barn is considered valuable, but inadvertently sells his daughter's cherished music box.
| 7 | "The Call" | Jackie Cooper | Dale McRaven | July 17, 1975 |
When Zack gets a wandering foot and attempts to find the Lost Dutchman gold mine, his daughter Boo demands to accompany him, much to his chagrin.
| 8 | "The Rebel" | Jackie Cooper | John Regier & Gary Markowitz | July 24, 1975 |
While working several jobs in order to support the family, Truckie calls it quits and goes on strike.
