= Joseph Jasgur =

American photographer

Joseph Jasgur (March 23, 1919 – March 21, 2009) was a photographer who photographed celebrities during the golden age of Hollywood. He was noted for his photographs of Marilyn Monroe.

Monroe stepped into Jasgur's studio in 1946 with no money, but the ambition to become a model. Jasgur shot numerous photographs of her over the following weeks, including glamour shots that she used in her 20th Century Fox interview.

Jasgur sold the rights to his entire portfolio — including the Monroe photographs — to a contractor, and spent the last years of his life trying to regain control of it.
