= Michael Shannon (pediatrician) =

American paediatric toxicologist

Michael Shannon (September 9, 1953 – March 10, 2009) was an American pediatric toxicologist who specialized in the effect of toxins and poisonous substances in children. A dancer since his days in college, Shannon was known as the "dancing doctor".

== Biography ==
Shannon was born September 9, 1953. He grew up in St. Louis, Missouri. He attended that city's Washington University, where he took his first dance classes, and graduated in 1974. In 1977, Shannon was simultaneously awarded a degree in medicine from the Duke University School of Medicine, as well as a Master of Public Health from the University of North Carolina. After completing his medical degree, he was an intern at Duke University Hospital, a resident at Boston City Hospital and performed a medical toxicology fellowship at Children's Hospital Boston. He also worked in the associated poison control center.

=== Medical career ===
A professor at Harvard Medical School, he was the first African-American to be named a full professor of pediatrics at the institution when he was named to the post in November 2004. Shannon had also been the first African American to serve as a division chief at Children's Hospital Boston and had served as chief of both the emergency medicine and clinical pharmacology departments since being added to the staff of the hospital in 1983. He achieved board certification in medical toxicology, emergency medicine, pediatrics, and pediatric emergency medicine.

He was an expert on the toxicological effects of exposure of children to hazards such as alcohol and drugs, as well as lead paint, becoming a spokesman against the improper use by children of these substances. Shannon testified before Congress regarding cold medicines that could be dangerous for children. He also contributed to the toxicology literature by investigating different aspects of the toxicity of drugs such as cocaine, theophylline, and tricyclic antidepressants. He was a fellow of the American Academy of Clinical Toxicology and held the position of president of the American College of Medical Toxicology.

With the American Academy of Pediatrics, he wrote a 2003 recommendation that homes and schools within range of nuclear power plants should maintain stockpiles of iodine pills to prevent thyroid cancer in case of an accidental release of radiation. In 2005, his testimony on the effects of lead paint in children led to a verdict against three paint manufacturers which was later overturned on appeal by the Rhode Island Supreme Court.

=== Personal life ===
He was a professional dancer and was known as the "dancing doctor". He appeared in performances of Black Nativity and starred in the role of Drosselmeier from 2001 to 2008 in the production of the Urban Nutcracker, having appeared in the annual performance for eight years. He ran the Boston Marathon in 1996 and continued running four to five days per week until his death. (wife Elaine Shannon)

On March 10, 2009, Shannon was returning with his wife from a dancing vacation in Argentina. Arriving at John F. Kennedy International Airport he collapsed after leaving the plane and was taken to nearby Jamaica Hospital Medical Center. Efforts to revive him were unsuccessful. The immediate cause of death has not yet been determined. A resident of Brookline, Massachusetts, Dr. Shannon was 55 years old.

== Family ==
In addition to his wife, Shannon is survived by two children, son Evan and daughter Lila.
