= SS Bengrove =

British steamship sunk in 1915

Coordinates: 51.351°N 4.116°W

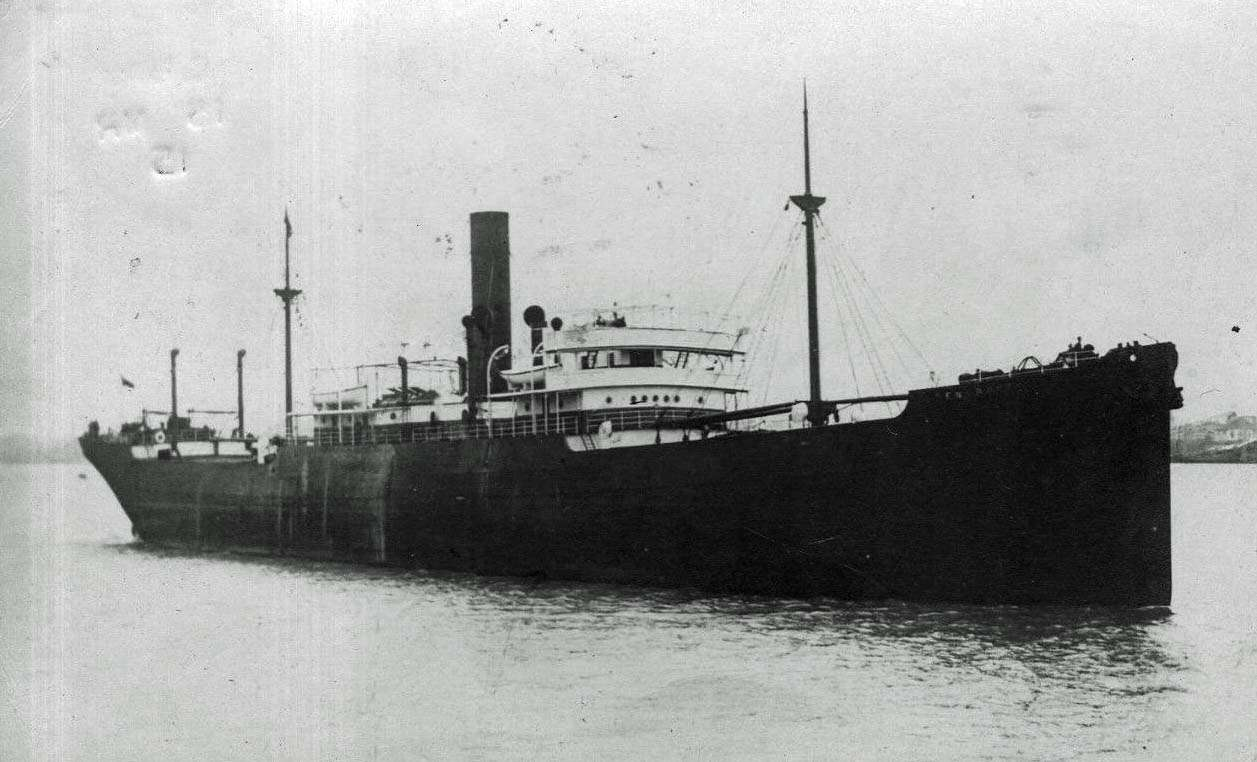
- SS Bengrove

History

United Kingdom
- Name: Bengrove
- Owner: Joseph Hoult & Co
- Port of registry: Liverpool
- Builder: Craig, Taylor & Co, Stockton
- Yard number: 139
- Launched: 24 February 1910
- Completed: April 1910
- Identification: UK official number 128037; code letters HQSC
- Fate: sunk by torpedo, 7 March 1915

General characteristics
- Type: cargo ship
- Tonnage: 3,840 GRT, 2,389 NRT
- Length: 345.0 ft (105.2 m)
- Beam: 51.2 ft (15.6 m)
- Depth: 25.4 ft (7.7 m)
- Decks: 1
- Installed power: 342 NHP
- Propulsion: 1 × triple-expansion engine; 1 × screw

SS Bengrove was a collier registered in Liverpool, England. Thousands of people on shore saw her explode and sink in the Bristol Channel on Sunday 7 March 1915.

The ship left Barry at about 4:00 am under sealed orders, carrying a cargo of 5,000 tons of coal. Later that day, in the Bristol Channel, about five miles off the coast of Ilfracombe, an explosion occurred under the ship amidships. The ship sounded her siren and the crew entered the lifeboats. The siren was heard on shore and the Ilfracombe coast guard sent lifeboats to the area. There were 21 other steamers in the area at the time of the explosion and six of them offered assistance to the foundering ship. All 33 crew were saved and taken to Ilfracombe pier. Early reports were unsure what had caused the explosion. There was speculation that the ship had struck a mine or torpedo. The cause was later determined to have been a torpedo fired by German U-boat U-20.

== Bibliography ==
- Lloyd's Register of Shipping. Vol. I.–Steamers. London: Lloyd's Register of Shipping. 1914. BEN.
- Mercantile Navy List. London. 1914. p. 58 – via Crew List Index Project.
