= Karen Obediear =

American actress

Karen Lynne Oberdiear
- Obediear in The Texas Wheelers (1974)
- Born: September 6, 1962; Westchester, California / Hayward, Alameda County, California
- Died: March 20, 2009 (aged 46); Corona, California
- Other names: Karen Oberdiear, Karen Obediear
- Years active: 1974–1979
- Known for: Television and film roles

Karen Lynne Oberdiear (often credited professionally with surname misspelled as Karen Obediear) (September 6, 1962 - March 20, 2009) was an American actress and former child star.

== Career ==
Her first role was in an episode of Sierra in 1974.

Shortly after, she appeared as Boo Wheeler in The Texas Wheelers on ABC television starting on September 13, 1974.

She also appeared in Fawn Story, an episode of the ABC Afterschool Special, and shows such as Gunsmoke, Medical Center, Rafferty, and Hello, Larry.

Her film roles were in Sybil (1976) and A Force of One (1979).

== Personal life ==
Oberdiear was born September 6, 1962, grew up in the Westchester region of Los Angeles, and attended Westchester High School. After ending her acting career she worked as a self-employed accountant.

== Death ==
Oberdiear was killed in a Piper Cherokee plane crash on March 20, 2009. She had been the only passenger. The pilot, William Morgan, also died.

== Filmography ==
Films
Year	Title	Role	Notes
1976	Sybil	The Selves	
1979	A Force of One	Alice	(final film role)

Television
Year	Title	Role	Notes
1974	Sierra	Jessica Andrews	Episode: "The Fawn"
1974-1975	The Texas Wheelers	Boo Wheeler	Was in all episodes
1975	Gunsmoke	Sallie Harker	Episode: "The Fires of Ignorance"
1975	Fawn Story	Louisa McPhail	Episode of the ABC Afterschool Special
1975	Medical Center	Gail Foster	Episode: "Gift From A Killer"
1977	Rafferty	Joanna Holander	Episode: "Rafferty"
1979	Hello, Larry	Cindy	Episode: "Peer Pressure" (final TV role)
