= Sebastian Faisst =

German handball player (1988-2009)

Sebastian Faisst (7 March 1988 in Alpirsbach (Baden-Württemberg), Germany – 3 March 2009 in Schaffhausen, Switzerland) was a German handball player, who played for the professional club TSV Dormagen since 2008, coming from the professional club HSG Konstanz and was a member and captain of the German under-21 national handball team. He died in Schaffhausen during a U-21 match against Switzerland of heart failure.
