= Dorothy Kelly (educator) =

Sister Dorothy Ann Kelly (July 26, 1929 – March 27, 2009) was an educator who as president of the College of New Rochelle turned a small Catholic women's college into a higher educational institution for students already in the work force.

The college was founded by the Ursuline Order in 1904, and was the first Catholic women's college in New York state. Kelly was president of the college from 1972 to 1997, expanding the college from one campus with fewer than a thousand students, to seven campuses with a total student body of over 6 thousand. Kelly also oversaw the launching of a nursing school and a graduate school.

Among the sites that she opened were ones in low socio-economic areas such as Bedford-Stuyvesant, Harlem, and the South Bronx. Catering to working students, the schools held classes after business hours, on nights and weekends.

Kelly was a graduate of the College of New Rochelle in 1951, joining its faculty as a history professor in 1957. She served as academic dean of the college from 1967 until her appointment as president, and as its chancellor after stepping down.
