= Martin Knowlton =

Martin Perry Knowlton (July 30, 1920 – March 12, 2009) was the American co-founder of Elderhostel, a non-profit organization established in 1975 that allows senior citizens to travel and take educational programs in the United States and around the world.

== Early life and education ==
Knowlton was born in Dallas, Texas, on July 30, 1920. In 1940, he left college to join the Free French Forces, where he served in southwest Asia as an ambulance driver and was awarded the Croix de Guerre. He joined the United States Army in 1942 and served as a medic in the Pacific Theater and was awarded the Silver Star.

Following the completion of his military service, Knowlton attended Birmingham–Southern College, where he was awarded a degree in history in 1946. He earned a master's degree in 1949 at the University of North Carolina at Chapel Hill, where he majored in political science, and later served on the school's faculty. He worked at a number of firms in Maine after graduation and returned to Yale University and Boston University for further graduate education. He was a teacher at high schools, including at Brookline High School, where he coached the school's chess team to the 1970 national championship.

== Elderhostel ==
Knowlton ran the American Youth Hostels program at the University of New Hampshire, where he envisioned a program that would combine the features of youth hostels with the adult folk school programs he had seen while backpacking through Europe. David Bianco, who supervised the dormitory and dining programs at UNH and had hired Knowlton to run the hostel based on their connections at Boston University, brainstormed about the concept. "Elder hostel" came out as a name, after Bianco saw self-described hippie Knowlton with his white beard sitting under a sign saying "youth hostel".

The two devised a program in which people above age 55 could take summer courses while staying in dormitories for a low price. Knowlton described the program's purpose as erasing "the disturbing concept that people are all used up after age 65", offering a program "aimed at stimulating the elderly out of this agism trap", solving two different problems by matching them with each other; the inefficient use of capital resources at colleges over the summer and the difficulties of those growing old in a society focused on youth. The program started in 1975 with 220 students ages 60 and up on five campuses in New Hampshire, with the support of Eugene S. Mills, president of the University of New Hampshire and a grant of $7,500 from the Spaulding Potter Charitable Trust. Within five years it had grown to 20,000 students. The program was expanded internationally, to Mexico, Great Britain and Scandinavia, in 1981. By the time of his death, Elderhostel offered 8,000 programs across the United States and in 90 countries.

With Elderhostel's growth and its incorporation as a non-profit in 1977, Knowlton left the organization citing his tendency to cut "administrative corners much too freely" and to resist "beyond all reason, needed administrative developments". Bianco described Knowlton as having "the administrative skills of a gnat".

== After Elderhostel ==
After leaving Elderhostel, Knowlton moved to California. There, he established Gatekeepers to the Future, an organization that was intended to motivate seniors to lobby for environmental change. It was restructured and renamed the Center for the Study of the Future in the early 1990s.

== Personal life ==
Knowlton died at age 88 on March 12, 2009 at a nursing home in Ventura, California.
