= Gianni Giansanti =

Italian photographer

Gianni Giansanti (1956 – March 18, 2009) was a long-time photographer of Pope John Paul II. Giansanti also covered news in Guatemala, Lebanon, Senegal, and Somalia. His reports received the World Press Award in 1978, 1988, and 1991.
