= Geoffrey Sherman =

Geoffrey Collingwood Sherman
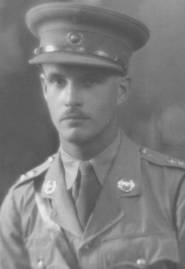
- Born: 6 April 1915
- Died: 22 March 2009 (aged 93)
- Military career
- Allegiance: United Kingdom
- Branch: Royal Marines
- Service years: 1933–50
- Rank: Lieutenant Colonel
- Units: 746 RM, Hms Berwick, Singapore
- Commands: 746 RM
- Conflicts: Second World War: Operation Fork; Norway; Taranto; Cape Spartivento
- Other work: Nigerian Special Constabulary, British Aerospace

Lieutenant Colonel Geoffrey Collingwood Sherman (6 April 1915 – 22 March 2009) was a Royal Marines officer, who as chief of staff to Lieutenant-General Boy Browning, organised the ceremony of the Japanese surrender of Singapore on 12 September 1945. He later worked in West Africa and with British Aerospace.

== Royal Marines ==
=== Berwick ===
Sherman joined the Royal Marines on 1 September 1933 when he was commissioned as a probationary second lieutenant, and would serve in a variety of roles during his career, both on land and sea. He was promoted to acting lieutenant on 18 June 1936, probationary lieutenant on 1 September 1936, and confirmed in that rank on 18 December 1936. He served on HMS Berwick commanding her detachment in an overall force of 746 marines which in May 1940 invaded Iceland during Operation Fork. The force suffered from the conditions and seasickness, however his detachment managed to capture the post office of Reykjavík and secure several key documents. The force remained in the area for a short time before being relieved by 4,000 British Army personnel, and by 1941 by an American detachment.

By November 1940, Sherman and Berwick were detached to the Mediterranean, taking part in the battles of Taranto and Cape Spartivento. Sherman was wounded while commanding his marines in one of Berwick's turrets, while seven others were killed. Sherman continued to serve on the Berwick during its battle with a German commerce raider in December, and while it escorted convoys to Russia up until 1942, whereupon Sherman left the ship. He was promoted acting major on 13 November 1942.

=== Africa, Italy and Singapore ===
Sherman was sent to the General Bernard Montgomery's Eighth Army in Egypt, taking part in Operation Baytown in September 1943 before being sent to Italy in 1944 to serve under Lieutenant-General Browning and Lord Louis Mountbatten, who was planning his Operation Zipper. Sherman arrived in Singapore and relieved the inmates of Changi Prison before being charged with setting up the surrender ceremony for the local Japanese forces of General Seishirō Itagaki. Supervised by Lady Edwina Mountbatten throughout the ceremony where the Japanese Instrument of Surrender was signed, Sherman later retained possession of the Union Flag and Malayan flag used during the surrender ceremony, which had themselves been formerly used at the Tanglin barracks.

== Post-war career ==
After the end of the war, Sherman was posted to the Cabinet Office of the British government. He was promoted acting lieutenant colonel on 1 February 1946, reverting to acting major on 18 November 1946. He regained the acting rank of lieutenant colonel on 1 January 1948, his substantive rank was still captain until 30 June 1948 when that was advanced to major. Eventually the injuries he sustained aboard HMS Berwick forced his retirement on 12 August 1950. Moving to West Africa, he worked with a trading company in Nigeria, and later as a superintendent in the Nigerian Special Constabulary. He then returned to England, joining British Aerospace in 1970. While there, he worked on the Panavia Tornado.

== Personal life and sporting career ==
Sherman married Evelyn in 1939, remaining married to her for 70 years and having three children. His son Nicholas's godmother was the secretary to General Browning during the latter part of the Second World War. Sherman was also an active sportsman. He played cricket for the MCC and for Nigeria as a bowler and wicketkeeper. He also played rugby for Wasps and the Royal Navy. He also worked for the Samaritans in Blackpool, and worked with rifle associations in Bisley until his death in 2009 at the age of 93. He died in West Sussex, England, and was survived by his two sons, daughter, wife; Evelyn and 5 grandchildren.
