= Kim Bradley (surfer) =

Australian surfer

Kim Bradley (died 26 March 2009) was an Australian surfer that pioneered surfing competitions on the island of Bali, organizing the first one in 1979. He converted to Hinduism during his time in Bali.

Kim Bradley, nicknamed 'The Fly', was born on 9 May 1955. He grew up surfing at Avalon on the Northern Peninsula of Sydney, where would work for Tracks magazine briefly, then leave to travel with David 'Mexican' Sumpter showing surf movies also surfing epic Australian waves like 'Cactus' along the way.

Kim went to Bali at 18 years of age in April/May 1974, where he would eventually marry a Balinese girl and have three children (two sons and a daughter). His friend Steven Cooney would star along with Rusty Miller in the epic surf movie 'Morning of the Earth', but it was Kim Bradley who appeared on the first wave of the same movie, appropriately enough as he would live his life out in Bali. Kim made a name for himself as a surfer who systematically searched and found many waves in Indonesia that people now surf.. He was there at Uluwatu when Gerry Lopez and Jeff Hackman were first surfing the Indonesian waves, He was always in the company of legendary surfers who could not help but like and respect him. In 1974 Gerry Lopez gave him his lightning bolt surfboard as a token of good waves and company together.

He died on 26 March 2009 in Bali.
