= Bert Axell =

British naturalist and conservationist

- Born: 1 July 1915; Rye, Sussex, England
- Died: 11 December 2001 (aged 86)
- Citizenship: British
- Scientific career
- Fields: natural history, conservation

Herbert Ernest Axell MBE (1 July 1915 – 12 November 2001) was a British naturalist and conservationist who came to prominence through his wardenships and innovations at Royal Society for the Protection of Birds (RSPB) reserves.

After taking medical retirement from the Post Office in 1952, he became the warden of the RSPB reserve at Dungeness, where he stayed until 1959. At Dungeness, Axell introduced innovations to assist in ringing birds, including special ringing pliers and mist nets.

He was appointed as warden of RSPB Minsmere in 1959, where he introduced major changes in reserve management, which were in due course also adopted elsewhere. He realised that ecological succession would eventually lead to the loss of important habitats, such as bare ground on the heaths or open water in the reed beds, unless natural plant colonisation was actively prevented. He created the "Scrape", an area with shallow water, islands and bare mud, by lowering land levels and managing the water level with new sluices. A circular path led around the scrape, giving access to hides on each of the four sides. He retired from that post in 1977.

Axell was consulted about improvements to reserves elsewhere, including major sites such as the Doñana National Park in Andalusia; he was involved in the creation of Hong Kong's Mai Po.

Bert Axell was appointed MBE in 1965.

== Books ==
- Axell, Herbert; Hosking, Eric (photographer) (1977). Minsmere: Portrait of a Bird Reserve. Hutchinson. ISBN 978-0-09-128840-2.
- Axell, Herbert (1978). Birds of Britain. Artus Publishing.
- Axell, Herbert (1982). Birdwatch Round Britain: a personal selection of Britain's bird reserves. Collins and Harvill Press. ISBN 978-0-00-262256-1.
- Axell, Herbert (1992). Of Birds and Men. Book Guild Publishing. ISBN 978-0-86332-747-6.
