= Lists of sportspeople who died during their careers =

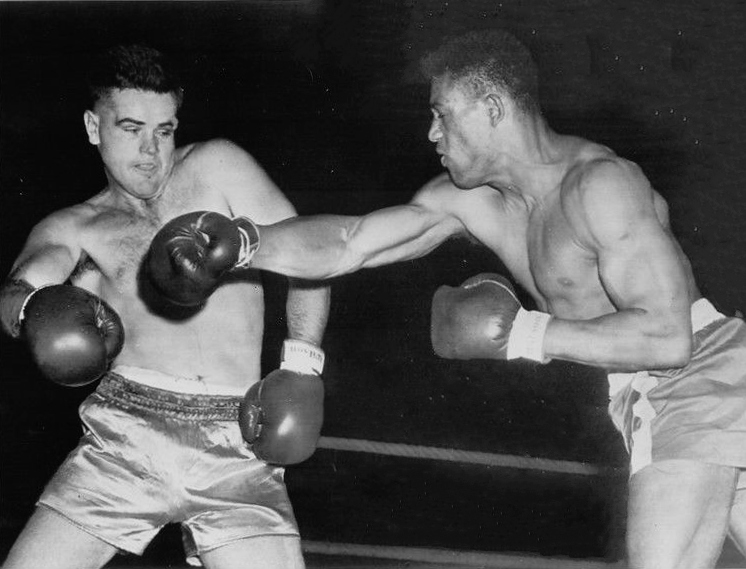
Ed Sanders (right) won Olympic gold in 1952, died of a brain injury in 1954

Sportspeople who died during their careers are covered in lists by sport, and in the case of motorsports by location.

- List of association footballers who died after on-field incidents
- Sudden cardiac death of athletes
  - List of athletics competitors who died during their careers
    - List of marathon fatalities
- List of Australian rules footballers who died during their careers
- List of basketball players who died during their careers
- List of baseball players who died during their careers
- List of deaths due to injuries sustained in boxing
- List of fatal accidents in cricket
- List of racing cyclists and pacemakers with a cycling-related death
- List of gridiron football players who died during their careers
- List of ice hockey players who died during their careers
- List of multisport and triathlon fatalities
- Fatalities in mixed martial arts contests
- List of fatal accidents in motorboat racing
- Rider deaths in motorcycle racing
  - List of Billown Course fatal accidents
  - List of Snaefell Mountain Course fatal accidents
- Driver deaths in motorsport
  - List of Brands Hatch Circuit fatal accidents
  - List of Turismo Carretera fatalities
  - List of Daytona International Speedway fatalities
  - List of Dundrod Circuit fatal accidents
  - List of Formula One fatalities
  - List of Hockenheimring fatal accidents
  - List of fatalities at the Indianapolis Motor Speedway
  - List of IndyCar fatalities
  - List of Kyalami Grand Prix Circuit fatal accidents
  - List of 24 Hours of Le Mans fatal accidents
  - List of Autodromo Nazionale Monza fatal accidents
  - List of NASCAR fatalities
  - List of Nürburgring fatal accidents
  - Driver and co-driver deaths in rallying events
    - List of Dakar Rally fatal accidents
    - List of fatal World Rally Championship accidents
  - List of Circuit de Spa-Francorchamps fatal accidents
  - List of Suzuka Circuit fatal accidents
  - List of Watkins Glen International fatalities
- List of deaths on eight-thousanders
  - List of people who died climbing Mount Everest
- Olympic and Paralympic deaths
- List of fatal accidents in sailboat racing
- List of NASCAR drivers who died during their careers
- List of premature professional wrestling deaths (This list includes wrestlers that were active or retired from the sport but died before the age of 65.)
- List of sumo wrestlers who died during their careers

=== Officials ===
- List of sports officials who died while active

== Lists of sportspeople who died in wars ==
- List of cricketers who were killed during military service
- List of footballers killed during World War II
- List of ice hockey players who died in wars
- List of Major League Baseball players who died in wars
- List of National Football League players who died in wars
- List of Olympians killed in World War I
- List of Olympians killed in World War II
- List of Wales rugby union footballers killed in the World Wars
- List of England rugby union footballers killed in the World Wars
- List of Victorian Football League players who died on active service

== See also ==
- List of accidents involving sports teams
- Lists of people by cause of death
