= List of athletics competitors who died during their careers =

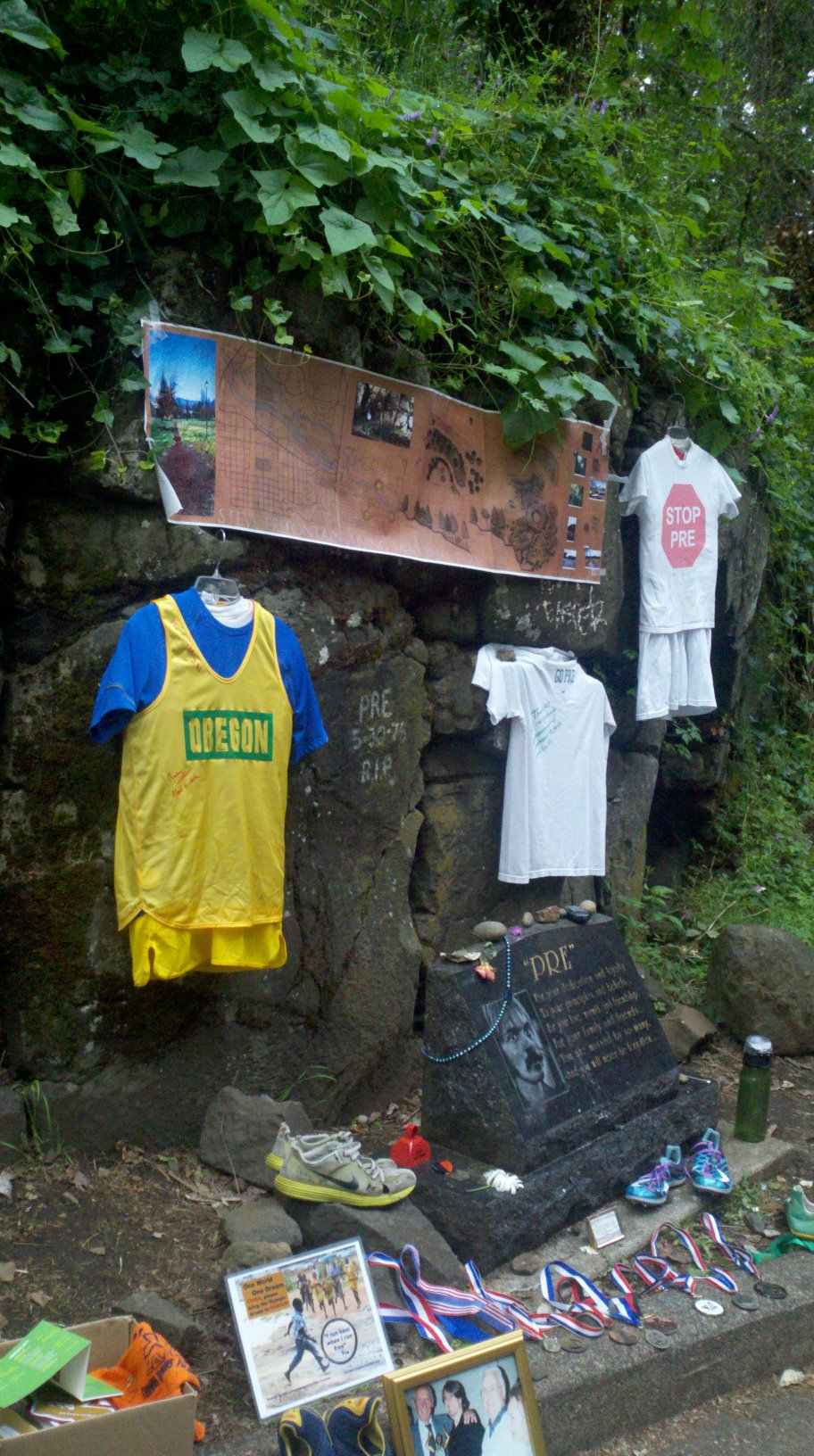
Pre's Rock, a memorial to Steve Prefontaine who died after finishing 4th in the 1972 Olympic 5000 m

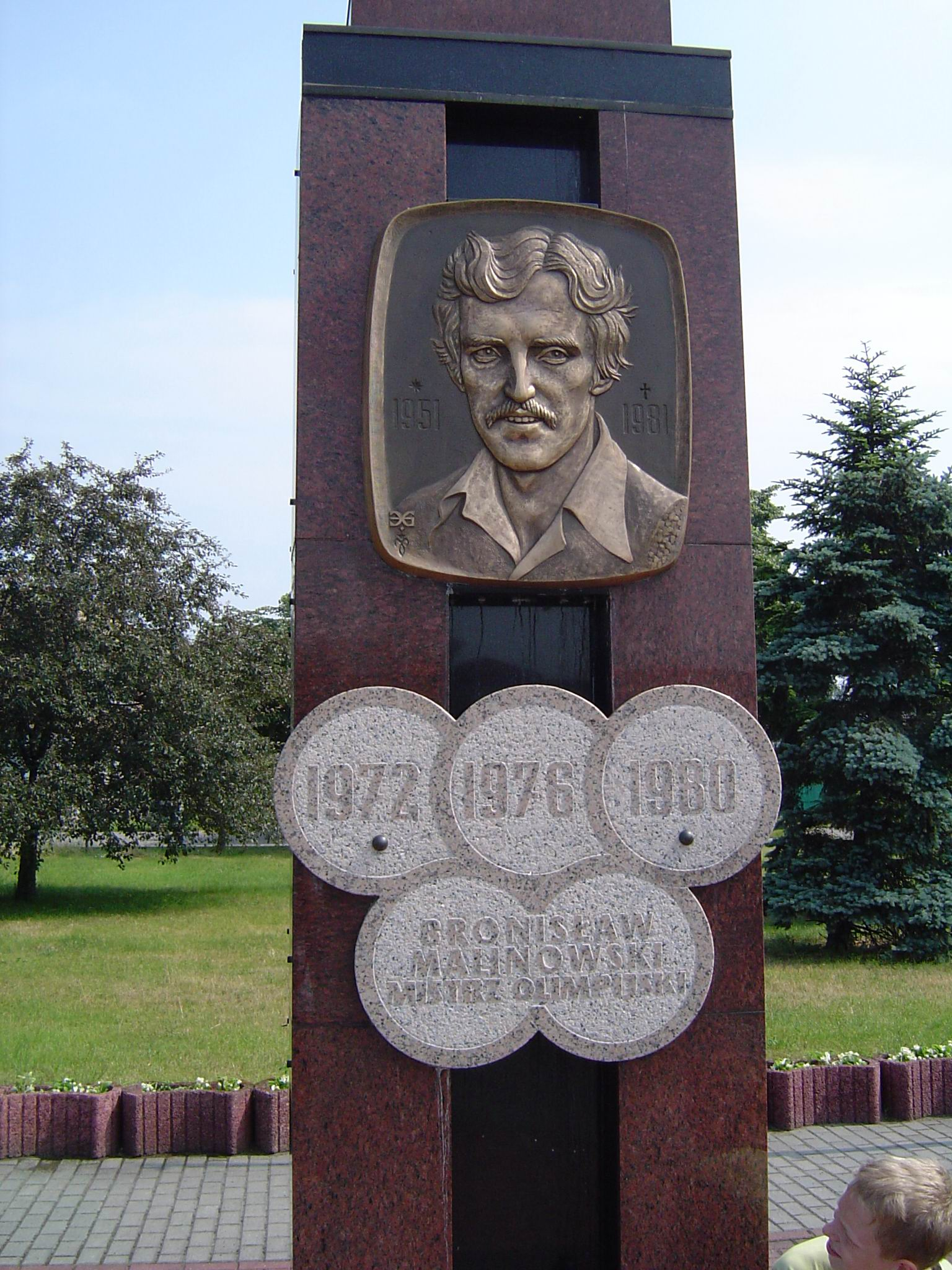
Memorial to Bronisław Malinowski, who died one year after winning an Olympic gold medal

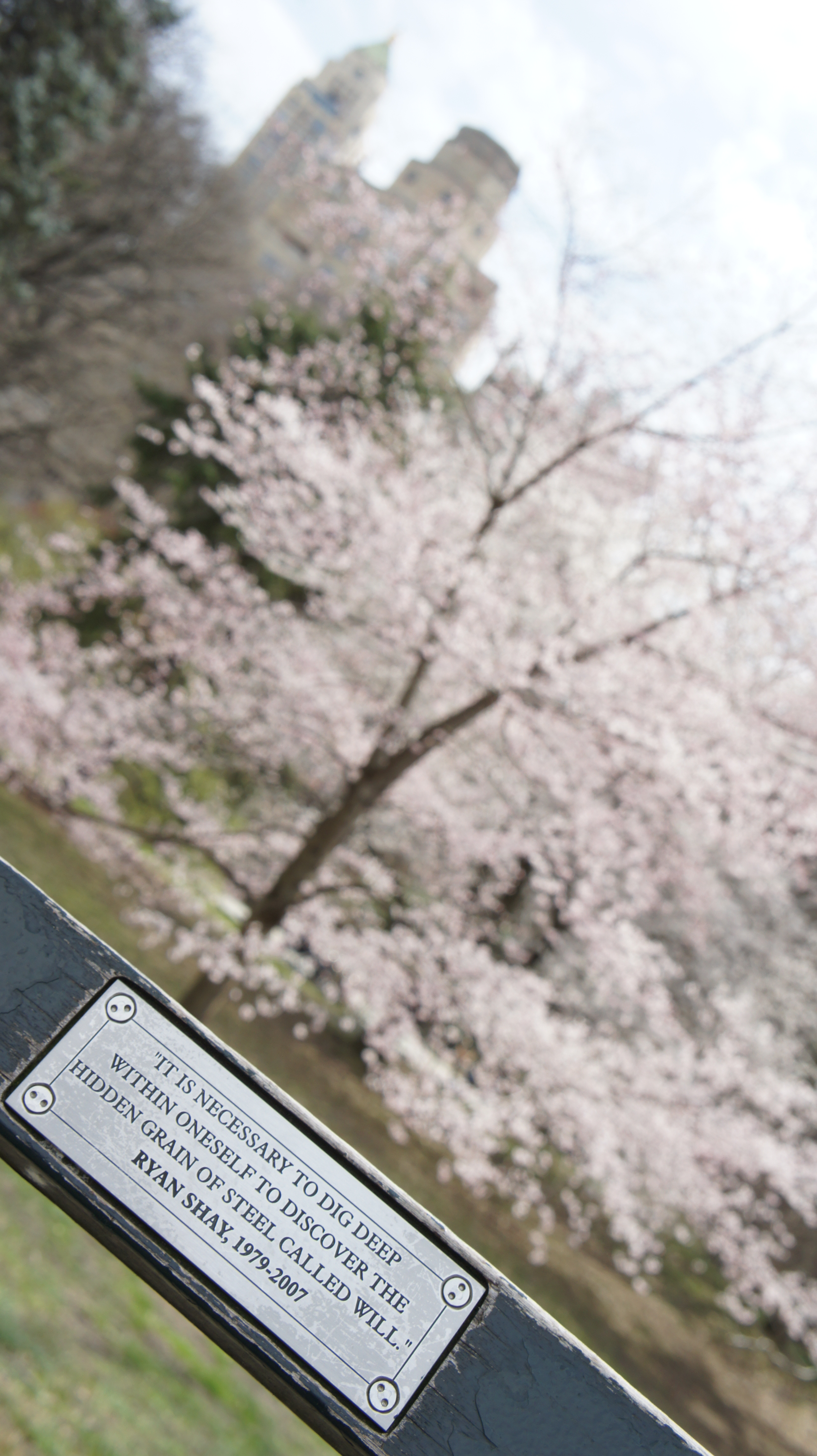
Plaque commemorating Ryan Shay, who died while running the 2008 United States Olympic trials marathon

A number of athletics competitors have died during their careers. Sometimes, the deaths came during competition or practice, while other times deaths occurred due to road accidents or other non-sports-related reasons.

The list does not include athletes who died during World War I or during World War II, when international athletics competitions were largely put on pause.

== List ==
The following is an incomplete list of athletics competitors who died or disappeared during their professional or amateur careers.

Date	Image	Name	Nationality	Age	Events	Cause
15 Jul 1912		Francisco Lázaro	Portugal	24	Marathon	Collapsed during the 1912 Olympic marathon due to dehydration and high body temperature.
18 Aug 1931		Eric Krenz	United States	25	Discus throw	Drowning.
15 Apr 1933		George Saling	United States	23	110 metres hurdles	Car accident.
30 Jun 1946		Donato Pavesi	Italy	57	10 kilometres walk	Died while racewalking during a race held in his honor.
11 Nov 1950		Les McKeand	Australia	26	Triple jump, javelin throw	Car accident.
15 Dec 1950		Jaakko Jouppila	Finland	27	Shot put	Murder-suicide of his wife.
26 Aug 1951		Jakob Jutz	Switzerland	35-36	Marathon	Suffered heart failure while running the 1951 Swiss Marathon Championships.
2 Aug 1960		Bob Gutowski	United States	25	Pole vault	Car accident.
29 Sep 1962		Owe Jonsson	Sweden	21	200 metres	Car accident.
11 Dec 1962		Jorma Valkama	Finland	34	Long jump	Car accident.
9 Jan 1968		Kōkichi Tsuburaya	Japan	27	Marathon	Suicide.
23 Nov 1968		Aurelio Janet	Cuba	23	Javelin throw	Car accident.
22 Dec 1969		Rolf Hoppe	Chile	24	Javelin throw	Car accident.
8 Dec 1971		A. K. M. Miraj Uddin	Bangladesh	23	Pole vault, long jump, 110 metres hurdles	Disappearance after capture by Pakistani army.
17 Feb 1973		Ezra Burnham	Barbados	25	400 metres	Car accident.
30 May 1975		Steve Prefontaine	United States	24	5000 metres, 10,000 metres, mile	Car accident.
29 Dec 1976		Ivo Van Damme	Belgium	24	800 metres, 1500 metres	Car accident.
7 Jun 1977		Jim Buchanan	Canada	21	Long jump	Car accident.
26 Aug 1977		Tadeusz Zieliński	Poland	31	3000 metres steeplechase	Car accident.
Jul 1981		Dele Udo	Nigeria	24	400 metres	Killed by a Nigerian police officer following an argument.
27 Sep 1981		Bronisław Malinowski	Poland	30	3000 metres steeplechase	Car accident.
12 Nov 1984		Christopher Brathwaite	Trinidad and Tobago	36	100 metres, 200 metres	Murdered by a sniper.
29 May 1990		Mohamed Shah Alam	Bangladesh	27	100 metres, 200 metres	Motorcycle accident.
23 Aug 1990		Yutaka Kanai	Japan	30	10,000 metres	Car accident.
23 Aug 1990		Tomoyuki Taniguchi	Japan	29	Marathon	Car accident.
1 Sep 1992		Desta Asgedom	Ethiopia	20	1500 metres, 800 metres	Struck by a pickup truck, ruled a suicide.
6 Apr 1993		Miguel Ángel Gómez	Spain	24	200 metres	Motorcycle accident.
29 Mar 1994		Paul Spangler	United States	95	1500 metres to Marathon	Masters world record holder died on his daily 7 mile training run
13 Aug 1994		Simon Robert Naali	Tanzania	28	Marathon	Died from hit-and-run injuries.
1 Oct 1994		Oluyemi Kayode	Nigeria	26	200 metres	Car accident.
18 Sep 1995		Oleh Tverdokhlib	Ukraine	25	400 metres hurdles	Electric shock
29 Jul 1996		Georgi Dakov	Bulgaria	28	High jump	Car accident.
8 Aug 1998		Walter Merlo	Italy	33	Long-distance running	Fell from the Corno Stella mountain.
7 Sep 2000		Hyginus Anugo	Nigeria	22	400 metres	Car accident.
31 Mar 2001		Diego García	Spain	39	Marathon	Sudden cardiac death during a training run.
4 Aug 2003		Pål Arne Fagernes	Norway	29	Javelin throw	Car accident.
25 Dec 2004		Ian Syster	South Africa	28	Marathon	Died from Drowning after a car accident.
14 Aug 2004		Robert Howard	United States	28	Triple jump	Murder-suicide of his wife.
27 May 2005		Piotr Gładki	Poland	33	Marathon	Car accident.
5 Jun 2005		Matic Šušteršič	Slovenia	25	60 metres, 100 metres	Car accident along with two other Slovenian athletes, Patrik Cvetan (23) and Nejc Lipnik (17).
9 Sep 2006		Émilie Mondor	Canada	25	5000 metres	Car crash.
21 Jan 2007		Maria Cioncan	Romania	29	1500 metres	Car accident.
3 Nov 2007		Ryan Shay	United States	28	Marathon	Collapsed during the U.S. marathon trials for the 2008 Olympics, died due to heart failure and cardiac arrhythmia.
16 Jun 2008		Tom Compernolle	Belgium	32	5000 metres	Car accident.
18 Feb 2009		Kamila Skolimowska	Poland	26	Hammer throw	Pulmonary embolism.
29 Aug 2010		Dejene Berhanu	Ethiopia	29	5000 metres	Suicide.
11 Sep 2010		Taavi Peetre	Estonia	27	Shot put, discus throw	Boat accident.
15 May 2011		Samuel Wanjiru	Kenya	24	Marathon	Fall from balcony.
26 Jun 2012		Daniel Batman	Australia	31	200 metres, 400 metres	Car crash.
5 Dec 2012		Yves Niaré	France	35	Shot put	Car crash.
19 Jan 2013		Abderrahim Goumri	Morocco	36	Marathon	Car crash; died one year into his doping ban.
10 Jul 2014		Peter Mutuku	Kenya	20	3000 metres steeplechase	Car crash.
28 Jul 2014		Torrin Lawrence	United States	25	400 metres	Car crash.
Oct 2015		Yuliya Balykina	Belarus	31	100 metres	Murdered by boyfriend.
28 Aug 2017		David Torrence	Peru	31	1500 metres, 5000 metres	Drowning.
8 Aug 2018		Nicholas Bett	Kenya	28	400 metres hurdles	Car accident.
19 Aug 2019		Margarita Plavunova	Russia	25	100 metres hurdles, 400 metres hurdles	Acute heart failure while jogging.
7 Jan 2020		Kennedy Njiru	Kenya	32-33	3000 metres steeplechase	Car accident.
4 Feb 2020		Abadi Hadis	Ethiopia	22	5000 metres, 10000 metres	Unspecified illness.
26 Feb 2020		Braian Toledo	Argentina	26	Javelin throw	Motorcycle crash.
24 Sep 2020		Ondřej Hodboď	Czech Republic	19	3000 metres steeplechase	Suicide.
8 Nov 2020		Clevonte Lodge-Bean	Bermuda	18	400 metres	Car crash.
22 May 2021		Liang Jing	China	31	Ultramarathon	Gansu ultramarathon disaster.
22 May 2021		Huang Guanjun	China	33-34	Ultramarathon	Gansu ultramarathon disaster.
26 Jun 2021		Abdalelah Haroun	Qatar	24	400 metres	Car accident.
9 Aug 2021		Cameron Burrell	United States	26	100 metres, long jump	Suicide.
13 Oct 2021		Agnes Tirop	Kenya	25	10,000 metres, cross country	Stabbing.
Sep 2021		Jason Carty	Great Britain	51	60 metres, 100 metres	Lung cancer.
22 Oct 2021		Álex Quiñónez	Ecuador	32	200 metres, 100 metres	Murdered outside a shopping centre.
10 Jan 2022		Deon Lendore	Trinidad and Tobago	29	400 metres	Car crash.
16 Apr 2022		Damaris Muthee	Bahrain	28	5000 metres, cross country	Murdered.
24 Apr 2022		Kaushalya Madushani	Sri Lanka	26	400 metres hurdles	Suicide.
23 Jan 2023		Edrissa Marong	Gambia	27	800 metres	Unspecified illness.
23 Apr 2023		Tori Bowie	United States	32	100 metres, long jump	Complications of childbirth.
23 Apr 2023		Samuel Kiplimo Kosgei	Kenya	37	Marathon	Road accident.
31 Aug 2023		Mbuleli Mathanga	South Africa	29	5000 metres, 10000 metres, Half marathon	Apparent suicide.
31 Dec 2023		Benjamin Kiplagat	Uganda	34	3000 metres steeplechase	Stabbed to death.
11 Feb 2024		Kelvin Kiptum	Kenya	24	Marathon	Car accident.
5 September 2024		Rebecca Cheptegei	Uganda	33	Marathon	Murdered.

== Former athletics competitors who died during other sporting careers ==
- Max Houben, who competed in the 1920 Olympic 200 m and died during his bobsleigh career in 1949
- Stone Johnson, who competed in the 1960 Olympic 200 m and died during his American Football League career in 1963

== See also ==
- List of marathon fatalities
- Lists of sportspeople who died during their careers
