= Track and field at the 2011 Military World Games – Women's 5000 metres =

The women's 5000 metres event at the 2011 Military World Games was held on 22 July at the Estádio Olímpico João Havelange.

== Records ==
Prior to this competition, the existing world and CISM record were as follows:

World Record	Tirunesh Dibaba (ETH)	14:11.15	Oslo, Norway	6 June 2008
CISM World Record	Sabrina Mockenhaupt (GER)	15:16.32	Tivoli, Italy	6 September 2002

== Schedule ==
Date	Time	Round
22 July 2011	10:25	Final

== Medalists ==
Gold	Silver	Bronze
Shitaye Habtegebrel; Bahrain	Tejitu Chalchissa; Bahrain	Rebecca Cheptegei; Uganda

== Results ==
=== Final ===
Rank	Name	Nationality	Time	Notes
1st place, gold medalist(s)	Shitaye Habtegebrel	Bahrain	15:52.84	
2nd place, silver medalist(s)	Tejitu Chalchissa	Bahrain	15:54.51	
3rd place, bronze medalist(s)	Rebecca Cheptegei	Uganda	16:00.26	
4	Kaltoum Bouaasayriya	Morocco	16:09.72	
5	Claudette Mukasakindi	Rwanda	16:22.08	
6	Wei Yanan	China	16:28.82	
7	Samira Mezeghrane	France	16:31.41	
8	Chuan Luo	China	16:50.95	
9	Hajiba Hasnaoui	Morocco	16:56.88	
10	Alice Rocquain	France	16:58.66	
11	Amira Ben Amor	Tunisia	17:01.58	
12	Mihaela Botezan	Romania	17:35.85	
13	Sitan Bouare	Mali	18:28.76	
14	Ilsida Toemere	Suriname	19:01.53	
15	Celine Best	Canada	19:51.29	
16	Nyarai Katsande	Zimbabwe	20:14.64	
17	Tovanovic Nevena	Serbia	20:16.60	
	Iness Chenonge	Kenya	DNF	
	Georgette Mink	Canada	DNF	
	Zalia Aliou	Togo	DNS	
	Kelly Calway	United States	DNS	
	Rasa Drazdauskaitė	Lithuania	DNS	
	Mercy Njoroge	Kenya	DNS	
