= Driver and co-driver deaths in rallying events =

== Deaths in SCCA ProRally, Rally America and ARA Rally ==
Name	Role	Date of accident	Event	Car	During
(New Zealand) John Woolf	Driver	2 May 1982	Chisum Trail Rally	Mazda RX-3	Rally
(New Zealand) Grant Whittaker	Co-driver	2 May 1982	Chisum Trail Rally	Mazda RX-3	Rally
(United States) Larry Newland	Driver	5 November 1982	Press-on-Regardless Rally	Jeep	Rally
(United States) Jonel Broscanc	Driver	6 June 1992	Susquehannock Trail Performance Rally	Audi Quattro	Rally
(United States) Rosemary Tindall	Co-driver	22 March 1994	1994 Doo Wop III & IV Pro Rally	Mazda RX-3	Rally
(United States) Carl Merrill	Driver	2 October 1998	Prescott Forest Rally XI	Ford Escort Cosworth	Rally
(United States) Sandor "Sean" Kovacs Jr	Co-driver	6 May 2000	Ski Sawmill ClubRally	Toyota Celica All-Trac	Rally
(United Kingdom) Mark Lovell	Driver	12 July 2003	Oregon Trail Rally	Subaru Impreza WRX	Rally
(United Kingdom) Roger Freeman	Co-driver	12 July 2003	Oregon Trail Rally	Subaru Impreza WRX	Rally
(United States) Matthew Marker	Driver	30 April 2011	Olympus Rally	Subaru Impreza	Rally
(United States) Erin Kelly	Co-driver	14 July 2023	New England Forest Rally	Subaru Impreza	Rally
(Slovakia) Kubo Kordisch	Driver	4 November 2023	Show Me Rally	Ford Fiesta ST	Rally
(United States) Neil Carlinschauer	Driver	2 December 2023	Nemandji Forest Rally	Ford Mustang SVO	Rally

== Deaths in European Rally Championship ==
Name	Role	Date of accident	Event	Car	During
(Switzerland) Michel Wyder	Co-driver	31 May 1986	ADAC Rallye Hessen 1986	Ford RS200	Rally
(Czech Republic) Marián Határ	Driver	6 November 1986	Int. Semperit Rallye 1986	Škoda 130 LR	Rally
(Germany) Sven Behling	Co-driver	4 July 1997	16th ADAC-Deutschland Rallye	Subaru Impreza	Rally
(Germany) Olaf Süß	Co-driver	1 May 1998	Int. Pirelli Pyhrn-Eisenwurzen Rallye 1998	Fiat Cinquecento Abarth	Rally
(Germany) Rüdiger Süß	Driver	8 May 1998	Int. Pirelli Pyhrn-Eisenwurzen Rallye 1998	Fiat Cinquecento Abarth	Rally
(France) Jean-Luc Rinaldi	Driver	29 October 2000	Rallye d'Antibes - Rallye d'Azur 2000	Peugeot 106	Rally
(Italy) Loris Roggia	Co-driver	20 June 2003	Rally del Salento 2003	Peugeot 206 S1600	Rally
(Serbia and Montenegro) Mirko Martinovic	Driver	21 September 2003	YU Rally	Renault Clio Williams	Rally
(Greece) Dimitris Kolopianos	Driver	26 September 2003	Achaia ELPA Rally 2003	Toyota Yaris	Rally
(Czech Republic) Luděk Kocman	Co-driver	24 August 2007	Barum Rally Zlín 2007	Opel Astra GSi 16V	Rally
(Italy) Guglielmini Flavio	Co-driver	19 July 2009	Rally Bulgaria 2009	Peugeot 207 S2000	Rally

== Deaths in European National Series and National Rallies ==
Name	Role	Date of accident	Event	Country	Car	During
(Netherlands) Jhr. Loten van Doelen Grothe	Co-driver	19 January 1932	11ème Rallye Automobile de Monte-Carlo	France	Ford	Rally
(Denmark) Hans Christensen	Driver	January 1932	11ème Rallye Automobile de Monte-Carlo	France	Graham-Paige	Displacement stage
(Spain) Francisco Arderiu	Co-driver	17 December 1954	2º Rallye del R.A.C.E.	Spain	Jaguar XK120	Rally
(Belgium) Jean Roger Anne	Driver	26 September 1959	Tour de Luxembourg	Luxembourg	Triumph	Rally
(France) Marguerite Accarie	Driver	2 May 1970	28ème Rallye Paris - Saint-Raphaël Féminin	France		Rally
(Spain) Arcadio Aranda	Driver	18 July 1982	II Rallye Costa de la Luz	Spain	Renault 5 Turbo	Rally
(United Kingdom) Dave Adams	Co-driver	28 February 1988	Longleat Stages Rally	United Kingdom	MG Metro 6R4	Rally
(Hungary) Sándor Ajtai	Co-driver	23 June 1991	Express Rally - Hungarian National Rally Championship	Hungary	Lancia Delta Integrale	Rally
(Poland) Grzegorz Kłosiński	Co-driver	6 July 1991	Rajd Festiwalowy - Polish Rally Championship	Poland	Suzuki Swift GTi 1300 N-1	Rally
(Sweden) Anders Larsson	Driver	September 1992	Dalslandsrallyt	Sweden	Opel Ascona	Rally
(Spain) Tomás Viera	Co-driver	31 October 1992	XIV Rallye Isla de Lanzarote	Spain		Rally
(France) Thierry Renaud	Co-driver	1 April 1995	Rally Grasse-Alpin- French Rallye Championship	French	Renault Clio Maxi	Rally
(Germany) Martin Holtkamp	Driver	22 September 1995	Rallye Lipperland-Kaledonien	Germany	Ford Escort	Rally
(Sweden) Mats Åkesson	Co-driver	5 January 2003	Bergslagsrallyt	Sweden	Volvo 240	Rally
(United Kingdom) Susan Cameron	Co-driver	11 October 2003	Tour of Mull Rally - Scottish Tarmack Rally Championship	United Kingdom	Peugeot 205	Rally
(Russia) Dmitry Chicherin	Driver	21 May 2006	Rally Sestroreck - Russian Rally Cup	Russia	Honda Civic	Rally
(Ukraine) Andriy Aleksandrov	Driver	2 September 2007	28th Rally Sliven - European Rally Cup East		Subaru Impreza	Rally
(Russia) Vaclav Grokhovskiy	Driver	20 June 2013	Rally Belye Nochi - Russian Rally Cup	Russia	Mitsubishi Lancer	Reconnaissance
(Ukraine) Sergiy Korobeinkov	Driver	9 September 2017	Rally Bukovina - Ukrainian Rally Championship	Ukraine	GAZ-24	Rally
(France) Anthony Mora	Driver	8 October 2017	Rallye de Sarlat - French Rally Cup	France	Peugeot 208 T16 R5	Rally
(Wales) Dai Roberts	Co-Driver	24 May 2025	Jim Clark Rally - British Rally Championship	United Kingdom	Hyundai i20 N Rally 2	Rally

== Deaths in African Rally Championship and African Rallies ==
Name	Role	Date of accident	Event	Car	During
(Kenya) Somak Raj	Driver	April 1957	5th Coronation Safari Rally	Simca Aronde	Rally
(Kenya) Charlie Sofi	Co-driver	April 1957	5th Coronation Safari Rally	Simca Aronde	Rally
(Turkey) Âli Sipahi	Driver	1 June 1980	Uluslararası Günaydın'ın Türkiye Rallisi - Turkish Rally Championship	Tofaş Murat 131	Rally
(Kenya) Tanveer Alam	Driver	May 1996	Mombasa Rally	Subaru Legacy	Private Test
(Tanzania) Khalid Bakhressa, Jr.	Driver	16 December 2007	Zanzibar Rally - Tanzania Rally Championship	Subaru Impreza N12	Rally
(South Africa) Paul Pfeiffer	Driver	4 October 2008	Blue Crane Rally - Western Cape Rally Championship	Mitsubishi Lancer Evo VI	Rally
(Uganda) Riyaz Kurji	Driver	2 May 2009	Pearl of Africa Uganda Rally - African Rally Championship	Subaru Impreza N8	Rally

== Deaths in Oceanian National Series and National Rallies ==
Name	Role	Date of accident	Event	Country	Car	During
(Taiwan) Marc Dinh	Driver	1974	New Caledonian Safari	New Caledonia	Toyota Celica	Reconnaissance
(New Zealand) David Batty	Driver	30 May 1981	Rally of Southland - New Zealand Rally Championship	New Zealand	Toyota Corolla	Rally
(Australia) Lincoln Harding	Co-driver	21 April 1990	Rally of Clare - South Australia Rally Championship	Australia		Rally
(Australia) Steve Turner	Driver	1994	11th Robertstown Rally - South Australia Rally Championship	Australia	Ford TX3 Lazer	Rally
(Australia) Ian Johnston	Co-driver	20 April 1996	Targa Tasmania - Australian Targa Championship	Australia		Rally
(Australia) Vaun Guthrie	Driver	20 February 1999	Rally Tasmania - Tasmanian Rally Championship	Australia	Subaru Impreza WRX STi	Rally
(Australia) Vic Huddlestone	Co-driver	20 February 1999	Rally Tasmania - Tasmanian Rally Championship	Australia	Subaru Impreza WRX STi	Rally
(Australia) Steve Poore	Driver	20 February 1999	Rally Akademos	Australia	Subaru Legacy RS Turbo	Rally
(Australia) Paul Bazzica	Co-driver	25 October 2003	Stirling Stages Rally - West Australia Rally Championship	Australia	Daytona Sportscar	Rally
(Australia) Douglas Briese	Driver	29 October 2004	East Coast Targa	Australia	Porsche 911	Rally
(Australia) Peter Knights	Driver	18 June 2006	Eden Valley Rally - South Australia Rally Championship	Australia		Reconnaissance
(Australia) Peter Brock	Driver	8 September 2006	Targa West	Australia	Daytona Coupe	Rally
(Australia) Adam Plate	Driver	24 August 2012	II Targa Adelaide - Australian Targa Championship	Australia	Mitsubishi Lancer Evo VII	Rally
(Australia) John Mansell	Driver	17 April 2013	22nd Targa Tasmania - Australian Targa Championship	Australia	Porsche Cayman	Rally
(Australia) James McIntosh	Co-driver	14 July 2013	Rally of Queensland - Queensland Rally Championship	Australia	Subaru Impreza Sti	Rally

== Deaths in other rally races ==
- XU Lang, Trans-oriental Rally, 16 June 2008
- Johnny Moacdieh, Rally of Lebanon, 18 June 1995
