= Rebecca Cheptegei =

Ugandan athlete (1991–2024)

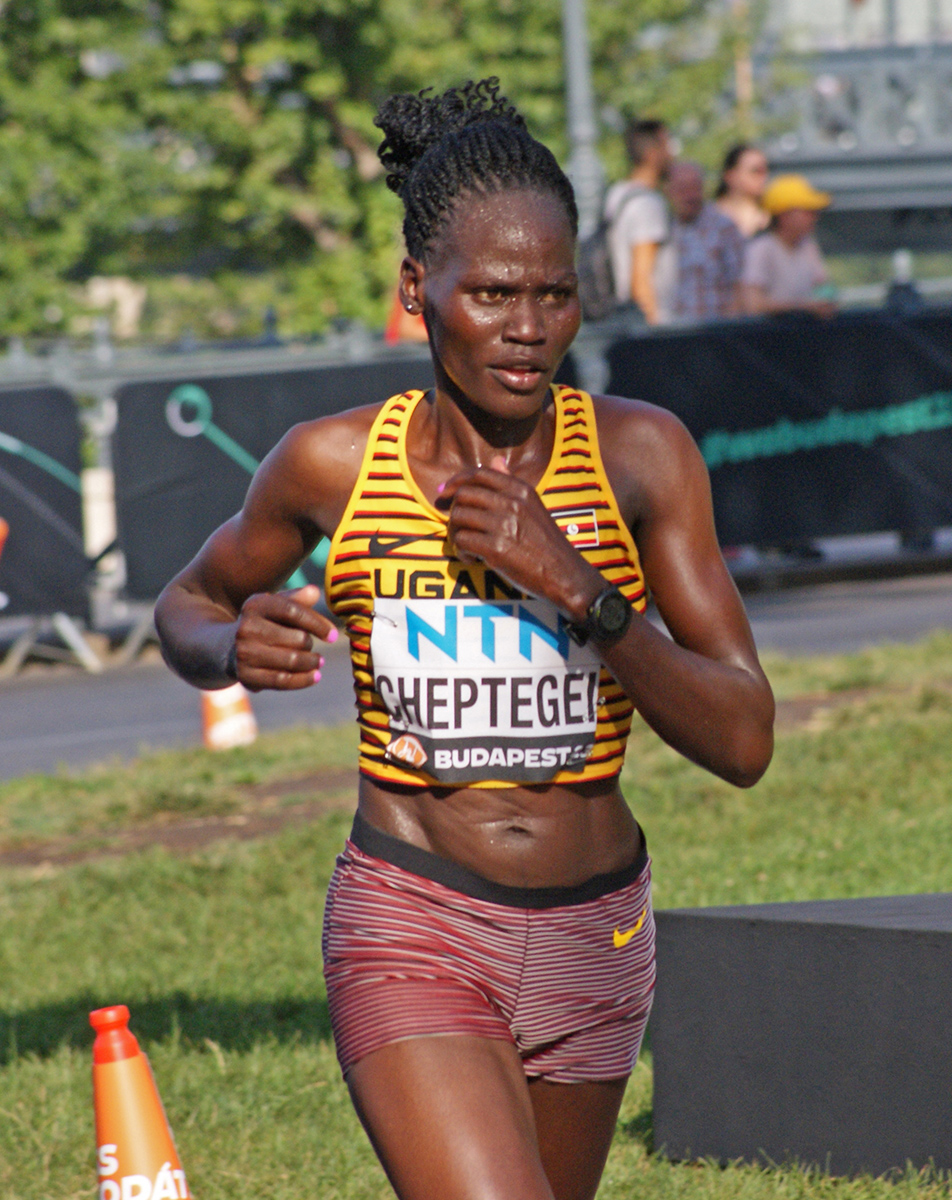
- Cheptegei at the 2023 World Athletics Championships

Personal information
- Nationality: Ugandan
- Born: 22 February 1991 Kenya
- Died: 5 September 2024 (aged 33) Eldoret, Kenya

Sport
- Sport: Athletics
- Events: Cross country running, Long distance running

Rebecca Cheptegei (22 February 1991 – 5 September 2024) was a Ugandan cross country, long-distance and marathon runner, who was the national record holder in the latter discipline and a former world champion in mountain running.

Cheptegei represented Uganda at several World Championships since 2010, including IAAF World Cross Country Championships, World Mountain and Trail Running Championships and World Athletics Championships. She also competed in the women's marathon at the 2024 Summer Olympics in Paris. She was killed in September 2024 by her former partner, Dickson Ndiema Marangach, who doused her with petrol and set her alight, reportedly over a land dispute in Kenya.

== Personal life ==
Rebecca Cheptegei was born on the Kenyan side of the Kenya–Uganda border on 22 February 1991 to Joseph and Agnes Cheptegei and was the second of 13 siblings. Her ancestral village was Bukwo in Uganda. She later moved to the village of Chepkum in Kenya and bought property there to be closer to athletic training centres. She had two children with her estranged husband, Simon Ayeko, and was formerly in a relationship with Dickson Ndiema Marangach. She joined the Uganda People's Defence Force in 2008 and rose to become a sergeant. She was also a member of its athletics club.

== Athletic career ==
She finished 15th in the U20 race in the 38th IAAF World Cross Country Championships at Myslecinek Park in Bydgoszcz, Poland, in 2010. In May of the same year, she won the 1500m race at the München Pfingstmeeting in Munich, Germany, before going on to finish 19th in the 800m race at Rehlingen Pfingstsportfest in Rehlingen two days later. She participated in the Regensburg Sparkassen-Gala 1500m race, where she finished 15th. Cheptegei participated in the Janusz Kusociński Memorial 1500m race in Warsaw, finishing 10th and won the Kampala 10,000 m race in Kampala, Uganda, all in 2010.

In 2011, Cheptegei started the year finishing 55th in the senior race final at the 39th IAAF World Cross Country Championships, Punta Umbria. She came 2nd at the Madrid Half Marathon. She later finished 3rd in the Camargo Spanish 10,000 m Road Running Championships in Camargo, and then participated in the Rio de Janeiro CISM Military World Games Women's 5000 metres. She came in 2nd in the Cantalejo Half Marathon before finishing off 10th at the 10 km race at the Lisbon São Silvestre da Amadora.

Cheptegei finished 68th in the senior race at the 40th IAAF World Cross Country Championships in Bydgoszcz, in 2013. She also won the 47th iteration of the Cross Internacional Ciutat de Granollers. She concluded the year by winning the 10,000 m in the Crevillente San Silvestre. Cheptegei finished 14th in the 5000 m at the Meeting Iberoamericano de Atletismo, Huelva, in 2014, and 8th in the 3000m race at the Bilbao Reunion Internacional de Atletismo. She went on to win the Santa Pola 10 km and finished 3rd in the 2014 African Cross Country Championships in Kampala.

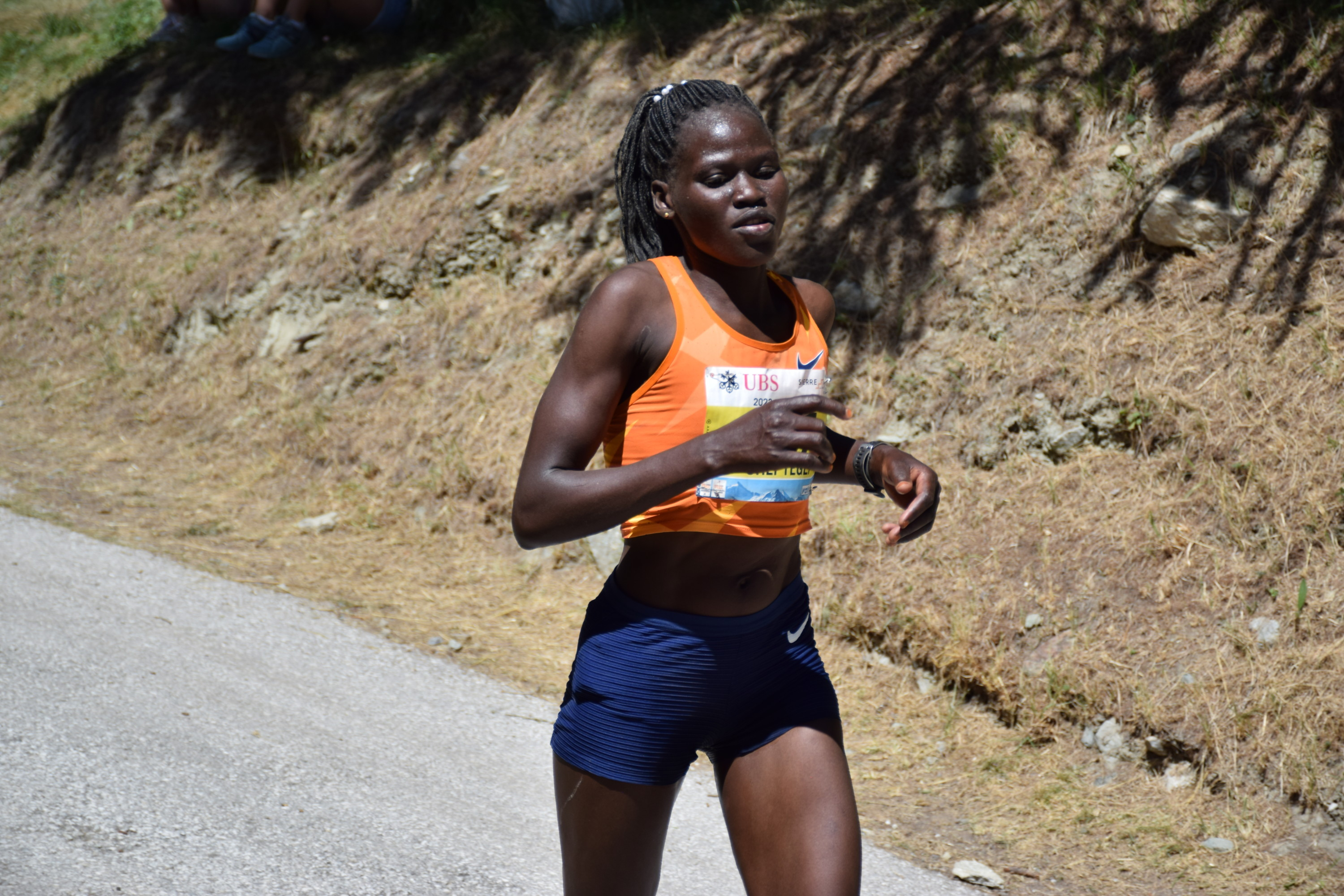
Cheptegei at Sierre-Zinal in 2022

Cheptegei finished 3rd in the Quanzhou Half Marathon in 2016, and 12th in the Shanghai Half Marathon in 2017. In the same year, she finished 3rd and 2nd in the 5 km and 10,000 m race, respectively, at the Kampala Ugandan Championships. She ended the year in 4th place at the Brazzaville Half Marathon. In 2019, she finished 2nd in the Semi Marathon Eiffage de Dakar, Dakar and 5th in the 10,000 m at the Ugandan Champions Mandela National Stadium, Kampala. Due to COVID-19 restrictions, Cheptegei did not race again until 2021, when she earned 3rd and 5th place finishes in the 4th and 7th UAF Trials at Mandela National Stadium in Kampala respectively. She finished 47th in the Eldoret City Marathon before coming in 2nd in the Kampala Half Marathon later that year.

Cheptegei won the 2022 Padova Marathon and was 2nd in the 10,000 m at the Ugandan Championships in Kampala. In the same year, she set a Ugandan national record of 2:22:47 in the marathon event, and won the postponed 2021 World Mountain and Trail Running Championships in Chiang Mai, Thailand. She ended the year with a 4th place finish in the ADNOC Abu Dhabi Marathon. This earned her a place to represent Uganda in the 2024 Summer Olympics in Paris. In 2023, she finished second at the Florence Marathon and 14th at the 2023 World Championships in Budapest.

In 2024, she qualified and competed for Uganda in the women's marathon at the Summer Olympics in Paris, finishing in 44th place.

== Death and legacy ==
On 1 September 2024, Cheptegei was attacked and set on fire in her residence in Endebess, Trans-Nzoia County, Kenya. She sustained burns covering 80% of her body, leaving her in critical condition in hospital. Police stated that Dickson Ndiema Marangach, her former partner, doused her with petrol and set her ablaze. It was reported that Marangach attacked her after an argument about the property she had purchased, and he was also hospitalized after being injured in the attack. Cheptegei died due to multiple organ failure as a result of her burns at the Moi Teaching and Referral Hospital in Eldoret on 5 September, at the age of 33. Marangach died in the same hospital as Cheptegei on 9 September after sustaining burn injuries to 40% of his body. At the time of Marangach's death, police had planned to charge him with Cheptegei's murder.

Cheptegei's death brought renewed attention to gender-based violence in Kenya, with Cheptegei being the fourth athlete in the country to have been killed under similar circumstances since 2021. A funeral procession was held for Cheptegei in Eldoret on 13 September and was also attended by activists denouncing gender-based violence. Her remains were then taken to Uganda, where she was buried with military honours in Bukwo on 14 September.

On 6 September, the Mayor of Paris, Anne Hidalgo, announced the city will honour Cheptegei by naming a sports venue after her. At the end of the women's marathon of the Paralympics, on 8 September, the organising committee held a minute of applause in her honour. Officials in Bukwo proposed naming a road and a sports venue after her, while the Ugandan government pledged to provide around $13,000 to each of Cheptegei's children.

== See also ==
- Bride burning
- Death by burning
- List of athletics competitors who died during their careers
- Agnes Tirop, a Kenyan runner, murdered by her husband
