= List of marathon fatalities =

Below is a sortable list of individuals who died as a result of running a marathon.

== Causes of death during the marathon ==
The most frequent causes are:

1. sudden cardiac death, triggered by a congenital or acquired heart disorder (ion channelopathies);
2. exercise-associated hyponatremia or other electrolyte imbalance;
3. exertional heat stroke or severe hyperthermia.

The age distribution ranges widely, from the teens through the sixties.

In 2016, a systematic medical review found that the risk of sudden cardiac death during or immediately after a marathon was between 0.6 and 1.9 deaths per 100,000 participants, varying across the specific studies and the methods used, and not controlling for age or gender. This translates to a few published marathon deaths worldwide in a typical year, although the authors lamented the lack of a central registry for the information.

The second major risk arises from imbalanced fluid or electrolyte levels, particularly hyponatremia (sodium deficiency, overhydration, or water intoxication). As a marathon medical director described the counter-intuitive and under-publicized risk in 2005: "There are no reported cases of dehydration causing death in the history of world running, but there are plenty of cases of people dying of hyponatremia."

Heat stroke is an emergency condition in which thermoregulation fails and the body temperature rises above 104 °F (40 °C). It becomes a greater risk in warm and humid weather.

== List ==
Origin	Name [ref.]	Age	Marathon date	Event	Location	Cause / Notes
POR	Francisco Lázaro	24	15 July 1912	Olympic Marathon	Stockholm, Sweden	Electrolyte imbalance
SUI	Jakob Jutz	35-36	26 August 1951	Swiss Athletics Federation Marathon Championships	Cham, Switzerland	Heart failure
FRA	Jacques Bussereau	48	28 October 1984	New York City Marathon	New York City, US	Heart attack
GBR	Duncan Kerr	28	22 September 1985	Glasgow Marathon	Glasgow, UK	Pneumonia
GER	Hans Hägele	36	1987	Marathon Hamburg	Hamburg, Germany	
USA	Martin A. Wurst, Jr.	32	2 November 1986	Marine Corps Marathon	Washington, D.C., US	Coronary artery disease
USA	Edwin Brown	47	14 December 1986	Dallas Marathon	Dallas, US	Heart attack
USA	Thomas Becker	40	8 October 1989	Twin Cities Marathon	Minneapolis, US	Heart attack
USA	William McKinney	59	4 March 1990	Los Angeles Marathon	Los Angeles, US	Heart attack
USA	Lisa B. Christensen	19	4 November 1990	Marine Corps Marathon	Washington, D.C., US	Coronary artery abnormality
USA	Julius Becza	58	24 October 1993	Marine Corps Marathon	Washington, D.C., US	Heart attack
USA	Samuel Grafton	42	16 October 1994	Detroit Marathon	Detroit, US	Heart attack
SWI	Pierre Marguet	27	6 November 1994	New York City Marathon	New York City, US	Heart attack; also for an unnamed second fatality
SWE	Humphrey Siesage	61	15 April 1996	Boston Marathon	Boston, US	Heart attack
GBR	Anna Loyley	26	8 March 1998	Bath Half Marathon	London, UK	Sudden arrhythmic death syndrome
USA	Kelly Barrett	43	11 October 1998	Chicago Marathon	Chicago, US	Hyponatremia
GBR	Don Scott	48	26 September 1999	Robin Hood Marathon	Nottingham, UK	Heart attack
USA	Danny Towns	45	22 October 2000	Chicago Marathon	Chicago, US	Heart attack
USA	Luke Roach	22	7 October 2001	Chicago Marathon	Chicago, US	Heat stroke
USA	Laura M. Clancy	29	20 October 2001	Baltimore Marathon	Baltimore, US	Brain aneurysm
ECU	Cynthia Lucero	28	15 April 2002	Boston Marathon	Boston, US	Hyponatremia
GER	Malte O.	19	23 April 2002	Marathon Hamburg	Hamburg, Germany	Collapsed shortly before the finish line
USA	Hilary Bellamy	35	27 October 2002	Marine Corps Marathon	Washington, D.C., US	Hyponatremia
GBR	Craig Johanson	28	14 September 2003	Robin Hood Marathon	Nottingham, UK	Cardiac arrhythmia
USA	Rachael Townsend	29	12 October 2003	Chicago Marathon	Chicago, US	Mitral valve prolapse
FRA	Serge Vigot		2005	Marrakech Marathon	Marrakesh, Morocco	Heart attack
USA	James Leone	60	19 March 2006	Los Angeles Marathon	Los Angeles, US	Heart attack
USA	Raul Reyna	53	19 March 2006	Los Angeles Marathon	Los Angeles, US	Heart attack
USA	William Goggins	43	30 July 2006	San Francisco Marathon	San Francisco, US	Hypertrophic cardiomyopathy
USA	George Spears, Sr.	49	1 October 2006	Twin Cities Marathon	Minneapolis, US	Heart attack
USA	Earl Seyford	56	29 October 2006	Marine Corps Marathon	Washington, D.C., US	Heart attack
BRA	Raimundo Rodrigues Sobrinho	57	27 November 2006	Curitiba Marathon	Curitiba, Brazil	Heart attack; "became ill at kilometer 39"; previously known hypertension
USA	Marc Witkes	40	10 December 2006	Tucson Marathon	Tucson, US	Congenital heart abnormalities (bicuspid aortic valve; blood vessels supplying heart muscle were abnormal)
GBR	David Rogers	22	22 April 2007	London Marathon	London, UK	Hyponatremia
USA	Chad Schieber	35	7 October 2007	Chicago Marathon	Chicago, US	Mitral valve prolapse
USA	Ryan Shay	28	3 November 2007	USA Marathon Championships	New York City, US	Cardiac arrhythmia; previously known enlarged heart
USA	Adam Nickel	27	2 March 2008	Little Rock Marathon	Little Rock, US	Coronary artery abnormality; electrolyte imbalance
BRA	Carlos Jose Gomes	58	2 November 2008	New York City Marathon	New York City, US	Heart attack
USA	Joseph Marotta	66	2 November 2008	New York City Marathon	New York City, US	Heart attack
USA	Fred Costa	41	2 November 2008	New York City Marathon	New York City, US	Heart attack
USA	Erin Lahr	29	14 December 2008	Dallas Marathon	Dallas, US	Cardiac arrhythmia
IRE	Colin Dunne	27	1 March 2009	Barcelona Marathon	Barcelona, Spain	Heart attack
USA	Peter Curtin	23	10 October 2009	Baltimore Marathon	Baltimore, US	Undetermined, possible heat stroke; body temperature 107 °F (42 °C)
USA	Jon Fenlon	26	19 October 2009	Detroit Free Press Marathon	Detroit, US	Cardiac dysrhythmia
USA	Daniel Langdon	36	19 October 2009	Detroit Free Press Marathon	Detroit, US	Cardiac dysrhythmia
USA	Rick Brown	65	19 October 2009	Detroit Free Press Marathon	Detroit, US	Heart disease, cardiac arrest
NED	Tom Van Der Gucht	55	21 March 2010	Rome marathon	Rome, Italy	Heart attack
SWE	unnamed	60	23 May 2011	Riga Marathon	Riga, Latvia	"found to have a blood clot in his brain"
USA	William Caviness	35	9 October 2011	Chicago Marathon	Chicago, US	Heart attack
USA	Ulysses Thomas	58	5 November 2011	Savannah Marathon	Savannah, US	
USA	Jorge Fernandez	32	Nov 13, 2011	Rock 'n' Roll San Antonio Marathon	San Antonio, US	Cardiac arrest
GBR	Ged Clarke	39	3 April 2012	Reading Half Marathon	Reading, UK	Heart attack (caused by a pre-existing heart condition)
GBR	Claire Squires	30	22 April 2012	London Marathon	London, UK	Heart attack, DMAA supplement
LAT	unnamed		20 May 2012	Riga Marathon	Riga, Latvia	
ESP	Xavier Jiménez	45	17 March 2013	Barcelona Marathon	Barcelona, Spain	Heart attack
GBR	Sam Harper Brighouse	23	14 April 2013	Brighton Marathon	Brighton, UK	Ischemic colitis
USA	R. Jacob Zeman	35	9 November 2013	Rock 'n' Roll Marathon	Savannah, US	"Unsuspected heart condition"
FRA	Pascal Galibert	51	26 November 2013	La Rochelle Marathon	La Rochelle, France	Severe chest pain; Cardiac arrest
SWE	unnamed	27	2014	Göteborgsvarvet	Gothenburg, Sweden	Collapse, "cardiac event"
GBR	Robert Berry	42	13 April 2014	London Marathon	London, UK	Heat stroke
GBR	James Phillips	27	21 September 2014	Run Reigate marathon	Reigate, UK	Cardiac arrest
LAT	unnamed	25	17 May 2015	Riga Marathon	Riga, Latvia	"unwell; medics tried for a long time to resuscitate him, without success"
AUT	unnamed	35	13 September 2015	Wachau Marathon	Wachau, Austria	Cardiac arrest
AUT	unnamed	44	13 September 2015	Wachau Marathon	Wachau, Austria	Cardiac arrest
FRA	unnamed	35	8 November 2015	Nice-Cannes marathon	Nice, France	Heart attack
ESP	Daniel Juárez	26	28 November 2015	Benidorm Marathon	Benidorm, Spain	Heart attack
JPN	unnamed	67	30 November 2015	Koedo Kawagoe Marathon	Hiratsuka, Japan	"Fatal arrhythmia"
SWE	unnamed	50	2016		Gothenburg, Sweden	Collapse, "cardiac event"
NED	Patrick Ahandris	44	1 February 2016	International Marathon of Marrakech	Marrakesh, Morocco	Heart attack
PHI	Manases Alfon Jr.	38	7 February 2016	Condura Skyway Marathon	Filinvest City, Philippines	
PHI	Arnold Lubang	40	7 February 2016	Condura Skyway Marathon	Filinvest City, Philippines	Cardiac arrest
GBR	Mike Freeman	55	28 February 2016	Vodafone Malta Marathon	Sliema, Malta	"Natural causes"
GBR	David Seath	31	24 April 2016	London Marathon	London, UK	Cardiac arrest
ESP	Francisco Amat	57	April 2016	Ojos Negros marathon	Ojos Negros, Spain	
NED	Rob Bremer	50	26 November 2017	Curacao KLM Marathon	Willemstad, Curacao	Cardiac arrest
GBR	Matt Campbell	29	22 April 2018	London Marathon	London, UK	Cardiac arrest
GBR	Juan Camilo Arboleda Alzate	38	16 September 2018	Maratón Medellin	Medellín, Colombia	Heart attack
CHI	Claudio Agurto Spencer	51	7 April 2019	Santiago Marathon	Santiago, Chile	Aortic dissection
USA	Taylor Ceepo	22	19 May 2019	Cleveland Marathon	Cleveland, US	Cardiac
CAN	Steve Trickett	35	26 May 2019	Ottawa Marathon	Ottawa, Canada	Heart attack
JPN	Atsushi Ono	58	September 8, 2019	Maybank Bali Marathon	Gianyar, Indonesia	Cardiac arrest
ESP	Jesús Millán García	30	20 October 2019	Carrera Urbana de Málaga	Capuchinos, Spain	Cardiac arrest (previously "suffered from a structural aortic disorder", "coronary artery disease")
USA	Harry Vroulis	74	19 January 2020	Houston Marathon	Houston, US	Heart attack
ESP	unnamed	30	1 March 2020	Platja d'Aro Greenways Marathon	Platja d'Aro, Spain	Cardiac arrest
USA	Gregory McSween	41	9 November 2021	Marine Corps Marathon	Washington, D.C., US	
FRA	unnamed	50s	October 5, 2021	Marathon des Sables	Sahara, southern Morocco	Heart attack; cardiac arrest
GBR	unnamed	36	3 October 2022	London Marathon	London, UK	Died after collapsing
USA	Trisha Paddock	46	20 March 2022	Los Angeles Marathon	Los Angeles, US	Heart attack
USA	David Reichman	32	May 21, 2022	Brooklyn Half Marathon	New York City, US	
FRA	Bruno Meunier	41	5 June 2022	Marathon de la Liberté	Caen, France	Heart attack
GBR	unnamed	36	3 Oct 2022	London Marathon	London, UK	
FRA	unnamed woman	27	12 November 2022	Cognac Marathon	Jarnac, France	Heart attack; cardiac arrest
NOR	Helge Arnfinn Holmen	58	14 November 2022	Málaga half marathon	Malaga, Spain	Cardiac arrest
USA	Pierre Lipton	26	Feb 4, 2023	Mesa Marathon	Mesa, US	Cardiac arrest; "sudden electrolyte shift", possibly worsened by minor, undetected heart muscle inflammation
JPN	unnamed	20s	26 February 2023	14th Iwaki Sunshine Marathon	Iwaki City, Fukushima Prefecture, Japan	Cardiac arrest
ESP	Fernando Ayala Collado	21	12 March 2023	Elche Half Marathon	Alicante, Spain	Cardiac ("Unable to resuscitate for 40 minutes")
BRA	Bruno Teixeira	26	5 June 2023	Maratona de Pablo Marçal	São Paulo, Brazil	Cardiac arrest
USA	Sam Norton	26	27 August 2023	Santa Rosa Marathon	Santa Rosa, US	Rhabdomyolysis
JPN	unnamed	60s	10 September 2023	Takubokunosato Fureai Marathon	Morioka, Japan	
BRA	Alexandre de Luca Cabreira	50	25 September 2023	Criciúma Marathon	Criciúma, Brazil	Heart attack
GER	Felix T.	24	8 October 2023	Munich Marathon	Munich, Germany	
HKG	Zhang Zhichong	30	21 January 2024	Standard Chartered Marathon	Hong Kong	Cardiac issue
JPN	unnamed	69	3 March 2024	Tokyo Marathon	Sumida, Japan	"fell, hit his head hard, and lost consciousness"
BEL	unnamed	30	10 April 2024	Paris Marathon	Paris, France	Cardiac arrest
GBR	Samuel Kettle	26	21 April 2024	Shakespeare Marathon	Stratford, UK	Cardiac arrest
GER	unnamed	25	29 April 2024	Marathon Hamburg	Hamburg, Germany	Collapsed shortly before the finish at the 40.5-kilometer mark
USA	Joey Fecci	26	27 April 2024	Nashville Marathon	Nashville, US	"Natural causes"
POR	Marco Gomes	42	28 April 2024	Maratona da Europa	Aveiro, Portugal	Cardiorespiratory arrest
GBR	Mike Harper	26	19 May 2024	Bristol Half Marathon	Bristol, UK	Cardiac arrest
SWE	unnamed	21	23 May 2024	Göteborgsvarvet	Göteborg, Sweden	Cardiac arrest
GBR	unnamed	40	27 May 2024	Great Manchester Run	Manchester, UK	
GBR	Brad Clark	25	9 June 2024	Southend Half Marathon	Shoeburyness, UK	Collapsed; pronounced dead at the scene
GBR	Sam Wealleans	29	8 September 2024	Great North Run	Newcastle, UK	
Zambia	James CHISANGA	29	7 September 2024	Absa Marathon	lusaka, Zambia	
USA	Caleb Graves	35	9 September 2024	Disneyland's Halloween Half Marathon	Anaheim, US	Cardiac arrest
USA	Blake Joseph Groulx	27	September 10, 2024	City of Lakes Half Marathon	Minneapolis, US	Cardiac arrest ("no pulse")
USA	unnamed	57	21 October 2024	Detroit Free Press Marathon	Windsor, Ontario	"major medical emergency"
FRA	Georges	72	3 November 2024	La Baule Marathon	La Baule-Escoublac, France	Heart attack; "collapsed about 50 meters from the finish line, after more than 42 km"
FRA	Roland Claverie	48	1 December 2024	Turin Marathon	Turin, Italy	"died in the final kilometer"; "suffered a fatal collapse"; Cardiac arrest
IRL	Aaron Johnston	24	5 February 2025	Winter Warmer Run Half Marathon	Glasgow, UK	
POR	Miguel Santos	29	11 February 2025	Cascais Half Marathon	Lisbon, Portugal	Cardiorespiratory arrest
USA	Camryn Morris	19	5 April 2025	Corvallis Half Marathon	Corvallis, US	Cardiac arrest
ESP	unnamed	38	6 April 2025	Madrid half marathon	Madrid, Spain	Cardiac arrest
VIE	unnamed	53	6 April 2025	Vietnam Ultra Marathon	Quang Dien District, Vietnam	Cardiac arrest
USA	Mateo Cruz	23	27 April 2025	Eugene Half-Marathon	Eugene, US	Cardiac
GBR	Jon Devereux	28	11 May 2025	South West half marathon	Bristol, UK	Heart attack
USA	Charles Rogers	31	17 May 2025	Brooklyn Half Marathon	New York City, US	Cardiac arrest
EST	Roland Liinar	25	18 May 2025	Riga Marathon	Riga, Latvia	Cardiac arrest
FRA	Julien Autissier	33	25 January 2026	Miami Marathon	Miami, US	Cardiac arrest
USA	Treyton Lara	24	4 October 2026	Portland Marathon	Portland, Oregon	Heart failure
USA	Rachel Apa	24	1 November 2026	New York City Marathon	New York City, US	Rhabdomyolysis

== Non-health-related marathon fatalities ==
Country	Event	Deaths	Date
Sri Lanka	Weliveriya bombing	15	5 April 2008
USA	Boston Marathon bombing	3	15 April 2013
China	Gansu ultramarathon disaster	21	22 May 2021

== See also ==
- Phidippides cardiomyopathy
- Lists of sportspeople who died during their careers
