= List of Hockenheimring fatalities =

Fatal accidents to competitors at the Hockenheimring circuit during the German Grand Prix and other national and international motor-sport events. The circuit was first used in 1932 using the Hockenheim "triangle course". It was rebuilt in 1938 into the "Kurpfalzring" (oval course) with the addition of the "Motodrom" stadium section in 1964. Metal Armco barriers and chicanes were added in 1970 and a further chicane added in 1980 at the site of the Ost-Curve. The Hockenheimring was shortened to a 4.574 km (2.842 mi) Grand Prix circuit used from 2002 onwards.

== List of fatal accidents involving competitors ==
No	Competitor	Date	Place	Series	Race	Type
1	(Germany) Leo Burkhardt	8 May 1948		1948 Maipokalrennen	Practice	500cc BMW
2	(Germany) Niemann	9 May 1948			1948 Maipokalrennen	500cc BMW
3	(Germany) Willy Beste	14 May 1951		1951 Germany F3 Championship	1951 Maipokal Rennen	Eigenbau
4	(Germany) Gotthilf Gehring	10 May 1953			1953 Maipokalrennen	250cc Moto Guzzi
5	(Germany) Hugo Steiner	Dec 1953	Friedhofskurve	1953 Speed Record Attempt		Goliath Rekordwagen
6	(Germany) Heinz Schreiber	23 June 1963	Ost-Kurve	1963 Deutsche Rundstrecken Meisterschaft	1963 Internationales Rundstreckenrennen	BMW 700
7	(United Kingdom) Jim Clark	7 April 1968		1968 European F2 Championship	1968 Deutschland Trophäe	Lotus 48 F2
8	(Germany) Helmuth Baumann	3 June 1968	Ost-Kurve	1968 Deutsche Straßenmeisterschaft	1968 Hessenpreis	500cc BMW Sidecar
9	(Germany) Alex Ludwig	3 June 1968	Ost-Kurve	1968 Deutsche Straßenmeisterschaft	1968 Hessenpreis	500cc BMW Sidecar
10	(Germany) Rolf Schmid	13 Oct 1968	Stadium Section	1968 FIM World Sidecar Championship		500cc BMW Sidecar
11	(Germany) Rolf Hanselmann	18 Oct 1969	Ost-Kurve	1969 Deutsche Rundstrecken Meisterschaft	1969 300 Meilen von Hockenheim	Porsche 911
12	(New Zealand) Bert Hawthorne	14 April 1972	Jim Clark Kurve	1972 European F2 Championship	1972 Deutschland Trophäe	Leda-Tui AM29
13	(Germany) Franz Abraham	16 April 1977	Elf-Kurve	1977 Jim Clark Memorial Race	Support Race	Porsche 911 Carrera RSR 3.0
14	(Austria) Markus Höttinger	13 April 1980	Nord-Kurve	1980 European F2 Championship	1980 Deutschland Trophäe	Maurer MM80 - BMW
15	(Germany) Rene Kamlot	4 May 1980	Ost-Kurve		1980 Maipokalrennen	Yamaha TZ 250
16	(Germany) Wolf Dieter Doubrava	23 June 1985		1985 100 Meilen von Hockenheim	Practice	Karringer FV
17	(Germany) Erwin Loichinger	1986	Stadium Section	1986 Seriensport Challenge	1986 International 1000 km	
18	(United Kingdom) Tony Boden	9 Aug 1986	Südkurve	Funny Car exhibition	1986 NitrOlympX	"Hit Man" - Dodge Omni Funny Car
19	(Switzerland) Dieter Waelti	July 1987		1987 Ford Pokal	Practice	Ford
20	(Venezuela) Iván Palazzese	28 May 1989	Sachs Corner	1989 FIM World Motor-Cycle Championship	1989 German motorcycle Grand Prix	250cc Aprilia
21	(United Kingdom) Simon Prior	12 June 1994	Ost-Curve/Senna Chicane	1994 FIM World Sidecar Championship	1994 German motorcycle Grand Prix	250cc Aprilia
22	(Germany) Holger Turni	7 April 2007		2007 1000 km Endurance Challenge	Practice	Buell XB12 STT
23	(Germany) Torsten Grigo	23 Aug 2008	Nord-Kurve	2008 DMSB Pokal	Pro Thunder Division 1	Ducati 848
24	(United Kingdom) Steve Norbury	7 Sep 2008	Stadium Section	2008 German F1 Sidecar Championship		600cc Shelbourne - Yamaha

== List of fatal accidents during unofficial testing ==
No	Competitor	Date	Place	Series	Event	Machine
1	(Germany) Eitel	20 July 1955	Ost-Curve	Daimler-Benz Versuchsabteilung	Private Test Session	Mercedes-Benz 300SL
2	(Germany) Karl Remmert	20 July 1956			Private Test Session	500cc BMW Sidecar
3	(France) Patrick Depailler	1 Aug 1980	Ost-Curve	1980 FIA Formula 1 World Championship	Formula 1 Test Session	Alfa Romeo 179B

== List of fatal accidents involving race officials ==
No	Official	Date	Place	Series	Race	Role
1	(Germany) Petrick Rotz	10 May 1953			1953 Maipokalrennen	Police Officer
2	(Germany) Erich Hoffmann	31 Oct 1981	Pit-Lane	Formula Ford		Team Manager

== See also ==
- List of Nürburgring fatalities
