= List of Watkins Glen International fatalities =

Fatal accidents to competitors at the Watkins Glen International Circuit during the United States Grand Prix and other national and international motorsport events on a 10.6 km (6.6 mi) road circuit (1948–1952), an amended 7.4 km (4.6 mi) circuit (1953–1956) and the 3.78 km (2.35 mi) Grand Prix circuit from 1957 onwards.

== List of fatal accidents involving competitors ==
No	Competitor	Date	Place	Series	Race	Type
1	(United States) Sam Collier	23 Sep 1950			1950 Watkins Glen Grand Prix	Ferrari 166 S
2	(United States) Tommy Seagraves	13 Aug 1960		American Motorcyclist Association		Harley-Davidson KRTT
3	(United States) Bud Faust	22 Sep 1962		1962 SCCA National		Lotus-Buick
4	(United States) Harold Woods	22 Aug 1965	Outer Loop	1965 SCCA National	1965 The Glen 500 Km	Daimler SP250
5	(United States) Edward Mathias	17 Oct 1965		1965 SCCA National		Porsche - Elvra
6	(United States) Martin Krinner	20 Aug 1967		1967 SCCA National	1967 The Glen 500 Km	Shelby Mustang
7	(France) François Cevert	06 Oct 1973	Turn #4	1973 FIA Formula 1 World Championship	1973 United States Grand Prix	Tyrrell-Cosworth 006
8	(Austria) Helmut Koinigg	06 Oct 1974	Turn #7	1974 FIA Formula 1 World Championship	1974 United States Grand Prix	Surtees TS16-Cosworth
9	(United States) Mark Freed	29 Aug 1976	Turn #10	1976 SCCA Glen Region	Closed circuit event	Bugeye Sprite
10	(United States) J. D. McDuffie	11 Aug 1991	Turn #5	1991 NASCAR Winston Cup	1991 Bud at the Glen	Pontiac
11	(United States) Ken Buchel	09 Jul 2011	The Chute	2011 SCCA Series	The Glen Double Nationals	Honda CR-X
12	(United States) Steven Cullman	07 Jun 2024		2024 Historic Sportscar Racing	Historic Sportscar Racing Classic	Mustang Boss 302

== List of fatal accidents involving spectators ==
No	Name	Date	Place	Series	Race	Role
1	(United States) Frank Fazzari	20 Sep 1952	Franklin Street		1952 Watkins Glen Grand Prix	Spectator

== See also ==
- List of Daytona International Speedway fatalities
- List of Indianapolis Motor Speedway fatalities
