= Trans-oriental Rally =

2008 motor rally

The Trans-oriental Rally was a motor rally which started in St. Petersburg on June 12, 2008 and ended next to the Great Wall of China near Beijing on June 28, 2008.

== Overview ==
It was an alternative to the Lisboa 2008 Dakar Rally which was cancelled due to fears of terrorism. Among the drivers on the race was François Delecour, two-time winner of the Monte Carlo Rally.

There were 16 legs planned:

Stage	Date	From	To
1	June 12	(Russia) St. Petersburg	(Russia) Rogatchevo
2	June 13	(Russia) Rogatchevo	(Russia) Petrovsky
3	June 14	(Russia) Petrovsky	(Russia) Yelabuga
4	June 15	(Russia) Yelabuga	(Russia) Mrakovo
5	June 16	(Russia) Mrakovo	Bogotse
6	June 17	Bogotse	(Kazakhstan) Arkalyk
7	June 18	(Kazakhstan) Arkalyk	(Kazakhstan) Botakara (via Astana)
8	June 19	(Kazakhstan) Botakara	(Kazakhstan) Ayaguz
9	June 20	(Kazakhstan) Ayaguz	(China) Karamay
10	June 21	(China) Karamay	(China) Turpan
Rest day
11	June 23	(China) Turpan	(China) Hami
12	June 24	(China) Hami	(China) Quinguan
13	June 25	(China) Quinguan	(China) Alxa Youqi
14	June 26	(China) Alxa Youqi	(China) Bayanhot
15	June 27	(China) Bayanhot	(China) Hohhot
16	June 28	(China) Hohhot	(China) Beijing

== Fatalities ==
To date there have been two fatalities on the race:

- Chinese driver Xu Lang, June 17 (from injuries sustained a day earlier)
- French motorcyclist Philippe Tonin, June 17

The latter fatality led the Russian Kamaz team to withdraw.
