= List of multisport and triathlon fatalities =

This is a sortable list of multisport and triathlon fatalities.

It contains information on athletes, spectators or staff who died as a result of participating in a multisport event or triathlon.

Country of Race	Name	Age	Date of Race	Name of Multisport or Triathlon Race	Location	Cause/Other Notes	Discipline
US	Unknown Male	51	09/12/2026	Ironman 70.3 Wisconsin	Madison, WI	Health event while swimming (The family wishes this to remain private)	Swim
France	Unknown Male	42	06/28/2026	Ironman 70.3 Nice	Nice, France	Race canceled due to heat. Some athletes proceeded on course anyway. Athlete cycling hit by a motorcycle after athlete crossed center.	Bike
US	Larry Winans	61	6/14/2026	Ironman 70.3 Happy Valley	Pennsylvania	Cardiac arrest	Swim
US	Mara Flávia Araujo	38	4/18/2026	Ironman 140.6 Texas	Texas	Drowning	Swim
South Africa	Michael Clapperton	58	11/16/2025	Ironman 70.3 Mossel Bay	Western Cape	TBD	Swim
South Africa	Martin Pretorius	29	11/16/2025	Ironman 70.3 Mossel Bay	Western Cape	TBD	Swim
Turkey	John Brett	52	11/02/2025	Ironman 70.3 Turkey	Belek	Cardiac arrest	Swim
US	David Mattingly	68	10/5/2025	Ironman 70.3 Waco	Texas	TBD	Swim
Mexico	T.F. Eusebio	58	9/21/2025	Ironman 70.3 Cozumel	Quintana Roo	TBD	Swim
Canada	Sean Cleary	52	8/10/2025	Barrie Triathlon	Ontario	TBD	Swim
Austria	Alexander Schawalder	62	7/20/2025	Trumer Triathlon	Salzburg	Cardiac arrest	Swim
US	Hannah Merlucci	37	7/19/2025	Fayson Lakes Triathlon	New Jersey	TBD	Swim
US	Peter Sultan	54	7/13/2025	Jamesport Triathlon	New York	TBD	Run
UK	Sam Buchan	31	7/13/2025	Ironman 70.3 Swansea	Wales	Exertional heat stroke causing cardiac arrest.	Swim
US	Eric Wolfe	43	7/12/2025	Ironman 70.3 Muncie	Indiana	Myocardial infarction, due to ischemic heart disease	Swim
US	Ken Freed	64	6/29/2025	Manitou Triathlon	Minnesota	TBD	Swim
France	Unknown male	54	6/14/2025	T24 Ile de Ré	Charente-Maritime	TBD	Swim
France	Unknown male	47	6/7/2025	Alpsman Xtrem Triathlon	Haute-Savoie	Collision with a truck	Bike
South Africa	Unknown	TBD	6/1/2025	Ironman 70.3 Durban	KwaZulu-Natal	TBD	Swim
South Africa	Unknown	TBD	3/29/2025	5150 Nelson Mandela Bay	Eastern Cape	TBD	Swim
Brazil	Aninha Zuleica Xavier	39	3/16/2025	Beira-Mar de Fortaleza	Ceará	TBD	Swim
Australia	Unknown	60s	2/8/2025	Coles Bay Triathlon	Tasmania	TBD	Swim
US	Unknown	46	12/08/2024	Ironman 70.3 Indian Wells	California	TBD	Swim
Australia	Shekhar Dhanvijay	48	12/1/2024	Ironman Western Australia	Western Australia	TBD	Swim
Croatia	Unknown	50	10/20/24	Ironman 70.3 Porec	Porec	TBD	Swim
Spain	Mark Stokes	57	10/17/24	World Triathlon Championship	Torremolinos	TBD	Run
Spain	Roger Mas Colomer	79	10/17/24	World Triathlon Championship	Torremolinos	TBD	Swim
Spain	Elena Smirnova	41	10/6/2024	Ironman 70.3 Calella-Barcelona	Calella	TBD	Swim
Taiwan	Mr. Liu	65	9/22/2024	Force 2024 Hualien Triathlon	Hualien County	Drowning	Swim
UK	John Sanders	61	8/24/2024	Triathlon England National Club Relays	Nottinghamshire	TBD	After
US	Richard DiStefano	65	8/18/2024	Cazenovia	New York	TBD	Swim
US	Lazar Đukić	28	8/8/2024	Crossfit Games	Texas	TBD	Swim
US	UNK	TBD	7/21/2024	Ironman 70.3 Oregon	Oregon	TBD	Swim
US	UNK	TBD	7/20/2024	Nantucket Triathlon	Massachusetts	Pulled from the 600 yard swim	Swim
Philippines	UNK	TBD	7/14/2024	Ironman 5150 Bohol	Bohol	TBD	Swim
Korea	Mr. Kim	62	6/2/2024	Challenge Gunsan-Saemangeum	Gunsan	Police believe heart attack	Swim
US	Amy Rogers Wolfenden	50	5/19/2024	XTERRA North American Championship	Alabama	TBD	Swim
US	Paul Lachiewicz	73	5/5/2024	White Lake	North Carolina	Unresponsive 400 yards in	Swim
US	Jean-Francois Alain	49	4/7/2024	Ironman 70.3 Galveston	Texas	Requiring medical attention 950m in	Swim
Colombia	Jorge Zambrano	34	3/17/2024	Xseries Tri Fest Sai	San Andres	Heart attack	Swim
US	Rick Betton	71	3/10/2024	Azalea Sprint	North Carolina	Collapsed after 300 yard seeded pool swim	Swim
US	Joyce Allen	62	12/10/2023	Key West Triathlon	Florida	Vehicle collision	Bike
Australia	UNK	53	11/5/2023	Noosa	Queensland	found unresponsive, was pulled from the water, and died on the scene	Swim
New Zealand	Rachel James	50	11/4/2023	Iron Maori	Napier	Sudden death	Swim
India	Kamakhya Siddharth	26	10/8/2023	Ironman 70.3 Goa	Goa	suffered multiple organ failure	Run
US	Tim Shelton	53	10/7/2023	Ironman 70.3 Memphis	Tennessee	cardiac arrest	Swim
Malaysia	Muhaini Mahmud	44	10/7/2023	Ironman 70.3 Langkawi	Langkawi	TBD	Swim
Spain	Unnamed	UNK	10/1/2023	Ironman 70.3 Barcelona	Barcelona	UNK	Bike
UK	John Griffin	62	9/20/2023	Oxfordshire Tri Series	Oxfordshire	Single cyclist bike accident	Bike
US	Dax Bakken	51	9/10/2023	Ironman 140.6 Wisconsin	Wisconsin	TBD	Bike
US	Scott Morrow	58	8/26/2023	Tri the Wildwoods	New Jersey	Difficulty in the water	Swim
Finland	Cheryl Eng Lucero	66	8/26/2023	Ironman 70.3 World Championship	Lahti	Difficulty in the water	Swim
Ireland	Ivan Chittenden	64	8/20/2023	Ironman 70.3 Ireland Cork	Youghal	Acute cardiorespiratory failure due to drowning	Swim
Ireland	Brendan Wall	44	8/20/2023	Ironman 70.3 Ireland Cork	Youghal	Acute cardiorespiratory failure due to drowning	Swim
Estonia	Unnamed	UNK	8/6/2023	Ironman 70.3 Tallinn	Tallinn	Found unresponsive in Lake Harku	Swim
France	Sarah Fagan	48	7/28/2023	Alpe D'Huez Triathlon	Allemon	Found unresponsive in Lake Verney	Swim
Canada	Alex Gress	50	7/9/2023	Ironman 70.3 Muskoka	Huntsville, Ontario		Swim
US	Jordan Whitney Taylor	34	6/25/2023	San Diego International Triathlon (SDIT)	San Diego, CA	Found unresponsive during swim	Swim
Germany	Unnamed	70	6/4/2023	Ironman 140.6 Hamburg	Hamburg	Motorcycle rider died in collision with athlete.	Bike
UK	Andrew Ireland	61	5/28/2023	Swansea Triathlon	Swansea, Wales	Athlete required medical attention during swim	Swim
US	Marshall Martin	58	5/21/2023	Ironman 70.3 Chattanooga	Chattanooga, TN	Bicycle accident, head, rib and other injuries. Taken to hospital, died on May 29, 2023	Bike
France	Unnamed	UNK	5/21/2023	Ironman 70.3 Aix-en-Provence	Aix-en-Provence, Bouches-du-Rhône	During the beginning of the swim	Swim
Australia	Peter Tanham	63	4/29/2023	Busselton 100	Floreat, Perth	Required medical attention on bike, taken to hospital and later pronounced dead	Bike
Philippines	Jerry Kasim	49	3/26/2023	Ironman 70.3 Davao	Davao City, Davao Region	Heart attack	Swim
Israel	Michael Ginor	59	11/25/2022	Ironman Israel Middle East Championship	Tiberias, Northern District	Suffered heart attack and found in distress during swim, taken to local hospital and later pronounced dead	Swim
US	Allen Simmons	75	11/5/2022	Ironman Florida	Panama City Beach, Florida	Required medical attention after finishing, taken to local hospital and later pronounced dead	Later
Portugal	Derrick Tee Hui Sheng	36	10/15/2022	Ironman 70.3 Portugal	Cascais, Libson	Required medical attention during swim, died in ambulance on the way to hospital	Swim
Brazil	Fernando Jorge Mendes Ahid	58	10/9/2022	Maranhense Triathlon Federation	Espigão Costeiro, São Luís	Had a sudden illness during the swimming test, taken to local hospital and later pronounced dead	Swim
US	Evelyn Lopez	44	9/25/2022	Ironman 70.3 Augusta	Augusta, Georgia	Became unresponsive during swim, taken to local hospital and later pronounced dead	Swim
US	Eduardo Munoz	61	9/11/2022	Ironman 70.3 Santa Cruz	Santa Cruz, California	Suffered heart attack and found unresponsive during swim, taken to local hospital and later pronounced dead	Swim
Germany	Rolf Felber	67	8/28/2022	Ironman 70.3 Duisburg	Duisburg, Rhineland	Found unresponsive shortly after beginning swim, taken to local hospital and pronounced dead upon arrival	Swim
US	Kevin Holt	64	8/6/2022	Ironman 70.3 Boulder	Boulder, Colorado	Hit head during swim, taken to local hospital and later pronounced dead due to lack of oxygen	Swim
Canada	Candace Nayman	27	7/28/2022	Toronto Triathlon Festival	Toronto, Ontario	Collapsed during swim, taken to local hospital and pronounced dead several days later, donated organs	Swim
Venezuela	Susana Lozada Forero	32	7/16/2022	El Desafío	Barinas, Barinas	Fainted during run, taken to local hospital and later pronounced dead due to acute dehydration and hypoglycemia	Run
US	William R. Harms	51	6/26/2022	Pleasant Prairie Triathlon	Pleasant Prairie, Wisconsin	Found unresponsive by racer during swim, taken to local hospital and later pronounced dead	Swim
US	Michael P. Bleacher	70	6/12/2022	Escape the Cape	Lower Township, New Jersey	Found "in-distress" during swim, taken to local hospital and later pronounced dead	Swim
UK	Andy Hey	54	6/12/2022	Ironman 70.3 Staffordshire	Staffordshire, England	Needed medical attention during swim, taken to local hospital and later pronounced dead	Swim
US	Curtis J. Wilson	71	5/16/2022	Bear Triathlon	Newark, Delaware	Needed CPR performed during swim, taken to local hospital and later pronounced dead	Swim
UK	Andrew Phillips	56	5/28/2022	Blenheim Palace Triathlon	Oxford	Hypoxic ischaemic encephalopathy and cardiac arrest	Swim
Portugal	Unnamed	UNK	5/7/2022	Challenge Lisboa	Lisboa		Swim
Spain	Unnamed	41	5/7/2022	Ironman 70.3 Alcudia	Mallorca		Swim
US	Daniel Winkler	46	4/3/2022	Ironman 70.3 Texas	Texas		Swim
Chile	Renato Bastías	38	1/9/2022	Ironman 70.3 Pucon	Pucon	Heart Attack	Swim
US	Michael Wayne Guenzler	42	10/10/2021	Ponte Vedra Beach Triathlon	Florida	Major Medical Event/Drowning	Swim
Mexico	Leticia Rico González	51	9/26/2021	Ironman 70.3 Cozumel	Cozumel, Quintana Roo	Pulled from the water during a swimming test, take to a local hospital and later pronounced dead	
US	George Hall	UNK	9/26/2021	Ironman 70.3 Augusta	Georgia	CPR was administered on the rescue boat while still in the water	Swim
UK	Unnamed	UNK	9/11/2021	Blenheim Palace Triathlon	Oxfordshire, England		TBA
Canada	Unnamed	47	8/1/2021	Ironman 70.3 Calgary	Alberta	Drowning	Swim
Australia	Dave Hayes	UNK	6/7/2021	Ironman 70.3 Cairns	Queensland		Swim
US	Gary Martinez	51	5/1/2021	Ironman 70.3 St. George	Utah	Massive Cardiac Event	Swim
Brazil	Paulo Pereira	40-44	11/24/2019	Ironman Cozumel	Cozumel	Heart Attack	Swim
Spain	Carl Cavanagh	45	10/19/2019	Challenge Peguera	Majorca	Drowning	Swim
Korea	Unnamed	35	10/1/2019	Unknown	Seoul	Drowning	Swim
US	Stephen Zamucen	69	9/14/2019	Nautica Malibu Triathlon	California	Sudden Cardiac Event	Later
France	Richard Glinski	67	9/12/2019	Ironman 70.3 World Championship	Nice	Drowning	Swim
US	Greg Misbach	72	9/8/2019	Rock the Bay San Diego Triathlon	California	Suffered cardiac arrest during swim	Swim
US	Mark Combs	64	8/24/2019	Lake Tahoe Triathlon	California	He called out for help in the water. Preliminary autopsy suggest coronary artery atherosclerosis	Swim
Australia	Loretto Harvey	50	8/16/2019	Townsville Triathlon	Queensland	Collapsed on run	Run
US	Christopher Zimmer	68	8/4/2019	Naperville Sprint Triathlon	Illinois	Crash	Bike
Philippines	Mario Marfori II	UNK	8/4/2019	Musaman TriDavnor Duathlon	Davao City	Occurred right after first run leg	Run
Portugal	Rafael S.	24	8/1/2019	Amizade Triathlon	Viana do Castelo	Suffered indisposition in the swimming segment, before sinking. He asked for help, but when a safety boat came closer, the body had already sunk.	Swim
US	Kristen J. Oswald	44	7/28/2019	Ironman 70.3 Ohio	Ohio	Struck by tractor-trailer	Bike
Finland	Unnamed man	UNK	6/30/2019	Ironman 70.3 Finland	Lahti	Suspected bout of illness	Swim
US	Quy P. Pham	35	6/30/2019	Robious Landing	Virginia	Drowning	Swim
Canada	Jill Levy Morris	46	6/23/2019	Ironman 70.3 Mont-Tremblant	Mont-Tremblant	Thoracic compression, with several of her internal organs crushed due to being run over by a race support vehicle	Bike
US	Michael McCulloch	61	6/9/2019	Ironman 70.3 Wisconsin	Wisconsin	Drowning	Swim
US	Todd Mahoney	38	6/9/2019	Ironman 70.3 Wisconsin	Wisconsin	Drowning	Swim
US	James Olayos JR	31	6/8/2019	Mighty Montauk	New York		Run
US	Dennis McDaniels	36	6/2/2019	Escape The Cape	New Jersey	Cardiac arrest	Swim
US	Scott Beatse	59	6/2/2019	Lake Mills	Wisconsin	Medical event	Swim
Spain	Unnamed	51	5/18/2019	Ironman 140.6 Barcelona	Barcelona	Unnatural Death	Swim
US	David Schultz	40	5/11/2019	New England Season Opener	Massachusetts	Drowning	Swim
South Africa	Andre Trichardt	48	4/7/2019	Ironman 70.3 South Africa	Cape Town	Drowning	Swim
South Africa	Leon Stanviet	63	4/7/2019	Ironman 70.3 South Africa	Cape Town	Convulsions	Swim
Taiwan	''Chang"	45	3/3/2019	WHISBIH Kaohsiung Aihe International Ironman	Taiwan	Abnormal condition	Swim
Brazil	Ludimilla Barbosa	40	12/2/2018	Local Tournament	Tocantins	Injured by propeller of lifeboat	Swim
Australia	Sam Horan	45	11/4/2018	Noosa	Noosa	Cardiac arrest leading to accident	Bike
US	Mark Wladecki	60	8/11/2018	Gibsonburg	Ohio	Hit by a car after missing stop sign	Bike
US	Scott Michaelis	50	8/4/2018	Ironman 70.3 Boulder	Colorado	Cardiac arrest	Swim
Malaysia	Tharm Wei Wong	39	7/15/2018	Port Dickson	Port Dickson	Drowning	Swim
Malaysia	Jeffrey Yuen	42	7/15/2018	Port Dickson	Port Dickson	Body found day after event; Drowning	Swim
US	Gary Grunwald	61	6/10/2018	USAT Nationals	Michigan	Had chest pains and shortness of breath during run	Run
US	Jim Hix	75	8/11/2018	USAT Age Group Nationals	Ohio	Drowning	Swim
UK	Unnamed	43	6/2/2018	SYWD Sprint	Barry Island	Cardiac arrest	Swim
UK	Sharon Lang	40	4/29/2018	Ironman 70.3 Marbella	Costa del Sol	Cardiac arrest	Swim
US	James Treadwell	75	12/17/2017	American Sprint & Duathlon	Florida	Collapse during swim	Swim
Brazil	Genilson Lima	48	11/26/2017	Ironman 70.3 Fortaleza	Fortaleza	Body recovered a day after the race	Swim
Italy	Jan Willem Koeleman	54	10/28/2017	Forte Village Challenge	Sardinia	Cardiac arrest	Swim
China	Martin So	66	10/21/2017	Hong Kong Life astc Sprint Asian Cup	Hong Kong	Cardiac arrest	Swim
Singapore	Steve Begley	42	9/9/2017	Singapore International	Singapore	Scottish rugby player; Undetected heart condition that led him to drown	Swim
Philippines	Eric Nadal Mediavillo	47	8/6/2017	Ironman 70.3 Philippines	Cebu	Cardiac arrest	Swim
UK	Douglas Waymark	44	8/5/2017	Marble Arch in Central London to Paris' Arc de Triomphe	London	Trouble during swim	Swim
Austria	Unnamed	58	7/2/2017	Ironman 140.6 Austria	Klagenfurt	Suddenly fell off his bike	Bike
Japan	Seito Fujii	50	6/4/2017	Watarase Recreation Area	Tochigi	Drowning	Swim
US	Glen Bruemmer	54	4/22/2017	Ironman 140.6 Texas	Texas	Unnatural Death	Swim
US	Kipp Kinsley	25	8/26/2018	Yankton	South Dakota	Cardiac arrest	Within 24 hours after the race- Kipp won 1st place
US	Vincent Fleck	69	8/7/2016	Smith Point Sprint	New York	Drowning	Swim
US	Michelle Walters	34	8/7/2016	Ironman 140.6 Boulder	Colorado	Died in a collision with a vehicle	Bike
Hungary	Radoslav Okruky	41	7/30/2016	Ironman 70.3 Budapest	Budapest	Collapsed during run	Run
US	Jeffrey James Stevens	56	6/19/2016	Rochester	Minnesota	Drowning	Swim
Australia	Unnamed	47	6/12/2016	Ironman 70.3 Cairns	Queensland	Swim portion, died in hospital later	Later
US	Samuel Fisher	24	6/12/2016	Stamford	Connecticut	Goldman Sachs analyst; Collapsed after finishing	Later
US	Gene Montague	51	5/22/2016	Ironman 70.3 Chattanooga	Tennessee	Cardiac arrest	Swim
US	Michael Wiggins	42	4/30/2016	Pelican Fest	Colorado	Atrial fibrillation	Swim
Germany	Unnamed	UNK	4/17/2016	Challenge Roth	Roth	Drowning	Swim
UK	Paul Gallihawk	34	8/29/2015	Ocean Lake	Kent	Drowning	Swim
US	Brian Godlove	40	8/2/2015	Ironman 140.6 Boulder	Colorado	Died three days after race from dehydration and muscle tissue breakdown.	Later
US	Colin Campbell	27	9/11/2015	Lake Livingston	Texas	Drowning	Swim
Germany	Iain O'May	30	7/5/2015	Ironman 140.6 Frankfurt	Frankfurt	Collapsed at end of race	Later
Australia	Erica Atkins	43	6/14/2015	Ironman 70.3 Cairns	Queensland	Pulled from water, died two days later in hospital	Later
UK	Daniel Cavanagh	40	6/7/2015	Bala Middle Distance Triathlon	North Wales	Heart attack	Bike
US	Wayne Stellar	57	6/6/2015	Kerr Lake	North Carolina	Drowning	Swim
US	Saadin Solah	53	5/16/2015	Sudbury Sprint	Connecticut	Hit by a pickup truck	Bike
Japan	Mototaka Kumagai	72	5/5/2015	Tokunoshima	Tokunoshima	Drowning	Swim
US	Felicia Williams	44	4/25/2015	St. Anthony's Meek and Mighty	Florida	Swimming pool event.	Swim
US	Paul Reynolds	52	3/21/2015	Waikoloa Beach	Hawaii	Medical emergency	Swim
Argentina	Ezequiel Osvaldo Gaspar	21	2/1/2015	Salta	Salta	Drowning	Swim
US	Roger Ackerman	68	10/26/2014	PPD Beach2Battleship	North Carolina	Medical event	Swim
Spain	Carmen Hernandez Paez	48	10/4/2014	Teide Xtreme	Tenerife	Heavy blow to the head	Bike
Spain	Unnamed Male	41	10/4/2014	Garmin Barcelona	Barcelona		Swim
Mexico	Rocío Álvarez de Oyarzabal	48	9/21/2014	Ironman 70.3 Cozumel	Cozumel	Myocardial infarction	Swim
Australia	Peter Farlecas	39	9/13/2014	Ironman 70.3 Sunshine Coast	Mooloolaba	Cardiac arrest	Swim
US	Matthew Alan Cook	37	8/31/2014	Towne Lake	Texas	Drowning	Swim
France	Rob Evans	30	8/24/2014	Ironman 140.6 Nice	Nice	Lost control of bike and struck rock with head	Bike
Russia	Yegor Leontiev	26	6/12/2014	RUS Paratriathlon National Championships	Nizhny Novgorod	Collapsed on run, paramedics attempted lifesaving efforts for 1 hour	Run
US	Donald Bautel	64	4/19/2014	Escape from Fort De Soto	Florida	Drowning	Swim
Australia	Tom Lyons	21	2/2/2014	Hell of the West	Brisbane	Collapsed after end of race	Later
US	Don Green	57	1/12/2014	HITS Naples	Florida	Cardiac arrest	Swim
US	Patrick Hayden	59	10/19/2013	Pumpkinman	Colorado	Drowning	Swim
US	Bob Hartline	62	10/13/2013	Sherwood Island Sprint	Connecticut	Drowning	Swim
US	Christopher Eaton	51	8/18/2013	Luray	Virginia	Walked out of water communicating and passed shortly afterwards. Pulmonary embolism	Other
Spain	Unnamed	UNK	6/13/2013	Challenge Barcelona	Barcelona	Cardiac arrest	Swim
US	James Lawrence	70	7/28/2013	Crabman	Rhode Island	Cardiac arrest	Swim
US	Jeffrey Reed	53	7/14/2013	Catfish Sprint	Pennsylvania	Drowning	Swim
US	Michael Coyle	38	7/13/2013	Musselman	New York	Hit the back of an SUV parked on the side of the road	Bike
US	Lanlin Zhang	31	7/13/2013	Musselman	New York	Fell and lost control of bike	Bike
France	Unnamed	30	6/24/2013	Ironman 140.6 France	Nice	Crashed into wall	Bike
Switzerland	Unnamed	59	6/23/2013	Lake Sempach	Basel	Drowning	Swim
US	David Finley	43	6/22/2013	Ozark Valley	Missouri	Drowning	Swim
US	Michael Giardino	48	6/19/2013	Redondo Beach	California	Collapsed after completing swim	Swim
US	Ross Ehlinger	46	3/3/2013	Escape From Alcatraz	California	Cardiac arrest	Swim
South Africa	Kevin Staessen	29	1/20/2013	Ironman 70.3 South Africa	Cape Town	Cardiac Arrest	Swim
South Africa	Berton Bosman	37	1/20/2013	Ironman 70.3 South Africa	Cape Town	Cardiac Arrest	Swim
USA	Roger Stewart	51	10/21/2012	Kring & Chung Triathlon	California	Drowning	Swim
Hong Kong	Daniel Bagshaw	27	10/14/2012	Hong Kong ITU Asian Cup	Hong Kong	Collapsed right before end on run	Run
US	Gary Grant	46	9/16/2012	Dunkirk	New York	Hit cement barricade	Bike
US	Kendall Webb	80	8/25/2012	Surf Town	California	Collapse shortly after finishing	Later
US	Charles Cribbs Sr.	69	8/19/2012	Buckeye Challenge	Ohio	Drowning	Swim
US	Richard Angelo	53	8/18/2012	USAT Nationals	Vermont	Drowning	Swim
US	Matthew Sell	58	8/12/2012	Emmett's Most Excellent	Idaho	Drowning	Swim
US	Andy Naylor	43	8/11/2012	Ironman 140.6 U.S. Championship	New York	Medical event	Swim
Philippines	Ramon Igaña Jr.	44	8/5/2012	Ironman 70.3 Philippines	Cebu	Road conditions	Bike
US	Stan Bugarcic	34	8/4/2012	Greater Cleveland	Ohio	Drowning	Swim
US	Margaret Pometta	50	7/15/2012	Ironman 70.3 Vineman	California	Cardiac arrest	Swim
US	Jason Kirshner	42	7/14/2012	Dina LaVigna Breath of Life	California	Cardiac arrest	Swim
US	Sean Murphy	44	6/23/2012	Ironman 140.6 Coeur d"Alene	Idaho	Taken to hospital after struggling in water	Later
US	Doug Witmer	42	6/17/2012	High Cliff	Wisconsin	Drowning	Swim
US	Christopher Petty	43	5/19/2012	Turtle Crawl	Georgia	Cardiac arrest	Swim
Chile	Ivan Paez	31	1/15/2012	Ironman 70.3 Pucon	Pucon	Cardiac arrest	Bike
Mexico	Gerardo Sant n Pez	UNK	9/25/2011	Fourth Sports	Xochimilco	Physical condition	Swim
US	Steven J. Linthicum	46	9/18/2011	Dewey Sprint	Delaware	Cardiac arrest	Swim
US	John Park	59	9/11/2011	Nations	D.C.	Collapsed shortly after starting the bike event	Bike
US	Mark Wezca	46	8/28/2011	Ironman 140.6 Louisville	Kentucky	Cardiac arrest	Swim
US	David Aschauer	58	8/28/2011	Cape Elizabeth	Maine	Cardiac arrest	Swim
US	Michael Kudryk	64	8/7/2011	New York City	New York	Drowning	Swim
US	Amy Martich	40	8/7/2011	New York City	New York	Cardiac arrest	Swim
Belgium	Arthur Aghajanyan	26	7/24/2011	Ironman 70.3 Antwerp	Antwerp	crashed while descending on the bike course and suffered trauma to the head	Bike
US	Christopher Ludington	57	6/11/2011	Stowe	Vermont	Drowning	Swim
US	Ron Schafer	53	9/11/2010	Nautica Malibu	California	Collapsed from a stroke shortly after race	Later
UK	Ian Sloss	64	8/8/2010	London	London	Collapsed during swim and died two days later	Swim
US	Leslie Chariton	60	7/31/2010	Hayden View	Idaho	Cardiac Arrest	Swim
US	Derek Valentino	40	6/27/2010	Philadelphia Insurance	Pennsylvania	Drowning, body was found next day; significant legal case	Swim
US	Nicole Baird Buchholz	24	6/20/2010	Jacksonville Sprint Series	Florida	Crashed on bike due to ongoing medical issue	Bike
US	Bernadette Collins	40	6/19/2010	Eglin's My First Tri	Florida	Collapsed on run	Run
UK	Christopher Moran	54	5/1/2010	RAF Brize Norton	Oxon	Suffered heart failure	Run
Canada	Lor Porciuncula Jarin	51	9/26/2009	Mount Shasta Tinman	Siskiyou	Anoxia	Swim
US	Mary Ehrlinger	38	9/16/2009	Ironman 140.6 Wisconsin	Wisconsin	Unnatural Death	Swim
Canada	Walter Eugene Wiwchar	66	8/30/2009	Ironman 140.6 Canada	Penticton	Trouble during the latter half of the swim portion	Swim
Philippines	Juan Miguel Vazquez	51	8/22/2009	Ironman 70.3 Philippines	Cebu	Stroke	Swim
US	Kim Schmidt	43	8/9/2009	Elkhart Lake	Wisconsin	Drowning	Swim
US	John Carr	47	8/1/2009	E.P. Tom Sawyer Triathlon	Kentucky	Hit by a drunk driver	Bike
Singapore	Calvin Lee Wee Sing	42	8/1/2009	OSIM Singapore	Singapore	Unnatural death	Swim
US	Daniel Murray	33	7/11/2009	The Pewaukee	Wisconsin	Drowning	Swim
US	Julie Silletti	54	6/13/2009	Elkhart Lake	Wisconsin	Drowning	Swim
US	Phillip Coulston	63	8/24/2008	Escape From The Rock	California	Cardiac arrest	Swim
US	Barbara Warren	65	8/23/2008	Santa Barbara	California	Broke her neck in a fall, paralyzed from the neck down, breathing with the help of a ventilator and signaled that she wanted the ventilator turned off	Bike
US	John Hobgood	52	7/27/2008	New Jersey State	New Jersey	Drowning, body was found next day	Swim
US	Donald Morehouse	60	7/26/2008	Spudman	Idaho	Drowning	Swim
US	Esteban Neira	32	7/20/2008	New York City	New York	Hypertensive heart disease	Swim
US	Patrick Findlay	45	6/29/2008	Pacific Crest	Oregon	Heart attack	Swim
US	Jim Goodman	46	6/22/2008	Hy-Vee	Iowa	Drowning	Swim
US	Patrick Kane	38	5/10/2008	Florida Panhandle .	Georgia	Drowning	Swim
US	Randolph Parnell	51	5/3/2008	CB&I	Texas	Drowning, but had heart issues	Swim
US	Dorothy Barnett-Griffin	43	10/6/2007	Ironman 140.6 Florida	Florida	Collapsed just after finishing swim	Swim
US	Daniel Eimermann	55	9/15/2007	Devil's Challenge	Wisconsin	Had pre-existing condition	Swim
US	Sara Lowes	51	8/6/2007	Alcatraz Challenge Aquathon	California	Drowning	Swim
US	Joseph J. Lyons Jr	38	7/8/2007	Cohasset	Massachusetts	Drowning	Swim
US	Kevin Hunt	28	6/23/2007	Ultra Max	Missouri	Drowning	Swim
Singapore	Thaddeus Cheong	17	6/23/2007	Singapore Bay Run	Singapore	Southeast Asia Games; Foamed at mouth after completing race	Later
US	Juli Wilson Marshall	48	4/29/2007	St. Anthony's	Florida	Broken nose in swim. 4,000 participants.	Swim
US	Barney Rice	35	11/4/2006	Ironman 140.6 Florida	Florida	Drowning	Swim
UK	Paul Simpson	31	8/5/2006	London	London	Cardiac arrest	Swim
US	Chris Eborn	33	5/13/2006	St. George	Utah	Cardiac arrest	Swim
Singapore	Ho Wai Piew	40	10/22/2005	New Balance Corporate	Singapore	Cardiac arrest	Swim
US	Artem Boris Groisman	37	9/25/2005	Mountain Man	Nevada	Seizure	Swim
US	Howard Garcia	76	7/24/2005	Boulder Peak	Colorado	Drowning	Swim
US	Patrick Bell	23	6/19/2005	Ashland Lions MetroWest	Massachusetts	Heart attack shortly after finishing	Later
Australia	Peter Semos	37	11/7/2004	Noosa	Noosa	Collapsed on run	Run
US	Mike Vieth	58	8/3/2003	Troika	Washington	Drowning	Swim
US	Wayne Scrimshaw	48	5/26/2003	Keauhou-Kona	Hawaii	Hit by a car	Bike
US	Jon Druhot	36	7/21/2002	Timberman	Minnesota	Cold water drowning	Swim
US	John Boland	53	6/8/2002	Ironman 140.6 Utah	Utah	Swim cancelled mid event, Drowning	Swim
US	Jeffrey Helfer	37	7/14/2001	Camp Pendleton International	California	Drowning	Swim
US	Perry Rendina	45	5/20/2001	Ironman 140.6 California	California	Slammed into a guard rail at the bottom of a hill	Bike
US	John Mawdslwy	39	8/27/1995	Mrs. T's	Illinois	Drowning	Swim
US	Mike Lanham	42	8/21/1994	Mrs. T's	Illinois	Cardiac arrest	Swim
US	James O'Rourke	35	4/21/1991	Spring Muscle Stretcher	Nebraska	Sudden cardiac arrest caused by a genetic condition	Run
US	Curtis Silvey	17	8/21/1988	Reston	Virginia	Drowning, water temperatures as low as 40 degrees	Swim
US	Casey Marie Stevenson	15	7/26/1987	San Luis Obispo Recreational	California	Struck by vehicle while crossing a highway	Bike
Japan	Yonezo Kasahara	39	7/12/1987	Miyakojima	Hirara	Drowning	Swim
US	Steven McAdams	30	6/28/1987	Governor's Cup	Colorado	Struck by vehicle	Bike
US	C. Frederick Kelley	61	6/28/1987	Farmington	Connecticut	Cardiac arrest	Swim
US	Seymour Leebowitz	50	6/14/1987	Craigville Beach	Massachusetts	Heart attack	Bike
US	Paul Childs	20	9/7/1986	Baptist Memorial Hospital	Missouri	Hit by car	Bike
US	David Daniels	25	8/10/1986	Muskegon	Michigan	Drowning	Swim
