= Jason Carty =

British masters sprint athlete (died 2021)

- Born: 10 November 1969
- Died: September 2021 (aged 51)
- Occupation: Masters Sprint Athlete

Jason Carty (10 November 1969 - September 2021) was a British masters sprint athlete and world record holder.

== Masters Athletics Career ==
At the European Masters Indoor Championships in March 2015, Carty won the gold medal in the 60 m in the M45 category in a time of 7.24. Later in the year, after a successful British Masters Championships, Carty came second in the 100 m at the World Masters Championships to Reggie Pendland of the US, just ahead of his British rival Darren Scott.

In 2016, Carty was diagnosed with lung cancer. But he returned to competitive athletics and at the World Masters Athletics Championships in 2018 he took gold in the M45 100 m in a new British record, and also won the 4 × 100 m relay.
