= Jakob Jutz =

Swiss long-distance runner

Personal information
- Nationality: Swiss
- Born: 1915
- Died: 26 August 1951 (aged 35–36) Switzerland

Sport
- Sport: Long-distance running
- Event: Marathon

Jakob Jutz (1915 – 26 August 1951) was a Swiss long-distance runner. He competed in the marathon at the 1948 Summer Olympics, finishing in 29th place.

Jutz died due to heart failure while running the 1951 Swiss Athletics Federation marathon championships.
